= The Haunted Mine =

1946 film directed by Derwin Abrahams

- Directed by: Derwin Abrahams
- Screenplay by: Frank H. Young
- Story by: Betty Burbridge
- Produced by: Scott R. Dunlap
- Starring: Johnny Mack Brown; Raymond Hatton; Linda Leighton; Riley Hill; John Merton; Ray Bennett
- Cinematography: Harry Neumann
- Edited by: Fred Maguire
- Production company: Monogram Pictures
- Distributed by: Monogram Pictures
- Release date: March 2, 1946
- Running time: 51 minutes
- Country: United States
- Language: English

The Haunted Mine is a 1946 American Western film directed by Derwin Abrahams and written by Frank H. Young. This is the twentieth and final film in the "Marshal Nevada Jack McKenzie" series, and stars Johnny Mack Brown as Jack McKenzie and Raymond Hatton as his sidekick Sandy Hopkins, with Linda Leighton, Riley Hill, John Merton and Ray Bennett. The film was released on March 2, 1946, by Monogram Pictures.

== Cast ==
- Johnny Mack Brown as Nevada Jack McKenzie
- Raymond Hatton as Sandy Hopkins
- Linda Leighton as Jenny Durant
- Riley Hill as Dan McLeod
- John Merton as Steve Twining
- Ray Bennett as The Old Hermit
- Claire Whitney as Mrs. Durant
- Marshall Reed as Blackie
- Robert Bentley as Tracy
- Terry Frost as Bill Meade
- Lynton Brent as Skyball
- Leonard St. Leo as Stirrup
- Frank LaRue as Matterson
