= Under Arizona Skies =

1946 film directed by Lambert Hillyer

- Theatrical release poster
- Directed by: Lambert Hillyer
- Screenplay by: J. Benton Cheney
- Story by: John P. McCarthy
- Produced by: Scott R. Dunlap
- Starring: Johnny Mack Brown; Reno Browne; Raymond Hatton; Riley Hill; Tris Coffin; Reed Howes
- Cinematography: Harry Neumann
- Edited by: Fred Maguire
- Production company: Monogram Pictures
- Distributed by: Monogram Pictures
- Release date: May 27, 1946
- Running time: 59 minutes
- Country: United States
- Language: English

Under Arizona Skies is a 1946 American Western film directed by Lambert Hillyer and written by J. Benton Cheney. The film stars Johnny Mack Brown, Reno Browne, Raymond Hatton, Riley Hill, Tris Coffin and Reed Howes. The film was released on May 27, 1946, by Monogram Pictures.

== Cast ==
- Johnny Mack Brown as Dusty Smith
- Reno Browne as Cindy Rigby
- Raymond Hatton as Santa Fe Jones
- Riley Hill as Bill Simpson
- Tris Coffin as Blackie Evans
- Reed Howes as Duke
- Ted Adams as John Carter
- Ray Bennett as Tom Sloan
- Frank LaRue as Jim Simpson
- Steve Clark as Sam Stewart
- Jack Rockwell as Sheriff John Rigby
- Bud Geary as Chuck Gilmore
- Ted Mapes as Red Connors
- Dusty Rhodes as Slim
- Kermit Maynard as Joe Forbes
- Smith Ballew as Band Singer
