= Silver Range =

1946 film

- Theatrical release poster
- Directed by: Lambert Hillyer
- Screenplay by: J. Benton Cheney
- Produced by: Scott R. Dunlap
- Starring: Johnny Mack Brown; Raymond Hatton; Jan Bryant; I. Stanford Jolley; Terry Frost; Eddie Parker
- Cinematography: Harry Neumann
- Edited by: Fred Maguire
- Production company: Monogram Pictures
- Distributed by: Monogram Pictures
- Release date: November 16, 1946
- Running time: 53 minutes
- Country: United States
- Language: English

Silver Range is a 1946 American Western film directed by Lambert Hillyer and written by J. Benton Cheney. The film stars Johnny Mack Brown, Raymond Hatton, Jan Bryant, I. Stanford Jolley, Terry Frost and Eddie Parker. The film was released on November 16, 1946, by Monogram Pictures.

== Cast ==
- Johnny Mack Brown as Johnny Bronton
- Raymond Hatton as Tucson Smith
- Jan Bryant as Jeanne Willoughby
- I. Stanford Jolley as Sheriff Bill Armstrong
- Terry Frost as Red Cameron
- Eddie Parker as Bart Nelson
- Ted Adams as Jason Turner
- Frank LaRue as Steve Ferguson
- Cactus Mack as Larry
- Lane Bradford as Browning
- Dee Cooper as Faro
- Billy Dix as Chuck
- Bill Willmering as Jim Willoughby
