= Myron Healey =

American actor (1923–2005)

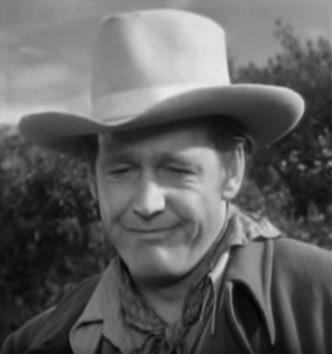
- Healey in the TV series Stories of the Century, episode "The Dalton Gang"
- Born: Myron Daniel Healey; June 8, 1923; Petaluma, California, U.S.
- Died: December 21, 2005 (aged 82); Simi Valley, California, U.S.
- Occupation: Actor
- Years active: 1943–1994
- Spouses: Dorothy Ann Pemberton (m. 1943; div. 1948) Leslie Wright Hall (m. 1961, divorced) Elizabeth Mary D'Errico (m. 1963; div. 1968) Adair Jameson (m. 1971; div. 1972)
- Children: 2

Myron Daniel Healey (June 8, 1923 – December 21, 2005) was an American actor. He began his career in Hollywood, California during the early 1940s and eventually made hundreds of appearances in movies and on television during a career spanning more than half a century.

== Early years ==
Healey was born in Petaluma in Sonoma County, California, the son of Dr. and Mrs. Robert D. Healey. He served in World War II as an Air Corps navigator and bombardier, flying in Martin B-26 Marauders in the European Theatre. After the war he continued military duties, retiring in the early 1960s as a captain in the United States Air Force Reserve.

== Acting career ==
Healey's film debut came in 1943 with Young Ideas. Returning to film work after World War II, he played villains and henchmen in low-budget Western films. He also did some screenwriting. In the post-war period he was frequently seen in Westerns from Monogram Pictures, often starring Johnny Mack Brown, Jimmy Wakely and Whip Wilson.

In the 1950s Healey moved to more "bad guy" roles in other films, including the Bomba and Jungle Jim series, crime dramas and more westerns. He portrayed the bandit Bob Dalton in an episode of the syndicated television series Stories of the Century, starring and narrated by Jim Davis. In 1955 he played a "good guy" for a change as Phyllis Coates' partner in the 1955 Republic Pictures serial Panther Girl of the Kongo.

Earlier in 1952, Healey was cast in one of the first episodes of the syndicated television anthology series Death Valley Days, hosted by the "Old Ranger" (Stanley Andrews).

Healey appeared seven times as Captain Bandcroft in The Adventures of Kit Carson (1951–55). He was cast twice in 1957–58 as Becker in two episodes of the ABC/Warner Brothers western series Colt .45 starring Wayde Preston, seven times (1950–57) in the long-running The Lone Ranger, and ten times (1952–55) in The Roy Rogers Show television series.

Healey played the outlaw Johnny Ringo in the western television series Tombstone Territory, with Pat Conway as Sheriff Clay Hollister, in the episode "Johnny Ringo's Last Ride" with a teleplay by Sam Peckinpah. He appeared in an episode of the children's western series Buckskin, which aired on NBC from 1958 to 1959. He was a semi-regular on programs produced by Gene Autry's Flying A production company: Annie Oakley, Buffalo Bill, Jr., The Range Rider, and The Gene Autry Show. He also guest-starred on the crime drama with a modern Western setting, The Sheriff of Cochise, starring John Bromfield, and in the Western set in the 1840s, Riverboat, starring Darren McGavin. He also appeared in an episode of the second season of Zorro.

Between 1960 and 1963, Healey appeared five times on the NBC western Laramie, starring John Smith and Robert Fuller. He appeared ten times on another NBC western, The Virginian, and four times on Laredo. He also made appearances on Gunsmoke.

From 1959 to 1961, he played Major Peter Horry, top aide to Leslie Nielsen, in the miniseries Swamp Fox on Walt Disney Presents, based on the American Revolutionary War hero Francis Marion.

In 1970 Healey appeared as Wardlow in the TV western "The Men From Shiloh" (the rebranded name of The Virginian) in the episode titled "Jenny".

The television role for which Healey may be best remembered is that of "Doc Holliday" in The Life and Legend of Wyatt Earp TV series which starred Hugh O'Brian. He played that role for one season when Douglas Fowley, the regular Doc Holliday on the series, was away on a movie job.

Collectively, Healey appeared in some 140 films, including 81 westerns and three serials. Among his non-western pictures, he appeared in at least three horror films: the Americanized version of the Japanese giant-monster movie Varan the Unbelievable (1958), The Unearthly with John Carradine (1957) and The Incredible Melting Man (1977).

== Death ==
In 2005, Healey broke his hip in a fall and never recovered. He died at the age of 82 at a hospital near his home in Simi Valley, California.

== Recognition ==
In 2000, Healey received a Golden Boot Award for his contributions to Western films and television programs.

== Selected filmography ==
Feature films include

- Young Ideas (1943) - Student (uncredited)
- Salute to the Marines (1943) - Gunner (uncredited)
- Swing Shift Maisie (1943) - Young Pilot (uncredited)
- Thousands Cheer (1943) - Soldier at Train Station with Polish Girl (uncredited)
- I Dood It (1943) - Page Boy (uncredited)
- The Iron Major (1943) - Paul Cavanaugh (uncredited)
- See Here, Private Hargrove (1944) - Lieutenant (uncredited)
- Meet the People (1944) - Marine (uncredited)
- The Time of Their Lives (1946) - Dandy at Party (uncredited)
- Crime Doctor's Man Hunt (1946) - Philip Armstrong / John Foster (uncredited)
- That Brennan Girl (1946) - Party Guest (uncredited)
- Blondie's Big Moment (1947) - Pipe-Smoking Office Worker (uncredited)
- Millie's Daughter (1947) - Attendant (uncredited)
- Buck Privates Come Home (1947) - Tech Sergeant, Medic #5 (uncredited)
- The Corpse Came C.O.D. (1947) - Reporter (uncredited), Pilot (uncredited)
- It Had to Be You (1947) - Gardner Huntington Standish (uncredited)
- Tall, Dark and Gruesome (1948, Short) - Partygoer in devil's costume
- I, Jane Doe (1948) - Intern (uncredited)
- Blondie's Reward (1948) - Cluett Day
- Walk a Crooked Mile (1948) - FBI Agent Thompson (uncredited)
- The Return of October (1948) - Assistant Lawyer (uncredited)
- You Gotta Stay Happy (1948) - Day Clerk (uncredited)
- Hidden Danger (1948) - James Carson
- Wake of the Red Witch (1948) - 'Red Witch' Seaman (uncredited)
- Ladies of the Chorus (1948) - Randy's Cousin (uncredited)
- The Man from Colorado (1949) - Powers (uncredited)
- Slightly French (1949) - Stevens (uncredited)
- Knock on Any Door (1949) - Assistant District Attorney (uncredited)
- Gun Law Justice (1949) - Jensen
- Trails End (1949) - Drake
- Across the Rio Grande (1949) - Stage Holdup Man
- Laramie (1949) - Lieutenant Reed (uncredited)
- Batman and Robin (1949, Serial) - Walker, Policeman [Ch. 7] (uncredited)
- Air Hostess (1949) - Ralph
- Brand of Fear (1949) - Jeffers
- The Wyoming Bandit (1949) - Tom Howard (uncredited)
- Range Justice (1949) - Murdered Henchman
- South of Rio (1949) - Marshal Travis
- Mr. Soft Touch (1949) - Doctor (uncredited)
- Haunted Trails (1949) - Henchman Lassiter
- Western Renegades (1949) - Henchman Gus
- Rusty's Birthday (1949) - Jack Wiggins (uncredited)
- Riders of the Dusk (1949) - Sheriff Jim
- Pioneer Marshal (1949) - Larry Devlin
- Lawless Code (1949) - Donald Martin
- Fence Riders (1950) - Cameo Krogan
- Trail of the Rustlers (1950) - Ben Mahoney (uncredited)
- West of Wyoming (1950) - Brodie
- Over the Border (1950) - Jeff Grant
- A Woman of Distinction (1950) - Cameraman (uncredited)
- Kill the Umpire (1950) - Train Conductor Operator (uncredited)
- No Sad Songs for Me (1950) - Chris's Young Man (uncredited)
- Salt Lake Raiders (1950) - Fred Mason
- In a Lonely Place (1950) - Post Office Clerk (uncredited)
- Timber Fury (1950) - Paxton Man (uncredited)
- Federal Man (1950) - The Tracking Device Specialist (uncredited)
- Hi-Jacked (1950) - Police Broadcaster
- I Killed Geronimo (1950) - Henchman Frank Corcoran
- The Fuller Brush Girl (1950) - Employee (uncredited)
- My Blue Heaven (1950) - Adoptive Father (uncredited)
- Law of the Panhandle (1950) - Henry Faulkner
- Between Midnight and Dawn (1950) - Officer Davis (uncredited)
- Hot Rod (1950) - Joe Langham, Policeman
- Emergency Wedding (1950) - Guest (uncredited)
- Experiment Alcatraz (1950) - Wire Service Reporter (uncredited)
- Outlaw Gold (1950) - Sonny Lang
- Short Grass (1950) - Les McCambridge
- Colorado Ambush (1951) - Chet Murdock
- Al Jennings of Oklahoma (1951) - Confederate Corporal (uncredited)
- Baby Sitters Jitters (1951, Short) - George Lloyd
- Night Riders of Montana (1951) - Steve Bauer
- I Was an American Spy (1951) - American Soldier in Jeep (uncredited)
- Roar of the Iron Horse (1951, Serial) - Ace, Henchman [Chs.3,4,6,9,10,15]
- Lorna Doone (1951) - Todd Darcy (uncredited)
- The Texas Rangers (1951) - Texas Ranger Captain Peak (uncredited)
- Montana Desperado (1951) - Ron Logan
- Bonanza Town (1951) - Krag Boseman
- Journey Into Light (1951) - Jerry, the Cop
- Slaughter Trail (1951) - Heath (uncredited)
- Drums in the Deep South (1951) - Union Lieutenant (uncredited)
- Elephant Stampede (1951) - Joe Collins
- The Longhorn (1951) - Andy
- The Wild Blue Yonder (1951) - Man on Tower (voice, uncredited)
- Silver City (1951) - Bleek (uncredited)
- The Big Night (1951) - Kennealy
- Fort Osage (1952) - Martin Christensen
- Rodeo (1952) - Richard Durston
- Montana Territory (1952) - Bill Landers
- Storm Over Tibet (1952) - Bill March
- The Kid from Broken Gun (1952) - Kiefer
- Fargo (1952) - Red Olsen
- Apache War Smoke (1952) - Pike Curtis
- Desperadoes' Outpost (1952) - Lieutenant Dan Booker
- Monsoon (1952) - Rault
- The Maverick (1952) - Sergeant Frick
- The Studebaker Story (1953) as Peter Studebaker
- Kansas Pacific (1953) - Morey
- White Lightning (1953) - Nelson
- Son of Belle Starr (1953) - Sheriff Hansen
- The Moonlighter (1953) - Deputy Joe Bayliss (uncredited)
- Saginaw Trail (1953) - Miller Webb
- Fighting Lawman (1953) - Sheriff Dave Wilson
- Combat Squad (1953) - Marley
- Hot News (1953) - Jim O'Hara
- Vigilante Terror (1953) - Brett
- Private Eyes (1953) - Carl, Rose Hill Attendant
- Texas Bad Man (1953) - Jackson
- Rails Into Laramie (1954) - Con Winton
- Silver Lode (1954) - Rider (uncredited)
- They Rode West (1954) - Major 'Van' Vandergrift (uncredited)
- Cattle Queen of Montana (1954) - Hank
- Gang Busters (1955) - as John Omar Pinson (FBI's 4th most wanted fugitive)
- Panther Girl of the Kongo (1955) - Larry Sanders
- African Manhunt (1955) - Captain Bob Kirby
- Man Without a Star (1955) - Mogollon (uncredited)
- Rage at Dawn (1955) - John Reno
- The Man from Bitter Ridge (1955) - Clem Jackman
- Ma and Pa Kettle at Waikiki (1955) - Marty, Kidnapper (uncredited)
- Jungle Moon Men (1955) - Mark Santo
- Tennessee's Partner (1955) - Reynolds
- Count Three and Pray (1955) - Floyd Miller
- Dig That Uranium (1955) - Joe Hody
- Slightly Scarlet (1956) - Wison, Caspar Thug (uncredited)
- The First Texan (1956) - Captain Martin (uncredited)
- Magnificent Roughnecks (1956) - Werner Jackson
- The Young Guns (1956) - Deputy Nix
- Calling Homicide (1956) - Jim Haddix
- The White Squaw (1956) - Eric Swanson
- Running Target (1956) - Kaygo
- Guns Don't Argue (1957) - as John Dillinger
- Hell's Crossroads (1957) - Cole Younger
- Shoot-Out at Medicine Bend (1957) - Rafe Sanders
- Lure of the Swamp (1957) - Bank Guard
- The Restless Breed (1957) - Sheriff Mike Williams
- The Unearthly (1957) - Undercover Police Officer Mark Houston
- Undersea Girl (1957) - Eric 'Swede' Nelson, Gang Member
- The Hard Man (1957) - Ray Hendry (uncredited)
- Escape from Red Rock (1957) - Joe Skinner
- Cavalry Command AKA Day of the Trumpet (1958) - Lieutenant Worth
- Cole Younger, Gunfighter (1958) - Phil Bennett / Charlie Bennett
- Quantrill's Raiders (1958) - Jarrett
- Apache Territory (1958) - Webb
- Onionhead (1958) - Leggas (uncredited)
- Rio Bravo (1959) - Barfly (uncredited)
- Ma Barker's Killer Brood (1960) - Sioux Falls Bank Robber (uncredited)
- The George Raft Story (1961) - Joel Creelman (uncredited)
- Convicts 4 (1962) - Gunther
- Varan the Unbelievable (1962) - Commander James Bradley
- He Rides Tall (1964) - Marshal Ed Loomis (uncredited)
- Mirage (1965) - Bar Patron Discussing Watermelon (voice, uncredited)
- Harlow (1965) - Rex Chambers (uncredited)
- The Swinger (1966) - Reporter (uncredited)
- Gunfight in Abilene (1967) - Ingles (uncredited)
- Journey to Shiloh (1968) - Sheriff Briggs
- The Shakiest Gun in the West (1968) - Stage Passenger (uncredited)
- True Grit (1969) - Deputy at prisoner unloading (uncredited)
- The Computer Wore Tennis Shoes (1969) - Police Detective (uncredited)
- The Cheyenne Social Club (1970) - Deuter
- Which Way to the Front? (1970) - Army Major Doctor (uncredited)
- Smoke in the Wind (1975) - Mort Fagan
- The Incredible Melting Man (1977) - General Michael Perry
- Claws (1977) - Sheriff
- The Other Side of the Mountain Part 2 (1978) - Doctor in Bishop
- Goodbye, Franklin High (1978) - Walter Craig
- Forever and Beyond (1983) - Nicholas
- Ghost Fever (1986) - Andrew Lee
- Pulse (1988) - Howard
- Little Giants (1994) - Doctor (final film role)

Other western appearances include

- The Cisco Kid (1951–1954)
  - (S2:E3, "Postal Inspector") (1951) as Drake, Henchman
  - (S2:E9, "Kid Sister Trouble") (1951) as Sloan
  - (S3:E17, "The Devil's Deputy") (1953) as E.B. Johnson
  - (S5:E2, "The Haunted Stage Stop") (1954) as Don White
  - (S5:E9, "Pot of Gold") (1954) as Jim Gault
- The Adventures of Rin-Tin-Tin (1955–1956)
  - (Season 1 Episode 18: "Babe in the Woods") (1955) as Jesse Harkness
  - (Season 2 Episode 2: "Rin Tin Tin Meets Shakespeare") (1955) as Odds-On O'Connor
  - (Season 2 Episode 29: "Rin Tin Tin and the Rainmaker") (1956) as Morrel
- Cheyenne (1955–1961)
  - (S1:E4, "Border Showdown") (1955) as Carl Thompson
  - (S2:E1, "The Dark Rider") (1956) as Lew Lattimer
  - (S3:E5, "Devil's Canyon") (1957) as Chip Claney
  - (S5:E8, "The Return of Mr. Grimm") (1961) as Wesley Mason
  - (S5:E10, "The Frightened Town") (1961) as Tully
- The Sheriff of Cochise (1956) (Season 1 Episode 10: "The Red-Haired Visitor") as Dillon
- Judge Roy Bean (1956)
  - (Season 1 Episode 17: "Checkmate") as Bert Reno
  - (S1:E19, "The Eyes of Texas") as Jake Winters
  - (Season 1 Episode 23: "The Katcina Doll") as Hurley
  - (Season 1 Episode 26: "The Travelers") as John Gorman
- Tombstone Territory
  - (Season 1 Episode 19: "Johnny Ringo's Last Ride" as Johnny Ringo (1958)
- State Trooper (1957–1959)
  - (S1:E24, "The Last War Party") (1957) as Red Shawn
  - (S2:E18, "Crisis at Comstock") (1958) as Ed Benson
  - (S2:E44, "Excitement at Milltown") (1959) as Big Nels
- Maverick (1958–1961)
  - (S1:E27, "Seed of Deception") (1958) as Jim Mundy
  - (S3:E12, "Trooper Maverick") (1959) as Jed Benedict
  - (S5:E3, "The Golden Fleecing") (1961) as Frank Mercer
- Wagon Train (1958–1964)
  - (S1:E35, "The Rex Montana Story") (1958) as Bill Miller
  - (Season 2 Episode 29: "The Clara Duncan Story") (1959) as Steve Wilson
  - (S5:E11, "The Traitor") (1961) as Sergeant Oakes
  - (S5:E29, "The Levi Hale Story") (1962) as Deputy Sheriff
  - (S6:E31, "The Tom O'Neal Story") (1963) as Mr. O'Neal
  - (S7:E1, "The Molly Kincaid Story") (1963) as Doc Curley
  - (Season 7 Episode 21: "The Andrew Elliott Story") (1964) as Sergeant Bob Rollins
  - (S7:E32, "The Last Circle Up") (1964) as Wayne Rossen (uncredited)
- Cimarron City (1959) (Season 1 Episode 17: "Runaway Train") as Clayton Buckley
- Bat Masterson (1959)
  - (S1:E28, "Lottery of Death") as Jack Latigo
  - (S2:E1, "To the Manner Born") as Colonel Marc James
- The Texan (1959–1960)
  - (S1:E32, "Badlands") (1959) as Sheriff Ed Courtney
  - (S2:E27, "The Governor's Lady") (1960) as Clay Calder
  - (S2:E37, "Johnny Tuvo") (1960) as Gait Gaylor
- Rawhide (1959–1962)
  - (Season 1 Episode 2: "Incident at Alabaster Plain") (1959) as Gun Guard (uncredited)
  - (Season 1 Episode 15: "Incident of the Calico Gun") (1959) as Jeb
  - (Season 3 Episode 14: "Incident of the Big Blowout") (1961) as Lou Calvert
  - (Season 5 Episode 6: "Incident of the Four Horseman") (1962) as Willie
- Zane Grey Theatre (1960)
  - (S2:E29, "Utopia, Wyoming") as Cliff Merson
  - (Season 4 Episode 27: "Seed of Evil") as Sam Brady
- The Alaskans (1960) (Season 1 Episode 28: "Odd Man Hangs") as Fred Simmons
- Laramie (American TV series)
  - (Season 2 Episode 3: "Three Rode West") (1960) as Frank Skinner
  - (Season 3 Episode 10: "Handful of Fire") (1961) as Army Lieutenant Paul Harmon
  - (S3:E22, "The Dynamiters") (1962) as Dan Garnes
  - (S4:E9, "Beyond Justice") (1962) as Ben Chantler
  - (S4:E23, "The Unvanquished") (1963) as Rafe
- The Rebel (1961) (S2:E26, "The Pit") as Mac McGowan
- Whispering Smith (1961) (Season 1 Episode 14: "Double Edge") as Jim Conley
- Gunsmoke (1962)
  - (S7:E29, "The Summons") as Jake Moseley
  - (S8:E3, "Quint Asper Comes Home") as Mike
- Have Gun – Will Travel (1963) (Season 6 Episode 17: "Brotherhood") as Stennis
- The Dakotas (1963) (Season 1 Episode 18: "Sanctuary at Crystal Springs") as Sheriff
- The Virginian (1963–1970)
  - (S1:E30, "The Final Hour") (1963) as Martin Croft
  - (S2:E13, "Siege") (1963) as Yance Cooper
  - (Season 3 Episode 22: "You Take the High Road") (1965) as Jack Slauson
  - (S4:E1, "The Brothers") (1965) as Sergeant Cohane
  - (Season 4 Episode 23: "Ride a Cock-Horse to Laramie Cross") (1966) as Lomax
  - (S5:E14, "Girl on the Glass Mountain") (1966) as Blue
  - (S6:E9, "A Bad Place to Die") (1967) as Potts
  - (S7:E14, "Stopover") (1969) as Second Drifter
  - (S8:E9, "The Bugler") (1969) as Lieutenant Mike Buehl
  - (S9:E3, "Jenny") (1970) as Wardlow
- Bonanza (1964–1968)
  - (S6:E14, "The Saga of Squaw Charlie") (1964) as Buck
  - (S8:E31, "The Wormwood Cup") (1967) as Sam
  - (S9:E17, "The Thirteenth Man") (1968) as Johannsen
  - (S9:E19, "The Price of Salt") (1968) as Zeb Williams
- Daniel Boone (1965–1969)
  - (S2:E12, "The First Beau") (1965) as Mike Kravic
  - (S3:E6, "Run a Crooked Mile") (1966) as Lynch
  - (S5:E24, "For a Few Rifles") (1969) as James Burns
- The Road West (1967) (S1:E20, "The Insider") as Big Foot
- The Guns of Will Sonnett (1967–1969)
  - (S1:E4, "The Natural Way") (1967) as Lank Turner
  - (S2:E7, "A Difference of Opinion") (1968) as Sheriff Flagg
  - (S2:E24, "Three Stand Together") (1969) as Jack Curson
- Kung Fu (1973)
  - (Season 1 Episode 4: "An Eye for an Eye") as Opening Scene Trooper with bottle shot off his head (uncredited)
  - (Season 2 Episode 8: "The Soldier) as Captain Malachy

Non-western appearances include

- Adventures of Superman (1955-1956)
  - (Season 3 Episode 10: "The Bully of Dry Gulch") (1955) as Gunner Flinch
  - (Season 4 Episode 9: "Dagger Island") (1956) as Paul Craymore
  - (Season 4 Episode 13: "The Jolly Roger") (1956) as Captain Mud
- Behind Closed Doors (1958) (Season 1 Episode 9: "The Enemy on the Flank") as Lister
- Sea Hunt (1958–1960)
  - (Season 1 Episode 34: "Killer Rock") (1958) as Russ Hodges
  - (Season 3 Episode 12: "The Fearmakers") (1960) as US Coast Guard Commander Jack Carter
- The Silent Service
  - (Season 1 Episode 1: "USS Jack at Tokyo") (1957) as Captain Thomas Dykers
- Perry Mason (1959) (Season 2 Episode 25: "The Case of the Petulant Partner") as Howard Roper
- Tightrope! (1960) (Season 1 Episode 31: "The Penthouse Story") as Al Cummings
- Bourbon Street Beat (1960) (Season 1 Episode 24: "Neon Nightmare") as Sheriff Clay Tarbo
- Alfred Hitchcock Presents (1961) (Season 6 Episode 32: "Incident in a Small Jail") as Carly, the Deputy
- Dante (1961) (Season 1 Episode 16: "Dante Rides Again") as Johnny Poco
- The Islanders (1961) (Season 1 Episode 20: "Island Witness") as Hightower
- The Alfred Hitchcock Hour (1962) (Season 1 Episode 12: "Hangover") as Bob Blake
- The Alfred Hitchcock Hour (1963) (Season 1 Episode 26: "An Out for Oscar") as Peter Rogan
- The Alfred Hitchcock Hour (1964) (Season 2 Episode 27: "The Sign of Satan") as Dave Connor
- The Alfred Hitchcock Hour (1965) (Season 3 Episode 23: "Completely Foolproof") as George Foyle
- Adam-12
  - (Season 2 Episode 10: "Log 143: Cave") (1969) as Jay Finlay
  - (Season 2 Episode 18: "Log 124: Airport") (1970) as Walt Cook
  - (Season 3 Episode 3: "Log 95: Purse Snatcher") (1970) as Carl Tremain
  - (Season 4 Episode 14: "Citizens All") (1972) as Warren Jarvey
  - (Season 5 Episode 13: "O'Brien's Stand") (1973) as Nelson
  - (Season 6 Episode 7: "Van Nuys Division: "Pete's Mustache") (1973) as Donald Whorton
- Spider-Man: The Dragon's Challenge (1981) - Lieutenant Olson
