= Six Gun Mesa =

1950 film

- Theatrical release poster
- Directed by: Wallace Fox
- Screenplay by: Adele Buffington
- Produced by: Wallace Fox
- Starring: Johnny Mack Brown; Gail Davis; Riley Hill; Leonard Penn; Marshall Reed; Milburn Morante
- Cinematography: Harry Neumann
- Edited by: John C. Fuller
- Production company: Monogram Pictures
- Distributed by: Monogram Pictures
- Release date: April 30, 1950
- Running time: 56 minutes
- Country: United States
- Language: English

Six Gun Mesa is a 1950 American Western film directed by Wallace Fox and written by Adele Buffington. The film stars Johnny Mack Brown, Gail Davis, Riley Hill, Leonard Penn, Marshall Reed and Milburn Morante. The film was released on April 30, 1950, by Monogram Pictures.

== Cast ==
- Johnny Mack Brown as Johnny Mack Brown
- Gail Davis as Lynne Gregory
- Riley Hill as Dave Emmett
- Leonard Penn as Carson
- Marshall Reed as Bull Bradley
- Milburn Morante as Whiskey Evans
- Carl Mathews as Joe Lang
- Bud Osborne as Marshal Hatch
- George DeNormand as Steve
- Stanley Blystone as Chip Mullins
- Steve Clark as Mark Jones
