= Law of the Panhandle =

1950 film by Lewis D. Collins

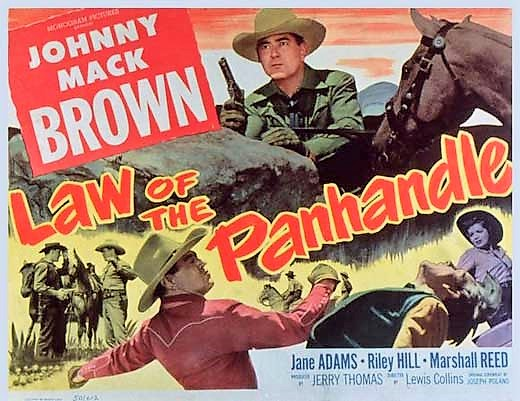
- Lobby card
- Directed by: Lewis D. Collins
- Written by: Joseph F. Poland
- Produced by: Jerry Thomas
- Starring: Johnny Mack Brown; Jane Adams; Riley Hill
- Cinematography: Harry Neumann
- Edited by: William Austin
- Music by: Edward J. Kay
- Production company: Monogram Pictures
- Distributed by: Monogram Pictures
- Release date: September 17, 1950
- Running time: 55 minutes
- Country: United States
- Language: English

Law of the Panhandle is a 1950 American Western film directed by Lewis D. Collins and starring Johnny Mack Brown, Jane Adams and Riley Hill.

== Cast ==
- Johnny Mack Brown as U.S. Marshal Johnny Mack Brown
- Jane Adams as Margie Kendal
- Riley Hill as Sheriff Tom
- Marshall Reed as Ed Rance
- Myron Healey as Henry Faulkner
- Ted Adams as Fred Kendal
- Lee Roberts as Henchman Judd
- Carol Henry as Henchman Ace
- Milburn Morante as Telegrapher Ezra
- Kermit Maynard as Luke Winslow
- Bob Duncan as Evans
