= Flashing Guns =

1947 film directed by Lambert Hilly

- Theatrical release poster
- Directed by: Lambert Hillyer
- Screenplay by: Frank H. Young
- Produced by: Barney Sarecky
- Starring: Johnny Mack Brown; Raymond Hatton; Riley Hill; Jan Bryant; Douglas Evans; James Logan
- Cinematography: Harry Neumann
- Edited by: Fred Maguire
- Production company: Monogram Pictures
- Distributed by: Monogram Pictures
- Release date: July 16, 1947
- Running time: 59 minutes
- Country: United States
- Language: English

Flashing Guns is a 1947 American Western film directed by Lambert Hillyer and written by Frank H. Young. The film stars Johnny Mack Brown, Raymond Hatton, Riley Hill, Jan Bryant, Douglas Evans and James Logan. The film was released on July 16, 1947, by Monogram Pictures.

== Cast ==
- Johnny Mack Brown as Johnny Mack
- Raymond Hatton as Amos Shelby
- Riley Hill as Fred Shelby
- Jan Bryant as Ann Shelby
- Douglas Evans as Longdon
- James Logan as Mark Ainsworth
- Jack O'Shea as Sagebrush
- Edmund Cobb as Sheriff Ed Newman
- Steve Clark as Cannon
- Norman Jolley as Mike Foley
- Frank LaRue as Judge
- Jack Rockwell as Cassidy
- Craig Duncan as Dishpan
- Ted Adams as Ripley
- Gary Garrett as Duke
- Ray Jones as Stirrup
