= Trailing Danger =

1947 film directed by Lambert Hillyer

- Theatrical release poster
- Directed by: Lambert Hillyer
- Screenplay by: J. Benton Cheney
- Produced by: Barney Sarecky
- Starring: Johnny Mack Brown; Raymond Hatton; Peggy Wynne; Marshall Reed; Patrick Desmond; Steve Darrell
- Cinematography: Harry Neumann
- Edited by: Roy Livingston
- Production company: Monogram Pictures
- Distributed by: Monogram Pictures
- Release date: March 29, 1947
- Running time: 58 minutes
- Country: United States
- Language: English

Trailing Danger is a 1947 American Western film directed by Lambert Hillyer and written by J. Benton Cheney. The film stars Johnny Mack Brown, Raymond Hatton, Peggy Wynne, Marshall Reed, Patrick Desmond and Steve Darrell. The film was released on March 29, 1947, by Monogram Pictures.

== Cast ==
- Johnny Mack Brown as Johnny
- Raymond Hatton as Waco
- Peggy Wynne as Kay Bannister
- Marshall Reed as Jim Holden
- Patrick Desmond as Hal Hathaway
- Steve Darrell as George Bannister
- Eddie Parker as Riley
- Bonnie Jean Hartley as Paradise Flo
- Ernie Adams as Pennypacker
- Bud Osborne as Mason
- Cactus Mack as Sam
- Kansas Moehring as Sheriff Clayton
- Gary Garrett as Bruce
