= Fence Riders =

1950 film by Wallace Fox

- Theatrical release poster
- Directed by: Wallace Fox
- Screenplay by: Eliot Gibbons
- Produced by: Wallace Fox
- Starring: Whip Wilson; Andy Clyde; Reno Browne; Riley Hill; Myron Healey; Ed Cassidy
- Cinematography: Harry Neumann
- Edited by: John C. Fuller
- Production company: Monogram Pictures
- Distributed by: Monogram Pictures
- Release date: January 19, 1950
- Running time: 57 minutes
- Country: United States
- Language: English

Fence Riders is a 1950 American Western film directed by Wallace Fox and written by Eliot Gibbons. The film stars Whip Wilson, Andy Clyde, Reno Browne, Riley Hill, Myron Healey and Ed Cassidy. It was released on January 19, 1950 by Monogram Pictures.

== Cast ==
- Whip Wilson as Whip Wilson
- Andy Clyde as Winks McGee
- Reno Browne as Jean Martin
- Riley Hill as Hutch Cramer
- Myron Healey as Cameo Krogan
- Ed Cassidy as Sheriff Tracy
- Terry Frost as Deputy
- Frank McCarroll as Pete
- George DeNormand as Joe
- Mike Ragan as Gus Rayburn
- John Merton as Slater
- Buck Bailey as Ted
