= Shadows of the West =

- Theatrical release poster
- Directed by: Ray Taylor
- Screenplay by: Adele Buffington
- Produced by: Barney Sarecky
- Starring: Whip Wilson; Andy Clyde; Riley Hill; Reno Browne; Bill Kennedy; Pierce Lyden
- Cinematography: Harry Neumann
- Edited by: John C. Fuller
- Production company: Monogram Pictures
- Distributed by: Monogram Pictures
- Release date: January 24, 1949
- Running time: 59 minutes
- Country: United States
- Language: English

Shadows of the West is a 1949 American Western film directed by Ray Taylor and written by Adele Buffington. The film stars Whip Wilson, Andy Clyde, Riley Hill, Reno Browne, Bill Kennedy and Pierce Lyden. The film was released on January 24, 1949, by Monogram Pictures.

== Plot ==
Shadows of the West is a 59 minutes running time American Western film (directed by Ray Taylor; written by Adele Buffinton) released in 1949 by Monogram Pictures.

== Cast ==
- Whip Wilson as Whip Wilson
- Andy Clyde as Winks Grayson
- Riley Hill as Carl Bud Davis
- Reno Browne as Virginia Grayson
- Bill Kennedy as B. Jonathan Ward
- Pierce Lyden as Jordan
- Kenne Duncan as Bill Mayberry
- Keith Richards as Steve
- William Ruhl as Sheriff Tanner
- Ted Adams as Paul Davis
- Lee Phelps as Hart
- Bret Hamilton as Clerk
- Bud Osborne as Jones
- Donald Kerr as Baker
