= The Rangers Ride =

1948 film directed by Derwin Abrahams

- Theatrical release poster
- Directed by: Derwin Abrahams
- Screenplay by: Basil Dickey
- Produced by: Louis Gray
- Starring: Jimmy Wakely; Dub Taylor; Virginia Belmont; Riley Hill; Marshall Reed; Steve Clark
- Cinematography: Harry Neumann
- Edited by: John C. Fuller
- Production company: Monogram Pictures
- Distributed by: Monogram Pictures
- Release date: April 26, 1948
- Running time: 56 minutes
- Country: United States
- Language: English

The Rangers Ride is a 1948 American Western film directed by Derwin Abrahams and written by Basil Dickey. The film stars Jimmy Wakely, Dub Taylor, Virginia Belmont, Riley Hill, Marshall Reed and Steve Clark. The film was released on April 26, 1948 by Monogram Pictures.

== Cast ==
- Jimmy Wakely as Jimmy Wakely
- Dub Taylor as Cannonball Taylor
- Virginia Belmont as Sheila Carroll
- Riley Hill as Vic Sanders
- Marshall Reed as Barton
- Steve Clark as Jed Brant
- Pierce Lyden as Sgt. Hamon
- Jim Diehl as Payson
- Milburn Morante as Bullard
- Cactus Mack as Tom Murphy
- Bud Osborne as Rocky
- Bob Woodward as Bob
- Carol Henry as Kelly
- Boyd Stockman as Shayne
