= Code of the Saddle =

1947 film by Thomas Carr

- Theatrical release poster
- Directed by: Thomas Carr
- Screenplay by: Eliot Gibbons
- Produced by: Barney Sarecky
- Starring: Johnny Mack Brown; Raymond Hatton; Riley Hill; Kay Morley; William Bailey; Zon Murray
- Cinematography: Harry Neumann
- Edited by: Fred Maguire
- Production company: Monogram Pictures
- Distributed by: Monogram Pictures
- Release date: June 28, 1947
- Running time: 53 minutes
- Country: United States
- Language: English

Code of the Saddle is a 1947 American Western film directed by Thomas Carr and written by Eliot Gibbons. The film stars Johnny Mack Brown, Raymond Hatton, Riley Hill, Kay Morley, William Bailey and Zon Murray. The film was released on June 28, 1947, by Monogram Pictures.

== Cast ==
- Johnny Mack Brown as John Macklin
- Raymond Hatton as Winks
- Riley Hill as Bill Stace
- Kay Morley as Bess Bentham
- William Bailey as Sheriff Wallace
- Zon Murray as Deputy Rubio
- Ted Adams as Buck Stace
- Bud Osborne as Stubby
- Craig Duncan as Crooked Deputy
- Gary Garrett as Randall
