= Range Justice =

1949 film by Ray Taylor

- Theatrical release poster
- Directed by: Ray Taylor
- Screenplay by: Ronald Davidson
- Produced by: Barney Sarecky
- Starring: Johnny Mack Brown; Max Terhune; Tris Coffin; Riley Hill; Sarah Padden; Eddie Parker
- Cinematography: Harry Neumann
- Edited by: John C. Fuller
- Production company: Monogram Pictures
- Distributed by: Monogram Pictures
- Release date: July 16, 1949
- Running time: 57 minutes
- Country: United States
- Language: English

Range Justice is a 1949 American Western film directed by Ray Taylor and written by Ronald Davidson. The film stars Johnny Mack Brown, Max Terhune, Tris Coffin, Riley Hill, Sarah Padden and Eddie Parker. The film was released on July 16, 1949, by Monogram Pictures.

== Cast ==
- Johnny Mack Brown as Johnny Mack Brown
- Max Terhune as Alibi
- Tris Coffin as Ed Dutton
- Riley Hill as Glenn Hadley
- Sarah Padden as Ma Curtis
- Eddie Parker as Lacey
- Fred Kohler Jr. as Stoner
- Felice Ingersoll as Beth Hadley
- Kenne Duncan as Kirk
- Myron Healey as Dade
- Bill Hale as Bud
- Bill Potter as Bill
