= Pierce Lyden =

American actor

- Born: January 2, 1908; Hildreth, Nebraska
- Died: October 10, 1998 (aged 90); Orange, California
- Other name: Pierce Lydon
- Education: Emerson College of Oratory
- Alma mater: University of Nebraska
- Occupations: Actor; Stuntman; Writer; Author
- Years active: 1933–1962
- Awards: Golden Boot Award

Pierce W. Lyden (January 8, 1908 – October 10, 1998) was an American stage, film, television and stunt actor best known for his work in Westerns.

== Early life and education ==
Lyden was born in a sod house on a ranch near Hildreth, Nebraska on January 8, 1908. The son of a horse buyer for the U.S. Army cavalry, he acquired riding skills as a youngster that later made it possible for him to do his own stunts as an actor in Hollywood westerns.

He graduated high school in Naponee, Nebraska, and acted in several plays there. He graduated from the University of Nebraska School of Music and Fine Arts in 1927 and later studied at the Emerson College of Oratory in Boston.

== Career ==
=== Early years ===
Lyden supported himself in these early years by playing romantic leads in stock company productions at Lincoln's Liberty Theater and on the road, and appeared in a few Chautauqua presentations. Soon after graduating from the University of Nebraska, he joined the United Chautauqua System, taking the leading role in its production of The Family Upstairs.

=== Hollywood ===
When talking movies eclipsed live theater presentations in small towns, Pierce Lyden went on to Hollywood in 1932 and appeared in his first Western film in 1933. He played villains' roles in B Western films, quickly becoming typecast as a "bad guy." Due to his excellence in horsemanship, he also performed stunts, and specialized in fight scenes. He appeared in Saturday serials called cliffhangers as well as in feature films and television series.

The number of his feature film roles has been estimated at between 300 and 400, many as "uncredited" since actors who did not have major parts were not listed in film credits. Some twenty-five of these film appearances were for Republic Pictures between 1940 and 1951.

Lyden made about a hundred episode appearances on television series such as The Cisco Kid, Wild Bill Hickok, Bat Masterson, and The Lone Ranger.

He worked with some of the most famous Western movie actors, including Roy Rogers, Gene Autry, Hopalong Cassidy, and John Wayne, portraying Campbell, the Colonel's wagon train scout in Red River (1948). He was Photo Press Fan Poll's "Villain of the Year" in 1944.

=== Retirement ===
In 1962, as the popularity of Westerns lessened, Lyden retired in Orange, California, where he had lived throughout his acting career. He wrote "Action Shots" about film personalities for the Orange County, California, Register, and the film industry magazine Classic Images. He published five books about his career and the making of films in his era. In his later years he was regularly invited to film festivals in the U.S. and abroad.

== Awards ==
Honors awarded him included membership in the Cowboy Hall of Fame and Heritage Foundation (1979) and the Golden Boot Award (1992).

In 1989 Naponee, Nebraska, named a street for him and held a Pierce Lyden film festival. In 1996, a Golden Palm Star on the Palm Springs, California, Walk of Stars was dedicated to him. In 1997 he received Nebraska's Buffalo Bill Award.

== Personal life and death ==
Lyden had one son, Donald Pierce Lyden, an attorney who had three children with his wife Kathleen. Lyden was married January 29, 1929, but received an annulment March 18, 1931, alleging that he had not seen his wife, Margerie Ann, since two hours after the wedding.

Lyden died at his Orange, California home on October 10, 1998, aged 90, and was buried at Fairhaven Memorial Park in Santa Ana, California.

== Filmography ==
=== Film ===
- 1941: The Get-Away – Gangster
- 1941: King of Dodge City – Reynolds
- 1942: Undercover Man – Burt
- 1942: Baby Face Morgan – Gap
- 1942: They Raid by Night – Braun
- 1942: One Thrilling Night – Duke Keesler
- 1943: California Joe – Harper
- 1943: Canyon City – Mac
- 1943: The Blocked Trail – Rankin
- 1943: False Colors – Lefty
- 1943: The Black Hills Express – Carl
- 1943: Border Patrol – Loren
- 1943: Dead Man's Gulch – Curley Welch
- 1943: Death Valley Manhunt – Clayton
- 1943: Fugitive from Sonora – Bill Slade
- 1944: Ali Baba and the Forty Thieves – Guard
- 1944: Firebrands of Arizona – Gopher
- 1944: Trigger Law – Ace
- 1944: Texas Masquerade – Al
- 1944: Mystery Man – Red
- 1945: Trail to Vengeance – Sam
- 1945: The Cherokee Flash – Clint Hawkins
- 1945: Bad Men of the Border – Joe (uncredited)
- 1945: Code of the Lawless – Pete
- 1946: Magnificent Doll – Watch leader
- 1946: Rainbow Over Texas – Iverson
- 1946: Shadows on the Range – Ed
- 1946: Wild Beauty – Roy
- 1946: Roll on Texas Moon – Stuhler
- 1946: Trigger Fingers – Red
- 1946: Alias Billy the Kid – Sam
- 1947: The Fabulous Texan – Captain
- 1947: Raiders of the South – Marshal Jim Farley
- 1947: Song of the Wasteland – Forrester
- 1947: Rustlers of Devil's Canyon – Matt
- 1947: The Adventures of Don Coyote – Jeff
- 1947: Valley of Fear – Sheriff Wheeler
- 1947: Six-Gun Serenade – Buck
- 1948: Blazing Across the Pecos – Jason
- 1948: Crossed Trails – Whitfield
- 1948: Six-Gun Law – Marshal Jack Reed
- 1948: Back Trail – Frank Gilmore
- 1948: The Rangers Ride – Hamen
- 1948: Dead Man's Gold – Sliver
- 1948: Silver Trails– Ramsay
- 1948: Red River – Campbell (uncredited)
- 1949: The Gal Who Took the West – O'Hara Cowhand with Lee (uncredited)
- 1949: The Big Sombrero – Farmer
- 1949: Shadows of the West – Jordon
- 1950: The Gunfighter – Barfly (uncredited)
- 1950: Twilight in the Sierras – Blake
- 1950: Pygmy Island – Lucas
- 1950: Covered Wagon Raid – Brag
- 1951: Stagecoach Driver – Larry Edwards
- 1951: Whistling Hills – Cassidy, horse thief
- 1951: Government Agents vs. Phantom Legion – Armstrong
- 1951: Man from Sonora – Creel
- 1951: Nevada Badmen – Sheriff Connelly
- 1952: Texas City – Marshal George Markham
- 1952: Canyon Ambush – Rancher John Brackett
- 1952: Kansas Territory – Dr. Stanley Johnson
- 1952: Waco – Farley
- 1952: Carson City – Guard
- 1952: Montana Belle – Deputy
- 1953: Calamity Jane – Citizen (uncredited)
- 1955: The Phantom from 10,000 Leagues – Andy, Janitor
- 1956: The Women of Pitcairn Island – Dan Scruggs
- 1956: The First Traveling Saleslady – Outlaw (uncredited)
- 1958: Gunman's Walk – Townsman
- 1962: The Wild Westerners – Jake (uncredited, final film role)

=== Television ===
Pierce Lyden television credits
Year	Title	Role	Notes	Ref.
1951–1956	The Cisco Kid	Vic / Dana / Carl Barton	4 episodes	
1951–1956	Wild Bill Hickok	Clint Morgan / Henchman Powers / Judge Morton	3 episodes	
1952–1956	The Roy Rogers Show	Vallon / Craig Ormond / Carl Posing as Carter & Graham	3 episodes	
1953–1954	The Gene Autry Show	Red, Lead Robber / Henchman with Mustache / Henchman Vince Keys / Bank Teller	4 episodes	
1956–1957	Sergeant Preston of the Yukon	Jiffy Tyler / Larry Bates / Prospector / Sam Jackson	4 episodes	
1957	The Lone Ranger	Gil Ryan / Earl Bennett / Reese Talman	3 episodes	
1957–1959	Tales of Wells Fargo	Blacksmith / Doc Mills / Cold Creek Sheriff	3 episodes	
1958, 1960	The Life and Legend of Wyatt Earp	Markum / Saloon Owner	2 episodes	
1959	Bat Masterson	Blacksmith	1 episode	
1962	Cheyenne	Marshal Holland	1 episode	
