= Border Bandits =

1946 film by Lambert Hillyer

- Theatrical release poster
- Directed by: Lambert Hillyer; Eddie Davis
- Written by: Frank H. Young
- Produced by: Scott R. Dunlap; Charles J. Bigelow
- Starring: Johnny Mack Brown; Raymond Hatton; John Merton
- Edited by: Carrol Lewis
- Music by: Frank Sanucci
- Production company: Monogram Distributing Corp.
- Distributed by: Great Western Productions
- Release date: January 12, 1946 (United States)
- Running time: 58 minutes
- Country: United States
- Language: English

Border Bandits is a 1946 American Western film directed by Lambert Hillyer. It is the nineteenth film in the "Marshal Nevada Jack McKenzie" series, and stars Johnny Mack Brown as Jack McKenzie and Raymond Hatton as his sidekick Sandy Hopkins, with Riley Hill, Rosa del Rosario and John Merton.

== Cast ==
- Johnny Mack Brown as Nevada McKenzie
- Raymond Hatton as Sandy Hopkins
- Riley Hill as Steve Halliday
- Rosa del Rosario as Celia
- John Merton as Spike
- Tom Quinn as Pepper
- Frank La Rue as John Halliday
- Steve Clark as Doc Bowles
- Charles Stevens as José
- Lucio Villegas as Gonzales
- Bud Osborne as Dutch
- Pat R. McGee as Cupid
