= Law of the Range =

1941 film by Ray Taylor

- Directed by: Ray Taylor
- Screenplay by: Sherman L. Lowe; Charles E. Barnes
- Produced by: Will Cowan
- Starring: Johnny Mack Brown; Fuzzy Knight; Nell O'Day
- Cinematography: Charles Van Enger
- Edited by: Edward Curtiss
- Music by: Hans J. Salter
- Production company: Universal Pictures
- Distributed by: Universal Pictures
- Release date: June 20, 1941
- Running time: 59 minutes
- Country: United States
- Language: English

Law of the Range is a 1941 American Western film directed by Ray Taylor using a screenplay by Sherman L. Lowe which is based on a story by Charles E. Barnes. A Universal production, the film starred Johnny Mack Brown, Fuzzy Knight, Nell O'Day and Riley Hill. AllMovie states it is a remake of another Ray Taylor film, the 1935 feature The Ivory-Handled Gun.

== Plot ==
Steve Howard arrives at the Diamond T Ranch during a fight between rival families, the O'Briens and the Howards, the latter being helped by Squint Jamison.

== Cast ==
- Johnny Mack Brown as Steve Howard
- Fuzzy Knight as Chap Chaparral
- Nell O'Day as Mary O'Brien
- Riley Hill (credited as Roy Harris) as Wolverine Kid
- Janet Warren (credited as Elaine Morey) as Virginia O'Brien
- Pat O'Malley as Howard
- Hal Taliaferro as Tim O'Brien
- Charles King as Walt
- Ethan Laidlaw as Hobart
- Jack Rockwell as Sheriff Henderson
- Alan Bridge as Squint Jamison
- Jerome Harte as Kurt
- Terry Frost as Sam Emery

== Production ==
This black-and-white film is said to consist of 6 reels and the plot 'suggested by a story by Charles E. Barnes.'

== Release ==
The film was released in the United States on July 20, 1941.

== Music ==
The film includes the song 'Pals of the Prairie' (by Robert Crawford) played by The KCBS-Texas Rangers.
