= Johnny Mack Brown =

American football player and actor (1904-1974)

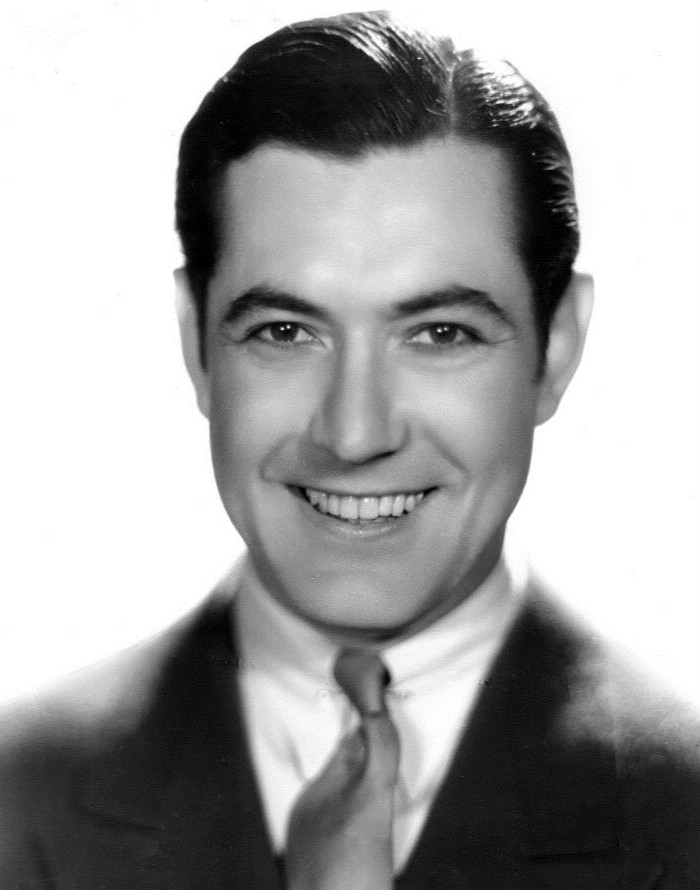
- Brown in 1935
- Born: John Brown; September 1, 1904; Dothan, Alabama, U.S.
- Died: November 14, 1974 (aged 70); Woodland Hills, California, U.S.
- Occupation: Actor
- Years active: 1927–1966
- Spouse: Cornelia "Connie" Foster (m.1926)
- Football career

No. 17
- Position: Halfback

Personal information
- Listed height: 5 ft 11 in (1.80 m)
- Listed weight: 160 lb (73 kg)

Career information
- High school: Dothan
- College: Alabama (1924–1925)

Awards and highlights
- National champion (1925); 2× SoCon champion (1924, 1925); Third-team All-American (1925); All-Southern (1925); Rose Bowl MVP (1926)
- College Football Hall of Fame

John Brown (September 1, 1904 – November 14, 1974) was an American college football player and film actor billed as John Mack Brown at the height of his screen career. He acted and starred mainly in Western films.

== Early life ==
Born and raised in Dothan, Alabama, Brown was the son of Ed and Mattie Brown, one of eight siblings. His parents were shopkeepers.

He was a star of the high school football team, earning a football scholarship to the University of Alabama. His little brother Tolbert "Red" Brown played with "Mack" in 1925.

A depiction of a juke made by Brown, dodging a tackler in the open field without using a stiff arm.

=== University of Alabama ===
While at the University of Alabama, Brown became an initiated member of Kappa Sigma fraternity.

==== Football ====
Brown was a prominent halfback on his university's Crimson Tide football team, coached by Wallace Wade. He earned the nickname "The Dothan Antelope" and was inducted into the College Football Hall of Fame. Pop Warner called him "one of the fastest football players I've ever seen."

"Mack" Brown in football uniform

The 1924 team lost only to Centre. Brown starred in the defeat of Georgia Tech.

Brown helped the 1925 Alabama Crimson Tide football team to a national championship. In that season's Rose Bowl, he earned Most Valuable Player honors after scoring two of his team's three touchdowns in an upset win over the heavily favored Washington Huskies. The 1925 Crimson Tide was the first southern team to ever win a Rose Bowl. The game is commonly referred to as "the game that changed the south." Brown was selected All-Southern.

==== After college ====
After he finished college, he sold insurance and later coached the freshman running backs on the University of Alabama's football team.

== Film career ==
=== Starting at the top ===
Brown's good looks and powerful physique saw him portrayed on Wheaties cereal boxes and in 1927, brought an offer for motion picture screen tests that resulted in a long and successful career in Hollywood. That same year, he signed a five-year contract with Metro–Goldwyn–Mayer (MGM). He played silent film star Mary Pickford's love interest in her first talkie, Coquette (1929), for which Pickford won an Oscar.

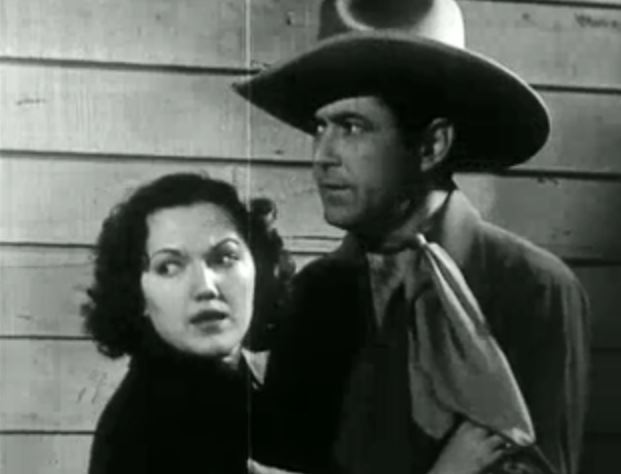
Brown with Lois January in 1936

He appeared in minor roles until 1930 when he was cast as the star in a Western entitled Billy the Kid directed by King Vidor. An early widescreen film (along with Raoul Walsh's The Big Trail starring John Wayne, produced the same year), the movie also stars Wallace Beery as Pat Garrett. Brown was billed over Beery, who would become MGM's highest-paid actor within the next three years. Also in 1930, Brown played Joan Crawford's love interest in Montana Moon. Brown went on to make several more top-flight movies under the name John Mack Brown, including The Secret Six (1931) with Wallace Beery, Jean Harlow, and Clark Gable, as well as the legendary Lost Generation celebration of alcohol, The Last Flight (1931), and was being groomed by MGM as a leading man until being abruptly replaced on Laughing Sinners in 1931, with all his scenes reshot, substituting rising star Clark Gable in his place. MGM and director Woody Van Dyke screen tested him for the lead role of Tarzan the Ape Man but Van Dyke did not feel he was tall enough.

=== Steep decline ===
Rechristened "Johnny Mack Brown" in the wake of this extremely serious career downturn, he made a number of low-budget westerns for independent producers though never regained his former status. Eventually he became one of the screen's top B-movie cowboys, and became a popular star at Universal Pictures in 1937. After starring in four serials, in 1939 he launched a series of 29 B-westerns over the next four years, all co-starring Fuzzy Knight as his comic sidekick, and the last seven teaming him with Tex Ritter. This is considered the peak of his B-western career, thanks to the studio's superior production values; noteworthy titles include Son of Roaring Dan, Raiders of San Joaquin and The Lone Star Trail, the latter featuring a young Robert Mitchum as the muscle heavy. A fan of Mexican music, Brown showcased the talents of guitarist Francisco Mayorga and The Guadalajara Trio in films like Boss of Bullion City and The Masked Rider. Brown also starred in a 1933 Mascot Pictures serial Fighting with Kit Carson, and four serials for Universal (Rustlers of Red Dog, Wild West Days, Flaming Frontiers and The Oregon Trail).

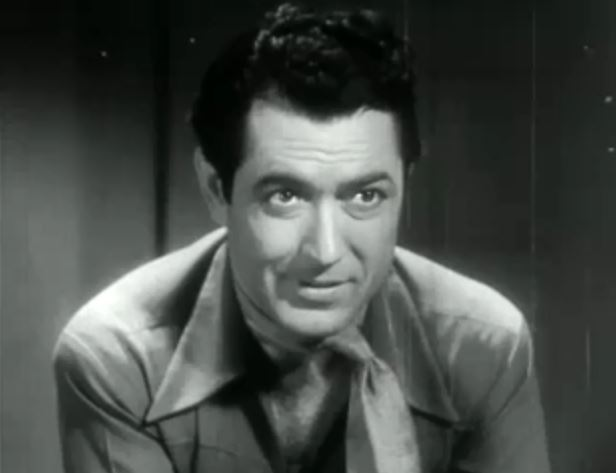
In Rogue of the Range, 1936

Brown moved to Monogram Pictures in 1943 to replace that studio's cowboy star Buck Jones, who had died months before. Brown's Monogram series was immediately successful and he starred in more than 60 westerns over the next 10 years, including a 20-movie series playing "Nevada Jack McKenzie" opposite Buck Jones's (and earlier Wallace Beery's) old sidekick Raymond Hatton, beginning with the 1943 film The Ghost Rider. Brown was also featured in two higher-budgeted dramas, Forever Yours and Flame of the West, both released by Monogram in 1945 and both billing the actor under his former "A-picture" name, John Mack Brown.

When Monogram abandoned its brand name in 1952 (in favor of its deluxe division, Allied Artists), Johnny Mack Brown retired from the screen. He returned more than 10 years later to appear in secondary roles in a few Western films. Altogether, Brown appeared in more than 160 movies between 1927 and 1966, as well as a smattering of television shows, in a career spanning almost 40 years.

== Personal life ==
Brown was married to Cornelia "Connie" Foster from 1926 until his death in 1974, and they had four children.

== Recognition ==
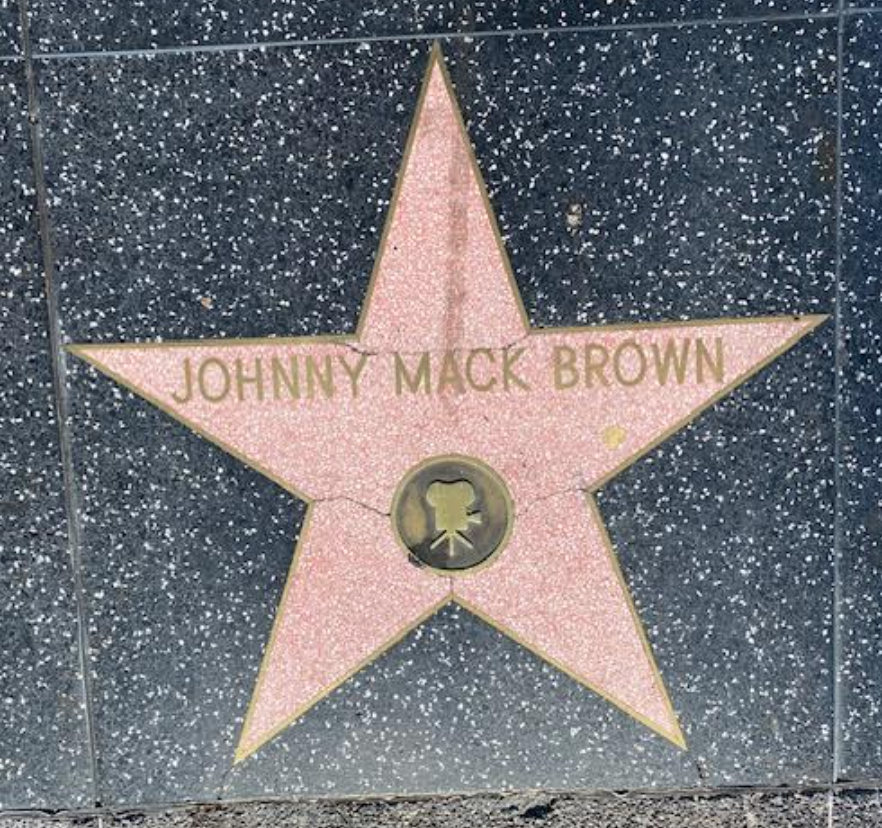
Johnny Mack Brown's star on the Hollywood Walk of Fame.

For his contributions to the film industry, Brown was inducted into the Hollywood Walk of Fame in 1960 with a motion pictures star at 6101 Hollywood Boulevard. He received a posthumous Golden Boot Award in 2004 for his contributions to the Western entertainment genre. In 1969, Brown was inducted into the Alabama Sports Hall of Fame.

Brown's hometown holds an annual Johnny Mack Brown Western Festival because "If anyone ever brought attention to Dothan, it was Johnny Mack Brown," a city official said.

== In popular culture ==
Brown is mentioned in the novel From Here to Eternity. In a barracks scene, soldiers discuss Western films, and one asks, "Remember Johnny Mack Brown?", resulting in a discussion.

From March 1950 to February 1959, Dell Comics published a Johnny Mack Brown series of comic books. He also was included in 21 issues of Dell's Giant Series Western Roundup comics that began in June 1952.

In 1974, The Statler Brothers, performing as the fictitious Lester "Roadhog" Moran and the Cadillac Cowboys, released Alive at the Johnny Mack Brown High School, a comedy album set at an equally fictitious school named after Brown. Brown is also mentioned in the song "Whatever Happened To Randolph Scott" by The Statler Brothers.

The 1949 rockabilly song ‘Rockin’ at the Ritz’ by Ray Campi contains a mention of Johnny Mack Brown.

== Death ==
Brown died in Woodland Hills, California, of heart failure at the age of 70. His cremated remains are interred in an outdoor Columbarium, in Glendale's Forest Lawn Memorial Park Cemetery.

== Selected filmography ==
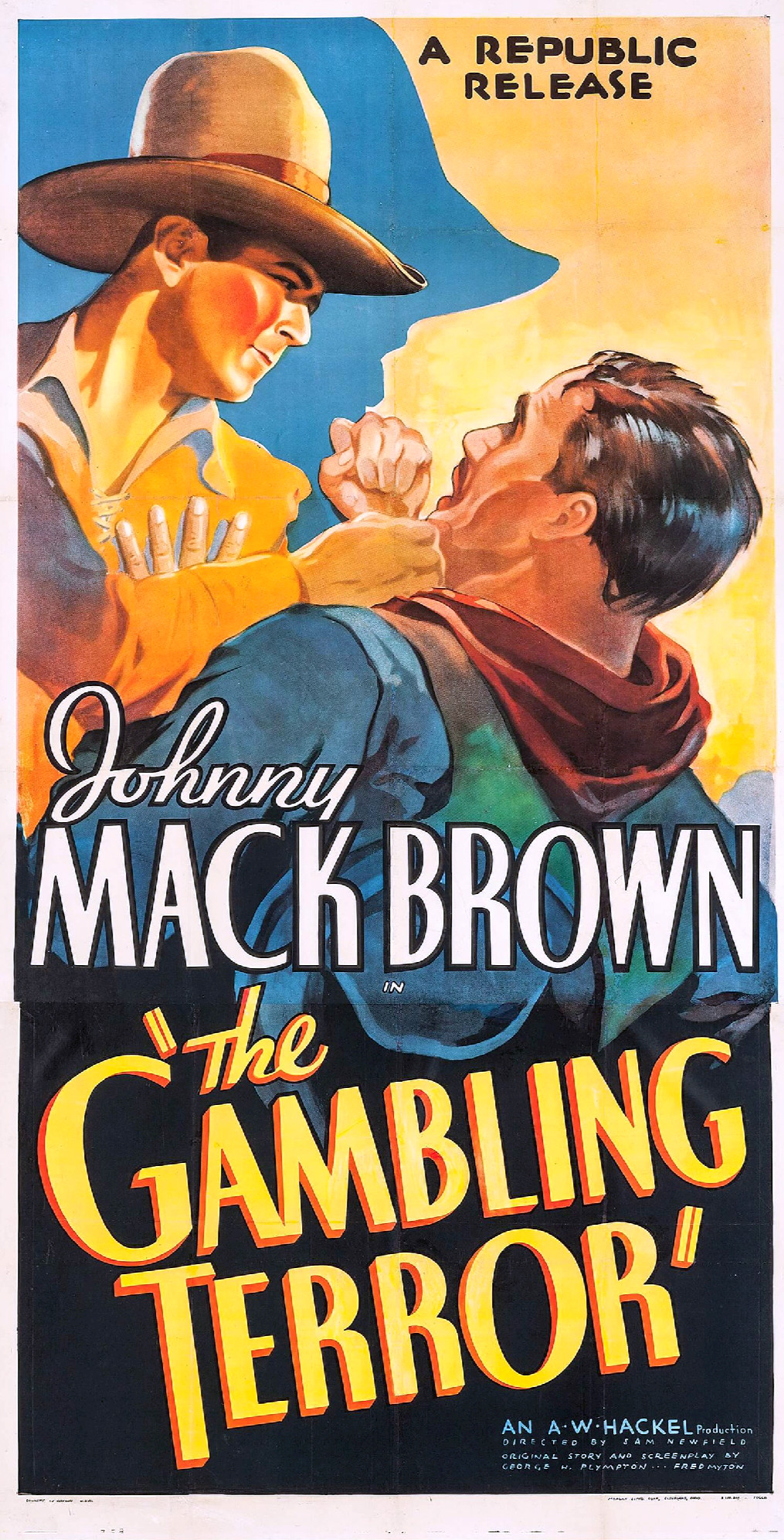
Poster for The Gambling Terror (1937)

- Slide, Kelly, Slide (1927) as Himself
- The Bugle Call (1927) bit part (uncredited)
- Mockery (1927) as Russian Officer (uncredited)
- After Midnight (1927) as Party Boy (uncredited)
- The Fair Co-Ed (1927) as Bob
- The Divine Woman (1928) as Jean Lery
- Soft Living (1928) as Stockney Webb
- Square Crooks (1928) as Larry Scott
- The Play Girl (1928) as Bradley Lane
- Our Dancing Daughters (1928) as Ben Blaine
- Annapolis (1928) as Bill
- A Lady of Chance (1928) as Steve Crandall
- A Woman of Affairs (1928) as David Furness
- Coquette (1929) as Michael Jeffery
- The Valiant (1929) as Robert Ward
- The Single Standard (1929) as Tommy Hewlett
- Hurricane (1929) as Dan
- Jazz Heaven (1929) as Barry Holmes
- Undertow (1930) as Paul Whalen
- Montana Moon (1930) as Larry
- Billy the Kid (1930) as Billy the Kid
- Great Day (1930) (incomplete & unreleased)
- The Great Meadow (1931) as Berk Jarvis
- The Secret Six (1931) as Hank Rogers
- The Last Flight (1931) as Bill Talbot
- Lasca of the Rio Grande (1931) as Miles Kincaid
- Flames (1932) as Charlie
- The Vanishing Frontier (1932) as Kirby Tornell
- 70,000 Witnesses (1932) as Wally Clark
- Malay Nights (1932) as Jim Wilson
- Fighting with Kit Carson (1933) as Kit Carson, SERIAL
- Saturday's Millions (1933) as Alan Barry
- Female (1933) as Cooper
- Son of a Sailor (1933) as 'Duke'
- Three on a Honeymoon (1934) as Chuck Wells
- St. Louis Woman (1934) as Jim Warren
- Marrying Widows (1934) as The Husband
- Cross Streets (1934) as Adam Blythe
- Belle of the Nineties (1934) as Brooks Claybourne
- Against the Law (1934) as Steve Wayne
- Rustlers of Red Dog (1935) as Jack Wood, SERIAL
- Branded a Coward (1935) as Johnny Hume
- Between Men (1935) as Johnny Wellington Jr.
- The Courageous Avenger (1935) as Kirk Baxter
- Valley of the Lawless (1936) as Bruce Reynolds
- Desert Phantom (1936) as Billy Donovan
- Rogue of the Range (1936) as Dan Doran
- Everyman's Law (1936) as Johnny – aka The Dog Town Kid
- The Crooked Trail (1936) as Jim Blake
- Undercover Man (1936) as Steve McLain
- Lawless Land (1936) as Ranger Jeff Hayden
- The Gambling Terror (1937) as Jeff Hayes
- Trail of Vengeance (1937) as Ken Early / Dude Ramsey
- Bar-Z Bad Men (1937) as Jim Waters
- Guns in the Dark (1937) as Johnny Darrel
- A Lawman Is Born (1937) as Tom Mitchell
- Wild West Days (1937) as Kentucky Wade, SERIAL
- Boothill Brigade (1937) as Lon Cardigan
- Born to the West (1937) as Tom Fillmore
- Wells Fargo (1937) as Talbot Carter
- Flaming Frontiers (1938) as Tex Houston, SERIAL
- The Oregon Trail (1939) as Jeff Scott, SERIAL
- Desperate Trails (1939) as Steve Hayden
- Oklahoma Frontier (1939) as Jeff McLeod
- Chip of the Flying U (1939) as 'Chip' Bennett
- West of Carson City (1940) as Jim Bannister
- Boss of Bullion City (1940) as Tom Bryant
- Riders of Pasco Basin (1940) as Lee Jamison
- Bad Man from Red Butte (1940) as Gils Brady / Buck Halliday
- Son of Roaring Dan (1940) as Jim Reardon
- Ragtime Cowboy Joe (1940) as Steve Logan
- Law and Order (1940) as Bill Ralston
- Pony Post (1940) as Cal Sheridan
- Bury Me Not on the Lone Prairie (1941) as Joe Henderson
- Law of the Range (1941) as Steve Howard
- Rawhide Rangers (1941) as Brand Calhoun
- Man from Montana (1941) as Sheriff Bob Dawson
- The Masked Rider (1941) as Larry Prescott
- Arizona Cyclone (1941) as Tom Baxter
- Fighting Bill Fargo (1941) as Bill Fargo
- Stagecoach Buckaroo (1942) as Steve Hardin
- Ride 'Em Cowboy (1942) as Alabam' Brewster
- The Silver Bullet (1942) as 'Silver Jim' Donovan
- Boss of Hangtown Mesa (1942) as Steve Collins
- Deep in the Heart of Texas (1942) as Jim Mallory
- Little Joe, the Wrangler (1942) as Neal Wallace
- The Old Chisholm Trail (1942) as Dusty Gardner
- Tenting Tonight on the Old Camp Ground (1943) as Wade Benson
- The Ghost Rider (1943) as Nevada Jack McKenzie
- Cheyenne Roundup (1943) as Buck Brandon & Gils Brandon
- Raiders of San Joaquin (1943) as 'Rocky' Morgan
- The Stranger from Pecos (1943) as Nevada Jack McKenzie
- Six Gun Gospel (1943) as Marshal Nevada Jack McKenzie
- The Lone Star Trail (1943) as Blaze Barker
- Crazy House (1943) as Himself
- Outlaws of Stampede Pass (1943) as Marshal Nevada Jack McKenzie
- The Texas Kid (1943) as Nevada Jack McKenzie
- Raiders of the Border (1944) as Nevada Jack McKenzie
- Partners of the Trail (1944) as U.S. Marshal Nevada Jack McKenzie
- Law Men (1944) as U.S. Marshal Nevada Jack McKenzie
- Range Law (1944) as U.S. Marshal Nevada McKenzie
- West of the Rio Grande (1944) as U.S. Marshal 'Nevada Jack' McKenzie
- Land of the Outlaws (1944) as Marshal Nevada Jack McKenzie
- Law of the Valley (1944) as Marshal Nevada McKenzie
- Ghost Guns (1944) as Marshal Nevada Jack McKenzie
- The Navajo Trail (1945) as Marshal Nevada – aka Rocky Saunders
- Forever Yours (1945) as Maj. Tex O'Connor
- Gun Smoke (1945) as Marshal Nevada Jack McKenzie
- Stranger from Santa Fe (1945) as U.S. Marshal Nevada McKenzie, posing as Roy Ferris
- Flame of the West (1945) as Dr. John Poole
- The Lost Trail (1945) as Marshal Nevada Jack McKenzie
- Frontier Feud (1945) as Marshal Nevada Jack McKenzie
- Border Bandits (1946) as Marshal Nevada
- Drifting Along (1946) as Steve Garner
- The Haunted Mine (1946) as Marshal Nevada Jack McKenzie
- Under Arizona Skies (1946) as Dusty Smith
- The Gentleman from Texas (1946) as Johnny Macklin
- Trigger Fingers (1946) as Sam 'Hurricane' Benton
- Shadows on the Range (1946) as Steve Mason – Posing as Steve Saunders
- Silver Range (1946) as Johnny Bronton
- Raiders of the South (1947) as Captain Johnny Brownell
- Valley of Fear (1947) as Johnny Williams
- Trailing Danger (1947) as Johnny
- Land of the Lawless (1947) as Johnny Mack
- The Law Comes to Gunsight (1947) as Johnny Macklin
- Code of the Saddle (1947) as John Macklin
- Flashing Guns (1947) as Johnny Mack
- Prairie Express (1947) as Johnny Hudson
- Gun Talk (1947) as Johnny McVey
- Overland Trails (1948) as Johnny Murdock
- Crossed Trails (1948) as Johnny Mack
- Frontier Agent (1948) as Himself
- Triggerman (1948) as Himself
- Back Trail (1948) as Johnny Mack
- The Fighting Ranger (1948) as Ranger Johnny Brown
- The Sheriff of Medicine Bow (1948) as Sheriff Johnny
- Gunning for Justice (1948) as Johnny Mack
- Hidden Danger (1948) as Johnny Mack
- Law of the West (1949) as Federal Agent Johnny Mack
- Trails End (1949) as Johnny Mack
- Stampede (1949) as Sheriff Aaron Ball
- West of El Dorado (1949) as Johnny Mack
- Law of the West (1949) as Johnny Mack
- Range Justice (1949) as Himself
- Western Renegades (1949) as Himself
- West of Wyoming (1950) as Himself
- Over the Border (1950) as Himself
- Six Gun Mesa (1950) as Himself
- Law of the Panhandle (1950) as Himself
- Outlaw Gold (1950) as Himself
- Short Grass (1950) as Sheriff Ord Keown
- Colorado Ambush (1951) as Himself
- Man from Sonora (1951) as Himself
- Blazing Bullets (1951) as Marshal
- Montana Desperado (1951) as Himself
- Oklahoma Justice (1951) as Himself
- Whistling Hills (1951) as Himself
- Texas Lawmen (1951) as Marshall
- Texas City (1952) as Himself
- Man from the Black Hills (1952) as Himself
- Dead Man's Trail (1952) as Himself
- Canyon Ambush (1952) as Himself
- The Marshal's Daughter (1953) as Poker-Game Player #2
- Requiem for a Gunfighter (1965) as Enkoff
- The Bounty Killer (1965) as Sheriff Green
- Apache Uprising (1965) as Sheriff Ben Hall (final film role)
