= Gun Smoke (1945 film) =

1945 film by Howard Bretherton

- Directed by: Howard Bretherton
- Written by: Frank H. Young
- Produced by: Charles J. Bigelow
- Starring: See below
- Cinematography: Marcel Le Picard
- Edited by: John M. Foley
- Music by: Edward J. Kay
- Production company: Monogram Pictures
- Distributed by: Monogram Pictures
- Release date: February 16, 1945
- Running time: 57 minutes
- Country: United States
- Language: English

Gun Smoke is a 1945 American Western film directed by Howard Bretherton. This is the fifteenth film in the "Marshal Nevada Jack McKenzie" series, and stars Johnny Mack Brown as Jack McKenzie and Raymond Hatton as his sidekick Sandy Hopkins, with Jennifer Holt, Riley Hill and Wen Wright.

== Plot ==
"Nevada Jack" McKenzie, retired marshal, comes upon a toppled stagecoach with two dead bodies. In the town of Pawnee, he learns that one of the victims, Hinkley, was an archaeologist who apparently had discovered the whereabouts of hidden Indian treasure.

With his friend Sandy Hopkins disguising himself as a medicine man, Nevada Jack investigates and finds that saloonkeeper Lucky Baker is behind the crimes, helped by a hired gun called Knuckles. With the help of cafe owner Jane and the dead man's son, Joel Hinkley, the two marshals fend off Lucky and his criminal band.

== Cast ==
- Johnny Mack Brown as Marshal Nevada Jack McKenzie
- Raymond Hatton as Marshal Sandy
- Jennifer Holt as Jane Condon
- Riley Hill as Joel Hinkley
- Wen Wright as Henchman Knuckles
- Earle Hodgins as Sheriff Fin Elder
- Ray Bennett as Lucky Baker
- Steve Clark as Henchman Soda
- Marshall Reed as Henchman Cyclone
- John L. Cason as Henchman Red
- Louis Hart as Henchman
- Frank Ellis as Henchman Deuce
- Roy Butler as Sheriff
- Kansas Moehring as Henchman Whitey
- Dimas Sotello as Shag, Indian Guide
