= Hildreth, Nebraska =

- Village
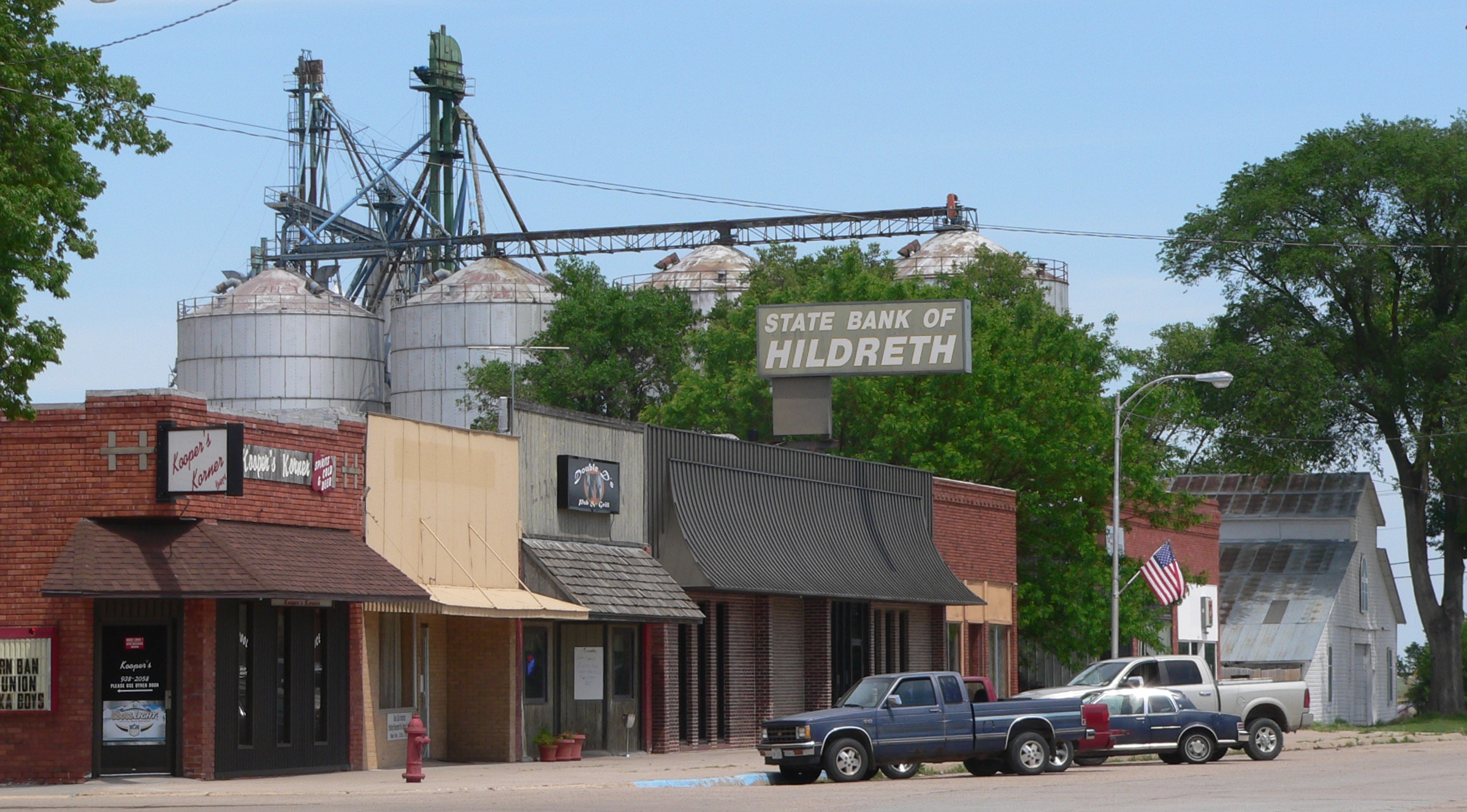
- Downtown Hildreth: west side of Commercial Avenue
- Motto(s): Small Town, Big Family
- Location of Hildreth, Nebraska
- Coordinates: 40°20′16″N 99°02′45″W
- Country: United States
- State: Nebraska
- County: Franklin

Area
  - Total: 0.57 sq mi (1.48 km^{2})
  - Land: 0.57 sq mi (1.48 km^{2})
  - Water: 0 sq mi (0.00 km^{2})
- Elevation: 2,179 ft (664 m)

Population (2020)
  - Total: 377
  - Density: 659.4/sq mi (254.58/km^{2})
- Time zone: UTC-6 (Central (CST))
  - Summer (DST): UTC-5 (CDT)
- ZIP code: 68947
- Area code: 308
- FIPS code: 31-22430
- GNIS feature ID: 2398504
- Website: https://villageofhildreth.com/

Hildreth is a village in Franklin County, Nebraska, United States. The population was 378 at the 2010 census.

== History ==
Hildreth was founded in 1886 when the railroad was extended to that point. It was named for Carson Hildreth, one of the original owners of the town site.

== Geography ==
According to the United States Census Bureau, the village has a total area of 0.57 square miles (1.48 km^{2}), all land.

== Demographics ==
Historical population
Census	Pop.	Note	%±
1890	141		—
1900	249		76.6%
1910	450		80.7%
1920	453		0.7%
1930	400		−11.7%
1940	361		−9.7%
1950	374		3.6%
1960	305		−18.4%
1970	352		15.4%
1980	394		11.9%
1990	364		−7.6%
2000	370		1.6%
2010	378		2.2%
2020	377		−0.3%
U.S. Decennial Census

=== 2010 census ===
As of the census of 2010, there were 378 people, 177 households, and 113 families residing in the village. The population density was 663.2 inhabitants per square mile (256.1/km^{2}). There were 193 housing units at an average density of 338.6 per square mile (130.7/km^{2}). The racial makeup of the village was 97.9% White, 1.6% from other races, and 0.5% from two or more races. Hispanic or Latino of any race were 2.6% of the population.

There were 177 households, of which 24.9% had children under the age of 18 living with them, 52.0% were married couples living together, 7.9% had a female householder with no husband present, 4.0% had a male householder with no wife present, and 36.2% were non-families. 32.8% of all households were made up of individuals, and 14.7% had someone living alone who was 65 years of age or older. The average household size was 2.14 and the average family size was 2.65.

The median age in the village was 46.4 years. 19.6% of residents were under the age of 18; 7.2% were between the ages of 18 and 24; 21.1% were from 25 to 44; 31.4% were from 45 to 64; and 20.6% were 65 years of age or older. The gender makeup of the village was 49.7% male and 50.3% female.

=== 2000 census ===
As of the census of 2000, there were 370 people, 172 households, and 114 families residing in the village. The population density was 671.5 inhabitants per square mile (259.3/km^{2}). There were 191 housing units at an average density of 346.6 per square mile (133.8/km^{2}). The racial makeup of the village was 99.73% White, and 0.27% from two or more races.

There were 172 households, out of which 27.3% had children under the age of 18 living with them, 58.1% were married couples living together, 5.2% had a female householder with no husband present, and 33.7% were non-families. 30.8% of all households were made up of individuals, and 19.8% had someone living alone who was 65 years of age or older. The average household size was 2.15 and the average family size was 2.63.

In the village, the population was spread out, with 21.4% under the age of 18, 3.2% from 18 to 24, 26.5% from 25 to 44, 24.9% from 45 to 64, and 24.1% who were 65 years of age or older. The median age was 44 years. For every 100 females, there were 90.7 males. For every 100 females age 18 and over, there were 85.4 males.

As of 2000 the median income for a household in the village was $34,375, and the median income for a family was $37,361. Males had a median income of $30,673 versus $22,000 for females. The per capita income for the village was $18,066. About 8.8% of families and 10.7% of the population were below the poverty line, including 16.9% of those under age 18 and 7.9% of those age 65 or over.

== Notable person ==
- Pierce Lyden (1908-1998) American actor, author, and recipient of the Golden Boot Award
