= Trigger Fingers (1946 film) =

1946 film directed by Lambert Hillyer

- Directed by: Lambert Hillyer
- Written by: Frank H. Young
- Produced by: Scott R. Dunlap
- Starring: Johnny Mack Brown; Raymond Hatton; Jennifer Holt
- Cinematography: Harry Neumann
- Edited by: Fred Maguire
- Music by: Edward J. Kay
- Production company: Monogram Pictures
- Distributed by: Monogram Pictures
- Release date: September 21, 1946
- Running time: 56 minutes
- Country: United States
- Language: English

Trigger Fingers is a 1946 American Western film directed by Lambert Hillyer and starring Johnny Mack Brown, Raymond Hatton and Jennifer Holt.

== Plot ==
Hot tempered young Jimmy Peters is goaded to drawing on and shooting Smoke Turner. Smoke is really alive, but Jimmy's wanted for murder. Evil forces in town use the opportunity to get Jimmy's Dad Pinto to sell his ranch in exchange for clearing Jimmy. Sam Benton, 'the Texas Hurricane', a surrogate son to Pinto rides into town to get Jimmy to give himself up.

== Cast ==
- Johnny Mack Brown as Sam 'Hurricane' Benton
- Raymond Hatton as Pinto Peters
- Jennifer Holt as Jane Caldwell
- Riley Hill as Jimmy Peters
- Steve Clark as Sloppy Langford
- Eddie Parker as Smoke Turner
- Ted Adams as Stub Allen
- Pierce Lyden as Red - Henchman
- Cactus Mack as Knuckles - Henchman
- Ed Cassidy as Sheriff Caldwell

== Bibliography ==
- Drew, Bernard A. Motion Picture Series and Sequels: A Reference Guide. Routledge, 2013.
