= Flame of the West (1945 film) =

1945 film

- Directed by: Lambert Hillyer
- Written by: Adele Buffington; Bennett Foster
- Produced by: Scott R. Dunlap
- Starring: Johnny Mack Brown; Raymond Hatton; Joan Woodbury
- Cinematography: Harry Neumann
- Edited by: Dan Milner
- Music by: Frank Sanucci
- Production company: Monogram Pictures
- Distributed by: Monogram Pictures
- Release date: June 25, 1945
- Running time: 71 minutes
- Country: United States
- Language: English

Flame of the West is a 1945 American Western film directed by Lambert Hillyer and starring Johnny Mack Brown, Raymond Hatton and Joan Woodbury.

== Cast ==
- Johnny Mack Brown as Dr. John Poole
- Raymond Hatton as Add Youman
- Joan Woodbury as Poppy Rand
- Douglass Dumbrille as Marshal Tom Nightlander
- Lynne Carver as Abbie Compton
- Tom Quinn as Ed - Bartender
- Harry Woods as Wilson
- Ray Bennett as Henchman Rocky
- Riley Hill as Midland - Cowhand
- Jack Ingram as Slick - Henchman
- John Merton as Carl Compton
- Jack Rockwell as Bill Knott - Rancher
- Steve Clark as Hendricks - Rancher

== Bibliography ==
- Pitts, Michael R. Western Movies: A Guide to 5,105 Feature Films. McFarland, 2012.
