= Riley Hill (actor) =

American actor (1914–1993)

- Born: Roy Lawrence Harris; March 20, 1914; Fort Worth, Texas, U.S.
- Died: September 16, 1993 (aged 79)
- Occupation: Actor
- Years active: 1937–67

Riley Hill (born Roy Lawrence Harris, March 20, 1914 – September 16, 1993) was an American actor who appeared in both film and television. Over the span of his career he appeared in 71 feature films and over a dozen television series.

== Biography ==
Born Roy Lawrence Harris on March 20, 1914, in Fort Worth, Texas, his parents were Charlie Morris Harris and Mary Irene Bowers. He began acting under his real name with a small role in the 1937 film, The Firefly. By the beginning of the next decade he was getting significant roles in Hollywood Westerns such as Law of the Range (1941), Men of the Timberland (1941), Rawhide Rangers (1941), Texas Trouble Shooters (1942), and Arizona Stage Coach (1942).

Arizona Stage Coach would be the last picture he appeared in before, in 1942, his film career was interrupted by World War II, when he was drafted into the U.S. Army. It would also be the last film he would use his real name in. After being released from military service he took up the stage name of Riley Hill, and had a significant role in 1944's Ghost Guns. During the remainder of the 1940s he had significant roles in numerous films, including Flame of the West (1945), Sheriff of Cimarron (1945), Gun Smoke (1945), Border Bandits (1946), Under Arizona Skies (1946), The Haunted Mine (1946), Trigger Fingers (1946), Flashing Guns (1947), Code of the Saddle (1947), Range Renegades (1948), and The Rangers Ride (1948). He finished the decade with featured roles in seven films in 1949, including Shadows of the West, Across the Rio Grande, Range Justice, Law of the West, and Lawless Code.

The 1950s saw Hill continue in major supporting roles, along with the occasional starring role in B Westerns, as well as lesser roles. He had one of the starring roles in 1950's Law of the Panhandle, and significant roles that same year in Six Gun Mesa and Fence Riders. After 1951 his roles began to diminish, although he did have a significant supporting role in the 1952 Western, Target, and 1953's White Lightning.

With the advent of television, Hill began to transition to that medium. He appeared in The Lone Ranger, Dick Tracy, The Gene Autry Show, and The Range Rider during the early 1950s. He had the significant role of the apostle John in the 1952 series, The Living Bible. The remainder of the decade saw him continue to appear on television, mostly in Westerns such as The Roy Rogers Show, The Cisco Kid, Adventures of Wild Bill Hickok, and The Adventures of Kit Carson. His last significant part was in a recurring role in Mackenzie's Raiders during 1958–59.

At some point in the early 1960s Hill moved to Tucson, Arizona. He only appeared in films which were shot in Arizona after this time. He had a significant role in The Trial of Billy Jack in 1974, and smaller roles in 1976's The Last Hard Men and several other films in the 1960s and 1970s. His last significant role, and second to last performance, was in When You Comin' Back, Red Ryder? (1979).

== Filmography ==
(Per AFI database)

- The Firefly (1937) credited as Roy Harris - Lieutenant
- Oklahoma Frontier (1939) credited as Roy Harris - Trooper
- The Flame of New Orleans credited as Roy Harris (1941)
- Mob Town (1941) credited as Roy Harris - Boy
- San Antonio Rose (1941) credited as Roy Harris - Jimmy
- Men of the Timberland (1941) credited as Roy Harris - Withers
- Flying Cadets (1941) credited as Roy Harris - Barnes
- Nice Girl? (1941) credited as Roy Harris - Doug
- Law of the Range (1941) credited as Roy Harris - Wolverine Kid
- Rawhide Rangers (1941) credited as Roy Harris - Steve Calhoun
- Meet the Chump (1941) credited as Roy Harris - Clerk
- Bombay Clipper (1942) credited as Roy Harris - Steward
- North to the Klondike (1942) credited as Roy Harris - Ben Sloan
- Top Sergeant (1942) credited as Roy Harris - Roy
- Texas Trouble Shooters (1942) credited as Roy Harris - Bret Travis
- Arizona Stage Coach (1942) credited as Roy Harris - Ernie
- Ghost Guns (1944) - Ted Connors
- What Next, Corporal Hargrove? (1945) - Private
- Flame of the West (1945) - Jack Midland
- Sheriff of Cimarron (1945) - Ted Cartwright
- Gun Smoke (1945) - Joel Hinkley
- The Navajo Trail (1945) - Paul
- The Lost Trail (1945) - Ned Turner
- The Desert Horseman (1946) - Eddie
- Border Bandits (1946) - Steve Halliday
- Under Arizona Skies (1946) - Bill Simpson
- The Haunted Mine (1946) - Dan McLeod
- Trigger Fingers (1946) - Jimmy Peters
- Flashing Guns (1947) - Fred Shelby
- Code of the Saddle (1947) - Bill Stace
- Jiggs and Maggie in Court (1948) - Dennis Malone
- Frontier Agent (1948) - Joe Farr
- Range Renegades (1948) - Larry Jordan
- The Rangers Ride (1948) - Vic Sanders
- Shadows of the West (1949) - Carl Davis
- Across the Rio Grande (1949) - Steven Blaine
- Range Justice (1949) - Glenn Hadley
- Western Renegades (1949) - Joe Gordon
- Law of the West (1949) - Charley Lane
- Lawless Code (1949) - Curly Blake
- Bride for Sale (1949) credited as Roy Harris - Clerk
- Gunslingers (1950) - Tim Cramer
- Radar Secret Service (1950) - Blacky
- Short Grass (1950) - Randee Fenton
- Silver Raiders (1950) - Bill
- Jiggs and Maggie Out West (1950) - Bob Carter
- Six Gun Mesa (1950) - Dave Emmett
- Law of the Panhandle (1950) - Tom Stocker
- Fence Riders (1950) - Hutch
- Valley of Fire (1951) - Colorado
- Canyon Raiders (1951) - Lou Banks
- Nevada Badmen (1951) - Jess
- Navy Bound (1951) - Officer
- The Vanishing Outpost (1951) - Walker
- I Was an American Spy (1951) - Thompson
- Outlaw Women (1952) - John Ringo
- The Raiders (1952) - Clarke Leftus
- Night Stage to Galveston (1952) - Police lieutenant
- Here Come the Marines (1952) - Captain Harlow
- The Lusty Men (1952) - Hoag
- Wagons West (1952) - Gaylord Cook
- Target (1952) - Foster
- Fort Vengeance (1953) - Montana deputy
- White Lightning (1953) - Horwin
- Buchanan Rides Alone (1958) - Juror
- The Threat (1960) - Police Sergeant
- Ma Barker's Killer Brood (1960) - Deputy
- The Trial of Billy Jack (1974) - Stuart Posner
- The Last Hard Men (1976) - Gus
- Wanda Nevada (1979) - Reporter #2
- When You Comin' Back, Red Ryder? (1979) - Junior Ferguson
