= Barney Sarecky =

American film producer, screenwriter

- Born: May 7, 1895; New York City, New York, United States
- Died: August 10, 1968 (aged 73); Los Angeles, California, United States
- Occupations: Producer, screenwriter
- Years active: 1937–1951

Barney Sarecky (May 7, 1895 – August 10, 1968) was an American film producer and screenwriter, from the late 1930s into the 1950s.

== Career ==
The younger brother of producer/screenwriter Louis Sarecky, he had a much more prolific career, writing or producing almost 75 films. Beginning as an associate producer, he would continue in that role until late in his career, when he would move up into the producer role, beginning with 1947's Trailing Danger.

In the early 1950s he moved from the big screen to the smaller screen, working as the associate producer on the highly successful television series, Adventures of Superman.

He worked on two small television movies in the mid-1960s, and he was an associate producer on the short-lived television series, The American West, in 1968, shortly before his death on August 10.

== Filmography ==
(Per AFI database)

- Trouble at Midnight (1937)
- Young Fugitives (1938)
- Mars Attacks the World (1938)
- The Missing Guest (1938)
- Strange Faces (1938)
- Pirates of the Skies (1939)
- The Deadly Game (1941)
- Double Trouble (1941)
- Black Dragons (1942)
- Bowery at Midnight (1942)
- The Corpse Vanishes (1942)
- Let's Get Tough! (1942)
- So's Your Aunt Emma (1942)
- Mr. Wise Guy (1942)
- 'Neath Brooklyn Bridge (1942)
- Smart Alecks (1942)
- Clancy Street Boys (1943)
- Ghosts on the Loose (1943)
- Kid Dynamite (1943)
- Mr. Muggs Steps Out (1943)
- Spotlight Scandals (1943)
- The Ape Man (1943)
- What a Man! (1944)
- Follow the Leader (1944)
- Million Dollar Kid (1944)
- Return of the Ape Man (1944)
- Three of a Kind (1944)
- Voodoo Man (1944)
- Block Busters (1944)
- Bowery Champs (1944)
- Crazy Knights (1944)
- Mom and Dad (1945)
- My Dog Shep (1946)
- 'Neath Canadian Skies (1946)
- North of the Border (1946)
- Code of the Saddle (1947)
- Flashing Guns (1947)
- Land of the Lawless (1947)
- The Law Comes to Gunsight (1947)
- Prairie Express (1947)
- Six-Gun Serenade (1947)
- Song of the Wasteland (1947)
- Trailing Danger (1947)
- Gun Talk (1947)
- Back Trail (1948)
- The Fighting Ranger (1948)
- Frontier Agent (1948)
- Overland Trails (1948)
- The Sheriff of Medicine Bow (1948)
- Triggerman (1948)
- Gunning for Justice (1948)
- Hidden Danger (1948)
- Crashing Thru (1949)
- Law of the West (1949)
- Range Justice (1949)
- Shadows of the West (1949)
- Trails End (1949)
- West of El Dorado (1949)
- Again Pioneers (1950)
- Motor Patrol (1950)
- Radar Secret Service (1950)
- Superman and the Mole-Men (1951)
- A Wonderful Life (1951) – associate producer
