= Triggerman (film) =

1948 film directed by Howard Bretherton

- Theatrical release poster
- Directed by: Howard Bretherton
- Written by: Ronald Davidson
- Produced by: Barney Sarecky
- Starring: Johnny Mack Brown; Raymond Hatton
- Cinematography: Harry Neumann
- Edited by: John C. Fuller
- Music by: Edward J. Kay
- Production company: Monogram Pictures
- Release date: June 28, 1948 (US)
- Running time: 56 minutes
- Country: United States
- Language: English

Triggerman is a 1948 American Western film written by Howard Bretherton, from a screenplay by Ronald Davidson. The film stars Johnny Mack Brown and Raymond Hatton.

== Cast ==
- Johnny Mack Brown as Johnny Mack Brown
- Raymond Hatton as Rusty Steel
- Virginia Carroll as Lois Benton
- Bill Kennedy as Kirby
- Marshall Reed as Moran
- Forrest Matthews as Harris
- Bob Woodward as Davis
- Dee Cooper as Joe
