= White Lightning (1953 film) =

Film by Edward Bernds

- Directed by: Edward Bernds
- Written by: Charles R. Marion
- Produced by: Ben Schwalb
- Cinematography: Lester White
- Production company: Monogram Pictures
- Release date: March 8, 1953
- Running time: 61 minutes
- Country: United States
- Language: English

White Lightning is a 1953 film directed by Edward Bernds and starring Stanley Clements, Barbara Bestar and Steve Brodie. The film also features a young Lee Van Cleef in an early role.

== Plot ==
The film centers around a professional ice hockey team called the Red Devils who are in the midst of an extended losing streak. The losing streak is due to the team's proprietor Jack Monohan (Steve Brodie) taking bribes from gamblers. The team receives fresh hope in the form of a new player, Mike Connors (Stanley Clements). Mike is an arrogant and self-assured man, who is also Jack's former childhood friend. His talent helps the team regain their formerly winning ways. However, the new star quickly becomes disliked for his egocentric attitude and playing style. Matters worsen when Jack's sister Margaret (Barbara Bestar) becomes attracted in Mike. This romantic interest leads to an out-and-out brawl between the two men. The fight is stopped after a local drifter named Brutus steps in but is stabbed by Mike. An angered Mike takes a bribe—to throw the extremely important final game—from a gambler named Rocky Gibraltar (Lyle Talbot). During the game, Mike sees sense with the help of a young, admiring fan named Davey (Duncan Richardson). He helps win the game.

== Cast ==
- Stanley Clements as Mike Connors
- Barbara Bestar as Margaret Monohan
- Steve Brodie as Jack Monohan
- Gloria Blondell as Ann Garfield
- Paul Bryar as Stew Barton
- Lyle Talbot as Rocky Gibraltar
- Frank Jenks as Benny Brown
- Lee Van Cleef as Brutus Allen
- Myron Healey as Nelson
- Riley Hill as Horwin
- Duncan Richardson as Davey
- Tom Hanlon as Announcer
- John Bleifer as Tailor
- Jane Easton as Girl
- Jon Andrew as Brutus the handicapped sailor

== See also ==
- List of films about ice hockey
