= Raymond Hatton =

American actor (1887–1971)

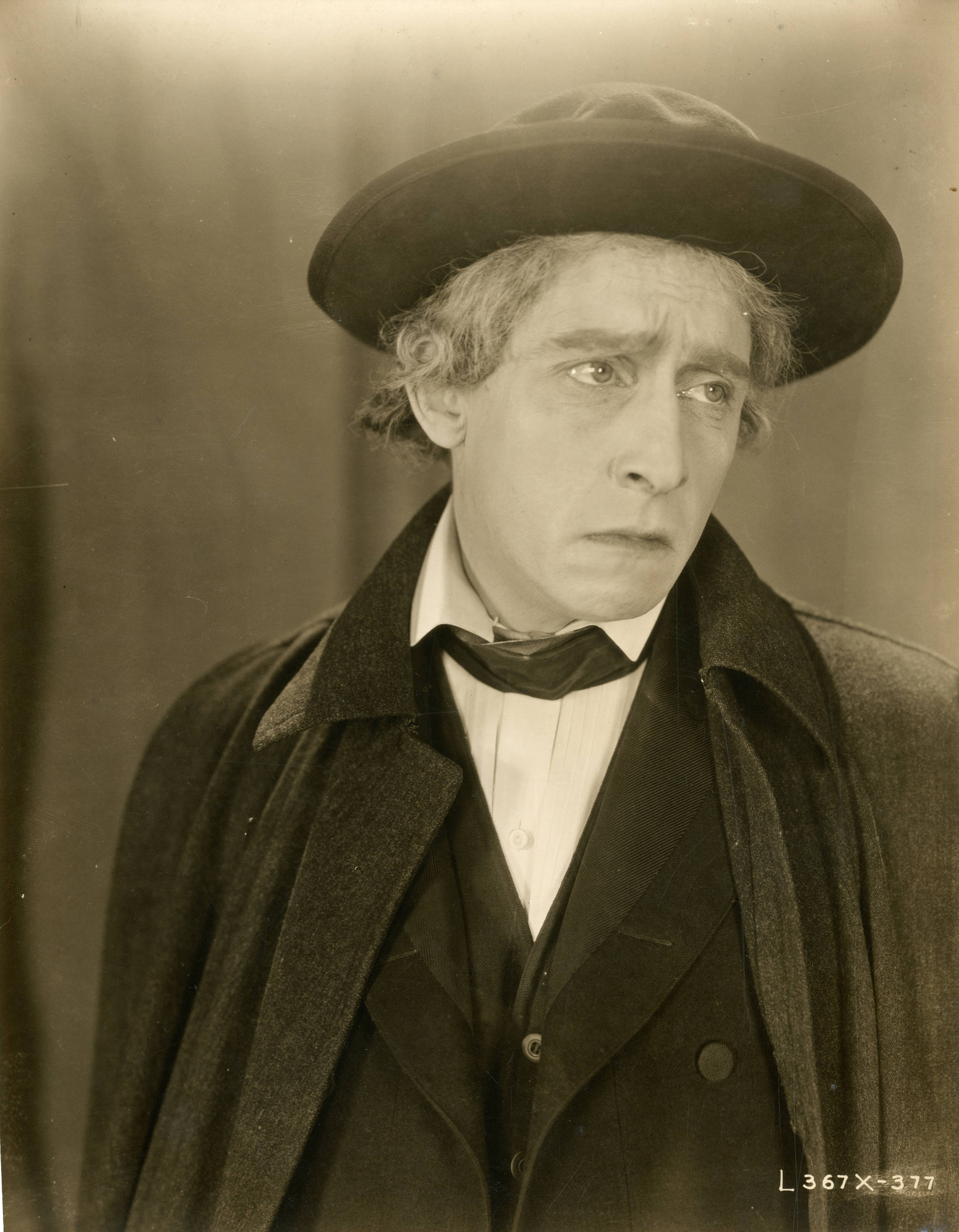
- Hatton in The Affairs of Anatol (1921)
- Born: Raymond William Hatton; July 7, 1887; Red Oak, Iowa, U.S.
- Died: October 21, 1971 (aged 84); Palmdale, California, U.S.
- Resting place: Joshua Memorial Park
- Occupation: Actor
- Years active: 1909–1967
- Spouse: Frances Hatton (m. 1909; died 1971)

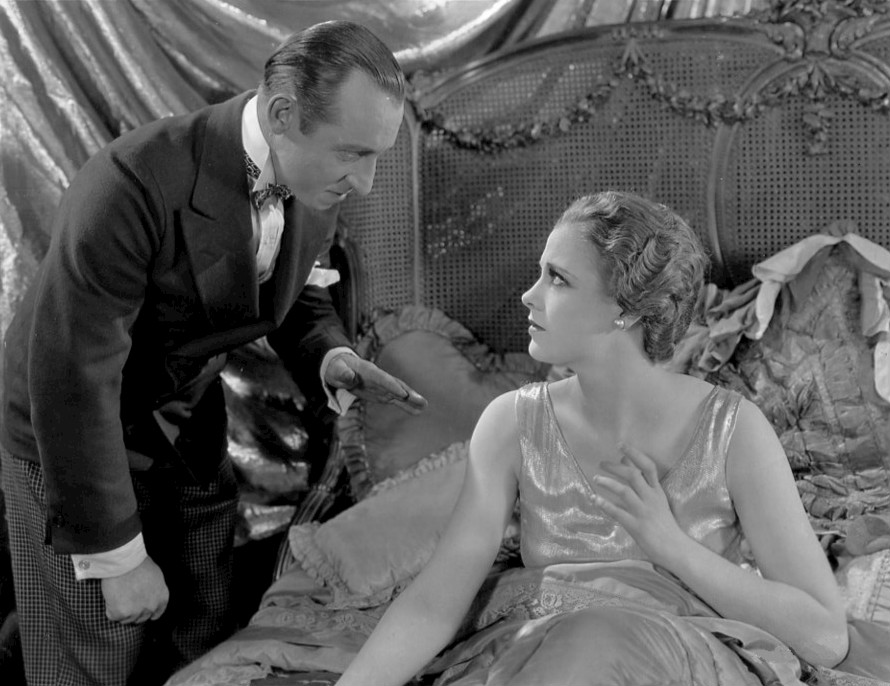
Hatton and Esther Ralston in the drama film Fashions for Women (1927)

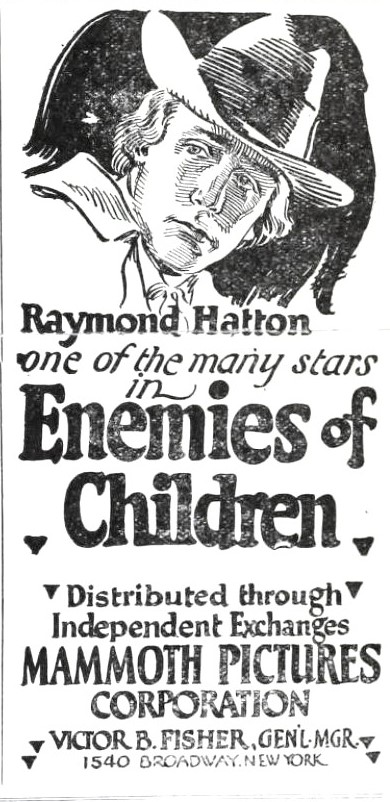
Hatton in Enemies of Children (1923)

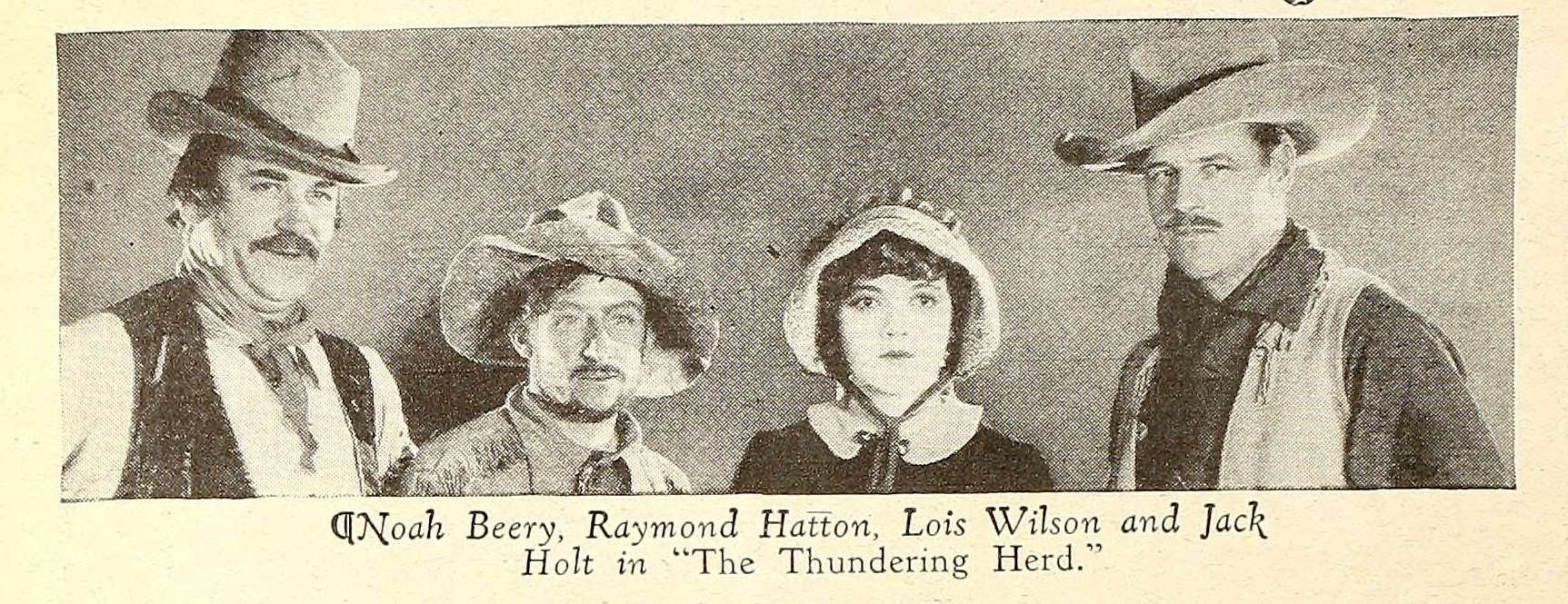
Noah Beery, Raymond Hatton, Lois Wilson, and Jack Holt in The Thundering Herd (1925)

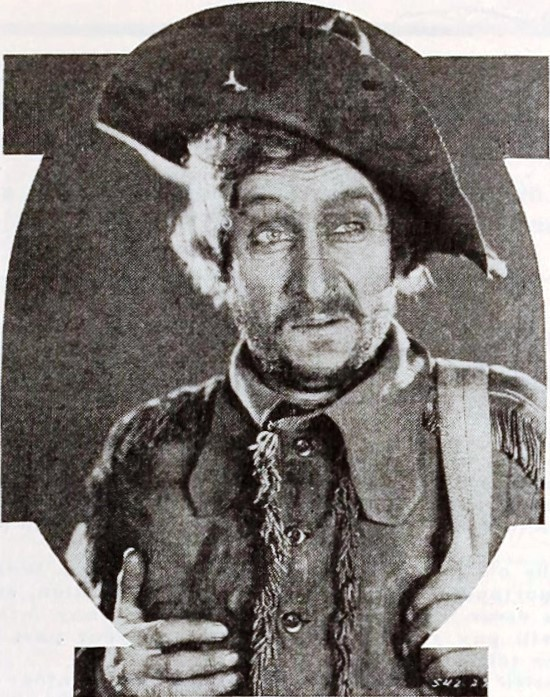
Hatton in The Thundering Herd (1925)

Raymond William Hatton (July 7, 1887 – October 21, 1971) was an American film actor who appeared in almost 500 motion pictures.

== Biography ==
Hatton was born in Red Oak, Iowa. His physician father steered him toward a career in medicine. However, Hatton had become enamored of being on stage after he acted in a school play, and he left home to go into acting as a career.

Hatton was part of a vaudeville act that went to Hollywood in 1911. There, he established a successful silent film career, including a stint being paired in 1920s comedies with Wallace Beery. During the sound era, though, his career soon skidded and he usually played smaller supporting roles, including the tobacco-chewing, rowdy character Rusty Joslin in The Three Mesquiteers Western B picture series. By the 1950s, Hatton's acting roles expanded into television, where he appeared in various series, including the Adventures of Superman.

He has a star in the Motion Picture section of the Hollywood Walk of Fame at 1708 Vine Street.

Hatton died of a heart attack, five days after his wife on October 21, 1971, in Palmdale, California, aged 84. He is interred at Joshua Memorial Park.

== Selected filmography ==
=== Film ===
- Tragic Love (1909, Short) – A Detective / In Factory
- A Burglar's Mistake (1909, Short) – At Folsom's / Secretary
- The Bangville Police (1913, Short) – Farm Hand (in vest)
- That Ragtime Band (1913, Short) – Trumpet Player
- The Squaw Man (1914) – Cowhand (uncredited)
- The Circus Man (1914) – Ernie Cronk
- The Girl of the Golden West (1915) – Castro
- Young Romance (1915) – Jack
- The Warrens of Virginia (1915) – Blake
- The Unafraid (1915, Short) – Bosnian Valet
- The Captive (1915) – Turkish Soldier (uncredited)
- The Woman (1915) – Secretary
- The Wild Goose Chase (1915, Short) – Mr. Wright
- The Arab (1915) – Mysterious Messenger
- Chimmie Fadden (1915, Short) – Larry, His Brother
- Kindling (1915) – Steve Bates
- The Case of Becky (1915) – Department Store Manager (uncredited)
- Blackbirds (1915) – Hawke, Jr.
- Carmen (1915) – Spectator at Bullfight (uncredited)
- Armstrong's Wife (1915) – Runner
- Chimmie Fadden Out West (1915) – Larry
- At Bay (1915) – Minor Role (uncredited)
- The Unknown (1915) – Second Private
- The Cheat (1915) – Courtroom Spectator (uncredited)
- The Immigrant (1915) – Munsing – Harding's Secretary
- The Golden Chance (1915) – Jimmy The Rat
- Temptation (1915) – Baron Cheurial
- Tennessee's Pardner (1916) – Gewilliker Hay
- To Have and to Hold (1916) – Nicolo
- The Sowers (1916) – The Peddler
- Public Opinion (1916) – Smith
- The Honorable Friend (1916) – Kayosho
- The Lash (1916) – Mr. Crawdon
- Oliver Twist (1916) – The Artful Dodger
- Joan the Woman (1916) – Charles VII
- The American Consul (1917) – President Cavillo
- A Romance of the Redwoods (1917) – Dick Roland
- The Little American (1917) – Count Jules de Destin
- What Money Can't Buy (1917) – King Stephen III
- The Squaw Man's Son (1917) – Storekeeper
- The Crystal Gazer (1917) – Phil Mannering
- Hashimura Togo (1917) – Reporter
- The Woman God Forgot (1917) – Montezuma
- The Secret Game (1917) – Mr. Harris
- Nan of Music Mountain (1917) – Logan
- The Devil-Stone (1917)
- Jules of the Strong Heart (1918) – Ted Kendall
- One More American (1918) – Bump Rundle
- The Whispering Chorus (1918) – John Tremble
- Old Wives for New (1918) – Beautician (uncredited)
- We Can't Have Everything (1918) – Marquis Of Strathdene
- The Firefly of France (1918) – The Firefly
- Sandy (1918) – Ricks Wilson
- Less Than Kin (1918) – James Emmons
- The Source (1918) – Pop Sprowl
- Arizona (1918) – Tony
- The Dub (1919) – Phineas Driggs
- Don't Change Your Husband (1919) – Phineas Driggs
- Maggie Pepper (1919) – Jake Rothschild
- The Poor Boob (1919) – Stephen Douglas
- Experimental Marriage (1919) – Arthur Barnard
- Johnny Get Your Gun (1919) – Milton C. Milton
- For Better, for Worse (1919) – Bud
- You're Fired (1919) – Orchestra Leader
- Secret Service (1919) – Lieutenant Howard Varney
- A Daughter of the Wolf (1919) – Doc
- The Love Burglar (1919) – Parson Smith
- Male and Female (1919) – Honorable Ernest Wolley
- Everywoman (1919) – Honorable Ernest Wolley
- Young Mrs. Winthrop (1920) – Nick Jones
- The Dancin' Fool (1920) – Enoch Jones
- The Sea Wolf (1920) – Thomas Mugridge, the Cook
- Jes' Call Me Jim (1920) – Paul Benedict
- Stop Thief! (1920) – James Cluney
- Officer 666 (1920) – Whitney Barnes
- Bunty Pulls the Strings (1921) – Weelum
- The Concert (1921) – Dr. Hart
- The Betrayer (1921)
- Peck's Bad Boy (1921) – The Village Grocer
- Salvage (1921) – The Cripple
- The Ace of Hearts (1921) – The Menace
- The Affairs of Anatol (1921) – Great Blatsky – Violin Teacher (uncredited)
- Pilgrims of the Night (1921) – Le Blun
- All's Fair in Love (1921) – Craigh Randolph
- Doubling for Romeo (1921) – Steve Woods / Paris
- Head over Heels (1922) – Pepper
- His Back Against the Wall (1922) – Jeremy Dice
- The Fast Freight (1922)
- Pink Gods (1922) – Jim Wingate
- Manslaughter (1922) – Brown
- To Have and to Hold (1922) – King James I
- Ebb Tide (1922) – J.L. Huish
- The Hottentot (1922) – Swift
- Java Head (1923) – Edward Dunsack
- The Tie That Binds (1923) – Hiram Foster
- Trimmed in Scarlet (1923) – Mr. Kipp
- A Man of Action (1923) – Harry Hopwood
- Three Wise Fools (1923) – Young Gaunt
- The Barefoot Boy (1923) – Deacon Holloway
- The Hunchback of Notre Dame (1923) (with Lon Chaney) – Gringoire
- The Virginian (1923) – Shorty
- Enemies of Children (1923)
- Big Brother (1923) – Cokey Joe Miller
- Half-A-Dollar-Bill (1924) – Noodles – the Cook
- True as Steel (1924) – Great Grandfather
- Triumph (1924) – A Tramp
- The Fighting Adventurer (1924) – Denny Daynes and Po-Hsing-Chien
- Cornered (1924) – Nick – the Dope
- The Mine with the Iron Door (1924) – The Lizard
- Tomorrow's Love (1925) – Brown
- Adventure (1925) – Raff
- The Devil's Cargo (1925) – Mate
- The Top of the World (1925) – Capt. Preston
- Contraband (1925) – Launcelot Bangs
- The Thundering Herd (1925; with Noah Beery) – Jude Pilchuk
- In the Name of Love (1925) – Marquis de Beausant
- A Son of His Father (1925) – Charlie Grey
- Lord Jim (1925) – Cornelius
- Behind the Front (1926) (with Wallace Beery) – Shorty McKee
- Silence (1926) – Harry Silvers
- Born to the West (1926) – Jim Fallon
- Forlorn River (1926) – Arizona Pete
- We're in the Navy Now (1926) – 'Stinky' Smith
- Fashions for Women (1927) – Sam Dupont
- Fireman, Save My Child (1927; with Wallace Beery) – Sam
- Now We're in the Air (1927; with Wallace Beery and Louise Brooks) – Ray
- Two Flaming Youths (1927) – Himself – as Beery and Hatton (uncredited)
- Wife Savers (1928) – Rodney Ramsbottom
- Partners in Crime (1928) – 'Scoop' McGee, The Reporter
- The Big Killing (1928) – Deadeye Dan
- The Office Scandal (1929) – Pearson, the City Editor
- Trent's Last Case (1929) – Joshua Cupples
- The Mighty (1929) – Dogey Franks
- Hell's Heroes (1929) – 'Barbwire' Tom Gibbons
- Murder on the Roof (1930) – Drinkwater
- Midnight Mystery (1930) – Paul Cooper
- Road to Paradise (1930) – Nick
- The Silver Horde (1930) – Fraser
- Rogue of the Rio Grande (1930) – Pedro
- Pineapples (1930)
- The Lion and the Lamb (1931) – Muggsy
- Woman Hungry (1931) – Joac
- Honeymoon Lane (1931) – Dynamite
- The Squaw Man (1931) – Shorty
- Arrowsmith (1931) – Drunk (uncredited)
- Stung (1931) – Dumb Juryman
- Polly of the Circus (1932) – Downey
- Law and Order (1932) – Deadwood
- Stranger in Town (1932) – Elmer
- Alias Mary Smith (1932) – Scoop
- The Vanishing Frontier (1932) – Hornet O'Lowery
- Cornered (1932) – Deputy Jacklin
- Drifting Souls (1932) – Scoop
- The Crooked Circle (1932) – Harmon (The Hermit)
- The Fourth Horseman (1932) – Gabby – Tax Clerk
- Exposed (1932) – Marty
- Vanity Street (1932) – Shorty
- Hidden Gold (1932) – Spike Webber
- Malay Nights (1932) – Rance Danvers
- Uptown New York (1932) – Slot Machine King
- Long Loop Laramie (1932)
- Terror Trail (1933) – Lucky Dawson
- State Trooper (1933) – Carter
- The Thundering Herd (1933) – Jude Pilchuck
- Under the Tonto Rim (1933) – Porky
- The Three Musketeers (1933, Serial) (with John Wayne) – Renard
- The Big Cage (1933) – Timothy O'Hara
- Penthouse (1933) – Bodyguard
- Day of Reckoning (1933) – Hart
- The Women in His Life (1933) – Curly
- Lady Killer (1933) – Pete
- Alice in Wonderland (1933) – Mouse
- Lazy River (1934) – Capt. Herbert Orkney
- The Defense Rests (1934) – Louie
- Fifteen Wives (1934) – Det. Sgt. Meade
- Straight Is the Way (1934) – Mendel
- Once to Every Bachelor (1934) – Uncle John
- Peck's Bad Boy (1934) – Minor Role (uncredited)
- Wagon Wheels (1934) – Jim Burch
- Red Morning (1934) – Hawker
- Rustlers of Red Dog (1935, Serial) – Laramie
- Times Square Lady (1935) – 'Slim' Kennedy
- Princess O'Hara (1935) – Frying Pan (uncredited)
- G Men (1935) – Gangsters' Messenger with Warning
- Murder in the Fleet (1935) – Al Duval (uncredited)
- Calm Yourself (1935) – Mike
- The Daring Young Man (1935) – Flaherty
- Steamboat Round the Bend (1935) – Matt Abel
- Wanderer of the Wasteland (1935) – Merryvale
- Stormy (1935) – Stuffy
- Nevada (1935) – Sheriff
- Exclusive Story (1936) – City Editor
- Timothy's Quest (1936) – Jabe Doolittle
- Laughing Irish Eyes (1936) – Gallagher
- Desert Gold (1936) – Doc Belding
- Undersea Kingdom (1936) – Gasspon
- Fury (1936) – Hector – Barber (uncredited)
- The Arizona Raiders (1936) – Tracks Williams
- Women Are Trouble (1936) – Joe Murty
- The Vigilantes Are Coming (1936, Serial) – Whipsaw
- Yellowstone (1936) – Old Pete
- Mad Holiday (1936) – 'Cokey Joe' Ferris
- Sinner Take All (1936) – Hotel Clerk
- Jungle Jim (1937, Serial) – Malay Mike
- Marked Woman (1937) – Vanning's Lawyer
- Fly-Away Baby (1937) – Maxie Monkhouse
- Roaring Timber (1937) – 'Tennessee'
- Public Wedding (1937) – The Deacon
- Love Is on the Air (1937) – Weston
- Over the Goal (1937) – Deputy Abner
- The Adventurous Blonde (1937) – Maxie
- Missing Witnesses (1937) – 'Little Joe' Macey
- The Bad Man of Brimstone (1937; with Wallace Beery) – Cal Turner (uncredited)
- He Couldn't Say No (1938) – Hymie Atlas, a Gangster
- Over the Wall (1938) – Convict
- Love Finds Andy Hardy (1938) – Peter Dugan
- The Texans (1938) – Cal Tuttle
- Touchdown, Army (1938) – Bob Haskins
- Come On, Rangers (1938) – Jeff
- Tom Sawyer, Detective (1938) – Judge Tyler
- Ambush (1939) – Mosher – Hardware Storekeeper (uncredited)
- Paris Honeymoon (1939) – Huskins
- Persons in Hiding (1939) – Hadley (uncredited)
- Rough Riders' Round-up (1939) – Rusty Coburn
- I'm from Missouri (1939) – Darryl Coffee, Mule Breeder
- Frontier Pony Express (1939) – Horseshoe
- Undercover Doctor (1939) – Dizzy Warner
- 6,000 Enemies (1939) – 'Wibbie' Yern
- Wyoming Outlaw (1939) (with John Wayne) – Rusty Joslin
- Career (1939) – Deacon
- Wall Street Cowboy (1939) – Chuckawalla
- New Frontier (1939) (with John Wayne) – Rusty Joslin
- The Kansas Terrors (1939) – Rusty Joslin
- Cowboys from Texas (1939) – Rusty Joslin
- Heroes of the Saddle (1940) – Rusty Joslin
- Pioneers of the West (1940) – Rusty Joslin
- Hi-Yo Silver (1940) – Smokey (uncredited)
- Covered Wagon Days (1940) – Rusty Joslin
- Rocky Mountain Rangers (1940) – Rusty Joslin
- Queen of the Mob (1940) – Herb – Auto Camp Proprietor
- Kit Carson (1940) – Jim Bridger
- Oklahoma Renegades (1940) – Rusty
- White Eagle (1941, Serial) – Grizzly
- Arizona Bound (1941) – Marshal Sandy Hopkins
- Forbidden Trails (1941) – Sandy Hopkins
- Texas (1941) – Abilene Judge (uncredited)
- Forbidden Trails (1941) – Marshal Sandy Hopkins aka Killer
- Cadets on Parade (1942) – Gus Novak
- Below the Border (1942) – Marshal Sandy – aka Killer
- Reap the Wild Wind (1942) – Master Shipwright
- Ghost Town Law (1942) – Marshal Sandy Hopkins – aka Killer
- The Girl from Alaska (1942) – Shorty
- Down Texas Way (1942) – U.S. Marshal Sandy Hopkins
- The Affairs of Martha (1942) – Patrolling Beach Cleaner (uncredited)
- Her Cardboard Lover (1942) – George the Bailiff (uncredited)
- Pierre of the Plains (1942) – Pete (uncredited)
- Riders of the West (1942) – Marshal Sandy Hopkins
- West of the Law (1942) – Marshal Sandy Hopkins
- Dawn on the Great Divide (1942) – Marshal Sandy Hopkins
- Prairie Chickens (1943) – Jefferson Gilbert
- The Ghost Rider (1943) – Marshal Sandy Hopkins
- The Stranger from Pecos (1943) – Marshal Sandy Hopkins
- Six Gun Gospel (1943) – Marshal Sandy Hopkins
- Outlaws of Stampede Pass (1943) – Marshal Sandy Hopkins
- The Texas Kid (1943) – Marshal Sandy Hopkins
- Raiders of the Border (1944) – Marshal Sandy Hopkins
- Partners of the Trail (1944) – Marshal Sandy Hopkins
- Law Men (1944) – Marshal Sandy Hopkins
- Range Law (1944) – Marshal Sandy Hopkins
- West of the Rio Grande (1944) – Marshal Sandy Hopkins
- Land of the Outlaws (1944) – Marshal Sandy Hopkins
- Tall in the Saddle (1944) (With John Wayne) – Zeke
- Law of the Valley (1944) – Marshal Sandy Hopkins
- Ghost Guns (1944) – Marshal Sandy Hopkins
- The Navajo Trail (1945) – Marshal Sandy Hopkins
- Gun Smoke (1945) – Marshal Sandy Hopkins
- Stranger from Santa Fe (1945) – Marshal Sandy Hopkins
- Flame of the West (1945) – Add Youman
- Rhythm Round-Up (1945) – Noah Jones
- Sunbonnet Sue (1945) – Joe Feeney
- The Lost Trail (1945) – Marshal Sandy Hopkins posing as Trigger
- Northwest Trail (1945) – Morgan – Bartender
- Frontier Feud (1945) – Marshal Sandy Hopkins
- Border Bandits (1946) – Marshal Sandy Hopkins
- Drifting Along (1946) – Pawnee Jones
- The Haunted Mine (1946) – Marshal Sandy Hopkins
- Under Arizona Skies (1946) – Santa Fe Jones
- The Gentleman from Texas (1946) – Idaho Foster
- Trigger Fingers (1946) – Pinto Peters
- Shadows on the Range (1946) – Dusty Cripps
- Rolling Home (1946) – Pop Miller
- Silver Range (1946) – Tucson Smith
- Raiders of the South (1947) – Shorty Kendall
- Valley of Fear (1947) – 'Rusty' Peters
- Trailing Danger (1947) – Waco
- Land of the Lawless (1947) – Bodie
- The Law Comes to Gunsight (1947) – Reno
- Code of the Saddle (1947) – Winks
- Flashing Guns (1947) – Amos Shelby
- Black Gold (1947) – Bucky
- Unconquered (1947) – Venango Scout
- Prairie Express (1947) – Faro Jenkins
- Gun Talk (1947) – Lucky Danvers
- Overland Trails (1948) – Dusty Hanover
- Crossed Trails (1948) – Bodie Clark
- Frontier Agent (1948) – Cappy
- Triggerman (1948) – Rusty Steele
- Back Trail (1948) – Casoose
- The Fighting Film (1948) – Banty
- The Sheriff of Medicine Bow (1948) – Banty Prentiss
- Gunning for Justice (1948) – Banty
- Hidden Danger (1948) – Juniper
- The Daltons' Women (1950) – Sheriff Doolin
- Hostile Country (1950) – Colonel Patrict
- Marshal of Heldorado (1950) – Colonel
- Operation Haylift (1950) – Sandy Cameron
- Crooked River (1950) – Colonel
- Colorado Ranger (1950) – The Colonel
- West of the Brazos (1950) – The Colonel
- Fast on the Draw (1950) – Colonel
- County Fair (1950) – Sad Sam
- Skipalong Rosenbloom (1951) – Granpappy Tex Rosenbloom
- Kentucky Jubilee (1951) – Ben White
- The Golden Hawk (1952) – Barnaby Stoll
- Cow Country (1953) – Smokey
- Thunder Pass (1954) – Ancient
- Treasure of Ruby Hills (1955) – Westbrook 'Scotty' Scott
- The Twinkle in God's Eye (1955) – Yahoo Man
- Dig That Uranium (1955) – Hank 'Mac' McKenzie
- Day the World Ended (1955) – Pete
- Girls in Prison (1956) – Pop Carson
- Flesh and the Spur (1956) – Windy Wagonwheels
- Shake, Rattle & Rock! (1956) – Horace Fitzdingle
- Invasion of the Saucer Men (1957) – Farmer Larkin
- Pawnee (1957) – Obie Dilks
- Motorcycle Gang (1957) – Uncle Ed
- Alaska Passage (1959) – Prospector Hank
- The Quick Gun (1964) – Elderly Man
- Requiem for a Gunfighter (1965) – Hoops
- In Cold Blood (1967) – Elderly Hitchhiker

=== Television ===
- The Cisco Kid – episode – Medicine Flats – Sheriff (1950)
- The Cisco Kid – episode – Rustling – Sheriff (1950)
- Dick Tracy – episodes – The Mole: Parts 1–3 & The Payroll Robbery – The Mole (1950)
- Adventures of Wild Bill Hickok – episode – The Slocum Family – Pa Slocum (1951)
- Adventures of Wild Bill Hickok – episode – Indian Bureau Story – Seth Rossen (1951)
- The Cisco Kid – episode – Canyon City Kid – Gramps (1952)
- The Cisco Kid – episode – The Puppeteer – Uncle Gitano (1952)
- Adventures of Wild Bill Hickok – episode – Jingles Becomes a Baby Sitter – Webley (1952)
- The Abbott and Costello Show – episode – The Music Lover – Mr. Brooke (1953)
- The Cisco Kid – episode – Three Suspects – Morgan (1954)
- The Cisco Kid – episode – Mining Madness – Jeff Hanby (1954)
- Adventures of Wild Bill Hickok – episode – Ol' Pardner Rides Again – Josh Ledbetter (1954)
- Adventures of Superman – episode – The Bully of Dry Gulch – Sagebrush (1955)
- Adventures of Wild Bill Hickok – episode – The Golden Rainbow – Moses Martin (1955)
- Adventures of Wild Bill Hickok – episode – Old Cowboys Never Die – Herman (1955)
- Adventures of Superman – episode – Dagger Island – Jonathan Crag / Craymore (1956)
- Adventures of Wild Bill Hickok – episode – Jingles Gets the Bird – Cap'n Ben (1956)
- Adventures of Superman – episode – The Prince Albert Coat – Grandfather Jackson (1957)
- Leave it to Beaver – episode – The Clubhouse – Charlie the Fireman (1957)
- The Rough Riders – episode – The Counterfeiters – Osgood (1958)
- Death Valley Days – episode – Auto Intoxication (1958)
- Maverick – episode – Burial Ground of the Gods – Stableman (1958)
- Cheyenne – episode – The Gamble – Mousey (1958)
- Tombstone Territory – episode – Gun Hostage – Esau Stellings (1959)
- Bat Masterson – episode – A Personal Matter – Adam Fairbanks (Gunsmith) (1959)
- Maverick – episode – Royal Four Flush – Harry (1959)
- The Red Skelton Hour – episode – San Fernando in Alaska – Buck (1959)
- The Donna Reed Show – episode – The Broken Spirit – Mr. Barnhill (1960)
- Wanted: Dead or Alive – episode – A House Divided – Stableman (1960) (uncredited)
- Have Gun – Will Travel – episode – The Trial – Perce Weber (Bounty Hunter) (1960)
- Have Gun – Will Travel – episode – Full Circle – Eph Trager (1960)
- Maverick – episode – The Marquessa – Charlie Plank (1960; with Jack Kelly)
- Shotgun Slade – episode – Street of Terror – Tanner (1960)
- Gunsmoke – episode – Moo Moo Raid – Onie (1960)
- Have Gun – Will Travel – episode – The Tax Gatherer – Mayor Trevor (1961)
- Whispering Smith – episode – Three for One – Locksmith (1961)

=== Lobby card ===
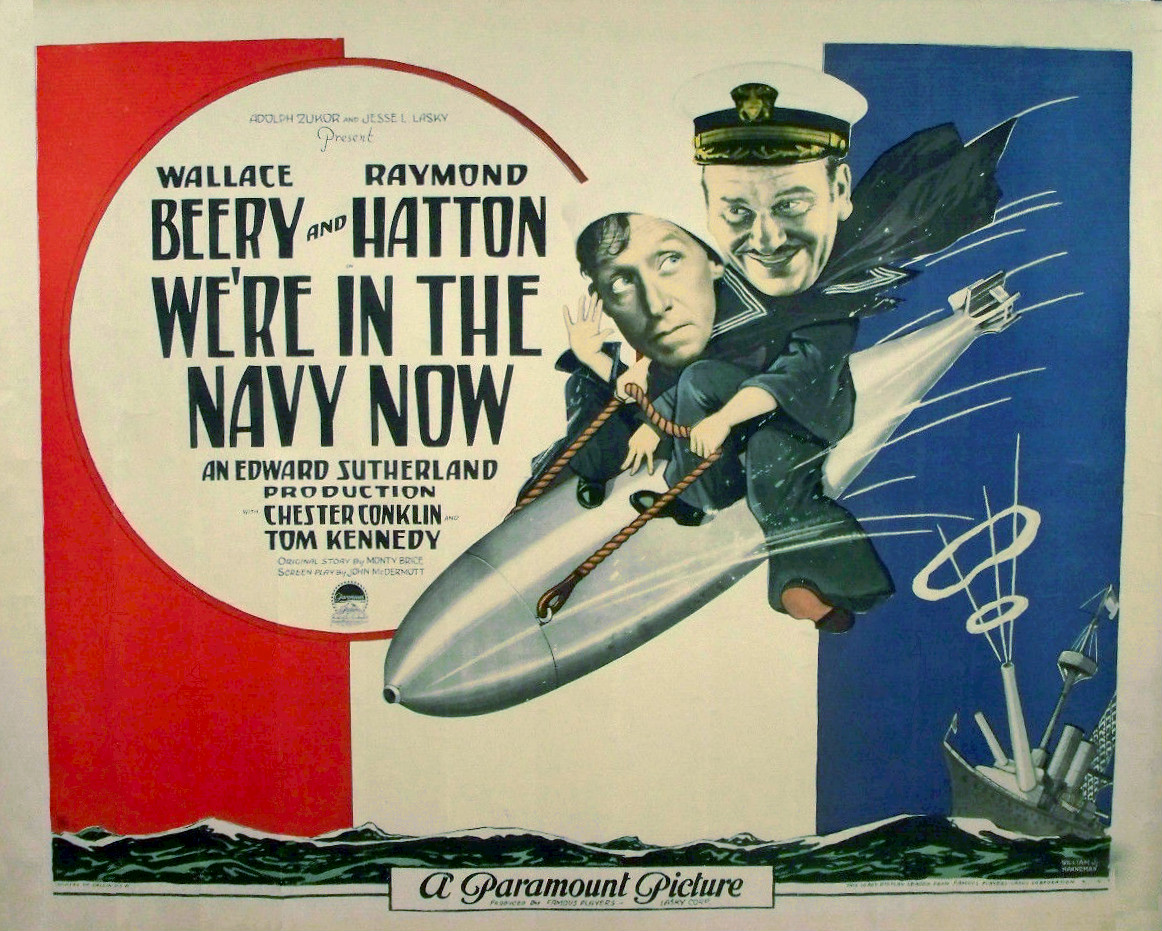
"Beery and Hatton" lobby card
