= Scott R. Dunlap =

American film producer

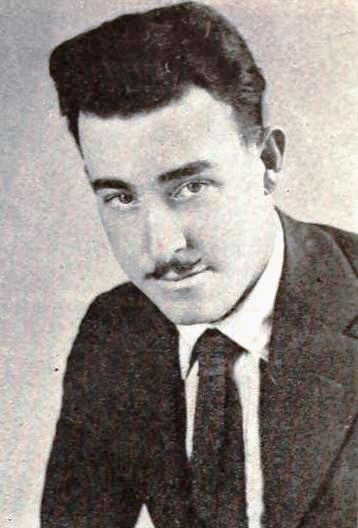
- Scott Dunlap in 1920
- Born: June 20, 1892; Chicago, Illinois, US
- Died: March 30, 1970 (aged 77); Los Angeles, US
- Years active: 1915–1960

Scott R. Dunlap (June 20, 1892 – March 30, 1970) was an American film producer, director, screenwriter, and actor.

== Career ==
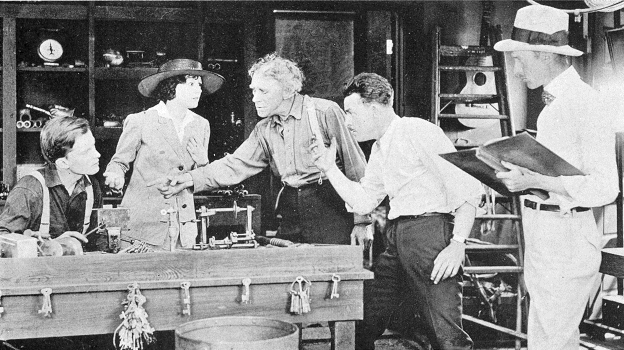
Dunlap directing

Dunlap was born in Chicago, Illinois in 1892 and entered the film business in 1915. He produced 70 films between 1937 and 1960, and directed 47 films between 1919 and 1929. In 1937 he joined Monogram Pictures, where he produced mostly action fare for the next two decades.

In 1941 Dunlap was the business partner and manager of cowboy star Buck Jones. Together they produced the Rough Riders western features for Monogram. Jones and Dunlap were present at the Cocoanut Grove fire in Boston, Massachusetts on November 28, 1942. Some news reports erroneously stated that Jones had escaped the flames, but had gone back into the nightclub to rescue others. It was really Dunlap, Jones's dinner companion, who was taken out of the building and treated for his injuries. Jones was still trapped inside the nightclub. He lingered for two days and then succumbed to his injuries on November 30, at age 50. The story of Jones's heroism was likely reported to the press by Jones's spokesman Dunlap, for publicity value.

Dunlap remained with Monogram as a producer of westerns, and continued with Monogram's successor Allied Artists through 1960. Dunlap died in Los Angeles in 1970.

== Selected filmography ==
- Vagabond Luck (1919) director
- Her Elephant Man (1920) director
- The Hell Ship (1920) director
- The Iron Rider (1920) director
- Twins of Suffering Creek (1920) director
- The Cheater Reformed (1921) director
- Bells of San Juan (1922)
- West of Chicago (1922) director
- Pawn Ticket 210 (1922) director
- Trooper O'Neill (1922) director
- The Footlight Ranger (1923) director
- Skid Proof (1923) director
- Snowdrift (1923) director
- Traffic in Hearts (1924)
- One Glorious Night (1924)
- The Fatal Mistake (1924) director
- Beyond the Border (1925) director
- Silent Sanderson (1925) director
- The Texas Trail (1925) director
- The Fearless Lover (1925) director
- Wreckage (1925) director
- Blue Blood (1925) director
- Driftin' Thru (1926) director
- Doubling with Danger (1926) director
- The Seventh Bandit (1926) director
- The Frontier Trail (1926) director
- Desert Valley (1926)
- Winning the Futurity (1926)
- The Better Man (1926) director
- Whispering Sage (1927) director
- Midnight Life (1928)
- Object: Alimony (1928) director
- Smoke Bellew (1929) director
- Luck of Roaring Camp (1937)
- The Marines Are Here (1938)
- Gun Packer (1938)
- The Mystery of Mr. Wong (1939)
- Streets of New York (1939)
- The Fatal Hour (1940)
- Doomed to Die (1940)
- The Old Swimmin' Hole (1940)
- Arizona Bound (1941)
- Road to Happiness (1942)
- Dawn on the Great Divide (1942)
- Flame of the West (1945)
- Border Bandits (1946)
- Drifting Along (1946)
- Trigger Fingers (1946)
- The Hunted (1948)
- Stampede (1949)
- Return from the Sea (1954)
- The Plunderers (1960)
