= Harry Neumann =

American cinematographer (1891–1971)

- Born: February 11, 1891; Chicago, Illinois, U.S.
- Died: February 14, 1971 (aged 80); Hollywood, Los Angeles, California, U.S.
- Other names: Harry Neuman; Harry Newman; Harry Newmann
- Occupation: Cinematographer
- Years active: 1918–1959

Harry C. Neumann (sometimes billed as Harry Neuman, Harry Newman, or Harry Newmann; February 11, 1891 – January 14, 1971) of Chicago, Illinois, was a Hollywood cinematographer whose career spanned over forty years, including work on some 350 productions in a wide variety of genres, with much of his work being in Westerns (including several John Wayne films), and gangster films.

He began working as a cinematographer or director of photography in 1918, the Golden Age of the silent film era; his last film was the 1959 science fiction-horror film, The Wasp Woman. Over the course of his career, he also worked on early attempts at a 3-D film, including William Cameron Menzies' last film, The Maze. Neumann also did cinematography for episodes of TV series, including The Court of Last Resort, The Adventures of Champion, and Death Valley Days.

Neumann died on January 14, 1971, in Hollywood, California.

== Partial filmography ==
- A Hoosier Romance (1918)
- The Yellow Dog (1918)
- The Still Alarm (1918)
- Bulldog Courage (1922)
- Ridgeway of Montana (1924)
- Fighting Fury (1924)
- The Back Trail (1924)
- The Calgary Stampede (1925)
- The Red Rider (1925)
- Ridin' Thunder (1925)
- Flying Hoofs (1925)
- The Arizona Sweepstakes (1926)
- Chip of the Flying U (1926)
- The Phantom Bullet (1926)
- Western Pluck (1926)
- The Buckaroo Kid (1926)
- The Denver Dude (1927)
- Hey! Hey! Cowboy (1927)
- Painted Ponies (1927)
- A Trick of Hearts (1928)
- The Wild West Show (1928)
- Burning the Wind (1929)
- King of the Rodeo (1929)
- Smilin' Guns (1929)
- False Fathers (1929)
- The Mounted Stranger (1930)
- Beyond the Law (1930)
- Cavalier of the West (1931)
- Hard Hombre (1931)
- Cowboy Counsellor (1932)
- The Girl from Calgary (1932)
- The Local Bad Man (1932)
- Guilty or Not Guilty (1932)
- The Stoker (1932)
- The Thirteenth Guest (1932)
- Unholy Love (1932)
- Vanity Fair (1932)
- The Gay Buckaroo (1932)
- A Man's Land (1932)
- The Iron Master (1933)
- A Shriek in the Night (1933)
- Tarzan the Fearless (1933)
- The Dude Bandit (1933)
- The Fighting Parson (1933)
- The Wolf Dog (1933)
- Picture Brides (1934)
- Once to Every Bachelor (1934)
- Take the Stand (1934)
- Million Dollar Baby (1934)
- Frisco Waterfront (1935)
- Keeper of the Bees (1935)
- The Healer (1935)
- The Hoosier Schoolmaster (1935)
- The Mysterious Mr. Wong (1935)
- The Mystery Man (1935)
- The New Frontier (1935)
- The Nut Farm (1935)
- The Old Homestead (1935)
- Two Sinners (1935)
- Hats Off (1936)
- Let's Sing Again (1936)
- California Straight Ahead! (1937)
- It Happened Out West (1937)
- I Cover the War (1937)
- Idol of the Crowds (1937)
- Roll Along, Cowboy (1937)
- Air Devils (1938)
- Gangster's Boy (1938)
- Mr. Wong, Detective (1938)
- Prison Break (1938)
- Boys' Reformatory (1939)
- Heroes in Blue (1939)
- Irish Luck (1939)
- Mr. Wong in Chinatown (1939)
- Mutiny in the Big House (1939)
- The Mystery of Mr. Wong (1939)
- The Phantom Stage (1939)
- The Streets of New York (1939)
- Chasing Trouble (1940)
- Doomed to Die (1940)
- Queen of the Yukon (1940)
- Son of the Navy (1940)
- The Ape (1940)
- The Fatal Hour (1940)
- The Last Alarm (1940)
- Hidden Enemy (1940)
- The Old Swimmin' Hole (1940)
- Arizona Bound (1941)
- Forced Landing (1941)
- I Killed That Man (1941)
- No Greater Sin (1941)
- Roar of the Press (1941)
- The Apache Kid (1941)
- Uncle Joe (1941)
- Under Fiesta Stars (1941)
- Dawn on the Great Divide (1942)
- Heart of the Rio Grande (1942)
- Man with Two Lives (1942)
- Road to Happiness (1942)
- South of Santa Fe (1942)
- A Gentle Gangster (1943)
- Are These Our Parents? (1944)
- Law Men (1944)
- Marked Trails (1944)
- Raiders of Ghost City (1944)
- The Great Alaskan Mystery (1944)
- The Utah Kid (1944)
- Allotment Wives (1945)
- Black Market Babies (1945)
- Captain Tugboat Annie (1945)
- The Cisco Kid Returns (1945)
- Divorce (1945)
- Fashion Model (1945)
- G. I. Honeymoon (1945)
- Flame of the West (1945)
- The Jade Mask (1945)
- Sunbonnet Sue (1945)
- Spook Busters (1946)
- Trigger Fingers (1946)
- Swing Parade of 1946 (1946)
- The Gay Cavalier (1946)
- Wife Wanted (1946)
- Cowboy Cavalier (1948)
- Panhandle (1948)
- The Hunted (1948)
- Silver Trails (1948)
- Back Trail (1948)
- Hidden Danger (1948)
- Triggerman (1948)
- Trails End (1949)
- Across the Rio Grande (1949)
- Stampede (1949)
- Two Lost Worlds (1950)
- Gunslingers (1950)
- West of Wyoming (1950)
- Flight to Mars (1951)
- I Was An American Spy (1951)
- The Highwayman (1951)
- Flat Top (1952)
- Hiawatha (1952)
- Rodeo (1952)
- Outlaw Women (1952)
- Wild Stallion (1952)
- The Rose Bowl Story (1952)
- Wagons West (1952)
- Clipped Wings (1953)
- Fighter Attack (1953)
- Jalopy (1953)
- Kansas Pacific (1953)
- Loose in London (1953)
- Roar of the Crowd (1953)
- The Maze (1953)
- Dragonfly Squadron (1954)
- Jungle Gents (1954)
- Paris Playboys (1954)
- Pride of the Blue Grass (1954)
- The Bowery Boys Meet the Monsters (1954)
- A Bullet for Joey (1955)
- Bowery to Bagdad (1955)
- Dig That Uranium (1955)
- High Society (1955)
- Spy Chasers (1955)
- The Phenix City Story (1955)
- Calling Homicide (1956)
- Crashing Las Vegas (1956)
- Fighting Trouble (1956)
- Hot Shots (1956)
- The Women of Pitcairn Island (1956)
- Screaming Eagles (1956)
- Hold That Hypnotist (1957)
- Looking for Danger (1957)
- Sabu and the Magic Ring (1957)
- My Gun Is Quick (1957)
- Spook Chasers (1957)
- Up in Smoke (1957)
- In the Money (1958)
- The Wasp Woman (1959)
