= Sidney Algier =

American actor (1889–1945)

- Born: December 5, 1889
- Died: April 24, 1945 (aged 55)

Sidney H. Algier (December 5, 1889 – April 24, 1945) was an American actor, film director and screenwriter. He was married to Wava Roberts.

== Early life ==
Born in Shamokin, Pennsylvania, Algier was the son of Elise and Allan Algier.

== Personal life and career ==
In March 1918, Algier married Wava Rae Foster in Santa Barbara, California.

On April 24, 1945, in Sawtelle, Los Angeles, Algier suffered a fatal heart attack at the age of 55. He was survived by his wife.

== Filmography ==
=== Assistant director ===
- Reclamation (1916)
- The Inner Struggle (1916) (as Sidney H. Algier)
- Dust (1916) (as Sidney H. Algier)
- The Twinkler (1916) (as Sidney H. Algier)
- Some Liar (1919) (as Sidney H. Algier)
- A Sporting Chance (1919/I) (as Sidney H. Algier)
- Six Feet Four (1919) (as Sidney H. Algier)
- The Week-End (1920) ... a.k.a. The Weekend (USA)
- Their Mutual Child (1920)
- The Thirtieth Piece of Silver (1920)
- The House of Toys (1920)
- The Blue Moon (1920) (as Sidney H. Algier)
- The Gamesters (1920) (as Sidney H. Algier)
- The Dangerous Age (1923)
- Why Men Leave Home (1924)
- Husbands and Lovers (1924)
- Fine Clothes (1925)
- Memory Lane (1926)
- The Gay Deceiver (1926)
- Lovers? (1927)

=== Unit manager ===
- Wallaby Jim of the Islands (1937) (as Sid Algiers)

=== Production manager ===
- The Hard Hombre (1931)
- The Local Bad Man (1932)
- The Gay Buckaroo (1932)
- Spirit of the West (1932)
- A Man's Land (1932)
- The Boiling Point (1932)
- The Thirteenth Guest (1932) ... a.k.a. Lady Beware
- A Parisian Romance (1932)
- Cowboy Counsellor (1932)
- The Intruder (1933)
- The Eleventh Commandment (1933)
- The Dude Bandit (1933)
- A Shriek in the Night (1933)

=== Actor ===
- Spider Barlow's Soft Spot (1915) (as Sid Algier) .... Spike
- Under Azure Skies (1916) (as Sid Algier) .... Al, ranch hand
- My Fighting Gentleman ... a.k.a. A Son of Battle (USA) (1917) (as Sid Algier) .... Jim
- A Light Woman (1920)
- The Dangerous Age (1923)
- The Wanters (1923) (uncredited) .... bit part

=== Director ===
- Wild Horse (1931) ... a.k.a. Silver Devil (US: reissue title)

=== Writer ===
- A Light Woman (1920) (scenario)
