= M. H. Hoffman =

American film producer

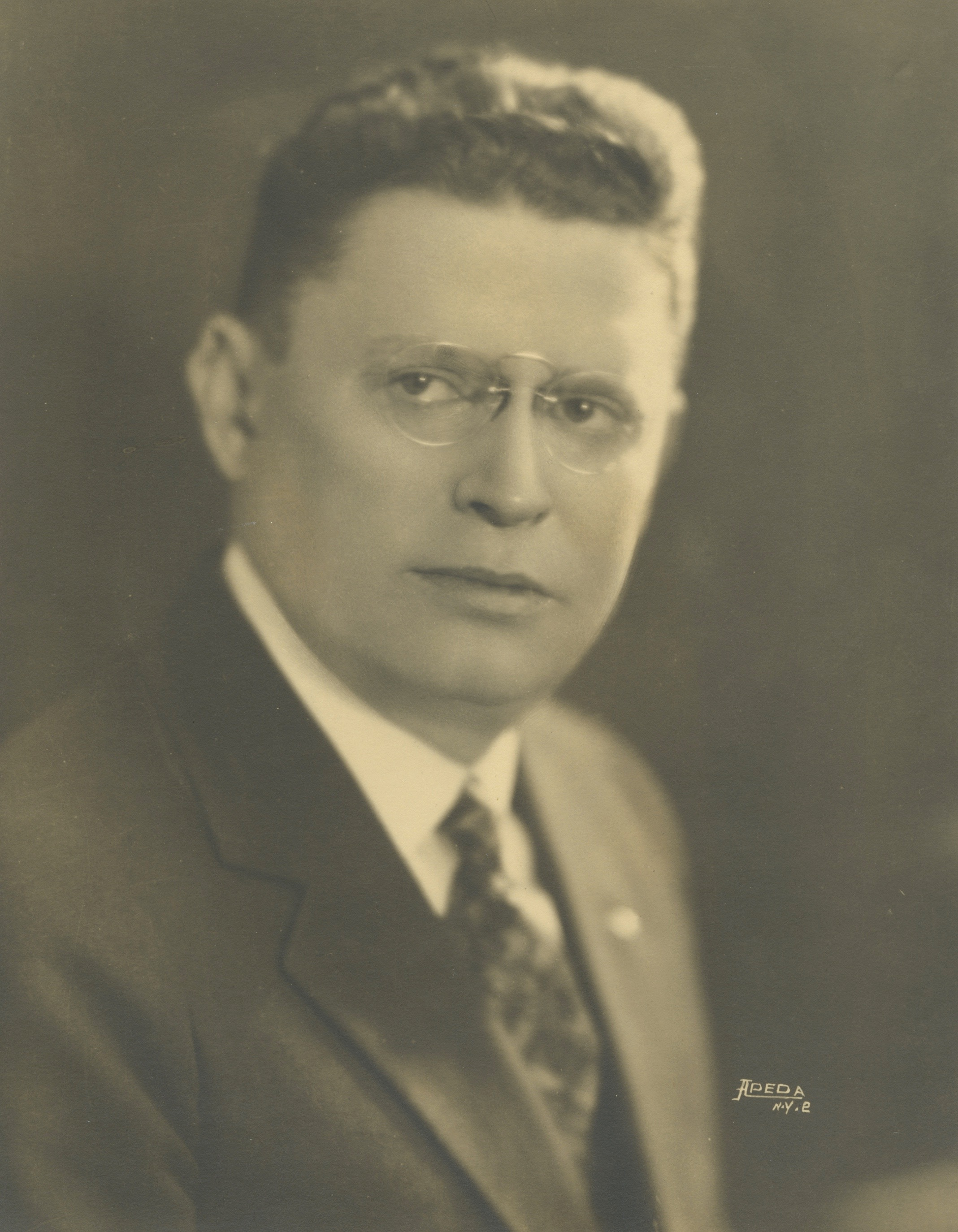
- Born: March 21, 1881; Chicago, Illinois, U.S.
- Died: March 6, 1944 (aged 62); Los Angeles, California, U.S.
- Occupations: Film producer, production company founder
- Years active: 1910–1938 (film)

Maurice Henry Hoffman (March 21, 1881 – March 6, 1944) was an American studio owner and film producer. In the 1920s and 30s, Hoffman made films for seven different studios. He is particularly associated with Poverty Row where studios he founded – Allied Pictures, Liberty Pictures and Tiffany Pictures – produced mainly low-budget B pictures.

== Early years ==
Born in Chicago on March 20, 1881, Hoffman earned a Bachelor of Law degree in 1900 from New York University. He was admitted to the bar in New York, New Jersey, and Massachusetts and practiced law until 1910.

== Studio years ==
From 1910 to 1917, Hoffman was general manager of the Universal Film Company, a film exchange in New England. He resigned in 1917 to independently produce and distribute pictures.

In 1920 Hoffman co-founded Tiffany Pictures (later Tiffany-Stahl Pictures) in Hollywood with Mae Murray and her then-husband, Robert Z. Leonard. The largest of the Poverty Row studios, Tiffany Pictures produced eight Mae Murray pictures, considered outstanding productions then. Between 1921 and 1932, the studio released at least 70 silent and sound features. Tiffany-Stahl booked its films into nearly 2,500 theaters but was hurt by the lack of a profitable distribution network.

In the 1922-1926 period, Hoffman was General Advisory Director. and then Vice President of Truart Film Corporation, a New York production and film exchange company.

In 1930 Hoffman founded and was Acting President and General Manager of Liberty Productions.

In 1931 Hoffman founded and was President of Allied Pictures Corporation. His son, M. H. (Paul E.) Hoffman, Jr., was vice president. At Allied, Hoffman signed Ginger Rogers, Lila Lee and Hoot Gibson and used the profits from their films to back literary adaptations that he wanted to make, including "Vanity Fair (1932)" and "Unholy Love (1932)."

In 1932, Hoffman was president of the Independent Motion Pictures Producers Association (IMPPA). Comparable to the Motion Pictures Producers Association, the organization dealt primarily with production and union problems.

A contract dispute with Gibson and growing indebtedness to Herbert Yates of Consolidated Film Service for film processing ended Allied in 1934. Hoffman reopened Liberty Pictures and produced thirteen movies, mostly literary adaptions of short stories and popular novels. In 1935, Yates foreclosed on the remaining assets of Allied and Liberty Pictures and merged the studio assets into his newly formed Republic Pictures. Hoffman left Republic shortly after that and produced three more films at Grand National before retiring in 1938.

== Personal life ==
Hoffman and his wife, Mary, had a daughter, Hermine Hoffman Ruskin, and two sons, M. H. Jr. (Paul. E. Hoffman) and George F. (adopted).

On March 20, 1935, the wild yelping of the Hoffman family dog, Mitzi, was credited with saving the lives of Hoffman and five family members from an early morning house fire. All six escaped the fire through a first-floor window. The fire destroyed the Hoffman home, which contained many valuable works of art.

Hoffman died in Los Angeles on March 6, 1944, at age 61. His cremated remains were taken to New York for inurnment.

== Selected filmography ==
- Suspicion (1918). M.H. Hoffman Productions. Producer
- Broadway Gold (1923). Truart Pictures. Co-producer
- The Drums of Jeopardy (1923). M.H. Hoffman Inc. Producer
- Let's Go (1923). Carlos Productions and Richard Talmadge Productions. Producer
- Daring Love (1924). M. H. Hoffman Productions. Producer
- In Fast Company (1924). Carlos Productions. Producer
- Pals (1925). Truart Pictures. Producer
- Three in Exile (1925). Truart Pictures. Co-producer
- Husband Hunters (1927). Tiffany Productions. Producer
- One Hour of Love (1927). Tiffany Productions. Co-producer
- Ex-Flame (1930). Liberty Pictures Corp. Co-producer
- Forgotten Women (1931). Trem Carr Pictures. Co-producer
- Hard Hombre (1931). Allied Pictures. Producer
- The She-Wolf (1931). Liberty Pictures. Co-producer
- The Boiling Point (1932). Allied Pictures. Producer
- Officer Thirteen (1932). Allied Pictures. Producer
- A Parisian Romance (1932). Allied Pictures. Producer
- The Stoker (1932). Allied Pictures. Co-producer
- The Thirteenth Guest (1932). Monogram Pictures Corp. Producer
- Unholy Love (1932). Allied Pictures. Executive Producer
- Vanity Fair (1932). Allied Pictures. Producer
- The Eleventh Commandment (1933). Allied Pictures. Producer
- The Fighting Parson (1933). Allied Pictures. Producer
- File 113 (1933). Allied Pictures. Producer
- The Iron Master (1933) Allied Pictures. Producer
- The Intruder (1933). Allied Pictures. Producer
- One Year Later (1933). Allied Pictures. Producer
- A Shriek in the Night (1933). Allied Pictures. Co-producer
- West of Singapore (1933). Monogram Pictures. Co-producer
- Cheaters (1934). Liberty Pictures Corp. Producer
- No Ransom (1934). Liberty Pictures Corp. Producer
- Once to Every Bachelor (1934). Liberty Pictures Corp. Producer
- Picture Brides (1934). Allied Pictures. Producer
- Romance in Rhythm (1934). Allied Pictures. Producer
- School for Girls (1934). Liberty Pictures Corp. Producer
- Take the Stand (1934). Liberty Pictures Corp. Producer
- Two Heads on a Pillow (Love Can't Lose) (1934). Liberty Pictures Corp. Producer
- When Strangers Meet (1934). Liberty Pictures Corp. Producer
- Born to Gamble (1935). Liberty Pictures Corp. Producer
- Champagne for Breakfast (1935). Liberty Pictures Corp. Producer
- The Crime of Dr. Crespi (1935). Liberty Pictures Corp. Producer
- Dizzy Dames (1935). Liberty Pictures Corp. Producer
- The Old Homestead (1935). Liberty Pictures Corp. Producer
- The Spanish Cape Mystery (1935). Liberty Pictures Corp./ Republic Pictures Corp. Producer
- Sweepstake Annie (1935). Liberty Pictures Corp. Producer
- Without Children (Penthouse Party) (1935). Liberty Pictures Corp. Producer
- King of the Sierras (1938). Grand National Pictures. Producer

== Sources ==
- Donald Crafton. The Talkies: American Cinema's Transition to Sound 1926–1931. The University of California Press, 1997.
- E.J. Stephens and Marc Wanamaker, Marc. Early Poverty Row Studios. Arcadia Publishing. 2014
- Michael R. Pitts. Poverty Row Studios, 1929–1940: An Illustrated History of 55 Independent Film Companies, with a Filmography for Each. McFarland & Company, 2005.
- Read, Robert (August 2010). A Squalid-Looking Place: Poverty Row Films of the 1930s. McGill University. "Thesis, Doctor of Philosophy, Department of Art History and Communication Studies"
