= Take the Stand =

1934 film directed by Phil Rosen

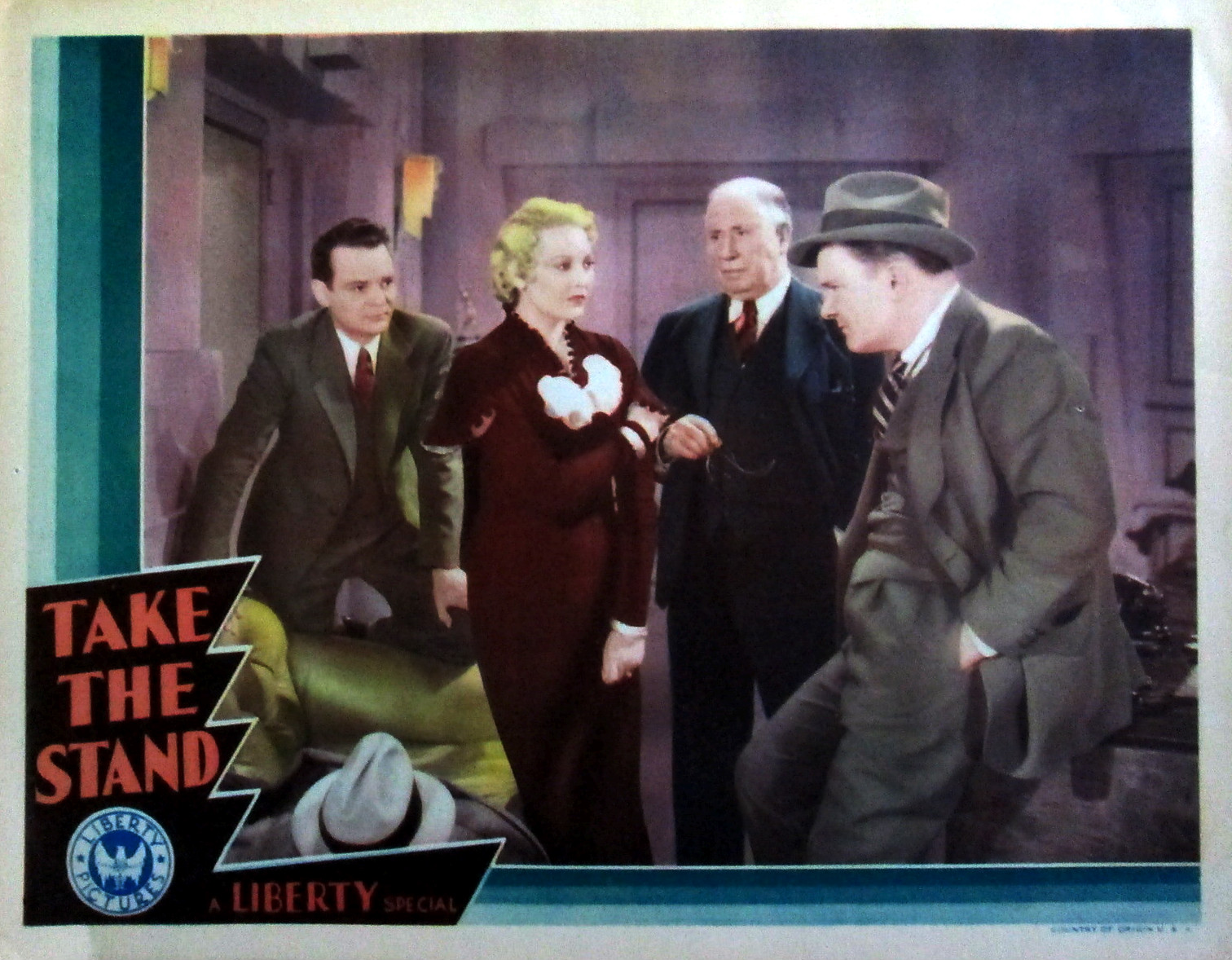
- Lobby card
- Directed by: Phil Rosen
- Written by: Albert DeMond
- Based on: the short story, "The Deuce of Hearts" by Earl Derr Biggers
- Produced by: M. H. Hoffman
- Starring: Jack LaRue; Thelma Todd; Gail Patrick
- Cinematography: Harry Neumann; Tom Galligan
- Edited by: Mildred Johnston
- Music by: Abe Meyer
- Production company: Liberty Pictures
- Release date: September 7, 1934 (US)
- Running time: 78 minutes
- Country: United States
- Language: English

Take the Stand is a 1934 American mystery film directed by Phil Rosen and starring Jack LaRue, Thelma Todd, and Gail Patrick. It was released on September 7, 1934. Copyright 26 Mar 1934 LP4575

== Plot ==
Based on the short story “The Deuce of Hearts” by Earl Derr Biggers, the creator of the Charlie Chan film and book series.

This mystery combines a murder in a locked room with the ‘modern cutting-edge’ technology of nationwide radio broadcasting. It also includes a subplot about a grizzled old cop trying to solve a murder the old-fashioned way, alongside a young fellow (Russell Hopton) who wants to use science to track down the killer.

George Gaylord (Jack LaRue), an influential New York newspaper gossip columnist and radio broadcaster, is widely resented by the city's elite for publishing damaging scandals. Prior to his murder, several prominent figures are shown to have motives to want him dead, including millionaire financier Jerome Burbank (Berton Churchill), his daughter Cornelia (Gail Patrick), actor Joe Reynolds (Jason Robards Sr.), gangster Ernie Paddocks (Bradley Page), and radio singer Percy Dale (Arnold Gray).

Just let them try. Every evening, when Gaylord reveals his information on his radio program, he locks himself in a windowless room, stands before the microphone, and dishes gossip. No one has a key to the room except for the radio station manager several floors away.

On his final broadcast of the year, Gaylord promises to make his most shocking revelation yet. On Christmas Eve, all of Gaylord’s recent targets gather at the radio station.

Suddenly it is airtime, and the reporter tells the audience that tonight he will be telling the world about… Then the audience hears Gaylord scream “Don’t shoot,” which is followed by a gunshot. When the station manager arrives with the door key, the suspects and station manager enter the room and find the gossip columnist dead.

When the police arrive, they discover that every suspect is carrying a gun, but only Burbank’s has been fired.

The medical examiner claims Gaylord was stabbed, not shot. But Burbank is arrested. Disgusted by the police commissioner’s determination to convict Burbank, Hamilton resigns from the force and agrees to help Cornelia (Gail Patrick) exonerate her father.

As the jury deliberates Burbank’s fate, Hamilton declares that he has solved the mystery and leaves to gather his evidence. When he returns, he reveals to the court who really killed Gaylord.

== Cast ==
- Jack LaRue as George Gaylord
- Thelma Todd as Sally Oxford, Gaylord's secretary
- Gail Patrick as Cornelia Burbank
- Russell Hopton as Bill Hamilton
- Berton Churchill as Jerome Burbank
- Vince Barnett as Tony
- Leslie Fenton as Hugh Halliburton
- Sheila Terry as Pearl Reynolds
- Paul Hurst as Denny O'Brien
- De Witt Jennings as the police commissioner

Uncredited cast members include:

- Bradley Page as Ernie Paddock
- Oscar Apfel as Mr. Nevin
- Jason Robards Sr. as Joe Reynolds, stage and screen star
- Richard Tucker (actor) as Mr. Burnside
- Arnold Gray as Percy Dale
- Eddie Kane newspaper publisher Burbank
- Lew Kelly as the medical examiner
- Al Hill man at the radio station

== Crew ==
- Producer, M. H. Hoffman
- Associate producer, M. H. Hoffman Jr.
- Director, Phil Rosen
- Story, continuity & dialogue, Albert DeMond
- Production manager, Ray Culley
- Cinematographer, Tom Galligan and Harry Neumann
- Music supervisor, Abe Meyer
- Film editor, Mildred Johnston
- Recording, W. C. Smith
