= Unholy Love =

1932 film

- DVD cover
- Directed by: Albert Ray
- Written by: Frances Hyland (screenplay); Gustave Flaubert (novel Madame Bovary)
- Produced by: Albert Ray
- Starring: H. B. Warner; Lila Lee; Beryl Mercer; Joyce Compton; Lyle Talbot; Ivan Lebedeff; Jason Robards, Sr. Kathlyn Williams; Richard Carlyle; Frances Rich; Wilson Benge; Al Bridge
- Cinematography: Tom Galligan; Harry Neumann
- Edited by: Mildred Johnston
- Music by: Abe Meyer
- Production company: Albert Ray Productions
- Distributed by: Allied Pictures
- Release date: June 9, 1932
- Running time: 75 minutes
- Country: United States
- Language: English

Unholy Love (released in the United Kingdom as Deceit) is a 1932 American pre-Code drama film directed and produced by Albert Ray. It was the first film adaptation of Gustave Flaubert's 1857 French novel Madame Bovary produced.

The film was quickly forgotten when more successful film adaptations of Madame Bovary were produced thereafter, such as Jean Renoir's 1934 version and Vincente Minnelli's 1949 version. For the 1932 film, Ray renamed all the characters and moved the location of the story to Rye, New York. In actuality, this movie bears little resemblance to Madame Bovary. In the opening credits the following statement appears: Suggested by Gustav Flaubert's famous novel "Madame Bovary."

== Plot ==
The movie opens with Jerry (Lyle Talbot), a doctor, comforting Sheila (Joyce Compton) at the bed of her dying father. Jerry's father (H. B. Warner), Daniel, also a doctor, enters and tries to help. There is nothing that can be done for the man, and he quietly dies. Sheila, distraught, runs from the room, and Jerry learns from his father that the man has died. Jerry tells his father he has married Sheila. Clearly this displeases Daniel and we learn that Sheila is the gardener's daughter. Realizing the woman who Jerry had been dating, Jane (Lila Lee), must be told, Daniel visits her and her mother. Jane's mother is horrified at the outrage, but Jane takes the news in stride, if not very hurt.

Sheila and Jerry move into his father's home and Sheila tries to meet people. However, no one will have anything to do with her. Sheila meets the neighbor Alex, (Ivan Lebedeff) at the next door tennis court and they spend a great deal of time together. Thinking that Sheila is not so bad and just a poor lonely girl, Daniel decides to take her to a dance at the club one evening that Jerry has to work. The crowd snubs Sheila, but Jane decides to be hospitable and invites Sheila and Daniel to join them at the table with her and Alex. Later, we discover that Sheila has borrowed a great deal of money and bought a house in order for Alex and Sheila to have their trysts. Sheila continues to throw herself at Alex, and eventually Jerry discovers that she owes a great deal of money. Daniel offers to repay the money, but he also checks up on the house that Sheila has purchased and learns that the woman who had taken care of Sheila's father during his last illness (Beryl Mercer) is living at the house as a housekeeper. The housekeeper tells Daniel what has been going on at the house, and that Sheila is no good and has been no good all her life.

Heartbroken, Daniel returns home and to confront Sheila, and tells her that he has ordered Alex to leave town. Sheila is horrified at losing Alex and drives to his house. Alex is getting ready to go, and lets Sheila know the affair is over. Jane enters the home during this conversation. Sheila exclaims that if Alex is through with her, she will kill herself, and runs from the house, speeding off in her car. Worried, Jane runs after her and follows Sheila in her own car. Sheila rounds a sharp curve and drives off a bridge, dying in the accident. The police state it is clearly an accident, but Jane and Daniel know it is really suicide and that Jerry should never know.

== See also ==
- List of films in the public domain in the United States
