= The Boiling Point =

1932 film

- Directed by: George Melford
- Written by: Donald W. Lee
- Produced by: M.H. Hoffman
- Starring: Hoot Gibson; Helen Foster; Wheeler Oakman
- Cinematography: Tom Galligan; Harry Neumann
- Edited by: Mildred Johnston
- Production company: M.H. Hoffman Inc.
- Distributed by: Allied Pictures
- Release date: July 15, 1932
- Running time: 70 minutes
- Country: United States
- Language: English

The Boiling Point is a 1932 American western film directed by George Melford and starring Hoot Gibson, Helen Foster and Wheeler Oakman. It was distributed by the independent Poverty Row studio Allied Pictures.

== Plot ==
The hot-tempered Jimmy Duncan is sent by his uncle to work on a ranch for a one-month probation period. If he gets into one fight during that time, he will be disinherited. This leads to problems when he confronts a gang of robbers.

== Cast ==
Top billing

- Hoot Gibson as Jimmy Duncan
- Helen Foster as Laura Kirk
- Wheeler Oakman as Holt Norbo, Bank Cashier
- Skeeter Bill Robbins as High, one of Kirk's hands
- Billy Bletcher as Stubby, one of Kirk's hands
- Lafe McKee as Tom Kirk
- Charles Brinley as Gonzales
- Bill Nye (G. Raymond Nye) as Nick, the Henchman
- Tom London as Pete Mallis, the Henchman
- George 'Gabby' Hayes as George Duncan

Rest of cast (uncredited)

- Victor Adamson as man at the dance
- Bobby Burns (actor) as McCall
- Bob Card as cowhand
- Frank Ellis (actor) as cantina drunk
- Fred Gilman as Jimmy's friend
- Herman Hack as deputy
- Al Haskell as cantina musician
- Carmen Laroux as Rosita
- Edgar Lewis as sherriff #1 in the cantina
- William McCall (actor) as sherriff #2 in the cantina
- Lew Meehan as catina cowhand
- Art Mix as Art, one of Kirk's hands
- Merrill McCormick as Henchman Jenks
- Hattie McDaniel as Caroline, the Cook
- Art Mix as Art
- Artie Ortego as henchman
- Alan Roscoe as George Duncan's foreman
- George Sowards as henchman guard
- Al Taylor (actor) as deputy with sherrif #2

Rest of crew

- Production Manager Sidney Algier and Ray Culley (uncredited)
- Recorded by L. E. Tope
- Assistant Director Wilbur McGaugh

== Trivia ==
Hattie McDaniel acted in her first five films in 1932. One of them was The Boiling Point. She had two scenes with Hoot Gibson, playing Caroline, the cook. Seven years later, McDaniel was the first African American actor to be nominated for and win an Oscar for her performance as Mammy, the enslaved house servant, in Gone with the Wind (1939).

== Bibliography ==
- Pitts, Michael R. Poverty Row Studios, 1929–1940: An Illustrated History of 55 Independent Film Companies, with a Filmography for Each. McFarland & Company, 2005.
