= Wild Horse (1931 film) =

1931 film

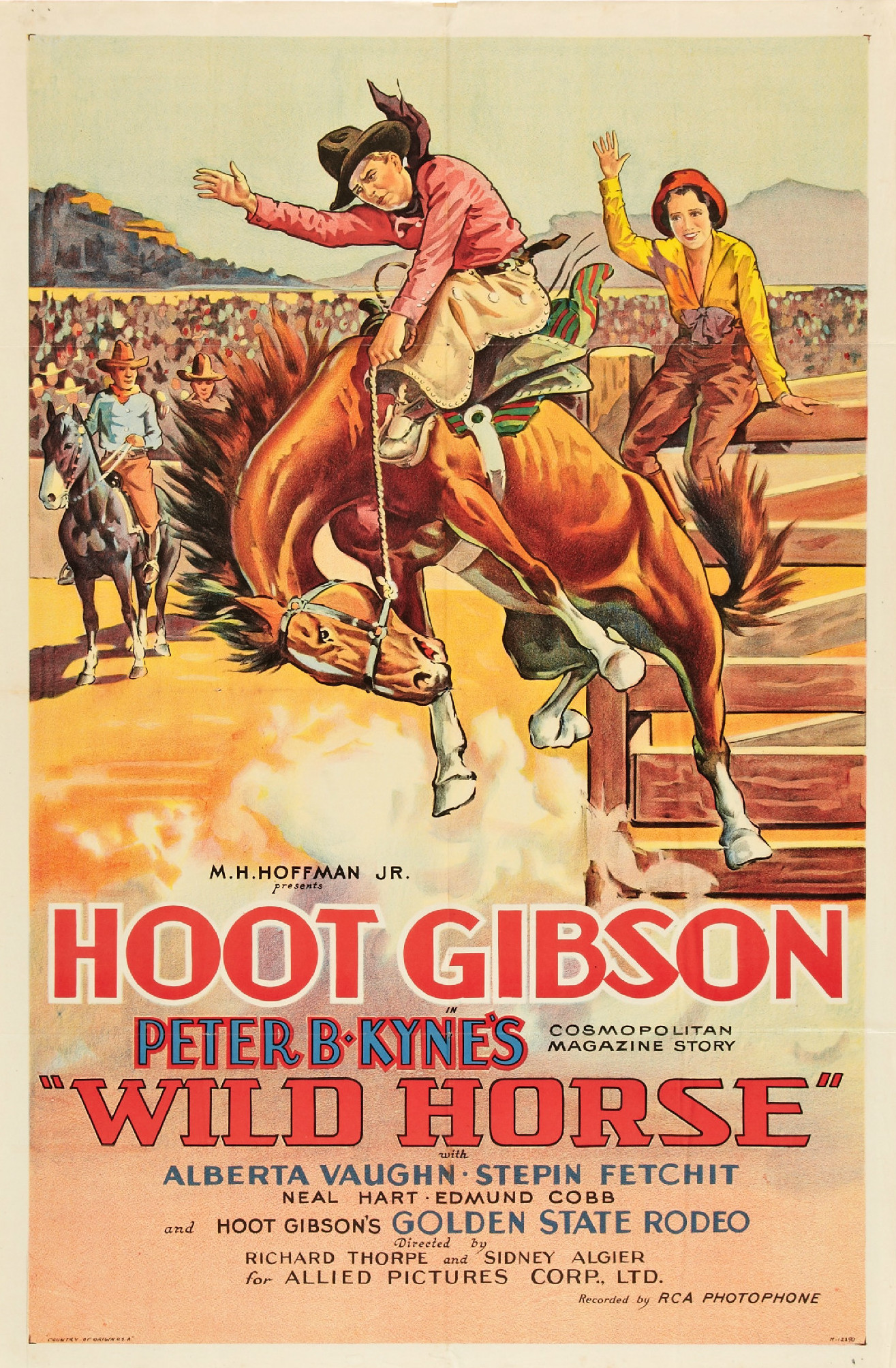
- Poster
- Directed by: Richard Thorpe
- Written by: Jack Natteford
- Based on: a story by Peter B. Kyne
- Produced by: M. H. Hoffman
- Starring: Hoot Gibson
- Cinematography: Ernest Miller
- Edited by: Mildred Johnston
- Distributed by: Allied Pictures
- Release date: August 2, 1931
- Running time: 77 minutes
- Country: United States
- Language: English

Wild Horse is a 1931 American Western film directed by Richard Thorpe and starring Hoot Gibson and Alberta Vaughn. It was based on the Cosmopolitan Magazine short story by Peter B. Kyne.

== Cast ==
- Hoot Gibson - Jim Wright
- Alberta Vaughn - Alice Hall
- Stepin Fetchit - Stepin
- Neal Hart - Hank Howard
- Edmund Cobb - Gil Davis
- George Bunny - Col. Ben Hall
- Edward Peil, Sr. - Sheriff
- Skeeter Bill Robbins - Skeeter Bill Burke
- Joe Rickson - Deputy Clark
- Fred Gilman - Wally the Drunk

== See also ==
- List of films about horses
