= Winner Take All (1939 film) =

1939 film by Otto Brower

- Film poster
- Directed by: Otto Brower
- Written by: Jerome Cady
- Screenplay by: Albert Ray; Frances Hyland
- Produced by: Jerry Hoffman
- Starring: Tony Martin; Gloria Stuart; Henry Armetta
- Cinematography: Edward Cronjager
- Edited by: Nick DeMaggio
- Music by: Samuel Kaylin
- Production company: 20th Century Fox
- Release date: March 30, 1939
- Running time: 60 minutes
- Country: United States
- Language: English

Winner Take All is a 1939 American drama film directed by Otto Brower and starring Tony Martin, Gloria Stuart, and Henry Armetta.

== Plot ==
A rodeo rider from Montana stranded in New York City with no money, Steve Bishop can't pay for his meal at Papa and Mama Gambini's restaurant, so he offers to work off his debt as a waiter. When someone else interested in that job harasses Papa, he is flattened by Steve.

Eyewitnesses among the customers include a sportswriter, Julie Harrison, and her boyfriend, fight promoter Tom Walker. A chance is offered Steve to participate in a boxing exhibition with six men in a ring at once. He ends up the victor, raising money for a good cause supported by Papa.

Walker decides to promote Steve as a prizefighter, and he begins earning victories and money. Steve doesn't realize these fights have been fixed in advance. Julie teaches him a lesson the hard way, telling Steve's next opponent to deck him. Walker, no longer able to promote Steve as undefeated, sells Julie his contract for 25 cents. Under her guidance, he is able to upset Paulie Mitchell in his next fight, pleasing Papa and Julie both.

== Cast ==
- Tony Martin as Steve Bishop
- Gloria Stuart as Julie Harrison
- Henry Armetta as Papa Gambini
- Kane Richmond as Paulie Mitchell
- Slim Summerville as Muldoon
- Robert Allen as Tom Walker

== See also ==
- List of boxing films
