= Guilty or Not Guilty (film) =

1932 film

- Directed by: Albert Ray
- Written by: Arthur Hoerl; Frances Hyland
- Produced by: William T. Lackey; M. H. Hoffman; Trem Carr
- Starring: Betty Compson; Claudia Dell; Wheeler Oakman
- Cinematography: Harry Neumann; Tom Galligan
- Production company: William T. Lackey Productions
- Distributed by: Monogram Pictures
- Release date: November 15, 1932
- Running time: 70 minutes
- Country: United States
- Language: English

Guilty or Not Guilty is a 1932 American crime film directed by Albert Ray and starring Betty Compson, Claudia Dell and Wheeler Oakman. It was distributed by Monogram Pictures, one of the leading Poverty Row independents of Hollywood.

== Cast ==
- Betty Compson as Maizie
- Claudia Dell as Ruth Payne
- Tom Douglas as Tony Halliday
- George Irving as John Halliday
- Wheeler Oakman as Joe
- Luis Alberni as Pete
- Walter Percival as Brennan
- William B. Davidson as Chief
- Erin La Bissoniere as Margaret Ryan

== Bibliography ==
- Fetrow, Alan G. Sound films, 1927-1939: a United States Filmography. McFarland, 1992.
