= Trailin' Trouble =

1937 US film directed by Arthur Rosson

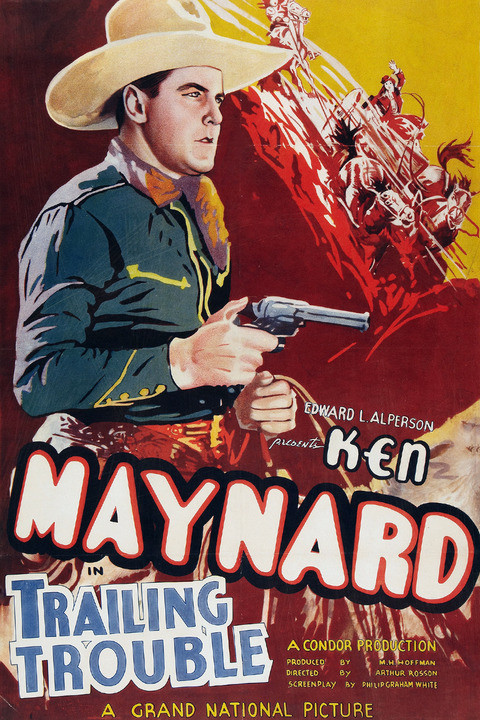
- Directed by: Arthur Rosson
- Screenplay by: Graham White
- Story by: E. Morton Hough
- Produced by: M. H. Hoffman Jr.
- Starring: Ken Maynard; Lona Andre; Roger Williams
- Cinematography: Arthur Martinelli; Tom Galligan
- Production company: Condor Pictures
- Distributed by: Grand National Films
- Release date: November 12, 1937 (US)
- Running time: 58 minutes
- Country: United States
- Language: English

Trailin' Trouble is a 1937 American Western film directed by Arthur Rosson and starring Ken Maynard, Lona Andre, and Roger Williams. It was released on November 12, 1937. During production its working title was Alias Blackie Burke.

== Plot ==
A remake of the 1931 Allied Pictures The Hard Hombre.

== Cast ==
- Ken Maynard as John "Friendly" Fields and Blackie Burke
- Lona Andre as Patty Blair
- Roger Williams as Tom Crocker
- Fred Burns as Sheriff Jake Jones
- Phil Dunham as Nester
- Marin Sais as Mrs. Burns
- Tarzan as Himself
- Grace Wood as Mrs. Dunn
