= Tom Galligan (cinematographer) =

American cinematographer

- Born: September 24, 1891
- Died: May 10, 1965 (aged 73); Los Angeles, California, United States
- Occupation: Cinematographer
- Years active: 1931–1938 (film)

Tom Galligan (1891–1965) was an American cinematographer. He was active on Poverty Row in the 1930s for a variety of different companies, particularly for Allied Pictures.

== Selected filmography ==
- The Galloping Ghost (1931)
- The Lightning Warrior (1931)
- Vanity Fair (1932)
- Cowboy Counsellor (1932)
- The Local Bad Man (1932)
- The Stoker (1932)
- Officer Thirteen (1932)
- Guilty or Not Guilty (1932)
- A Parisian Romance (1932)
- A Man's Land (1932)
- The Boiling Point (1932)
- Unholy Love (1932)
- File 113 (1933)
- One Year Later (1933)
- Laughing at Life (1933)
- The Dude Bandit (1933)
- The Wolf Dog (1933)
- The Intruder (1933)
- The Iron Master (1933)
- A Shriek in the Night (1933)
- The Eleventh Commandment (1933)
- When Strangers Meet (1934)
- Cheaters (1934)
- Take the Stand (1934)
- Once to Every Bachelor (1934)
- The Pecos Dandy (1934)
- Picture Brides (1934)
- Boots of Destiny (1937)
- Trailing Trouble (1937)
- Captain Calamity (1938)
- King of the Sierras (1938)

== Bibliography ==
- Pitts, Michael R. Poverty Row Studios, 1929–1940: An Illustrated History of 55 Independent Film Companies, with a Filmography for Each. McFarland & Company, 2005.
