= The Cheaters (1945 film) =

1945 film by Joseph Kane

- Theatrical release poster
- Directed by: Joseph Kane
- Screenplay by: Frances Hyland
- Story by: Frances Hyland; Albert Ray
- Produced by: Joseph Kane (associate producer)
- Starring: Joseph Schildkraut
- Cinematography: Reggie Lanning
- Edited by: Richard L. Van Enger
- Music by: Walter Scharf
- Production company: Republic Pictures
- Distributed by: Republic Pictures
- Release date: July 14, 1945
- Running time: 87 minutes
- Country: United States
- Language: English

The Cheaters (1945), also known as MR. M. and the Pigeons, The Amazing MR. M., The Magnificent Mr. M. and The Magnificent Rogue, is a Christmas "screwball comedy" tale about a has-been actor invited to Christmas dinner by a rich family. The film was atypical of the Republic Pictures studio, directed by Joseph Kane and starring Joseph Schildkraut. The film was re-released in 1949 under a new title, The Castaway, and when the Republic film catalogue was sold in the 1950s as late night television fodder, it appeared consistently for years as a Christmas staple throughout the 1960s and 1970s.

== Plot ==
New York City businessman James C. Pidgeon (Eugene Pallette) is on the verge of bankruptcy. His only hope is rich uncle Henry, who is on his deathbed. J.C.'s daughter Therese (Ruth Terry) persuades the rest of the family to take in a charity case for the holidays, not out of the goodness of her heart but to impress her upper-class boyfriend Stephen Bates (Robert Livingston) and his mother. From a newspaper list, they pick Anthony Marchand (Joseph Schildkraut), an actor injured in a car accident at the height of his career 10 years before, who is now a broken-down drunk.

J.C.'s son Reggie (David Holt) returns with bad news: Uncle Henry left his $5 million estate to Florie Watson (Ona Munson), a showgirl he had once seen perform as a child actress 30 years before in Uncle Tom's Cabin. The will stipulates if Florie cannot be found within a reasonable amount of time, the estate goes to the Pidgeons. After bribing the sole executor, J.C. conspires to limit the search to just placing newspaper ads for a week without mentioning the inheritance. Furthermore, the executor believes the woman is in New York City, not Denver, where Uncle Henry died.

J.C. decides to look for Florie himself, so he can better keep the news from her. Marchand (awakening from an alcoholic binge) overhears the whole scheme and suggests he can probably find her easily through Actors' Equity. Reggie worries about a blackmail attempt, but Marchand makes a seemingly heartfelt speech about honor and his gratitude to the Pidgeons. He then eavesdrops and walks away without his customary limp, but is spotted by Angela (Anne Gillis), J.C.'s younger daughter. She lets him know that she is amused by his deception and he regains the limp.

Marchand and Willie Crawford (Raymond Walburn), J.C.'s freeloading brother-in-law, have little trouble locating Florie. Willie tells her that they are cousins and that the family wants her to spend the holidays with them. Florie recognizes Marchand's name and confides to him, one trouper to another, that she knows she is not related to the Pidgeons, but as she is broke and behind on her rent, she is eager to play along.

After the search ends up on the front page of the newspaper, the Pidgeons hastily relocate to an isolated house in the country to keep Florie in the dark. When they arrive, they discover that all of their servants have quit. J.C., having been raised there, refuses to hire new ones, fearing that they may be people he grew up with. The family, with the exception of Angela, pitch in. Soon, even Angela is helping out.

Meanwhile, two private detectives are closing in. When they show up at the house, they are lied to, but the detectives are not fooled and set about getting a search warrant.

That night Marchand alludes to the situation, implicitly comparing the family's deception to Jacob Marley's misdeeds in Charles Dickens' A Christmas Carol before passing out from too much drink. All of the Pidgeons are ashamed of themselves and finally confess everything to Florie. Later, Marchand wakes up and departs, leaving a note explaining his divided loyalties. Florie tracks him down at a bar in the nearest town and tells him she is going to give half the money to the Pidgeons.

== Cast ==
- Joseph Schildkraut as Mr. M, aka Anthony Marchand
- Billie Burke as Clara Pidgeon
- Eugene Pallette as James C. Pidgeon
- Ona Munson as Florie Watson
- Raymond Walburn as Willie Crawford
- Anne Gillis as Angela Pidgeon
- Ruth Terry as Therese Pidgeon
- Robert Livingston as Capt. Stephen Bates
- David Holt as Reggie Pidgeon
- Robert Greig as MacFarland, butler
- Hal Taliaferro as Jim McDonald, detective
- Cyril Ring as Steve, McDonald's assistant
- Norma Varden as Mattie Tate, secretary
- Byron Foulger as the process server
- St. Luke's Choristers as the carolers (featuring a solo by Philip D. Haynes) (Note: The St. Luke's Choristers performed as carolers.)

== Production ==
The original story by Frances Hyland and Albert Ray was written in 1941 as a vehicle for Binnie Barnes, a comedian known for supporting roles at major studios and leading roles for "low-rent" studios like Republic. The Cheaters was bought by Paramount as a comeback vehicle for John Barrymore and Carole Lombard, but was shelved and later recast after the deaths of both stars; ultimately, the story was sold to Republic Pictures. At a time when the studio specialized in low-budget westerns, it was an odd choice for Republic to take on a "screwball comedy". Many of the stars had to be borrowed from other studios, including Schildkraut, a legendary stage and silent film star. Principal photography for the production ran from February 1 to mid-March 1945.

== Reception ==
The unnamed critic for The New York Times gave The Cheaters a scathing review:

Republic wasn't kidding when it titled the vapid little film which it delivered yesterday to the Gotham "The Cheaters." It's a swindle, all right. ... the whole thing is trashy—just a compound of witless platitudes. And several good actors are wasted in it.

In a later review, film critic and historian Leonard Maltin was much more charitable: "Excellent cast in enjoyable tale of wealthy family of snobs humanized by downtrodden actor they invite for Christmas dinner."

== Home media ==
The Cheaters has been released on DVD.

== See also ==
- List of Christmas films
