= Boots of Destiny =

- Theatrical release poster
- Directed by: Arthur Rosson
- Screenplay by: Arthur Rosson
- Story by: Philip Graham White
- Produced by: M.H. Hoffman
- Starring: Ken Maynard; Claudia Dell; Vince Barnett; Ed Cassidy; Martin Garralaga; George Morrell
- Cinematography: Tom Galligan
- Edited by: Dan Milner
- Production company: Condor Productions
- Distributed by: Grand National Films Inc.
- Release date: July 16, 1937
- Running time: 56 minutes
- Country: United States
- Language: English

Boots of Destiny is a 1937 American Western film written and directed by Arthur Rosson. The film stars Ken Maynard, Claudia Dell, Vince Barnett, Ed Cassidy, Martin Garralaga and George Morrell. The film was released on July 16, 1937, by Grand National Films Inc.

== Cast ==
- Ken Maynard as Ken Crawford
- Claudia Dell as Alice Wilson
- Vince Barnett as Acey Ducey
- Ed Cassidy as Jack Harmon
- Martin Garralaga as Jose Vasco
- George Morrell as Don Pedro Santos
- Walter Patterson as Pasquale Ortego
- Fred Cordova as Fredico
- Sidney D'Albrook as Sheriff

== Production ==
The production of Gibson's previous film, The Fighting Parson (1933) was delayed. This resulted in Boots of Destiny being pushed to a later filming date.
