= Once to Every Bachelor =

1934 film

- Directed by: William Nigh
- Written by: George Waggner
- Based on: Search for the Spring by Eleanor Gates
- Produced by: M.H. Hoffman
- Starring: Marian Nixon; Neil Hamilton; William Austin
- Cinematography: Tom Galligan; Harry Neumann
- Edited by: Mildred Johnston
- Production company: Liberty Pictures
- Distributed by: Liberty Pictures; Wardour Films (UK)
- Release date: August 23, 1934
- Running time: 72 minutes
- Country: United States
- Language: English

Once to Every Bachelor is a 1934 American drama film directed by William Nigh and starring Marian Nixon, Neil Hamilton and William Austin.

== Plot ==
In order to avoid her connection to the murder of a gangster and his desire to avoid a scandal by being named as a co-respondent in a divorce case, Natalie and society playboy Lyle decide to marry shortly after first meeting. They agree on a marriage of convenience, with a honeymoon in Paris. They sail for Europe on an ocean liner, and Natalie begins to develop feeling for him despite their agreement. Matters are complicated by the presence onboard of Judy, Lyle's former lover and her husband.

== Cast ==
- Marian Nixon as Natalie Stuart
- Neil Hamilton as Lyle Stuart
- William Austin as Mathews
- Raymond Hatton as Uncle John
- Aileen Pringle as Judy Bryant
- Kathleen Howard as Aunt Henrietta
- Ralf Harolde as Schuyler
- Bradley Page as District Attorney Jerry Landers
- George Irving as George Bryant
- Don Alvarado as Rocco

== Bibliography ==
- Goble, Alan. The Complete Index to Literary Sources in Film. Walter de Gruyter, 1999.
