= Clearing the Range =

1931 film

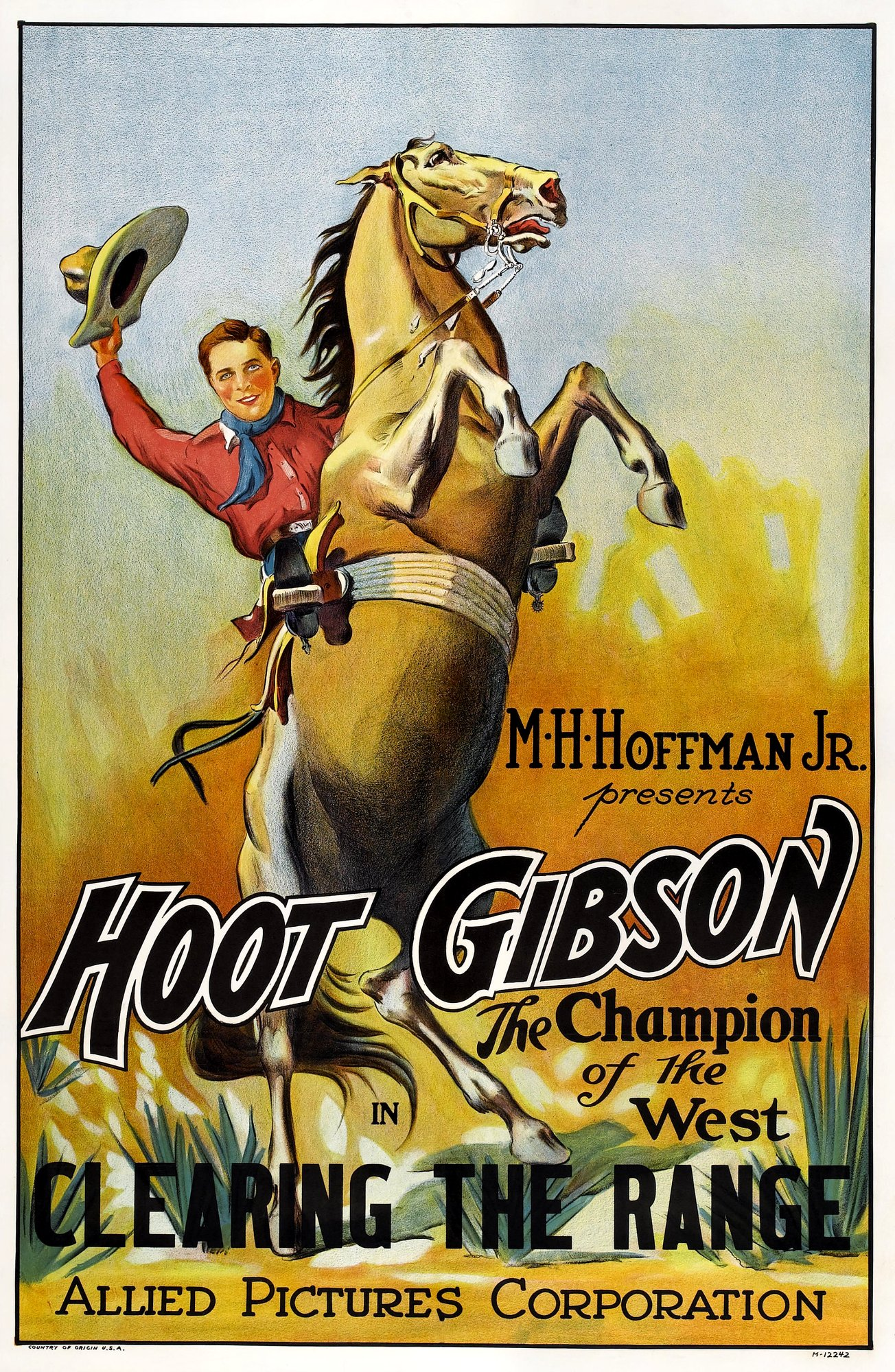
- Film poster
- Directed by: Otto Brower
- Written by: Jack Cunningham
- Screenplay by: Jack Natteford
- Produced by: M.H. Hoffman Jr.
- Starring: Hoot Gibson
- Cinematography: Ernest Miller
- Edited by: Mildred Johnston
- Production company: Allied Pictures
- Release date: April 1, 1931
- Running time: 61 minutes
- Country: United States
- Language: English

Clearing the Range is a 1931 American pre-Code Western film starring Hoot Gibson and his then wife Sally Eilers. Directed by Otto Brower, it was the first film released by the Poverty Row studio Allied Pictures. Gibson remade the film in 1933 as The Dude Bandit.

== Plot ==
Curt Fremont pretends to be a clueless "peaceful man" in front of his friends, but when trouble starts—in this case, his Banker brother has been murdered by his assistant—he resorts to clever trickery without being seen or suspected to undo the villain. By going underground, so to speak, his efforts are more effective in uncovering the murderer than a run-and-gun approach. Inevitably, the female lead, as in this film, looks down her nose at Gibson's public persona, but admires his "other" self's deeds of daring and courage, not realizing it's the same man. Eventually, he relies on fists and guns to finish the job he started with trickery. This unusually complex dual-identity plot device is a hallmark of many of Gibson's films, something that set him apart from many other Western film heroes of the era (and afterwards) who were quick to draw their six shooter to settle disputes.

== Cast ==
- Hoot Gibson as Curt "El Capitan" Fremont
- Sally Eilers as Mary Lou Moran
- Hooper Atchley as Lafe Kildare
- Robert Homans as "Dad" Moran
- Edward Peil Sr. as Sheriff Jim
- George Mendoza as Juan Conares
- Edward Hearn as Jim Fremont
- Maston Williams as George "Slim" Allen

== Production ==
It was filmed in Wildwood Regional Park in Thousand Oaks, California.
