= Cheaters (1934 film) =

1934 film by Phil Rosen

- Directed by: Phil Rosen; Ray Culley, production manager
- Written by: Fanny Heaslip Lea (story); Adele Buffington; Marcy Klauber
- Produced by: M.H. Hoffman; M.H. Hoffman Jr., associate producer
- Starring: William Boyd; June Collyer; Dorothy Mackaill
- Cinematography: Tom Galligan; Harry Neumann
- Edited by: Mildred Johnston
- Music by: Harry Stoddard
- Production company: Liberty Pictures
- Distributed by: Liberty Pictures
- Release date: May 11, 1934
- Running time: 65 minutes
- Country: United States
- Language: English

Cheaters is a 1934 American crime film directed by Phil Rosen and starring William Boyd, June Collyer and Dorothy Mackaill.

Although the film's onscreen credits state that the film was copyrighted in 1933, copyright records list the title with a 1934 copyright date: 30 January 1934, L 4449. Liberty Pictures Corp. The film is loosely based on the short story "The Peacock Screen" by Fanny Heaslip Lea.

== Plot ==
After being released from San Quentin, Kay Murray (June Collyer), wrongly imprisoned for forgery, meets Steve Morris (Bill Boyd), a charming con man who gives her money for a hotel room. Steve’s partners, K.C. Kelly (William Collier Sr.) and Mabel Kelly (Dorothy Mackaill), have befriended millionaire Paul Southern (Alan Mowbray) as part of a scheme to marry him off to Steve’s girlfriend, Rose.

When Rose turns out to be in Cuba, Steve transforms Kay into a glamorous substitute. Southern falls for Kay and proposes, unaware that the gang plans to divorce him after six months and divide his settlement.

Although Steve loves Kay, she accepts Southern’s proposal, hurt by Steve’s willingness to use her for the con. Jealous, Steve calls off the scheme, but K.C. steals Southern’s emeralds. Steve retrieves the jewels and confesses the plot to Southern.

When K.C. is caught by a detective (Guinn 'Big Boy' Williams), Southern declines to press charges, but the gang faces a return to prison for violating parole.

Now in love, Kay and Steve face their fate together.

== Cast ==
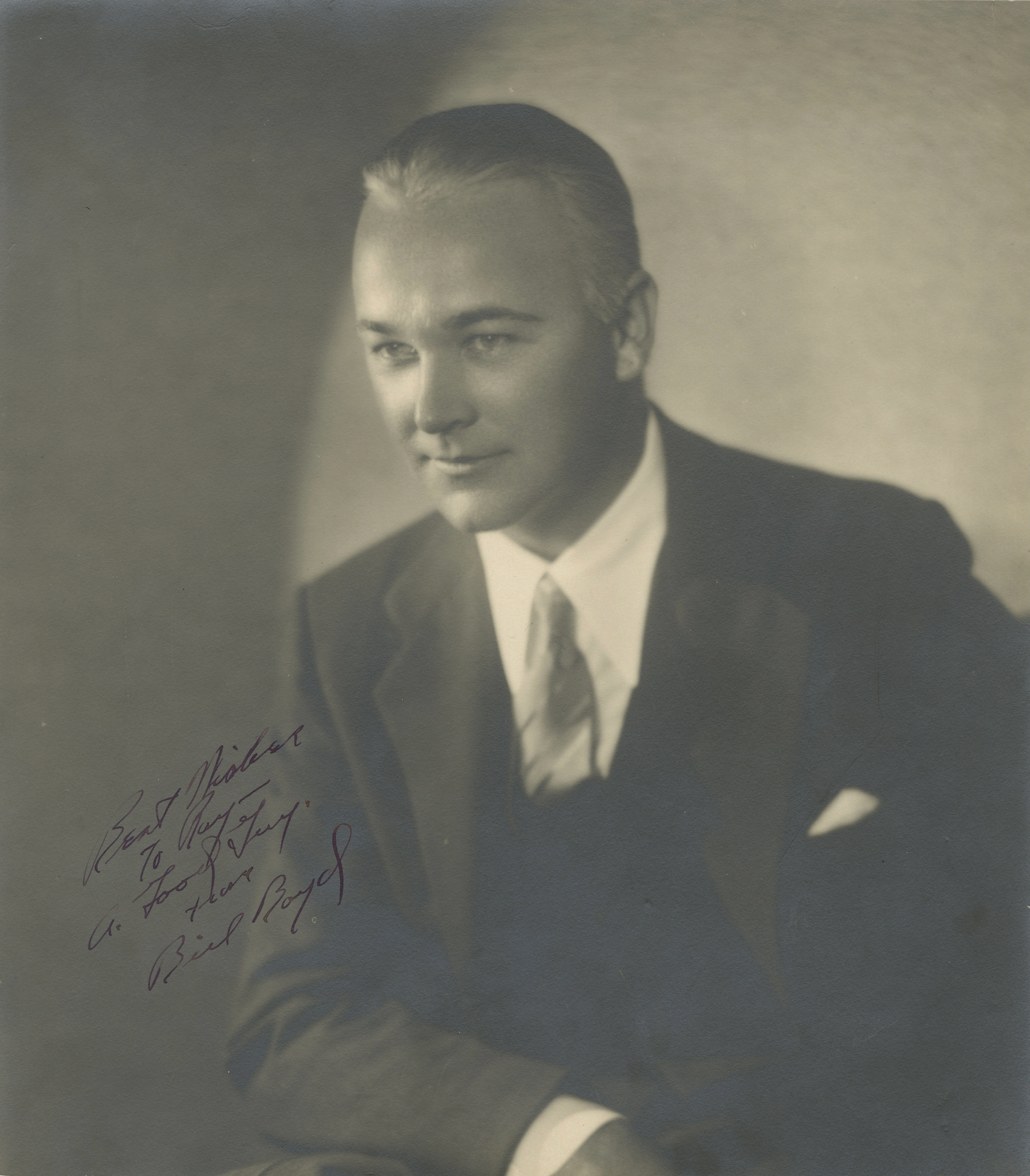
Portrait of William Boyd inscribed to production manager Ray Culley

- William Boyd as Steve Morris
- June Collyer as Kay Murray
- Dorothy Mackaill as Mabel
- William Collier Sr. as K.C. Kelly
- Alan Mowbray as Paul Southern
- Guinn 'Big Boy' Williams as Detective Sweeney
- Louise Beavers as Lily

== Crew ==
- Director – Phil Rosen
- Producers – M. H. Hoffman and M. H. Hoffman Jr.
- Story, continuity and dialogue – Adele Buffington
- Photography – Harry Neumann and Tom Galligan
- Editor – Mildred Johnston
- Music director – Abe Meyer
- Sound – L. E. Clark
- Production manager – Ray Culley
- Lyrics – Marcy Klauber
- Composer – Harry Stoddard

== Bibliography ==
- Pitts, Michael R. Poverty Row Studios, 1929–1940: An Illustrated History of 55 Independent Film Companies, with a Filmography for Each. McFarland & Company, 2005
- New York Times film review of Cheaters."Four Crooks". No. New York Times. May 12, 1934.
