= Officer Thirteen =

1932 film

- Directed by: George Melford
- Written by: Paul Edwards; Frances Hyland
- Produced by: M.H. Hoffman
- Starring: Monte Blue; Lila Lee; Charles Delaney
- Cinematography: Tom Galligan; Harry Neumann
- Edited by: Leete Renick Brown
- Production company: Allied Pictures
- Distributed by: Allied Pictures
- Release date: November 26, 1932
- Running time: 62 minutes
- Country: United States
- Language: English

Officer Thirteen is a 1932 American crime film directed by George Melford and starring Monte Blue, Lila Lee and Charles Delaney. The film features an early performance from the future star Mickey Rooney in a supporting role. As of September 6, 2012, the film is in public domain.

== Plot ==
After his partner is killed in the line of duty, a policeman quits the force and vows to hunt down the group responsible.

== Cast ==
- Monte Blue as Tom Burke
- Lila Lee as Doris Dane
- Charles Delaney as Sandy Malone
- Robert Ellis as Jack Blake
- Frances Rich as Joan Thorpe
- Joseph W. Girard as Chief of Police Kramer
- Seena Owen as Trixi Du Bray
- Mickey Rooney as Buddy Malone
- Jackie Searl as Sammy
- Lloyd Ingraham as Judge Dane
- Florence Roberts as Granny
- George Humbert as Fruit Vendor
- Dot Meyberg as Dolores
- Charles O'Malley as Pete Billings
- Allan Cavan as Police Captain Reed
- Edward Cooper as Rogers, the Dane Butler
