= Liberty Pictures =

American film production company

- Company type: Film Production
- Industry: Entertainment
- Founded: 1930
- Founders: M.H. Hoffman
- Defunct: 1935
- Fate: Acquired by Republic Pictures

Liberty Pictures was an American film production company of the 1930s. Part of Poverty Row, the company produced low-budget B pictures. It was one of two companies controlled by the producer M.H. Hoffman along with Allied Pictures.

The company produced its first film, Ex-Flame, loosely based on the Victorian novel East Lynne, in 1930. In 1935 the company was taken over by the larger Republic Pictures. When absorbing the company, Republic adopted the symbolic motif of Liberty Pictures - the Liberty Bell ringing in Philadelphia. This merger constituted an attempt by Herbert Yates to rationalize Poverty Row and create a ninth major studio.

== Filmography ==
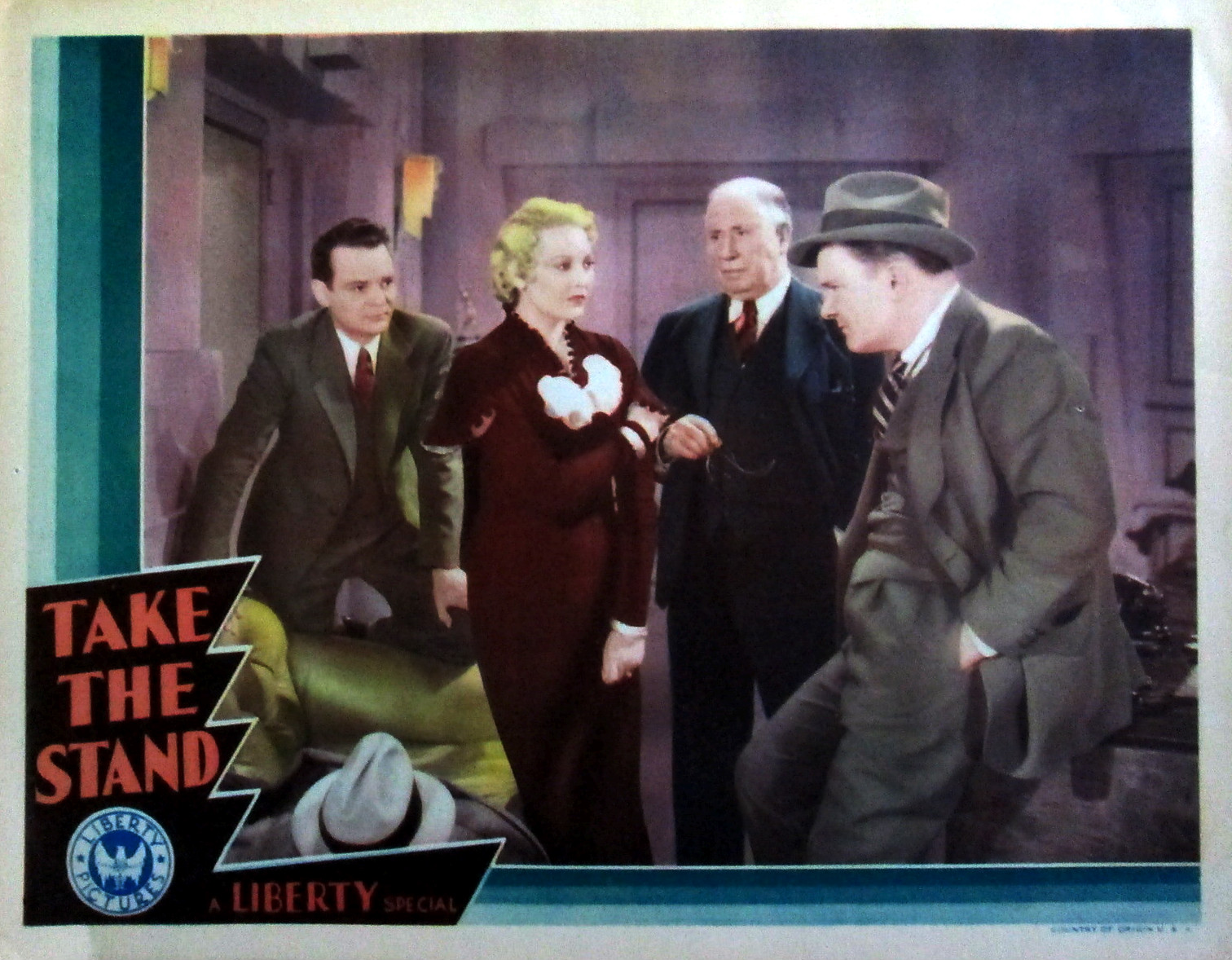
Lobby card for Take the Stand (1934)

- Ex-Flame (1930)
- The She-Wolf (1931)
- Cheaters (1934)
- Once to Every Bachelor (1934)
- Take the Stand (1934)
- Two Heads on a Pillow (1934)
- When Strangers Meet (1934)
- School for Girls (1934)
- No Ransom (1934)
- Sweepstake Annie (1935)
- The Crime of Dr. Crespi (1935)
- Born to Gamble (1935)
- The Old Homestead (1935)
- The Spanish Cape Mystery (1935)
- Dizzy Dames (1935)
- Without Children (1935)

== Bibliography ==
- Balio Tino. Grand Design: Hollywood as a Modern Business Entertprise 1930-1939. University of California Press, 1995.
- Pitts, Michael R. Poverty Row Studios, 1929–1940: An Illustrated History of 55 Independent Film Companies, with a Filmography for Each. McFarland & Company, 2005.
