= Picture Brides =

1933 film by Phil Rosen

- Directed by: Phil Rosen
- Written by: Adele Buffington
- Based on: Red Kisses by Charles E. Blaney
- Produced by: M.H. Hoffman
- Starring: Dorothy Mackaill; Regis Toomey; Alan Hale
- Cinematography: Tom Galligan
- Edited by: Mildred Johnston
- Distributed by: Allied Pictures
- Release date: November 1, 1933 (US)
- Running time: 66 minutes
- Country: United States
- Language: English

Picture Brides is a 66-minute, black-and-white, 1933 American pre-Code steamy melodrama, directed by Phil Rosen. The film stars Dorothy Mackaill, Regis Toomey and Alan Hale.

The film is based on a stage play by Charles E. Blaney and Harry Clay Blaney.

Copyright L4140 19 Sep. 1933 by Allied Pictures Corp. Studio production code 602.

== Plot ==
Four women sign up as brides for workers in a remote diamond mine in South America.

Into the jungle comes a riverboat bearing the four “picture brides” – Mame (Dorothy Mackaill), Flo (Ester Muir), Gwen (Mae Busch), and Lena (Viva Tattersall). Also aboard is Mary Lee (Dorothy Libaitre), a frightened, innocent young woman who is to see the mine boss, the sadistic Van Luden (Alan Hale), about a job.

At the mine, Dave Hart (Regis Toomey), a partner, learns the women are on their way. Dave is marrying one of the women based on a bet he made with his partner, Van Luden.

Brownie (Will Ahern, Gladys's real-life husband), an ex-prizefighter, heads off to meet the riverboat. As the women travel with Brownie through the jungle, the car breaks down, forcing them to walk the last few miles.

At the mine office, Van Luden fires one of the natives, and when he talks back, Van Luden shoots him and orders him thrown into the swamp. Dave arrives and tells Doc to take the native back to his hut. Mame, realizing the kind Dave is her husband-to-be, switches cards with the shanghaied Mary and tells Brownie all. Inside the office, Van Luden tells Dave that American detectives are looking for him, giving him his wanted poster.

The women are then brought in to be matched with their husbands, and Van Luden thinks innocent Mary is for him. Mame tells him otherwise, and Van Luden rejects her. Dave decides to send Mary back, but changes his mind and marries her along with the others.

At the wedding reception, Van Luden learns he's been deceived and has his henchman, Castro (Fred Malatesta), trick Mary into his bedroom. As he tries to rape her, Mame hears her screams and awakens Dave, who rescues her.

Brownie, falling for Mame, offers her his room in Dave's house. Van Luden, as revenge, sends for the American detectives to take Dave and Brownie away. Dave learns of Mary's true plight, and she his, as they genuinely become man and wife.

Meanwhile, Brownie proposes to Mame, giving her a fifteen-carat raw diamond as an engagement gift. Dave tells Van Luden that he and Mary are leaving on the next boat and asks for his $250,000 share of the mine. Van Luden agrees, knowing the detectives will be on that boat. While Mataeo celebrates her eighteenth birthday with a new dress and hairdo, courtesy of Mame and Mary, Van Luden tricks her into his bedroom, then rapes and kills her. The next day, the natives bring Mataeo's body back from the swamps to her father, who discovers cloth from Van Luden's bed in her hand.

As the detectives prepare to take Dave and Brownie away, Doc (Harvey Clark), Mateo’s father, arrives and kills Van Luden.

Dave gives the detectives the $150,000 he had embezzled, plus the reward money. Brownie, his new partner in the mine, is told to sell the mine, and he hopes Dave can get him probation as well, as "a wedding gift."

As they leave for America, Mame asks Dave and Mary to send her "a baby buggy with bumpers."

The film concludes with the couples anticipating their new life together.

== Cast ==
- Dorothy Mackaill as Mame Smith
- Regis Toomey as Dave Hart
- Alan Hale as Von Luden
- Dorothy Libaire as Mary Lee
- Mae Busch as Gwen - British Bride
- Gladys Ahern as Laoma
- Fred Malatesta as Castro
- Viva Tattersall as Lena - European Bride
- Al Hill (actor) as Steve
- Michael Visaroff as Pete
- Brooks Benedict as Joe
- Franklin Parker as Bill
- Larry McGrath as Tom
- Harvey Clark as Doc Rogers
- Will Ahern as Brownie Brown
- Mary Kornman as Mataeo Rogers
- Esther Muir as Flo Lane
- Jimmy Aubrey as riverboat captain (uncredited)

== Crew ==
- Directed by - Phil Rosen
- Producer - M. H. Hoffman
- Associate producer - M. H. Hoffman, Jr.
- Screenplay and dialogue - Adele Buffington
- Cinematographer - Harry Neuman and Tom Galligan
- Production manager - Ray Culley
- Film editor - Mildred Johnston
- Art director - H. H. MacArthur
- Costumes by - Elizabeth Coleman
- Recorder - L. E. Clark

Other crew not on the film credits: Musical director - Abe Meyer and Assistant director - J. H. McCloskey
