= Herbert Bunston =

English actor

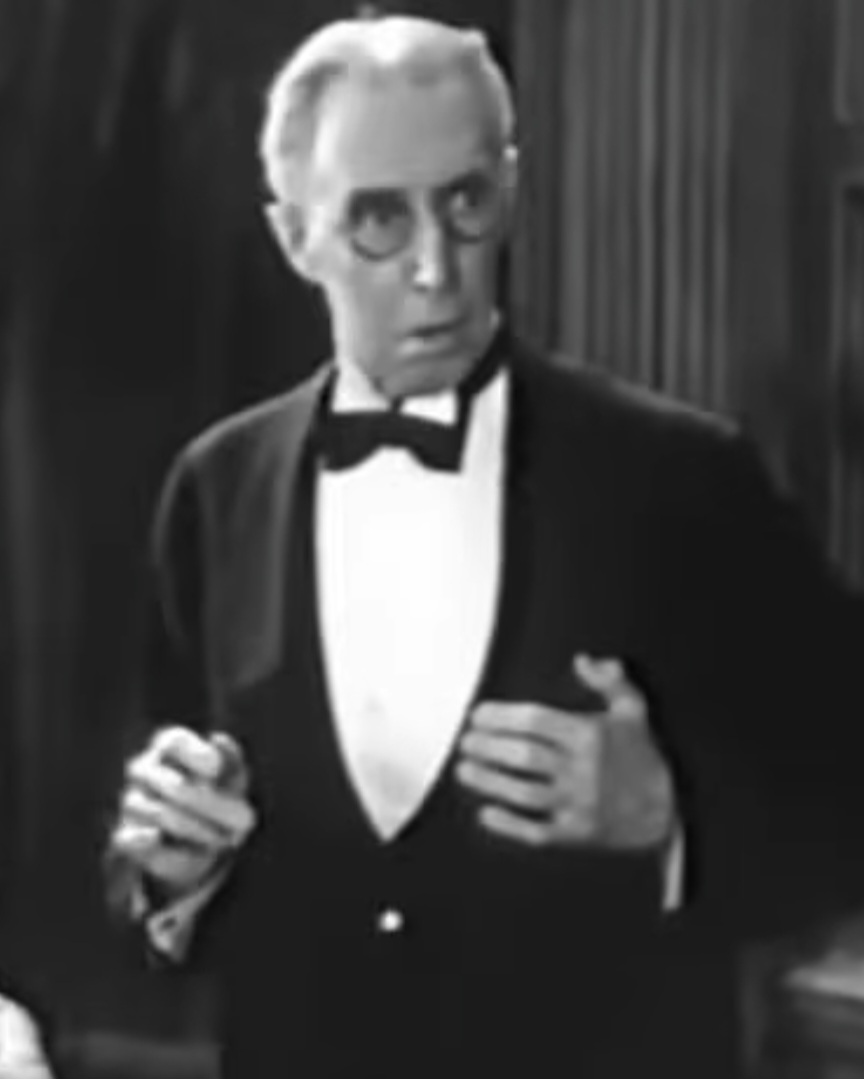
- Bunston in The Moonstone (1934)
- Born: 15 April 1874; Dorset, England, UK
- Died: 27 February 1935 (aged 60); Los Angeles, California, U.S.
- Occupation: Actor
- Years active: 1929–1935
- Spouse: Emily Fox Chaffey (1897-1935) (his death)
- Children: 2

Herbert Bunston (15 April 1874 – 27 February 1935) was an English stage and screen actor. He is remembered for his role as Dr. John Seward in the Broadway and film versions of Dracula.

Bunston was born in Charmouth and briefly attended Cranleigh School in Surrey. before working as an actor. Bunston emigrated to the United States in 1922. His first Broadway appearance was Arthur Wing Pinero's The Enchanted Cottage in 1923. Other short-running roles in That Awful Mrs. Eaton! and Simon Called Peter were followed by a critically noticed role in a run of 260 performances of 1925's Young Woodley. On 5 October 1927, Bunston debuted as Dr John Seward in a Broadway production of Dracula alongside Bela Lugosi.

Bunston's other Broadway credits include Young Woodley (1925), Simon Called Peter (1924), That Awful Mrs. Eaton (1924), The Enchanted Cottage (1923), and Drink (1903).

Bunston's stage success led to a contract with Metro-Goldwyn-Mayer. Between 1929 and 1935 he had mainly character roles in over 30 films, and 1931 he re-created his Broadway role in the film adaptation of Dracula. Bunston died of a heart attack in 1935.

Bunston married Emily Fox Chaffey (1866-1939) in 1898 and they had two children, Margaret, and John.

== Partial filmography ==
- The Last of Mrs. Cheyney (1929) – Lord Elton
- The Lady of Scandal (1930) – Lord Crayle
- Old English (1930) – Mr. Brownbee (uncredited)
- Under Suspicion (1930) – Maj. Manners
- Dracula (1931) – Doctor Seward
- Always Goodbye (1931) – Merson
- The Last Flight (1931) – Man on Train (uncredited)
- I Like Your Nerve (1931) – The Colonel (uncredited)
- Once a Lady (1931) – Roger Fenwick
- Ambassador Bill (1931) – British Ambassador
- Charlie Chan's Chance (1932) – Garrick Enderly
- File 113 (1932) – Fauvel
- Vanity Fair (1932) – Mr. Sedley
- Almost Married (1932) – Lord Laverling (uncredited)
- Smilin' Through (1932) – Minister (uncredited)
- The Monkey's Paw (1933) – Sampson
- Trick for Trick (1933) – Professor King (uncredited)
- Long Lost Father (1934) – The Bishop
- Gambling Lady (1934) – Doctor at Party (uncredited)
- Riptide (1934) – Maj. Bagdall (uncredited)
- Dr. Monica (1934) – Mr. Pettinghill
- The Moonstone (1934) – Sir John Verinder
- The Age of Innocence (1934) – W.J. Letterblair (uncredited)
- Desirable (1934) – Uncle Fred (uncredited)
- British Agent (1934) – First Cabinet Member (uncredited)
- The Richest Girl in the World (1934) – Cavendish
- The Little Minister (1934) – Mr. Carfrae
- Clive of India (1935) – First Director (uncredited)
- A Shot in the Dark (1935) – College President
- After Office Hours (1935) – Barlow – Norwood's Butler
- Les Misérables (1935) – Judge at Favorelles (uncredited)
- Cardinal Richelieu (1935) – Duke of Normandy (final film role)
