= Charlie Chan in Reno =

1939 film by Norman Foster

- Directed by: Norman Foster
- Screenplay by: Frances Hyland; Robert E. Kent; Albert Ray
- Based on: "Death Makes a Decree" by Philip Wylie
- Produced by: John Stone
- Starring: Sidney Toler
- Cinematography: Virgil Miller
- Edited by: Fred Allen
- Music by: Samuel Kaylin
- Production company: 20th Century Fox
- Distributed by: 20th Century Fox
- Release date: June 16, 1939
- Running time: 71 minutes
- Country: United States
- Language: English

Charlie Chan in Reno is a 1939 American mystery film directed by Norman Foster, starring Sidney Toler as the fictional Chinese-American detective Charlie Chan, based on an original story "Death Makes a Decree" by Philip Wylie.

== Plot ==
Mary Whitman has arrived in Reno to obtain a divorce. While there, she is arrested on suspicion of murdering a fellow guest at her hotel (which specializes in divorcees).

There are many others at the hotel who wanted the victim out of the way. Charlie Chan travels from his home in Honolulu to Reno to solve the murder at the request of Mary's soon-to-be ex-husband. On arrival in Reno, Chan spars pleasantly with Sheriff Tombstone Fletcher, an old-timer who isn't up-to-date on modern police methods.

No. 2 Son Jimmy Chan's part in the case gets off to a rocky start. Driving to Reno to meet his father, he picks up some "friendly" hitch-hikers who steal his car, strip him to his underwear, and abandon him in the middle of nowhere. He is picked up for vagrancy, and his father first encounters him in a police lineup.

But Jimmy's friendship with a Chinese maid at the hotel later proves invaluable. Choy Wong had hidden a carpet burn in the murder room, fearing she would be discharged for carelessness. But it develops the burn is an unusual one caused by acid. Charlie exposes the murderer by revealing an acid burn on the arm that had been hidden by unfashionably long sleeves.

Chan also exposes the "respectable" Dr. Ainsley as having "medically murdered" Mrs. Russell's late husband in 1936, hoping to have her for himself. Chan prevents his attempted poisoning of Mrs.Russell to cover his tracks and takes him into custody.

== Cast ==
- Sidney Toler as Charlie Chan
- Victor Sen Yung as Jimmy Chan ("Number 2 son")
- Ricardo Cortez as Dr. Ainsley
- Phyllis Brooks as Vivian Wells
- Slim Summerville as Sheriff Tombstone Fletcher
- Kane Richmond as Curtis Whitman
- Pauline Moore as Mary Whitman (Mrs. Curtis Whitman)
- Iris Wong as Choy Wong
- Eddie Collins as Cab Driver
- Robert Lowery as Walter Burke
- Charles D. Brown as Chief of Police King
- Louise Henry as Jeanne Bently
- Morgan Conway as George Bently
- Kay Linaker as Mrs. Russell

== Critical reception ==
Describing the Charlie Chan films as a "seemingly endless series" with "a certain monotony about [the] final tableaux," film critic Frank Nugent wrote in The New York Times that although "the divorce colony provides a new backdrop, the props are unchanged and the routine is the same," and reported that the film is "a passable little who-dunnit which you can [...] solve by dismissing all the folks who look guilty and selecting the one you're sure is innocent."
