= The She-Wolf (1931 film) =

1931 film

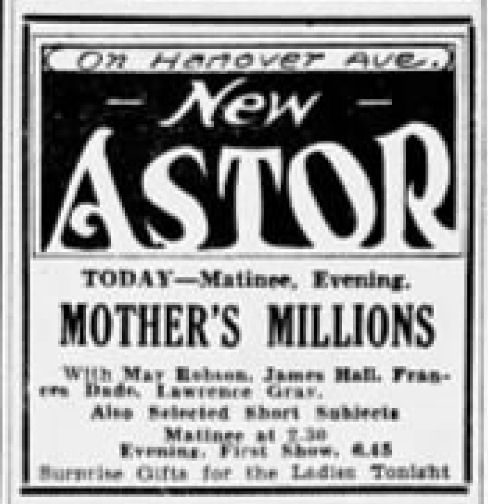
- Newspaper advertisement using the alternative title
- Directed by: James Flood
- Written by: Winifred Dunn; Gene Lewis
- Based on: Mother's Millions by Howard McKent Barnes
- Produced by: Herbert M. Gumbin; M.H. Hoffman
- Starring: May Robson; James Hall; Lawrence Gray
- Cinematography: Ernest Miller
- Edited by: W. Donn Hayes
- Production company: Liberty Pictures
- Distributed by: Universal Pictures
- Release date: May 1, 1931
- Running time: 85 minutes
- Country: United States
- Language: English

The She-Wolf is a 1931 American pre-Code drama film directed by James Flood and starring May Robson, James Hall, and Lawrence Gray. It is also known by the alternative title Mother's Millions.

== Cast ==
- May Robson as Harriet Breen
- James Hall as David Talbot
- Lawrence Gray as Tom Breen
- Frances Dade as Faire Breen
- Edmund Breese as William Remington
- Lillian Harmer as Maria Peppy
- Leah Winslow as Mrs. Talbot
- Elinor Flynn as Peggy
- William L. Thorne as Detective Burke
- Wilson Benge as Remington's Butler (uncredited)
- Frank Darien as Remington's Associate (uncredited)

== Bibliography ==
- Darby, William. Masters of Lens and Light: A Checklist of Major Cinematographers and Their Feature Films. Scarecrow Press, 1991.
