= The Intruder (1933 film) =

1933 film

- Directed by: Albert Ray
- Written by: Frances Hyland
- Produced by: M.H. Hoffman; M. H. Hoffman Jr.
- Starring: Monte Blue; Lila Lee; Gwen Lee
- Cinematography: Tom Galligan; Harry Neumann
- Edited by: Mildred Johnston
- Music by: Abe Meyer
- Production company: Allied Pictures
- Distributed by: Allied Pictures
- Release date: March 13, 1933
- Running time: 66 minutes
- Country: United States
- Language: English

The Intruder is a 1933 Pre code comedy crime film directed by Albert Ray and starring Monte Blue and Lila Lee, two silent screen veterans. The cast also featured Gwen Lee, Arthur Housman and Mischa Auer. Shot at the RKO-Pathé Studios in California, it was produced and distributed by the Poverty Row studio Allied Pictures. The picture survives in the Library of Congress collection.

== Plot ==
When one of the passengers is murdered on a ship during a tropical storm, a man named Samson declares himself to be a police detective from San Francisco takes over the investigation. This is interrupted when the ship is wrecked and the passengers and crew are forced to take shelter on a seemingly deserted island. Further deaths and unexplained events take place before they are rescued by a French ship.

== Cast ==
- Monte Blue as Jack Brandt
- Lila Lee as Connie Wayne
- Gwen Lee as Daisy
- Arthur Housman as Reggie Wayne
- Mischa Auer as Wild Man
- Harry Cording as Cramer
- William B. Davidson as Samson
- Wilfred Lucas as Mr. Wayne
- Sidney Bracey as Carlo, The Valet
- Lynton Brent as Purser
- Jack Beek as Hanson
- Allen Cavan as Captain Rush
- Gordon De Main as Doctor
- Grace Hayle as Ship Passenger

== Bibliography ==
- Pitts, Michael R. Poverty Row Studios, 1929–1940. McFarland & Company, 2005.
