= William Janney =

American actor

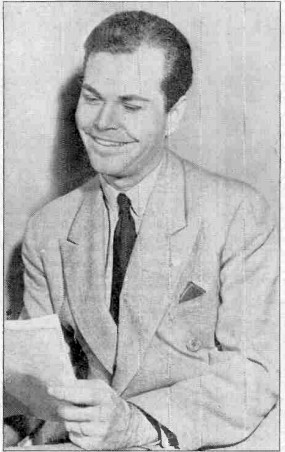
- Janney as shown in the November 26, 1938, issue of Radio Guide
- Born: February 15, 1908; New York City, New York, U.S.
- Died: December 22, 1992 (aged 84); Idaho, U.S.
- Occupations: Film and stage actor
- Years active: 1922–1937
- Spouse(s): Madlyn Hobbs (1940–1968; her death); Venice Daniels (1970–1989; her death)

William Janney (born Russell Dixon Janney, February 15, 1908 – December 22, 1992) was an American actor who appeared in 39 films between 1929 and 1937.

== Biography ==
He was the son of author and theatrical producer Russell Janney, and he attended the School for Professional Children.

Janney debuted on Broadway in Merton of the Movies (1922). His other Broadway credits include Great Music (1924) Four O'Clock (1933), Take My Tip (1932), Tommy (1927), and Bridge of Distances (1925).

His biggest regret was not taking the role in Tol'able David (1930) after Columbia boss Harry Cohn offered it to him. His mother urged him to let Richard Cromwell have it. "She told me there was this old woman friend of hers whose son had always wanted to play the part. She said I didn't want to play it anyway. To this day, I don't understand her... This really spoiled the whole thing for me, because I might have been offered a contract with Columbia. As it turned out, I never did get a contract, and Harry Cohn never offered me anything else."

Janney may be best remember for playing Hoppy's brother in Hopalong Cassidy Returns (1936). It is the only film that Hoppy's brother appeared in. A few films later, in North of the Rio Grande, it is mentioned that Hoppy's brother had been killed off.

== Complete filmography ==
- Coquette (1929) - Jimmy Besant
- Salute (1929) - Midshipman Paul Randall
- Mexicali Rose (1929) - Bob Manning
- The Girl Said No (1930) - Jimmie Ward
- Those Who Dance (1930) - Tim Brady
- Young Desire (1930) - Bobby Spencer
- The Dawn Patrol (1930) - Gordon Scott
- Shooting Straight (1930) - Tommy Powell
- The Pay-Off (1930) - Tommy Brown
- Cimarron (1931) - Man Phoning Ambulance (uncredited)
- The Right of Way (1931) - Billy Wantage
- Girls Demand Excitement (1931) - Freddie
- Parents Wanted (1931, Short)
- Meet the Wife (1931) - Gregory Brown
- The Man Who Played God (1932) - First Boy
- The Mouthpiece (1932) - John 'Johnny' Morris
- Two Seconds (1932) - College Boy at Execution
- Crooner (1932) - Pat - Band Member
- A Successful Calamity (1932) - Eddie Wilton
- Under-Cover Man (1932) - Jimmy Madigan
- The Iron Master (1933) - David Stillman
- The Crime of the Century (1933) - Jim Brandt
- Terror Aboard (1933) - Edward Wilson
- Secret of the Blue Room (1933) - Thomas Brandt
- King of the Wild Horses (1933) - Two Feathers
- The World Changes (1933) - Orin Nordholm III
- Should Ladies Behave (1933) - Geoffrey Cole
- As the Earth Turns (1934) - Ollie
- A Modern Hero (1934) - Young Pierre Croy
- A Successful Failure (1934) - Robert Cushing
- Sweepstake Annie (1935) - Arthur Foster
- The Great Hotel Murder (1935) - Harry Prentice
- Without Children (1935) - David Sonny Cole Jr.
- Born to Gamble (1935) - Fred Mathews
- Bonnie Scotland (1935) - Allan Douglas
- Sutter's Gold (1936) - John Sutter Jr.
- Sitting on the Moon (1936) - Young Husband
- Hopalong Cassidy Returns (1936) - Buddy Cassidy
- Clipped Wings (1937) - Mickey Lofton (final film role)
