= File 113 =

1933 film

- Directed by: Chester Franklin
- Written by: Émile Gaboriau (story); Jack Natteford
- Produced by: M.H. Hoffman
- Starring: Lew Cody; Mary Nolan; June Clyde
- Cinematography: Tom Galligan; Harry Neumann
- Production company: Allied Pictures
- Distributed by: Allied Pictures
- Release date: January 5, 1933
- Running time: 53 minutes
- Country: United States
- Language: English

File 113 is a 1933 American pre-Code mystery film directed by Chester Franklin and starring Lew Cody, Mary Nolan and June Clyde. Monsieur Lecoq, a Parisian detective solves a series of crimes. It is based on a story by the nineteenth century French writer Émile Gaboriau.

== Cast ==
- Lew Cody as M. Gaston Le Coq
- Mary Nolan as Mlle. Adoree
- Clara Kimball Young as Mme. Fauvel
- George E. Stone as Verduet
- William Collier Jr. as Prosper Botomy
- June Clyde as Madeline
- Herbert Bunston as Fauvel
- Roy D'Arcy as De Clameran
- Irving Bacon as Lagors
- Harry Cording as Michele
- Crauford Kent as Ottoman

== Bibliography ==
- Pitts, Michael R. Poverty Row Studios, 1929–1940: An Illustrated History of 55 Independent Film Companies, with a Filmography for Each. McFarland & Company, 2005.
