= Frances Hyland (screenwriter) =

American screenwriter

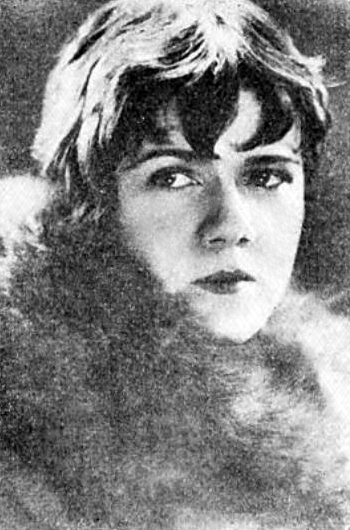
- Born: Frances Christine Moore; September 19, 1903; Stuttgart, Arkansas, US
- Occupation: Screenwriter
- Spouse: Albert Ray (died 1944)
- Parents: William Carol Moore (father); Aura Lee Dickey (mother)

Frances Hyland (born Frances Christine Moore, September 19, 1903; date of death unknown) was an American screenwriter active between the late 1920s and the late 1940s. She was the first woman hired as a "gagman" at a film studio, and she wrote dozens of comedic scripts over the course of her career.

== Biography ==
Hyland was born in Stuttgart, Arkansas on September 19, 1903, the daughter of William Carol Moore and Aura Lee Dickey. Her father was the editor of the local newspaper; he would later move to California and edit The Hueneme Harbor Bulletin.

In 1926, she became the first woman to be hired by Universal as a "gagman" (comedy writer). She later worked for Tiffany Pictures. She continued to work steadily throughout the 1930s and 1940s, producing scripts for well-received films like The Sin of Nora Moran, A Shriek in the Night, and In Old California.

She was married to filmmaker Albert Ray until his death and had 2 sons. Her date of death and final resting place are unknown.

== Selected filmography ==
- Women's Wares (1927)
- The House of Scandal (1928)
- The Grain of Dust (1928)
- The Power of Silence (1928)
- Marriage by Contract (1928)
- Painted Faces (1929)
- The Voice Within (1929)
- Two Men and a Maid (1929)
- Morals for Women (1931)
- Deceit (1932)
- The Thirteenth Guest (1932)
- Guilty or Not Guilty (1932)
- Officer Thirteen (1932)
- The Intruder (1933)
- A Shriek in the Night (1933)
- The Sin of Nora Morgan (1933)
- A Woman's Man (1934)
- Money Means Nothing (1934)
- Helldorado (1935)
- Smart Girl (1935)
- Thunder in the Night (1935)
- My Marriage (1936)
- The Crime of Dr. Forbes (1936)
- Star for a Night (1936)
- Under Your Spell (1936)
- 45 Fathers (1937)
- City Girl (1938)
- Island in the Sky (1938)
- Keep Smiling (1938)
- Everybody's Baby (1939)
- Winner Take All (1939)
- Charlie Chan in Reno (1939)
- The Cisco Kid and the Lady (1939)
- Free, Blonde and 21 (1940)
- Girl from Avenue A (1940)
- You're Telling Me (1942)
- In Old California (1942)
- Someone to Remember (1943)
- The Cheaters (1945)
- Murder in the Music Hall (1946)
- In Old Sacramento (1946)
