= West of Singapore =

1933 film directed by Albert Ray

- Directed by: Albert Ray
- Written by: Houston Branch; Adele Buffington; Elizabeth Meehan
- Produced by: Trem Carr; M.H. Hoffman
- Starring: Betty Compson; Weldon Heyburn; Margaret Lindsay
- Cinematography: Robert E. Cline; Harry Neumann
- Edited by: Carl Pierson
- Production company: Monogram Pictures
- Distributed by: Monogram Pictures
- Release date: January 31, 1933
- Running time: 65 minutes
- Country: United States
- Language: English

West of Singapore is a 1933 American pre-Code drama film directed by Albert Ray and starring Betty Compson, Weldon Heyburn and Margaret Lindsay.

== Plot ==
A man succumbs to the temptations of a disreputable tramp due to the intense tropical heat, causing difficulties for the woman who loves him.

== Cast ==
- Betty Compson as Lou
- Weldon Heyburn as Dan Manton
- Margaret Lindsay as Shelby Worrell
- Noel Madison as Degama
- Tom Douglas as Glenn Worrell
- Clyde Cook as Ricky
- Harvey Clark as Scrub
- Ernie Adams as Watson

== Preservation status ==
The film was considered to be a lost film until March 21, 2025 when a 2 minute fragment of the film was rediscovered and uploaded to YouTube.

== See also ==
- List of incomplete or partially lost films

== Bibliography ==
- Doherty, Thomas. Pre-Code Hollywood: Sex, Immorality, and Insurrection in American Cinema, 1930-1934. Columbia University Press, 1999.
