= Without Children =

1935 film directed by William Nigh

- Directed by: William Nigh
- Written by: Gertrude Orr; Nancy Mann Waddel Woodrow (story)
- Produced by: M.H. Hoffman
- Starring: Marguerite Churchill, Bruce Cabot; Evelyn Brent; Reginald Denny
- Cinematography: Harry Neumann
- Edited by: Mildred Johnston
- Music by: Abe Meyer
- Production company: Liberty Pictures
- Distributed by: Liberty Pictures
- Release date: April 15, 1935
- Running time: 85 minutes
- Country: United States
- Language: English

Without Children, also known as Penthouse Party, is a 1935 American drama film directed by William Nigh and starring Marguerite Churchill, Bruce Cabot and Evelyn Brent.

== Cast ==
- Marguerite Churchill as Sue Cole
- Bruce Cabot as David F. Cole
- Evelyn Brent as Shirley Ross Cole
- Reginald Denny as Phil Graham
- Dorothy Lee as Carol Cole
- William Janney as David Sonny Cole Jr.
- Dickie Moore as David Sonny Cole Jr. as a Child
- Cora Sue Collins as Carol Cole as a Child
- Lillian Harmer as Frieda
- Joan Woodbury as Secretary

== Bibliography ==
- Pitts, Michael R. Poverty Row Studios, 1929–1940: An Illustrated History of 55 Independent Film Companies, with a Filmography for Each. McFarland & Company, 2005.
