= King of the Sierras =

1938 film

- Directed by: Samuel Diege; Arthur Rosson
- Written by: Scott Darling (screenplay); Paul Franklin (additional dialogue); Frank Gay (story); Arthur Hoerl (additional dialogue)
- Produced by: George A. Hirliman (producer); M.H. Hoffman Jr. (associate producer); M.H. Hoffman (producer)
- Starring: Hobart Bosworth
- Cinematography: Tom Galligan; Jack Greenhalgh
- Edited by: Dan Milner; Carl Pierson
- Music by: Hugo Riesenfeld
- Distributed by: Grand National Pictures
- Release date: December 1938
- Running time: 53 minutes
- Country: United States
- Language: English

King of the Sierras is a 1938 American western directed by Samuel Diege and Arthur Rosson and distributed by Grand National Pictures.

The film is also known as Black Stallion (alternative American title) and Killers of the Prairie in the United Kingdom.

== Cast ==
- Hobart Bosworth as Uncle Hank
- Rex as El Diablo
- Harry Harvey Jr. as Tom
- Frank Campeau as Jim
- Harry Harvey as Pete
- Jack Lindell as The Trainer

== Soundtrack ==
- "Cactus Valley" (Words and Music by Lew Porter)
- "I Want to Be a Buckaroo" (Words and Music by Lew Porter)
- "King of the Sierras" (Written by Jimmy Franklin and Bobby Burns)
