= The Stoker (1932 film) =

1932 film

- Directed by: Chester M. Franklin
- Written by: F. Hugh Herbert (writer); Peter B. Kyne (story)
- Produced by: M.H. Hoffman Jr. (associate producer); M.H. Hoffman (producer)
- Cinematography: Tom Galligan; Harry Neumann
- Edited by: Mildred Johnston
- Production company: Allied Pictures
- Release date: June 15, 1932
- Running time: 70 minutes
- Country: United States
- Language: English

The Stoker is a 1932 American film directed by Chester M. Franklin.

== Plot summary ==
A man whose wife has deserted him winds up saving a beautiful girl from the clutches of a murderous bandit on a Nicaraguan coffee plantation.

== Cast ==
- Monte Blue as Dick Martin
- Dorothy Burgess as Margarita Valdez
- Noah Beery as Santini
- Natalie Moorhead as Vera Martin
- Richard Tucker as Alan Ballard
- Clarence Geldart as Senor Valdez
- Charles Stevens as Ernesto
- Harry J. Vejar as Jailer
- Chris-Pin Martin as Chief of Police

== Production ==
The film was completed in just 8 days, finishing in May 1932.
