= One Year Later (film) =

1933 American film directed by E. Mason Hopper

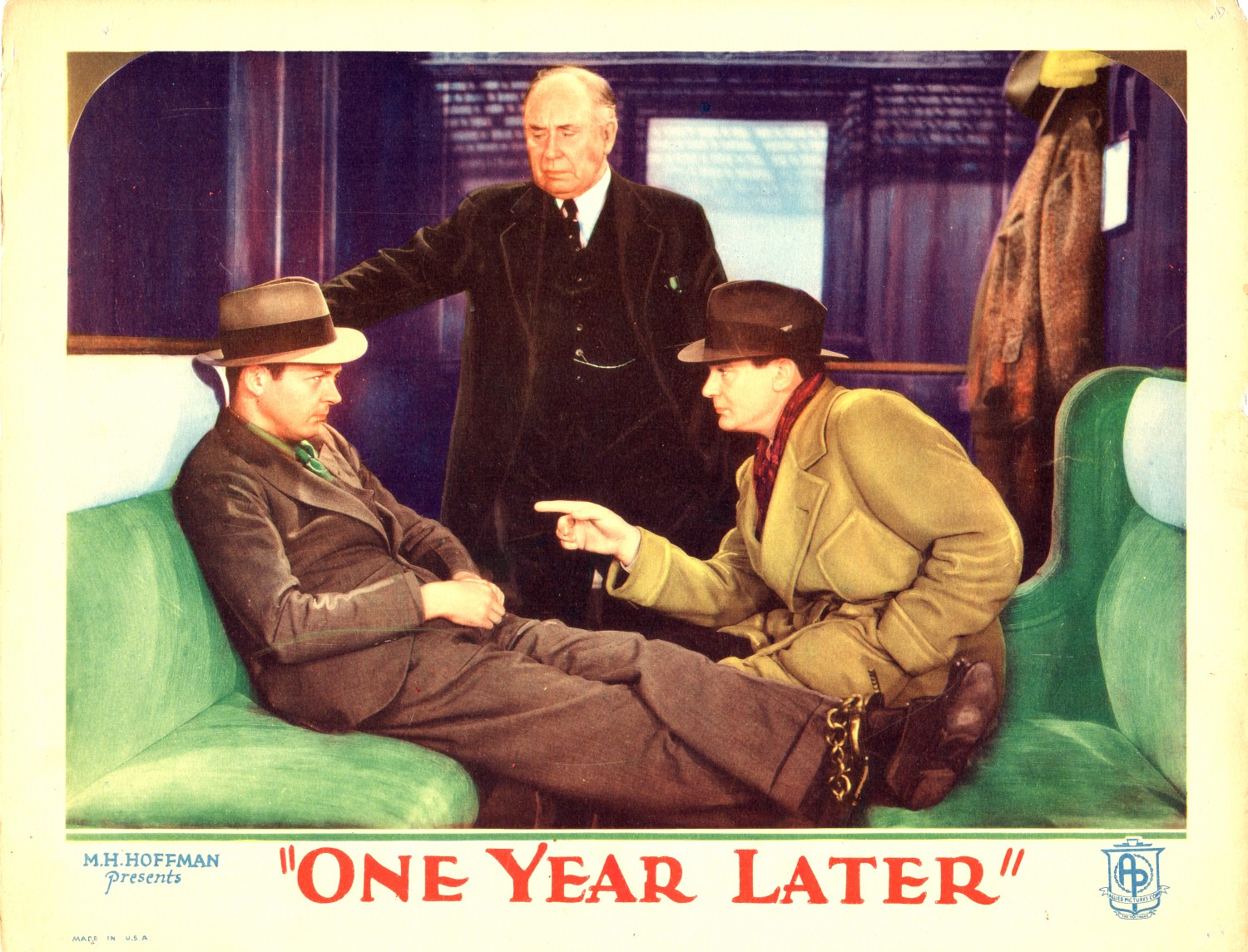
- Lobby card
- Directed by: E. Mason Hopper
- Story by: F. Hugh Herbert; Paul Perez
- Produced by: M.H. Hoffman
- Starring: Mary Brian; Russell Hopton; Don Dillaway
- Cinematography: Faxon M. Dean; Tom Galligan
- Edited by: Mildred Johnston
- Production company: Allied Pictures
- Release date: 1933
- Running time: 69 minutes
- Country: United States
- Language: English

One Year Later is a 1933 American crime thriller directed by E. Mason Hopper starring Mary Brian, Russell Hopton and Don Dillaway.

== Plot summary ==
The film opens with Jim and Molly Collins, a blissful honeymooning couple, traveling by train. A year later, the same train car that carried the couple on their honeymoon is carrying Jim to be electrocuted on New Year's Eve. He was found guilty of killing his boss, whom he suspected of having an affair with Molly. Flashbacks tell the real story behind Jim's conviction. Several contrasting stories of other train passengers play out as Jim and Molly's story rushes to its climax. Although it seems hopeless, two wild cards are on board: Jim's wife and a terminally ill reporter.

== Review ==
The Showmen Reviews section of the Motion Picture Herald notes, "No exhibitor, big or little, should worry as to the entertainment or box office value of One Year Later. The fact that it brought from the preview audience a burst of appreciative applause is an almost sure indication that the show should click. Its cast, with well-known players in bit parts, answers the demand for names."

Produces as an independent, low-budget, eight-reel B movie, One Year Later featured an ensemble cast of established actors.

The National Board of Review passed the film. Copyright 9 Aug 33 LP4094.

== Cast ==
- Mary Brian as Molly Collins
- Russell Hopton as Tony Richards
- Don Dillaway as Jim Collins
- DeWitt Jennings as Deputy Russell
- Will Ahern as Will Carewe
- Gladys Ahern as Joyce Carewe
- George Irving as J. Atwell Hunt
- Jackie Searl as Clarence
- Pauline Garon as Vera Marks
- William Humphrey as train conductor
- Harry Holman as fat man
- Marjorie Beebe as news stand girl
- Herbert Evans as the Englishman

The Internet Movie Database (IMDb) lists 18 uncredited cast members, including three particularly notable actors: Walter Brennan as Yokel, Blue Washington as the train porter, and Tom London as the taxicab driver. Brennan went on to win three Oscars for Best Supporting Actor. Blue Washington, an actor and baseball player in the Negro leagues, appeared in over 70 films, mostly playing uncredited roles as a porter, a bartender, an African native, a cook, a chauffeur, and a doorman. Tom London appeared in anywhere from over 600 to upwards of 2,000 films, earning him recognition in records like the Guinness Book of World Records for appearing in more films than almost any other actor in Hollywood history.

== Crew ==
- Story and screenplay by: F. Hugh Herbert
- Story by Paul Perez
- Additional dialogue: Will Ahern
- Production manager: Ray Culley
- Cinematography: Faxon Dean and Tom Galligan (cinematographer)
- Film editor: Mildred Johnston
- Recorder: Pete Clark
- Directed by: E. Mason Hopper
