= Otto Brower =

American film director

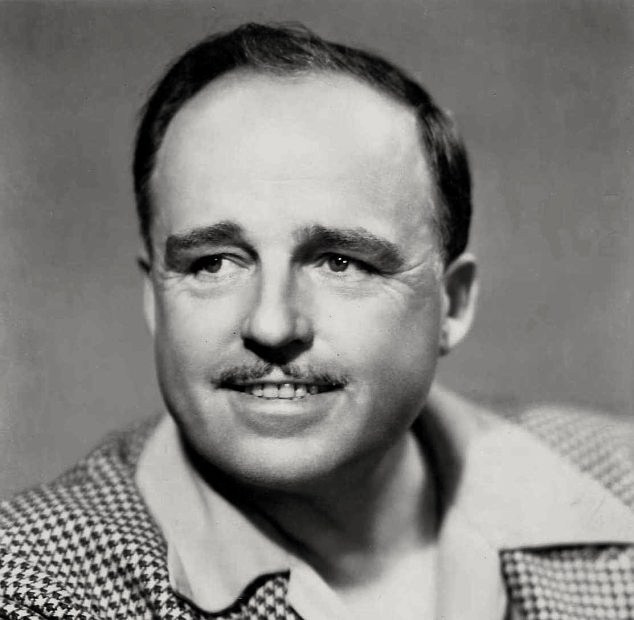
- Born: December 2, 1890; Grand Rapids, Michigan
- Died: January 25, 1946 (aged 55); Hollywood, California
- Occupation: Film director
- Years active: 1928–1946

Otto Brower (December 2, 1890 – January 25, 1946) was an American film director. He directed more than 40 films between 1928 and 1946. He was born in Grand Rapids, Michigan, and died in Hollywood, California, from a heart attack.

== Filmography ==
- On the High Seas (1922) (actor)
- Avalanche (1928)
- Sunset Pass (1929)
- Stairs of Sand (1929)
- The Light of Western Stars (1930)
- Paramount on Parade (1930) co-director with ten other Paramount directors
- The Border Legion (1930)
- The Santa Fe Trail (1930)
- Clearing the Range (1931)
- Pleasure (1931)
- Hard Hombre (1931)
- Law of the Sea (1931)
- Fighting Caravans (1931)
- The Local Bad Man (1932)
- Spirit of the West (1932)
- Fighting for Justice (1932)
- Gold (1932)
- The Devil Horse (1932)
- Scarlet River (1933)
- Cross Fire (1933)
- Headline Shooter (1933)
- Straightaway (1933)
- Speed Wings (1934)
- I Can't Escape (1934)
- Mystery Mountain (1934)
- The Phantom Empire (1935)
- The Outlaw Deputy (1935)
- Sins of Man (1936)
- Postal Inspector (1936)
- Speed to Burn (1938)
- Road Demon (1939)
- Winner Take All (1939)
- Stanley and Livingstone (1939) (safari)
- Stop, Look and Love (1939)
- Too Busy to Work (1939)
- Men with Steel Faces (archive footage) (1940)
- On Their Own (1940)
- Girl from Avenue A (1940)
- The Gay Caballero (1940)
- Youth Will Be Served (1940)
- Sex Hygiene (1942)
- Little Tokyo, U.S.A. (1942)
- Dixie Dugan (1943)
- Behind Green Lights (1946)
- Duel in the Sun (1946) (uncredited)
