= The Iron Master =

1933 film

- Directed by: Chester M. Franklin
- Written by: Adele Buffington
- Based on: The Ironmaster by Georges Ohnet
- Produced by: M.H. Hoffman
- Starring: Reginald Denny; Lila Lee; J. Farrell MacDonald
- Cinematography: Tom Galligan; Harry Neumann
- Edited by: Mildred Johnston
- Production company: M.H. Hoffman Inc.
- Distributed by: Allied Pictures
- Release date: February 4, 1933
- Running time: 64 minutes
- Country: United States
- Language: English

The Iron Master is a 1933 American drama film directed by Chester M. Franklin and starring Reginald Denny, Lila Lee and J. Farrell MacDonald. It was distributed by the independent Allied Pictures. It was adapted by Adele Buffington from the 1882 novel The Ironmaster by Georges Ohnet, with the setting changed to modern-day America. An earlier American adaptation was the 1917 silent film American Methods.

== Plot ==
Steve Mason, a worker firing at the Stillman iron foundry rebukes the owner's daughter Janet for reckless driving. Instead of firing him as she demands, Stillman promotes the young man. Eventually he rises to be a trusted employee, and when Stillman dies he leaves Mason in control of the business. He faces deep resentment from the old man's snobbish children, who conspire with a rival businessman to launch a takeover bid. Janet joins in at first, but has a change of heart as her feelings for Mason develop.

== Cast ==
- Reginald Denny as Steve Mason
- Lila Lee as Janet Stillman
- J. Farrell MacDonald as J.C. Stillman
- Esther Howard as Mrs. Stillman
- William Janney as David Stillman
- Virginia Sale as Miss Smith
- Richard Tucker as Paul Rankin
- Astrid Allwyn as Flo Lancert
- Tom London as Turner
- Nola Luxford as Diana
- Otto Hoffman as Grange

== Bibliography ==
- Fetrow, Alan G. Sound films, 1927-1939: a United States Filmography. McFarland, 1992.
- Pitts, Michael R. Poverty Row Studios, 1929–1940: An Illustrated History of 55 Independent Film Companies, with a Filmography for Each. McFarland & Company, 2005.
