= Lillian Harmer =

American character actress (1883–1946)

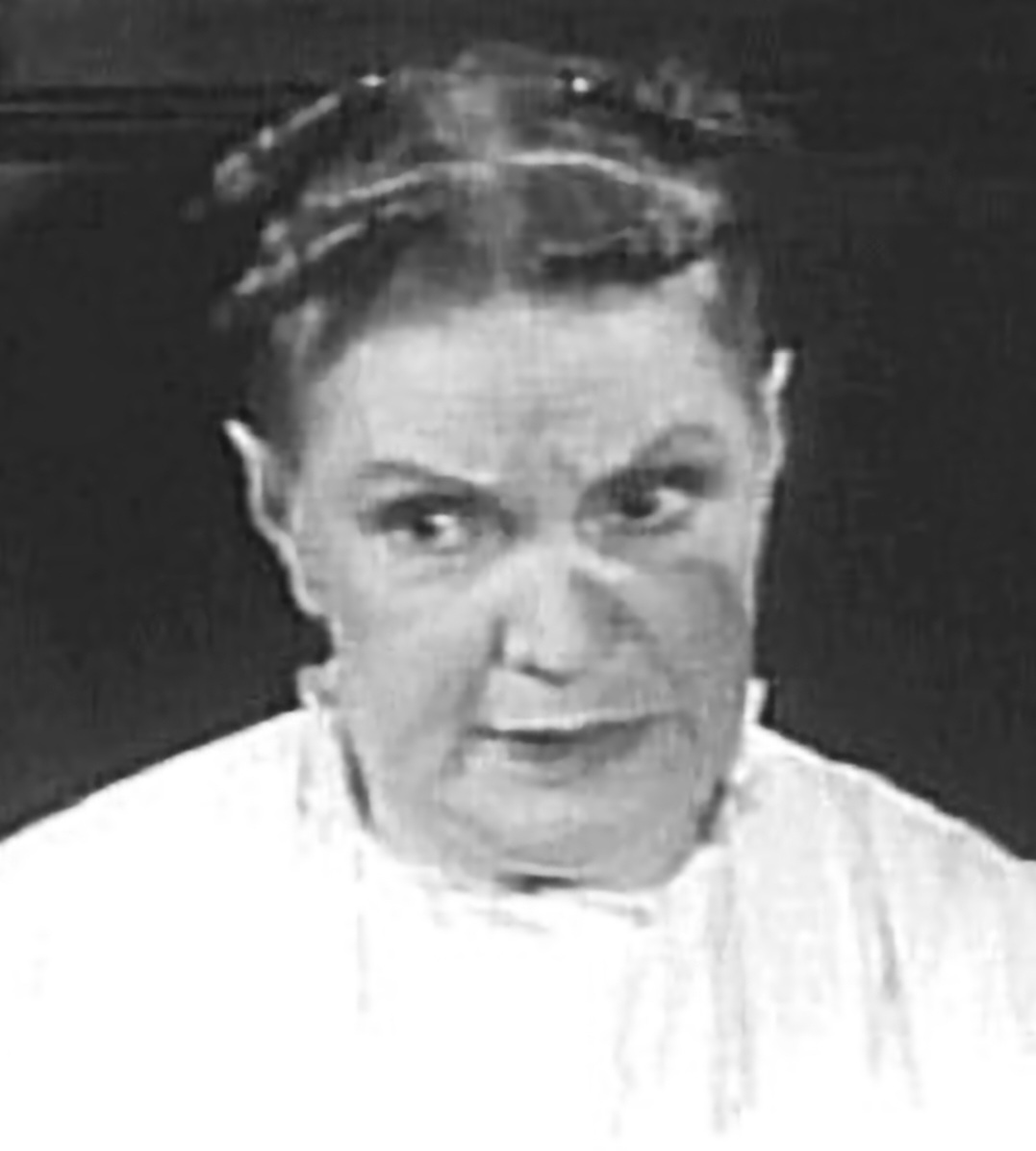
- Harmer in A Shriek in the Night (1933)
- Born: September 8, 1883; Philadelphia, Pennsylvania, U.S.
- Died: May 14, 1946 (aged 62); Los Angeles, California, U.S.
- Resting place: Forest Lawn Memorial Park, Glendale, California
- Occupation: Actress
- Years active: 1927–1938
- Spouse: Albert Frederick Kaeber

Lillian Harmer (September 8, 1883 – May 14, 1946) was an American character actress.

== Biography ==
Born in Philadelphia in 1883, Harmer had a brief film career during the 1930s. During her short career she would appear in over 60 films, mostly in uncredited roles. She would occasionally be cast in a featured supporting role, as in A Shriek in the Night (1933) and The Bowery (1933), in which she played the historical character of Carrie Nation.

Other notable films in which she appeared include: Huckleberry Finn (1931), starring Jackie Coogan as Tom Sawyer; the 1933 version of Alice in Wonderland; William Wellman's 1937 version of A Star is Born, starring Janet Gaynor, Fredric March, and Adolphe Menjou; the Ronald Colman vehicle, The Prisoner of Zenda; and the 1938 Cecil B. DeMille historical drama, The Buccaneer, starring Fredric March. Her final film appearance would be in a small role in 1938's Gateway, starring Don Ameche and Arleen Whelan.

Harmer, who was married to Albert Frederick Kaeber, died on May 14, 1946, and was buried in Forest Lawn Memorial Park in Glendale, California.

== Filmography ==
(Per AFI database)

- A Harp in Hock (1927)
- Huckleberry Finn (1931)
- Smart Woman (1931)
- The She-Wolf (1931)
- Guilty as Hell (1932)
- No Man of Her Own (1932) as Mattie, the Librarian (uncredited)
- New Morals for Old (1932)
- If I Had a Million (1932)
- Ann Vickers (1933)
- A Shriek in the Night (1933)
- Jennie Gerhardt (1933)
- Lone Cowboy (1933)
- Alice in Wonderland (1933)
- The Bowery (1933)
- Hold Your Man (1933) as Miss Allen (uncredited)
- Mandalay (1934)
- College Rhythm (1934)
- Spitfire (1934)
- Housewife (1934)
- Lady by Choice (1934)
- Desirable (1934)
- You Can't Buy Everything (1934)
- Romance in Manhattan (1935)
- Without Children (1935)
- The Big Broadcast of 1936 (1935)
- Personal Maid's Secret (1935)
- Party Wire (1935)
- Whipsaw (1935)
- Public Hero No. 1 (1935)
- Three Kids and a Queen (1935)
- Rainbow on the River (1936)
- The Captain's Kid (1936)
- Sworn Enemy (1936)
- Riffraff (1936)
- Little Miss Nobody (1936)
- Fugitive in the Sky (1936)
- Don't Get Personal (1936)
- Dancing Feet (1936)
- We Went to College (1936)
- Internes Can't Take Money (1937)
- Make a Wish (1937)
- A Star Is Born (1937) as Wardrobe Woman (uncredited)
- The Great O'Malley (1937) as Miss Taylor
- The Prisoner of Zenda (1937)
- The Buccaneer (1938)
- Gateway (1938)
