= The Local Bad Man =

1932 film

- Film poster
- Directed by: Otto Brower
- Written by: Peter B. Kyne (story); Philip Graham White (scenario)
- Produced by: M.H. Hoffman Jr.
- Starring: Hoot Gibson
- Cinematography: Tom Galligan; Harry Neumann
- Edited by: Mildred Johnston
- Production company: Allied Pictures
- Release date: January 15, 1932
- Running time: 59 minutes
- Country: United States
- Language: English

The Local Bad Man is a 1932 American pre-Code Western film directed by Otto Brower.

== Plot ==
This plot summary was published in The Movie Mirror.

You'll See: Hoot Gibson, Sally Blane, and a competent cast of "westerners."

It's About: How an honest ranch owner foils the dastardly villains who try to frame him for a train robbery.

The Locale: Them thar wide open spaces, stranger!

You know the hootgibson formula: Hoot is the golden-hearted feller who, somehow, gets suspected of all sorts of western hellishness because some cursed villains try to pin on him the guilt for their own crime. But does he foil 'em? Does he ...!!! And does he win the be-oo-tiful heroine ...? Does he ...!!!

== Cast ==
- Hoot Gibson as Jim Bonner
- Sally Blane as Marion Meade
- Hooper Atchley as Joe Murdock
- Edward Hearn as Ben Murdock
- Edward Peil Sr. as Sheriff Hickory
- Jack Clifford
- "Skeeter Bill" Robbins
- Milton Brown as "Horsetail" Wright
