= Born to Gamble =

1935 film by Phil Rosen

- Directed by: Phil Rosen
- Written by: Edgar Wallace (novel The Green Poropoulos); E. Morton Hough (continuity, dialogue and story)
- Produced by: M.H. Hoffman Jr. (associate producer); M.H. Hoffman (producer)
- Starring: See below
- Cinematography: Gilbert Warrenton
- Edited by: Mildred Johnston
- Production company: Liberty Pictures
- Distributed by: Republic Pictures
- Release date: July 10, 1935 (United States)
- Running time: 63 minutes
- Country: United States
- Language: English

Born to Gamble is a 1935 American film directed by Phil Rosen and released by Republic Pictures.

== Plot ==
Four brothers feel cursed by their family's gambling bug. All four try to overcome the addiction: only one, the youngest, is successful.

== Cast ==
- Onslow Stevens as Dan "Ace" Cartwright (prologue) & Henry Mathews
- H.B. Warner as Carter Mathews
- Maxine Doyle as Cora Strickland
- Eric Linden as Earl Mathews
- Lois Wilson as Paula Mathews
- William Janney as Fred Mathews
- Ben Alexander as Paul Mathews
- Lucien Prival as Al Shultz

== Reception ==
Variety wrote that "a sombre story is [a] handicap that might have been overcome with flawless treatment" and commented that, although the film improves towards the end, "by then it's swamped under a mass of interminable detail."
