= Cowboy Counsellor =

1932 film

- Directed by: George Melford
- Written by: Jack Natteford
- Produced by: M.H. Hoffman Jr.
- Starring: Hoot Gibson
- Cinematography: Tom Galligan; Harry Neumann
- Edited by: Mildred Johnston
- Distributed by: Allied Pictures
- Release date: October 15, 1932
- Running time: 62 minutes
- Country: United States
- Language: English

Cowboy Counsellor is a 1932 American Pre-Code Western film starring Hoot Gibson and directed by George Melford. It mixed in strong elements of comedy with courtroom drama. One reviewer deemed it "the best of Gibson's films for Allied."

== Plot ==
Dan Alton is a con artist, posing as a lawyer in order to sell copies of a phony law book. When Bill Clary robs a stagecoach, and plants some of the stolen money at the ranch of Luke Avery, Avery's sister beautiful sister Ruth ropes an instantly smitten Alton into being Avery's defense attorney. As part of his strategy to defend Avery, Alton plans to pull off another stagecoach robbery.

== Cast ==
- Hoot Gibson as Dan Alton
- Sheila Bromley as Ruth Avery
- Jack Rutherford as Bill Clary
- Skeeter Bill Robbins as Deputy Lafe Walters
- Al Bridge as Sheriff Matt Farraday
- Fred Gilman as Luke Avery
- Bobby Nelson as Bobby Avery
- William Humphrey as Judge Kendell
- Gordon De Main as Replaced by Lorch
- Merrill McCormick as Bearded Prisoner
- Sam Allen as Hotel Clerk
