= Dizzy Dames =

1935 film

- Directed by: William Nigh
- Screenplay by: George Waggner
- Based on: The Watch Dog by P. G. Wodehouse
- Produced by: M.H. Hoffman
- Starring: Marjorie Rambeau; Florine McKinney; Lawrence Gray; Inez Courtney; Berton Churchill; Fuzzy Knight
- Cinematography: Harry Neumann
- Edited by: Mildred Johnston
- Music by: Howard Jackson
- Production company: Liberty Pictures
- Distributed by: Liberty Pictures
- Release date: May 29, 1935
- Running time: 65 minutes
- Country: United States
- Language: English

Dizzy Dames is a 1935 American musical film directed by William Nigh and written by George Waggner. The film stars Marjorie Rambeau, Florine McKinney, Lawrence Gray, Inez Courtney, Berton Churchill and Fuzzy Knight. The film was released on May 29, 1935, by Liberty Pictures.

== Cast ==
- Marjorie Rambeau as Lillian Bennett / Lillian Marlowe
- Florine McKinney as Helen Bennett
- Lawrence Gray as Terry Ramsey
- Inez Courtney as Arlette
- Berton Churchill as Dad Hackett
- Fuzzy Knight as Buzz
- Kitty Kelly as La Vere
- Lillian Miles as Gloria Weston
- John Warburton as Rodney Stokes
- Mary Forbes as Mrs. Stokes
