= The Gay Buckaroo =

1932 film directed by Phil Rosen

- Directed by: Phil Rosen
- Screenplay by: Philip Graham White
- Story by: Lee R. Brown
- Produced by: M.H. Hoffman Jr.
- Starring: Hoot Gibson; Merna Kennedy; Roy D'Arcy
- Cinematography: Harry Neumann
- Edited by: Mildred Johnston
- Production company: Allied Pictures
- Distributed by: State Rights
- Release date: January 17, 1932 (US)
- Running time: 66 minutes
- Country: United States
- Language: English

The Gay Buckaroo is a 1932 American pre-Code Western film, directed by Phil Rosen. It stars Hoot Gibson, Merna Kennedy, and Roy D'Arcy, and was released on January 17, 1932.

== Plot ==
Cowboy Hale and gambler Dumont are both in love with Field. Initially she favors Dumont, but Hale reveals that Dumont is really a criminal, and Hale ends up victorious in romance.

== Cast ==
- Hoot Gibson as Clint Hale
- Merna Kennedy as Mildred Field
- Roy D'Arcy as Dave Dumont
- Edward Peil Sr. as Hi Low Jack
- Charles King as Faro Parker
- Lafe McKee as Sporty Bill Field
- Sydney de Grey as Uncle Abner
