= Vanity Fair (1932 film) =

1932 film

- Theatrical release poster
- Directed by: Chester M. Franklin
- Written by: F. Hugh Herbert
- Based on: Vanity Fair; 1848 novel by William Makepeace Thackeray
- Produced by: M. H. Hoffman
- Starring: Myrna Loy; Conway Tearle; Barbara Kent; Anthony Bushell
- Cinematography: Tom Galligan; Harry Neumann
- Edited by: Mildred Johnston
- Production company: Chester M. Franklin Productions
- Distributed by: Allied Pictures
- Release date: March 15, 1932
- Running time: 78 minutes
- Country: United States
- Language: English

Vanity Fair is a 1932 American pre-Code drama film directed by Chester M. Franklin and featuring Myrna Loy in her first starring role, Conway Tearle and Anthony Bushell. The film is a modernized adaptation of William Makepeace Thackeray's 1848 novel of the same name, with the original Regency-era story reset in twentieth century Britain. (Three years later Thackeray's novel was adapted again as Becky Sharp, the first three-strip Technicolor feature film.)

== Plot ==
Two women in their twenties are passengers in a limousine traveling down a road outside London: Amelia Sedley and her friend Becky Sharp. Amelia is from a rich, well-connected family, while Becky is from very modest means and has no family at all. Amelia has invited Becky to her home for Christmas.

At the Sedley estate, Amelia's family welcomes their guest, but the mother is soon wary of her. Becky aims to use her beauty and guile to gain wealth and privilege by climbing the social ladder. Her first target is Joseph, Amelia's much-older brother. After Becky tries unsuccessfully to trap him into marriage, Mrs. Sedley sees her cuddling in the home's drawing room with her daughter's fiancé, George Osborne. Disgusted, the mother advises Becky to leave immediately so she can begin the job she had accepted before the holidays, governess for the family of Sir Pitt Crawley. Becky departs.

Upon her arrival at the residence of Lord Crawley, Becky quickly stirs the passions of both the elderly Sir Pitt and his son Rawdon. She entices them with her suggestive comments and by allowing each man into her bedroom at night. Soon she and Rawdon begin a secretive affair, but Sir Pitt finally catches them together in Becky's bedroom. There they inform him they had married the previous day. That news enrages the old man, who orders his son and his "shameless little hussy" out of his house.

Relocating to a townhouse in London's Mayfair district, Becky and Rawdon feel the financial strains of being cut off from Lord Crawley's wealth. The couple at first brings in money by betting and cheating their friends playing bridge. That income, however, is insufficient, so Becky gets more money through blackmail and gifts from a string of lovers, including George Osborne, now Amelia's husband. Eventually, even Rawdon cannot tolerate his wife's behavior. On the evening he is released from police custody for writing bad checks, Rawdon finds Becky at their home with another lover. He declares their marriage is over and gives her only ten minutes to vacate the premises. As she leaves, he informs her that his father had just died, and he is now Lord Crawley. He then warns her that if she ever dares to refer to herself as "Lady Crawley," he will track her down and kill her.

Several years pass, and Becky lives in a far less affluent, largely French-speaking area of London. There she prowls the area's bars and casinos, getting money from the assorted men she meets. One evening in a casino, she sees Amelia's brother Joseph, who updates her about his sister's situation. While Becky knows that Amelia's husband George died five years earlier in a horse-riding accident, she learns that Amelia refuses to remarry. Subsequently she also learns that Amelia's mistaken belief in his fidelity have led her to refuse repeated proposals from Dobbin, a gentleman who has adored her for years. Becky invites Amelia to her apartment and confesses her affair with George. She then calls Amelia a fool for revering a dead "cad" and urges her to wed Dobbin, who is waiting outside. When Amelia rejoins him after Becky's disclosures, she rests her head on Dobbin's shoulder.

Becky's life becomes a daily struggle marked by petty crimes, prostitution, and meager funds. In the final scene Becky enters her shabby one-room apartment. Lying on the bed is Joseph, stirring from his latest binge. She addresses him as "my love" and informs him that his sister had just given her another check. He is infuriated and tells her never to accept money again from Amelia. Becky turns, sits at a dresser, and stares into its mirror. In the reflection she watches her face transform from its present haggard appearance to its former beauty. She then notices that Joseph has quietly departed. She also notices that he has torn up his sister's check, and in the dust on the bedside bureau he has written Finis ("The End"). Becky lowers her face into her hands and weeps.

== Cast ==
- Myrna Loy as Becky Sharp
- Conway Tearle as Rawdon Crawley
- Barbara Kent as Amelia Sedley
- Walter Byron as George Osborne
- Anthony Bushell as Dobbin
- Billy Bevan as Joseph Sedley
- Montagu Love as Marquis of Steyne
- Herbert Bunston as Mr. Sedley
- Mary Forbes as Mrs. Sedley
- Lionel Belmore as Sir Pitt Crawley
- Wild Bill Elliott as Minor Role (uncredited)
- Tom Ricketts as Parker (uncredited)

== Reception ==
Vanity Fair received largely negative reviews in 1932 from some of the film industry's leading trade publications. The critic for Variety could not recommend the film, finding its acting "competent" but the overall production poorly scripted and its direction deficient:

One of those independent productions which misses distinction because of a lack of finish. A modern dress version of Thackeray's famous chisler, with a competent player in the part and frequent good moments, poor photography, tepid direction and poor dialog ... However the theme will not appeal to the average filmgoer since it is seldom possible to hold interest in a story in which the heroine is not worthy ... Myrna Loy was an excellent choice for Becky. She plays the part with genuineness, looking as well as acting her assignment until the final sequence when the makeup obtrudes to suggest age and her fading charms ... The production lacks the gifted touch which welds components into a single structure.

The Film Daily was even more critical of the film than Variety. The subheading of its review summarized the film as being a "Dull Drama" and an "Uninteresting Adaptation of Classic Novel That Falls Flat". The influential publication found Conway Tearle's performance to be the only aspect of the production that was truly noteworthy:

Vanity Fair's slow tempo, English accents, and draggy direction does not help it any. Myrna Loy has the role of Becky Sharpe, and is alluring as usual. But her part is so unsympathetic and the string of gents she trims appear such boobs that there is no cause for the audience to get enthusiastic or vitally interested ... Conway Tearle is her main victim, and after going along for half the distance, suddenly drops out of the picture, and you never see or hear from him again. He is the only one who puts a real vital spark in his role. When he goes, the picture goes with him. From then on it is a dismal portrayal of Becky's gradual fall into poverty and misery. The ending is distinctly depressing.

== Home media ==
Vanity Fair was released on DVD by Alpha Video in 2006.
DVD or streaming videos of the film may carry the alternate title Indecent.

== See also ==
- Vanity Fair (1915)
- Vanity Fair (1923)
- Becky Sharp (1935)
