= The Eleventh Commandment (1933 film) =

1933 film

- Directed by: George Melford
- Written by: Brandon Fleming (play); Adele Buffington; Kurt Kempler
- Produced by: M.H. Hoffman
- Starring: Marian Marsh; Theodore von Eltz; Alan Hale
- Cinematography: Harry Neumann; Tom Galligan
- Edited by: Mildred Johnston
- Music by: Abe Meyer
- Production company: Allied Pictures
- Distributed by: Weiss Brothers
- Release date: March 25, 1933
- Running time: 68 minutes
- Country: United States
- Language: English

The Eleventh Commandment is a 1933 American pre-Code drama film directed by George Melford and starring Marian Marsh, Theodore von Eltz and Alan Hale. It is based on a play by Brandon Fleming. The story had previously been made into a 1924 British silent film.

== Plot ==
When a wealthy unmarried woman dies without heirs, her estate is entrusted to her attorney. However his partner at the law firm schemes to get his hands on the money and hires a barmaid to pretend to be a relative and claim the estate.

== Cast ==
- Marian Marsh as Corinne Ross
- Theodore von Eltz as Wayne Winters
- Alan Hale as Max Stäger
- Marie Prevost as Tessie Florin
- Gloria Shea as Nina
- Arthur Hoyt as Charlie Moore
- William V. Mong as John Ross
- Lee Moran as Steve
- Ethel Wales as Mabel Moore
- Lyman Williams as Jerry Trent
