= When Strangers Meet =

1934 American film directed by Christy Cabanne

- Theatrical poster
- Directed by: Christy Cabanne
- Produced by: Adele Buffington
- Starring: Richard Cromwell; Arline Judge; Lucien Littlefield
- Cinematography: Harry Neumann; Tom Galligan
- Edited by: Mildred Johnston
- Production company: Liberty Pictures
- Release date: July 20, 1934 (US)
- Running time: 7 reels
- Country: United States
- Language: English

When Strangers Meet is a 1934 American drama film directed by Christy Cabanne and starring Richard Cromwell, Arline Judge, and Lucien Littlefield. It was released on July 20, 1934.

== Cast ==
- Richard Cromwell as Paul Tarman
- Arline Judge as Ruth Crane
- Lucien Littlefield as Barney Crane
- Charles Middleton as John Tarman
- Hale Hamilton as Captain Manning
- Sarah Padden as Lucy Tarman
- Maude Eburne as Nell Peck
- Barbara Weeks as Elaine
- Sheila Terry as Dolly
- Ray Walker as Steve
