= A Parisian Romance (film) =

1932 film

- Directed by: Chester M. Franklin
- Written by: F. Hugh Herbert; Octave Feuillet (play)
- Produced by: M.H. Hoffman
- Starring: Lew Cody; Marion Shilling; Gilbert Roland
- Cinematography: Tom Galligan; Harry Neumann
- Edited by: Mildred Johnston
- Production company: Allied Pictures
- Distributed by: Allied Pictures
- Release date: October 1, 1932
- Running time: 77 minutes
- Country: United States
- Language: English

A Parisian Romance is a 1932 American drama film directed by Chester M. Franklin and starring Lew Cody, Marion Shilling and Gilbert Roland. It is based on the play of the same title by Octave Feuillet, which had previously been made into a 1916 silent film.

== Plot ==
In Paris, a notorious womanizer falls in love with a young woman who at last makes him mend his ways.

== Cast ==
- Lew Cody as Baron
- Marion Shilling as Claudette
- Gilbert Roland as Victor
- Joyce Compton as Marcelle
- Yola d'Avril as Pauline
- Nicholas Soussanin as Emil
- George J. Lewis as Pierre
- Bryant Washburn as Briac
- Helen Jerome Eddy as Yvonne
- Paul Porcasi as Deville
- James Eagles as Paul
- Luis Alberni as Pascal
- Nadine Dore as Marie

== Bibliography ==
- Pitts, Michael R. Poverty Row Studios, 1929–1940: An Illustrated History of 55 Independent Film Companies, with a Filmography for Each. McFarland & Company, 2005.
