= The Fighting Parson (1933 film) =

1933 film

- Film poster
- Directed by: Harry Fraser
- Written by: Harry Fraser
- Story by: Edward Weston
- Produced by: M. H. Hoffman Jr.
- Starring: Hoot Gibson; Marceline Day; Ethel Wales
- Cinematography: Henry N. Kohler; Harry Neumann
- Edited by: Mildred Johnston
- Production company: M. H. Hoffman Productions
- Distributed by: Allied Pictures Corp.
- Release date: August 2, 1933
- Running time: 66-70 minutes (six reels)
- Country: United States
- Language: English

The Fighting Parson is a 1933 American Western film directed by Harry L. Fraser and starring Hoot Gibson, Marceline Day, and Ethel Wales.

== Plot ==
Steve Hartley's friend, Arizona Joe loses Steve's expensive cowboy hat in a dice game. Riding through the countryside, the pair come upon a set of ministerial clothes and a letter from Mrs. Larkin, the patron of one Reverend Joseph Doolittle. Steve decides to impersonate the itinerant preacher. Steve and Arizona Joe ride into the town of Red Dog, where Steve is welcomed as Doolittle, who is scheduled to conduct a series of revival meetings in town.

Steve attempts to extricate himself from his predicament, but must fulfill such requests as baptizing several babies and officiating a marriage. He also falls in love with Mrs. Larkin's niece, Susan. However, things go awry when Steve is suspected of being a friend of Bart, the head of a local outlaw gang. To clear up the mess, Steve runs down the desperados. His efforts lead him into danger, including dynamiting of the side of a mountain.

Steve eventually catches Bart, recovers the stolen money, wins Susan's love, and steps aside to let the real Mr. Doolittle start his revivals. Bart is sentenced to hang the next day and is forced to sit through the revival meeting. As Steve and Susan rise to join the singing, they are holding hands.

== Cast ==
- Hoot Gibson as Steve Hartley
- Marceline Day as Susan Larkin
- Skeeter Bill Robbins as Arizona Joe
- Ethel Wales as Mrs. Larkin
- Stanley Blystone as Bart
- Robert Frazer as Rev. Joseph Doolittle
- Charles King as Mike the henchman
- Phil Dunham as George Larkin
- Jules Cowles as Marshal J. A. Darby
- Fred Gilman as Express Agent

Additional cast members not listed on the film credits included Horace B. Carpenter, Frank Ellis (actor), Merrill McCormick, J. Farrell MacDonald, Frank Nelson (actor), Blackie Whiteford, and Tex Palmer.

== Production ==
In April 1933, The Hollywood Reporter announced that, after a production delay of four weeks, Allied Pictures was planning to begin filming The Fighting Parson. This resulted in the next Hoot Gibson film, Boots of Destiny, being pushed to a later filming date.

== Release and reception ==
The film was passed by the National Board of Review. Copyright L3921 (1933).

The review in Photoplay commended Gibson for "[injecting] comedy into the Western," but complained that there was "Not enough riding, and there's no shooting," causing the film to "run thin."

The Film Daily noted The Fighting Parson was one of several films released close together that included the phrase "The Fighting..." in the title. Others included The Fighting Champ (1932), The Fighting President (1933), and The Fighting Cowboy (1933).

== Bibliography ==
- Pitts, Michael R. Western Movies: A Guide to 5,105 Feature Films. McFarland, 2012.
