= Spirit of the West (film) =

1932 film

- Directed by: Otto Brower
- Starring: Hoot Gibson, Doris Hill, and Hooper Atchley
- Edited by: Mildred Johnston
- Production company: Allied Pictures
- Release date: March 1, 1932
- Running time: 62 minutes
- Country: United States
- Language: English

Spirit of the West is a 1932 American Pre-Code Western film, directed by Otto Brower and starring Hoot Gibson, Doris Hill, and Hooper Atchley.
