= A Man's Land =

1932 film directed by Phil Rosen

- Original film poster
- Directed by: Phil Rosen
- Written by: Adele Buffington
- Produced by: M.H. Hoffman Jr.
- Starring: Hoot Gibson; Marion Shilling; Robert Ellis
- Cinematography: Tom Galligan; Harry Neumann
- Edited by: Mildred Johnston
- Production company: Allied Pictures
- Release date: June 11, 1932 (US)
- Running time: 68 minutes
- Country: United States
- Language: English

A Man's Land is a 1932 American pre-Code Western film, written by Adele Buffington and directed by Phil Rosen. It stars Hoot Gibson, Marion Shilling, and Robert Ellis, and was released on June 11, 1932.

== Plot ==
Tex Mason's ranch is facing a lot of cattle rustling that will put them out of business. Unknown to Tex is that Joe, one of his ranch hands, is in cahoots with John Thomas who desires to take over the ranch for himself when it fails. When the actual owner of the ranch, who lives in Chicago dies, he leaves half the ranch to Tex and half to his daughter, Peggy Turner. Peggy desires to turn the cattle ranch into a dude ranch.

Accompanied by her maiden Aunt Flossie, Peggy travels West and immediately butts horns with Tex. Peggy feels that cattle branding is cruelty to dumb animals, and turns against Tex when he dresses the cattle up in pink and blue ribbons. John Thomas befriends Peggy and sees the chance to set Tex up with the blame for the rustling.

== Cast ==
- Hoot Gibson as Tex Mason
- Marion Shilling as Peggy Turner
- Robert Ellis as John Thomas
- Ethel Wales as Flossie Doolittle
- Skeeter Bill Robbins as Skeeter
- Alan Bridge as Steve
- Charles King as Joe
- Hal Burney as Jake
- Fred Gilman as Deputy Fred
- G. Raymond Nye as Pudge
