= A Shriek in the Night =

1933 film by Albert Ray

- Theatrical Poster
- Directed by: Albert Ray
- Written by: Frances Hyland; Kurt Kempler
- Produced by: M.H. Hoffman; M.H. Hoffman, Jr.
- Starring: Ginger Rogers; Lyle Talbot; Harvey Clark
- Cinematography: Tom Galligan; Harry Neumann
- Edited by: Leete Renick Brown
- Music by: Abe Meyer
- Production company: Allied Pictures
- Distributed by: Allied Pictures
- Release date: July 22, 1933
- Running time: 66 minutes
- Country: United States
- Language: English

A Shriek in the Night is a 1933 American pre-Code mystery crime film with elements of romance directed by Albert Ray and starring Ginger Rogers, Lyle Talbot, and Harvey Clark. It was produced by the independent studio Allied Pictures, and remains the company's best-known release.

In the film, two rival journalists investigate the murder of a wealthy philanthropist, who fell from the balcony of his penthouse apartment. The initial murder is followed by an entire series of murders. Each victim was killed by strangulation.

== Plot ==
Rival newspaper reporters Pat Morgan and Ted Rand find themselves unravelling the mystery behind the death of a millionaire philanthropist who fell from his penthouse balcony. When it is discovered that the plunge was not an accident, the building's residents come under suspicion. Soon, the body count begins to mount as three more murders occur by strangulation.

== Cast ==
- Ginger Rogers as Pat Morgan
- Lyle Talbot as Ted Rand
- Harvey Clark as Peterson, the Janitor
- Purnell Pratt as Police Insp. Russell
- Lillian Harmer as Augusta, the Housekeeper
- Arthur Hoyt as Wilfred
- Louise Beavers as Maid
- Clarence Wilson as Editor Perkins
- Maurice Black as Josephus Martini
- Jim Farley as Jim Brown, Detective
- Tiny Sandford as Eddie, Detective
- Philip Sleeman as Detective

== See also ==
- List of films in the public domain in the United States

== Bibliography ==
- Pitts, Michael R. Poverty Row Studios, 1929–1940. McFarland & Company, 2005.
