= The Dude Bandit =

1933 film

- Directed by: George Melford
- Written by: Jack Natteford (story & adaptation)
- Produced by: M.H. Hoffman
- Starring: Hoot Gibson
- Cinematography: Tom Galligan; Harry Neumann
- Edited by: Mildred Johnston
- Production company: Allied Pictures
- Release date: April 6, 1933
- Running time: 62 minutes
- Country: United States
- Language: English

The Dude Bandit is a 1933 American Pre-Code Western film directed by George Melford. Starring Hoot Gibson, the film is a remake of Gibson's Clearing the Range (1931).

== Cast ==
- Hoot Gibson as "Ace" Cooper posing as Tex
- Gloria Shea as Betty Mason
- Hooper Atchley as Al Burton
- Skeeter Bill Robbins as "Skeeter"
- Horace B. Carpenter as "Doc" Pettit
- Neal Hart as Henchman Jack Hargan
- Lafe McKee as Rancher Brown
- Gordon De Main as Dan "Dad" Mason
- Fred Burns as Sheriff Jim

== Censorship ==
Before The Dude Bandit could be exhibited in Kansas, the Kansas Board of Review required the removal of all scenes where the doctor is drinking.
