= The Hard Hombre =

1931 film

- Film poster
- Directed by: Otto Brower
- Written by: Jack Natteford
- Story by: Jack Natteford
- Produced by: M. H. Hoffman Jr.
- Starring: Hoot Gibson
- Cinematography: Harry Neumann
- Edited by: Mildred Johnston
- Production company: Allied Pictures
- Release date: September 20, 1931
- Running time: 65 minutes
- Country: United States
- Language: English

The Hard Hombre is a 1931 American pre-Code Western film directed by Otto Brower and starring rodeo champion Hoot Gibson.

== Plot ==
A simpleton rancher is mistaken for a notorious outlaw known as The Hard Hombre.

Remade as the 1937 Grand National Films Trailin' Trouble.

== Cast ==
- Hoot Gibson as William Penn "Peaceful" Patton
- Lina Basquette as Senora Martini
- Mathilde Comont as Maria Romero
- G. Raymond Nye as Joe Barlow
- Jessie Arnold as Mrs. Patton
- Christian J. Frank as Sheriff
- Skeeter Bill Robbins as Slim
- Frank Winkleman as The Hard Hombre

== Production ==
Principal photography for The Hard Hombre began on July 14, 1931, where the opening scenes were filmed at Vasquez Rocks in Angeles National Forest. It is one of the first films to be filmed in part at the popular rock formation.
