= Allied Pictures =

American film production company

- Type: Independent
- Industry: Entertainment
- Founded: 1931
- Founder: M.H. Hoffman
- Defunct: 1934
- Fate: Defunct
- Products: Film

Allied Pictures was an American film production company that operated between 1931 and 1934. Controlled by the producer M.H. Hoffman, it was one of the Poverty Row companies of the era turning out low-budget B pictures. The company's best known film is A Shriek in the Night, a thriller from 1933 starring Ginger Rogers.

== History ==
Hoffman established the company in 1931, a year after he had set up another outfit Liberty Pictures. For Allied, Hoffmann signed up Hoot Gibson, a Western star who had recently been released from his contract at Universal Pictures. Gibson still had a popular following, and the company used the profits from his films to back more ambitious literary adaptations that Hoffmann wanted to make such as Vanity Fair and Unholy Love. Monte Blue appeared in three films for Allied, but several other announced films starring him were never made. Another prominent star was Lila Lee.

In 1934, Allied folded, and Hoffman concentrated on running Liberty Pictures until that was merged into the new Republic Pictures.

The company should not be confused with Allied Artists International, an offshoot of another Poverty Row studio Monogram.

== Filmography ==
- Clearing the Range (1931)
- Wild Horse (1931)
- The Hard Hombre (1931)
- Vanity Fair (1932)
- Unholy Love (1932)
- The Local Bad Man (1932)
- Cowboy Counsellor (1932)
- The Gay Buckaroo (1932)
- A Man's Land (1932)
- The Boiling Point (1932)
- Spirit of the West (1932)
- The Stoker (1932)
- A Parisian Romance (1932)
- The Dude Bandit (1933)
- The Fighting Parson (1933)
- The Iron Master (1933)
- Officer Thirteen (1933)
- A Shriek in the Night (1933)
- File 113 (1933)
- The Intruder (1933)
- One Year Later (1933)
- The Eleventh Commandment (1933)
- Picture Brides (1933)

== Bibliography ==
- Pitts, Michael R. Poverty Row Studios, 1929–1940: An Illustrated History of 55 Independent Film Companies, with a Filmography for Each. McFarland & Company, 2005.
