= No Ransom =

1934 film directed by Fred C. Newmeyer

- Directed by: Fred C. Newmeyer
- Written by: Albert DeMond
- Starring: Leila Hyams; Phillips Holmes; Jack La Rue
- Edited by: Mildred Johnston
- Release date: October 8, 1934
- Country: United States
- Language: English

No Ransom is a 1934 American film directed by Fred C. Newmeyer.

== Plot ==
No Ransom film directed by Fred C. Newmeyer in 1934. This comedy-drama is about a husband and a father to two kids. His son is described as a deadbeat, his wild daughter, and his controlling, strict wife are all very unappreciative of what he does for the family. John Winfeild (The main protagaoist) is a wealthy executive for a steel company. He hires a hitman to kill him. Instead of killing him the gunman kidnaps him and then forces his family to be appreciative.

== Cast ==
- Leila Hyams as Barbra Winfield
- Phillips Holmes as Tom Wilson
- Jack La Rue as Larry Romero
- Robert McWade as John Winfield
- Hedda Hopper as Mrs. Winfield
- Vince Barnett as Bullet
- Edward Nugent as Eddie Winfield
- Carl Miller as Ashton Woolcott
- Garry Owen as Archie DeWitt
- Irving Bacon as Heinie
- Arthur Hoyt as Grant
