= Mildred Johnston =

American film editor

- Born: Mildred Maxwell Bell; June 11, 1890; Missouri, USA
- Died: March 20, 1974 (aged 83); Los Angeles, California, USA
- Education: University of Missouri
- Occupation: Film editor
- Spouse: Richard Johnston

Mildred Johnston (born Mildred Bell; June 11, 1890 – March 20, 1974) was an American film editor active in the 1920s and 1930s.

== Biography ==
Mildred was born in Kansas City, Missouri, in 1890, the daughter of Thomas Bell and May Greene. Her father, the city auditor (and a respected journalist), died of typhoid fever when she was 8. She later attended college at the University of Missouri.

By the early 1920s, she was living in Los Angeles with her mother, where she was working as an assistant film editor and script girl. In 1921, she married Richard Johnston, an assistant director and production manager at Paramount. The pair had two daughters.

Between 1928 and 1935, she edited almost three dozen films, most of which were produced by Liberty Pictures. Much of her earlier work during that time range was on B-Westerns. She was also a founding member of the Blind Children's Center of Los Angeles.

By the late 1940s, she seems to have retired from the film industry; her last known credit was on 1935's The Old Homestead. She died on March 20, 1974, in Valley Village, California.

== Selected filmography ==
- The Boiling Point (1932)
- The Iron Master (1933)
- The Fighting Parson (1933)
- Once to Every Bachelor (1934)
- The Old Homestead (1935)
- Born to Gamble (1935)
- Dizzy Dames (1935)
- Without Children (1935)
- Annie Doesn't Live Here Anymore (1935)
- When Strangers Meet (1934)
- Bonds of Honour (1934)
- Two Heads on a Pillow (1934)
- The Great Radio Mystery (1934)
- Once to Every Man (1934)
- Cheaters (1934)
- Picture Brides (1934)
- School for Girls (1934)
- No Ransom (1934)
- One Year Later (1933)
- The Fighting Parson (1933)
- The Dude Bandit (1933)
- The Eleventh Commandment (1933)
- The Intruder (1933)
- The Iron Master (1933)
- The Golden West (1932)
- The Cowboy Counsellor (1932)
- A Parisian Romance (1932)
- The Boiling Point (1932)
- The Stoker (1932)
- A Man's Land (1932)
- Vanity Fair (1932)
- Spirit of the West (1932)
- The Gay Buckaroo (1932)
- The Local Bad Man (1932)
- The Hard Hombre (1931)
- Wild Horse (1931)
- Clearing the Range (1931)
- The Red Mark (1928)
- The Night Flyer (1928)
- On to Reno (1928)
