= Albert Ray =

American film director

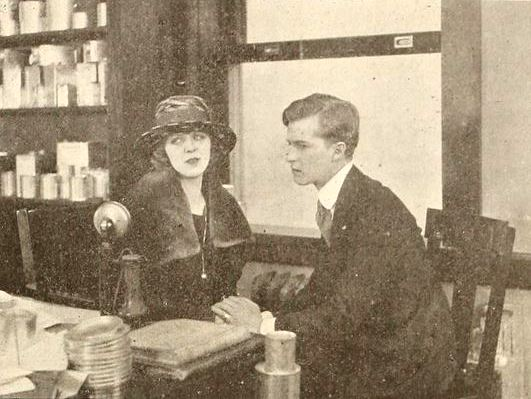
- Elinor Fair and Ray in Be a Little Sport (1919)
- Born: August 28, 1897; New Rochelle, New York
- Died: February 5, 1944 (aged 46); Los Angeles, California
- Occupations: Film director Actor; Screenwriter
- Years active: 1915-1939

Albert Ray (August 28, 1897 – February 5, 1944) was an American film director, actor, and screenwriter. He directed more than 70 films between 1920 and 1939. He also appeared in 18 films between 1915 and 1922. He was born in New Rochelle, New York and died in Los Angeles, California.

== Selected filmography ==
- When Do We Eat? (1918)
- More Trouble (1918)
- Married in Haste (1919)
- Vagabond Luck (1919)
- The Night Riders (1920)
- The Honey Bee (1920)
- The Ugly Duckling (1920)
- More Pay, Less Work (1926)
- Honesty – The Best Policy (1926)
- Love Makes 'Em Wild (1927)
- Rich But Honest (1927)
- Woman Wise (1928)
- A Thief in the Dark (1928) director
- None but the Brave (1928) director
- Molly and Me (1929)
- My Lady's Past (1929)
- Call of the West (1930)
- Her unborn child (1930) director
- Kathleen Mavourneen (1930)
- Unholy Love (1932) director
- Guilty or Not Guilty (1932) director
- The Thirteenth Guest (1932) director
- A Shriek in the Night (1933) director
- West of Singapore (1933)
- Dancing Man (1934)
- St. Louis Woman (1934)
- Everyman's Law (1936)
- Dizzy Doctors (1937)
- Charlie Chan in Reno (1939) screenplay
- Chip of the Flying U (1940)
- The Cheaters (1945) original story
