= 1886 in literature =

This article contains information about the literary events and publications of 1886.

== Events ==
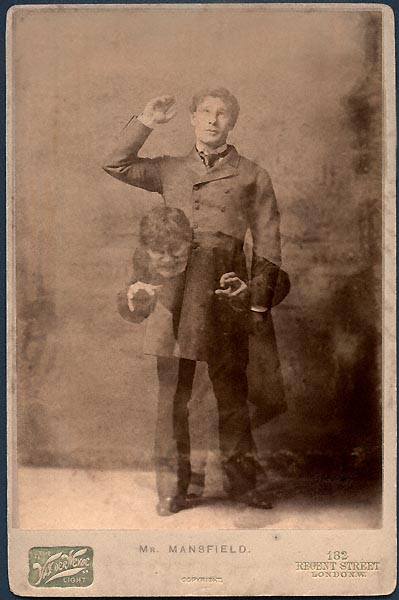
Richard Mansfield in the dual roles of Dr. Jekyll and Mr. Hyde

- January – MLN: Modern Language Notes, an academic journal, introduces European literary criticism into American scholarship. It is founded at Johns Hopkins University.
- January 5 and January 9 – Robert Louis Stevenson's horror novella Strange Case of Dr Jekyll and Mr Hyde appears in New York and London. Almost 40,000 copies are sold in the first six months.
- January 17 – The Anglo-Irish writers and cousins Somerville and Ross first meet, at Castletownshend, County Cork, Ireland.
- February – A list of 100 books considered "necessary for a liberal education", compiled by John Lubbock, is published.
- February 22 – The first performance of William Gillette's American Civil War drama Held by the Enemy is held at the Criterion Theater, Brooklyn, New York.
- April 10 – Anatole Baju begins publication of the magazine Le Décadent in Paris, in an effort to define and organize the Decadent movement.
- May–July – Robert Louis Stevenson's Scottish historical novel Kidnapped is serialized in the London magazine Young Folks.
- May 7 – Percy Bysshe Shelley's verse drama The Cenci, A Tragedy, in Five Acts, written and printed in Italy in 1819, is first played privately in England, sponsored by the Shelley Society, at the Grand Theatre, Islington, London, before an audience that includes Robert Browning (for whose birthday it is held), George Bernard Shaw and Oscar Wilde. Oscar Wilde's review of it in Dramatic Review appears on May 15.
- September 9 – The Berne Convention for the Protection of Literary and Artistic Works is signed.
- September 18 – The "Symbolist Manifesto" (Le Symbolisme) is placed in the French newspaper Le Figaro by a Greek-born poet Jean Moréas, who calls Symbolism hostile to "plain meanings, declamations, false sentimentality and matter-of-fact description," and intended to "clothe the Ideal in a perceptible form" whose "goal was not in itself, but whose sole purpose was to express the Ideal."
- Fall – Clifford Barnes is taken on as a clerk at the Manhattan book store Arthur Hinds & Co., which will become Barnes & Noble.
- November – Rudyard Kipling's Plain Tales from the Hills begin to appear in the Lahore Civil and Military Gazette under the British Raj.
- May 15 – Emily Dickinson dies aged 55 of Bright's disease at the family home in Amherst, Massachusetts, with fewer than a dozen of her 1,800 poems published. She is buried under the self-penned epitaph "Called Back". After publication of a first collection of her verse in 1890, she will be seen with Walt Whitman as one of the two quintessential nineteenth-century American poets.
- unknown dates
  - A Japanese adaptation of Shakespeare's play Hamlet as Hamuretto Yamato Nishiki-e is serialized in the newspaper Tokyo Eiri Shimbun.
  - The first English language translation of Flaubert's novel Madame Bovary (1856), made by Eleanor Marx, is published by Henry Vizetelly in London.

== New books ==
=== Fiction ===
- Edmondo De Amicis – Heart (Cuore)
- Herman Bang – Ved Vejen (published in the collection Stille Eksistenser)
- Emilia Pardo Bazán – Los pazos de Ulloa (The House of Ulloa, publication commenced)
- Leon Bloy – Disperato
- Rhoda Broughton – Doctor Cupid
- Hall Caine – A Son of Hagar
- Mary Cholmondeley – The Danvers Jewels
- Wilkie Collins
  - The Evil Genius
  - The Guilty River
- Marie Corelli – A Romance of Two Worlds
- Alice Diehl – Griselda
- George Gissing – Demos; A Story of English Socialism
- Maxwell Gray (Mary Gleed Tuttiett) – The Silence of Dean Maitland
- Thomas Hardy – The Mayor of Casterbridge
- William Dean Howells – Indian Summer
- Fergus Hume – The Mystery of a Hansom Cab
- Henry James
  - The Bostonians
  - The Princess Casamassima
- Jerome K. Jerome – The Idle Thoughts of an Idle Fellow
- Lie Kim Hok – Tjhit Liap Seng
- Vladimir Korolenko – The Blind Musician
- Pierre Loti – Pêcheur d'Islande
- Jules Mary – Roger la Honte
- Octave Mirbeau – Le Calvaire
- George A. Moore
  - A Drama in Muslin
  - Confessions of a Young Man
- Bolesław Prus – The Outpost (Placówka; serialization complete, book publication)
- Britiffe Constable Skittowe – Sudden Death, or, My Lady the Wolf
- Robert Louis Stevenson –Strange Case of Dr Jekyll and Mr Hyde
- August Strindberg – Getting Married (Giftas), vol. II (short stories)
- Leo Tolstoy – The Death of Ivan Ilyich (Смерть Ивана Ильича, Smert' Ivana Ilyicha)
- Jules Verne
  - The Lottery Ticket
  - Robur the Conqueror
- Eduard Vilde – Musta mantliga mees (The Man in the Black Coat)
- Auguste Villiers de l'Isle-Adam – Eva Futura
- Émile Zola – L'Œuvre

=== Children and young people ===
- Louisa May Alcott – Jo's Boys
- Frances Hodgson Burnett – Little Lord Fauntleroy
- L. T. Meade – A World of Girls. The Story of a School
- Robert Louis Stevenson – Kidnapped

=== Drama ===
- Anton Chekhov – On the Harmful Effects of Tobacco (<О вреде табака>, O vredye tabaka)
- Archibald Clavering Gunter – Prince Karl
- Henrik Ibsen – Rosmersholm
- Alexander Kielland – Tre Par
- Denman Thompson and George W. Ryer – The Old Homestead
- Leo Tolstoy – The Power of Darkness (<Власть тьмы>, Vlast′ t′my; not staged until 1902)
- William Butler Yeats – Mosada

=== Non-fiction ===
- Edwin Abbott Abbott – The Kernel and the Husk
- Marian Alford – Needlework as Art
- Edward Wilmot Blyden – Christianity, Islam and the Negro Race
- Edward Dowden – The Life of Percy Bysshe Shelley
- Warren Felt Evans – Esoteric Christianity and Mental Therapeutics
- William Morris – A Dream of John Ball
- Friedrich Nietzsche – Beyond Good and Evil
- Emily Ruete – Memoirs of an Arabian Princess: An Autobiography
- Charles Taze Russell – The Plan of the Ages (later The Divine Plan of the Ages, vol. 1 of Millennial Dawn, later Studies in the Scriptures)
- A. E. Waite – The Mysteries of Magic
- Sir Henry Yule and Arthur Coke Burnell – "Hobson-Jobson"

== Births ==
- January 1 – Ethel Carnie Holdsworth, English working class novelist and campaigner (died 1962)
- January 14 – Hugh Lofting, English children's writer (died 1947)
- February 11 – May Ziadeh, Lebanese-Palestinian poet, essayist and translator (died 1941)
- February 13 – Ricardo Güiraldes, Argentinian novelist and poet (died 1927)
- March 1 – Oskar Kokoschka, Austrian poet and artist (died 1980)
- March 30 – Frances Cornford (née Darwin, FCC), English poet (died 1960)
- April 1 – Brita von Horn, Swedish dramatist, novelist and theatre director (died 1983)
- April 15 – Nikolay Gumilyov, Russian Acmeist poet (executed 1921)
- May 2 – Gottfried Benn, German poet and essayist (died 1956)
- May 16 – Vladislav Khodasevich, Russian poet and critic (died 1939)
- June 11 – Emma L. Brock, American children's author and illustrator (died 1974)
- June 26 – Donar Munteanu, Romanian poet and magistrate (died 1972)
- July 16 – Pierre Benoît, French novelist (died 1962)
- July 22 – Hella Wuolijoki, Estonian-born Finnish writer (died 1954)
- July 24 – Jun'ichirō Tanizaki (谷崎 潤一郎), Japanese novelist (died 1965)
- September 8 – Siegfried Sassoon, English poet and memoirist (died 1967)
- September 10 – H.D. (Hilda Doolittle), poet, novelist and essayist (died 1961)
- September 20 – Charles Williams, English poet, novelist, playwright and theologian (died 1945)
- October 4 – Lennox Robinson, Irish dramatist, poet and theatre producer (died 1958)
- October 25 – Karl Polanyi (Károly Polányi), Austro-Hungarian economic historian and social philosopher (died 1964)
- November 1 – Hermann Broch, Austrian Modernist writer (died 1951)
- November 21 – Harold Nicolson, English author (died 1968)
- November 29 – Thomas Burke, English novelist and story writer (died 1945)
- December 5 – Rose Wilder Lane, American journalist and libertarian (died 1968)
- Victor Llona, Peruvian-born translator (died 1953)

== Deaths ==
- January 25 – Benjamín Vicuña Mackenna, Chilean historian (born 1831)
- March 17 – Pierre-Jules Hetzel, French publisher (born 1814)
- March 27 – Sir Henry Taylor, English dramatist, poet and public official (born 1800)
- April 9 – Joseph Victor von Scheffel, German poet and novelist (born 1826)
- April 13 – Anna Louisa Geertruida Bosboom-Toussaint, Dutch novelist (born 1812)
- May 4 – Eliza Lanesford Cushing, American Canadian dramatist, short story writer, and editor (born 1794)
- May 15 – Emily Dickinson, American poet (born 1830)
- May 17 – Erskine May, English constitutional theorist (born 1815)
- June 14 – Alexander Ostrovsky, Russian dramatist (born 1823)
- July 9 – Roger Edwards, minister and writer (born 1811)
- July 16 – Ned Buntline (Edward Zane Carroll Judson Sr.), American publisher, dime novelist and publicist (born 1821)
- July 21 – Maximilian Wolfgang Duncker, German historian (born 1811)
- August 9 – Samuel Ferguson, Irish poet and antiquary (born 1810)
- September 25 – Hannah T. King, British-born American writer and pioneer (born 1808)
- October 21 – José Hernández, Argentine poet (born 1834)
- October 22 – Matilda Jane Evans, English-born Australian novelist (born 1827)
- November 21 – Johannes Scherr, German novelist and critic (born 1817)
- November 22 – Mary Boykin Chesnut, American diarist (born 1823)
- December 12 – Johan Nicolai Madvig, Danish philologist (born 1804)

== Awards ==
- Newdigate Prize – R. L. Gales
