= Central Theatre (San Francisco) =

Coordinates: 37.7788°N 122.4133°W

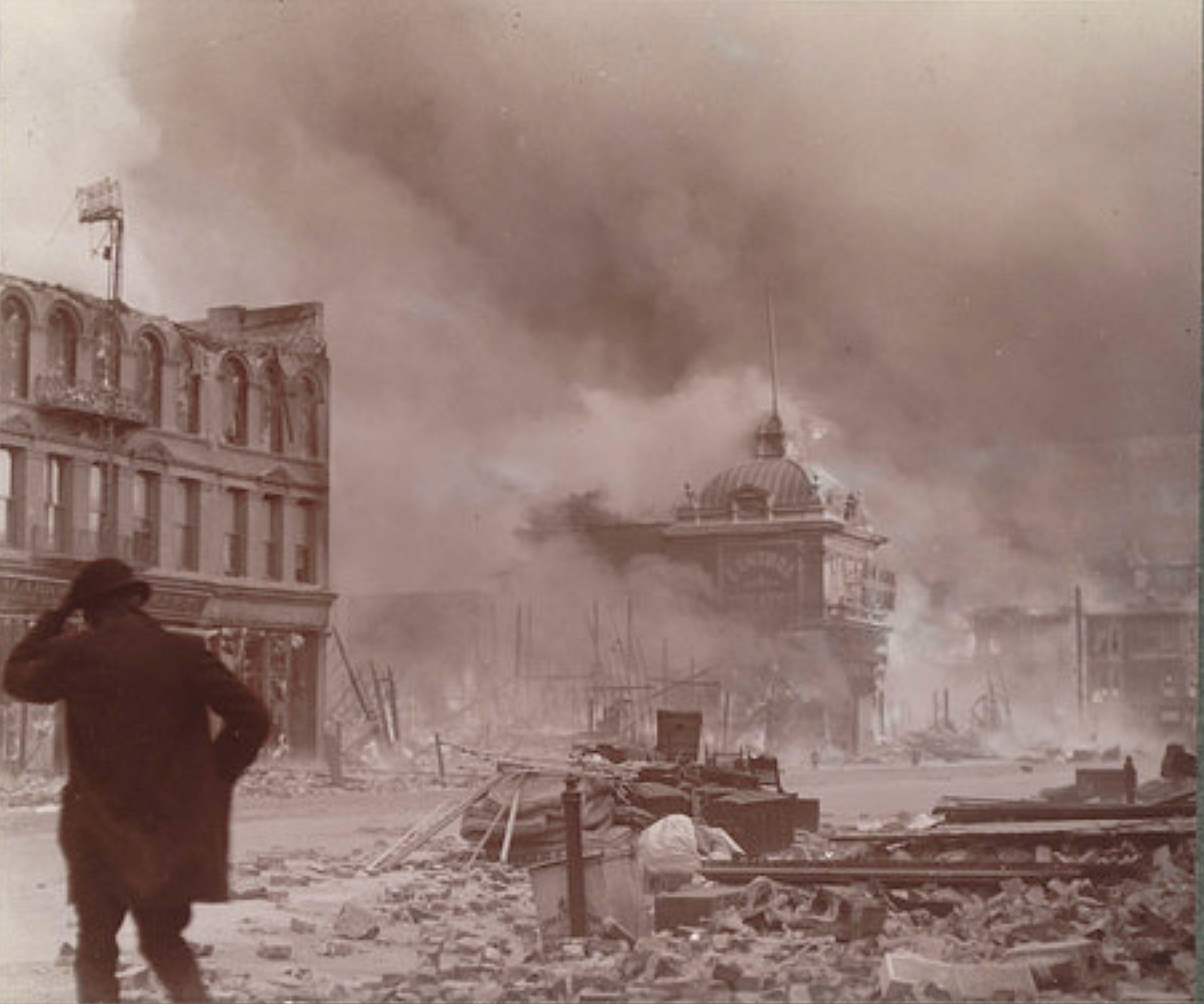
Central Theatre (center) on fire in the aftermath of the 1906 San Francisco earthquake.

The Central Theatre was the name of two theaters in San Francisco, California located at 1177 Market Street between 8th St and 9th St. The first theatre was built in 1900 and lasted until it was destroyed by fire in the 1906 San Francisco earthquake. The second theatre was rapidly built on the same property in 1906, and lasted until 1913 when it was destroyed in a second fire.

== History ==
The Central Theatre (CT) was a theatre in San Francisco, California located on Market Street between 8th St and 9th St across from San Francisco City Hall. It was situated on the Central Park property (San Francisco's baseball park) and was built in 1900 by the Central Park Amusement Company. The owner of the property on which it was built was real estate tycoon Andrew Buchanan McCreery. The theatre opened on December 22, 1900 as Belasco and Thall's Central Theatre with a production of David Belasco's The Heart of Maryland. This was followed by a production of Arthur Shirley and Ben Landeck's Women and Wine in January 1901.

The CT operated as repertory theatre with a resident stock company. Other plays performed at the CT included Sidney R. Ellis's Darkest Russia (1901), Dion Boucicault's After Dark (1901) Edward W. Townsend's Chimmie Fadden (1901), George W. Ryer and Denman Thompson's The Two Sisters (1901), Howard P. Taylor's The Pulse of New York (1902), Theodore Kremer's The Bowery After Dark (1902), Uncle Tom's Cabin (1903), Joseph Le Brandt's Caught in the Web (1903), Mrs. Archie Cowper's The Dairy Farm (1903), Lincoln J. Carter's Two Little Waifs (1904), Rip Van Winkle (1904), J. W. Harkins's The White Squadron (1904), Will C. Murphy's Why Women Sin (1905), Owen Davis's The Confessions of a Wife (1905), and Kremer's Queen of the Convicts (1906) among many others.

The CT was destroyed by fire in the 1906 San Francisco earthquake on April 18, 1906. McCreery announced intentions to build a new theatre on the site in June 1906, and plans to use a tent as a temporary venue once the debris was cleared were also made. The theatre was rapidly rebuilt, and was the first downtown theatre constructed after the 1906 disaster. J. A. Raynes's musical Lonesome Town starring comedy duo Kolb and Dill was given its premiere at the theatre in September 1906. The second CT lasted until April 1913 when another fire destroyed the second fire.
