= Theatre Francais =

Theatre Francais or Théâtre-Français may refer to several theaters:

- Comédie-Française
- Théâtre-Français, a 1792 theatre in Rouen (demolished 1944)
- Theatre Francais (New York), an 1866 theatre designed by Alexander Saeltzer on 107 West 14th Street (demolished 1939)
