= The Adventurer (1917 film) =

1917 film by Charlie Chaplin

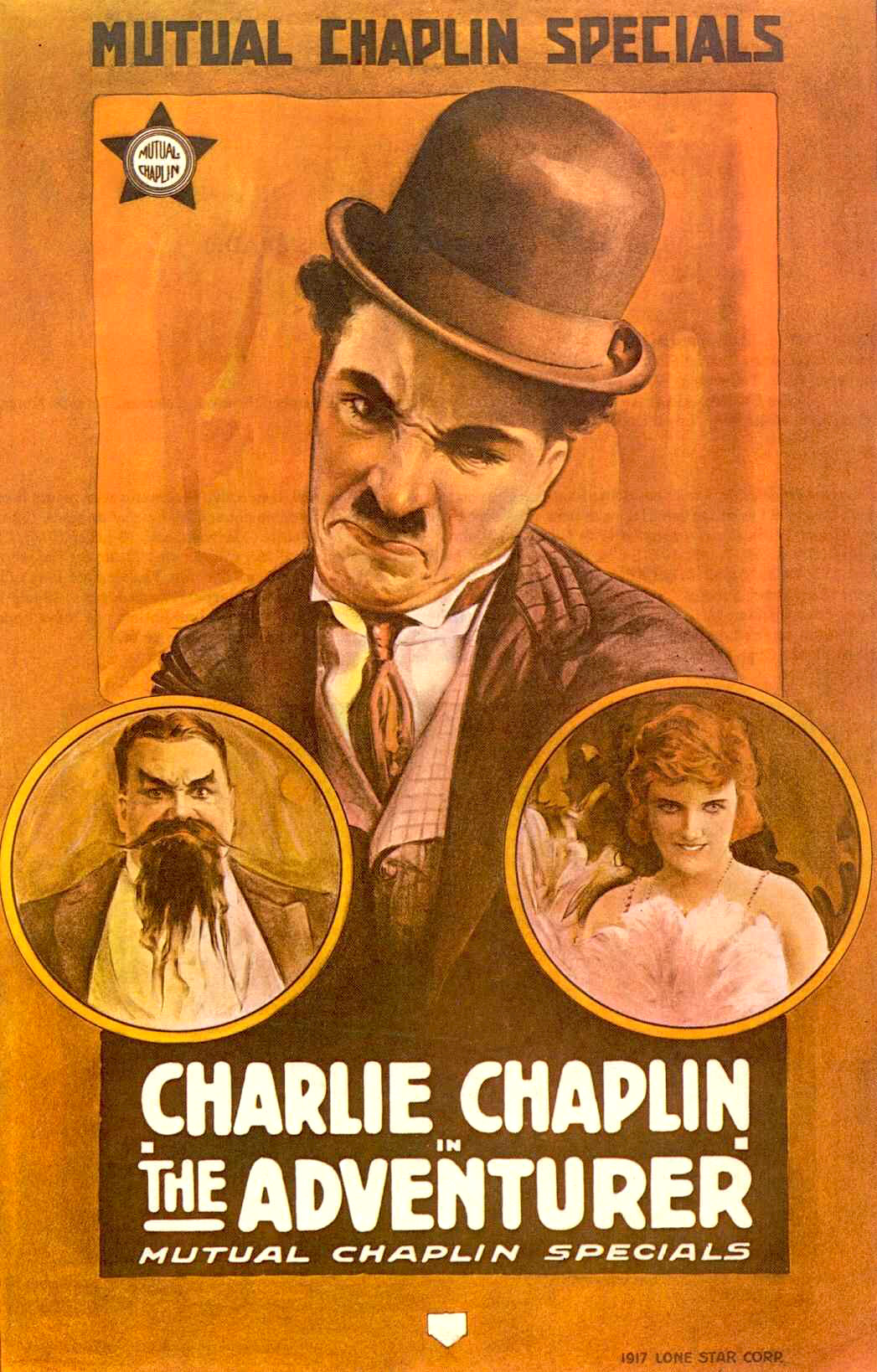
- Theatrical release poster
- Directed by: Charlie Chaplin; Edward Brewer (technical director)
- Written by: Charlie Chaplin (scenario); Vincent Bryan (scenario); Maverick Terrell (scenario)
- Produced by: John Jasper
- Starring: Charlie Chaplin; Edna Purviance; Eric Campbell
- Cinematography: Roland Totheroh; George C. Zalibra
- Edited by: Charlie Chaplin
- Distributed by: Mutual Film Corporation
- Release date: October 22, 1917
- Running time: 25 minutes (2-reels)
- Country: United States
- Language: Silent (English intertitles)

The film

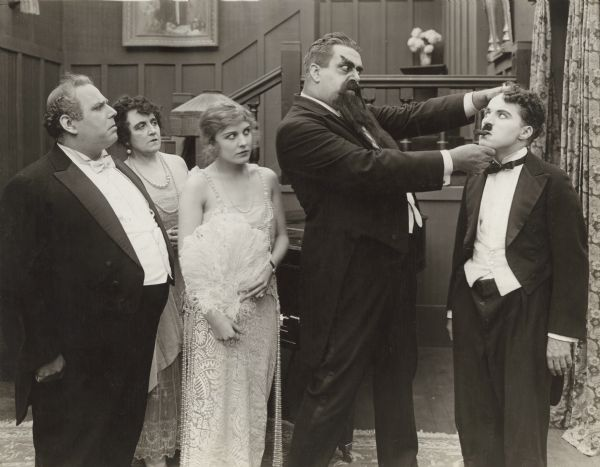
From left to right are Henry Bergman, Marta Golden, Edna Purviance, Eric Campbell and Charlie Chaplin in a scene still from the film

The Adventurer is an American silent short comedy film made in 1917 written and directed by Charlie Chaplin, and is the last of the twelve films made under contract for the Mutual Film Corporation. It is in the public domain.

== Plot ==
The police are hunting for an escaped convict who has cleverly eluded the guards so far. One officer is told to guard the beach in case he comes within sight again. However, unbeknownst to the officer, the convict is actually buried under sand next to him.

Fully aware of the danger, he is very cautious regarding his escape. He unburies himself very cautiously, however, the officer is asleep and falls back on the hole which the convict created while un-burying himself. The convict makes a run for it as the officer fires, missing the convict by an inch. The convict hurriedly climbs up a vertical wall of mud and stone, and the officer chases after him.

A few seconds later, however, it seems the convict is finished when a policeman stealthily creeps up to him. He steps on his hand, however the convict thinks it's a stray stone and covers it with mud. When he looks up and sees the officer, the chase resumes, and the convict eludes the officer but runs, into another group of officers.

The convict runs all the way up to the top of the dusty cliff. Just when it seems like the convict is free, another officer leaps in out of nowhere and shoots the convict. However, the shot missed its mark, and the convict, feigning death, fools the officer successfully. In the middle of the check-up to make sure the convict was dead, the convict kicks him down the hill.

He takes the officer's hiding place while the father and his companion come to that same spot looking for the convict. The convict sees them and makes an escape through a hole. He grabs a police officer's gun, and uses this to threaten the police. Meanwhile, he tiptoes backwards, trips against a stray rock, and accidentally fires at the father. The shot was not fatal, but irritates him.

The convict swims towards the deep seas as the policemen chase him in a boat. They are unprepared for the high tide, and a huge wave knocks them over. The convict swims over towards a boat where a man is desperately trying to take off his wet shirt.

A girl is with her lover when they realize the girl's mother is drowning. They go over to help her and beg the suitor to help, but he refuses because of his weight. She jumps in, while the suitor leans against the fence and hawks at her. However, this man's weight causes him to fall in the water.

Hearing the chaos ensuing between the suitor, the girl, and her mother, the convict, who had just found some dry land, decides to investigate. He jumps back into the water and swims over to where he thinks the chaos is taking place. He finds the girl on the shore and she begs him to save her mother. The convict saves the girl first, then her mother, then swims towards the suitor and swims circles around him. Finally, he uses his beard to pull himself back to shore.

He then rescues everybody else. The authorities arrive, and the girl's unconscious mother is the first to go into the ambulance. However, she soon gains her consciousness, and the convict lies to her, and before heading back to rescue the suitor, in the process unintentionally tossing him back into the water. He goes back and rescues the suitor. However, in the process, the convict hurts himself and lies down on the shore, helpless and unable to walk. However, a policeman saw him, called the girl, and rescues the injured the convict.

The convict now wakes up in the house of the girl, the woman he now loves. However, him wearing his striped pajamas, and lying in a bed with bars at the head, makes him think he is in prison, which is cleared when the butler enters with a towel. The girl and the convict go to the balcony to socialize, where the convict accidentally kicks the suitor who thinks it is intentional and kicks him back. They go on kicking each other for a while, till a lady intervenes between the convict and the suitor. Since the suitor and the convict had their backs to each other, the suitor couldn't see the lady intervening. Therefore, he kicks her buttock, thinking it's the convict's he's kicked. He gets embarrassed by his blunder, and the others are bothered by it.

Inside, while the girl plays the piano, the suitor tries getting revenge but to no avail. The convict sloshes a whole lot of beer on him, and he retreats. However, when he does, he sees the convict's face on the newspaper, under the headline "Criminal Escapes: Convict Still at Large".

He uses it as a way of getting revenge, and when the convict talks with the girl's father, who is the judge who sentenced him to prison, the convict is scared. But he acts calm, going under the alias "Commodore Slick". However, at the worst possible moment, the suitor barges in, shoves the convict out and tells the judge to come look at the newspaper. When the convict comes across the headline, he is scared. As a last resort, he takes out his pen and draws a beard, thinking it will make the judge think that the suitor is the convict.

The judge falls for the trap. When the determined suitor stalks in with the judge, he grabs the paper and shows it to Brown. Of course, the judge thinks that this man has got it wrong, and shows it to the convict who looks at the paper, and looks back at the father.

He talks to everybody inside, trying to blend in after that near brush with the judge. He talks to everybody, including the girl, and then decides to go to the kitchen with her.

But in the kitchen, the cook is giving a meal to her policeman friend, so when the knock sounds, the policeman hurriedly goes towards the closet. The convict and the girl enter just as she is closing the door, so the convict is curious. He opens the closet, sees the policeman and, in an instant, closes the door and darts out of the room.

A chase ensues with the convict coming close to getting caught several times. In the end, one police officer corners him and it looks like the convict will finally be apprehended, however the convict outwits him. He introduces the policeman and the girl, and when the policeman is taking his police hat off, the convict breaks away from his grasp and runs away, the police chasing him.

== Cast ==
- Charlie Chaplin - the convict
- Edna Purviance - the girl
- Eric Campbell - the suitor
- Henry Bergman - the father
- Albert Austin - the butler
- Marta Golden - the girl's mother
- May White - the lady
- Frank J. Coleman - the prison guard (uncredited)

== Critical reception ==
Chaplin broadened the scope of his comedic delivery considerably during his time with Mutual, and this picture is another wherein he made bold choices that departed from the old format of his films. This was acknowledged by a reviewer from The Moving Picture World that began with the byline: "Latest Mutual-Chaplin Comedy Moves Upward in Grade But Loses None of Comedian's Usual Amount of Laughs." He continued: "There is very little of the old slapstick, custard pie type of comedy used in this picture, but the comedian has introduced a generous share of sure-fire comedy business, and he still retains his unmatchable ability to plant a swift kick at any and all times where it will do the most good and the least harm."

A re-release of the film inspired this enthusiastic review in the August 16, 1920 New York Times. This was written during a period in which Chaplin's film output was practically nonexistent.

"On the Rivoli program, and also at the Rialto, is a Chaplin revival. The Adventurer, which makes one wish, between laughs, that the screen's best comedian would get to work and do what everyone knows he is capable of. There is a slap-stick coarse humor in The Adventurer, but also some of Chaplin's most irresistible pantomime."

== Sound version ==
In 1932, Amedee Van Beuren of Van Beuren Studios, purchased Chaplin's Mutual comedies for $10,000 each, added music by Gene Rodemich and Winston Sharples and sound effects, and re-released them through RKO Radio Pictures. Chaplin had no legal recourse to stop the RKO release.

== See also ==
- List of American films of 1917
- Charlie Chaplin filmography
