= Frank J. Coleman =

American actor (1888–1948)

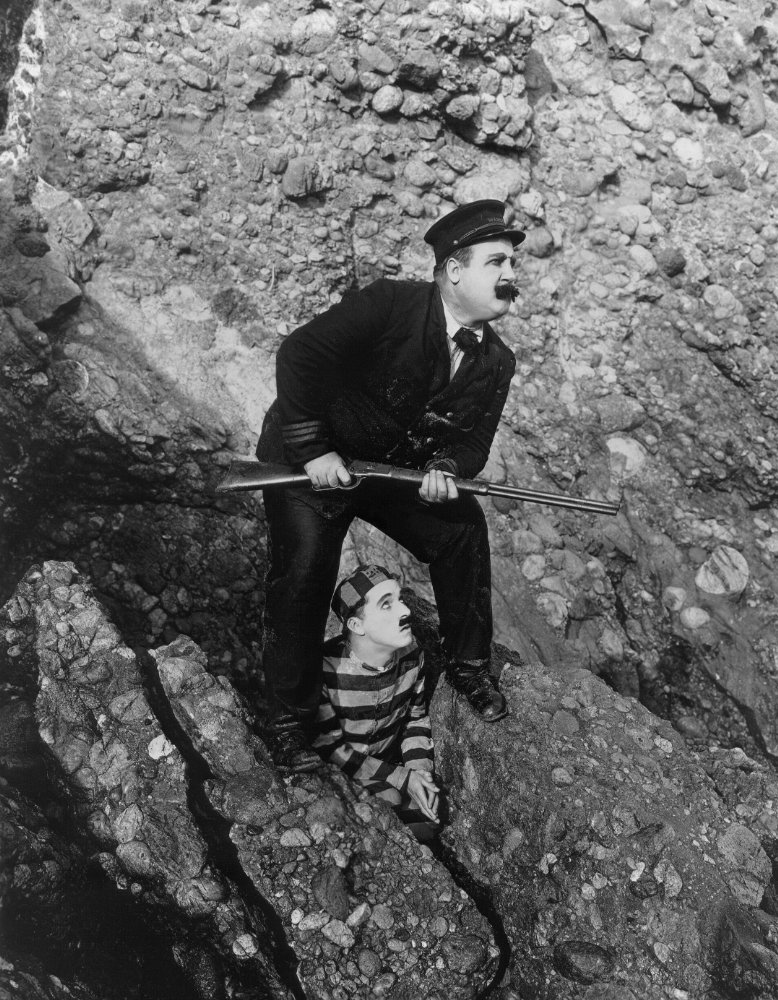
- Coleman in The Adventurer (1917)
- Born: Frank John Coleman; 26 April 1888; Newburgh, New York
- Died: 29 November 1948 (aged 60); Los Angeles, California, United States
- Years active: 1915–1927

Frank John Coleman (26 April 1888 – 29 November 1948) was an American silent film actor.

He was born on 26 April 1888 in Newburgh, New York. He acted with Charlie Chaplin at Essanay Studios in Los Angeles, and continued with him at Mutual in June 1917.

== Partial filmography ==
- The Bank (1915)
- Burlesque on Carmen (1915)
- The Floorwalker (1916)
- The Rink (1916)
- The Vagabond (1916)
- The Fireman (1916)
- The Count (1916)
- The Pawnshop (1916)
- Behind the Screen (1916)
- The Adventurer (1917)
- The Cure (1917)
- Easy Street (1917)
- The Immigrant (1917)
- The Tenderfoot (1917)
- A High Diver’s Last Kiss (1918)
- A Fresh Start (1920)
- The Cave Girl (1921)
- The Show (1922)
