= Cross Currents (1916 film) =

1916 silent film starring Helen Ware

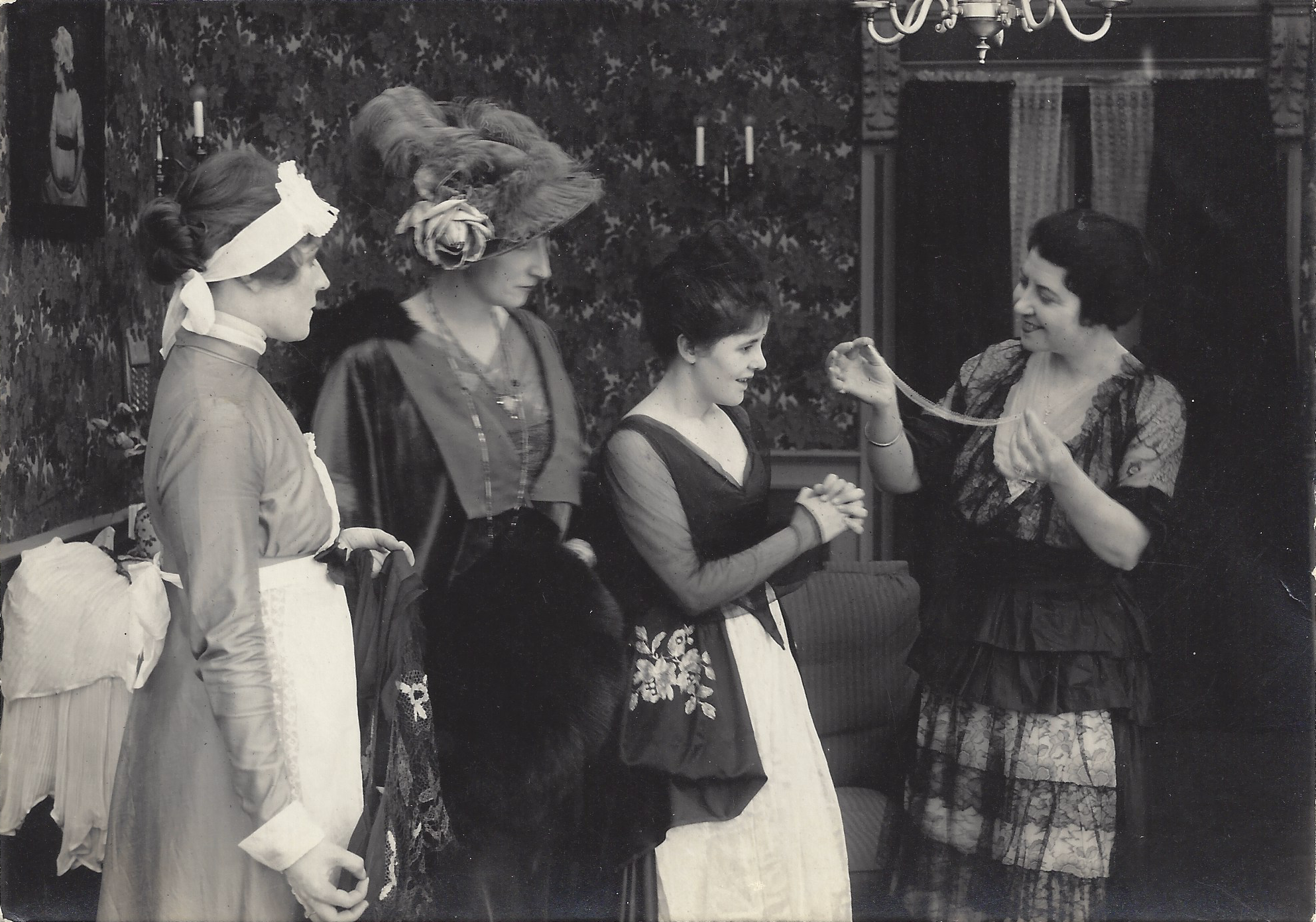
- Still from Cross Currents
- Directed by: Francis J. Grandon
- Written by: Mary H. O'Connor
- Starring: Helen Ware
- Production company: Triangle Film Corporation
- Release date: January 2, 1916 (U.S.)
- Running time: 5 reels, 50 min
- Country: United States
- Language: Silent (English intertitles)

Cross Currents is a 1916 American silent film starring Helen Ware. Composer J. A. Raynes composed theatre organ music to accompany this film.

== Plot ==
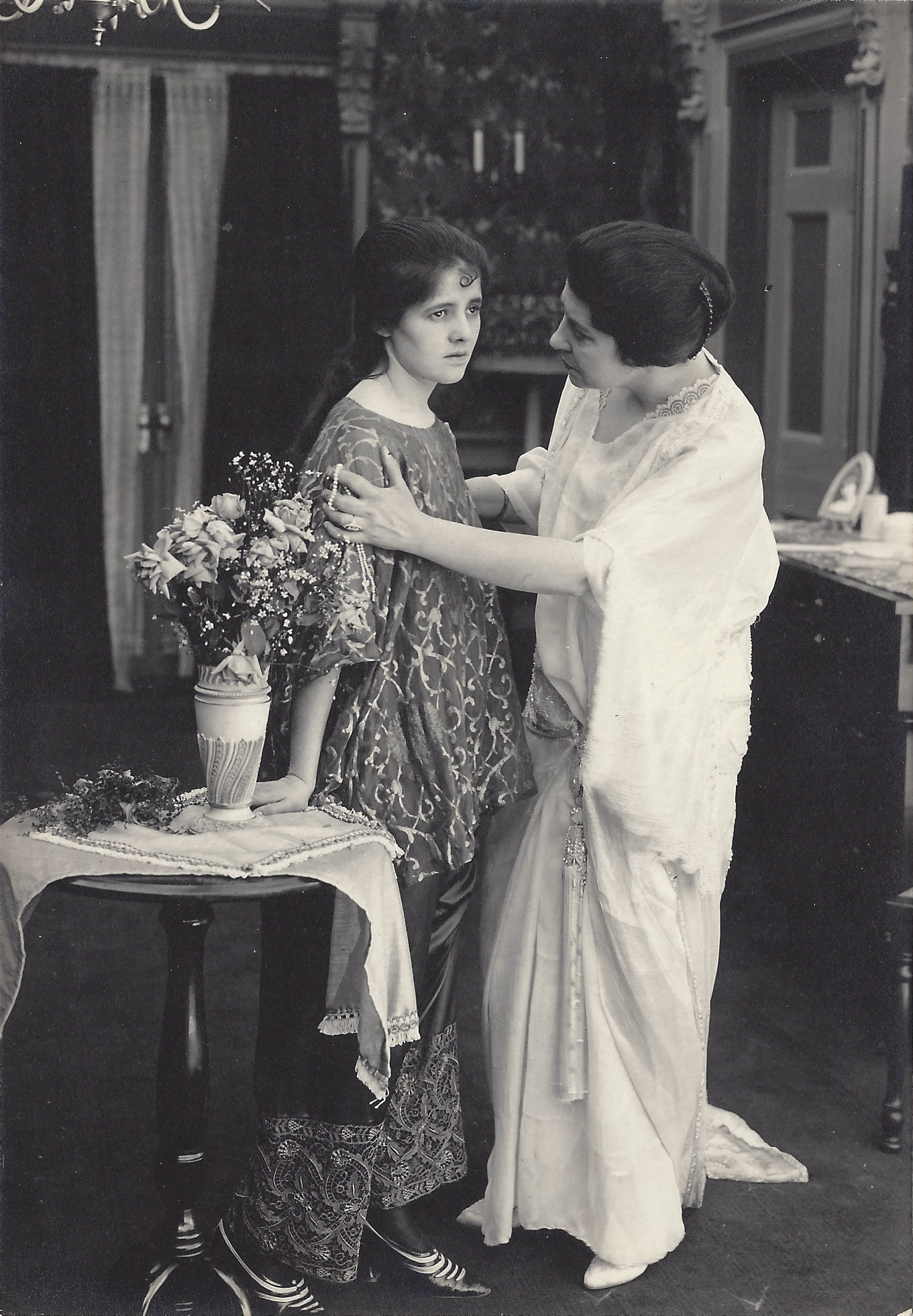
Scene from the film

Ware portrays a young socialite, Elizabeth Crane, who realizes her fiancé, Paul Beale, has a greater love for another woman, Flavia, and steps aside so he may marry. Later they are isolated on a deserted island and rekindle their love.

== Cast ==
- Helen Ware as Elizabeth Crane, a young socialite
- Courtenay Foote as Paul Beale, Elizabeth's fiancé
- Teddy Sampson as Flavia, Elizabeth's foster sister, and Paul's eventual wife
- Sam De Grasse as millionnaire Sila Randolph, who wishes to marry Elizabeth
- Vera Lewis as Mrs. Van de Meer

== Reception ==
Louis Reeves Harrison of The Moving Picture World characterized the film as "admirably typed and handled," and noted Ware's performance, "The story carries her from the stilted posturing of the drawing room to the free expression of her intelligence in an extremely difficult performance."

On the other hand, Hazel Simpson Naylor of Motion Picture Magazine found the film "singularly lacking in feminine beauty."
