= Lonesome Town (musical) =

Musical by J. A. Raynes and Judson D. Brusie

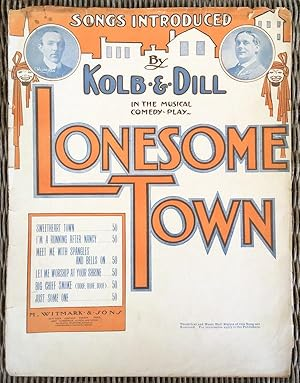
Front cover of the sheet music for Lonesome Town which was published by M. Witmark & Sons in 1907.

Lonesome Town is a musical in two acts with music by J. A. Raynes and both book and lyrics by Judson D. Brusie. Set in the fictional boomtown of Watts, California in 1902, the musical's comedy of errors plot centered around competing claimants to valuable real estate in the city. The musical was created as a starring vehicle for the comedy duo Kolb and Dill. It premiered at the Central Theatre in San Francisco in September 1906. A successful road musical, it toured the United States for several years. This tour included a run at Broadway's Circle Theatre where it played for 88 performances from January 20, 1908, through April 4, 1908.

Lonesome Town was directed by Frank Smithson and was both produced and choreographed by Kolb and Dill. It used sets designed by Homer Emens and costumes by the Eaves Costume Company. C. William Kolb portrayed tramp Chico Charlie with Max M. Dill as his counterpart in crime Bakersfield Bill. Other members of the cast included Maude Lambert as the New York widow Mrs. A. Marvellous Wonder and Georgia O'Ramey as Hazy Fogg among others.
