= Beyond the Rainbow =

1922 film by Christy Cabanne

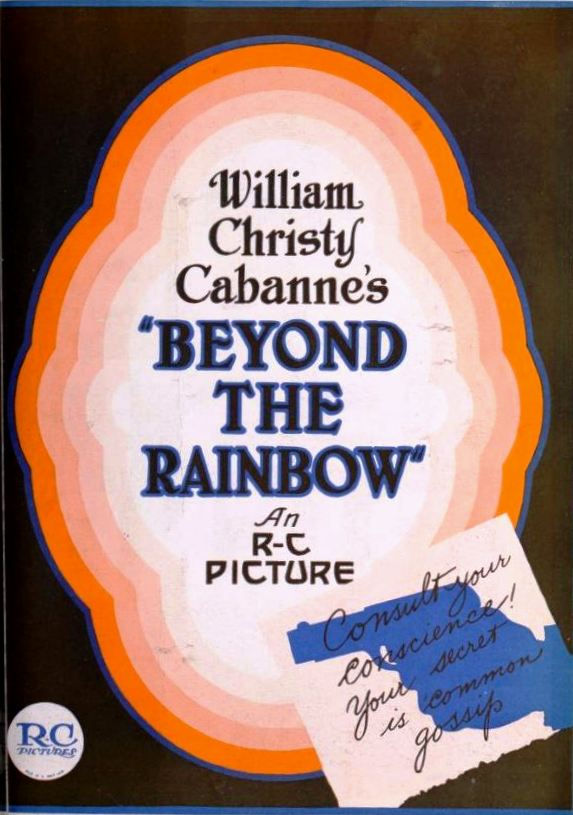
- Advertisement
- Directed by: Christy Cabanne
- Written by: Christy Cabanne; Loila Brooks (adaptation); Eustace Hale Ball (adaptation)
- Based on: "The Price of Feathers" by Solita Solano
- Starring: Harry T. Morey; Billie Dove; Clara Bow
- Cinematography: Philip Armand; William H. Tuers
- Distributed by: Robertson-Cole Pictures
- Release date: February 19, 1922 (United States)
- Running time: 65 minutes
- Country: United States
- Language: Silent (English intertitles)

Beyond the Rainbow is a 1922 American silent drama film starring Billie Dove, Harry T. Morey and Clara Bow in her film debut. A 16mm print of the film is in the collection of the UCLA Film and Television Archive.

== Plot ==
As described in a film magazine, Marion Taylor is a stenographer employed by Wall Street broker Edward Mallory. She is the support of an invalid younger brother, who has been ordered to the Adirondack Mountains by the family physician. To get money for this, she attends a reception as the escort of a young society man, for which she receives $100. Edward is peeved as she has rejected his advances, and threatens to expose her when he sees Marion at the party. Each guest at the function receives a mysterious note saying, "Consult your conscience. Your secret is common gossip." Immediately, the guests are thrown into a panic as each has something to hide. The notes, however, were inspired by flapper Virginia Gardener, who had been left out of the party thrown by her mother, and passed out the notes as a joke to get revenge. A man is shot during the excitement and Major Bruce Forbes, who picked up the gun, is initially accused of murder. However, the real shooter soon confesses. Marion goes to the Adirondacks to see her brother, and finds happiness in the arms of Bruce, who fell in love with her at the ball.

== Cast ==
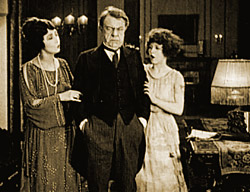
From left, Helen Ware, George Fawcett, and Clara Bow.

- Harry T. Morey as Edward Mallory
- Billie Dove as Marion Taylor
- Virginia Lee as Henrietta Greeley
- Diana Allen as Frances Gardener
- James Harrison as Louis Wade
- Macey Harlam as Count Julien deBrisac
- Rose Coghlan as Mrs. Burns
- William H. Tooker as Dr. Ramsey
- George Fawcett as Nathanial Gardener
- Helen Ware as Mrs. Nathanial Gardener
- Marguerite Courtot as Esther Dowling
- Edmund Breese as Insp. Richardson
- Walter Miller as Robert Judson
- Charles Craig as Col. Henry Gartwright
- Clara Bow as Virginia Gardener
- Huntley Gordon as Major Bruce Forbes
- Helen Ware as Mrs. Nathanial Gardener
- Gardner James as Ted Lansing

== Production notes ==
Clara Bow made her film debut in Beyond the Rainbow after winning a beauty and acting magazine sponsored contest. She filmed five scenes but, after seeing the film in Brooklyn, thought that she was cut from the film. Bow was devastated and put temporarily her acting ambitions aside; however, newspaper advertisements and editorial comments suggests she was not cut at all, at least not from the main release.
