= Georgia O'Ramey =

American actress (1883–1928)

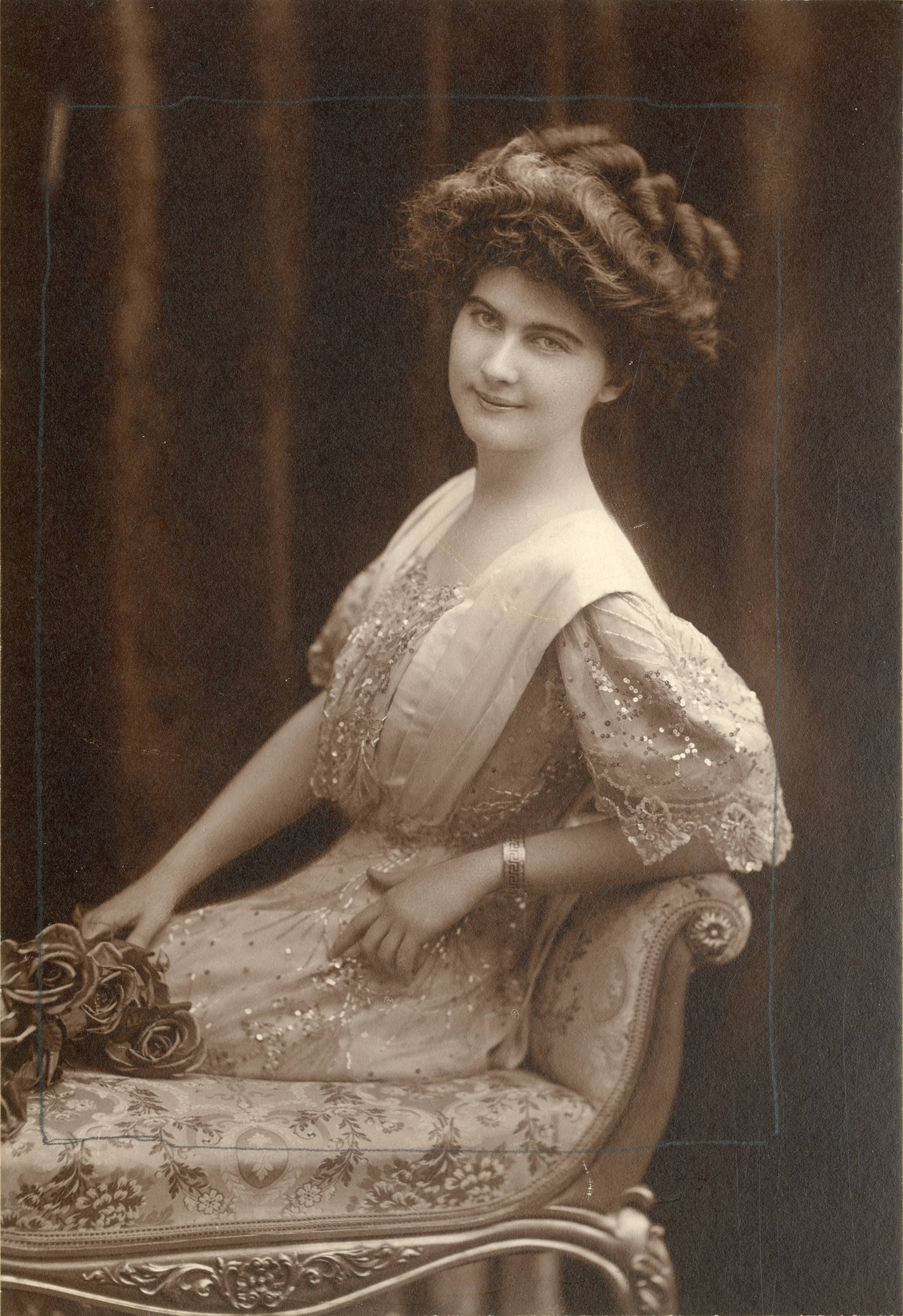
- O'Ramey c. 1909
- Born: January 1, 1883; Fredericktown, Ohio, U.S.
- Died: April 2, 1928 (aged 45); New Haven, Connecticut, U.S.
- Occupations: Actress, comedian
- Years active: 1908–1928
- Known for: Actress, vaudevillian
- Spouse: Robert B. Griffin (m. 1912, divorced)

Georgia O'Ramey (January 1, 1883 – April 2, 1928) was an American actress in comedies and musical theatre.

== Early life ==
O'Ramey was born in Fredericktown, Ohio to William B. O'Ramey and Emma Anquilla "Tude" Pearce. She attended Oberlin College.

== Career ==
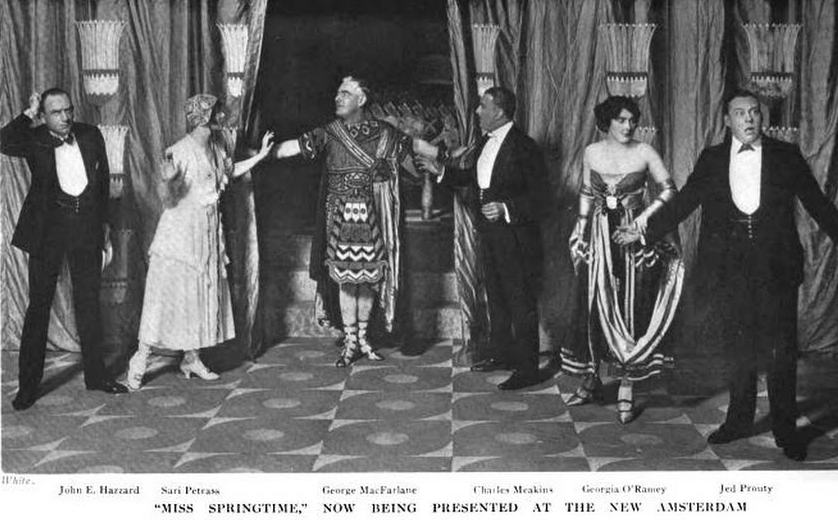
The cast of Miss Springtime, from a 1916 publication. Left to right: John E. Hazzard, Sari Petrass, George MacFarlane, Charles Meakins, Georgia O'Ramey, and Jed Prouty.

O'Ramey played violin in revues as a young woman. She acted, sang and danced regularly in Broadway musicals and comedies through the 1910s, with roles in the shows Lonesome Town (1906–1908), The Chaperon (1908–1909), Seven Days (1909–1910), The Point of View (1912), The Switchboard (1913), A Pair of White Gloves (1913), Dancing Around (1914–1915), Around the Map (1915–1916), Miss Springtime (1916–1917), Leave It to Jane (1917–1918), The Velvet Lady (1919), Daffy Dill (1922), Jack and Jill (1923), and No, No, Nanette (1925–1926).

O'Ramey appeared in one silent film, The $5,000,000 Counterfeiting Plot (1914). She also had stints in vaudeville. "Every day I am adding to my vaudeville vocabulary," she confessed in 1920, "and when I go back to the legitimate I am afraid my friends who have never been in vaudeville will not understand me." During World War I, she and her costar Oscar Shaw posed for photos to promote Liberty Loans.

== Personal life ==
O'Ramey married businessman Robert B. Griffin in 1912 in Greenwich, Connecticut. They later divorced. After weeks of headaches, she died suddenly on April 2, 1928 at a hotel in New Haven, Connecticut, just hours before the opening night of the show Nize Girl, in which she was to star. She was survived by her parents, her only known immediate survivors. Her obituary in the New York Times noted that she was "Distinguished on the American stage for a dozen years as one of the few woman comedians who could successfully sustain a broad burlesque role." The Baltimore Sun recalled as "one of the best of our woman clowns. In a fuller sense than many of the others, she had the comedy spirit." She left her estate to her parents and to the Actors Fund of America.
