= Helen Ware =

American actress (1877–1939)

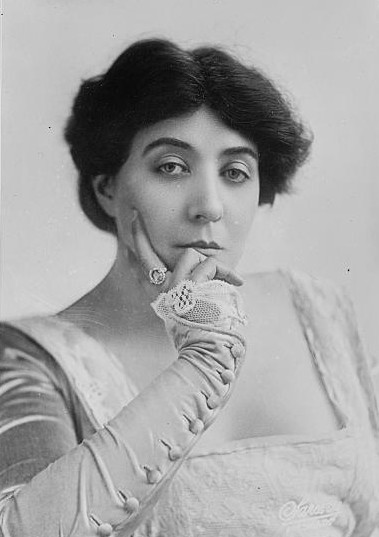
- Ware in 1909
- Born: Helen Remer; October 15, 1877; San Francisco, California, U.S.
- Died: January 25, 1939 (aged 61); Carmel, California, U.S.
- Occupation: Actress
- Years active: 1914–1935
- Spouse: Frederick Burt (1919–1939)

Helen Ware (née Remer; October 15, 1877 – January 25, 1939) was an American stage and film actress.

== Early years ==
Born to the architect John August Remer and Elinor Maria (née Ware), Ware adopted her mother's maiden name as her professional name. She had four siblings, Edith, Ada, Richard, and John Remer. Before becoming an actress, she worked as a governess and a swimming instructor.

== Career ==
Ware debuted on stage in 1899 when she was a student at the American Academy of Dramatic Arts. Along with other students, she was an extra in a production of The Little Minister.

She had a successful Broadway stage career making her first appearance in 1899 with Maude Adams, and by her 30s, she was playing the character parts for which she became famous. She began playing character parts in silent films in 1914 and continued into the sound era. Like Louise Closser Hale, Ware was a raven-haired woman for most of her stage career, but adopted an all-blond coif toward the late 1920s at the end of the silent era and into sound movies.

== Personal life ==
She married actor Frederick Burt (1876-1943) in 1919.

On January 25, 1939, Helen Ware died of a throat infection in Carmel, California, aged 61.

== Filmography ==
- Your Girl and Mine: A Woman Suffrage Play (1914)
- The Price (1915)
- Cross Currents (1915)
- Secret Love (1916)
- The Garden of Allah (1916)
- The Haunted Pajamas (1917)
- National Red Cross Pageant (1917) *Lost film
- Thieves' Gold (1918) *Lost film
- The Deep Purple (1920) *Undetermined/presumably lost
- Colorado Pluck (1921)
- Beyond the Rainbow (1922)
- Fascination (1922) *Undetermined/presumably lost
- Mark of the Beast (1923)
- Soul-Fire (1925)
- Napoleon's Barber (1928) *Lost film
- New Year's Eve (1929) *Lost film
- Speakeasy (1929) *Lost film, but the soundtrack survives
- The Virginian (1929) as Mrs. 'Ma' Taylor
- Half Way to Heaven (1929)
- Slightly Scarlet (1930)
- She's My Weakness (1930)
- Abraham Lincoln (1930)
- One Night at Susie's (1930)
- Tol'able David (1930)
- Command Performance (1931)
- Party Husband (1931)
- I Take This Woman (1931)
- The Reckless Hour (1931)
- The Night of June 13 (1931)
- Flaming Gold (1932)
- Ladies They Talk About (1933)
- Girl Missing (1933)
- The Keyhole (1933)
- The Warrior's Husband (1933)

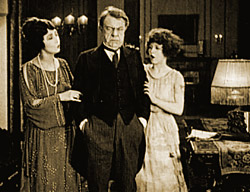
Ware on left with George Fawcett as her husband and Clara Bow as their daughter in Beyond the Rainbow 1922, Bow's first film

- She Had to Say Yes (1933)
- Morning Glory (1933)
- Sadie McKee (1934)
- That's Gratitude (1934)
- Secret of the Chateau (1934)
- Romance in Manhattan (1935)
- What's the Idea? (1935) *short

== Bibliography ==
- HELEN WARE TIRES OF THE STAGE: Says It Is Drudgery ... New York Times article dated Monday September 11, 1911
