= Marta Golden =

American actress

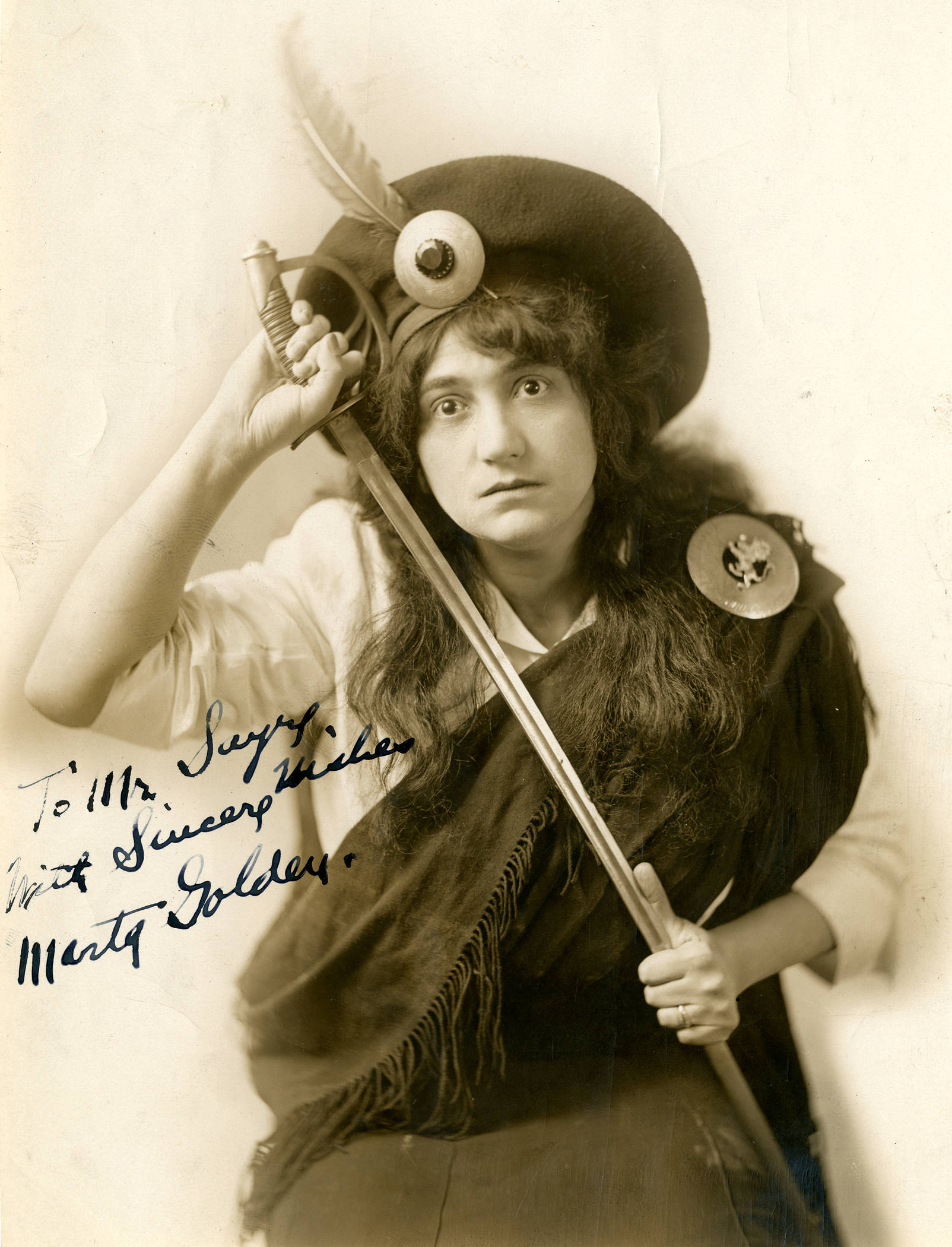
- Born: Lillian Marta Golden about 1880; Pennsylvania, US
- Died: January 2, 1940; San Francisco, California, US
- Other names: Marta Golden Duffy, Lillie Duffy
- Occupation: Actress
- Spouse: J. A. Raynes (m. 1910; div. 1915)

Lillian Marta Golden (about 1880 – January 2, 1940) was an American stage and film actress, writer, and vaudeville performer, associated with the films of Charlie Chaplin.

== Career ==
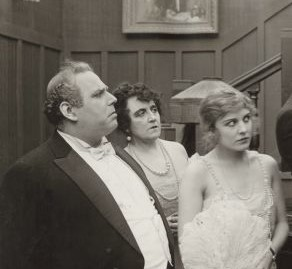
Marta Golden (center) in The Adventurer (1917)

=== Film ===
Golden made her film debut in the 1915 Charlie Chaplin-directed short Work. She appeared in approximately seven motion pictures, often in comedies directed and starring Chaplin. She recalled injuries while performing film stunts involving roller skates attached to her back, a head injury from a prop gun, underwater scrapes, cheese in her eyes, and hairpulling. Her last appearance in a motion picture was in the 1928 Edwin Carewe-directed drama Revenge, starring Dolores del Río.

=== Stage ===
Golden co-starred in a play in San Francisco in 1910. She co-led the Golden-Raynes musical comedy company with her first husband, J. A. Raynes; the troupe included Roscoe Arbuckle and Lon Chaney. She had "an exceedingly good program" when she performed in Honolulu in 1914; also in 1914, she took over a role in The Merry Gambol from Marie Dressler. She appeared on vaudeville programs in a musical comedy act with Truly Shattuck in 1916. During the 1918 flu pandemic, when the theaters in San Francisco were closed as a public health measure, Golden organized actresses to volunteer with the American Red Cross.

In the 1930s, Martha Golden Duffy was stage director at Westminster Avenue School in Venice, California, and organized vaudeville-style benefit shows.

=== Writing ===
Golden worked at the Pittsburgh Dispatch as a young woman, writing for the newspaper's women's page. She wrote a playlet, The Nut, which was produced at the Orpheum in Oakland in 1915. She also wrote and starred in The Pickpocket, performed by her own company in 1918, at San Francisco's Hippodrome. In 1927 she wrote a song, "I Wonder What the End Will Be." She wrote and starred in Good Night Nurse: A Satire on Eugenics, performed at the Westminster Avenue School in 1930. She wrote and starred in a one-act comedy, Neighbors, at Venice High School in 1931.

== Personal life ==
She married English-born composer and conductor John Arthur Raynes in 1910, and divorced him in 1915. She remarried to Charles Arthur Duffy in 1918; they adopted a daughter, Jean. Golden lived in Venice, California, in the late 1920s and 1930s. She died in San Francisco in 1940, at the age of 60.

== Filmography ==
Year	Title	Role	Notes
1915	Work	The Wife	Short, Uncredited
1915	A Woman	Her Mother	Short, Uncredited
1915	All Stuck Up	The Daughter	Short
1915	Crooked to the End		Short
1915	A Janitor's Wife's Temptation	The Janitor's Wife	Short
1917	The Adventurer	Mrs. Brown - Girl's Mother	Short, Uncredited
1928	Revenge	Leana	(final film role)
