= Fourteenth Street Theatre =

Theatre in Manhattan, New York (1866–1938)

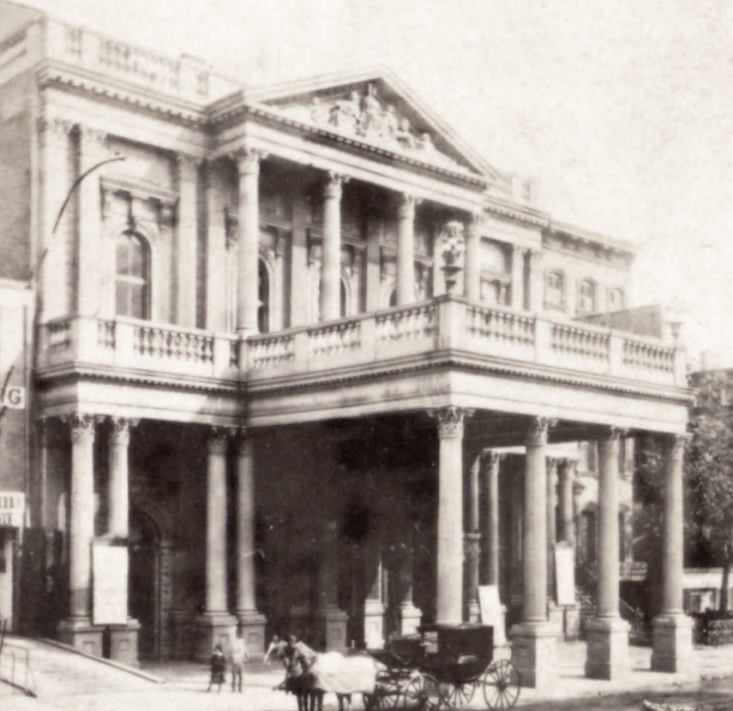
- The Lyceum Theatre c.1871, from a stereoscopic image

General information
- Architectural style: Neoclassical architecture
- Location: Manhattan, New York, US
- Coordinates: 40°44′16″N 73°59′50″W
- Opened: 1866
- Demolished: 1938

Design and construction
- Architect: Alexander Saeltzer

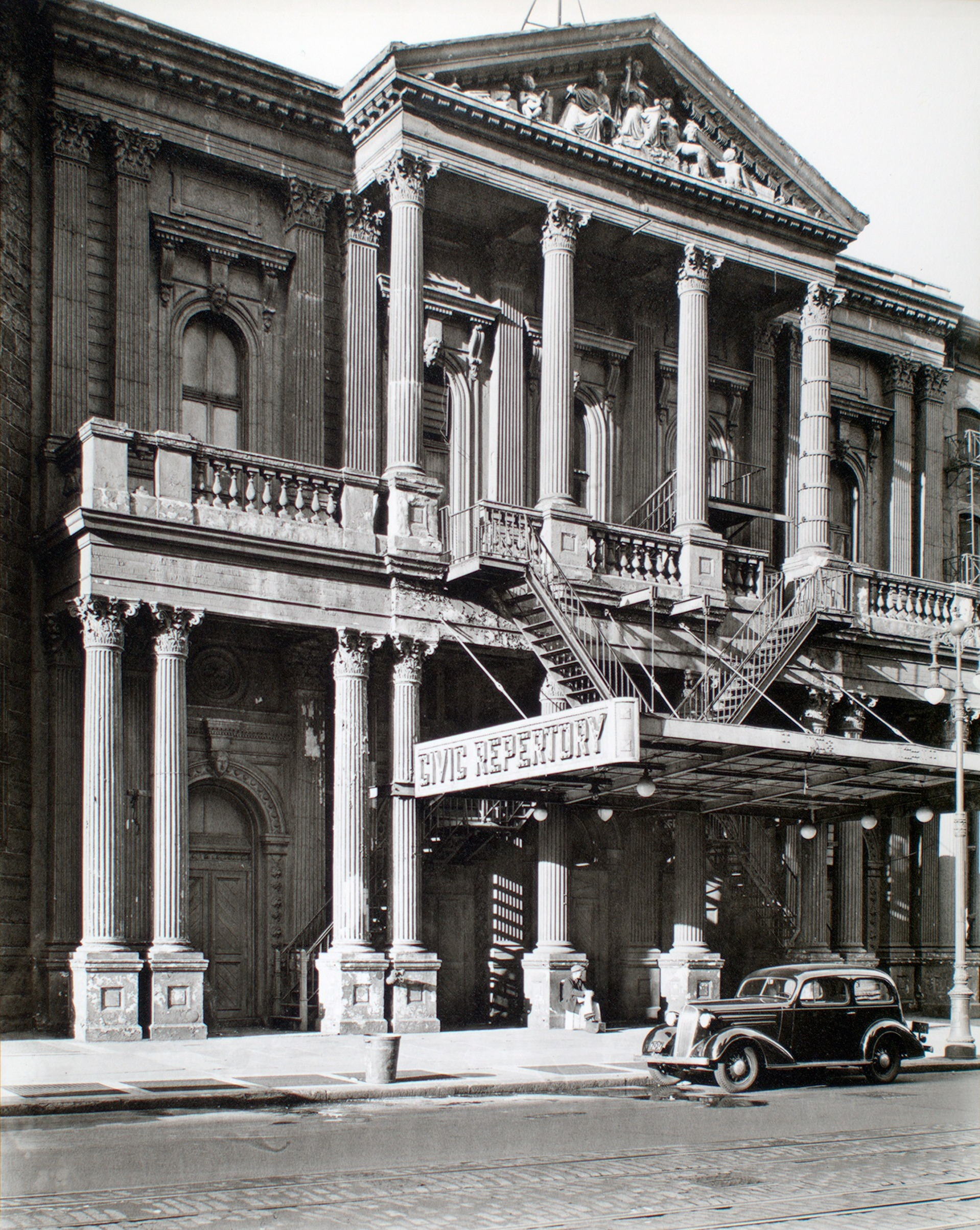
The theatre in 1936 with fire escapes added, photographed by Berenice Abbott

The Fourteenth Street Theatre was a theatre located at 107 West 14th Street just west of Sixth Avenue in Manhattan, New York City.

== History ==
It was designed by Alexander Saeltzer and opened in 1866 as the Theatre Français, as a home for French language dramas and opera.

The theatre was renamed the Lyceum in 1871. In 1879, it was taken over by producer J.H. Haverly, who renamed it Haverly's 14th Street Theatre. By the mid-1880s, it had become simply the Fourteenth Street Theatre.

By the mid-1910s, it was being used as a movie theatre. Actress Eva Le Gallienne made it the home of her stage company, renaming it the Civic Repertory Theatre in 1926. She conducted acting classes and mounted 34 successful productions at the theatre, but the Great Depression ended that venture in 1934.

The building was demolished in 1938.

== Selected productions ==
=== 14th Street Theatre ===
- Sam'l of Posen; or, The Commercial Drummer (1881)
- Evangeline! (1885–1886) (252 perf.)
- The Still Alarm (1887)
- The Old Homestead (1887, by George W. Ryer and Denman Thompson) (155 perf.)
- A Romance of Athlone (1889, 1890, by Chauncey Olcott)
- Blue Jeans (1890)
- Mavourneen (1891)
- Palmer Cox's Brownies (1894, by Palmer Cox and Malcolm Douglas) (98 perf.)
- The Errand Boy (1904)

=== Civic Repertory Theatre ===
- Alice in Wonderland (1932–33, adapted by Eva Le Gallienne) (127 perf.)
- Peace on Earth (1933–34, by George Sklar and Albert Maltz) (126 perf.)
- Waiting for Lefty (1935, by Clifford Odets)
- Let Freedom Ring (1935–36) (108 perf.)
