= The-Merry-Go-Round =

The-Merry-Go-Round was a musical vaudeville production that ran at the Circle Theatre on Broadway in 1908. The music was by Gus Edwards, with a book by Edgar Smith and lyrics by Paul West; it featured skits including "Stupid Mr. Cupid" by Theodore M. Morse and Edward Madden, "He's A-my Brud" by Fred Fisher and Jesse Lasky, and "The Shop Window Girls", with lyrics by Will D. Cobb. It was directed by George F. Marion with choreography by Joseph C. Smith. The musical takes place in Mineola, New York and New York City.
