= Kolb and Dill =

Vaudeville team founded by Clarence Kolb and Max Dill

Kolb and Dill was the stage name of the vaudeville team founded by Clarence Kolb and Max Dill.

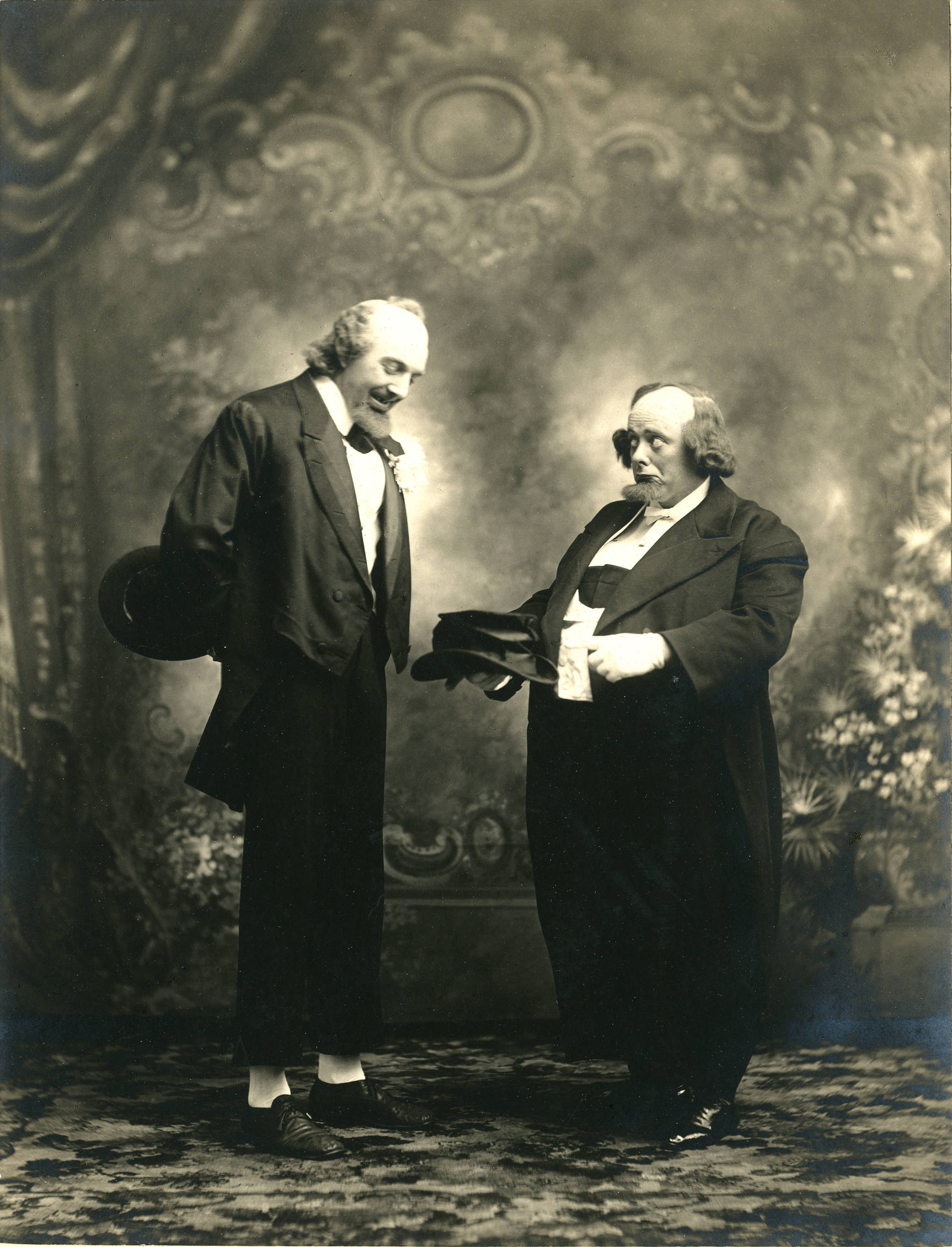

== Background ==
Kolb and Dill were born in Cleveland, Ohio, and were boyhood friends who decided to go into show business together. The book Vaudeville Old & New lists their prominence and earliest records dating to 1901.

== Early acts ==
The earliest newspaper mention highlights Kolb and Dill's act as part of a new bill at Cedar Point in Sandusky, Ohio, in 1899. On September 3, 1899, the Cedar Point listed a change in their bill which noted that "Ferrell and Starck, comedy trick bicyclists, always keep their audiences in a roar with their humorous act and will be complimented in their mirth-provoking efforts by Kolb and Dill, the German comedians." The ad on the fourth page of the paper, however, positioned their act over Ferrell and Starck and noted that the production would be a Sunday matinee and run daily for the week. The act they were performing was named "Together Side by Each" and described by the paper as "very funny" and noted that the bill listed some of the best performers of the vaudeville stage.

The Times of Philadelphia, Pennsylvania, featured an article on September 24, 1899, that noted Fred Irwin's "Majestic Burlesquers" were going to be performing at the Trocadero and that Kolb and Dill, billed as the German comedians, were a part of the act. Fred Irwin was a noted producer whose "Majestic Burlesquers" was new, but popular in December 1898. The performance at the Trocadero was noted as having "plenty to keep the large attendance fully entertained." Kolb and Dill would continue their act as it moved to the Star Theater in Brooklyn, New York. The Indianapolis News noted that the act had performed in the Empire theatre on February 5, 1900, again citing Kolb and Dill's continued role in the bill. A week later they were noted in Saint Louis, Missouri, on February 11, 1900. They had a performance at Sam T. Jack's Theater on March 4, 1900. The performance later moved to Kernan's Theater for a week of performances in mid-March. The "Majestic Burlesquers" would return to the Trocadero in May 1900.

By June 25, Kolb and Dill are no longer mentioned as part of Irwin's "Majestic Burlesquers" in an act at the Suburban. On July 1, the Inter-Ocean mentioned Kolb and Dill as part of another vaudeville act that would last for one week. The St Louis Republic compared Kolb and Dill's act to the Rogers Brothers, major rivals of Weber and Fields, on July 9, 1900, but did not elaborate on the act itself. Kolb and Dill performed as part of the reopening of the Hopkin's Theater. Kolb and Dill's act on the Hopkins was short with an ad lasting through about August 3 before they had an act at Sunnyside Park on August 5, 1900. Two more changes with venues, with the Chicago Opera House, Masonic Temple Theater, and Sans Souci occurred in mid-August. Kolb and Dill then went to Ohio in September and also performed an act at the Elk's Carnival, which the Elyria Republican highlighted the vaudeville act as the main feature and noted Kolb and Dill's status as well-known a German sketch team. Kolb and Dill then headed to San Francisco, California and took their act to the Orpheum on September 23, 1900. Kolb and Dill continued to perform at the Orpheum until at least October 4, before returning to Chicago's Hopkins theater in early November. In mid-December 1900, Kolb and Dill were listed as part of the Columbia Theater.

In January 1901, Kolb and Dill disbanded from their company and rejoined Fred Irwin's group for a performance on January 20, 1901. They did not stay long with Irwin's group and were in Keith's Theater in the beginning of February 1901. Though a week later the Order of White Rats of America began a strike and Kolb and Dill had sent word of their illness, along with others, announcing their inability to perform after the Sunday matinee at the Philadelphia Theater, but returned to the theater minutes before the 8 p.m. show. The Philadelphia Theater, part of the Keith's Theater circuit, was part of a larger threat to walk out that forced the management to set a meeting to discuss their grievances on the following day, February 8, 1901. On March 17, Kolb and Dill were again part of Fred Irwin's "Majestic Burlesquers" which were to perform for a week in the Trocado Theater. Kolb and Dill stayed with the "Majestic Burlesquers", but where noted to be starring in Fiddle Dee Dee in the next season whilst performing in Scranton, Pennsylvania. They would return to the Chicago theater in late May, but where not mentioned as part of Irwin's group. This performance was noted by the Chicago Daily Tribune as a "bad imitation of Weber & Fields".

== Acts ==
Newspaper accounts of Kolb and Dill next resurface on November 28, 1901, noting that Kolb and Dill were heading the Fiddle Dee Dee act by Weber & Fields. Fiddle Dee Dee was a major production which was popular enough to run 204 consecutive performances throughout the Pan-American Exposition and was declared Weber & Fields greatest success in an advertisement for Gilmore's Auditorium. Their performance was praised as the "unsophisticated Germans" as a role that was familiar to audiences of their other performances. Kolb and Dill's act would move to Chicago by mid-March 1902. Despite it not being the original company, Kolb and Dill's imitation of Weber and Fields was hailed as a good production. The act would move to San Francisco and play at the Fischer's theater on April 7, 1902.

On June 30, the San Francisco Chronicle referred to Kolb and Dill as the main attraction of the first act called "Pousse Cafe" and mentioned that the theater was packed with a large attendance. The act was unchanged until at least after August 3, Fischer's ads continued to highlight the popularity of the triple bill throughout July.

By August 31, the performance had changed again with Kolb and Dill in the two act performance of "Zaza" and "Hurly Burly". The two performances were again associated with Weber and Fields. The performance lasted through at least September 11. The act again would change to "Whirl-I-Gig" by October 6, and this act was noted for having good wordplay and Kolb and Dill performing a wooden shoe dance. The "Whirl-I-Gig" was joined by the act "Way Up East", on Richard Carle's "Way Down East". The "Way Up East" act was practiced from mid-to-late October before its debut at Fischer's theater on November 3. Kolb and Dill's role was described as being entirely different from those of the past. The act was noted to be quite popular and played through until at least mid-November, but probably until the end of November.

On December 1, a new act named "The Geezer" debuted, a parody on the popular "The Geisha", with Kolb playing the role of the Chinese "Geezer" named Li Hung Chang. The popular act would play throughout December and change over in on January 5, 1903. The new act was a parody on Clyde Fitch's Barbara Frietchie and written by Edgar and Harry B. Smith. The act focused around an election in Fredericksburg and included a parody on "Dixie" by Kolb and Dill. The production would last through at least January 19 when the next production, "Hoity Toiti" was announced in a Fischer's ad. This production had Kolb and Dill, along with Bernard, playing the role of banking businessmen who teach the art of poker playing. A production with Mrs. Charles W. Rhodes, had Kolb and Dill "be-Dutch" the act which featured Wagner on March 25 and April 4. The next production was "Helter Skelter" which was popular throughout mid-April, when the production of "Fiddle Dee-Dee" would return by popular demand. The "Fiddle Dee-Dee" production would last through the week of June 6, before "Twirly Whirly" would debut.

The "Twirly Whirly" production would be replaced by a combination of two great plays "Under the Red Globe" and "The Three Musketeers". Premiering on July 13, 1903, Kolb and Dill would have a song called "I'm Going to Live Anyhow Until I Die" that featured six clog dancers. Kolb and Dill also would sing "Soldiers" which was noted to be a "coon song". The quartet of comedians with Kolb, Dill, Bernard, and Whelan was noted to be "very funny". The performance would again change on August 10, with "The Big Little Princess" and "Quo Vass Iss". The production was quite popular and was advertised as having 1900 people pack the theater to view the performance on August 12. Kolb performed as "Specky" in "The Big Little Princess" and a strong man in "Quo Vass Iss" and Dill continued in the role of a Dutch comedian. The production lasted until September 7, when "The Con-Curers" and "The Glad Hand" debuted. A new performance would begin on October 5, "The Paraders", a musical comedy. A detailed account of the act in the San Francisco Chronicle highlighted that the production had a flimsy plot and was saved only by the personal experience of the actor themselves, Kolb, Dill and Bernard exhibited their usual horseplay and comedic act. Though its initial portrayal was negative, the Fischer Theater ad responded with an ad stating for people to read the criticisms and avoided the sharpest denouncements of the San Francisco Chronicle review. The Fischer's ad changed quickly, the criticism no longer called as such and quickly the quotes attributing this "criticism" were removed from the ads. The production did not last long and was replaced by "Rubes and Roses" on November 2. This act was also short-lived and was replaced by "I.O.U" on November 30. On December 12, it was noted that Kolb and Dill along with others from Fischer's would be departing before long, but "I.O.U" played through to at least the end of December with a special matinee on January 1, 1904. On January 7, it was announced that Kolb and Dill would finish their act at Fischer's at the end of the week and would prepare for to take their acts to Australia.

After the tour's announcement, Kolb and Dill were in another act by a local burlesque instead of a Weber and Field's imitation. Their roles in "The Beauty Shop" production, by J. P. Crawford, resulted in well-preserved details of the acts from the local newspapers. Kolb and Dill play the roles of C. Schwabber Pilsner and Jay Bierpump Culmbacher, president of the "Pretzel Trust". In a role reversal, Kolb was the fat man and Dill the thin man after being treated by the doctor Madame Voluptia in her establishment. The two emerge from sleeping in the "fat and anti-fat rooms of the parlor" when Dill focused on his feet and said that he had not seen them in years. Then Dill turned the tables on Kolb, kicking him and blurting out, "You did this to me for years; now I get back at you." The exact date of the production was most likely begun on Monday January 11, 1904 and was first advertised in the papers as a success by the Fischer theater on January 12. The production would change to "Roly Poly", described as an original production by Fischer's theater, on February 8, 1904. Kolb and Dill would see through the end of the production, with their final farewell performance on March 6 before the start of a new production. The next production, "The Rounders", featured the prominent Richard F. Carroll and John P. Kennedy as their replacements at Fischer's. One unique act performed by Kolb and Dill prior to their departure was a special "turn" and a comedic roast by the duo as part of performance with the California State Retail Association in the audience.

== 1904 Australian tour ==
On January 7, 1904, it was announced that Kolb and Dill would depart for a thirty-week tour of Australia with a company backed by Henry James. The group was known as the American Travesty Company. Kolb and Dill's contract included a salary and percentage basis, but exact details were not released in the San Francisco Chronicle. Kolb's wife, Charlotte Vidot, was also going to be a part of the trip. The tour was planned to leave the second week of May and include a two-week stop in Honolulu, Hawaii, before opening in Auckland, New Zealand, and moving on to Sydney, Australia. Later the trip was announced to include New Zealand. The acts on the tour were "Fiddle Dee-Dee", "Pousse Cafe", "Whirly Gig" (Whirl-I-Gig) and "Hoity Toity". After their final act on March 6, Kolb and Dill headed to New York only to return for more performances prior to their tour. Kolb and Dill returned on April 11 only to perform at the St. Mary's Alumni Concert in San Francisco's Alhambra Theater on April 12.

The production also held a two-week performance at the Grand Opera House, opening with "Hoity Toity" on April 17. The second week featured "Fiddle Dee-Dee" and "Whirl-I-Gig", before departing for Australia, though "Big Little Princess" was also added to the bill. Kolb and Dill's farewell act was on May 1 and they departed for Australia on May 5 on the Sierra at 2:10 p.m. heading to Honolulu.

== Popularity ==
On June 24, 1903, Kolb and Dill attended a boxing match to watch Jim Corbett fight Yank Kenny and Sam Berger; the theatrical celebrities' presence was prominently noted in the first paragraph of the article. Kolb and Dill's fame in traveling around the Midwest before staying at the Fischer's for three years was noted by a column in The Inter Ocean noting that Weber and Fields may not compare to Kolb and Dill's fame, despite having imitated their method and jokes, when the originals come to San Francisco. As evidence of their success, the February 8 debut of Weber and Fields act did not reduce Kolb and Dill in the opinion of the San Francisco Chronicle. The Oakland Tribute went further and bluntly stated, "Weber and Fields are not as good in "Dutch" farce as are Kolb and Dill at Fischer's in San Francisco."

== Musicals with J. A. Raynes ==
Kolb and Dill worked extensively with J. A. Raynes who served as both composer and conductor for the duo from 1898 through 1912. Raynes wrote the scores to several musicals crafted specifically for them in addition to creating music for their vaudeville sketches. This included the musical Lonesome Town which premiered in San Francisco in 1906 and then commenced a lengthy multi-year long tour that included a run at Broadway's Circle Theatre in 1908. Raynes' last collaboration with Kolb and Dill was the musical The Politicians for which he wrote the music and served as music director for performances in Los Angeles and San Francisco in 1912.
