= The Old Homestead (1915 film) =

1915 film by James Kirkwood

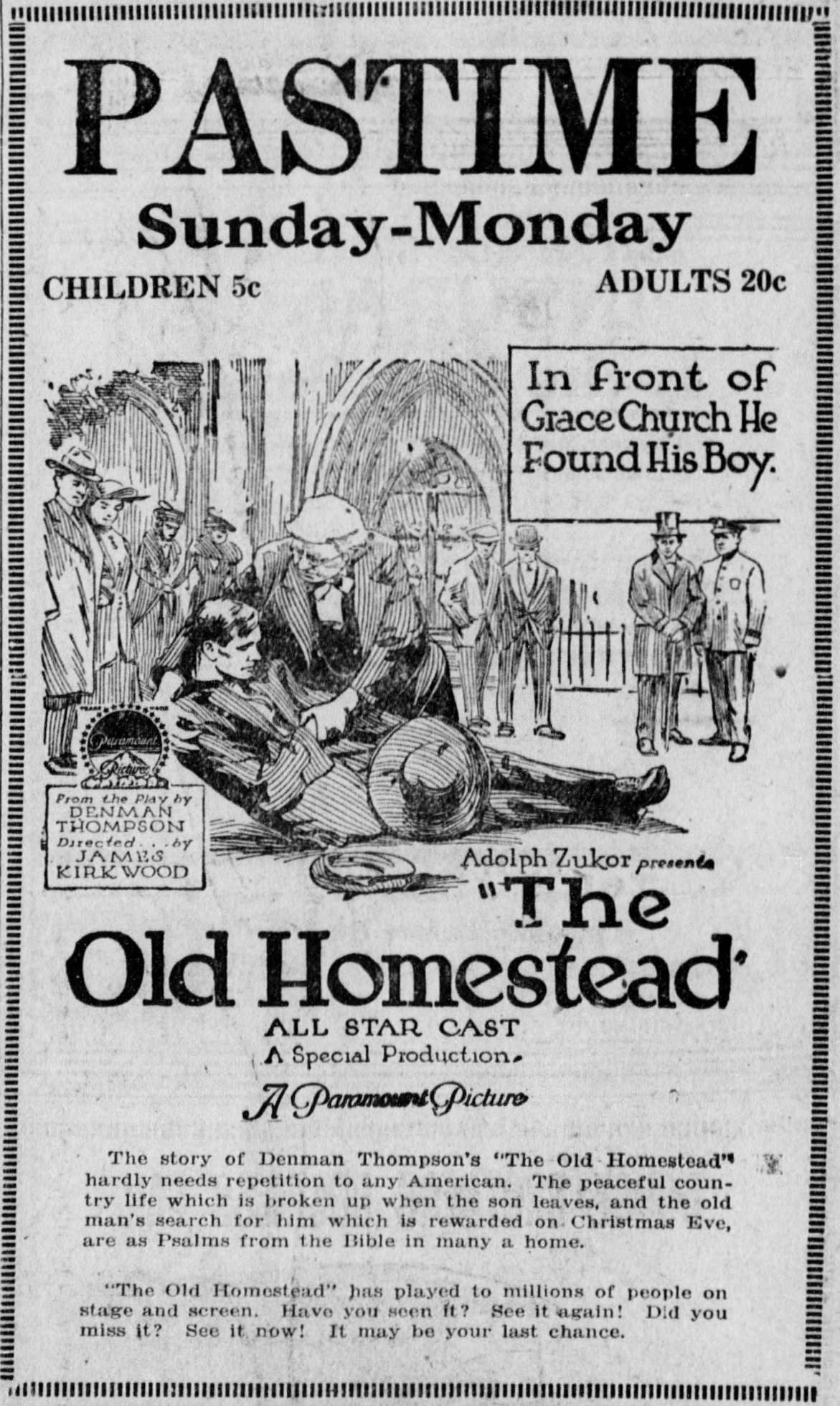
- Newspaper advertisement
- Directed by: James Kirkwood Sr.
- Screenplay by: Hugh Ford
- Based on: The Old Homestead by George W. Ryer and Denman Thompson
- Produced by: Daniel Frohman
- Starring: Frank Losee; Creighton Hale; Denman Maley; Louise Huff; Mrs. Corbett; Horace Newman
- Production company: Famous Players Film Company
- Distributed by: Paramount Pictures
- Release date: December 26, 1915
- Running time: 50 minutes
- Country: United States
- Language: Silent (English intertitles)

The Old Homestead is a surviving 1915 American silent comedy film directed by James Kirkwood Sr.. The screenplay by Hugh Ford was based on the play The Old Homestead by George W. Ryer and Denman Thompson. The film stars Frank Losee, Creighton Hale, Denman Maley, Louise Huff, Mrs. Corbett and Horace Newman. The film was released on December 26, 1915, by Paramount Pictures.

The movie is based on the popular 19th-century play of the same name by Denman Thompson. The play revolved around the character Joshua Whitcomb, a folksy New England farmer created and often portrayed on the stage by Thompson. In this film, however, the character is called Josiah Whitcomb.

== Cast ==
- Frank Losee as Josiah Whitcomb
- Creighton Hale as Reuben Whitcomb
- Denman Maley as Jack Hazzard
- Louise Huff as Ruth Stratton
- Mrs. Corbett as Aunt Tildy
- Horace Newman as Cy
- Tom Wood as Seth
- Margaret Seddon as Rickety Ann
- Russell Simpson as Sheriff
- Rose Linden as the extra

== Preservation status ==
- A copy is preserved by Lobster Films.
