= The Old Homestead (1922 film) =

1922 film by James Cruze

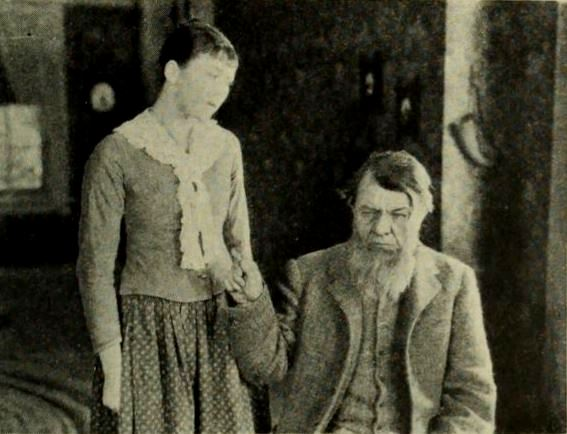
- Fritzi Ridgeway and George Fawcett
- Directed by: James Cruze
- Screenplay by: Julien Josephson (scenario); Perley Poore Sheehan (story); Frank E. Woods (story)
- Based on: The Old Homestead by George W. Ryer and Denman Thompson
- Produced by: Jesse L. Lasky
- Starring: Theodore Roberts; George Fawcett; T. Roy Barnes; Fritzi Ridgeway; Harrison Ford; James Mason; Kathleen O'Connor
- Cinematography: Karl Brown
- Production company: Famous Players–Lasky Corporation
- Distributed by: Paramount Pictures
- Release date: October 8, 1922
- Running time: 80 minutes
- Country: United States
- Language: Silent (English intertitles)

The Old Homestead is a 1922 American silent drama film directed by James Cruze and written by Julien Josephson, Perley Poore Sheehan, and Frank E. Woods based upon the play of the same name by George W. Ryer and Denman Thompson. The film stars Theodore Roberts, George Fawcett, T. Roy Barnes, Fritzi Ridgeway, Harrison Ford, James Mason, and Kathleen O'Connor. The film was released on October 8, 1922, by Paramount Pictures.

== Plot ==
As described in a film magazine review, the village vamp induces the town weakling, who works in the general store, to steal for her. Suspicion of the crimes fall upon Reuben Whitcomb, the son of Uncle Joshua, and he flees from town. The storekeeper, who holds a mortgage on Uncle Joshua's house, has decided to put it under the auction hammer because the mortgage cannot be paid off. Through a round of dramatic events the facts are revealed as they actually are, and everything turns out happy to all involved.

== Cast ==
- Theodore Roberts as Uncle Joshua Whitcomb
- George Fawcett as Eph Holbrook
- T. Roy Barnes as Happy Jack
- Fritzi Ridgeway as Ann
- Harrison Ford as Reuben Whitcomb
- James Mason as Lem Holbrook
- Kathleen O'Connor as Rose Blaine
- Ethel Wales as Aunt Matilda
- Ed Brady as Ike Goodsell
- Frank Hayes as Si Prime
- Z. Wall Covington as Seth Perkins
- Charles Williams as Gabe Waters

== Preservation ==
A print of The Old Homestead is in the Gosfilmofond film archive in Russia.
