= The Old Homestead (1935 film) =

1935 film

- Theatrical poster
- Directed by: William Nigh
- Written by: Scott Darling
- Based on: The Old Homestead by George W. Ryer and Denman Thompson
- Produced by: M.H. Hoffman
- Cinematography: Harry Neumann
- Edited by: Mildred Johnston
- Music by: Howard Jackson (uncredited)
- Distributed by: Liberty Pictures
- Release date: October 5, 1935
- Running time: 73 minutes
- Country: United States
- Language: English

The Old Homestead is a 1935 American romantic western musical film directed by William Nigh.

== Cast ==
- Mary Carlisle ... Nancy Abbott
- Lawrence Gray ... Bob Shackleforth
- Willard Robertson ... Uncle Jed
- Dorothy Lee ... Elsie Wilson
- Edward J. Nugent ... Rudy Nash (as Eddie Nugent)
- Lillian Miles ... Peggy
- Fuzzy Knight ... Lem
- Eddie Kane ... Mr. Wertheimer
- Harry Conley ... J. Wilberforce Platt, Press Agent
- Tim Spencer ... Vern, Member of Sons of the Pioneers (as Vern Spencer)
- Bob Nolan ... Bob, Member of Sons of the Pioneers
- Roy Rogers ... Len, Member of Sons of the Pioneers
- Hugh Farr ... Hugh, Member of Sons of the Pioneers
- Sally Sweet ... Singer

== Critical reception ==
Variety wrote that although the storyline "charts no original paths", and the dialogue "makes no pretensions to brilliance", the film was "a clean, innocuous picture, with good music and production stature."
