= The Elect Lady =

The Elect Lady is an 1888 novel by George MacDonald.

The story is centered upon three main characters: Andrew, a poor, scholarly, godly man; Dawtie, a simple servant girl who cares for animals; and Alexa, the landlord's daughter and the landlord himself.
