= Circle Theatre (Broadway) =

Former theatre in Manhattan, New York

Coordinates: 40°46′8″N 73°58′57.5″W

The Circle Theatre was a Broadway theatre, concert hall, movie theatre, and venue for vaudeville and burlesque located at the corner of Broadway and West 60th Street. It was the first theatre built in the Columbus Circle area of Manhattan. Its address was 1825 Broadway.

== History ==
The Circle Theatre was initially envisioned by Charles Evans and W.D. Mann to be a theatre for vaudeville and burlesque entertainments. They hired architect Charles Cavenaugh to design the theatre and it was built in 1901. Moral opposition from the nearby St. Paul the Apostle Church, however, forced Evans and Mann to change the offerings of the theatre to one of more refined entertainment. Accordingly, the theatre opened as the Circle Music Hall and served as a venue for orchestra concerts in its early years.

After losing money as a venue for classical music, the Circle Theatre began to present vaudeville entertainments in 1902 under the name the Circle Theatre. In 1905 it became a burlesque house operated by the Columbia Amusement Company. It was later re-designed by architect Thomas W. Lamb in 1906 and converted into a legitimate theater for musicals. It operated as a theatre for Broadway musicals for the next several years with its last legitimate staging being a revival of The Chocolate Soldier in October 1910. After this, the theatre was used for vaudeville and burlesque before it was purchased by the Loews movie theatre chain and converted into a movie theatre. It operated as a movie theatre until 1935 when it was bombed in a labor dispute. In 1939 the building was converted into the Columbus Circle Roller Rink. The building was demolished in 1954 to make way for the New York Coliseum.

== Notable productions ==
- The-Merry-Go-Round (1908)
- Lonesome Town (1908)
- In Hayti (1909)
