= Indian Summer (Howells novel) =

1886 novel by William Dean Howells

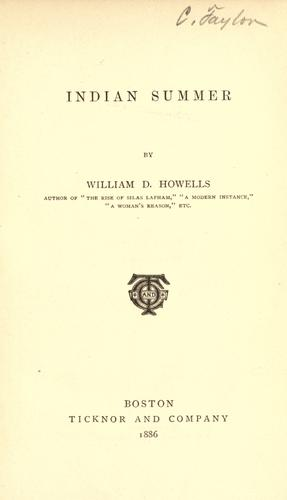
Indian Summer, published by Ticknor and Company, 1886

Indian Summer is an 1886 novel by William Dean Howells. Though it was published after The Rise of Silas Lapham, it was written before The Rise of Silas Lapham. The setting for this novel was inspired by a trip Howells had recently taken with his family to Europe.

Howells was a realist writer who wanted "his characters to be honest, ordinary people, as he might find in his strata of society, flawed and well-meaning, good-hearted and self-effacing, bound by the conventions and the restrictions of their day but quietly dreaming of a little local heroism in their souls." All of this is encompassed in the character Theodore Colville.

== Plot summary ==
Theodore Colville is a respected newspaperman in Des Vaches, Indiana. He is the editor of the Democratic-Republican, which he bought from his brother. But after a bad political move his fans criticize him and his pride cannot withstand that. A new opposing newspaper is made and Colville decides to just give up the newspaper business so he sells his newspaper to the new paper. They merge to become the Post Democratic-Republican. Colville decides that he needs to take a long vacation so he travels to Florence.

Colville hasn't been in Florence in almost 20 years. At that time he was a young architect "with an inclination toward the literary side of his profession". He travelled all over Italy and in Venice he met a young American girl whom he followed to Florence. In Florence Jenny Wheelwright broke Theodore Colville's heart. He was distraught so when his brother wrote to him to come to Des Vaches, Colville happily accepted the offer for a change in scenery. In Des Vaches he got drawn into the newspaper business, which he happily stayed in for 15 years. In Florence he runs into a person he wasn't eager to ever see again: Mrs. Bowen. Mrs. Bowen, whom he once knew as Lina Ridgely, was best friends with Jenny, the girl who broke Colville's heart 20 years prior. She is a widow and has a young daughter Effie Bowen. They have a surprisingly pleasant chat and she invites him to a gathering at her home, Palazzo Pinti, that evening. He accepts the invitation.

Colville hasn't done much socializing but at the gathering he falls right into it nicely. When he comes in he notices a beautiful, young, blonde girl that's about twenty and asks Mrs. Bowen to introduce him to her. Her name is Imogene Graham and she is staying with Mrs. Bowen that winter.

At last Mrs. Bowen takes Colville to meet Miss Graham. She is with a young clergyman, Mr. Morton, whom Mrs. Bowen drags away. Miss Graham and Colville have a pleasant chat. After all the guests leave Colville stays behind to sit with Mrs. Bowen, Miss Graham, and young Effie by the fire. Effie, Mrs. Bowen's young daughter, is enchanted with Colville. Before Colville bids the women good night, Mrs. Bowen tells him he is welcome to drop by anytime.

On Thursday, the day Mrs. Bowen receives guests, Colville comes by the Palazzo Pinti. Unfortunately, Mrs. Bowen has a headache and won't come down to greet the guests. But after all the guests leave and she hears Colville's voice, she does come down to greet him. They invite Colville to a dance party the next night, and he accepts the invitation. The next night, Colville picks up the women to go to Madame Uccelli's dance party. Miss Graham is a wonderful dancer and makes Colville dance the Lancers. Unfortunately Colville is awful at Lancers and makes a fool of himself. He doesn't dance for the rest of the night.

The next day he runs into Miss Graham and Effie and stops to socialize with them. Effie is enchanted with Colville and Miss Graham finds him very droll. While they converse, Miss Graham begins to develop a crush on Colville and Colville, though he finds her charming and beautiful, cannot help but notice their age gap. Miss Graham talks to Mrs. Bowen about how pleasant Colville is but Mrs. Bowen reminds her that Colville is twice her age. Colville has nicely integrated into society thanks to the Bowens and often attends parties. He has also become good friends with Rev. Mr. Waters whom he met at the first gathering in the Palazzo Pinti.

This time is the time of the Carnival and people are dressed in all kinds of custom. Mrs. Bowen doesn't approve of the carnival but believes that Miss Graham should experience it. From then on Colville becomes a common guest of the Bowens and every time he comes over he brings the women flowers and a little gift for Effie. He begins to spoil Effie and he enamors the child. Colville invites the women to the veglione and they accept. They go out shopping for dominos and masks and the saleswoman mistakes Colville to be Effie's father but no one feels the need to correct her. At the veglione, Mrs. Bowen does not allow them to dance with any of the unfamiliar people. They run into Mr. Waters who suggest that they can still dance within the group. Colville and Miss Graham dance the waltz. Mrs. Bowen doesn't seem too happy about this. Colville and Miss Graham have a romantic moment as they dance. When they get back to where they left Mrs. Bowen and Effie, the mother and child are nowhere in sight. Miss Graham doesn't mind being left alone with Colville but Colville seems eager to find Mrs. Bowen and Effie. Someone informs them that the child wasn't feeling well so mother and daughter left. Colville and Miss Graham rush home but Effie seems to be doing okay.

The next day Colville comes to check on Effie. He apologizes to Mrs. Bowen for his actions the previous night; he should not have left Mrs. Bowen. She forgives him but he doesn't feel like she has truly forgiven him. She leaves and Effie comes and sits on Colville's lap and he tells her Florentine fairy tales. When he leaves Mrs. Bowen talks to Miss Graham and tells her that as her surrogate mother for that winter she feels responsible to advice the girl if she becomes interested in a man who unintentionally will make her unhappy. They both know she is talking about Colville. Then Mrs. Bowen takes everything she says to Miss Graham back and rushes out of the room.

The next day Colville attends a reception in hopes of running into Mrs. Bowen. He searches for her but he only finds Miss Graham. Miss Graham says something insensitive to Colville, which he knows didn't actually come from her but from Mrs. Bowen. She says that he is amusing himself with her. He is disturbed by such an assumption by Mrs. Bowen that he storms out of the reception. He goes to the Palazzo Pinti and confronts Mrs. Bowen and she responds to him truthfully that it was she who had put this idea in the young girls head. She is harsh with Colville. Colville suggests that it must be best if he leaves Florence and she agrees.

Colville rushes back to the hotel where he is staying and begins to pack. He plans to take the 7 pm train to Rome. He realizes he doesn't have enough money with him to pay the landlord or the train. It is Saturday afternoon and the banks are closed and won't be open until Monday. Rev. Mr. Waters comes by but unfortunately he doesn't make a habit of carrying money with him so he doesn't have enough to help Colville. Colville must delay his leave until Monday. He goes for a walk and when he comes back there is a letter for him.

At the same time Colville is packing to leave, at Palazzo Pinti the women are distressed. Miss Graham is weeping because she thinks Colville leaving is her doing. Mrs. Bowen is also upset because she didn't mean for it to go this far. Finally Mrs. Bowen decides to write Colville a letter stating that there is no need for him to leave and invites him to lunch the following day to put everything behind them. This is the letter Colville receives when he gets back from his walk. He declines the invitation because he truly feels it was best if he left Florence.

The next day he decides to visit the Boboli Gardens where he runs into Miss Graham, Effie Bowen, and Mrs. Amsden. Effie holds his hand as he talks with Mrs. Amsden but Miss Graham holds back. When Miss Graham goes to see the flowers alone with Colville she begs him not to go, admits her feelings for him and explains the whole misunderstanding with what Mrs. Bowen had said. They confess their like for each other and Colville decides to stay.

Mrs. Bowen is glad Colville is staying but she doesn't seemed pleased with the reason. She becomes cold toward Imogene. Effie is happy that he is staying because she loves him as a father figure. Mrs. Bowen tells Miss Graham that it is her responsibility to write to her mother about Miss Graham's engagement with Colville. Imogene tells Colville that even if her family refuses she will keep her promise to stay with him because she loves him. Colville says she is free to do whatever she pleases, that she should not feel bound to him.

Miss Graham tries to involve Colville more into the society by making him attend more parties and visit ladies on their days of visitation. This new routine tires Colville and whenever he sits down he falls asleep because the day's and night's events have worn him out. She also makes him change his clothing to a younger more fashionable look. But Imogene realizes that this lifestyle does not suit Colville and tells him he doesn't need to do it anymore. This also makes Miss Graham realize their age difference again.

On their way back from a visit to Fiesole, they get into a wreck. But before the wreck Colville frantically helps get Mrs. Bowen and Effie out of the car. Imogene notices that he helped them before her so she doesn't let him help her. Instead she lets Mr. Morton, the young clergyman, help her off the carriage. Colville tries to control the horse and crashes. Colville wakes up later in a bed. He had a bad crash and has broken bones and his head has been hit. As he drifts in and out of sleep he notices Mrs. Bowen and Effie's company but not much of Imogene. Her mother is in town and Imogene is staying with her at the hotel until Colville is well and they can come talk to him.

Mrs. Graham informs Colville that her daughter Imogene has realized after the accident that she isn't really in love with him. He understands perfectly because he too realizes he isn't really in love with her either. It is a peaceful break up.

Colville is getting used to the comfort of Palazzo Pinti but he knows he must leave before he gets too accustomed to the hospitality. He loves being at the Palazzo Pinti with Mrs. Bowen and Effie, but he knows he must go back to the hotel.

While talking to Mr. Waters he realizes that he is in love with Mrs. Bowen and has been since he first arrived in Florence that winter. He goes to see Mrs. Bowen and confesses his love to her. She says she loves him also but refuses his marriage proposal. He suggests that it might be better if he leaves Florence, and she agrees. But before he leaves, Effie arrives, and when she finds out he is leaving, she bursts into tears, so Mrs. Bowen tells him not to go.

In June, Mrs. Bowen becomes Mrs. Colville. Effie is happy to have Colville as a stepfather. The family moves to Rome.

== Setting ==
The story mainly takes place in Florence. The main parts of Florence that are mentioned are the Lung'Arno, Cascine, and the Boboli Gardens. Palazzo Pinti is the Bowens' home in Florence. The idea for the Palazzo Pinti may have come from a real Renaissance palace in Florence, the Palazzo Pitti. Fiesole, a town in the province of Florence, is also mentioned. This is where they have the wreck that makes Miss Graham realize she's not in love with Colville, because he cares more for Mrs. Bowen and Effie.

Des Vaches, Indiana is where Colville went to forget his broken heart by focusing on the newspaper business.

== Major characters ==
Theodore Colville

• Main character • Middle-aged (41) • Has an architecture degree • Born in Rhode Island • Has a wealthy older brother in Des Vaches, Indiana • Editor of popular newspaper Democratic-Republican for 15 years • In early 20s; had his heart broken in Florence by Jenny Wheelwright • Marries Evalina Ridgely and becomes stepfather to Effie Bowen

Mrs. Bowen/ Lina Ridgely / Evalina Bowen

• Was best friends with Jenny Wheelwright • Has a young daughter Effie • Widow: husband was leading lawyer in her Western City and was in Congress • Is in Europe for daughter's education • Middle-aged but still very beautiful • Well respected in Florence society • From Columbus, Ohio • Lives in Palazzo Pinti in Florence • Brunette

Imogene Graham

• Young American woman of about 20 • From Buffalo • Blonde with dark eyes • Very beautiful and intelligent • Staying with Mrs. Bowen for the winter

Effie Bowen

• Daughter of Mrs. Bowen • About ten years old

Rev. Mr. Waters

• Met Colville at the first gathering at Palazzo Pinti • American from Haddam East Village, Massachusetts • Becomes good friend of Colville • Old retired reverend, spending his last days in Florence

Mr. Morton

• Young clergyman in love with Miss Graham

Jenny Milbury / Jenny Wheelwright

• Woman who broke Colville's heart when he was young • Best friends with Lina Ridgely back in those times

== Theme/symbols ==
=== Electra complex ===
As noted by John Updike in the New York Review of Books: "The novel examines a sexual triangle, with variations on the Oedipal triangle." Mrs. Bowen is acting as Miss Graham's surrogate mother abroad. When Miss Graham and Colville begin to develop a romance Mrs. Bowen starts acting coldly toward Miss Graham. Colville unconsciously is always trying to satisfy Mrs. Bowen and Imogene notices this and begins to hate Mrs. Bowen in what seems like an Electra complex.

=== Seasons ===
The seasons play an important symbolic role in the novel. When Colville was young and in love with Jenny Wheelwright it was fall. But his love begins to die like the trees transitioning from fall to winter. Colville's love life follows the pattern of the seasons: "Except that this had happened in the fall, and now it was early spring, there seemed no change since then; the long years that had elapsed were like a winter between." The event in the fall was his romance with Jenny Wheelwright and the same type of romance is happening now with the young Imogene Graham. The winter in between was the time spent in Des Vaches where his only interest was the newspaper business. The romantic part of his life was as dead as the foliage in winter. But in his return to Florence, the women in his life start melting the coldness in his heart, and love begins to blossom again in his life. At the peak of spring, when the flora have matured to full blossom, Colville recognizes his love for Mrs. Bowen and she confesses her love for him. Finally when we arrive at summer, Colville marries Evalina. All the ice has melted and he is finally married to the woman he truly loves.

=== Age ===
"This is a novel that is profoundly concerned with the different stages of humankind." Through the different characters, Colville is able express parts of himself. With Effie he can be immature and childish, free of all the social constraints of being a grown up. Imogene Graham gives him a taste of the youthful excitement of discovering new things about the world. Mrs. Bowen is part of his midlife crisis; he wants to live out his youthful romance but Mrs. Bowen reminds of him of where he is in life. The wisdom of age is embodied in Rev. Mr. Waters.

== Title ==
An Indian summer is a brief period of warm weather in autumn, or metaphorically, a brief revival or seeming revival of a waning era. The term originated in the United States, though it is occasionally used in Britain. The equivalent of the term in Italy is 'Estate di San Martino' but this refers to a holiday (which occurs around the same time Indian summers can happen in America), and not to the weather. Howells may have used the phrase to compare the lives of Americans in America and expatriates in Europe. Americans' life in Italy is a holiday, not real, working life. As John Updike wrote: "[Henry] James's expatriates are seeking and losing their souls abroad; Howells's are on holiday."

== Critical reception ==
Howells considered Indian Summer one of his best books and one of the best character studies he had written.

In a letter to Howells, Mark Twain wrote "But what I started to say, was, that I have just read Part II of Indian Summer, and to my mind there isn't a waste line in it, or one that could be improved. I read it yesterday, ending with that opinion; and read it again to-day, ending with the same opinion emphasized."

== Publication ==
• Serialized in Harper's Monthly from July 1885 through February 1886
• Ticknor and company, 1886
• Houghton, Mifflin, 1914
• Indiana University Press, 1971
