= The Two Sisters (play) =

The Two Sisters is a play by Denman Thompson and George W. Ryer. It was inspired by Paul Giroux's painting Les Deux Soeurs, and was staged on Broadway at the Theatre Comique and Niblo's Garden in 1888.

== Plot ==
Sisters Mary and Martha Howard are from rural New Hampshire and come to New York City to seek a better life. Mary obtains employment as the servant in the home of a wealthy respectable family, and ultimately meets and marries Hiram Pepper, a well-off gentleman from the Pacific Coast of the United States who has relocated to New York. Martha, however, falls victim to an unscrupulous but charismatic man, Harry Horton, who becomes her lover and entangles her in a web of deception and a series of betrayals that ultimately engulf them both in tragedy. Harry murders his father and commits suicide. Martha's reputation and situation are saved by Hiram and Mary who come to her aid.

== Original cast ==
Cast

- May Merrick as Mary Howard
- Lavinia White as Martha Howard
- Frank Mordaunt as Hiram Pepper
- Myron Calice as Harry Horton
- Joe Baptiste La Flamme as T. H. Gray
- Master J. W. Porter as Bolivar
- A. J. Leavitt as Captain of Precinct
- Charles W. Swain as Billy, the Baker
- W. H. Pendergast as Hawkins, the policeman

== Performance history ==
The Two Sisters was given its premiere at the Boston Theatre on Labor Day 1888, but subsequently underwent significant rewrites of its final act that were overseen by Ryer. It subsequently toured in 1888 to the Chestnut Street Opera House in Philadelphia and the Amphion Academy in Brooklyn before transferring to Broadway in November 1888, where it played first at the Theatre Comique and then Niblo's Garden. Eugene Jepson had taken over the role of Hiram Pepper by the time the production was running on Broadway. In 1901 the play was part of the repertoire of David Belasco's stock theatre company at the Central Theatre in San Francisco. The play continued to be revived in American regional theatre productions until as late as 1905 when it was staged at The Music Hall in Portsmouth, New Hampshire.
