= The Old Homestead (play) =

The Old Homestead is a play by Denman Thompson and George W. Ryer. A drama set in rural New Hampshire and in Manhattan, it premiered at the Boston Theatre on April 5, 1886, with Thompson starring as Joshua Whitcomb. The play was highly successful, and Thompson continued to perform regularly in this role on tour through 1910. It was first staged on Broadway at the Lyceum Theatre in 1887, and then repeated in annual revivals on the New York stage from 1888 to 1891. The show was subsequently revived multiple times in New York, including in 1913 at the Manhattan Opera House after both Thompson and Ryer had died. The play was adapted into silent films in 1915 (directed by James Kirkwood Sr.) and 1922 (directed by James Cruze). In 1935 a sound film adaptation was made by director William Nigh.
