= J. A. Raynes =

English-born American musician (born 1870)

John Arthur Raynes, more commonly referred to as J. A. Raynes, (born 1870 – died sometime after 1916) was an English-born American composer, conductor, songwriter, music arranger, and organist. He is best known for his contributions to Broadway musicals as a composer and arranger. He was also a Tin Pan Alley songwriter during the first decade of the 20th century and in 1915-1916 was active in Los Angeles as a composer of music accompaniments to silent films.

== Life and career ==
John Arthur Raynes was born in Liverpool, England in 1870. He immigrated to the United States in 1885 and initially settled in Steubenville, Ohio where he was organist and choirmaster at St. Paul's Episcopal Church and music director of both the London Theatre and City Opera House. There he married his first wife Martha Irene Beazeall on 7 July 1892. He later married the actress Marta Golden in 1910 in San Jose, California. They divorced in 1915.

Raynes first came to prominence as a composer writing the score to the musical burlesque Little Casino which premiered at the roof performance space of Broadway's Casino Theatre on 2 August 1897. He then was hired by Bob Cole to work as the musical director and arranger for his musical At Jolly Coon-ey Island; beginning an international tour of that work in March 1898. After this he worked in vaudeville as the music director for Kolb and Dill, and he wrote the score to a Broadway musical starring this duo, Lonesome Town (1908). He continued to tour nationally as conductor and composer with Kolb and Dill through 1912; also writing the score to the musical The Politicians (1912) for the pair.

Raynes was also active as a songwriter for Tin Pan Alley as both a composer and lyricist. His song output included "The Suburban: Characteristic March and Two-Step” (1902, music by Raynes); “Helen of Helena” (1906, music by Raynes, lyrics by Howard Herrick), “The Feegee Man” (1907, words and music by Raynes), "Easy Money" (1908, words and music by Raynes), "I Only Thought I'd Ask You" (music by Raynes, lyrics by Edward Boltwood), "Flirting" (music by Raynes and lyrics by Leo Curley), "Katy Strauss" (1909, words and music by Raynes), and "My Little Cousin" (1910, words and music by Raynes.

The last known activities of Raynes was in 1915–1916 as a composer of theatre organ music in Los Angeles for use in silent film theaters. His film music commissions included works composed for D. W. Griffith's The Lily and the Rose (1915), Lloyd Ingraham's The Sable Lorcha (1915), Allan Dwan's Jordan Is a Hard Road (1915), Francis J. Grandon's Cross Currents (1916), and Bernard McConville's The Price of Power (1916).
