= George W. Ryer =

George Washington Ryer (1845 – November 20, 1902) was an American playwright and theatrical manager. A native of New York City, he was a drum major in the 42nd New York Infantry Regiment during the American Civil War while still a teenager. He began his career in the dramatic world as a theatre manager in Brooklyn in 1873. He worked as a manager of road shows and as a booker for musicians and actors in the 1870s and 1880s. By 1885 he was managing the career of actor and playwright Denman Thompson with whom he formed a lengthy partnership as both manager and collaborative dramatist. Together Ryer and Thompson wrote a series of plays that toured and were staged on Broadway: The Old Homestead (1886), The Two Sisters (1888), The Sunshine of Paradise Alley (1896), and Our New Minister (premiered 1899 but written years earlier).

== Early life and career ==
The son of Benjamin and Margaret M. Ryer, George Washington Ryer was born in New York City in 1845. While a teenager he was a drum major in the 42nd New York Infantry Regiment during the American Civil War from April 1861 until he was honorably discharged on July 2, 1864. After the war he worked as an attache of the Brooklyn Post Office until his resignation in 1871.

In 1873 Ryer began his career in the theatre as a press agent for Mrs. F. B. Conway at the Park Theatre in Brooklyn; a venue known at that time as "Mrs F. B. Conway's Brooklyn Theatre". He subsequently worked as Conway's business manager, and briefly served as actress Clara Morris's talent manager. In 1878 he was engaged as cornetist Jules Levy's talent agent; but the relationship soured after a few months when he had to take Levy to court to be paid his agreed upon 5% booking fee on the engagements he had made for the musician.

In the 1879–1880 season Ryer was the manager for the touring show An Arabian Night. In the 1880-1881 and 1881–1882 seasons he managed the show Deacon Crankett with the actor Benjamin Maginley. In the 1882–1883 season he managed the Square Man show and was agent for Margaret Mather's theatre troupe. He managed the touring play A Mountain Pink starring Laura Dainty Pelham, and the Black Mountain Quartette in 1883–1884 season.

== Later life and career with Denman Thompson ==
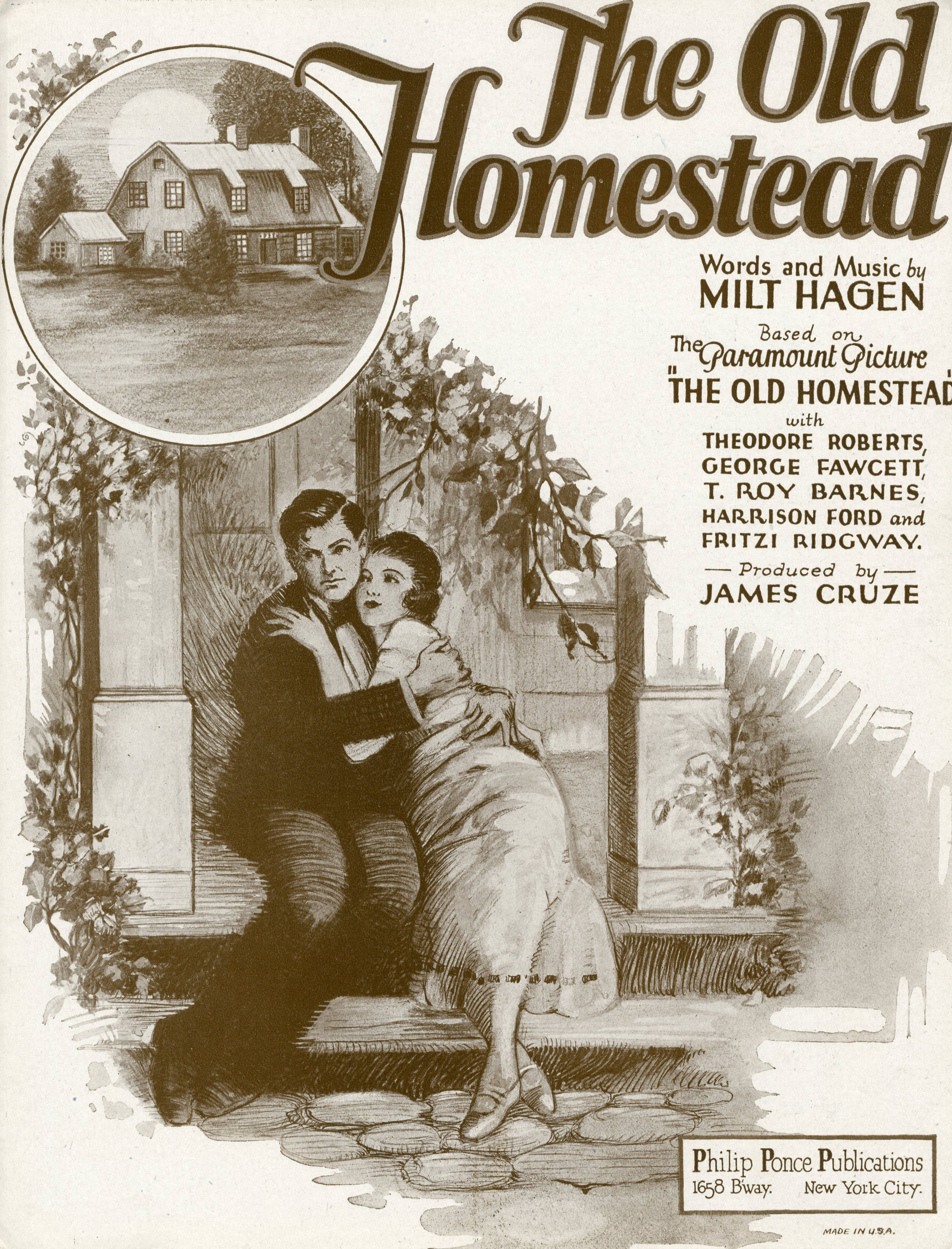
Sheet music cover for song inspired by the 1922 film version of The Old Homestead which was in turn based on Ryer and Thompson's play.

By 1885 Ryer was working as the business manager for the actor and dramatist Denman Thompson; forming a partnership which lasted for 12 years. Together they co-authored the rural drama The Old Homestead which premiered at The Boston Theatre on April 5, 1886 with Thompson starring as Joshua Whitcomb. Thompson continued to perform repeatedly in this role on tour through 1910; including Broadway appearances in 1878 (Lyceum Theatre) and annual returns to the New York stage from 1888 to 1891. The show was subsequently revived multiple times in New York, including in 1913 at the Manhattan Opera House after both Thompson and Ryer had died. The play was also adapted into films in 1915 (directed by James Kirkwood Sr.), 1922 (directed by James Cruze), and 1935 (directed by William Nigh).

Ryer and Thompson also co-wrote other plays together. Their play The Two Sisters was given its premiere at The Boston Theatre on Labor Day 1888, and subsequently toured to Niblo's Garden on Broadway later that year. Ryer and Thompson's The Sunshine of Paradise Alley was staged at the Fourteenth Street Theatre on Broadway in 1896. Their play Our New Minister was given its premiere several years after it was written at the Brooklyn Academy of Music on March 15, 1899. It later was staged on Broadway at the American Theatre in 1903.

Ryer died of Bright's disease at his home in Brooklyn, New York at 75 Poplar Street on November 20, 1902. His death was believed to have been accelerated by injuries he sustained from a fall of 14 feet at the Boston Museum four months prior to his death.
