= Denman Thompson =

American playwright and actor

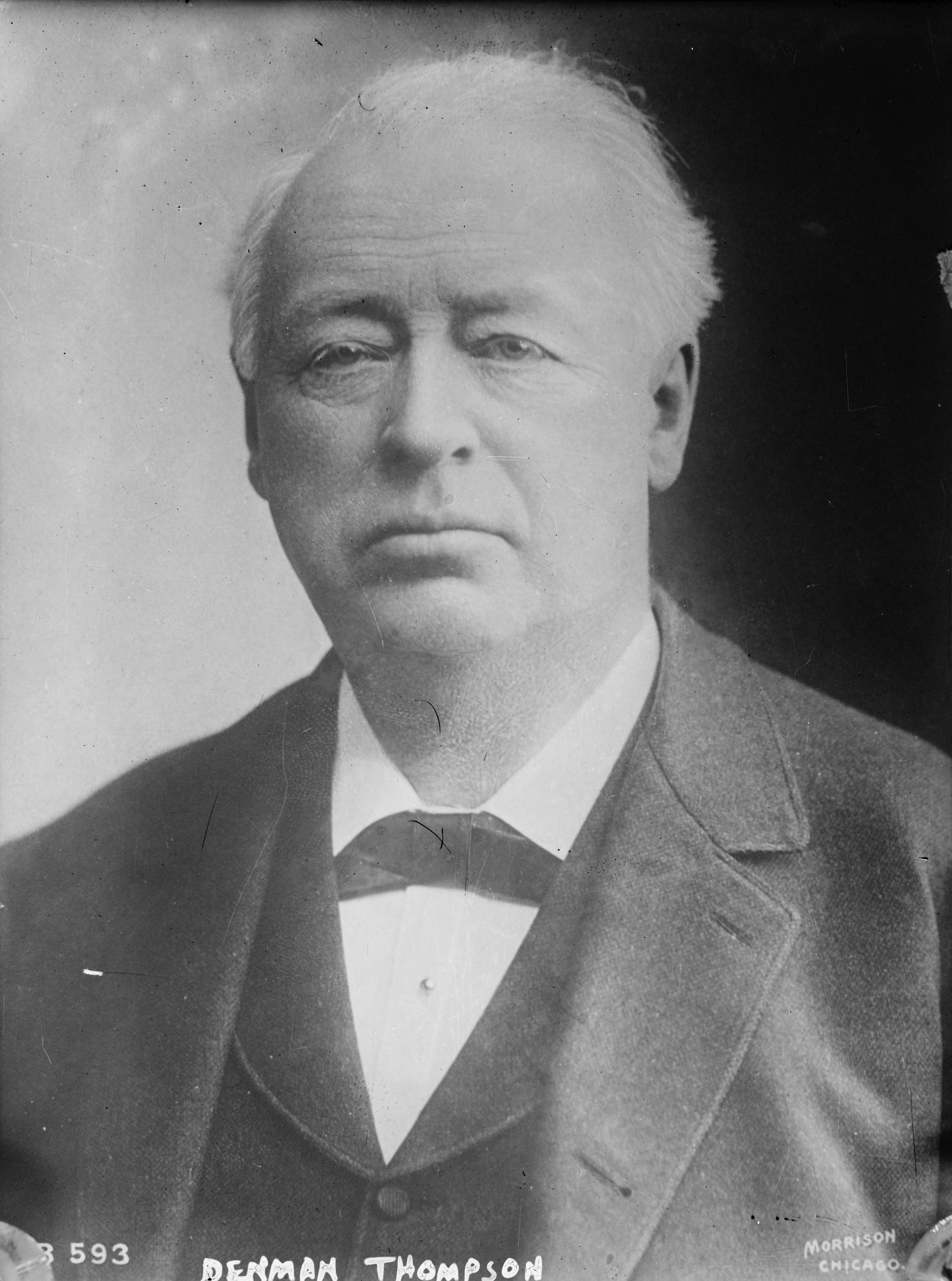
- Born: October 15, 1833; Girard, Pennsylvania, US
- Died: April 14, 1911 (aged 77); West Swanzey, New Hampshire, US
- Occupations: Playwright and actor
- Known for: The Old Homestead
- Spouse: Maria Bolton

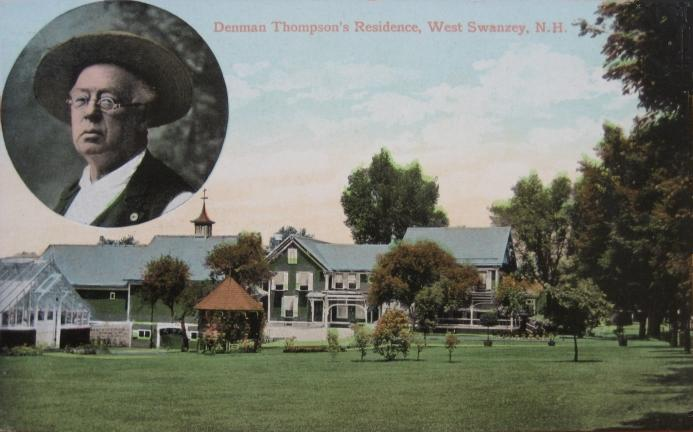
Denman Thompson and his residence in West Swanzey, NH

Henry Denman Thompson (October 15, 1833 – April 14, 1911) was an American playwright and theatre actor. With his manager George W. Ryer, Thompson co-authored several successful plays which toured and were staged on Broadway; including The Old Homestead (1886), The Two Sisters (1888), The Sunshine of Paradise Alley (1896), and Our New Minister (premiered 1899 but written years earlier).

== Biography ==
Rufus Thompson, a carpenter, and his wife Anne Hathaway Baxter moved in 1831 from West Swanzey, New Hampshire to Girard, Pennsylvania, near Erie, where their son Henry Denman Thompson was born. In 1847, they returned to West Swanzey, where he was educated and at nineteen began work as a bookkeeper in Lowell, Massachusetts. While there, he developed an interest in theatre and decided to make it his career. He first went on the professional stage in 1850 at the Howard Athenæum in Boston, where he played a supernumerary in Macbeth. His first speaking role was in 1852 at Lowell, playing Orasman in the military drama, The French Spy. He moved to Toronto in 1854 to train at the Royal Lyceum, and in 1860 married Maria Bolton, with whom he had three children. But Thompson had a disregard for serious study or rehearsals, and a manner unsuited for serious drama. With his large, good-natured eyes and thick red hair brushed straight up, audiences might laugh, ruining the gravitas of any scene. So he abandoned tragedy, and by 1862 was in England, performing at the City of London Theatre as a low comedian.

Thompson returned to Toronto that fall, then moved to his native United States in 1868, where he continued to work in theatre. Years later, he was with a vaudeville troupe when he wrote a short sketch about "Joshua Whitcomb," a New Hampshire "hayseed" who travels to the big city. When Thompson performed the routine for the first time in 1875 at Pittsburgh, it was warmly received, and became quite popular during the next few years. In 1885, he and George W. Ryer rewrote his sketch into a four-act play, entitled The Old Homestead. The new play opened in Boston in April 1886 with Thompson in the lead role, and became a very successful production that made him wealthy, with both a West Swanzey gentleman's farm and nearby lakefront summer cottage.

Thompson toured with the play throughout the United States, debuted with it on Broadway in 1904, and returned as a revival in 1907. In 1915, after his death, it was made into a silent film of the same name by the Famous Players Film Company. Thompson wrote other plays, including some collaborative efforts with George W. Ryer (1843–1902), of which several were made into motion pictures. Their 1886 Broadway play became the basis for the 1926 film Sunshine of Paradise Alley, as was the case with their 1903 Broadway production of Our New Minister, which became the basis for the script for the 1913 Kalem Company film starring Alice Joyce and Tom Moore. In 1914, the Kalem Company also made the highly successful adventure film serial, The Hazards of Helen, based on Thompson's work.

The full arc of Denman Thompson’s career and The Old Homestead is told in Howard Mansfield’s book, Turn & Jump: How Time and Place Fell Apart. (Down East Books/Rowman & Littlefield, 2010). This is the only thorough, contemporary account of Thompson and his play.

“In 1887 The Old Homestead was the hottest ticket in New York,” writes Howard Mansfield in Turn & Jump. “The play ran for more than 25 years touring the country, becoming the "greatest popular success of the American stage." From a time before homes were lit by electricity until the time when airplanes were a country fair attraction, Denman Thompson was playing Uncle Josh Whitcomb to packed theaters. Thompson had added a new character to the folklore. Uncle Josh joined Rip Van Winkle, Davey Crockett, and other outsized 19th Century heroes. Uncle Josh was outsized for his wisdom of staying put. He was the maximum country mouse. ‘Dear Old Joshua is the very embodiment of honesty and rural simplicity,’ says his friend in the play.

“Thompson made millions of dollars. Uncle Josh appeared in the earliest Edison movies, and his stories were recorded on phonograph cylinders. He advertised Ivory soap. There was even a ‘Josh Whitcomb’ brand cigar. (‘As good as the play.’)”

Denman Thompson died when aged 77 at his home in West Swanzey; he was survived by two daughters and a son. He is featured on a New Hampshire historical marker (number 22) near New Hampshire Route 32 in Swanzey.

== See also ==
Thompson's The Old Homestead was the basis for three films:

  - The Old Homestead (1915 film), directed by James Kirkwood Sr.
  - The Old Homestead (1922 film), directed by James Cruze
  - The Old Homestead (1935 film), directed by William Nigh
