= Torrance =

Torrance, also spelled Torrence, is an originally Scottish surname. Torrance may also refer to:

== Places ==
- Torrance, California, United States
- Torrance, East Dunbartonshire, Scotland
- Torrance, South Lanarkshire, Scotland
- Torrance railway station
- Torrance, Ontario, Canada
- Torrance, Pennsylvania, United States
- Torrance Barrens, a conservation area near Torrance, Ontario
- Torrance County, New Mexico, United States

== People ==
=== Given name ===
- Street Symphony (producer), alias of Torrance Esmond, an American record producer and music executive
- Torry Castellano (born 1979), nickname of Torrance Castellano, retired former drummer of the rock band, The Donnas
- Torrance Coombs (born 1983), Canadian-American actor
- Torrance Daniels (born 1981), former American football linebacker and current football coach
- Torrance Gillick (1915–1971), Scottish footballer
- Torrance Marshall (born 1977), American former footballer
- Torrance Small (born 1970), former professional American football wide receiver
- Torrance Watkins (born 1949), American equestrian and Olympic champion
- Torrance Zellner (born 1970), American track and field athlete

=== Surname ===
- Torrance family of Scottish theologians and missionaries
  - Alan Torrance (born 1956), Scottish theologian, son of James Torrance
  - see also under David Torrance (disambiguation)
  - Iain Richard Torrance (born 1949), Scottish theologian, son of Thomas F. Torrance
  - James (J. B.) Torrance (1923–2003), Scottish theologian
  - Thomas Torrance (1871–1959), Scottish missionary to China, patriarch of the family
  - Thomas Forsyth (T. F.) Torrance (1913–2007), Scottish theologian, son of Thomas Torrance
- Alex A. Torrance, Scottish curler
- Alex F. Torrance, Scottish curler and coach
- Bill Torrance (born 1946), Scottish broadcaster
- Bobby Torrance (born 1958), Scottish footballer
- Chris Torrance (born 1941), British poet
- David Torrance (disambiguation), various people with the name
- Ellis Paul Torrance (1915–2003), American psychologist
- George William Torrance (1835–1907), Irish composer
- Isobel Torrance Jr. (later in marriage Hannen) (born 1962), Scottish curler and coach
- Jack Torrance (athlete) (1912–1969), American football player and shot putter
- Jamaal Torrance (born 1983), American sprinter
- Jared Sidney Torrance (1852–1921), American real estate developer
- Jessie Torrance (1874–1949), New Zealand nurse and deaconess
- John Torrance (1786–1870), Scottish merchant and entrepreneur
- Robert Torrance (born 1939), American Professor Emeritus of literature
- Russell Torrance, ABC Classic FM presenter and musician
- Sam Torrance (born 1953), Scottish golfer
- Sandy Torrance (1901–1941), Scottish footballer

== Other uses ==
- Torrance Shipman, fictional character in the film Bring It On, portrayed by Kirsten Dunst
- Jack Torrance, fictional character in Stephen King's The Shining
- Torrance (film), an upcoming American drama film

== See also ==
- Torrence, surname
- Torrent (disambiguation)
