= Thomas Torrance =

Scottish missionary to China

The Reverend Thomas Torrance
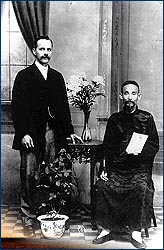
- Thomas Torrance with a native in Sichuan, 1920s.
- Born: 1871; Shotts, Scotland
- Died: 1959 (aged 87–88); Edinburgh, Scotland
- Education: Hulme Cliff College; Livingstone College
- Occupations: Missionary, Presbyterian minister
- Spouse: Annie Elizabeth Sharp
- Children: Thomas F. Torrance; James B. Torrance; David W. Torrance
- Family: Torrance family

Thomas Torrance (1871–1959) was a Scottish Presbyterian minister and Protestant missionary to Sichuan, western China. He was first sent there by the China Inland Mission (CIM), and later by The American Bible Society. He married Annie Elizabeth Sharpe (1883–1980) of the CIM in 1911. He was the father of the 20th century theologian, Thomas F. Torrance.

== Biography ==
Torrance was born in Shotts, Scotland in 1871. He came from a strong evangelical Church of Scotland background. He attended Hulme Cliff College in Derbyshire from 1892 to 1894, and then studied at Livingstone College, London from 1894 to 1895. After finishing his training at Cliff and Livingstone Colleges for missionary service, he was first sent to Chengdu, Sichuan in 1895, by the China Inland Mission (CIM). Torrance was stationed in Western Sichuan, from 1896 to 1910 as a CIM missionary. While he was there, the Boxer Rebellion of 1900 occurred.

Torrance had a number of disagreements with the CIM and eventually left and returned to Scotland in 1909. In 1910, he met up with Dr. John R. Hykes, head of the American Bible Society (ABS) in China, who was attending the Edinburgh 1910 World Missionary Conference. Hykes persuaded him to return to China to take over the West China agency of the ABS in Sichuan, based in Chengdu.

In 1911, Torrance married Annie Elizabeth Sharpe who had also been a member of the CIM, stationed west of Chengdu in Guanxian. From 1912 to 1924, the couple had six children who were all born in China: Mary, Thomas F., Grace, Margaret, James, and David.

Due to unrest caused by Communist troops in the beginning of the Chinese Civil War, the Torrance family left China in 1927 and settled in Scotland for a furlough year. Thomas Torrance returned to China in 1928 to continue his missionary work, without his family, for seven years, and left China for the final time in 1934 due to the Chinese Civil War.

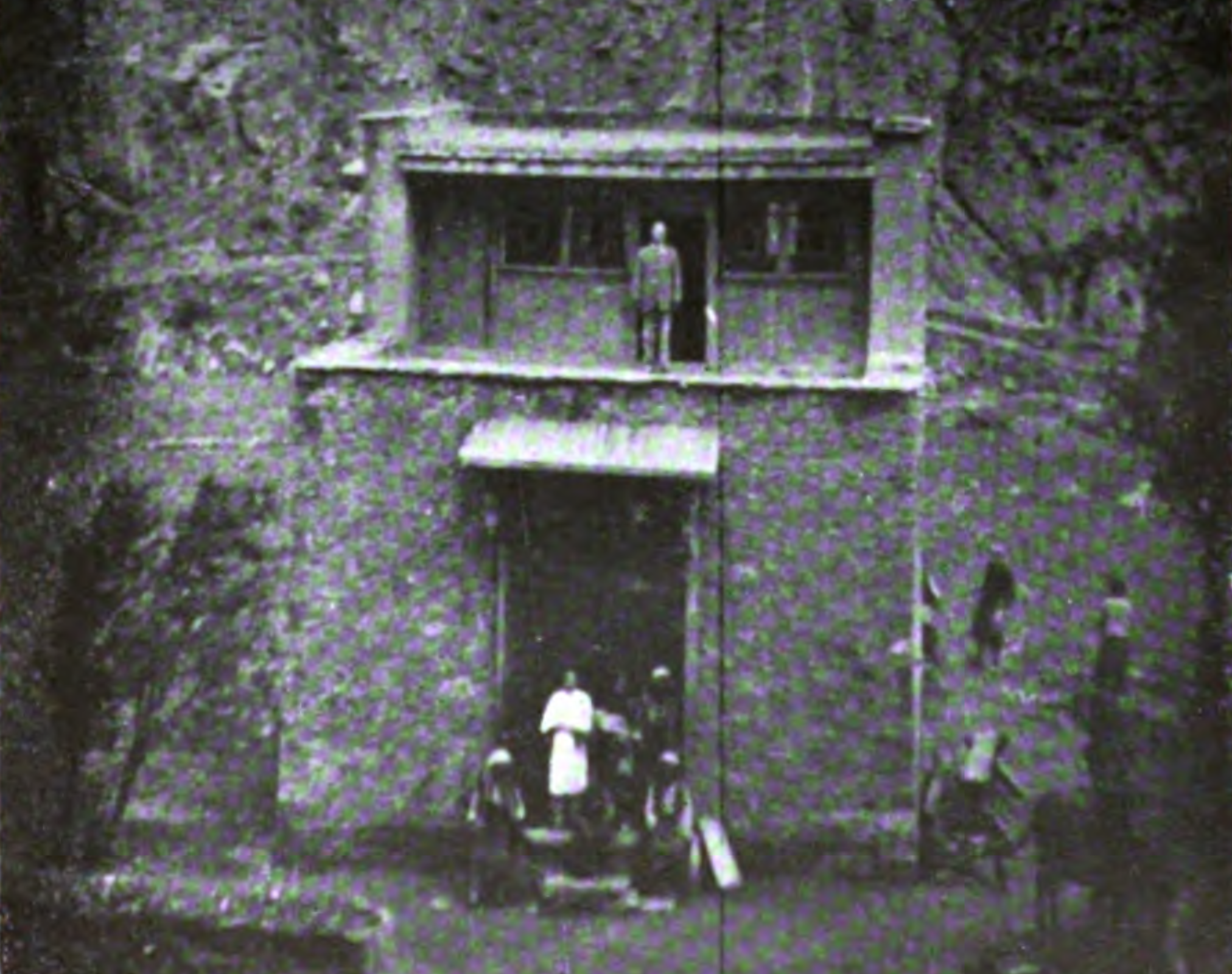
The first Protestant Christian church built in the Qiang country. Torrance is seen at the door of his room which is on the roof of the church.

Torrance is known for being the first Westerner to conduct research among the Qiang people, who he believed belonged to the Lost Tribes of Israel. He was also instrumental in establishing the Archaeological Museum of West China Union University (now Sichuan University). In 2016 an exhibition of Torrance's photographs and other memorabilia was held at Sichuan University in recognition of his historical, archaeological and Qiang research, and his cultural and archaeological contributions to the museum.

He died in Edinburgh in 1959.

== Legacy ==
Thomas and Annie had a legacy of many theologically active members of their descendants. All six of their children were either ministers, or married to Church of Scotland ministers. Other descendants are still involved in ministry, academia, or missionary work.

- Mary M. Wallace (1912-1988), who married Rev. Ronald S. Wallace (1911 - 2006), Church of Scotland minister from 1940 - 1964, then Professor of Theology.
  - Their son in law is George Newlands, an academic theologian.
- Thomas F. Torrance (1913-2007), Church of Scotland Minister and Theologian
  - Iain Torrance (born 1949) - Church of Scotland Minister and Professor of Theology
- Grace B. Walker (1915 - 2011), who married Rev. Robert (Bobby) B. W. Walker (1913-2007), a missionary in Malawi.
- Margaret R. MacKenzie (1917-2004), who married Rev. Kenneth MacKenzie (1920-1971), a missionary in central Africa.
- James B. Torrance (1923-2003)
  - Alan Torrance (born 1956), Church of Scotland minister since 1984, and now professor of Systematic Theology at St Mary's College, St Andrews University
    - Andrew Torrance, senior lecturer within St. Mary's College, St Andrews University.
    - David Torrance - Missionary with the Church Mission Society serving in Tanzania as a theological educator.
- David W. Torrance (born 1924), Church of Scotland minister from 1955 until 1991.
  - David J. Torrance (1962-2023), Church of Scotland minister from 1993 - 2023.

== See also ==
- Protestantism in Sichuan
- The West China Missionary News
- Journal of the West China Border Research Society
