= Baxter Kruger =

American theologian

C. Baxter Kruger
- Born: Prentiss, Mississippi, U.S.
- Education: University of Mississippi; Reformed Theological Seminary; King's College, University of Aberdeen
- Occupations: Theologian, Author, Speaker
- Spouse: Beth Kruger
- Children: 4
- Website: www.perichoresis.org

C. Baxter Kruger is an American theologian and author. He is the founder of Perichoresis Ministries and has written on Trinitarian theology and Christian spirituality.

== Biography ==
Kruger was born in Prentiss, Mississippi. He earned a Bachelor of Arts in political science and psychology from the University of Mississippi and a Master of Divinity from Reformed Theological Seminary in Jackson, Mississippi. He completed a Doctor of Philosophy (PhD) in theology at King's College, Aberdeen, Scotland, with research on the theology of T. F. Torrance, emphasizing Trinitarian theology and its implications for Christian life. James B. Torrance supervised his doctoral studies.

Kruger began his ministry with campus work and later served as an associate pastor. He lectured in theology at the University of Aberdeen. In 1994, Kruger founded Perichoresis Ministries in Jackson, Mississippi. His work examines the theological relationship between God and humanity within Trinitarian doctrine.

== Works ==
Kruger's writings focus on Trinitarian theology and the relational nature of God. His work explores themes such as grace, reconciliation, and humanity's participation in the life of the Trinity. He engages with classical Christian traditions and modern Trinitarian theologians, including T. F. Torrance and James B. Torrance. Kruger critiques certain Western theological frameworks, including penal substitutionary atonement, and has described himself as a “hopeful universalist”. He has also characterized prophets as those who “preach Jesus in you,” emphasizing participation in God's life.

He has contributed forewords to theological works and participated in lecture series and audiobooks. He has delivered lectures at churches, conferences, and theological gatherings in the United States and internationally.

Kruger's publications include both narrative and theological works. The Great Dance: The Christian Vision Revisited uses the metaphor of dance to describe the life of the Trinity and the participation of believers in God's life. The Parable of the Dancing God addresses similar themes of human engagement with God. The Shack Revisited engages with contemporary Christian literature. Jesus and the Undoing of Adam (2003) examines the relationship between humanity and God, emphasizing restoration to fellowship with the Triune God. Patmos (2017) combines narrative storytelling with theological reflection, exploring themes related to union with or separation from God.

== Selected books ==
- Kruger, C. Baxter. The Great Dance: The Christian Vision Revisited. Perichoresis Press, 2011. ISBN 978-0-9645465-4-7.
- ———; The Shack Revisited: There Is More Going On Here Than You Ever Dared to Dream. Hodder & Stoughton, 2012. ISBN 978-1-4447-4583-2
- ———; The Secret: What You Know But Never Knew. Perichoresis Press, 2022. ISBN 979-8-9851553-5-8.
- ———; Patmos: Three Days, Two Men, One Extraordinary Conversation. Perichoresis Press, 2022. ISBN 978-0-9645465-7-8.
- ———; Home. Perichoresis Press, 2022. ISBN 979-8-9851553-3-4.
- ———; Home: The Inconsolable Dream. Perichoresis Press, 2023. ISBN 9798985155389.
- ———; The Parable of the Dancing God. Perichoresis Press, 2023. ISBN 979-8-9851553-1-0.
- ———; The Mediation of Jesus Christ. Perichoresis, Inc., 2024. ISBN 978-1-960761-30-9.
- ———; God Is For Us. Perichoresis Press, 2025. ISBN 978-1-960761-67-5.
