= Iain Paul =

Scottish chemist and theologian

- Born: 15 June 1939; Glasgow, Scotland
- Died: 23 December 2012 (aged 73); Scotland
- Education: University of Strathclyde, University of Bristol, New College, University of Edinburgh, Princeton University
- Occupations: Academic, Chemist, Systematic theologian

Iain Paul (1939–2012) was a Scottish chemist and theologian born in Glasgow, Scotland as the Second World War was stirring. Iain and his sister were raised by their paternal grandparents attending Govan High School (1951–1957).

== Academic life ==
Paul studied chemistry at the University of Strathclyde, Glasgow. Following this he undertook a doctorate in Chemistry which he started at Bangor University and completed at the University of Bristol under the supervision of Professor F. Gordon A. Stone. Following a spell as a post doctoral researcher, at the University of Sheffield under the supervision of Professor Sidney Kettle, he took up a position at Queen Elizabeth College, London as a lecturer in chemistry. His years as a Chemist were highly productive leading to numerous publications in the field of vibrational spectroscopy of isolated molecules, group theory and crystal chemistry. Over time he developed an increasing interest in solid-state physics.

In the 1970s, Iain retrained as a theologian and clergyman at New College, Edinburgh. He spent a year of his early career in the ministry at Princeton University researching a PhD in theology under the supervision of Professor Thomas F. Torrance. As a systematic theologian, his work focused on the relationship between Science and Religion and he published several books in this field.

During this time he married Liz (Russell) and had a son, Findlay Paul and a daughter Liza Paul (now Dr Liza Morton). He retired, due to ill health, from the Church of Scotland (Craigneuk, Wishaw) in 1990.

== Works ==
=== Books ===
- Science and Religion: One World-Changing Perspectives on Reality, edited by Jan Fennema and Iain Paul, Publisher: Dordrecht; Kluwer Academic Publishers, c1990, ISBN 0-7923-0731-3
- Knowledge of God, Calvin, Einstein, and Polanyi, Edinburgh: Scottish Academic Press, 1987, ISBN 0-7073-0537-3
- Science and Theology in Einstein's Perspective, Edinburgh: Scottish Academic Press, 1986, ISBN 0-7073-0449-0
- Science, Theology and Einstein, New York: Oxford University Press, 1982, ISBN 0-19-520378-X (Original Publication @ Belfast: Christian Journals, c1982, ISBN 0-904302-80-6)

=== Selected peer-reviewed publications ===
- Cotton, J D; Dudsworth, Judith; Knox, S A R; Lindley, P F; Paul, I; Stone, F G A; Woodward, P. "Tin-iron carbonyl clusters and sequences". Chem. Commun. 1966: 253. doi:10.1039/c19660000253.
- Flitcroft, N; Harbourne, D A; Paul, I; Tucker, P M; Stone, F G A. "Chemistry of the metal carbonyls Part XXXV Bis(dicarbonyl-π cyclopentadienyliron)bis(iodo)germane and related compounds". Journal of the Chemical Society. 1966: 1130. doi:10.1039/j19660001130.
- Cotton, J D; Knox, S A R; Paul, I; Stone, F G A. "Chemistry of the metal carbonyls Part XXXIX Organotin(carbonyl)-iron complexes". Journal of the Chemical Society A. 1967: 264.
- Kettle, S.F.A.; Paul, I. (1968). "The b1 carbonyl stretching mode in the infrared spectra of C4v M(CO)5X complexes". Inorg. Chim. Acta. 2: 15–16. doi:10.1016/s0020-1693(00)86985-6.
- Dalton, J; Paul, I; Smith, J G; Stone, F G A. "Spectroscopic studies on organometallic compounds Part XI Infrared spectra of pentacarbonyl complexes of metals of the chromium and manganese sub-groups in the carbonyl stretching region". Journal of the Chemical Society A. 1968: 1195.
- Dalton, J; Paul, I; Smith, J G; Stone, F G A. "Spectroscopic studies on organometallic compounds Part XII Infrared spectra of tetracarbonylcobalt complexes in the carbonyl stretching region". Journal of the Chemical Society A. 1968: 1199.
- Abel, E W; Dalton, J; Paul, I; Smith, J G; Stone, F G A. "Spectroscopic studies on organometallic compounds Part XIII Infrared spectra of octacarbonylmanganese complexes and related compounds in the carbonyl stretching region". Journal of the Chemical Society A. 1968: 1203.
- Dalton, J; Paul, I; Smith, J G; Stone, F G A. "Spectroscopic studies on organometallic compounds Part XIV Infrared spectra of tricarbonylmolybdenum complexes in the carbonyl stretching region". Journal of the Chemical Society A. 1968: 1208.
- Dalton, J; Paul, I; Stone, F G A. "Spectroscopic studies on organometallic compounds Part XV Infrared spectra of pentacarbonylmetal fluorocarbon complexes in the carbonyl stretching region". Journal of the Chemical Society A. 1968: 1212.
- Dalton, J; Paul, I; Stone, F G A. "Spectroscopic studies on organometallic compounds Part XVI Infrared spectra of organotin(carbonyl)iron complexes in the carbonyl stretching region". Journal of the Chemical Society A. 1968: 1215.
- Dalton, J; Paul, I; Stone, F G A. "Spectroscopic studies on organometallic compounds Part XVII Infrared spectra of dicarbonyl-(π-pentadienyl)iron complexes in the carbonyl stretching region". Journal of the Chemical Society A. 1969: 2744.
- Buttery, H.J.; Keeling, G.; Kettle, S.F.A.; Paul, I.; Stamper, P. "Solid state studies. I. Raman and infraredactive carbonyl stretching vibrations of πbenzenetricarbonylchromium". Journal of the Chemical Society A. 1969: 2077.
- Buttery, H.J.; Keeling, G.; Kettle, S.F.A.; Paul, I.; Stamper, P. "Solidstate studies. II. Raman and infraredactive carbonyl stretching vibrations of four methylbenzenetricarbonylchromium complexes". Journal of the Chemical Society A. 1969: 2224.
- Buttery, H.J.; Keeling, G.; Kettle, S.F.A.; Paul, I.; Stamper, P. (1969). "Correlation between the crystal structure and carbonylbond stretching vibrations of methyl benzene transition metal tricarbonyls". Discuss. Faraday Soc. 47: 48. doi:10.1039/df9694700048.
- Buttery, H.J.; Keeling, G.; Kettle, S.F.A.; Paul, I.; Stamper, P. "Solidstate studies. III. Raman and infraredactive carbonyl stretching vibrations of 1,3 and 1,4dimethylbenzene- tricarbonylchromium". Journal of the Chemical Society A. 1970: 471.
- Kettle, S.F.A.; Paul, I.; Stamper, P. "Relative intensities in the Raman spectra of metal carbonyls in the 2000 cm-1 region". J. Chem. Soc. D. 1970: 1724.
- Kettle, S.F.A.; Paul, I.; Stamper, P. "Relative intensities in the Raman spectra of metal carbonyl derivatives in the 2000 cm-1 region". J. Chem. Soc. D. 1971: 235.
- Keeling, G.; Kettle, S.F.A.; Paul, I. "Factors influencing the absolute intensity of the carbonyl stretching modes of a series of transitionmetal pentacarbonylhalide derivatives". Journal of the Chemical Society A. 1971: 3143.
- Buttery, H.J.; Keeling, G.; Kettle, S.F.A.; Paul, I.; Stamper, P. "Solidstate studies. IV. Vibrational spectra of cisdiethylenetriaminetricarbonylchromium, molybdenum, and tungsten, of 1,2,3, 1,2,4,5, and 1,3,5methylbenzene- tricarbonylchromium, and cyclopentadienyltricarbonylmanganese". Journal of the Chemical Society A. 1971: 3148.
- Kettle, S.F.A.; Paul, I. (1972). "The infrared intensities of metal carbonyl stretching vibrations". Advan. Organometal. Chem. 10: 199.
- Buttery, H.J.; Keeling, G.; Kettle, S.F.A.; Paul, I.; Stamper, P. "Solid state studies. V. Raman and infraredactive carbonyl stretching vibrations of three triphenyltin complexes". J. Chem. Soc., Dalton Trans. 1972: 2487.
- Kettle, S.F.A.; Paul, I.; Stamper, P. "A bondpolarizability approach to the intensity of Raman spectral bands of metal carbonyls in the 2000 cm1 region". J. Chem. Soc., Dalton Trans. 1972: 2413.
- Kettle, S.F.A.; Paul, I.; Stamper, P. (1973). "The relative intensities of Raman spectral bands". Inorg. Chim. Acta. 7: 11–16. doi:10.1016/s0020-1693(00)94776-5.
- Buttery, H.J.; Kettle, S.F.A.; Paul, I. "Solidstate studies. VI. Singlecrystal Raman study of the vibrations of the tricarbonylchromium unit in benzenetricarbonylchromium and tricarbonyl(1,3dimethylbenzene)chromium". J. Chem. Soc., Dalton Trans. 1974: 2293.
- Buttery, H.J.; Kettle, S.F.A. (1975). "Singlecrystal Raman study of the vibration of the tricarbonylchromium unit in hexa and pentamethylbenzenetricarbonylchromium". J. Chem. Soc., Dalton Trans. 11: 969.

=== Reviews ===
- Paul, I (1991). "Grounds for Reasonable Belief. By Russell Stannard. Edinburgh, Scottish Academic Press, 1989. Pp. xiv + 361. $12.50". Scottish Journal of Theology. 44 (2): 240–242. doi:10.1017/S0036930600039156.
- Paul, I (1990). "Logic and Affirmation: Perspectives in Mathematics and Theology. By John Puddefoot. Edinburgh, Scottish Academic Press, 1987. Pp. xxii + 212. £12.50". Scottish Journal of Theology. 43 (4): 514–516. doi:10.1017/S003693060003951X.
- Paul, I (1990). "Abusing Science. The Case Against Creationism. By Philip Kitcher. Milton Keynes, Open University Press, 1982. Pp. vii + 213. No price". Scottish Journal of Theology. 38 (3): 433–435. doi:10.1017/S0036930600041107.
- Paul, I (1985). "Angels, Apes, and Men. By Stanley L. Jaki. La Salle, Illinois, Sherwood Sugden & Company and Edinburgh, The Handsel Press, 1983. Pp. 124. £4·75". Scottish Journal of Theology. 38 (2): 255–256. doi:10.1017/S0036930600041429.
- Paul, I (1985). "Transformation and Convergence in the Frame of Knowledge. By Thomas F. Torrance. Belfast, Christian Journals Ltd., 1984. Pp. xiv + 353. £19.50". Scottish Journal of Theology. 38 (3): 429–431. doi:10.1017/S0036930600041089.
