= Rhys Williams (actor) =

Welsh character actor (1897–1969)

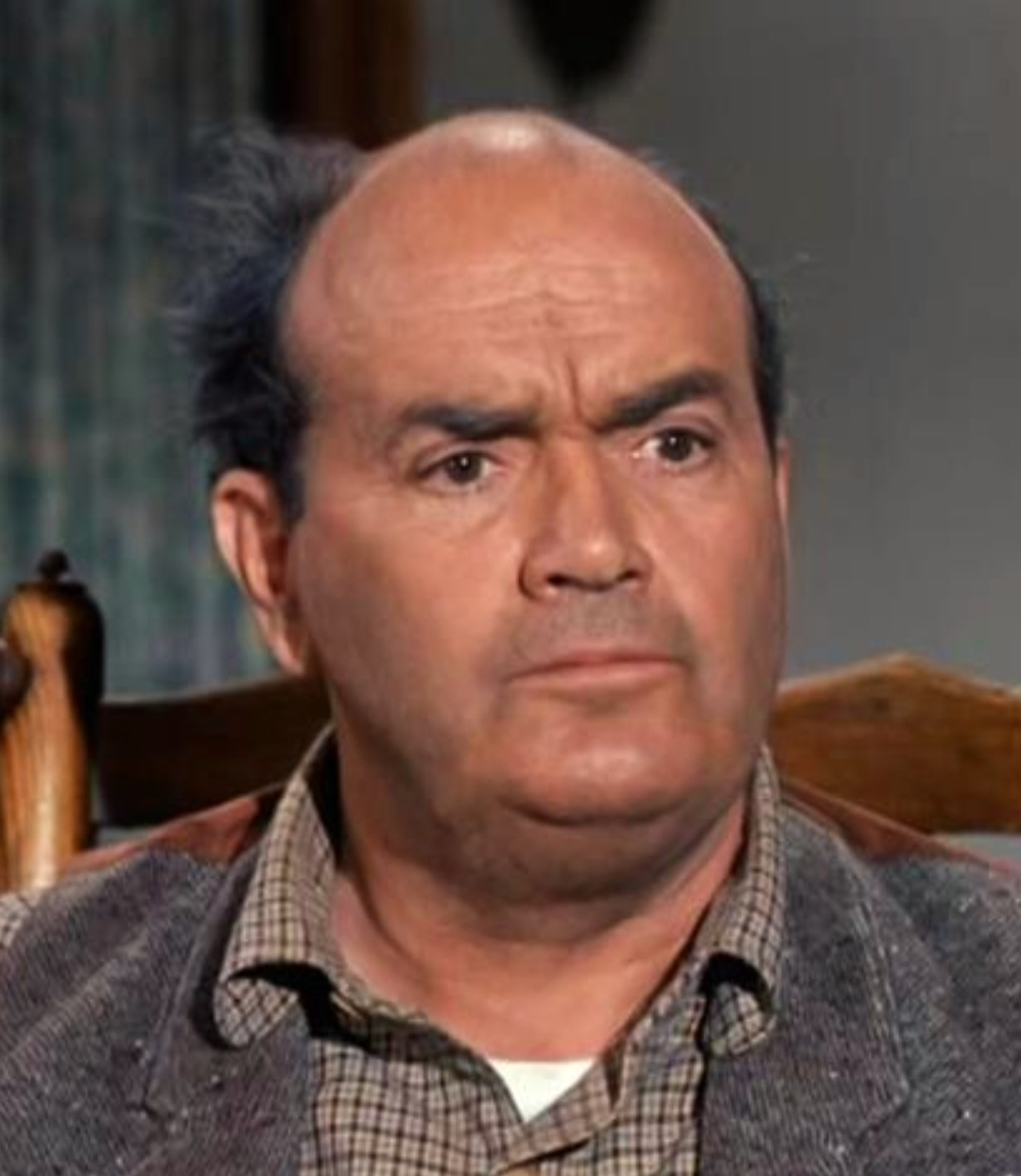
- Williams in Bonanza (1960)
- Born: 31 December 1897; Clydach, Wales
- Died: 28 May 1969 (aged 71); Santa Monica, California, U.S.
- Resting place: Forest Lawn Memorial Park, Hollywood Hills, Los Angeles, California
- Occupation: Actor
- Years active: 1941–1969
- Spouse: Elsie Dvorak
- Children: 2

Rhys Williams (31 December 1897 – 28 May 1969) was a Welsh character actor. He appeared in 78 films over a span of 30 years and later appeared on several American television series.

== Career ==
He made his 1941 film debut in the role of Dai Bando in How Green Was My Valley, a drama about a working-class Welsh family that won the Academy Award for Best Picture. Williams was the only Welsh actor in the cast. He is believed to have been the original narrator of the film, and was originally hired by director John Ford as a dialogue coach.

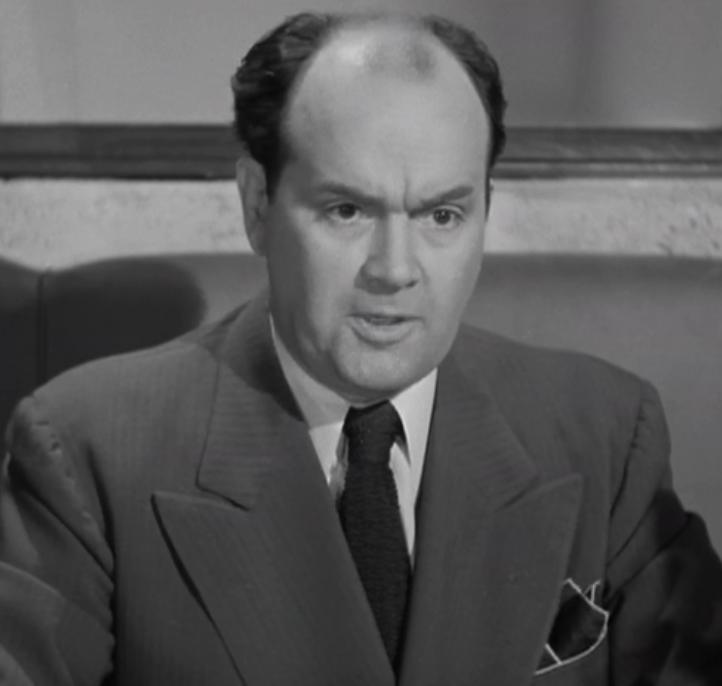
Williams in Blood on the Sun (1945)

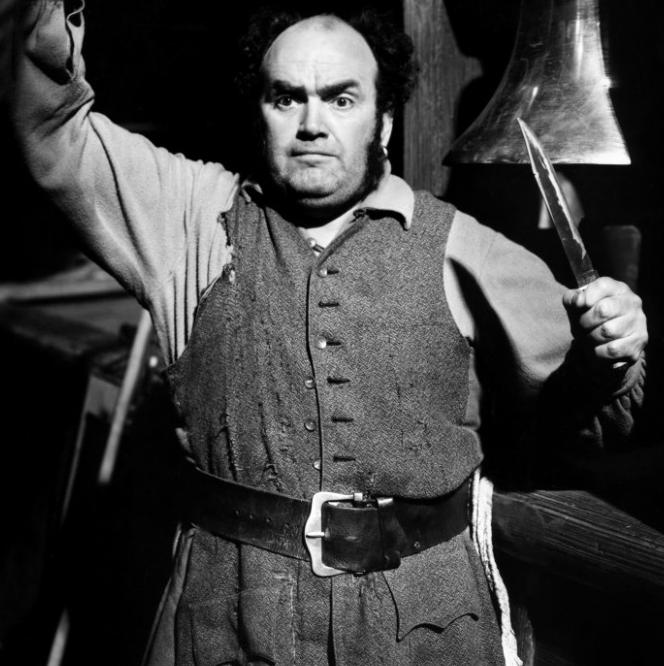
Williams in Mutiny (1952)

During television's early years in America, Williams was in scores of series episodes, including the Adventures of Superman as a sadistic character in the 1952 episode "The Evil Three". Williams played art collector Rufus Varner in the 1958 Perry Mason episode, "The Case of the Purple Woman", and appeared on the religion anthology series, Crossroads. His other television work was on such programmes as The Rifleman, The DuPont Show with June Allyson, Peter Gunn, Riverboat and The Lloyd Bridges Show. His later appearances were on Temple Houston, 77 Sunset Strip, The Wild Wild West, 12 O'Clock High, Bonanza, The F.B.I., Mission: Impossible, Mannix, The Donna Reed Show, Here Come the Brides and The Andy Griffith Show.

== Death ==
Williams died at the age of 71 in Santa Monica, California, on 28 May 1969. His remains are interred at Forest Lawn Memorial Park in Los Angeles.

== Filmography ==
=== Broadway theatre ===
Title	Dates	Role	Theatre	Notes	Ref(s)
Alice in Wonderland	24 December 1930 – 4 January 1931	Performer	Belmont Theatre		
King Richard II	5 February 1937 – Jun 1937	Second Herald; Captain of a band of Welshmen; Groom of the King's Stable	St. James Theatre		
King Richard II	15 September 1937 – 16 October 1937	Captain of a band of Welshmen; Groom of the King's Stable	St. James Theatre		
Hamlet	12 October 1938 – Jan 1939	Player King; Ambassador	St. James Theatre	Assistant stage manager	
Henry IV, Part 1	30 January 1939 – 1 April 1939	First Carrier; Owen Glendower	St. James Theatre	Assistant stage manager	
Hamlet	4 December 1939 – 6 January 1940	Player King; First Gravedigger	44th Street Theatre		
King Richard II	1 April 1940 – 27 April 1940	Captain of a band of Welshmen; Lord Marshal; Gardener	St. James Theatre		
The Corn Is Green	Nov 1940 – Sept 1941	John Goronwy Jones	Nederlander Theatre	Assistant to the Director	
The Corn Is Green	Sept 1941 – Jan 1942	John Goronwy Jones	Royale Theatre	Assistant to the Director	
The Morning Star	14 September 1942 – 3 October 1942	Brimbo Watkyn	Morosco Theatre		
Lifeline	30 November 1942 – 5 December 1942	Captain J. McGrath, Master	Belasco Theatre		
Harriet	3 March 1943 – 1 April 1944	Calvin Stowe	Henry Miller's Theatre		
Chicken Every Sunday	5 April 1944 – 20 May 1944	Jim Blachman	Henry Miller's Theatre		
Chicken Every Sunday	20 May 1944 – 6 January 1945	Jim Blachman	Plymouth Theatre		
Mr. Peebles and Mr. Hooker	10 October 1946 – 12 October 1946	Mr. Hooker	Music Box Theatre		
The Biggest Thief in Town	30 March 1949 – 9 April 1949	Sam Wilkins	Mansfield Theatre		

=== Film ===
Title	Year	Role	Notes	Ref(s)
How Green Was My Valley	1941	Dai Bando	20th Century Fox; Also served as technical advisor Preserved at the UCLA Film & Television Archive	
Cairo	1942	Strange Man	MGM	
Gentleman Jim	1942	Harry Watson	Warner Bros.	
Random Harvest	1942	Sam	MGM	
Remember Pearl Harbor	1942	Andy L Anderson	Republic Pictures	
Underground Agent	1942	Henry Miller	Columbia Pictures	
Mrs. Miniver	1942	Horace	MGM	
This Above All	1942	Sergeant (uncredited)	20th Century Fox	
Eagle Squadron	1942	Sergeant Johns	Universal Pictures	
No Time for Love	1943	Clancy (uncredited)	Paramount Pictures	
Blood on the Sun	1945	Joseph Cassell	Cagney Productions, Inc.	
You Came Along	1945	Colonel Stubbs	Paramount Pictures	
The Bells of St. Mary's	1945	Dr. McKay	RKO; Preserved at the UCLA Film & Television Archive	
Voice of the Whistler	1945	Ernie Sparrow	Columbia Pictures	
The Corn Is Green	1945	Mr. Jones	Warner Bros.	
The Spiral Staircase	1946	Mr. Oates	RKO	
The Strange Woman	1946	Deacon Adams	Mars Film Corp.	
So Goes My Love	1946	Magel	Skirball-Manning Productions	
Cross My Heart	1946	Prosecutor	Paramount Pictures	
The Trouble with Women	1947	Judge	Paramount Pictures	
The Imperfect Lady	1947	Inspector Carston	Paramount Pictures	
Moss Rose	1947	Deputy Inspector Evans	20th Century Fox	
The Farmer's Daughter	1947	Adolph Petree	RKO	
Easy Come, Easy Go	1947	Priest	Paramount Pictures	
If Winter Comes	1947	Mr. Bright	MGM	
Tenth Avenue Angel	1948	Blind Mac	MGM	
The Black Arrow	1948	Bennet Hatch	Columbia Pictures	
Hills of Home	1948	Mr. Milton	MGM	
Tokyo Joe	1949	Colonel Dahlgren	Santana Pictures, Inc.	
Fighting Man of the Plains	1948	Chandler Leach	20th Century Fox	
The Inspector General	1949	Inspector General	Warner Bros.	
Bad Boy	1949	Arnold Strawn	Allied Artists Pictures	
The Crooked Way	1949	Lieutenant Joe Williams	United Artists	
California Passage	1950	John Norris	Republic Pictures	
Kiss Tomorrow Goodbye	1950	Vic Mason	William Cagney Productions; Preserved at the UCLA Film & Television Archive	
Devil's Doorway	1950	Scotty MacDougall	MGM	
Tyrant of the Sea	1950	Captain William Blake	Columbia Pictures	
The Showdown	1950	Chokecherry	Republic Pictures	
One Too Many	1950	Michael H. 'Sully' Sullivan	Filmed 1950, released 1951; Hallmark Productions	
Lightning Strikes Twice	1951	Father Paul	Warner Bros.	
The Law and the Lady	1951	Inspector McGraw	MGM	
The Son of Dr. Jekyll	1951	Michaels, the Butler	Columbia Pictures	
The Light Touch	1951	Mr. MacWade	MGM	
The Sword of Monte Cristo	1951	Mayor of Varonne	20th Century Fox	
Million Dollar Pursuit	1951	Waxman 'Waxey' Wilk	Republic Pictures	
Never Trust a Gambler	1951	Police Sergeant Quentin McCloy	Columbia Pictures	
Les Misérables	1952	Brevet	20th Century Fox	
The World in His Arms	1952	Eben Cleggett	Universal Pictures	
Carbine Williams	1952	Redwick Karson	MGM	
Mutiny	1952	Redlegs	King Brothers Productions	
Okinawa	1952	Robby Roberg	Columbia Pictures	
Plymouth Adventure	1952	Mr. Weston (uncredited)	MGM	
Meet Me at the Fair	1953	Pete McCoy	Universal Pictures	
Julius Caesar	1953	Lucilius	MGM	
Scandal at Scourie	1953	Bill Swazey	MGM	
Man in the Attic	1953	William Harley	20th Century Fox	
Bad for Each Other	1953	Dr. Leslie M. Scobee	Columbia Pictures	
Johnny Guitar	1954	Mr. Andrews	Republic Pictures	
The Black Shield of Falworth	1954	Diccon Bowman	Universal Pictures	
There's No Business Like Show Business	1954	Father Dineen	20th Century Fox	
The King's Thief	1955	Turnkey	MGM	
Many Rivers to Cross	1955	Lige Blake	MGM	
The Scarlet Coat	1955	Peter Andre	MGM	
The Kentuckian	1955	Constable	United Artists	
Battle Cry	1955	Enoch Rogers	Warner Bros.	
How to Be Very, Very Popular	1955	Cedric Flagg	20th Century Fox	
Mohawk	1956	Clem Jones	20th Century Fox	
The Desperados Are in Town	1956	Jud Collins	20th Century Fox	
The Boss	1956	Stanley Millard	United Artists	
The Fastest Gun Alive	1956	Brian Tibbs	MGM	
Nightmare	1956	Torrence	United Artists	
The Restless Breed	1957	Reverend Simmons	20th Century Fox	
Raintree County	1957	Ezra Gray	MGM	
Merry Andrew	1958	Constable	MGM	
Midnight Lace	1960	Victor Elliot	Universal Pictures	
The Sons of Katie Elder	1965	Charlie Striker	Paramount Pictures	
Our Man Flint	1966	Dr. Krupov	20th Century Fox	
Skullduggery	1970	Judge Draper	Released posthumously Universal Pictures	

=== Television ===
Program	Episode	Air date	Notes	Ref(s)
Four Star Playhouse	"Backstage"	6 November 1952	Stage manager	
Studio One	"The Incredible Mr. Glencannon"	10 November 1952	Guest Star	
Four Star Playhouse	"Man on the Train"	15 January 1953	Raikes	
Adventures of Superman	The Evil Three	23 January 1953	Macy Taylor	
Your Jeweler's Showcase	"Monkey's Paw"	7 April 1953		
Four Star Playhouse	"Night Ride"	7 May 1953	Bum	
General Electric Theater	"Test of Love"	16 August 1953	Mr. Smith	
Four Star Playhouse	"The Wallet"	21 October 1954	Sidney	
The Danny Thomas Show	"Sonnets from the Lebanese"	8 November 1955		
The Best of the Post	"Marriage That Couldn't Succeed"	c.1956		
Crossroads	"Our First Christmas Tree"	1956		
The Loretta Young Show	"The Question"	2 September 1956	Professor Green	
General Electric Theater	"Mischief at Bandyleg"	3 November 1957	Matthew Magee	
Code 3	"Ashes Will Whisper"	1957		
Alfred Hitchcock Presents	Season 2 Episode 32: "The Hands of Mr Ottermole"	1957	Mr. Summers	
Wagon Train	The Liam Fitzmorgan Story	28 October 1958	James Grady	
The Donna Reed Show	"The Busy Body"	17 December 1958	Uncle Fred	
Perry Mason	"The Case of the Purple Woman"	6 December 1958	Rufus Varner	
The Rifleman	"Blood Brothers"	26 May 1959		
The Rifleman	"Bloodlines"	10 October 1959		
The Rifleman	"Letter of the Law"	1 December 1959		
Riverboat	"Strange Request"	13 December 1959	Josiah Cragg	
The Rifleman	"A Case of Identity"	19 January 1960		
Bonanza	"Bitter Water"	9 April 1960	Andy McKaren	
The Rifleman	"Sins of the Father"	19 April 1960		
The Rifleman	"The Prodigal"	26 April 1960		
Dr. Kate. Spitfire	TV pilot	1960		
Peter Gunn	"The Passenger"	3 October 1960		
The DuPont Show with June Allyson	"Play Acting"	27 October 1960	Russell	
The Real McCoys	"The Law and Mr. McCoy"	1 February 1962	Judge Reuter	
The Bob Cummings Show	"Fasten Your Money Belt"	1 March 1962		
The Lloyd Bridges Show	"The Ramp"	8 May 1963		
Temple Houston	"Billy Hart"	28 November 1963	Judge Curry	
77 Sunset Strip	"Not Such a Simple Knot"	17 January 1964	Uncle Molnar	
12 O'Clock High	"Interlude"	27 November 1964	Adam MacRae	
The Wild Wild West	"The Night of the Druid's Blood"	25 March 1966	Dr. Tristam	
The F. B. I.	"The Assassin"	9 October 1966	Dean Vincent Sutherland	
Armstrong Circle Theatre	"Brigadoon"	15 October 1966		
Mission Impossible	"The Train"	8 March 1967	Prime Minister Ferenc Larya	
The Andy Griffith Show	" Aunt Bee, the Juror"	23 October 1967	Judge Cranston	
Here Come the Brides	"A Kiss For Just So"	29 January 1969	Bishop Newkirk	
Mannix	"Last Rites for Miss Emma"	8 March 1969	Doctor	
