= Ian McFarland =

Ian McFarland may refer to:

- Ian A. McFarland, theologian
- Ian McFarland (musician), bassist and director
