= Ronald Wallace (theologian) =

Ronald Wallace (1911–2006) was a theologian and Professor of Biblical Theology at Columbia Theological Seminary. He was also a member of the Torrance family of theologians.

== Career overview ==
- Brora, Minister without Charge
- 1940 Minister, Pollock Church, Glasgow
- Church of Scotland's Huts and Canteens
- 1951 Minister, St Kentigern's Church, Lanark
- 1958 Minister, Lothian Road Church, Edinburgh
- 1964 Professor of Biblical Theology at Columbia Theological Seminary, Decatur, Georgia
- 1977 Near East School of Theology, Beirut

== Education ==
His secondary education took place at the Royal High School. At sixteen he matriculated at the University of Edinburgh and studied a degree in civil engineering. He proceeded to the Faculty of Arts. Studies in Divinity followed; he was a pupil of H.R. Mackintosh and William Manson. While Minister of St Kentigern's in Lanark he gained his PhD on Calvin's Doctrine of the Word and Sacraments.

== Family and theological connections ==
In July 1937 he married Mary Moulin Torrance, the sister of Thomas F. Torrance. They had a son, David, and two daughters: Elizabeth and Heather. Wallace's nephews include theologians Iain Torrance and Alan Torrance; moreover, his son-in-law George Newlands is also an academic theologian.

== Sources ==
- Torrance, I.R. (1 March 2006). "Obituary: Professor Ronald Wallace". The Scotsman.
