= Ronald Wallace =

Ronald or Ron Wallace may refer to:

- Ronald Wallace (theologian) (1911–2006), theologian and professor of biblical theology
- Ronald Wallace (poet), American poet and professor of poetry and English
- Ronald Wallace (politician) (1916–2008), mayor of Halifax, Canada, 1980–1991
- Ron Wallace (singer), American country music singer
