= Law of the West (1949 film) =

1949 film

- Theatrical release poster
- Directed by: Ray Taylor
- Screenplay by: J. Benton Cheney
- Produced by: Barney Sarecky
- Starring: Johnny Mack Brown; Max Terhune; Bill Kennedy; Jack Ingram; Riley Hill; Eddie Parker
- Cinematography: Harry Neumann
- Edited by: John C. Fuller
- Production company: Monogram Pictures
- Distributed by: Monogram Pictures
- Release date: February 20, 1949
- Running time: 54 minutes
- Country: United States
- Language: English

Law of the West is a 1949 American Western film directed by Ray Taylor and written by J. Benton Cheney. The film stars Johnny Mack Brown, Max Terhune, Bill Kennedy, Jack Ingram, Riley Hill and Eddie Parker. The film was released on February 20, 1949, by Monogram Pictures.

== Cast ==
- Johnny Mack Brown as Johnny Mack
- Max Terhune as Alibi Jenkins
- Bill Kennedy as Dan Nixon
- Jack Ingram as Henry Burke
- Riley Hill as Charley Lane
- Eddie Parker as Mike
- Marshall Reed as Drago
- Kenne Duncan as Frank Stevens
- Gerry Pattison as Tennessee Lane
- James Harrison as Sheriff Al Simpson
- Bud Osborne as Brooks
- Steve Clark as Barry Lane
- Bob Woodward as Spence
