= Anti-foundationalism =

Epistemology without sure premises

Anti-foundationalism (also called nonfoundationalism) is any philosophy which rejects a foundationalist approach. An anti-foundationalist is one who does not believe that there is some fundamental belief or principle which is the basic ground or foundation of inquiry and knowledge.

Anti-foundationalism can be metaphysical (positing a ground of being or metaphysical foundation), ethical (positing some value or virtue as fundamental), epistemological (i.e. the foundationalist theory of justification) or apply to some other field with foundationalist theories.

== Anti-essentialism ==
Anti-foundationalists use logical or historical or genealogical attacks on foundational concepts (see especially Nietzsche and Foucault), often coupled with alternative methods for justifying and forwarding intellectual inquiry, such as the pragmatic subordination of knowledge to practical action. Foucault dismissed the search for a return to origins as Platonic essentialism, preferring to stress the contingent nature of human practices.

Anti-foundationalists oppose metaphysical methods. Moral and ethical anti-foundationalists are often criticized for moral relativism, but anti-foundationalists often dispute this charge, offering alternative methods of moral thought that they claim do not require foundations. Thus while Charles Taylor accused Foucault of having "no order of human life, or way we are, or human nature, that one can appeal to in order to judge or evaluate between ways of life", Foucault nevertheless insists on the need for continuing ethical enquiry without any universal system to appeal to.

Niklas Luhmann used cybernetics to challenge the role of foundational unities and canonical certainties.

== Totalisation and legitimation ==
Anti-foundationalists oppose totalising visions of social, scientific or historical reality, considering them to lack legitimation, and preferring local narratives instead. No social totality but a multitude of local and concrete practices; "not a history but at best histories". In such neopragmatism, there is no overall truth, merely an ongoing process of better and more fruitful methods of edification. Even our most taken-for-granted categories for social analysis—of gender, sex, race, and class—are considered by anti-essentialists like Marjorie Garber as social constructs.

== Hope and fear ==
Stanley Fish distinguishes between what he calls "antifoundationalist theory hope" and "antifoundationalist theory fear"—finding them however both equally illusory.

Fear of the corrosive effects of antifoundationalism was widespread in the late twentieth century, anticipating such things as a cultural meltdown and moral anarchy, or (at the least) a loss of the necessary critical distance to allow for leverage against the status quo. For Fish, however, the threat of a loss of objective standards of rational enquiry with the disappearance of any founding principle was a false fear: far from opening the way to an unbridled subjectivity, antifoundationalism leaves the individual firmly entrenched within the conventional context and standards of enquiry/dispute of the discipline/profession/habitus within which s/he is irrevocably placed.

By the same token, however, the antifoundationalist hope of escaping local situations through awareness of the contingency of all such situations—through recognition of the conventional/rhetorical nature of all claims to master principles—that hope is to Fish equally foredoomed by the very nature of the situational consciousness, the all-embracing social and intellectual context, in which every individual is separately enclosed.

Fish has also noted how, in contradistinction to hopes of an emancipatory outcome from antifoundationalism, anti-essentialist theories arguing for the absence of a transcontextual point of reference have been put to conservative and neo-conservative, as well as progressive, ends. Thus, for example, John Searle has offered an account of the construction of social reality fully compatible with the acceptance stance of "the man who is at home in his society, the man who is chez lui in the social institutions of the society...as comfortable as the fish in the sea".

== Criticism ==
Anti-foundationalists have been criticised for attacking all general claims except their own; for offering a localizing rhetoric contradicted in practice by their own globalizing style.

Edward Said condemned radical anti-foundationalism for excessive cultural relativism and overdependence on the linguistic turn at the expense of human realities.

== See also ==
- Coherentism
- Contextualism
- Deconstruction
- Foundationalism
- Justified true belief
- Neurath's boat
- Nominalism
- Postfoundationalism
- Postmodern philosophy
- Pragmatism
- Relativism
- Reliabilism
- Skepticism
- Verificationism
