= David Torrence =

David Torrence may refer to:

- David Torrence (actor) (1864–1951), Scottish-American film character actor
- David Torrence (athlete) (1985–2017), Peruvian-American Olympic runner

== See also ==
- David Torrance (disambiguation)
