= Your Jeweler's Showcase =

American TV dramatic anthology series (1952–1953)

Your Jeweler's Showcase is an American television anthology drama series. At least 21 episodes aired on CBS from November 11, 1952, to August 30, 1953. From January 6, 1953, to May 26, 1953, it alternated weekly with Demi-Tasse Tales.

Among its guest stars were Barbara Bates, Bruce Bennett, Julie Bennett, Carl Betz, Mari Blanchard, Fortunio Bonanova, Steve Brodie, Claire Carleton, Marian Carr, Jan Clayton, Phyllis Coates, Whitfield Connor, Chuck Connors, Tim Considine, Lloyd Corrigan, Marcel Dalio, Jim Davis, Ted De Corsia, Thomas Duggan, Richard Erdman, Marilyn Erskine, Edith Evans, Elisabeth Fraser, Richard Gaines, Gladys George, Wilton Graff, Paul Harvey, Myron Healey, Celeste Holm, Lisa Howard, John Hudson, Robert Hutton, Martha Hyer, Barry Kelley, DeForest Kelley, (Note: Although IMDb is the only source directly linking DeForest Kelley to Jeweler's Showcase (specifically, the episode "The Hand of St. Pierre", which aired 10/27/53, starring Bruce Bennett), when this episode was rebroadcast later that decade on two different anthology series (Edward Arnold's Star Showcase and Don Ameche's Play of the Week), the Atlanta native's presence in the cast was duly noted by two local papers.) Walter Kingsford, Joi Lansing, Sheldon Leonard, Jimmy Lydon, Sean McClory, Una Merkel, George Nader, Gerry Pattison Frances Rafferty, Robert Shayne, Arthur Shields, Robert Sweeney, Ray Teal, June Vincent, Ruth Warrick, Ben Welden, Barbara Whiting, Rhys Williams, and Dave Willock.

Hamilton Watch and International Silver sponsored the series.

== Episodes ==
No.	Title	Directed by	Written by	Original release date
TBA	"Delayed Action"	Arthur Ripley	Story by : Sheldon Leonard; Teleplay by : Sheldon Leonard and Frank L. Moss	October 9, 1952
TBA	"Mother Was a Bookmaker"	Leigh Jason	Jack Harvey	October 14, 1952
TBA	"The Miracle at Eagle Creek"	William F. Claxton	Samuel B. Harrison	October 16, 1952
TBA	"Aftermath"	Leigh Jason	Frank L. Moss	October 21, 1952
TBA	"Magic Interlude"	Victor Stoloff	Story by : Jack Laird; Teleplay by : Jack Laird and Frank L. Moss	October 28, 1952
TBA	"Worm In The Apple"	Sheldon Leonard	Sheldon Leonard	November 4, 1952
TBA	"Like The Rich People"	Arthur Ripley	Frank L. Moss	November 11, 1952
TBA	"Juice Man"	Arthur Ripley	Robert Patterson	November 18, 1952
TBA	"Operation E.S.P."	Leigh Jason	Sheldon Leonard	November 18, 1952
TBA	"Weather Clear, Track Fast"	Leigh Jason	Jack Harvey	November 20, 1952
TBA	"Study In Charcoal"	Victor Stoloff	Joseph Cochran	November 25, 1952
TBA	"Street Of Night"	Harold Daniels	Morton S. Fine and David Friedkin	November 27, 1952
TBA	"Teacher Of The Year"	Rod Amateau	Howard Dimsdale	December 2, 1952
TBA	"Tenampa"	Arthur Hilton	Robert Patterson	December 9, 1952
TBA	"Marked X"	Peter Godfrey	Robert Patterson	December 16, 1952
TBA	"Tiger Bait"	Leigh Jason	Story by : Frank Buck; Teleplay by : Sheldon Leonard	December 23, 1952
TBA	"Something For Ginger"	Rod Amateau	Robert Patterson	December 30, 1952
TBA	"Rocking Horse"	Robert Stevenson	Story by : Doris Halman; Teleplay by : Doris Halman	January 13, 1953
TBA	"Three and One-Half Musketeers"	Sheldon Leonard	Sheldon Leonard	January 27, 1953
TBA	"Roman Interlude"	Robert Stevenson	Frank De Felitta	February 10, 1953
TBA	"The Woman of Bally Bunion"	Douglas Heyes	Joseph Cochran	February 24, 1953
TBA	"Bridal Suite"	Tim Whelan	Story by : Joel Judge; Teleplay by : Tim Whelan	March 10, 1953
TBA	"The Bean Farm"	John English	Harold Shumate	March 24, 1953
TBA	"The Monkey's Paw"	Douglas Heyes & Sheldon Leonard	Story by : W.W. Jacobs; Teleplay by : Douglas Heyes	April 7, 1953
TBA	"A Very Old Murder"	Edward L. Cahn	Harold Shumate	April 21, 1953
TBA	"Weekend with Wal'tuh"	Leslie Goodwins	Frank L. Moss	May 5, 1953
TBA	"Heart's Desire"	Robert Spafford	Story by : Nathan Ash; Teleplay by : Robert Spafford	May 19, 1953
TBA	"Never Trust a Lady"	Ralph Murphy	Story by : Victor Canning; Teleplay by : Howard J. Green and Frank L. Moss	June 9, 1953
TBA	"Starbound"	Reginald LeBorg	Don Mankiewicz	September 15, 1953
TBA	"The Lone Rider Of Brooklyn"	Ralph Murphy	Don Mankiewicz and Leon Ware	September 29, 1953
TBA	"Lady's Choice"	Reginald LeBorg	Story by : Richard Burdick and Tim Whelan; Teleplay by : Tim Whelan	October 13, 1953
TBA	"The Hand of St. Pierre"	Sidney Salkow	Story by : Arthur Weiss; Teleplay by : John O'Dea and Sidney Salkow	October 27, 1953
TBA	"Cell 14"	Lew Landers	Lester M. Cook Jr.	November 10, 1953
TBA	"Citizen Chang"	Sheldon Leonard	Unknown	November 24, 1953
TBA	"Christmas Is Magic"	Alfred E. Green	Story by : Frank Martin Webber; Teleplay by : Wallace Bosco	December 8, 1953
TBA	"Farewell To Birdie McKeever"	Jean Yarbrough	Story by : Jane Speed; Teleplay by : Don Brodie	December 22, 1953

== Critical response ==
A review of the premiere episode in the trade publication Variety said that the format had "broad audience appeal", especially to women who would be likely to buy the sponsors' watches and silverware. It said that production was "above par, although somewhat uneven". Reviewing the show's second season opener, "Starbound," a backstage saga penned by Don Mankiewicz, a distinct drop in quality was noted by The Hollywood Reporter, albeit primarily regarding choice of material.

Viewers may like it, feeling they are getting a glimpse behind the scenes. Anyone really behind the scenes will wish they had it so good. [...] Reginald LeBorg directed the sticky story for Sovereign Productions, latter unit being really at fault for choosing the feeble story by Don Mankiewicz as an opener for what last year was a prestige production.
