= David Torrance =

David Torrance may refer to:

- David Torrance (banker) (1805–1876), Canadian president of Bank of Montreal (1873–1876)
- David Torrance (judge) (1840–1906), American Chief Justice of Connecticut Supreme Court
- David Watt Torrance (1862–1923), Scottish medical missionary, head of first hospital in Tiberias, followed by his son, Dr. Herbert Watt Torrance (1892–1977)
- David W. Torrance (born 1924), Church of Scotland minister
- David Torrance (politician) (born 1961), Member of Scottish Parliament for Kirkcaldy since 2011
- David Torrance (journalist) (born 1977), Scottish political commentator

== See also ==
- David Torrence (disambiguation)
