= Torrance family =

The Torrance family includes several prominent modern Scottish theologians and clergymen, primarily associated with the Church of Scotland.

The patriarch of the Torrance family of theologians is Thomas Torrance (1871–1959), a Scottish missionary to China. He was the father of Mary, Thomas F., Grace, Margaret, James, and David.

The first generation after Thomas Torrance include:

- Thomas Forsyth (T. F.) Torrance (1913–2007) – Late Church of Scotland minister and influential theologian who was Professor of Christian Dogmatics at New College, Edinburgh, the University of Edinburgh.
- James (J. B.) Torrance (1923–2003) – Late Church of Scotland minister and Professor of Systematic Theology, University of Aberdeen. Younger brother of Thomas Torrance.
- David W. Torrance (born 1924) – Church of Scotland minister and youngest son of the Torrance family.
- Ronald Wallace (1911–2006) – Late Professor of Biblical Theology at Columbia Theological Seminary. He was married to Mary. His son-in-law, George Newlands, was also an academic theologian.
- Kenneth Mackenzie (1920 - 1971), missionary in Central Africa with his wife, Margaret Torrance.

Well-known second generation theologians of the Torrance family include:

- Iain Richard Torrance (born 1949) – President and Professor of Patristics Emeritus at Princeton Theological Seminary and a former Moderator of the General Assembly of the Church of Scotland. Son of Thomas F. Torrance.
- Alan Torrance (born 1956) – Emeritus Professor of Systematic Theology at St Mary's College, the University of St Andrews. Son of James Torrance.

Theologically active members of the Torrance family's third generation are:

- Andrew Torrance - Professor of Theology and co-founder (with his father, Alan) of the Logos Institute for Analytic and Exegetical Theology at the University of St Andrews.
- David Torrance - Missionary with the Church Mission Society serving in Tanzania as a theological educator. Son of Alan Torrance.
