= Scottish Journal of Theology =

- Discipline: Theology
- Language: English
- Edited by: Ian A. McFarland

Publication details
- History: 1948-present
- Publisher: Cambridge University Press
- Frequency: Quarterly

Standard abbreviations
- ISO 4: Scott. J. Theol.

Indexing
- ISSN: 0036-9306
- LCCN: 71612739
- OCLC no.: 241458086

Links
- Journal homepage

The Scottish Journal of Theology is a quarterly peer-reviewed academic journal of systematic, historical and biblical theology. It was established in 1948 by Thomas F. Torrance and J. K. S. Reid. Former editors-in-chief include Iain Torrance (Universities of Birmingham and Aberdeen, Princeton Theological Seminary), Bryan Spinks (Yale Divinity School), Joe Houston (University of Glasgow), Alastair Heron (Universities of Edinburgh and University of Erlangen), and Alan Lewis (University of Edinburgh and Austin Presbyterian Theological Seminary). The current editor is Ian A. McFarland (Candler School of Theology).

The journal was originally published by Oliver & Boyd (1948-1969) and then subsequently by Cambridge University Press (1970-1974), Scottish Academic Press (1975-1990), and T&T Clark (1991-2001). Cambridge University Press has been the publisher since 2002.

== Abstracting and indexing ==
The journal is abstracted and indexed in:

- New Testament Abstracts
- Old Testament Abstracts
- Arts and Humanities Citation Index
- Religious and Theological Abstracts
- Religion Index One
- FRANCIS
- Humanities Index International
- EBSCOhost
- International Medieval Bibliography

== See also ==
- List of theological journals
