= Daniel Lamont =

Church of Scotland minister and academic

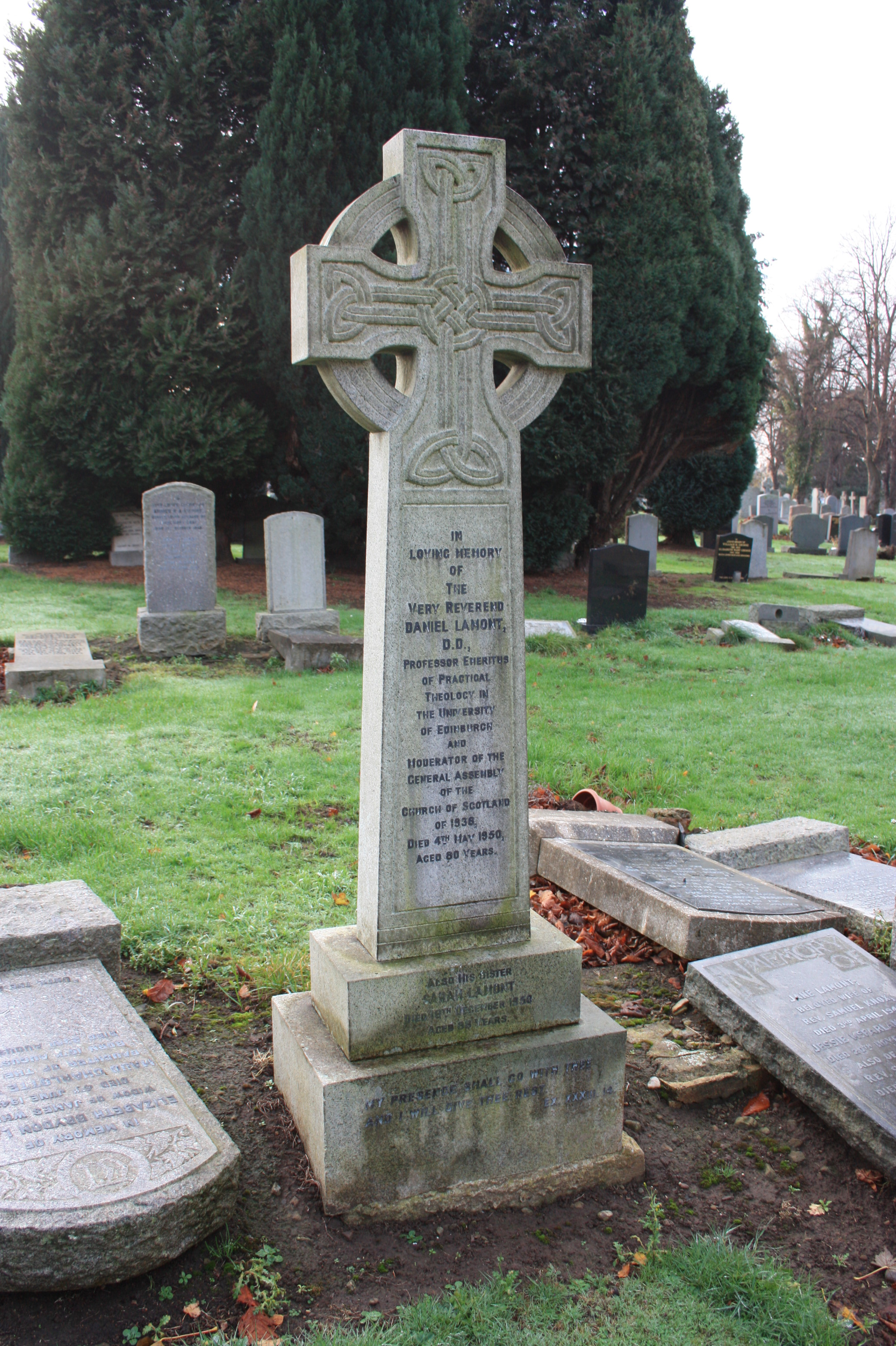
The grave of Lamont, Morningside Cemetery, Edinburgh

Daniel Lamont (1870-1950) was a Church of Scotland minister and academic. He was a Professor of Theology at New College, Edinburgh from 1927 to 1945; and Moderator of the General Assembly of the Church of Scotland from 1936 to 1937.

== Life ==
He was born in Bute and educated at Hutchesons' Grammar School and Glasgow University.

He was Minister at the New Laigh Kirk in Kilmarnock from 1900 to 1904, and also served in Edinburgh, Glasgow, and Helensburgh.

He served as a Professor at New College, Edinburgh teaching Apologetics and Pastoral Theology. His students included Thomas F. Torrance who also later served as Moderator.

He died on 4 May 1950. He is buried in Morningside Cemetery, Edinburgh towards the south-east.

== Books ==
- Studies in the Johannine Writings (1905 reprinted in 1956)
- Fifty Two Sermons by the Rev William Howels, i.e. William Howels.
