= Incident (1948 film) =

1949 film by William Beaudine

- Theatrical release poster
- Directed by: William Beaudine
- Screenplay by: Fred Niblo Jr. Samuel Roeca
- Story by: Harry Lewis
- Produced by: Harry Lewis; Hall Shelton
- Starring: Jane Frazee; Warren Douglas
- Cinematography: Marcel Le Picard
- Edited by: Ace Herman
- Music by: Edward J. Kay
- Production companies: Master Films; Monogram Pictures
- Distributed by: Monogram Pictures
- Release date: October 30, 1948 (United States)
- Running time: 66 minutes
- Country: United States
- Language: English

Incident is a 1948 American film noir directed by William Beaudine and featuring Warren Douglas, Jane Frazee and Robert Osterloh.

== Plot ==
A man is mistaken for a hoodlum and beaten up, leading him to a sordid web of violence and danger.

== Cast ==
- Warren Douglas as Joe Downey
- Jane Frazee as Marion Roberts
- Robert Osterloh as James "Slats" Slattery
- Joyce Compton as Joan
- Anthony Caruso as Nails
- Harry Lauter as Bill
- Eddie Dunn as Lt. Madigan
- Meyer Grace as Knuckles Morgan
- Harry Cheshire as Hartley
- Lynn Millan as Sally O'Brien
- Robert Emmett Keane as Rinsel
- Pierre Watkin as C. W. Sloan
- Gerry Pattison as Secretary in Hartley's office (uncredited)

== Reception ==
Film historian and critic Hal Erickson said of the film: "Incident is one of the slicker directorial accomplishments of B-picture maestro William 'One Take' Beaudine."
