= Gerry Pattison =

American actress (1924–2016)

- Born: Geraldine Marilyn Pattison; January 6, 1924; Santa Monica, California, U.S.
- Died: May 12, 2016 (aged 92)
- Occupation: Actress
- Years active: 1948–1955
- Spouse(s): Kermit Christian Smith m. 1942; div. ? Charles Geza Deversecy m. 1964 – at least 1987
- Children: 1

Geraldine Marilyn Pattison (January 6, 1924 – 2016), known professionally as Gerry Pattison, was an American film and television actress, best remembered as the female lead—and single non-male character—in the 1949 Johnny Mack Brown western, Law of the West. She also appeared opposite Lou Costello, as one of five title characters in the 1954 Abbott and Costello Show episode, "Wife Wanted".

== Early life and career ==
Born January 6, 1924, in Venice, California's Loamshier Hospital, and raised in Santa Monica and Altadena, Pattison was the younger of two children born to Frances Mabel—née Moore—and Warren Simeon Pattison. She received her early dramatic training at the Altadena Foundation School, with the school's director, Mrs. Hazel Johnson. Beginning at the age of eight, she starred, respectively, in Johnson's 1932 staging of Constance McKey's The Princess and the Pixies—as the Princess—and in her 1933 production of Mathilde Bilbro's Geewhilikins, as the Fairy Queen. Pattison later attended Elliot Junior High School and Pasadena Junior College, graduating in 1941. She also attended USC, albeit briefly, where she became a pledge of Gamma Phi Beta. (Note: In retrospect, it appears that both Patterson's college education and her subsequent professional acting debut were dramatically impacted—the former, drastically curtailed; the latter, substantially delayed—by unplanned pregnancy, marriage, and motherhood, circa 1942.)

In the summer of 1947, a newspaper publicity campaign consisting of a few widely disseminated photos of the swimsuit-clad Pattison was followed by uncredited appearances in Stage Struck, Incident, and Joe Palooka in the Big Fight. In December 1948, Boxoffice reported that Pattison had been cast as the female lead in Monogram Pictures' upcoming Johnny Mack Brown vehicle Outlaw Marshal, which, by the time of its February 20 release, had been retitled Law of the West. It was not until as little over three months later, when the film had its New York City premiere at Loew's New York Theatre in a double bill with Gene Autry's The Big Sombrero, that the film was finally reviewed. Variety's Bril dubbed it a "mustang meller [...] [c]ut from an old pattern [and] grooved for the Sat-mat trade and secondary spots on double bills," burdened with "obvious [and] hackneyed" dialogue. As for the performances, Patterson, in "the single femme role", was deemed "fair".

Eight days prior to the film's original release date, a photo of Pattison captioned "At Hollywood's gate" had appeared in the Los Angeles Daily News, accompanying an article promoting the Talent Quest then being conducted jointly by the paper and Fox West Coast, open to professionals and amateurs alike. Referred to in the article as "petite Gerry," one of many "entertainers waiting in the wings for next week's competition," she is described as "a dancer with Harrison Productions."

A few months later, the Los Angeles premiere of Universal Pictures' crime film / teen drama, City Across the River, featured a brief but impactful Pattison appearance, albeit one harkening back to her cheesecake beginnings. Her performance, as the conspicuously big-breasted component of two young people strolling past the film's featured teenage gang, the Amboy Dukes (featuring, notably, the young Tony Curtis and Richard Jaeckel), affords the film a pivotal moment early on: three hitherto squabbling Dukes—namely, the Curtis and Jaeckel characters (plus a third, whose taunting at the hands of Jaeckel had given rise to said squabble)—unite as one to verbally harass and taunt the passing couple. Opining "Say, what a build!" and "Yeah, what a build!", the Dukes then begin crudely aping Pattison's gait before vowing to make her date "into a hamburger". What raises this role above the level of mere walk-on—and her boyfriend's immediate prospects above that of ground beef—is Patterson's urgent, impassioned three-sentence plea, successfully persuading her initially defiant companion not to "mess with them".

Subsequently, Pattison appeared briefly in Bad Boy, war hero Audie Murphy's screen acting debut, portraying the decidedly skeptical girlfriend of Murphy's former partner in crime, Joe Shields (William F. Leicester).

In the 1950s, Pattison's noteworthy work was confined to the small screen. First, there was "The Caboose Story," a 1952 episode of the Brian Donlevy series, Dangerous Assignment, wherein the protagonist's roughly 50-second consultation with Pattison—portraying a WAC corporal stationed at the U.S. Army Transportation Corps office in Japan—jump-starts the hitherto stalled investigation that comprises this episode's main storyline. The following year, Pattison performed much the same function, plot-wise (albeit strictly as a voice actress), in "Farewell to Birdie McKeever" (the final episode in the short-lived dramatic anthology series, Your Jeweler's Showcase). Finally, Patterson—paired with Claudia Barrett as the final two of five title characters—opposite Lou Costello in the Abbott and Costello Show episode, "Wife Wanted", featuring Lou's ill-fated intervention in a heated dispute between Cora (Pattison) and Dora (Barrett) over the rightful ownership of a trombone, wherein his attempt to play Solomon—culminating in a comic variant on that judge's signature ruling—succeeds only in uniting the two in wreaking vengeance upon their ostensibly trombone-wrecking suitor.

== Personal life and death ==
In April 1942, the Pasadena Star-News relayed her parents' announcement of Pattison's March 21 marriage to Kermit Christian Smith of Winton, California, a United States Navy enlistee then stationed at the San Diego Naval Hospital, where the newlyweds were currently making their home. Their union produced one child, a daughter, born October 30 of that year. This marriage was, at the latest, terminated prior to 1948 (at which point the already remarried Smith was celebrating the birth of a newborn), and, quite possibly, before even 1944, at which point Smith listed his mother, rather than his wife, as the emergency contact person on his draft registration form. On October 2, 1964, Pattison married Hungarian-born Charles Geza Deversecy, (né Karl Karoly Verseczy), who died in 1997. For at least the final 15 of those years, the couple resided in Carmel, California.

Pattison died in 2016.

== Filmography ==
=== Films ===
- Stage Struck (1948) – Girl in night club (uncredited)
- Incident (1948) – Secretary in Hartley's office (uncredited)
- Joe Palooka in the Big Fight (1948) – Bobby soxer (uncredited)
- Law of the West (1949) – Tennessee Lane
- City Across the River (1949) – "What a build" Girl (uncredited)
- Bad Boy (1949) – Joe Shields' girlfriend (uncredited)
- Girls in the Night (1953) – Sorority girl (uncredited)
- Women's Prison (1955) – Inmate
- Son of Sinbad (1955) – Raider (uncredited)

=== Television ===
- Jackson and Jill (1949)
  - Unknown episode(s) – Unknown role(s)
- Dangerous Assignment
  - Ep. "The Caboose Story" (1952) – WAC Corporal (as Geraldine Pattison)
- Your Jeweler's Showcase
  - Ep. "Farewell to Birdie McKeever" (1953) – Miss Calhoun (voice only).
- The Abbott and Costello Show
  - Ep. "Wife Wanted" (1954) – Cora (as Jerry Pattison)
