= Wolfgang Achtner =

- Born: 2 September 1957
- Died: 31 October 2017 (aged 60)
- Occupation: Theologism

Wolfgang Achtner (2 September 1957 – 31 October 2017) was a theologist who played a key role as an ambassador for the science-and-religion dialogue in Germany.

== Career ==
Achtner studied systematic theology and the Old Testament in Mainz, Göttingen, and Heidelberg. His dissertation focused on the science-and-religion dialogue in the work of Thomas F. Torrance. He then undertook a one-year research fellowship in Heidelberg. While a parish minister in Mainz, he earned an additional degree in mathematics.

He worked on the concept of natural law and its role in the science and theology dialogue during a sabbatical year at Princeton Theological Seminary.

He won the Kleines Lutherstipendium for the translation of his own book Dimensionen der Zeit into English (Dimensions of Time, 2002).

He founded the Local Society Initiative Group at Giessen, and won a stipend for the Templeton Oxford Seminars in Science and Christianity. He was a member of ESSAT and the Protestant Academy of Arnoldshain. He lectured in Germany, France, Great Britain, Switzerland, and the United States. Achtner was editor of the Giessen University Sermons and the newsletter Science and Religion (in German).

== Publications ==
=== Books ===
- Dimensionen der Zeit: die Zeitstrukturen Gottes, der Welt, und des Menschen Wolfgang Achtner, Stefan Kunz, Thomas Walter, Primus, 1998 ISBN 978-3-89678-078-2, translated as Dimensions of time: the structures of the time of humans, of the world, and of God W.B. Eerdmans Pub., 2002 ISBN 978-0-8028-4998-4
- Künstliche Intelligenz und menschliche Person, Vol 91 of Marburger theologische Studien, Elwert, 2006 ISBN 978-3-7708-1289-9
- Vom Erkennen zum Handeln: Die Dynamisierung von Mensch und Natur im ausgehenden Mittelalter als Voraussetzung für die Entstehung naturwissenschaftlicher Rationalität Vol 12 of Religion, Theologie und Naturwissenschaft, Vandenhoeck & Ruprecht, 2008 ISBN 978-3-525-56983-2
- Physik, Mystik und Christentum: Eine Darstellung und Diskussion der natürlichen Theologie bei T.F. Torrance, Vol 438 of Europäische Hochschulschriften, P. Lang, 1991 ISBN 978-3-631-44364-4
- Gott - Geist - Gehirn: Religiöse Erfahrungen im Lichte der neuesten Hirnforschung, Vol 133 of Arnoldshainer Texte, Haag + Herchen, 2005 ISBN 978-3-89846-356-0
- Die Chaostheorie: Geschichte, Gestalt, Rezeption, EZW-Texte; 135 Evangel. Zentralstelle für Weltanschauungsfragen, 1997
