= Bad Boy (1949 film) =

1950 film by Kurt Neumann

- Original film poster
- Directed by: Kurt Neumann
- Written by: Robert Hardy Andrews; Paul Short; Karl Kamb
- Produced by: Paul Short
- Starring: Audie Murphy; Lloyd Nolan; Jane Wyatt
- Cinematography: Karl Struss
- Edited by: William Austin; Otho Lovering
- Music by: Paul Sawtell
- Production company: Paul Short Productions
- Distributed by: Allied Artists Pictures
- Release date: February 22, 1949
- Running time: 86 minutes
- Country: United States
- Language: English
- Budget: $375,000

Bad Boy is a 1949 American drama film directed by Kurt Neumann and starring Audie Murphy, Lloyd Nolan and Jane Wyatt. It was Murphy's first leading role. It was distributed by the independent studio Allied Artists.

== Plot ==
Orphan Danny Lester is a delinquent boy of seventeen who is on the run from the law. He has temporarily taken refuge working as a bellboy in a hotel in Texas, and robs a game of dice taking place at the hotel. He is caught and sentenced to twenty years by Judge Florence Prentiss. It is decided he is to serve in a juvenile reformatory until he is old enough to serve in an actual prison.

Marshal Brown is superintendent of the Variety Club's Boys' Ranch and pleads to the judge that Danny be put in his custody on the ranch instead of the reformatory, and the judge agrees. Marshal and his co-worker "Chief" take Danny to the ranch, where he meets some of the other boys residing there.

Danny behaves badly towards Chief and is ridiculed in front of the other boys, who make fun of him after that. Danny is put on kitchen duty under the nice Mrs. Brown. Still he is a hellraiser, and one night he steals a horse, rides into the nearest town and burglarizes a jewelry store of its cash. He mails the money in an envelope to himself at the ranch.

When Danny gets into a fight with two of the other boys who make fun of him, Chief tells them to settle it in the boxing ring. Danny ultimately wins by foul play and is even more detested by the other boys, who all give him the silent treatment.

Marshal wants to help Danny out, making him join a game of makeshift polo, and after the game, Danny wants to buy the horse that Ted owns and buys it with all the money he has for $200. Marshal becomes suspicious, wondering where Danny has gotten money from to buy a horse.

Marshal decides to make an effort to improve Danny's attitude. He talks to Danny's stepfather, Arnold Strawn. He also gets a story from Lila Strawn, Danny's stepsister, who claims that Danny killed his mother by poisoning her.

The truth is that Danny tried to help her by sneaking medicine to her to help cure her illness. Unfortunately, the pills Danny got were sleeping pills, and his mother dies in her sleep. After being accused of murder by Lila, Danny beat Arnold and ran away.

As Marshal begins to fathom the causes of Danny's behavior, Danny again escapes the ranch, this time stealing from a store for clothes and a gun. He is caught red-handed and shot at by the sheriff as he escapes on a horse. A bullet wounds the horse, which later bleeds to death.

The sheriff comes to the ranch the next day, asking for the guilty boy. Danny escapes by stealing a car and is chased by the police. He ultimately crashes the car into a tree and runs into the woods, injured and shocked.

Meanwhile, Mrs. Brown has received a message that Danny's stepfather and stepsister have been killed in an explosion. Marshal investigates the death of Danny's mother and finds out she actually died from natural causes and not from the sleeping pills that Danny gave her.

Marshal goes after Danny into the woods and finds him. After telling him what he found out about the death of his mother, Danny gives himself up to the police and is taken to a hospital. There he is visited by a former accomplice, Joe, the one who helped rob the dice game in the hotel. Joe gets past the police guards, and tries to stop Danny from telling on him.

Joe tries to help Danny escape and knocks out the policeman guarding the room, when Mrs. Brown enters. She tells Danny that she and her husband want to help him, but Joe points a gun at her. Danny overpowers Joe, and Marshal and Chief come to the rescue.

Back in court, Marshall stands up for Danny, and he is only sentenced to another six months at the ranch. This time Danny's attitude is changed and he comes out of there a better man, who goes on to study engineering at Texas A & M to lead a normal, good life.

== Cast ==
- Audie Murphy as Danny Lester
- Lloyd Nolan as Marshall Brown
- Jane Wyatt as Mrs. Maud Brown
- James Gleason as Chief
- Stanley Clements as Bitsy Johnson
- Martha Vickers as Lila Strawn
- Rhys Williams as Arnold Strawn
- Selena Royle as Judge Florence Prentiss
- Jimmy Lydon as Ted Hendry
- Dickie Moore as Charlie
- Tommy Cook as Floyd
- William F. Leicester as Joe Shields (as William Lester)
- Gerry Pattison as Blonde with Joe (uncredited)

== Production ==
Despite having been a decorated combat veteran five years previously, Murphy convincingly played a youthful teenager in the film. He was cast at the insistence of Texas theater owners who helped finance the film. This was his third film following Beyond Glory and Texas Brooklyn and Heaven but this was his first lead.

Toward the end of the film is the appended acknowledgement from producer Paul Short, thanking Variety Clubs International, "which has 8,000 members—representing 17,000 theatres and is operating 100 charitable institutions in 43 cities and has expended twenty-two million dollars benefitting [sic] five million underprivileged children."

The ranch scenes were not filmed on the actual Variety Clubs ranch in Texas that inspired the film, but instead in Thousand Oaks, California.

== Release ==
The film was released in the 43 cities with Variety Clubs.

== Reception ==
Variety said Murphy as "an ingratiating personality and some latent thespic ability that should register with the younger set of filmgoers" and "With plenty of good story points to support it, Bad Boy nevertheless has some critical weaknesses that keep ‘its overall score from being 100%. Deficiencies are largely plot holes that leave some of the motivation foggy."

Short later made The Kid from Texas with Murphy.
