= Michael Banner =

English theologian (b. 1961)

Michael Banner (born 1961) is an English theologian who is Dean and Fellow of Trinity College, Cambridge. From 2004–2006 he was Director of the UK Economic and Social Research Council's Genomics Research Forum and Professor of Public Policy and Ethics in the Life Sciences at the University of Edinburgh, and from 1994 to 2004 F.D. Maurice Professor of Moral and Social Theology, King’s College, London. Well known in science and public policy arenas, he was also a member of the Human Tissue Authority, Chairman of the Home Office Animal Procedures Committee from 1998 to 2006 and a member of the Nuffield Council on Bioethics from 2014 to 2016.

Banner read Philosophy and Theology at Balliol College, Oxford (MA 1985, DPhil 1986). Appointments have included Bampton Research Fellow, St Peter's College, Oxford; Dean, Chaplain, Fellow and Director of Studies in Philosophy and Theology, Peterhouse, Cambridge; and FD Maurice Professor of Moral and Social Theology, King's College, London. He has been chairman of HM Government Committee of Enquiry on the Ethics of Emerging Technologies in Breeding Farm Animals and the CJD Incidents Panel, Department of Health. He has also been a member of the Royal Commission on Environmental Pollution and the Agriculture and Environment Biotechnology Commission.

Apart from his government appointments, Banner came to prominence with his book Christian Ethics and Contemporary Moral Problems, concerning which Stanley Hauerwas wrote that Banner is "one of the brightest and most interesting young people doing ethics on the scene today".

Banner was the Peden Visiting Scholar in the Department of Anthropology at Rice University in early 2012, and gave the Bampton Lectures in Oxford in 2013, resulting in The Ethics of Everyday Life: Moral Theology, Social Anthropology, and the Imagination of the Human (Oxford University Press).

In 2022 Banner publicly defended the views of a post-doctoral junior named Joshua Heath, a Junior Research Fellow of Trinity College, Cambridge, who had preached a sermon in the College chapel in which he (not Banner) had suggested that the wounds of Jesus had a "vaginal appearance" and that the body of Christ "is also the trans body." Throughout the sermon he drew attention to "Christ's penis" as well what he called the savior's "vulvic side wound." He stated that Christ's "deeds could be interpreted as showing phallic virility" as well as "yonic fecundity." He reimagined the story of Catherine of Siena drinking from Christ's wound as an erotic experience in which her thirst is "slaked" on the crucified Lord. Worshippers reportedly left in disgust at the end of the service, and one sent a letter of protest to Banner. Banner was quoted in the Times as saying the preacher's views were a "legitimate" treatment of medieval artistic representations of the crucifixion and that his own response was then “grossly misrepresented”.

== Publications ==
As author

- The Justification of Science and the Rationality of Religious Belief. Clarendon Press. 1990. ISBN 978-0198248217.
- Christian Ethics and Contemporary Moral Problems. Cambridge University Press. 1999. ISBN 978-0521625548.
- The Practice of Abortion: A Critique. Darton, Longman and Todd. 1999. ISBN 978-0232523089.
- Christian Ethics: A Brief History. Wiley. 2009. ISBN 978-1405115179.
- The Ethics of Everyday Life: Moral Theology, Social Anthropology and the Imagination of the Human. Oxford University Press. 2014. ISBN 978-0198722069.

As editor

- Torrance, Alan; Banner, Michael, eds. (2006). The Doctrine of God and Theological Ethics. Bloomsbury Academic. ISBN 978-0567084514.
