= Kenneth Mackenzie (missionary) =

Scottish Presbyterian missionary in Central Africa (1920–1971)

Kenneth Mackenzie (29 June 1920 – 17 February 1971) was a minister of the Church of Scotland, who served as a foreign missionary in Central Africa, and was later a founder of the anti-apartheid movement within Scotland.

== Biography ==
Kenneth Mackenzie was born on 29 June 1920 in Strathpeffer, Ross-shire. He attended Fodderty Primary School (1926–32) and Dingwall Academy (1932–37). In 1940 he graduated with an MA from Aberdeen University. He began studying for the ministry at Edinburgh's Free Church College (1940–42) before transferring to the Church of Scotland's New College, Edinburgh from which he graduated in 1944. In April 1944, he was licensed as a minister of the Church of Scotland. He was ordained, by the Presbytery of Edinburgh, on 24 April 1945.

He was posted initially to Malawi (then called Nyasaland) to the Blantyre mission, where he served at Mulanje from 1946 to 1947, and then continued his language learning at Zomba until 1948. He was then transferred to Northern Rhodesia (now Zambia) and between 1948 and 1950 he served in Lubwa. After this, he returned to Edinburgh, where he served in the Foreign Mission Offices of the Church of Scotland for two years (1950–52). Subsequently, he returned to Northern Rhodesia, posted to Chitambo, where between 1952 and 1954 he was able to study regional cultures.

Mackenzie's vision was to raise awareness of Central Africa and its situation among the people of Scotland, and in particular the people of the Church of Scotland. He was also involved in reshaping the Church in the region, playing an important part in transferring mission schools to government control, and in talks on Church union. He also successfully pressed on the Northern Rhodesian Christian Council the importance of creating a Central African Federation to safeguard African interests. Indeed, he became the confidant of African leaders as nations moved towards independence from European powers.

Mackenzie served with the Foreign Mission Committee in Blantyre until 1956 when he returned to Scotland. He had married Margaret Ramsay Torrance in 1944, and her ill-health forces their return. Margaret was part of the famous Torrance family within the Church of Scotland.

On 31 August 1957, he was seconded to St Colm's College in Edinburgh as a tutor, where he remained for over a decade. In 1968, he was called to the congregation of Old Restalrig Parish Church where he served as a parish minister until his death, after a short illness, on 17 February 1971, age 50. His widow, Margaret, lived until aged 86 in 2004. Together, they had a daughter, Fiona.

During his last years in Scotland, he played a major part in organising resistance to the Central African Federation, campaigning across churches, trade unions and political parties, particularly through the Scottish Council for African Questions. He was also one of the founders of the anti-apartheid movement on Scotland, particularly though the Scottish Anti-apartheid Association, writing letters and numerous articles on the situation in Africa. He also served as secretary to the General Assembly of the Church of Scotland's committee on Central Africa, which was convened by Lord MacLeod of Fuinary.

His collected papers are held in the Library of Edinburgh University.
