= Alan Torrance =

British theologian (born 1956)

Alan Torrance (born 1956) is a Scottish theologian, academic and ordained minister of the Church of Scotland.

Torrance was ordained as a minister in the Church of Scotland in 1984. His academic career began at the Knox Theological Hall and the University of Otago, Dunedin, New Zealand. He then moved to King's College London where he was a senior lecturer in systematic theology from 1993 to 1998. He was also director of its Research Institute in Systematic Theology. From 1998 to 1999, he served as senior research fellow at the Erasmus Institute, University of Notre Dame. In 1998 or 1999, he joined St Mary's College of the University of St Andrews as Professor of Systematic Theology. He is now professor emeritus.

He is part of the Torrance family of Scottish theologians. His uncle was the famous theologian Thomas F. Torrance, former Professor of Systematic Theology at New College, Edinburgh, who served as Moderator of the General Assembly of the Church of Scotland in 1976. His father, J.B. Torrance was professor at Aberdeen and wrote the influential Worship, Community and the Triune God of Grace. His uncle David W. Torrance was a Church of Scotland minister and author, until his retirement in 1991. His cousin is Iain Torrance, former president of Princeton Theological Seminary, Pro-Chancellor of the University of Aberdeen and Dean of the Chapel Royal in Scotland, and another former Moderator of the General Assembly. His uncle, Ronald Wallace, was Professor of Biblical Theology at Columbia Theological Seminary. Alan Torrance's sons have continued in the theological and academic line.

His teaching interests are primarily in the areas of philosophical and systematic theology, theological anthropology, person and work of Christ and theological ethics. He researches actively in the fields of Christology, the social implications of the doctrine of reconciliation, theological epistemology and theories of time. He is widely published and respected in his field and now closely associated with the Logos Institute for Analytic and Exegetical Theology at the University of St Andrews.

== Publications ==
His publications include

- Christ and Context T&T Clark, 1993.
- Persons in Communion: an Essay on Trinitarian Description and Human Participation T&T Clark, 1996.
- 'Theology and "Political Correctness"' in Studies in Harmful Religion ed. Andrew Walker, S.P.C.K. 1997.
- 'Creatio ex nihilo and the Spatio-Temporal Dimensions, with special reference to Jurgen Moltmann and D. C. Williams', in The Doctrine of Creation, ed. Colin Gunton, T&T Clark, 1997.
- 'The Trinity' in The Cambridge Companion to Karl Barth, ed. John Webster, Cambridge University Press, 2000.
- 'On Determining Whether Homosexuality Is To Be Endorsed Theologically', in More than a single issue, eds. M. Rae & G. Redding, Australian Theological Forum, 2000
- 'Jesus in Christian Doctrine' in The Cambridge Companion to Jesus, ed. M. Bockmuehl, CUP, 2001.
- 'Justification' in Oxford Companion of Christian Thought, Oxford University Press.
- 'God, Personhood and Particularity: On Whether There Is, or Should Be, a Distinctive Male Theological Perspective', in Gospel and Gender, ed. Douglas Campbell, T&T Clark, 2003.
- '"Call No Man Father!": The Trinity, Patriarchy and God-Talk', in Gospel and Gender, ed. Douglas Campbell, T&T Clark, 2003.
- The Doctrine of God and Theological Ethics, ed. A. J. Torrance & M. Banner, T&T Clark/Continuum, 2006.
- The Theological Grounds for Advocating Forgiveness and Reconciliation in the Sociopolitical Realm, Centre for Contemporary Christianity in Ireland, 2006
- Scripture's Doctrine and Theology's Bible: How the New Testament Shapes Christian Dogmatics, ed. Markus Bockmuehl and Alan Torrance, Baker Academic, 2008.
- 'Society, Scepticism and the Problem of Moral Inversion: Some Reflections on Michael Polanyi's Social Philosophy' in Critical Conversations: Michael Polanyi and Christian Theology, ed. Murray Rae, Wipf & Stock, 2012.
