= Postfoundationalism =

Philosophical subfield

Postfoundationalism is a theory of epistemology denoting a rejection of an assumed or given authority for a specific action or belief, but arguing, in dialectical fashion, for a rationale for action or belief. The term was originally used in philosophical theology, although since that time it has been used in wider philosophical discourse.

== See also ==
- Anti-foundationalism
- Metaepistemology
