= Torrence =

Torrence is an originally Scottish surname. Notable people with the name include:

- A. Andrew Torrence (1902–1940), American politician
- Andrew P. Torrence (c. 1921–1980), African-American university administrator
- David Torrence (1864–1951), Scottish-born actor
- Dean Torrence (born 1940), American singer, the Dean of 1960s singing group Jan and Dean
- Ernest Torrence (1878–1933), Scottish actor
- Eve Torrence (born 1963), American mathematician
- Gwen Torrence (born 1965), American Olympic sprinter
- Leigh Torrence (born 1982), American professional football player
- Maria Torrence Wishart (1893 – 1982), Canadian medical illustrator and the founder of the University of Toronto's Art as Applied to Medicine program
- Michael Torrence (1961–1996), American serial killer
- Nate Torrence (born 1977), American comedic actor
- O'Cyrus Torrence (born 2000), American football player
- Ridgely Torrence (1874–1950), poet and editor
- Walt Torrence (1936/1937–1969), American basketball player

== See also ==
- 2614 Torrence, minor planet
- Torrance (disambiguation), includes list of people with name Torrance
- Torrent (disambiguation), includes a list of people with name Torrent
