= Livingstone College, London =

Missionary college in England

Coordinates: 51.577°N 0.005°W

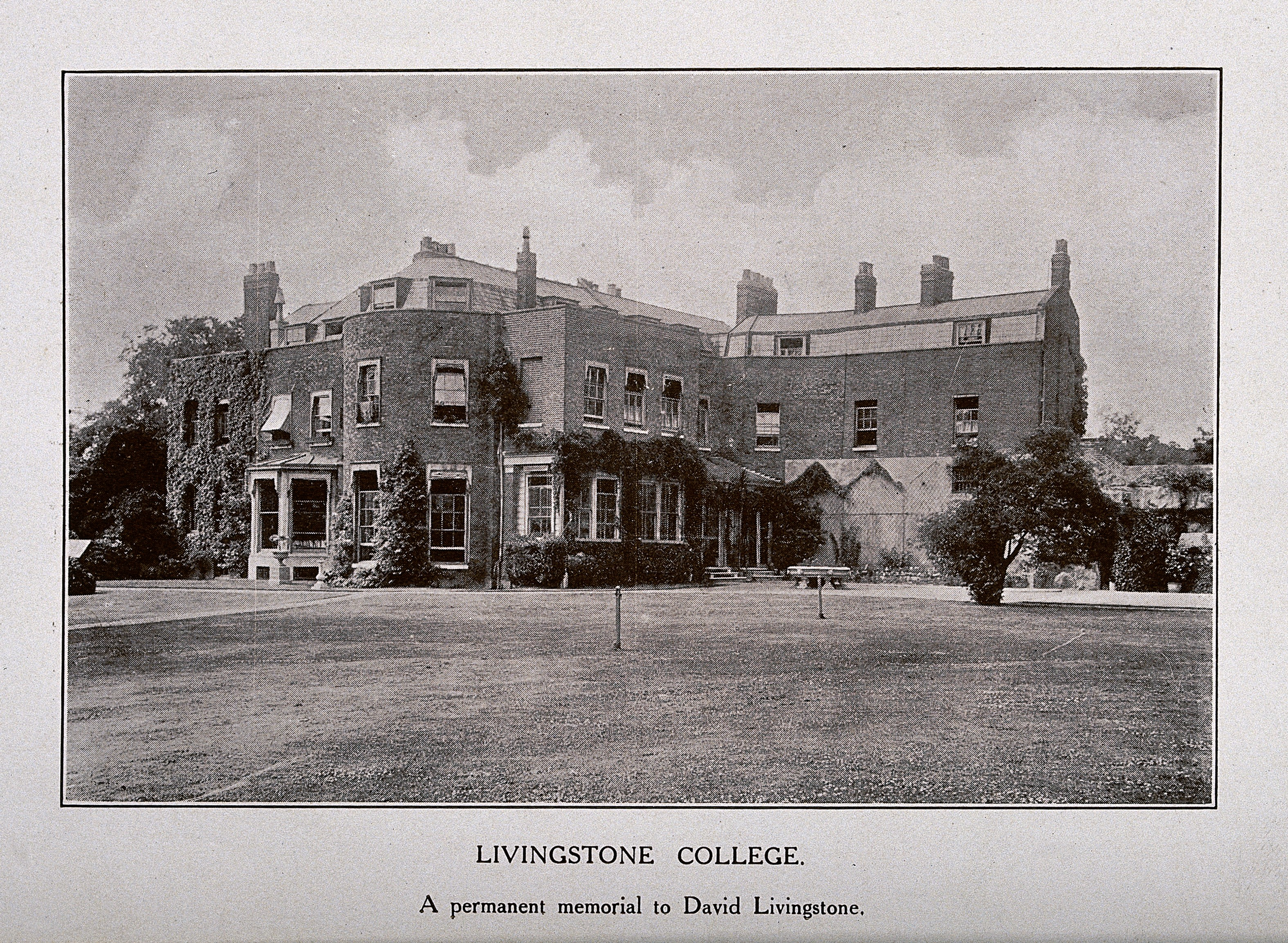
- Livingstone College. Credit: Wellcome Collection
- Active: 1893–1914
- Location: London, England, United Kingdom

Livingstone College, established 1893 is a former college for Christian missionaries in Leyton, London, England. It was named after the Scottish physician and missionary David Livingstone. Its purpose was to provide education to missionaries going to tropical countries in the elements of medicine. Training was given over a 9-month programme.

The site of the college, postcode E10 6SJ is now occupied by a street named Greg Close.

== Known students ==
- Edwin W. Smith
