= Ian A. McFarland =

American Lutheran theologian (born 1963)

- Born: Ian Alexander McFarland; 1963 (age 62–63); Hartford, CT
- Spouse: Ann Lillya

Academic background
- Education: Trinity College (Connecticut); Union Theological Seminary; Lutheran School of Theology at Chicago; Yale University
- Thesis: Teaching with Authority (1995)
- Doctoral advisor: Kathryn Tanner

Academic work
- Discipline: Theology
- Sub-discipline: Systematic theology
- School or tradition: Lutheranism
- Institutions: University of Aberdeen; Emory University; Selwyn College, Cambridge

Ian Alexander McFarland (born 1963) is an American Lutheran theologian who has served since 2019 as Robert W. Woodruff Professor of Theology at Emory University's Candler School of Theology, His books include The Hope of Glory: A Theology of Redemption (2024), The Word Made Flesh: A Theology of the Incarnation (2019), From Nothing: A Theology of Creation (2014), In Adam's Fall: A Meditation on the Christian Doctrine of Original Sin (2010), and The Divine Image: Envisioning the Invisible God (2005).

== Career ==
McFarland holds degrees from Trinity College (Hartford), Union Theological Seminary (New York), the Lutheran School of Theology at Chicago, the University of Cambridge and Yale University.

He taught at the University of Aberdeen from 1998 to 2005. He taught from 2005 to 2015 at Candler School of Theology. From 2015 to 2019 he was the Regius Professor of Divinity at the University of Cambridge. He returned to Candler in 2019.

McFarland was editor of the Scottish Journal of Theology from 2015-2025. He is a former fellow of Selwyn College, Cambridge, and a member of the Evangelical Lutheran Church in America. He has served as one of the ELCA representatives on rounds 12 and 13 of the U.S. Lutheran–Catholic Dialogue and is currently a member of the 19th Session of the international Lutheran-Orthodox Dialogue.

== Personal life ==
McFarland is married to retired oboist Ann Lillya, with whom he has two daughters.

== Publications ==
=== Books ===
The Hope of Glory: A Theology of Redemption. Westminster John Knox Press, 2024

The Word Made Flesh: A Theology of the Incarnation. Westminster John Knox Press, 2019

From Nothing: A Theology of Creation. Westminster John Knox, 2014

Co-editor, The Cambridge Dictionary of Christian Theology. Cambridge University Press, 2011

In Adam's Fall: A Meditation on the Christian Doctrine of Original Sin. Wiley-Blackwell, 2010

Editor, Creation and Humanity. Westminster John Knox Press, 2009

The Divine Image: Envisioning the Invisible God. Fortress Press, 2005

Difference and Identity: A Theological Anthropology. Pilgrim Press, 2001

Listening to the Least: Doing Theology from the Outside In. Pilgrim Press, 1998

=== Chapters and articles ===
"Christ and Creation," in The T&T Clark Handbook of the Doctrine of Creation. Ed. Jason Goroncy. London: Bloomsbury Academic, 2024, pp. 250–259.

"The Extra Calvinisticum and the Question of Where God Is," Neue Zeitschrift für Systematische Theologie und Relgionsphilosophie 65/3 (2023): 307-18.

"Rethinking Nature and Grace: The Logic of Creation’s Consummation," International Journal of Systematic Theology 24/1 (January 2022): 56-79.

"Sin and the Limits of Theology: A Reflection in Conversation with Julian of Norwich and Martin Luther," in International Journal of Systematic Theology 22/2 (April 2020): 147-168.

"Being Perfect: A Lutheran Perspective on Moral Formation," in Studies in Christian Ethics 33/1 (2019): 15-26.

"The Gift of the Non aliud: Creation from Nothing as a Metaphysics of Abundance," in International Journal of Systematic Theology 21/1 (January 2019): 44-58.

''The Upward Call': The Category of Vocation and the Oddness of Human Nature," in The Christian Doctrine of Humanity, Zondervan, 2018

"The Problem with Evil," Theology Today 74/4. January 1, 2019

"Present in Love: Rethinking Barth on the Divine Perfections," Modern Theology 33/2. April 1, 2017

"Original Sin," in the T&T Clark Companion to the Doctrine of Sin. Bloomsbury T & T Clark, 2016

"What Does It Mean To See Someone? Icons and Identity," in The Image of God in an Image-Driven Age: Explorations in Theological Anthropology. Intervarsity Press, 2016

"'Always and Everywhere': Divine Presence and the Incarnation," in The Gift of Theology: The Contribution of Kathryn Tanner. Fortress, 2015

"Theology of the Will," in The Oxford Handbook of Maximus the Confessor. Oxford University Press, 2015

"The Saving God," in Sanctified by Grace. Bloomsbury, 2014

"Spirit and Incarnation: Toward a Pneumatic Chalcedonianism," in International Journal of Systematic Theology, 16:2. April 1, 2014

Academic offices
Preceded by David F. Ford	Regius Professor of Divinity at the University of Cambridge; 2015–2019	Succeeded by David Fergusson
