= David W. Torrance =

- Church of Scotland minister
- Church: Church of Scotland

Personal details
- Born: 22 June 1924 (age 102) Scotland, United Kingdom
- Denomination: Presbyterian
- Parents: Thomas Torrance; Annie Elizabeth Sharpe

David Wishart Torrance (born 22 June 1924) is a retired Church of Scotland minister and part of the well-known Torrance family of theologians and Christian ministers.

== Early life ==
Torrance was the youngest of six children to Church of Scotland minister, Rev Thomas Torrance (1871–1959), and Annie Elizabeth Torrance (nee. Sharp)(1883–1980), both missionaries to Chengdu, Sichuan of West China. Like all his siblings, Torrance was born in China (at Cheng-tu, West China), on 22 June 1924.

In 1927, the family left China to travel to Scotland. When the family were settled in Scotland, Thomas Torrance returned to China for seven years until his retirement in 1935. He became a Christian aged five.

He was educated at Bellshill Academy (1929-30), James Gillespie (1930-36), Royal High (1936-39, 41-42), Maybole Academy (1939-40) and Blairgowrie High (1940-41).

He studied at Edinburgh University from 1942-1943, and again from 1946-53 and 1954-55.

== War Service ==
He served with the Royal Scots in 1942-1946, and the Royal Signals from 1944-46. Served with the 115 Assault Brigade and 14 Indian Division.

== Ministry ==
Like his two brothers, Thomas F. Torrance and James B. Torrance, David became a church minister in the Church of Scotland. His three sisters all married Church of Scotland ministers.

He was assistant at Edinburgh: Broughton Place (1950-52) and Haddington: St Mary's (1952-53). He was licensed by the Presbytery of Edinburgh on 16 April 1953.

He was ordained on 14 November 1955, aged 31. He served in three parishes across Scotland; Livingston (14 Nov 1955-1969), Summerhill Church in Aberdeen (2 May 1969-1977), and Earlston (1977-1991) in the Scottish Borders.

Unlike his two brothers, he did not go onto academic work. David continued in church ministry until his retirement from Earlston Parish Church on 30 November 1991 after 36 years of active ministry.

He published a series of memoirs titled 'The Reluctant Minister' in 2015.

== Personal life ==
He married Mary Elizabeth (Elizabeth) Barton (b. 8 June 1924) on 31 December 1957. She was a medical practitioner who died in 2008. He had three children, Elizabeth Grace (Grace), David and Ruth. His son - also named David Torrance - followed his father into Church of Scotland ministry. He died in October 2023 while minister of Pencaitland Parish Church.

He now lives in North Berwick. And, according to the Church of Scotland's records of 2023-2024, only eight other surviving Church of Scotland ministers have been ordained longer than him. In the 2025 - 2026 yearbook, it stated that only two other former Church of Scotland ministers who were currently living had been ordained earlier than him. He turned 100 on 22 June 2024.

== See also ==
- Torrance family
