= J. B. Torrance =

Scottish protestant theologian and biblical scholar

James B. Torrance
- Born: 3 February 1923
- Died: 15 November 2003 (aged 80)
- Occupations: Theologian, biblical scholar
- Title: Erstwhile Professor of Systematic Theology, University of Aberdeen
- Parent(s): Thomas Torrance; Annie Elizabeth Sharp
- Relatives: Thomas F. Torrance (brother); David W. Torrance (brother)

Academic background
- Education: Marburg and Basel
- Alma mater: Edinburgh
- Influences: Karl Barth

Academic work
- Discipline: Biblical theology
- Sub-discipline: Systematic theology
- Doctoral students: Jeremy Begbie

James B. Torrance (3 February 1923 – 15 November 2003) was a Scottish Protestant theologian, biblical scholar and academic. He was Professor of Systematic Theology at the University of Aberdeen.

== Biography ==
Born in China into the Torrance family of Scottish theologians, to Scottish missionaries to China Thomas Torrance (1871–1959) and Annie Elizabeth Torrance (1883–1980), James was a younger brother to Thomas F. Torrance and father of Alan Torrance. Torrance was educated in Edinburgh, receiving first class degrees in philosophy (for which he was also awarded senior medals in moral philosophy, logic and metaphysics) and theology. Following this he continued his studies in Marburg and Basel, where he studied with Karl Barth, and then continued research in Oxford.

Torrance took a special interest in international politics, being a staunch opponent of Apartheid, and engaging directly with President F. W. de Klerk. He also engaged with Gerry Adams.

He gave the 1994 Didsbury Lectures (published as Worship, Community and the Triune God of Grace) and the 2001 Warfield Lectures at Princeton.

== Works ==
A Festschrift was prepared in honor of Torrance, as well as one which engages the theology of the three Torrance brothers, T. F., James, and David.

=== Books ===
- Torrance, James B. (1996). Worship, Community and the Triune God of Grace. The 1994 Didsbury Lectures. London: Paternoster.
- ———; Walls, Roland (1992). John Duns Scotus in a Nutshell. Edinburgh: Handsel Press.

=== Articles and chapters ===
- ———; Barclay, Oliver; Boyd, Robert; MacKay, Donald (1953). "The Nature of the Problem". Where Science and Faith Meet. London: InterVarsity Press. pp. 7–13. ISBN 978-0851100036.
- ——— (1970). "Covenant and Contract, a Study of the Theological Background of Worship in seventeenth-century Scotland". Scottish Journal of Theology. 23: 51–76. doi:10.1017/S0036930600021062.
- ——— (1973). "The Contribution of McLeod Campbell to Scottish Theology". Scottish Journal of Theology. 26 (3): 295–311. doi:10.1017/S0036930600033561.
- ——— (1981). "The Vicarious Humanity of Christ". In Torrance, Thomas F. (ed.). The Incarnation, Ecumenical Studies in the Nicene-Constantinopolitan Creed, AD 381. Edinburgh: Handsel Press.
- ——— (1983). "The Incarnation and 'Limited Atonement". The Evangelical Quarterly. 55 (2): 83–94. doi:10.1163/27725472-05502002. S2CID 251997395.
- ——— (July 1987). "Authority, Scripture and Tradition". The Evangelical Quarterly. 59 (3): 245–251. doi:10.1163/27725472-05903005. S2CID 252000347.
- ——— (1991). "The Doctrine of the Trinity in our Contemporary Situation". In Heron, Alasdair (ed.). The Forgotten Trinity: Selection of Papers Presented to the BCC v. 3: Study Commission on Trinitarian Doctrine Today. Churches Together in Britain and Ireland.
- ——— (1996). Introduction. The Nature of the Atonement. By Campbell, John McLeod. Edinburgh: Handsel Press.
