= Thomas F. Torrance =

Scottish Protestant theologian (1913–2007)

The Very Reverend Thomas F. Torrance MBE FRSE FBA
- Born: Thomas Forsyth Torrance; 30 August 1913; Chengdu, Sichuan, Republic of China
- Died: 2 December 2007 (aged 94); Edinburgh, Scotland
- Spouse: Margaret Spear (m. 1946)
- Children: 3
- Father: Thomas Torrance
- Relatives: J. B. Torrance (brother); David W. Torrance (brother); Sir Iain Torrance (son)

Academic background
- Education: University of Edinburgh; University of Oxford; University of Basel

Academic work
- Discipline: Theology
- Influenced: Andrew Purves

Thomas Forsyth Torrance MBE FRSE FBA (30 August 1913 – 2 December 2007), commonly referred to as T. F. Torrance, was a Scottish Protestant theologian and Presbyterian minister. He was a member of the famed Torrance family of theologians. Torrance served for 27 years as a professor of Christian dogmatics at New College, at the University of Edinburgh. He is best known for his pioneering work in the study of science and theology, but he is equally respected for his work in systematic theology.

In addition to writing many of his own books and articles, he also edited the translation of several hundred theological writings into English, including the thirteen-volume, six-million-word Church Dogmatics of Swiss theologian Karl Barth, as well as John Calvin's New Testament Commentaries.

Torrance has been acknowledged as one of the most significant English-speaking theologians of the 20th century. In 1978, he received the Templeton Foundation Prize for Progress in Religion. Torrance remained a dedicated churchman throughout his life, serving as an ordained minister in the Church of Scotland. He was instrumental in the development of the historic agreement between the World Alliance of Reformed Churches and the Eastern Orthodox Church churches on the doctrine of the Trinity, who released a joint statement of agreement on 13 March 1991.

After retiring from the University of Edinburgh in 1979, he continued to lecture and publish extensively, including several influential books on the Trinity: The Trinitarian Faith: The Evangelical Theology of the Ancient Catholic Church (1988); Trinitarian Perspectives: Toward Doctrinal Agreement (1994); and The Christian Doctrine of God, One Being Three Persons (1996).

== Biography ==
=== Education and academic career ===
Thomas Forsyth Torrance was the son of the Revd Thomas Torrance (1871–1959) and Annie Elizabeth Torrance (1883–1981), both Scottish missionaries of China Inland Mission in Chengdu, Sichuan, West China, where he spent the first 13 years of his life. He was named after his great-grandfather, also Thomas Forsyth Torrance.

He began studying in Edinburgh in 1931, focusing on classics and philosophy. At that time his own realist views of philosophy, theology and morality started to take shape. He moved to the study of theology at the Faculty of Divinity (New College) in 1934, and began to question the theological methodology of Schleiermacher for its lack of realist scientific objectivity.

For Torrance, such objectivity meant that theological concepts must be shaped by the unique nature of the object of reflection. In this regard, theology differed from science only in the object being reflected; while science reflects the world, theology reflects the Creator of the world — who was no distant God, but became incarnate within time and space to reconcile the world to himself. Therefore Torrance opposed every form of dualism, because it kept God from interacting with people throughout history. He also opposed subjectivism because he held that it was impossible for people to know God objectively by reflecting upon themselves. Torrance was strongly influenced by Hugh Ross Mackintosh, who stressed the centrality of Christ and the connection between theology and mission; and by Daniel Lamont, who stressed the relationship between Christianity and scientific culture.

Torrance was awarded the Blackie Fellowship in 1936 to study in the Middle East. In Basra, he was accused of being a spy and sentenced to death. However, he was able to convince the authorities that he was a theological student and was allowed to proceed to Baghdad and then Syria. He eventually returned to Scotland and graduated summa cum laude, specialising in systematic theology.

He taught at Auburn Theological Seminary from 1938 to 1939. He was offered a position in religion at Princeton University, which he rejected in order to return home to Scotland before the start of World War II.

From 1939 to 1940, Torrance studied at Oriel College, Oxford, and he was ordained as a minister on 20 March 1940. During the war, he provided pastoral and practical support to Scottish soldiers in North Africa and northern Italy. On more than one occasion, he escaped with his life after coming under fire. After the war, he returned to his parish in Alyth and later became minister at Beechgrove Church in Aberdeen, following in the footsteps of his Hugh Ross Mackintosh, his former professor.

He married Margaret Edith Spear on 2 October 1946 at Combe Down Parish Church near Bath. His children include Thomas Spear Torrance (3 July 1947, now an economist and philosopher of science at Heriot-Watt), Iain Richard Torrance (13 January 1949) and Alison Meta Elizabeth Torrance (15 April 1951, now a general practitioner in Edinburgh).

Also in 1946, he completed his doctorate with Karl Barth in Basel and graduated magna cum laude. His dissertation was titled "The Doctrine of Grace in the Apostolic Fathers". In 1948, he was the founding editor of the peer-reviewed journal the Scottish Journal of Theology, which his son Iain continues to edit along with Bryan Spinks of Yale.

=== Ecumenism ===
As a Reformed churchman and theologian, Torrance worked throughout his career for ecumenical harmony with Anglicans, Lutherans, Eastern Orthodox and Roman Catholics.

He represented the Church of Scotland in conversations with the Church of England from 1949 to 1951, and fought tirelessly for the visible union of the Church; From 1954 to 1962, he was the Convener of the Church of Scotland Commission on Baptism (with John Heron, the father of Alasdair Heron, acting as secretary), and in 1954 he was present at the World Council of Churches meeting in Evanston, Illinois.

Torrance' ecumenical work with the Eastern Orthodox Church was recognised in 1973 when the Archbishop of Axum made him an honorary protopresbyter in the Patriarchate of Alexandria. He served on the Reformed–Roman Catholic Study Commission on the Eucharist which met at Woudschoten in the Netherlands in 1974. At that time, he formed a personal relationship with the Roman Catholic cardinal and renowned ecumenist Yves Congar.

Torrance believed that Karl Rahner's work on the Trinity offered an opportunity for genuine ecumenical convergence between East and West, and between Catholics and Evangelicals. He led a colloquy in Switzerland to discuss Rahner's work in March 1975. He also made significant contributions to Reformed and Roman Catholic discussions of Justification by Faith and by Grace, and there is also much in Torrance's writing that could form the basis for fraternal dialogue between Christians and Jews.

From 1976 to 1977, Torrance served as Moderator of the General Assembly of the Church of Scotland (as did his son Iain from 2003 to 2004). He received an honorary doctorate from Heriot-Watt University in 1983.

== Legacy ==
=== Dogmatic theology ===
One of the reasons that Torrance's theology is now becoming the focus for many doctoral students is that his was a profoundly Christ-centred theology that exhibits no Christomonism (one that reduced all theology to Christology), but instead integrated all Christian doctrine in such a way as to offer sensible and compelling explanations of the Christian faith. This integration of doctrine began for Torrance with the Nicene homoousion (the idea that the eternal Son was and is one in being with the Father and Spirit in eternity and with us by virtue of the incarnation), and included the doctrines of the Trinity, Creation, Incarnation, Atonement, Eschatology, Pneumatology, the church and the sacraments as well as a theology of ordained ministry.

Interpreting each of these doctrines from within the perspective of an ecumenically open doctrine of the Trinity, with which most Roman Catholic and Orthodox theologians would substantially agree, Torrance forged an understanding of Justification by Grace that demonstrated exactly how and why Christ, in his uniqueness as God become man acting from within the human situation marked by sin and evil, overcame sin, suffering, evil and death once and for all both from the divine and the human side. This enabled Torrance to offer a theology that was at once full of depth and meaning and yet joyful and hopeful because he knew that Jesus was no mere moral example of the good life, but God himself who suffered the God-forsakenness associated with human enmity against God on the cross out of unconditional love for humanity, and did so effectively precisely because he was the Word of God incarnate.

He once said that if Jesus was just a man dying on a cross, then Christianity would be immoral, offering a picture of a vindictive God along with the image of a pagan human attempt to appease God through human sacrifice—a form of self-justification. But put God on the cross and the whole picture changes because then the depth of God's costly love could be seen to include the fact that God was not aloof from human suffering but willing himself to experience this suffering in his own Son in order to overcome all that threatens true human existence in fellowship with God. All of this was accomplished and demonstrated in Christ's resurrection and continues to be lived as part of the new creation in the Church, as the community is united through faith and hope with the ascended and advent Lord by the Holy Spirit, through partaking of the Sacraments and through preaching and teaching the Gospel.

=== Theology and science ===
Torrance was awarded the Templeton Foundation Prize for Progress in Religion in 1978. His contributions to the dialogue between science and theology led Alister McGrath to observe that many of those theologians he studied were unfazed by their lack of experience with the method and norms of natural science, but wrote about science nonetheless. In contrast, "Torrance’s writings were, quite simply, of landmark significance." P. Mark Achtemeier describes Torrance's work in this area as "magisterial and highly original." Christopher Kaiser noted that if Einstein was the person of the century from the perspective of the secular media, then Torrance would qualify as the theologian of the century from the perspective of people who are science-minded.

In his groundbreaking book Theological Science, Torrance argued that theology and natural science hold in common the same need to understand reality by pointing beyond the subjectivity that distorts objective reality. Theology and science should then be seen as "allies in a common front where each faces the same insidious enemy, namely, man himself assuming the role of Creator ..." (Torrance, Theological Science, xiii). He contended that, so long as the dialogue is conceived to be between science and religion, "we shall not escape from romantic naturalism." Instead, he insisted that the focus should be on the dialogue between science and theology, and thus between the "philosophy of natural science" and the "philosophy of theological science", because these two methods have in common the "struggle for scientific method on their proper ground and their own distinctive fields" (Torrance, Theological Science, xiii).

Torrance did a great deal to foster this discussion in his books Space, Time and Incarnation and Space, Time and Resurrection where he showed the connections between the two sciences by allowing theology to understand what it means to think of God acting in new and distinctive ways within created time and space, while respecting the distinctive nature of creation itself in its fallen and reconciled condition.

Torrance famously argued for a non-dualist and non-monist view of theology and science in the school of the renowned physicist and theologian John Philoponos (490-570) whose thinking stood in stark contrast to Aristotelian and Neoplatonic thinking which Torrance believed was harmful both to science and to theology. Such thinking led to ideas of God as an unmoved mover, and thus one who was not a living God capable of acting within creation without being conditioned by creation or limited by it.

Torrance approved of Einstein, Maxwell and Polanyi in their attempts to hold together thought and reality, experience and ideas, instead of tearing them apart and believed that theologians could learn from this. Such unitary thinking in science, Torrance believed, could help theologians overcome Kantian and Cartesian dualism. His theology demonstrates exactly how he thought this should be done, especially as this relates to interpreting Scripture. When form and being are separated, as they are when our ideas are separated from objective reality, then it becomes impossible to know Jesus as he is in himself; we only know Jesus as he appeared to be to his followers and this leaves the door open to the idea that Jesus could be created and re-created according to people's faith. This was especially problematic with respect to the risen Lord. When the cord is cut between idea and reality, then it is thought that the resurrection is only a mythological way of reflecting on the death of Jesus instead of as a description of a unique occurrence in his life history that enabled a true understanding of his person and work as recorded in the scriptures.

=== Implications of thought ===
Torrance's scientific theology could be especially helpful today in the debate over whether election constitutes God's triunity or whether the triune God eternally elects us without exhausting his being in his actions for us as Creator, Reconciler and Redeemer. Torrance's thinking, following Barth, clearly comes down against any idea that God's eternal being is constituted by his relations with us in history. And that is precisely one of the factors that makes his thinking so compelling to so many today.

Scholars have noted Torrance’s emphasis on Christ’s continuing high-priestly mediation of humanity to the Father through the Holy Spirit. In his theological work, Torrance argued that there could be no created substitute for Jesus Christ in his risen and ascended existence, and he maintained that Christ, in both his humanity and divinity, continues to unite believers to himself as the Church through faith and grace. His theology has been described as drawing extensively on biblical sources and the writings of the early Church Fathers, and his work has often been discussed in relation to that of his mentor, Karl Barth.

=== Influence ===
- The fact that there is a scholarly society, formed in 2004, the Thomas F. Torrance Theological Fellowship, with a mission to promote serious reflection on the Christian faith following Torrance's own approach to theology, is certainly testimony to the growing importance of his work and extraordinary contributions to the Christian Church and its theology.
- Torrance's thinking has influenced a number of prominent twentieth-century theologians such as Colin E. Gunton (1941-2003), a leading theologian of the Trinity in Great Britain.
- Torrance's thinking about the theology of nature has influenced Alister McGrath's approach to the subject of natural theology.
- Torrance influenced the thinking of some of today's leading Systematic Theologians in Great Britain and on the Continent such as Ivor Davidson of the University of St. Andrews, David A. S. Fergusson of the University of Edinburgh, Alasdair I. C. Heron of the University of Erlangen, Germany, Alan J. Torrance of the University of St. Andrews, Robert T. Walker of the University of Edinburgh and John B. Webster of the University of Aberdeen.
- In the United States, Torrance influenced the theology of Ray S. Anderson (1925-2009), one of his former students, who taught in the area of Theology and Ministry for many years at Fuller Theological Seminary and learned from Torrance to understand theology as a practical science.
- Torrance has influenced many other American and Canadian theologians too numerous to mention here. One indication of this influence is the fact that so many North Americans are engaged in research and doctoral study of Torrance's theology. Also, Torrance's influence can be seen in the thinking of Matthew Baker of Fordham University; Elmer Colyer of the University of Dubuque Theological Seminary, one of the founding Directors of the T. F. Torrance Theological Fellowship and author of a number of works on Torrance; Gary Deddo, Senior Editor at InterVarsity Press and founding President of the T. F. Torrance Theological Fellowship and author of a number of works on Torrance; George Dion Dragas, Professor of Patrology and Patristics, Holy Cross Greek Orthodox School of Theology, Brookline, Massachusetts; Eric Flett of Eastern University, St. David's, Pennsylvania and author of a book on the Theology of Culture as understood through the thinking of Torrance; Michael Gibson of Vanderbilt University; Myk Habets of Carey Baptist College, Auckland, New Zealand, author of a number of works on Torrance, including a book on Torrance and Theosis; George Hunsinger, Hazel Thompson McCord Professor of Systematic Theology at Princeton Theological Seminary and author of a number of works on Torrance as well as an important book on the Eucharist, influenced by Torrance; Christian Kettler of Friends University, Kansas, the current President of the Thomas F. Torrance Theological Fellowship and author of a number of books that demonstrate Torrance's influence; Paul D. Molnar, professor of Systematic Theology at St. John's University in Queens, New York, past President of the Thomas F. Torrance Theological Fellowship and author of a number of works on Torrance including a book on Torrance's trinitarian theology; Andrew Purves, chair in reformed theology at Pittsburgh Theological Seminary; and Joel Scandrett at Trinity Anglican Seminary in Ambridge, Pennsylvania.

== See also ==
- Wolfgang Achtner
- Athanasius the Great
- Karl Barth's Church Dogmatics
- John Calvin
- Yves Congar
- Dogmatic theology
- Ecumenism
- David A.S. Fergusson
- Georges Florovsky
- Colin Gunton
- Daniel Lamont
- Alister McGrath
- Paleo-orthodoxy
- Iain Paul
- John Philoponus
- Michael Polanyi
- Scottish Journal of Theology
- Templeton Foundation Prize for Progress in Religion
- Alan Torrance
- Iain Richard Torrance
- World Alliance of Reformed Churches
- Theological critical realism

== Major works ==
- The Doctrine of Grace in the Apostolic Fathers. Edinburgh: Oliver & Boyd, 1948
- Calvin’s Doctrine of Man. London: Lutterworth Press, 1949.
- Kingdom and Church: A Study in the Theology of the Reformation, Edinburgh: Oliver & Boyd, 1956.
- Coedited with G.W. Bromiley: Karl Barth, Church Dogmatics I/2 The Doctrine of the Word of God. Prolegomena, Part 2, translated by G.T. Thomson and H. Knight. Edinburgh: T&T Clark, 1956.
- Coedited with G.W. Bromiley: Karl Barth, Church Dogmatics IV/1 The Doctrine of Reconciliation, Part I, translated by G.W. Bromiley. Edinburgh: T&T Clark, 1956.
- When Christ Comes and Comes Again. London: Hodder & Stoughton, 1957.
- Coedited with G.W. Bromiley: Karl Barth, Church Dogmatics II/1, The Doctrine of God, translated by T.H.L. Parker, W.B. Johnston, H. Knight and J.L.M. Haire. Edinburgh: T&T Clark, 1957.
- Coedited with G.W. Bromiley: Karl Barth, Church Dogmatics II/2, The Doctrine of God, translated by G.W. Bromiley, J.C. Campbell, I. Wilson, J. Strathern McNab, H. Knight and R.A. Stewart. Edinburgh: T&T Clark, 1957.
- Coedited with G.W. Bromiley: Karl Barth, Church Dogmatics III/1, The Doctrine of Creation, Part 1, translated by J.W. Edwards, O. Bussey and H. Knight. Edinburgh: T&T Clark, 1958.
- Coedited with G.W. Bromiley: Karl Barth, Church Dogmatics IV/2, Part 2, The Doctrine of Reconciliation, translated by G.W. Bromiley. Edinburgh: T&T Clark, 1958.
- Editor, "The Mystery of the Lord's Supper: Sermons by Robert Bruce", Edinburgh: Rutherford House, 1958.
- The Apocalypse Today. Grand Rapids: Eerdmans, 1959.
- Conflict and Agreement in the Church, I: Order and Disorder. London: Lutterworth Press, 1959.
- Coedited with G.W. Bromiley: Karl Barth, Church Dogmatics III/2. The Doctrine of Creation, Part 2, Translated by H. Knight, J.K.S. Reid, G.W. Bromiley and R.H. Fuller. Edinburgh, T&T Clark, 1960.
- Coedited with G.W. Bromiley: Karl Barth, Church Dogmatics III/3. The Doctrine of Creation, Part 3, Translated by G.W. Bromiley and R. Ehrlich. Edinburgh, T&T Clark, 1960.
- "Justification: Its Radical Nature and Place in Reformed Doctrine and Life," SJT 13 (1960) 240.
- Conflict and Agreement in the Church, II: The Ministry and Sacraments of the Gospel. London: Lutterworth Press, 1960.
- Karl Barth: an Introduction to his Early Theology, 1910-1931. London: SCM Press; New York: Harper & Row, 1962.
- "Scientific Hermeneutics according to St. Thomas Aquinas." The Journal of Theological Studies XIII.2 (October, 1962): 259–89.
- Coedited with D.W. Torrance, Calvin's Commentaries, The Second Epistle of Paul the Apostle to the Corinthians, translated by T.A. Smail. Edinburgh: Oliver & Boyd; Grand Rapids, MI: Eerdmans, 1964.
- Theology in Reconstruction. London: SCM Press Ltd, 1965.
- Coedited with D.W. Torrance, Calvin's Commentaries, The Epistles of Paul the Apostle to the Galatians, Ephesians, Philippians and Colossians, translated by T.H.L Parker. Edinburgh: Oliver & Boyd; Grand Rapids, MI: Eerdmans, 1965.
- Coedited with D.W. Torrance, Calvin's Commentaries, The Acts of the Apostles 14-26, translated by J.W. Fraser. Edinburgh: Oliver & Boyd; Grand Rapids, MI: Eerdmans, 1966.
- Coedited with D.W. Torrance, Calvin's Commentaries, A Harmony of the Gospels: Matthew, Mark and Luke, 3 vols. Vols 1 and 3 translated by A.W. Morrison and vol. 2 translated by T.H.L. Parker. Edinburgh: Saint Andrew Press, 1972; Grand Rapids, MI: Eerdmans, 1968.
- Space, Time and Incarnation. London: Oxford University Press, 1969
- Theological Science. London: Oxford University Press, 1969.
- "The Problem of Natural Theology in the Thought of Karl Barth." Religious Studies 6 (1970): 121–35.
- God and Rationality. London: Oxford University Press, 1971.
- "The Relation of the Incarnation to Space in Nicene Theology," The Ecumenical World of Orthodox Civilization: Russia and Orthodoxy. vol. 3. (Essays in Honor of Georges Florovsky) ed. Andrew Blane. Paris: Mouton, 1974.
- Theology in Reconciliation: Essays towards Evangelical and Catholic Unity in East and West. London: Geoffrey Chapman, 1975.
- "Toward Ecumenical Consensus on the Trinity," Theologische Zeitschrift 31 (1975) 337–50.
- Space, Time and Resurrection. Edinburgh: Handsel Press, 1976
- The Ground and Grammar of Theology. Charlottesville: The University Press of Virginia, 1980.
- Christian Theology and Scientific Culture, vol. 1 of series, Theology and Scientific Culture, edited with general foreword by Torrance. New Edition. Belfast: Christian Journals; New York: Oxford University Press, 1981
- Divine and Contingent Order. Oxford and New York: Oxford University Press, 1981.
- The Incarnation: Ecumenical Studies in the Nicene-Constantinopolitan Creed. Edinburgh: The Handsel Press, 1981.
- Reality and Evangelical Theology. Philadelphia: The Westminster Press, 1982.
- A Dynamical Theory of the Electromagnetic Field, James Clerk Maxwell, edited by Torrance, Scottish Academic Press, February 1983, ISBN 0-7073-0324-9
- "The Deposit of Faith." The Scottish Journal of Theology 36.1 (1983): 1-28.
- Transformation & Convergence in the Frame of Knowledge: Explorations in the Interrelations of Scientific and Theological Enterprise. Belfast: Christian Journals; Grand Rapids, MI: William B. Eerdmans, 1984.
- The Christian Frame of Mind. Edinburgh: Handsel Press, 1985
- Reality and Scientific Theology. The Margaret Harris Lectures, Dundee, 1970 (Theology and Science at the Frontiers of Knowledge, vol 1). Edinburgh: Scottish University Press, 1985
- "My Interaction with Karl Barth." In How Karl Barth Changed My Mind, edited by Donald K. McKim, 52–64. Grand Rapids, Michigan: William B. Eerdmans, 1986.
- "Karl Barth and Patristic Theology," in Theology Beyond Christendom: Essays on the Centenary of the Birth of Karl Barth May 10, 1986. ed. John Thompson. Allison Park, PA: Pickwich, 1986, 215–39.
- "Theological Realism." In The Philosophical Frontiers of Christian Theology: Essays Presented to D. M. MacKinnon. Cambridge: Cambridge University Press, 1982, 169–96.
- The Hermeneutics of John Calvin. Edinburgh: Scottish Academic Press, 1988.
- The Trinitarian Faith: The Evangelical Theology of the Ancient Catholic Church. Edinburgh: T & T Clark, 1988.
- Karl Barth, Biblical and Evangelical Theologian. Edinburgh: T & T Clark, 1990.
- The Mediation of Christ. Colorado Springs: Helmers & Howard, 1992.
- Royal Priesthood: A Theology of Ordained Ministry. Edinburgh: T & T Clark, 1993.
- Ed. Theological Dialogue Between Orthodox and Reformed Churches, 2 Vols. Edinburgh: Scottish Academic Press, 1985–1993.
- Trinitarian Perspectives: Toward Doctrinal Agreement. Edinburgh: T & T Clark, 1994.
- Preaching Christ Today: The Gospel and Scientific Thinking. Grand Rapids, MI: Eerdmans, 1994.
- Divine Meaning: Studies in Patristic Hermeneutics. Edinburgh: T & T Clark, 1995.
- "The Uniqueness of Divine Revelation and the Authority of the Scriptures: The Creed Associations's Statement." Scottish Bulletin of Evangelical Theology 13 (Aut. 1995): 97-101.
- The Christian Doctrine of God, One Being Three Persons. Edinburgh: T & T Clark, 1996.
- Kingdom and Church: A Study in the Theology of the Reformation. Eugene, Oregon: Wipf and Stock, 1996.
- Scottish Theology: From John Knox to John McLeod Campbell. Edinburgh: T & T Clark, 1996.
- Theological and Natural Science. Eugene, Oregon: Wipf and Stock, 2002.
- The Doctrine of Jesus Christ. Eugene Oregon: Wipf and Stock Publishers, 2002.
- Incarnation: The Person and Life of Christ. Edited by Robert T. Walker. Downers Grove, Illinois: InterVarsity Press, 2008.
- Atonement: The Person and Work of Christ. Edited by Robert T. Walker. Downers Grove, Illinois: InterVarsity Press, 2009.
