= George Newlands =

Scottish theologian

George McLeod Newlands FRSE is a Scottish theologian widely published in the fields of modern systematic theology, Christology, emancipatory theology, and the history of Christian thought. He is Emeritus Professor of Divinity at the University of Glasgow, and served as Chair of the Theology, Divinity & Religious Studies panel of the UK's 2008 Research Assessment Exercise and as President of the Society for the Study of Theology for 2013–14.

== Career ==
Newlands held the 1577/1640 Chair of Divinity at the University of Glasgow from 1986 to 2008. He was previously a University Lecturer at the University of Cambridge and Dean of Trinity Hall. He is now an Honorary Professorial Research Fellow at the University of Glasgow and an Honorary Fellow of New College, University of Edinburgh.

Newlands was Dean of Glasgow's Faculty of Divinity from 1988 to 1990, Head of the Department of Theology and Church History from 1986 to 1992, and Director of the Centre for Literature, Theology and the Arts] from 1998 to 2002. He was appointed by the General Assembly of the Church of Scotland to be Principal of Trinity College, Glasgow, the Church's college within the Faculty of Divinity, from 1991 to 1997 and again from 2001 to 2007.

Newlands was educated at the University of Edinburgh (MA, BD, DLitt), and gained a PhD in Theology in 1970; Heidelberg (from where he travelled to attend the final seminar of Karl Barth in Basel); Paris; Zurich; and Churchill College, Cambridge (MA).

== Theology ==
Newlands is best known for his work interpreting the love of God, particularly a Christology of divine love. In Hilary of Poitiers: a Study in Theological Method (1978), Newlands argues for concepts of love as the key to exegesis in theology. In Theology of the Love of God (1980), Newlands takes concepts of the love of God to be the basic structuring element of Christian theology. Newlands engages interpretations of love in the Christian tradition and contemporary uses of concepts of faith, hope, and history, and proposes that the nature of God as love shapes every aspect of theology. In God in Christian Perspective (1994), Newlands's argument is developed further. An understanding of God as a multi-faceted model draws on Christology and Trinity, and faith and practice in community. God is personal, self-differentiated being, transcendent, yet also immanent in the created order as hidden divine presence. The core elements of theology (faith and revelation, divine action and Christology) are reappraised in the light of current theological proposals. Doctrines, Newlands argues, interact in a web of connection to shape Christian practice. A Christian understanding, however, must retain a basic core of unconditional love, Christologically characterised. A contemporary concept of God draws upon these core elements, and upon a retrieval of the historical traditions from which they arise. It can be articulated in language intelligible to contemporary citizens, and its consequences spelled out within the complexity of contemporary cultures. Generosity and the Christian Future (1997) carries this thesis to a further stage through engagement with emancipatory theologies, postmodernity, and political theory. John and Donald Baillie: Transatlantic Theology (2002), built on first access to the Baillie Papers, lies at the heart of Newlands's constructive proposal. Newlands takes the work of John Baillie and Donald Ballie as seminal to the understanding, justification and revisioning of a progressive Christian theology. This tradition is a trajectory against the stream of contemporary theology. In The Transformative Imagination: Rethinking Intercultural Theology (2004), Newlands offers a comparative study of connections between theology and culture, through the arts, the sciences, political and human rights issues, and shapes reflection on the mystery of God in a postfoundational frame.

Newlands is also a pioneer in his theological treatments of human rights, published as Christ and Human Rights (2006), Faith and Human Rights (2008), and Hospitable God (2010). He has also written on Christian ethics (Making Christian Decisions, 1985) and ecclesiology (The Church of God, 1984).

== Ecclesiastical work ==
Newlands is probably unique in being both an ordained Minister of the Church of Scotland and a priest in the Church of England. He is a past convenor of the General Assembly of the Church of Scotland's Panel on Doctrine and has served on the Doctrine Commission of the Church of England, and the Doctrine Committee of the Scottish Episcopal Church.

In May 2006, Newlands was involved in the creation of Affirmation Scotland a group within the Church of Scotland seeking "to affirm and celebrate Christ's call for inclusion, generosity and hospitality, and to see the full affirmation of all Christians, progressive and traditional, straight, gay and lesbian, within the Church of Scotland". He is also associated with OneKirk, a network "committed to working for an inclusive, affirming and progressive church". Both of these bodies came in the wake of controversies within the Church of Scotland regarding the blessing of civil partnerships for gay and lesbian people.

== Selected publications ==
=== Monographs ===
- Christ and Human Rights, 2006.
- The Transformative Imagination: Rethinking Intercultural Theology, 2004.
- John and Donald Baillie: Transatlantic Theology, 2002.
- Generosity and the Christian Future, 1997. (The Henson Lectures for 1995.)
- God in Christian Perspective, 1994.
- Making Christian Decisions, 1985.
- The Church of God, 1984.
- Theology of the Love of God, 1980.
- Hilary of Poitiers: A Study in Theological Method, 1978.

=== Edited and Cowritten Work ===
- Hospitable God (with Allen Smith), 2010.
- Faith and Human Rights (with Richard Amesbury), 2008.
- Believing in the Text (edited by Newlands and David Jasper), 2004.
- Fifty Key Christian Thinkers (with Peter McEnhill), 2002.
- Scottish Christianity in the Modern World (edited by Newlands and Stewart Brown), 2001.
- Explorations in Theology 8 (G.W.H. Lampe, edited by Newlands), 1981.

=== Collected Papers ===
- Spirit of Liberality, 2014.
- Traces of Liberality, 2006.

=== Festschrift ===
- The God of Love and Human Dignity (edited by Paul Middleton), presented 2007.

== See also ==
- List of Professorships at the University of Glasgow
- Professor of Divinity, Glasgow
- Trinity Hall, Cambridge
- Trinity College, Glasgow
- University of Glasgow
