= Scottish Academic Press =

Edinburgh-based publisher

Scottish Academic Press is a Scottish publishing company. It is based in Edinburgh on Brandfield Street.
