= Hank Worden =

American actor (1901-1992)

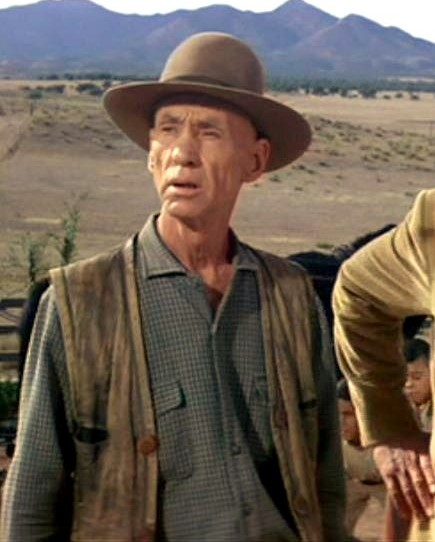
- Worden in McLintock! (1963)
- Born: Norton Earl Worden; July 23, 1901; Rolfe, Iowa, U.S.
- Died: December 6, 1992 (aged 91); Los Angeles, California, U.S.
- Resting place: Forest Lawn Memorial Park, Glendale, California
- Education: Stanford University; University of Nevada
- Occupation: Actor
- Years active: 1935–1991
- Spouse: Emma Louise Eaton (m. 1940; died 1977)
- Children: 1

Hank Worden (born Norton Earl Worden; July 23, 1901 – December 6, 1992) was an American cowboy-turned-character actor who appeared in many Westerns, including a dozen John Ford films, such as The Searchers, and the TV series The Lone Ranger.

== Biography ==
Norton Earl Worden was born on July 23, 1901, in Rolfe, Iowa, and raised on a cattle ranch near Glendive, Montana. He was educated as an engineer at Stanford University and the University of Nevada. He enlisted in the U.S. Army, hoping to become an Army Air Force aviator, but failed to pass flight school. An expert horseman, he toured the country in rodeos as a saddle bronc rider. During one ride, his horse landed atop him and fractured his neck, but aside from a temporary soreness, Worden did not know the severity of the damage until X-rayed 20 years later. While participating in a rodeo at Madison Square Garden in New York City, fellow cowboy Tex Ritter and he were chosen to appear in the Broadway play Green Grow the Lilacs (1931). Following the run of the play, Worden drove a cab in the city, and then worked on dude ranches as a wrangler and as a guide on the Bright Angel Trail of the Grand Canyon.

A chance encounter with actress Billie Burke at a dude ranch led her to recommend him to several film producers. Worden made his film debut as an extra in Cecil B. DeMille's The Plainsman (though a few later films were released prior to The Plainsman). By this time, Tex Ritter had become a star, and Worden played sidekick roles in a number of Ritter's Westerns. In several of his early appearances, Worden was billed as "Heber Snow", until he reverted to his real name. A small part in Howard Hawks's Come and Get It led to a number of later appearances for that director, who also recommended him to director John Ford.

Worden eventually became a member of the John Ford Stock Company and was directed by Ford 12 times in films and television. The connection with Ford led to an association with actor John Wayne, and Worden appeared in 17 of Wayne's films. Foremost among his collaborations with Wayne and Ford in The Searchers, the 1956 iconic Western in which Worden portrayed his most memorable role, that of Mose Harper, the Shakespearean fool who only longed for "a roof over [his] head and a rocking chair by the fire."

Worden worked steadily in television and film, appearing in six episodes of the TV series The Lone Ranger and as a senile hotel waiter in David Lynch's Twin Peaks TV series.

In 1992, Worden hosted and co-produced with director Clyde Lucas an independent special shown on the Nostalgia Channel and some PBS stations entitled Thank Ya, Thank Ya Kindly. The special looked back on Worden's career and featured guests Clint Eastwood, Paul Hogan, Harry Carey Jr., Ben Johnson, Frankie Avalon, Burt Kennedy, and stuntman Dean Smith.

Widowed by his wife of 37 years, the former Emma Louise Eaton, in 1977, he later shared his house for several years with actor Jim Beaver. He died while taking a nap at his home in Los Angeles on December 6, 1992, aged 91. He was survived by his daughter, Dawn Henry, whom his wife and he had adopted as an adult.

== Selected filmography ==
=== John Wayne films ===
- Stagecoach (1939) as Cavalryman extra (uncredited)
- The Night Riders (1939) as Rancher (uncredited)
- A Lady Takes a Chance (1943) as Walter (uncredited)
- Angel and the Badman (1947) as Townsman (uncredited)
- Fort Apache (1948) as Southern Recruit
- Red River (1948) as Sims Reeves
- 3 Godfathers (1948) as Deputy Curly
- The Fighting Kentuckian (1949) as Abner Todd (uncredited)
- The Quiet Man (1952) as Trainer in flashback (uncredited)
- The Searchers (1956) as Mose Harper
- The Horse Soldiers (1959) as Deacon Clump
- The Alamo (1960) as Parson
- McLintock! (1963) as Curly Fletcher
- True Grit (1969) as R. Ryan - Undertaker (uncredited)
- Chisum (1970) as Elwood - Stationmaster
- Rio Lobo (1970) as Hank - Hotel Clerk (uncredited)
- Big Jake (1971) as Hank
- Cahill U.S. Marshal (1973) as Albert

=== Other appearances ===
- Barbary Coast (1935) as Barfly / Townsman (uncredited)
- For the Service (1936) as Henchman (uncredited)
- Ghost-Town Gold (1936) as Mr. Crabtree (uncredited)
- Come and Get It (1936) as Lumberjack (uncredited)
- The Plainsman (1936) as Deadwood Townsman (uncredited)
- Trouble in Texas (1937) as Hank a Dancer (uncredited)
- Hittin' the Trail (1937) as Sidekick Hank
- Sing, Cowboy, Sing (1937) as Henchman
- Riders of the Rockie (1937) as Henchman (uncredited)
- Riders of the Dawn (1937) as Deputy (uncredited)
- The Californian (1937) as Ruiz Man (uncredited)
- The Mystery of the Hooded Horsemen (1937) as Deputy
- Moonlight on the Range (1937) as Ranch Hand (uncredited)
- Hollywood Round-Up (1937) as Saloon Set Extra (uncredited)
- Boss of Lonely Valley (1937) as Hank - Wagon Driver (uncredited)
- Tex Rides with the Boy Scouts (1937) as Henchman (uncredited)
- Sudden Bill Dorn (1937) as Barfly (uncredited)
- The Singing Outlaw (1937) as Bixby Cowhand (uncredited)
- Frontier Town (1938) as Henchman Buck (uncredited)
- The Last Stand (1938) as Rustler Playing Fiddle at Campfire (uncredited)
- Western Trails (1938) as Townsman (uncredited)
- Flaming Frontiers (1938) as Henchman [Ch. 11] (uncredited)
- Rollin' Plains (1938) as Henchman Squint (uncredited)
- The Stranger from Arizona (1938) as Skeeter
- Where the Buffalo Roam (1938) as Man at Dance (uncredited)
- The Cowboy and the Lady (1938) as Cowhand Leonard (uncredited)
- Ghost Town Riders (1938) as Tom 'Cherokee' Walton
- Sundown on the Prairie (1939) as Henchman Hank
- Rollin' Westward (1939) as Slim Regan
- Timber Stampede (1939) as Photographer (uncredited)
- Oklahoma Frontier (1939) as Townsman (uncredited)
- Chip of the Flying U (1939) as Cowhand (uncredited)
- Reno (1939) as Townsman (uncredited)
- Northwest Passage (1940) as Ranger Tying Oars (uncredited)
- Viva Cisco Kid (1940) as Deputy (uncredited)
- Rancho Grande (1940) as Cowhand (uncredited)
- Riders of Pasco Basin (1940) as Townsman (uncredited)
- Shooting High (1940) as Townsman (uncredited)
- Beyond Tomorrow (1940) as Hospital Visitor (uncredited)
- Gaucho Serenade (1940) as Farmer Driving Jalopy (uncredited)
- Prairie Law (1940) as Jacobs - Homesteader (uncredited)
- Winners of the West (1940) as Drunk [Chs. 3, 5] (uncredited)
- Cross-Country Romance (1940) as Wedding Witness (uncredited)
- The Range Busters (1940) as Cowhand (uncredited)
- Brigham Young (1940) as Mormon Cheering Porter (uncredited)
- Ride, Tenderfoot, Ride (1940) as Henry Haggerty (uncredited)
- Triple Justice (1940) as Townsman Outside Saloon (uncredited)
- Ride, Kelly, Ride (1941) as Slim (uncredited)
- Robbers of the Range (1941) as Stagecoach Attendant (uncredited)
- Border Vigilantes (1941) as Aunt Jennifer's Wagon Driver (uncredited)
- Last of the Duanes (1941) as Loafer (uncredited)
- Dude Cowboy (1941) as Man with Toothache (uncredited)
- Code of the Outlaw (1942) as Expectant Father (uncredited)
- Cowboy Serenade (1942) as Opie (uncredited)
- Riding the Wind (1942) as Duff Bricker
- Just Off Broadway (1942) as Comedian in Wings (uncredited)
- Deep in the Heart of Texas (1942) as Townsman (uncredited)
- Tenting Tonight on the Old Camp Ground (1943) as Sleepy Martin
- Black Market Rustlers (1943) as Slim
- So Proudly We Hail! (1943) as Soldier on Troop Ship (uncredited)
- Flesh and Fantasy (1943) as Circus Spectator (uncredited)
- Jack London (1943) as New Year's Eve Party Guest (uncredited)
- Canyon City (1943) as Barfly (uncredited)
- The Woman of the Town (1943) as The Barber (uncredited)
- None Shall Escape (1944) as German Motorcycle Soldier (uncredited)
- Rationing (1944) as Man at Wedding (uncredited)
- Wyoming Hurricane (1944) as Cowboy (uncredited)
- Lumberjack (1944) as Lumberjack (uncredited)
- The Great Moment (1944) as Morton's Sign Painter - replaced Roscoe Ates (uncredited)
- National Barn Dance (1944) as Farmer at Barn Dance (uncredited)
- The Bullfighters (1945) as Mr. McCoy (uncredited)
- Abbott and Costello in Hollywood (1945) as Joe (uncredited)
- Frontier Gunlaw (1946) as Pete (uncredited)
- Lawless Breed (1946) as The Deputy
- The Missing Lady (1946) as Flophouse Bum (uncredited)
- Undercurrent (1946) as Telegram Delivery Man (uncredited)
- Duel in the Sun (1946) as Dance- Floor Cowboy (uncredited)
- The Shocking Miss Pilgrim (1947) as Office Clerk (uncredited)
- The Sea of Grass (1947) as Bill - Salt Fork Townsman (uncredited)
- The Secret Life of Walter Mitty (1947) as Minor Role (uncredited)
- Prairie Express (1947) as Deputy Clint
- High Wall (1947) as Diner Customer (uncredited)
- Slippy McGee (1948) as Station Wagon Driver (uncredited)
- The Man from Texas (1948) as Churchgoer (uncredited)
- Lightnin' in the Forest (1948) as Bartender
- The Sainted Sisters (1948) as Taub Beasley
- Hazard (1948) as Man in Cheap Hotel (uncredited)
- Feudin', Fussin' and A-Fightin' (1948) as Clem (uncredited)
- Tap Roots (1948) as Cropper (uncredited)
- Whispering Smith (1948) as Murray's Ranchhand (uncredited)
- Yellow Sky (1948) as Rancher, Bank Customer (uncredited)
- Cover Up (1949) as Undertaker (credited as "Worden Norten"]
- Red Canyon (1949) as Charley (uncredited)
- Streets of Laredo (1949) as Texas Ranger (uncredited)
- Hellfire (1949) as Witness (uncredited)
- Roseanna McCoy (1949) as Jacob (uncredited)
- When Willie Comes Marching Home (1950) as American Legionnaire Band Leader (uncredited)
- Father Is a Bachelor (1950) as Finnegan (uncredited)
- Wagon Master (1950) as Luke Clegg
- Curtain Call at Cactus Creek (1950) as Townsman
- Frenchie (1950) as Mr. Grady (uncredited)
- Sugarfoot (1951) as Johnny-Behind-the-Stove
- Comin' Round the Mountain (1951) as Target Judge
- Joe Palooka in Triple Cross (1951) as Hard-of-Hearing Farmer
- The Man with a Cloak (1951) as First Carriage Driver (uncredited)
- Boots Malone (1952) as Gas Station Mechanic (uncredited)
- Woman of the North Country (1952) as Tom Gordon
- The Big Sky (1952) as Poordevil
- Apache War Smoke (1952) as Amber
- Sky Full of Moon (1952) as Cowhand (uncredited)
- The Lawless Breed (1953) as Kansas City Barfly (uncredited)
- Ma and Pa Kettle on Vacation (1953) (uncredited)
- Powder River (1953) as Joe (uncredited)
- Crime Wave (1953) as Sweeney (uncredited)
- Ma and Pa Kettle at Home (1954) as Indian (uncredited)
- The Outcast (1954) as Bartender (uncredited)
- Davy Crockett, King of the Wild Frontier (1955) as Cave bar patron (uncredited)
- The Road to Denver (1955) as Shad Ewing, Livery Stable Owner (uncredited)
- The Vanishing American (1955) as Shoie (uncredited)
- The Indian Fighter (1955) as Crazy Bear / Guardhouse Keeper
- Davy Crockett and the River Pirates (1956) as Fiddler (archive footage)
- Meet Me in Las Vegas (1956) as Joe (uncredited)
- Thunder Over Arizona (1956) as Old Jonas (uncredited)
- Accused of Murder (1956) as Les Fuller
- The Quiet Gun (1957) as Sampson
- Spoilers of the Forest (1957) as Pat Casey
- Dragoon Wells Massacre (1957) as Hopi Charlie
- The Buckskin Lady (1957) as Lon
- Forty Guns (1957) as Marshal John Chisum
- Sing, Boy, Sing (1958) as Girl's Father at Police Station (uncredited)
- The Notorious Mr. Monks (1958) as Pete
- Toughest Gun in Tombstone (1958) as Liveryman (uncredited)
- Bullwhip (1958) as Tex
- Wild Heritage (1958) as Trail Drive Cowhand (uncredited)
- Sergeant Rutledge (1960) as Laredo (uncredited)
- One-Eyed Jacks (1961) as Doc
- The Music Man (1962) as Undertaker (uncredited)
- Good Times (1967) as Kid
- The President's Analyst (1967) as Dirty Old Man (uncredited)
- Big Daddy (1969)
- Zachariah (1971) as Old Cowboy (uncredited)
- Bedknobs and Broomsticks (1971) as Old Home Guardsman (uncredited)
- Black Noon (1971, TV Movie) as Joseph
- Eve of Aunt Agnes (1974)
- The Hanged Man (1974, TV Movie) as Ab Wickes
- The Legend of Frank Woods (1977) as Slim
- Smokey and the Bandit (1977) as Trucker with harmonica (uncredited)
- Which Way Is Up? (1977) as The Flunky
- Big Wednesday (1978) as Shopping Cart
- Sgt. Pepper's Lonely Hearts Club Band (1978) as Old Lonely Hearts Club Band
- They Went That-A-Way & That-A-Way (1978) as Butch Collins
- Every Which Way but Loose (1978) as Trailer Court Manager
- Bronco Billy (1980) as Station Mechanic
- Scream (1981) as John
- Soggy Bottom, U.S.A. (1981) as Old Geezer
- Hammett (1982) as Pool Room Attendant
- Flush (1982)
- Island Fury (1983) as Gramps Jebediah
- The Ice Pirates (1984) as Elderly Jason
- UFOria (1985) as Colonel
- Runaway Train (1985) as Old Con
- Space Rage (1985) as Old codger
- Once Upon a Texas Train (1988, TV Movie) as Old Timer
- Big Bad John (1990) as Good Ole Boy
- Almost an Angel (1990) as Pop, Patient in Hospital

=== Television ===
- The Lone Ranger - episode - The Tenderfeet (1949) as Rusty Bates
- The Lone Ranger - episode - Woman from Omaha (1953) as Whip
- The Lone Ranger - episode - The Ghost of Coyote Canyon (1953) as Ed
- The Lone Ranger - episode - Stage to Tishomingo (1954) as Ike Beatty, Stage driver
- The Lone Ranger - episode - The Bait: Gold! (1955) as Jud, Stagecoach Driver
- The Lone Ranger - episode - The Banker's Son (1957) as Bruckner
- Rawhide - episode - Incident of the Devil and His Due (1960) as Joe Wendell
- Wagon Train - episode - The Colter Craven Story (1960) as Hank (uncredited)
- Wagon Train - episode - The Nellie Jefferson Story (1961) as Trader
- Bonanza - episode - The Stranger (1960) as Station Attendant
- Bonanza - episode - The Bride (1961) as Ned Birch (Old Miner)
- Bonanza - episode - Tommy (1966) as Dave (uncredited)
- Hondo and the Apaches - TV movie (1967) as One of Gallagher's Mine Workers (uncredited)
- Hondo - episode - Hondo and the Eagle Claw (1967) as Miner (uncredited)
- Hondo - episode - Hondo and the War Cry (1967) as Miner (uncredited)
- McCloud - episode - A Little Plot at Tranquil Valley (1972) as Elderly Patient (uncredited)
- Gunsmoke - episode - The Tarnished Bridge (1974) as Claude
- The Yellow Rose - episode - A Question of Love (1983) as Old Man
- Knight Rider - episode - Fright Knight (1985) as Slim
- Twin Peaks (1990-1991) as Waiter (Final Role)
