= Murdock MacQuarrie =

American actor (1877–1942)

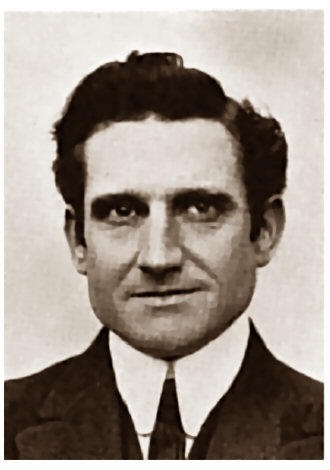
- Who's Who in the Film World, 1914
- Born: August 25, 1877; San Francisco, California, U.S.
- Died: August 20, 1942 (aged 63); Los Angeles, California, U.S.
- Occupation: Actor
- Years active: 1912–1942
- Relatives: Albert MacQuarrie (brother); Frank MacQuarrie (brother); George MacQuarrie (brother)

Murdock MacQuarrie (August 25, 1877 – August 20, 1942) was an American silent film actor and director. His name was also seen as Murdock McQuarrie.

MacQuarrie was born in San Francisco, California, and attended school there. He had five brothers who acted on stage, perhaps including Albert MacQuarrie, Frank MacQuarrie, and George MacQuarrie.

MacQuarrie acted on stage for 28 years.

After acting on stage, MacQuarrie began acting in films in 1902 with Biograph. Around 1912-1913, he was acting for the Kinemacolor Company of America. His film work included The Count of Monte Cristo (1913), before becoming a director at Universal. He is perhaps best-remembered by modern audiences as J. Widdecombe Billows, the eccentric inventor of the eating machine, in Charlie Chaplin's Modern Times (1936).

In the 1910s, MacQuarrie directed at Universal, and in the early 1920s he returned to acting.

He diversified his activities in 1919, joining his wife in her real-estate business in Hollywood.

On August 20, 1942, MacQuarrie died in Los Angeles, California, aged 63.

== Filmography ==
=== Actor ===
==== 1910s ====
- The Hand of Mystery (1912, Short)
- The Ways of Fate (1913, Short)
- The Scarlet Letter (1913, Short) .... Roger Chillingworth
- Mission Bells (1913, Short)
- Mother (1913, Short)
- The Trap (1913, Short) .... Chance
- The Echo of a Song (1913, Short) .... A modern fagin
- Criminals (1913, Short) .... Richard Wainwright / John Dick
- The Thumb Print (1913, Short) .... The Cook (credited as Malcolm J. MacQuarrie)
- When Death United (1913, Short) .... (credited as Malcolm MacQuarrie)
- The Count of Monte Cristo (1913) .... Danglars
- The Boob's Dream Girl (1913, Short) .... Count Alberti (credited as Malcolm MacQuarrie)
- Red Margaret, Moonshiner (1913, Short) .... Government Agent
- Bloodhounds of the North (1913, Short) .... Mountie
- The Lie (1914, Short) .... Auld MacGregor
- The Honor of the Mounted (1914, Short) .... Mountie
- Remember Mary Magdalen (1914, Short) .... The Minister
- Discord and Harmony (1914, Short) .... The Composer
- The Menace to Carlotta (1914, Short) .... Tony's Father
- The Embezzler (1914, Short) .... John Spencer
- The Lamb, the Woman, the Wolf (1914, Short) .... The Lamb
- The End of the Feud (1914, Short) .... Hen Dawson
- The Tragedy of Whispering Creek (1914, Short) .... The Stranger
- The Unlawful Trade (1914, Short) .... The Revenue Man
- Heart Strings (1914, Short)
- The Forbidden Room (1914, Short) .... Dr. Gibson
- The Old Cobbler (1914, Short) .... The Cobbler
- The Hopes of Blind Alley (1914, Short) .... Jean Basse
- A Ranch Romance (1914, Short) .... Jack Deering
- Her Grave Mistake (1914, Short) .... Roger Grant
- By the Sun's Rays (1914, Short) .... John Murdock
- The Oubliette (1914, Short) .... François Villon
- A Miner's Romance (1914, Short) .... Bob Jenkins
- The Higher Law (1914, Short) .... François Villon
- Be Neutral (1914, Short)
- Richelieu (1914) .... Cardinal Richelieu
- The Old Bell-Ringer (1914, Short) .... Thomas Drake - the Old Organist
- Monsieur Bluebeard (1914, Short) .... François Villon
- The Nihilists (1914, Short) .... Thomas Madison - Prosecuting Attorney
- The Wall of Flame (1914, Short) .... Old Fenton - the Father
- The Star Gazer (1914, Short) .... The Old Astronomer
- Two Thieves (1914, Short) .... The Burglar
- Ninety Black Boxes (1914, Short) .... François Villon
- As We Journey Through Life (1914, Short) .... Old Uncle Eli
- The Foundlings of Father Time (1914, Short) .... Daddy Ross - the Aged Husband
- The Widow's Last (1914, Short) .... The Old Shoemaker
- The Christmas Spirit (1914, Short) .... Harry the Hobo
- For I Have Toiled (1914, Short) .... Hiram Marshall
- When It's One of Your Own (1914, Short) .... Heinrich Gerhardt
- His Last Performance (1915, Short) .... Old Doc Jackson
- The Clutch of the Emperor (1915, Short)
- The Useless One (1915, Short)
- A Small Town Girl (1915, Short) .... The Snob's Father
- The Dear Old Hypocrite (1915, Short) .... Wealthy Uncle George
- Alias Mr. Smith (1915, Short) .... Frank Wilson alias Mr. Smith
- Seven and Seventy (1915, Short) .... Captain John Brent
- Dad (1915, Short) .... Dad
- An Example (1915, Short) .... Ex-Sheriff Joseph Bohn
- The Prayer of a Horse or: His Life Story Told by Himself (1915, Short) .... Tom Collins
- Wheels Within Wheels (1915, Short) .... Von Ludwig
- The Truth About Dan Deering (1915, Short) .... Dan Deering
- At His Own Terms (1915, Short) .... John Marsh - Backwoodsman
- Number 239 (1915, Short) .... John Anders
- The Cameo Ring (1915, Short) .... John Brown
- Putting One Over (1915, Short) .... Bad Louis
- The Old Tutor (1915, Short) .... The Old Tutor
- The Troubadour (1915, Short) .... Joe Trinidad - the Troubadour
- The Fear Within (1915, Short) .... Brother Gregoire
- The Faith of Her Fathers (1915, Short) .... Rabbi Tamor
- The Stronger Mind (1915, Short) .... A Crook
- Where Brains Are Needed (1915, Short) .... Old Tom Sharpleigh - the Detective
- The Old Doctor (1915, Short) .... Old Doctor Jones
- The Swinging Doors (1915, Short) .... Jean Dumont
- In His Mind's Eye (1915, Short) .... Peter von Helm - Blind Beggar
- The Tinker of Stubbenville (1915, Short) .... Will Harvey - the Tinkerof Stubbinville
- The Old Grouch (1915, Short) .... John Agnew
- The Closing Chapter (1915, Short) .... Hamilton Walker - the Grandfather
- Mein Friendt Schneider (1915, Short) .... David Hoffman - the Pawnbroker (as Murdock McQuarrie)
- His Beloved Violin (1915, Short) .... Von Wagner
- Ethel's Burglar (1915, Short) .... Norton - the Burglar
- The Mystery of the Tapestry Room (1915, Short) .... Tom Sharpleigh - Detective
- The Tam o' Shanter (1915, Short) .... Tam O' Shanter
- The Finest Gold (1915, Short) .... Scrooge McQuoil
- The Sheriff of Red Rock Gulch (1915, Short) .... Bill Borden
- The $50,000 Jewel Theft (1915, Short) .... Detective Tom Sparks (as M.J. MacQuarrie)
- The Flag of Fortune (1915, Short) .... Grandpa
- The Trap That Failed (1915, Short) .... Frank Harwood
- The Sacrifice of Jonathan Gray (1915, Short) .... Jonathan Gray
- Colonel Steel, Master Gambler (1915, Short) .... Colonel Steele
- Babbling Tongues (1915, Short) .... Martin Lowe
- X-3 (1916, Short) .... Henshaw
- The Fatal Introduction (1916, Short) .... Jim Claverling
- On Dangerous Ground (1916, Short) .... Louis Goldenberg
- The Stain in the Blood (1916) .... Bill Jenkins (as Murdock J. MacQuarrie)
- Nancy's Birthright (1916) .... John Martingale
- The Narrow Creed (1916, Short) .... Dr. Hendricks
- Life's Maelstrom (1916, Short) .... John Barclay
- Accusing Evidence (1916, Short)
- Panthea (1917) .... Police Agent
- John Bates' Secret (1917, Short) .... John Bates, a.k.a. Edward Stevenson
- John Osborne's Triumph (1917, Short) .... John Osborne
- Fear Not (1917) .... Allen Mornington
- The Kingdom of Love (1917) .... Buck, Dance Hall Owner
- Loyalty (1917) .... Randell
- Humility (1918) .... Stuart Hamilton
- Her Moment (1918) .... Mr. Johnson (credited as Murdock McQuarrie)
- Riders of the Purple Sage (1918) .... Tull
- Gambling in Souls (1919) .... Thomas Philborn
- When a Woman Strikes (1919)
- Jacques of the Silver North (1919) .... Jim Blake
- The Little Diplomat (1919) .... Raymond Brownleigh

==== 1920s ====
- The Silver Horde (1920) .... Richard Jones
- Sure Fire (1921) .... Major Parker
- Cheated Hearts (1921) .... Ibrahim
- The Unfoldment (1922) .... Mayor of Avenue A
- The Hidden Woman (1922) .... Iron MacLoid
- If I Were Queen (1922) .... Duke of Wortz
- Canyon of the Fools (1923) .... Sproul
- Ashes of Vengeance (1923) .... Carlotte
- The Only Woman (1924) .... Yacht Captain
- A Gentleman Roughneck (1925)
- The High Hand (1926) .... Martin Shaler
- Going the Limit (1926) .... Simson Windsor
- Hair-Trigger Baxter (1926) .... Joe Craddock
- The Jazz Girl (1926) .... Henry Wade
- The Long Loop on the Pecos (1927)
- The Man from Hard Pan (1927) .... Henry Hardy
- Black Jack (1927) .... Holbrook
- The Apache Raider (1928) .... Don Felix Beinal
- .45 Calibre War (1929) .... Mark Blodgett
- The Love Parade (1929) .... First Radio Announcer (uncredited)

==== 1930s ====
- Troopers Three (1930) .... Army Officer
- Captain of the Guard (1930) .... Pierre
- Pardon My Gun (1930) .... Rancher (uncredited)
- The Lottery Bride (1930) .... Captain Larsen (uncredited)
- Command Performance (1931) .... Blondel
- The Drums of Jeopardy (1931) .... Stephen (uncredited)
- Hell Bound (1931)
- Two Gun Man (1931) .... Rancher Markham
- Law of the Rio Grande (1931) .... Saloon Gambler (uncredited)
- Sundown Trail (1931) .... Executor of the Estate
- Arizona Terror (1931) .... Joe Moore
- Near the Trail's End (1931) .... Dan Cather
- Grief Street (1931) .... 2nd Theater Doorman (uncredited)
- Lariats and Sixshooters (1931) .... Townsman (uncredited)
- The Devil Plays (1931) .... Butler
- The Wide Open Spaces (1931, Short) .... Townsman at Wedding (as Murdock McQuarrie)
- Dr. Jekyll and Mr. Hyde (1931) .... Dissenting doctor in crowd (uncredited)
- One Man Law (1932) .... Ed Grimm (credited as Murdock McQuarrie)
- The Shadow of the Eagle (1932, Serial) .... Frank - Watchman (uncredited)
- Forty-Five Calibre Echo (1932) .... Old man in saloon (uncredited)
- Cross-Examination (1932) .... Court Officer (uncredited)
- Texas Cyclone (1932) .... Courtroom Spectator (uncredited)
- The Saddle Buster (1932) .... Doc (uncredited)
- Border Devils (1932) .... Townsman (uncredited)
- Rule 'Em and Weep (1932, Short)
- Daring Danger (1932) .... 'Pa' Norris
- Ride Him, Cowboy (1932) .... Doctor attending Webb (uncredited)
- Fighting for Justice (1932) .... Sheriff (uncredited)
- Two Lips and Juleps; or, Southern Love and Northern Exposure (1932, Short)
- Wild Girl (1932) .... Jess Larabee (uncredited)
- The Gambling Sex (1932) .... Thompson
- The Penal Code (1932) .... Lefty
- Phantom Thunderbolt (1933) .... Townsman (uncredited)
- Son of the Border (1933) .... Townsman (uncredited)
- The Lone Avenger (1933) .... Townsman (uncredited)
- Cross Fire (1933) .... Sheriff Jim Wells
- Easy Millions (1933)
- Stolen by Gypsies or Beer and Bicycles (1933, Short) .... Sheriff
- One Year Later (1933) .... Well-Wisher at Train Station (uncredited)
- Girl Trouble (1933) .... Townsman (uncredited)
- Roman Scandals (1933) .... Senator Fool (uncredited)
- Potluck Pards (1934, Short) .... 'Pop' Hennessey
- The House of Rothschild (1934) .... Man at Stock Exchange (uncredited)
- Romance Revier (1934, Short) .... Banker William Carter
- Randy Rides Alone (1934) .... Murder victim (uncredited)
- Smoking Guns (1934) .... Townsman (uncredited)
- Going Bye-Bye! (1934, Short) .... Jury Foreman
- Fighting Hero (1934) .... Prosecutor
- The Tonto Kid (1934) .... 'Pop' Slawson (as Murdock McQuarrie)
- The Man from Hell (1934) .... Sheriff Jake Klein
- The Dude Ranger (1934) .... Doc Welsh (uncredited)
- The Return of Chandu (1934, Serial) .... The "Voice" of Ubasti [Chs. 4-12]
- Terror of the Plains (1934) .... Foreman Cole (as Murdock McQuarrie)
- When Lightning Strikes (1934) .... Jim Caldwell
- The Mighty Barnum (1934) .... Husband at Table (uncredited)
- Clive of India (1935) .... Sneering Man (uncredited)
- North of Arizona (1935) .... Marshal Herron
- Outlaw Rule (1935) .... Coroner Williamson (uncredited)
- Les Misérables (1935) .... Fauchelevant (uncredited)
- Stone of Silver Creek (1935) .... George J. Mason
- Bride of Frankenstein (1935) .... Sympathetic villager (uncredited)
- Gun Smoke (1935) .... Card Player (uncredited)
- Silent Valley (1935) .... Elmer Barnes (rancher)
- The Laramie Kid (1935) .... Dad Bland
- Outlawed Guns (1935) .... Banker Honeycutt (uncredited)
- Bonnie Scotland (1935) .... Recruiting Clerk (uncredited)
- Diamond Jim (1935) .... Stockbroker (uncredited)
- The Dark Angel (1935) .... Waiter at Inn (uncredited)
- The New Frontier (1935) .... Tom Lewis
- Nevada (1935) .... Watson (uncredited)
- Lawless Riders (1935) .... Townsman (uncredited)
- The Shadow of Silk Lennox (1935) .... Haskell, Silk's Lawyer (uncredited)
- Sunset of Power (1935) .... Doctor
- I'll Name the Murderer (1936) .... Wreck Witness (uncredited)
- Modern Times (1936) .... J. Widdecombe Billows (as Murdoch McQuarrie)
- The Prisoner of Shark Island (1936) .... Edman Spangler (uncredited)
- The Drag-Net (1936) - Hot-Check Gambler (uncredited)
- Pinto Rustlers (1936) .... Ed Walton
- The Lonely Trail (1936) .... Rancher (uncredited)
- Fury (1936) .... Dawson's friend (uncredited)
- Winds of the Wasteland (1936) .... Townsman (uncredited)
- Shakedown (1936) .... Attendant (uncredited)
- Prison Shadows (1936) .... Fight fan (uncredited)
- The Idaho Kid (1936) .... Townsman (uncredited)
- Santa Fe Bound (1936) .... Dad Bates (uncredited)
- Oh, Susanna! (1936) .... Sage City Townsman (uncredited)
- Ride 'Em Cowboy (1936) .... Race Spectator (uncredited)
- Cavalry (1936) .... Townsman (uncredited)
- Song of the Gringo (1936) .... Townsman (uncredited)
- Roarin' Lead (1936) .... Sims (uncredited)
- The Old Corral (1936) .... Townsman (uncredited)
- Stormy Trails (1936) .... Sheriff
- Great Guy (1936) .... Mr. Marvin (a client) (uncredited)
- Hittin' the Trail (1937) .... Townsman (uncredited)
- Venus Makes Trouble (1937) .... Sour-faced Man (uncredited)
- Back to the Woods (1937) .... Judge (uncredited)
- Pick a Star (1937) .... Jefferson Watts - Undertaker (uncredited)
- The Fighting Texan (1937) .... Jim Perkins
- Flying Fists (1937) .... Health Camp Man (uncredited)
- Slaves in Bondage (1937) .... Gambler (uncredited)
- On Such a Night (1937) .... Vasalia Juror (uncredited)
- Stars Over Arizona (1937) .... Townsman (uncredited)
- Zorro Rides Again (1937, Serial) .... Jones (night watchman) [Ch. 10] (uncredited)
- The Jury's Secret (1938) .... Flood Victim (uncredited)
- The Purple Vigilantes (1938) .... Juror (uncredited)
- The Lone Ranger (1938, Serial) .... Matt Clark [Ch. 6] (uncredited)
- Cattle Raiders (1938) .... Juror (uncredited)
- Frontier Town (1938) .... Townsman (uncredited)
- Topa Topa (1938) .... Hunter (uncredited)
- Outlaws of Sonora (1938) .... Barfly (uncredited)
- Western Trails (1938) (uncredited) .... Williams - Station Master (uncredited)
- Blockade (1938) .... Seaman (uncredited)
- Guilty Trails (1938) .... Judge Howard
- Prairie Justice (1938) .... Stage Line Agent (uncredited)
- Santa Fe Stampede (1938) .... Townsman (uncredited)
- Ghost Town Riders (1938) .... Tax Collector Harry Branson
- Tom Sawyer, Detective (1938) .... Posse Member (uncredited)
- Stand Up and Fight (1939) .... Engineer (uncredited)
- Disbarred (1939) .... First Jury Foreman (uncredited)
- Honor of the West (1939) .... Hank (as Murdock McQuarrie)
- The Phantom Stage (1939) .... John Scott -Stage Agent
- Arizona Legion (1939) .... Party Guest (uncredited)
- Smoky Trails (1939) .... Will Archer
- Wolf Call (1939) .... Miner (uncredited)
- They All Come Out (1939) .... Watchman (uncredited)
- Colorado Sunset (1939) .... Dairyman Jones (uncredited)
- Mutiny on the Blackhawk (1939) .... Bill, a Settler (uncredited)
- Konga, the Wild Stallion (1939) .... Clerk (uncredited)
- At the Circus (1939) .... Attendant (uncredited)
- Tower of London (1939) .... Councilman (uncredited)
- Cowboys from Texas (1939) .... Congressman (uncredited)
- Death Rides the Range (1939) .... Sheriff (uncredited)

==== 1940s ====
- The Shadow (1940, Serial) .... Richards, Rand's Butler [Chs. 2-3] (uncredited)
- The House of the Seven Gables (1940) .... Town Gossip (uncredited)
- The Showdown (1940) .... Zeke (uncredited)
- An Angel from Texas (1940) .... Lone Star Townsman (uncredited)
- Pinto Canyon (1940) .... Rancher Barnes
- Those Were the Days! (1940) .... First Citizen (uncredited)
- The Captain Is a Lady (1940) .... Seaman (uncredited)
- Boys of the City (1940) .... Man on Sidewalk Watching Fight (uncredited)
- Deadwood Dick (1940, Serial) .... Jasper Kenyon [Chs. 11-13] (uncredited)
- Brigham Young (1940) .... Minor Role (uncredited)
- The Mummy's Hand (1940) .... Temple Priest (uncredited)
- Frontier Vengeance (1940) .... Townsman (uncredited)
- The Wildcat of Tucson (1940) .... Doctor (uncredited)
- Federal Fugitives (1941) .... Night Watchman (uncredited)
- The Return of Daniel Boone (1941) .... Telegrapher (uncredited)
- Paper Bullets (1941) .... 1st Bailiff (uncredited)
- They Meet Again (1941) .... Juror (uncredited)
- Arizona Bound (1941) .... Zeke (uncredited)
- The Richest Man in Town (1941) .... Postman (uncredited)
- Man from Montana (1941) .... Joel Preston
- Freckles Comes Home (1942) .... Bus Passenger / Indiana Townsman (uncredited)
- Woman of the Year (1942) .... Head Copy Reader (uncredited)
- Ghost Town Law (1942) .... Judge Crail
- The Corpse Vanishes (1942) .... The Minister (uncredited)
- Tombstone, the Town Too Tough to Die (1942) .... Townsman (uncredited)
- Jackass Mail (1942) .... Hickory Jake (uncredited)
- Timber (1942) .... Old Timer (uncredited)
- The Omaha Trail (1942) .... Oxen Owner (uncredited)
- Cat People (1942) .... Sheep caretaker (uncredited)
- Arabian Nights (1942) .... Bidder (uncredited)
- Dr. Terror's House of Horrors (1943) .... The High Priest (segment "The Panther Men of Zuma") (archive footage)
- Wolves of the Range (1943) .... Stock footage townsman (uncredited)
- Silver City Raiders (1943) .... Townsman (uncredited)

=== Director ===
- The Old Cobbler (1914)
- The Old Bell-Ringer (1914)
- The Nihilists (1914)
- The Wall of Flame (1914)
- The Star Gazer (1914)
- Two Thieves (1914)
- As We Journey Through Life (1914)
- The Christmas Spirit (1914)
- For I Have Toiled (1914)
- When It's One of Your Own (1914)
- His Last Performance (1915)
- The Clutch of the Emperor (1915)
- The Useless One (1915)
- The Dear Old Hypocrite (1915)
- Alias Mr. Smith (1915)
- Seven and Seventy (1915)
- The Prayer of a Horse or: His Life Story Told by Himself (1915)
- Wheels Within Wheels (1915)
- The Truth About Dan Deering (1915)
- The Old Tutor (1915)
- The Troubadour (1915)
- Where Brains Are Needed (1915)
- The Old Doctor (1915)
- The Swinging Doors (1915)
- The Tinker of Stubbenville (1915)
- The Old Grouch (1915)
- The Closing Chapter (1915)
- Mein Friendt Schneider (1915) (credited as Murdock McQuarrie)
- His Beloved Violin (1915)
- Ethel's Burglar (1915)
- The Mystery of the Tapestry Room (1915)
- The Finest Gold (1915)
- The Tam o' Shanter (1915)
- The Sheriff of Red Rock Gulch (1915)
- The $50,000 Jewel Theft (1915)
- The Flag of Fortune (1915)
- The Trap That Failed (1915)
- The Sacrifice of Jonathan Gray (1915)
- Colonel Steel, Master Gambler (1915)
- Babbling Tongues (1915)
- In the Web of the Grafters (1916)
- The Fatal Introduction (1916)
- On Dangerous Ground (1916)
- The Stain in the Blood (1916)
- Nancy's Birthright (1916)
- The Sign of the Spade (1916)
- Sandy, Reformer (1916) (completed film)
- El Diablo (1916)
- The Gambler's Lost Love (1916)
- John Osborne's Triumph (1917)
- Thunderbolt Jack (1920)
- The Unfoldment (1922)

=== Writer ===
- The Hopes of Blind Alley (1914) (story)
- Ethel's Burglar (1915) (scenario)
- The $50,000 Jewel Theft (1915)
- Life's Maelstrom (1916) (scenario)
