= George Cleveland =

Canadian-American actor (1885–1957)

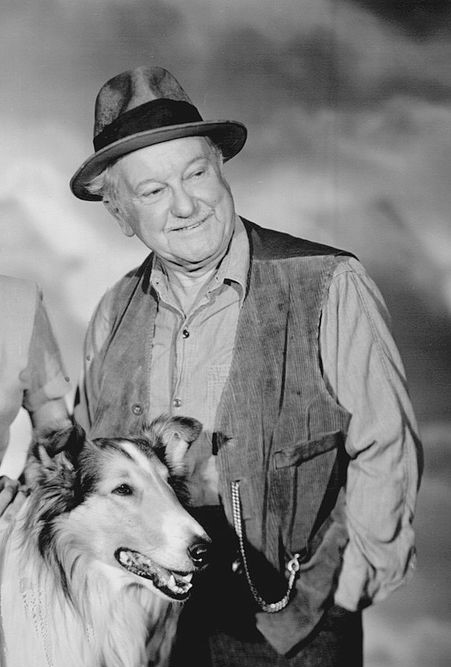
- Cleveland in Lassie (1954)
- Born: Grover Alan Cleveland; September 17, 1885; Sydney, Nova Scotia
- Died: July 15, 1957 (aged 71); Burbank, California, U.S.
- Occupation: Actor
- Years active: 1930–1957
- Spouses: Helen Cleveland (m. 1905; ? 190?); Victory Bateman (m. 1910; died 1926) Dorothy Melleck (m. 1955)

Grover Alan "George" Cleveland (September 17, 1885 – July 15, 1957) was a Canadian film actor. He appeared in more than 180 films from 1930 to 1954.

== Career ==
Cleveland was born in Sydney, Nova Scotia, Canada. His first appearance on the stage was in The Octaroon as a teenager in 1899. Cleveland was active as a vaudevillian before moving to Hollywood in 1936 where he worked in films via acting, producing and directing.

From 1904 to 1906, Cleveland toured the world with a repertory company headed by T. Daniel Frawley. He later toured major cities in the United States performing in a repertoire of seven plays by Shakespeare.

Cleveland's work on stage included performing with the Mary Daniel Players in Port Richmond, Staten Island, New York, and the Cloninger Company in Salt Lake City, Utah.

Although Cleveland played in more than 150 films during his 58-year career in show business, he acknowledged that he was most well-known for his role as George "Gramps" Miller in the early years of the long running American television series Lassie. Cleveland appeared in the first three seasons (1954–1956) and in the first 12 episodes of the fourth season (1957). His death in July 1957 was written into the 13th episode of the fourth season (1957) and became the storyline motive for the selling of the farm and the departure of the Millers for Capitol City.

== Death ==
Cleveland died of a heart attack on July 15, 1957, in Burbank, California, at age 71. He was survived by his spouse Dorothy Melleck, whom he married as a widower in 1955. Cleveland was previously married to Victory Bateman (20 years his senior), from 1910 to 1926, whom he had met while both actors were touring in Vaudeville.

== Selected filmography ==
- The Thoroughbred (1930) - Detective (uncredited)
- Sky Raiders (1931) - John - the Air Dispatcher (uncredited)
- He Couldn't Take It (1933) - Drunk (uncredited)
- A Woman's Man (1934) - Announcer at Premiere (uncredited)
- Mystery Liner (1934) - Simms the Steward
- School for Girls (1934) - Reeves
- House of Mystery (1934) - Detective Clancy (uncredited)
- Voice in the Night (1934) - Worker (uncredited)
- City Limits (1934) - Graflex (uncredited)
- Blue Steel (1934) - Hank - Innkeeper
- The Man from Utah (1934) - Nevada Sheriff
- Monte Carlo Nights (1934) - Croupier
- The Star Packer (1934) - Jake - Cook (uncredited)
- Girl o' My Dreams (1934) - Newsreel Company Man (uncredited)
- The Hoosier Schoolmaster (1935) - Townsman (uncredited)
- Make a Million (1935) - Fake Blind Beggar
- The Keeper of the Bees (1935) - Judge
- She Gets Her Man (1935) - Drunk in Lunch Room (uncredited)
- Cheers of the Crowd (1935) - Newsreel Man (uncredited)
- The Public Menace (1935) - Ship's Pilot (uncredited)
- His Night Out (1935) - Detective
- The Spanish Cape Mystery (1935) - Jorum
- Forced Landing (1935) - Jolly
- I Conquer the Sea! (1936) - Caleb Ashley
- Black Gold (1936) - Clemmons
- Don't Get Personal (1936) - The Farmer
- Brilliant Marriage (1936) - Bartender
- Flash Gordon (1936, Serial) - Professor Hensley
- Rio Grande Romance (1936) - Sheriff Williams
- Revolt of the Zombies (1936) - Gen. Duval
- Two-Fisted Gentleman (1936) - Mr. Bainbridge
- Phantom Patrol (1936) - Inspector McCloud
- Robinson Crusoe of Clipper Island (1936) - Goebel - Gang Scientist
- North of Nome (1936) - Ship Captain
- The Plainsman (1936) - Van Ellyn Associate (uncredited)
- The Devil Diamond (1937) - George Davis
- Breezing Home (1937) - Politician (uncredited)
- Paradise Express (1937) - Farmer Beasley
- Swing It, Professor (1937) - Dean
- Night Key (1937) - Sam Adams - Company Engineer (uncredited)
- West Bound Limited (1937) - Division Superintendent (uncredited)
- The Toast of New York (1937) - Perkins - Luke's Secretary in Boston (uncredited)
- Atlantic Flight (1937) - Old-Timer in Diner (uncredited)
- Trapped by G-Men (1937) - Miner
- Small Town Boy (1937) - Police Station Man (unconfirmed)
- Behind the Mike (1937) - Stable Man
- A Girl with Ideas (1937) - Malladay (uncredited)
- Adventure's End (1937) - Tom
- Boy of the Streets (1937) - Tim 'Flannel-Mouth' Farley
- Prescription for Romance (1937) - Cab Driver (uncredited)
- The Lone Ranger (1938, Serial) - George Blanchard
- Born to Be Wild (1938) - Stevens (uncredited)
- The Port of Missing Girls (1938) - Clinton
- Rose of the Rio Grande (1938) - Pedro
- Flash Gordon's Trip to Mars (1938, Serial) - Professor Hensley (scenes deleted)
- Outlaws of Sonora (1938) - Association Director (uncredited)
- Romance of the Limberlost (1938) - Nathan
- Prison Break (1938) - Ding
- Under the Big Top (1938) - Joe
- The Strange Case of Dr. Meade (1938) - Thurber
- Ghost Town Riders (1938) - Judge Stillwell
- Convict's Code (1939) - Gas Station Attendant (uncredited)
- Home on the Prairie (1939) - Jim Wheeler
- The Phantom Stage (1939) - Sidekick Grizzly
- Streets of New York (1939) - Pop O'Toole
- Wolf Call (1939) - Dr. MacTavish
- Stunt Pilot (1939) - Sheriff
- Konga, the Wild Stallion (1939) - Tabor
- Dick Tracy's G-Men (1939, Serial) - Gramps Williams (uncredited)
- Mutiny in the Big House (1939) - Convict 'Dad' Schultz
- Overland Mail (1939) - Frank Porter - aka Saunders
- Hidden Enemy (1940) - John MacGregor
- Chasing Trouble (1940) - Lester
- Pioneers of the West (1940) - Dr. Bailey
- Queen of the Yukon (1940) - Dr. Bailey
- Drums of Fu Manchu (1940, Serial) - Dr. James Parker [Ch.1]
- Midnight Limited (1940) - Prof. Van Dillon
- Blazing Six Shooters (1940) - Mark Rawlins
- Tomboy (1940) - Uncle Matt
- One Man's Law (1940) - Judge Wingate
- Haunted House (1940) - Albert Henshaw
- Queen of the Yukon (1940) - Grub
- The Ape (1940) - Mr. Howley (uncredited)
- West of Abilene (1940) - Bill Burnside
- The Wild Stallion (1940)
- Hi-Yo Silver (1940) - George Blanchard (archive footage)
- A Girl, a Guy and a Gob (1941) - Pop Duncan
- Nevada City (1941) - Hank Liddell
- Two in a Taxi (1941) - Gas Station Proprietor
- Sunset in Wyoming (1941) - Asa Wentworth
- Wide Open Town (1941) - Pete Carter - Miner (uncredited)
- Man at Large (1941) - Sheriff Pickering
- Riders of the Purple Sage (1941) - Doctor (uncredited)
- The Devil and Daniel Webster (1941) - Cy Bibber
- Look Who's Laughing (1941) - Kelsey
- Two-Faced Woman (1941) - Minor Role (uncredited)
- Playmates (1941) - Mr. Nelson Pennypacker (uncredited)
- Call Out the Marines (1942) - Bartender
- Obliging Young Lady (1942) - Clarence - Manager of Lake Mohawk Lodge
- Valley of the Sun (1942) - Bill Yard
- The Spoilers (1942) - Banty
- My Favorite Spy (1942) - Gus
- The Falcon Takes Over (1942) - Jerry - Servant (uncredited)
- Powder Town (1942) - Gus, Institute Janitor
- The Big Street (1942) - Colonel Samuel Venus
- Mexican Spitfire's Elephant (1942) - Chief Customs Inspector (uncredited)
- Highways by Night (1942) - Judkins - Hotel Manager
- Here We Go Again (1942) - Ramble Inn Proprietor (uncredited)
- Army Surgeon (1942) - Col. John Wishart
- Seven Miles from Alcatraz (1942) - Captain Porter
- The Traitor Within (1942) - 'Pop' Betts
- Ladies' Day (1943) - Doc, Sox Trainer
- Cowboy in Manhattan (1943) - Wild Bill
- The Man from Music Mountain (1943) - Sheriff Hal Darcey
- Klondike Kate (1943) - Judge Horace Crawford
- The Woman of the Town (1943) - Judge Blackburn
- It Happened Tomorrow (1944) - Mr. Gordon
- My Best Gal (1944) - Ralph Hodges
- Man from Frisco (1944) - Mayor Winter (uncredited)
- The Yellow Rose of Texas (1944) - Captain 'Cap' Joe
- Abroad with Two Yanks (1944) - Roderick Stuart
- My Pal Wolf (1944) - Wilson
- When the Lights Go On Again (1944) - Pat 'Gramps' Benson
- Alaska (1944) - Pete (Postmaster)
- Can't Help Singing (1944) - Marshal
- God Is My Co-Pilot (1945) - Father of Catherine Scott (uncredited)
- Song of the Sarong (1945) - Captain William Reemis
- It's in the Bag! (1945) - Busby - Hotel Manager
- Her Highness and the Bellboy (1945) - Dr. Elfson
- Sunbonnet Sue (1945) - Casey, Tavern Owner
- Senorita from the West (1945) - Cap
- Dakota (1945) - Mr. Plummer
- She Wouldn't Say Yes (1945) - Ticket Seller (uncredited)
- Pillow of Death (1945) - Samuel 'Sam' Kincaid
- Little Giant (1946) - Clarence Goodring
- The Runaround (1946) - Feenan the cabbie
- Boys' Ranch (1946) - Butch's Grandpa (uncredited)
- Courage of Lassie (1946) - Old Man
- Wild Beauty (1946) - Barney Skeets
- Step by Step (1946) - Captain Caleb Simpson
- Angel on My Shoulder (1946) - Albert
- Wake Up and Dream (1946) - Prof. Feverfew (uncredited)
- The Show-Off (1946) - Pop Fisher
- Easy Come, Easy Go (1947) - Gilligan
- I Wonder Who's Kissing Her Now (1947) - John McCullem
- Mother Wore Tights (1947) - Grandfather McKinley
- The Wistful Widow of Wagon Gap (1947) - Judge Benbow
- My Wild Irish Rose (1947) - Captain Brennan
- Albuquerque (1948) - John Armin
- Fury at Furnace Creek (1948) - Judge
- A Date with Judy (1948) - Gramps
- Miraculous Journey (1948) - The Hermit
- The Plunderers (1948) - Sheriff Sam Borden
- Rimfire (1949) - Judge Gardner
- Home in San Antone (1949) - Grandpa Gibson
- Kazan (1949) - Trapper
- Miss Grant Takes Richmond (1949) - Judge Ben Grant
- The Boy from Indiana (1950) - Robert Bruce Mac Dougall
- Please Believe Me (1950) - Mr. Cooper
- Trigger, Jr. (1950) - Colonel Harkrider
- Frenchie (1950) - Mayor Jefferson Harding
- Fort Defiance (1951) - Uncle Charlie Tallon
- Flaming Feather (1952) - Doc Fallon
- Carson City (1952) - Henry Dodson
- Cripple Creek (1952) - 'Hardrock' Hanson
- The WAC from Walla Walla (1952) - Gramps Canova
- San Antone (1953) - Colonel Allerby
- Affair with a Stranger (1953) - Pop
- Walking My Baby Back Home (1953) - Col. Dan Wallace
- Racing Blood (1954) - Gramps
- Untamed Heiress (1954) - Andrew 'Cactus' Clayton
- Fireman Save My Child (1954) - Chief Rorty
- The Outlaw's Daughter (1954) - Lem Creel
