= Guilty Trails =

Film directed by George Waggner

- Directed by: George Waggner
- Screenplay by: George Waggner
- Story by: George Waggner
- Produced by: Trem Carr
- Starring: Bob Baker; Marjorie Reynolds; Wally Wales; Georgia O'Dell; Jack Rockwell; Carleton Young
- Cinematography: Gus Peterson
- Edited by: Carl Pierson
- Music by: Frank Sanucci
- Production company: Universal Pictures
- Distributed by: Universal Pictures
- Release date: October 21, 1938
- Running time: 57 minutes
- Country: United States
- Language: English

Guilty Trails is a 1938 American Western film written and directed by George Waggner. The film stars Bob Baker, Marjorie Reynolds, Wally Wales, Georgia O'Dell, Jack Rockwell and Carleton Young. The film was released on October 21, 1938, by Universal Pictures.

== Cast ==
- Bob Baker as Bob Higgins
- Marjorie Reynolds as Jackie Lawson
- Wally Wales as Sundown Ansel
- Georgia O'Dell as Aunt Martha Lawson
- Jack Rockwell as Brad Eason
- Carleton Young as Steve Yates
- Forrest Taylor as Dan Lawson
- Glenn Strange as Sheriff
- Murdock MacQuarrie as Judge Howard
