= Desperate Trails =

Desperate Trails can refer to:

- Desperate Trails (1921 film), a 1921 film
- Desperate Trails (1939 film), a 1939 film
- The Desperate Trail, a 1994 film
