= Honor of the West =

- Theatrical release poster
- Directed by: George Waggner
- Screenplay by: George Waggner
- Story by: George Waggner
- Produced by: Trem Carr
- Starring: Bob Baker; Marge Champion; Carleton Young; Forrest Taylor; Glenn Strange; Reed Howes
- Cinematography: Harry Neumann
- Edited by: Charles Craft
- Production company: Universal Pictures
- Distributed by: Universal Pictures
- Release date: January 13, 1939
- Running time: 60 minutes
- Country: United States
- Language: English

Honor of the West is a 1939 American Western film written and directed by George Waggner. The film stars Bob Baker, Marge Champion, Carleton Young, Forrest Taylor, Glenn Strange and Reed Howes. The film was released on January 13, 1939, by Universal Pictures.

== Cast ==
- Bob Baker as Bob Barrett
- Marge Champion as Diane Allen
- Carleton Young as Russ Whitley
- Forrest Taylor as Lem Walker
- Glenn Strange as Bat Morrison
- Reed Howes as Tom Morrison
- Frank Ellis as Butch Grimes
- Jack Kirk as Heck Claiborne
- Murdock MacQuarrie as Hank
- Walter Wills as Rancher
- Arthur Thalasso as Rodeo Announcer
