= Black Bandit =

Film directed by George Waggner

- Theatrical release poster
- Directed by: George Waggner
- Screenplay by: George Waggner
- Story by: George Waggner
- Produced by: Trem Carr
- Starring: Bob Baker; Marjorie Reynolds; Wally Wales; Jack Rockwell; Forrest Taylor; Glenn Strange
- Cinematography: Gus Peterson
- Edited by: Carl Pierson
- Production company: Universal Pictures
- Distributed by: Universal Pictures
- Release date: September 16, 1938
- Running time: 58 minutes
- Country: United States
- Language: English

Black Bandit is a 1938 American Western film written and directed by George Waggner. The film stars Bob Baker, Marjorie Reynolds, Wally Wales, Jack Rockwell, Forrest Taylor and Glenn Strange. The film was released on September 16, 1938, by Universal Pictures.

== Plot ==
Bob and Don Ramsay are twin brothers in opposite sides of the law since Bob is the Sheriff and Don is an outlaw that goes by the name Black Bandit, one time the Black Bandit strikes and is seen, but the blame goes to his identical brother Bob.

== Cast ==
- Bob Baker as Sheriff Bob Ramsay / Don Ramsay
- Marjorie Reynolds as Jane Allen
- Wally Wales as Weepy
- Jack Rockwell as Boyd Allen
- Forrest Taylor as Sheriff Robert Warner
- Glenn Strange as Luke Johnson
- Arthur Van Slyke as Dad Ramsay
- Carleton Young as Cash
- Dick Dickinson as Clint Evans
- Schuyler Standish as Bob Ramsay
- Rex Downing as Young Don
