= Riders of Pasco Basin =

- Theatrical release poster
- Directed by: Ray Taylor
- Screenplay by: Ford Beebe
- Story by: Ford Beebe
- Produced by: Joseph Gershenson
- Starring: Johnny Mack Brown; Bob Baker; Fuzzy Knight; Frances Robinson; Arthur Loft; Ted Adams
- Cinematography: William A. Sickner
- Edited by: Louis Sackin
- Production company: Universal Pictures
- Distributed by: Universal Pictures
- Release date: April 5, 1940
- Running time: 56 minutes
- Country: United States
- Language: English

Riders of Pasco Basin is a 1940 American Western film directed by Ray Taylor and written by Ford Beebe. The film stars Johnny Mack Brown, Bob Baker, Fuzzy Knight, Frances Robinson, Arthur Loft and Ted Adams. The film was released on April 5, 1940, by Universal Pictures.

== Cast ==
- Johnny Mack Brown as Lee Jamison
- Bob Baker as Bruce Moore
- Fuzzy Knight as Luther
- Frances Robinson as Jean Madison
- Arthur Loft as Matthew Kirby
- Ted Adams as Magee
- Frank LaRue as Joel Madison
- William Gould as Caleb Scott
- James Guilfoyle as John Evans
- Ed Cassidy as Sheriff Ed Marlowe
- Lafe McKee as Uncle Dan
- Robert Winkler as Tommy Scott
- Chuck Morrison as Johnson
- Rudy Sooter as himself
