= Ghost Town Riders =

1938 film directed by George Waggner

- Theatrical release poster
- Directed by: George Waggner
- Screenplay by: George Waggner
- Produced by: Trem Carr
- Starring: Bob Baker; Fay McKenzie; Hank Worden; George Cleveland; Forrest Taylor; Glenn Strange
- Cinematography: Harry Neumann
- Edited by: Carl Pierson
- Music by: Frank Sanucci
- Production company: Universal Pictures
- Distributed by: Universal Pictures
- Release date: December 16, 1938
- Running time: 54 minutes
- Country: United States
- Language: English

Ghost Town Riders is a 1938 American Western film written and directed by George Waggner. The film stars Bob Baker, Fay McKenzie, Hank Worden, George Cleveland, Forrest Taylor and Glenn Strange. The film was released on December 16, 1938, by Universal Pictures.

== Cast ==
- Bob Baker as Bob Martin
- Fay McKenzie as Molly Taylor
- Hank Worden as Tom 'Cherokee' Walton
- George Cleveland as Judge Stillwell
- Forrest Taylor as Gomer
- Glenn Strange as Tex
- Jack Kirk as Slim
- Martin Turner as Rosebud
- Reed Howes as Fred
- Murdock MacQuarrie as Harry Branson
