= Accusing Evidence =

1916 film

- Directed by: Allan Dwan
- Starring: Lon Chaney; Murdock MacQuarrie; Pauline Bush
- Distributed by: Universal Pictures
- Release date: November 14, 1916
- Running time: One reel (ten minutes)
- Country: United States
- Languages: Silent; English intertitles

Accusing Evidence is a 1914 American silent Western film directed by Allan Dwan (not released until 1916) and starring Lon Chaney, Pauline Bush and Murdock MacQuarrie.

The film was likely produced by early 1914 but only theatrically released in 1916, due to the actors who appear in the cast with Chaney. For one thing, Pauline Bush wasn't even working for Universal in 1916, and Chaney hadn't worked for director Allan Dwan since 1914. The general opinion is that this film was shot in early 1914 when Chaney made The Honor of the Mounted with Murdock MacQuarrie for Allan Dwan, but the film's release was delayed for some reason for more than two years.

Another theory is that this film could actually be The Honor of the Mounted (or even the 1913 Bloodhounds of the North perhaps) retitled and repackaged. Since the films are all lost, it is impossible to tell, but no reviews or stills exist in any of the 1916 trade journals for this specific title. The bare bones plot synopsis that exists for Accusing Evidence in Universal's records doesn't quite match either of those two earlier films, however.

== Plot ==
Lon, a Northwest Mounted police officer, is in love with a young lady who lives in the woods. He is falsely accused of a breach of duty and, rather than sully the reputation of the Mounted Police corps, he just accepts the charges without protest. He is later vindicated and returned to duty at the end of the film.

== Cast ==
- Murdock MacQuarrie
- Pauline Bush as the young girl of the woods
- Lon Chaney as Lon, a Northwest Mounted police officer

== Reception ==
Film historian Jon Mirsalis opines "The three stars and director Dwan worked on two films that are similar, but not identical: BLOODHOUNDS OF THE NORTH (released in December, 1913) and THE HONOR OF THE MOUNTED (released in February, 1914). It is possible that this was cut together from those two films and released as a "new" picture. Alternatively, this film may have been shot at the same time as those two pictures, but due to some unknown difficulty, was not released for almost three years. With none of the three films surviving, it is a mystery that may never be solved. Chaney biographer Michael F. Blake agrees.
