= Joseph H. Lewis =

American filmmaker (1907-2000)

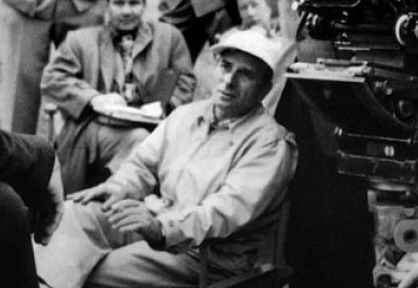
- Lewis on the set of The Undercover Man (1949).
- Born: April 6, 1907; New York City, New York, U.S.
- Died: August 30, 2000 (aged 93); Marina del Rey, California, U.S.
- Education: DeWitt Clinton High School
- Occupations: Director; editor
- Years active: 1935–1966
- Spouse(s): Buena Vista Lewis (?–2000; his death; 1 child)
- Children: Candy Lewis Sangster
- Parent(s): Ernestine Miriamson Lewis; Leopold Lewis

Joseph H. Lewis (April 6, 1907 – August 30, 2000) was an American director and editor of film and television. In a 30-year directorial career, he directed numerous low-budget westerns, action pictures, musicals, adventures, and thrillers. His stylish B-movies came to be appreciated by auteur theory-espousing film critics in the years following his retirement in 1966.

He is known for the films Minstrel Man (1944), The Jolson Story (1946, for which he directed the musical sequences), So Dark the Night (1946), Gun Crazy (1950), and The Big Combo (1955).

== Life and career ==
Born in Brooklyn, the son of Russian Jewish immigrants, Ernestine (née Miriamson) and Leopold Lewis. His father was an optometrist. He grew up on the Upper East Side of New York City and attended DeWitt Clinton High School in the Bronx and when his brother, Ben, moved to Hollywood in 1927, he decided to follow with the hope of becoming an actor. Ben found him a job as camera assistant and, subsequently, young Joseph became an assistant film editor just as the film industry was converting to sound.

In the mid-1930s he was chief of the editorial staff of Mascot Pictures. Colleague William Witney recalled, "Joe Lewis was a handsome, curly-haired man with a ready smile, in his late twenties, and an excellent film editor. It was his job to oversee the editing of all the pictures. Shortly after [Mascot's successor] Republic was formed, Joe Lewis quit as the head of the cutting room. We were sorry to see him go since we all felt he was the head of our team, but he wanted to become a director, He followed his dream and became a damn good director." In 1937 he began his directorial career at Columbia Pictures, turning out low-budget B-Westerns starring Bob Baker, Charles Starrett, and Bill Elliott through 1940. Screenwriter Oliver Drake coined the nickname "Wagon-Wheel Joe," because of Lewis's tendency to use wagon wheels in certain scenes to create interesting visual compositions. "I carried a box with different wagon wheels," Lewis explained. "Whenever I'd come to a scene which was just disgraceful in dialogue and all, I'd place a wagon wheel in one portion of the frame and make an artistic shot of it, so by the time the scene was over you only saw the artistic value and couldn't analyze was the scene was about."

Lewis served with the United States Army Signal Corps as a Sergeant during World War II, making training films at the Army's Astoria Studios. One of these films, demonstrating how to shoot the M-1 rifle, was shown well into the 1960s.

Lewis was equally comfortable working in different genres: horror (Bela Lugosi, The Invisible Ghost), comedy (The East Side Kids, That Gang of Mine), detective mystery (Tom Conway, The Falcon in San Francisco), costume adventure (Larry Parks, The Swordsman), military (Russ Tamblyn, Retreat, Hell!), and musical (Benny Fields, Minstrel Man). Lewis's creative compositions for Minstrel Man won him the assignment of staging the musical sequences for The Jolson Story.

Today, Lewis is primarily known for his work in film noir during the 1940s and early 1950s. Gun Crazy is a dark romance about gun-obsession, notable for its use of location photography and, for film students and buffs, a particularly arresting shot which lasts for ten minutes, as the audience suddenly becomes a passenger in the getaway car following a bank robbery committed by the young leads.

Toward the end of Lewis's career, he worked in television, directing mostly westerns: The Rifleman, Bonanza, The Big Valley, Gunsmoke, and the pilot for Branded. He also directed the 1961 CBS crime adventure-drama series The Investigators.

Lewis suffered a major heart attack at the age of 46, but continued working until his 59th birthday in April 1966, at the end of the 1965–66 TV season. He later lectured at film schools and fan gatherings as well as at retrospectives such as the Telluride Film Festival, along with European venues in France, Germany and other locations. In 1997 he became the recipient of the Los Angeles Film Critics Association Lifetime Achievement Award.

Nearly five months after his 93rd birthday, Lewis died at his home in Los Angeles County's seaside community of Marina del Rey. Active until the end, he made his final public appearance five weeks earlier to introduce a screening of Gun Crazy at the University of California at Los Angeles. He was married to Buena Vista Lewis; they had one daughter, Candy Lewis Sangster.

== Selected filmography ==
- Courage of the West (1937)
- Navy Spy (1937)
- Border Wolves (1938)
- The Spy Ring (1938)
- The Singing Outlaw (1938)
- The Last Stand (1938)
- Boys of the City (1940)
- That Gang of Mine (1940)
- Pride of the Bowery (1940)
- Invisible Ghost (1941)
- Criminals Within (1941)
- The Mad Doctor of Market Street (1942)
- Bombs Over Burma (1943)
- Minstrel Man (1944)
- My Name Is Julia Ross (1945)
- The Falcon in San Francisco (1945)
- So Dark the Night (1946)
- The Jolson Story (1946, musical sequences only)
- The Swordsman (1948)
- The Return of October (1948)
- The Undercover Man (1949)
- Gun Crazy (1950)
- A Lady Without Passport (1950)
- Retreat, Hell! (1952)
- Desperate Search (1952)
- Cry of the Hunted (1953)
- The Big Combo (1955)
- A Lawless Street (1955)
- Man on a Bus (1955)
- 7th Cavalry (1956)
- The Halliday Brand (1957)
- Terror in a Texas Town (1958)
