= Fuzzy Knight =

American actor (1901–1976)

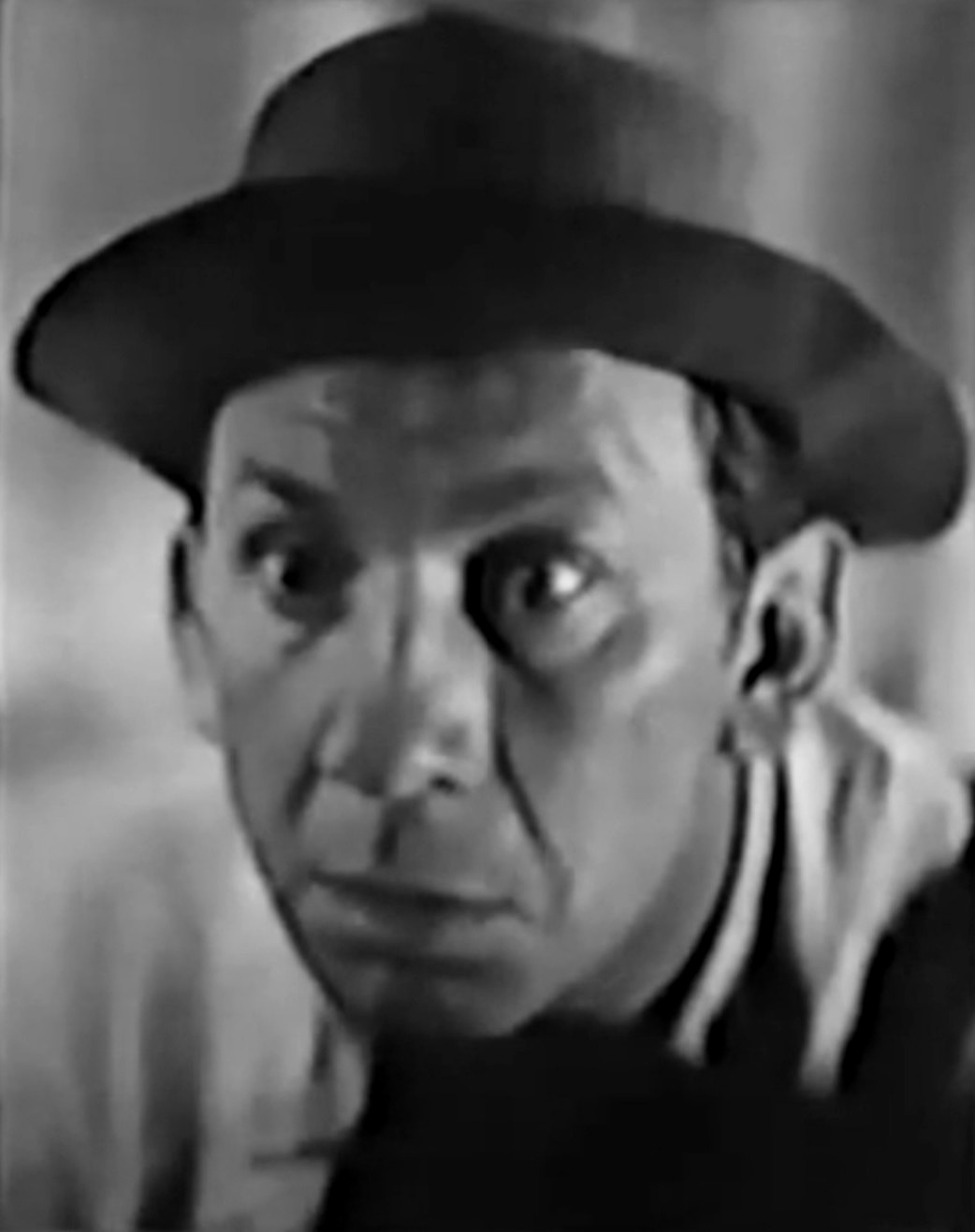
- Knight in Amateur Crook (1937)
- Born: John Forrest Knight; May 9, 1901; Fairmont, West Virginia, U.S.
- Died: February 23, 1976 (aged 74); Woodland Hills, Los Angeles, California, U.S.
- Resting place: Valhalla Memorial Park Cemetery
- Education: West Virginia University
- Occupation: Actor
- Years active: 1929–1967
- Spouse(s): Patricia Ryan (née Thelma de Long) (m. 19??)

John Forrest "Fuzzy" Knight (May 9, 1901 – February 23, 1976) was an American film and television actor. He was also a singer, especially in his early career. He appeared in more than 180 films between 1928 and 1967, usually as a cowboy hero's comic sidekick.

== Biography ==
Knight was born in Fairmont, West Virginia, the third child and son of James A. and Olive Knight. In Fairmont, he worked as a clerk at a hotel and played in a theater orchestra.

He attended nearby West Virginia University where he was a member of Sigma Nu fraternity, a cheerleader and law student. He wrote a pep song, "Fight Mountaineers," which is still frequently used by the Mountaineer Marching Band 90 years later. He also wrote the melody for a WVU song titled "To Thee Our Alma Mater," with words by fellow graduate David A. Christopher. He formed his own band in college and played drums, eventually leaving school to perform in vaudeville and in big bands such as Irving Aaronson's and George Olsen's.

Eventually his musical and comedy skills took him to New York, where he appeared in Earl Carroll's Vanities of 1927 and on Broadway in Here's Howe and Ned Wayburn's Gambols. He was billed under his nickname Fuzzy (given him because of his peculiarly soft voice).

While touring with bands, Knight came to Hollywood and appeared in several musical short films for MGM and Paramount between 1928 and 1932. Mae West gave him his first notable film role in She Done Him Wrong, and he went on to play in many dozens of films over the next 30 years. By the 1940s, he was primarily playing in Western movies and was voted one of the Top Ten Money-Making Stars in Westerns in 1940.

Knight became famous to a new generation when he co-starred as Buster Crabbe's sidekick (using his own name as Private Fuzzy Knight) on the 1955 television series Captain Gallant of the Foreign Legion. In semi-retirement thereafter, Knight continued to make occasional appearances in films and TV shows through 1967.

He died in his sleep at the Motion Picture Country House and Hospital in Woodland Hills, California, and was survived by his wife, actress Patricia Ryan (née Thelma de Long). He was buried in Valhalla Memorial Park Cemetery in Burbank, California.

== Filmography ==
Film
Year	Title	Role	Notes
1929	Night Parade	Party Guest	Uncredited
1932	Fighting For Justice	Playing himself	Song singer at piano
1932	Hell's Highway	Society Red	
1932	Vanity Street	Drunk	Uncredited
1932	Speed Demon	Lefty	
1933	The Billion Dollar Scandal	Piano Entertainer	Uncredited
1933	She Done Him Wrong	Rag Time Kelly	
1933	Under the Tonto Rim	Tex	
1933	Sunset Pass	Willy Willard	
1933	Her Bodyguard	Danny Dare	
1933	This Day and Age	Max	
1933	To the Last Man	Jeff Morley	
1933	Sitting Pretty	Stock Clerk	Uncredited
1934	Moulin Rouge	Eddie	
1934	Come On Marines!	Wimpy	
1934	The Last Round-Up	Charles Bunko McGee	
1934	I Hate Women	Cookie Smith	
1934	Operator 13	Pvt. Sweeney	
1934	The Cat's-Paw	Stuttering Gangster	
1934	The Girl from Missouri	Photographer with O'Sullivan	Uncredited
1934	Belle of the Nineties	Comedian	
1934	She Had to Choose	Wally	
1934	Behold My Wife!	Photographer	Uncredited
1934	Night Alarm	Dinner Club Comedian	
1934	Music in the Air	Nick	
1935	Home on the Range	Cracker	
1935	George White's 1935 Scandals	Sam Fogel	Uncredited
1935	Vagabond Lady	Swan - Man with Pat	Uncredited
1935	Dizzy Dames	Buzz	
1935	The Murder Man	'Buck' Hawkins	
1935	Danger Ahead	Fred Klein	Delicatessen Owner (singer/pianist)
1935	Trails of the Wild	Mountie Windy Cameron	
1935	Wanderer of the Wasteland	Deputy Scott	
1935	The Old Homestead	Lem	
1935	Hot Off the Press		
1935	Bars of Hate	Montague	
1935	Mary Burns, Fugitive	Dance hall attendant	
1936	The Trail of the Lonesome Pine	Tater	
1936	Song of the Trail	Pudge	
1936	Rio Grande Romance	Elmer	
1936	Palm Springs	Ranch Hand	Uncredited, off screen credit
1936	And Sudden Death	Steve Bartlett	
1936	Wildcat Trooper	Constable Pat O'Hearne - RCMP	
1936	Kelly of the Secret Service	Lefty Hogan	
1936	Sea Spoilers	Hogan	
1936	The Plainsman	Dave	
1936	Song of the Gringo	Zony	
1936	With Love and Kisses	Butch	
1936	Silks and Saddles	Bottsie Botsworth	
1937	Her Husband Lies	Ears Norris	Uncredited
1937	The Gold Racket	Scotty Summers	
1937	Mountain Justice	Clem Biggers	
1937	Mountain Music	Amos Burnside	
1937	Flying Fists	Spider	
1937	County Fair	Whitey the Trainer	
1937	Courage of the West	Hank Givens	First of four as the comic sidekick of Bob Baker
1937	Quick Money	Peter Piper Potter	
1937	Amateur Crook	Jape - Gas-Station Attendant	
1937	The Singing Outlaw	Longhorn	Second with Bob Baker
1938	Everybody's Doing It	Softy's Henchman	Uncredited
1938	Where the West Begins	Buzz - Jack's Sidekick	
1938	Border Wolves	Clem Barrett	
1938	The Last Stand	Pepper	
1938	Joy of Living	Sideshow Pianist & Singer	Uncredited
1938	Spawn of the North	Lefty Jones	
1938	The Cowboy and the Lady	Buzz	
1939	Union Pacific	Cookie	
1939	The Oregon Trail	Deadwood Hawkins	Serial
1939	Desperate Trails	Cousin Willie Strong	
1939	Oklahoma Frontier	Frosty	
1939	Chip of the Flying U	"Weary"	
1940	Remember the Night	Bandleader at Barn Dance	Uncredited
1940	West of Carson City	Banjo	
1940	My Little Chickadee	Cousin Zeb	
1940	Boss of Bullion City	Burt Pennypacker	
1940	Johnny Apollo	Cellmate	
1940	Riders of Pasco Basin	Luther	
1940	Bad Man from Red Butte	Spud	
1940	Son of Roaring Dan	Tick Belden	
1940	Brigham Young	Pete	
1940	Ragtime Cowboy Joe	Joe Bushberry	
1940	Law and Order	Deadwood	
1941	Bury Me Not on the Lone Prairie	Lem Fielding	
1941	Horror Island	Stuff Oliver	
1941	The Cowboy and the Blonde	Skeeter	
1941	Law of the Range	Chap	
1941	The Shepherd of the Hills	Mr. Palestrom	
1941	Rawhide Rangers	Porky Blake	
1941	Man from Montana	Deputy Grubby	
1941	Badlands of Dakota	Hurricane Harry	
1941	The Masked Rider	Patches McQuilt	
1941	New York Town	Gus Nelson	
1941	Arizona Cyclone	Muleshoe	
1941	Fighting Bill Fargo	Scoop	
1942	Stagecoach Buckaroo	Clem Clemmons	
1942	Butch Minds the Baby	Wyoming Bill	
1942	Juke Girl	Ike Harper	
1942	Lady in a Jam	Govt. Man's Cabbie	Uncredited
1942	The Silver Bullet	Wild Bill Jones	
1942	Boss of Hangtown Mesa	Dr. J. Wellington Dingle	
1942	Deep in the Heart of Texas	"Happy" T. Snodgras	
1942	Apache Trail	Juke	
1942	Little Joe, the Wrangler	Little Joe Smith	
1942	The Old Chisholm Trail	Alvin Pendergast	
1943	Tenting Tonight on the Old Camp Ground	Si Dugan	
1943	He's My Guy	Sparks	
1943	Cheyenne Roundup	Cal Calkins	
1943	Raiders of San Joaquin	Eustace Clairmont	
1943	Frontier Law	Ramblin' Rufe Randel	
1943	The Lone Star Trail	Angus MacAngus	
1943	Arizona Trail	'Kansas' Cobb	
1943	Corvette K-225	Cricket	
1944	Marshal of Gunsmoke	Glowworm Johnson	
1944	Oklahoma Raiders	Banjo Bonner	
1944	Hi, Good Lookin'!	Joe Smedley	
1944	The Great Alaskan Mystery	'Grit' Hartman	Serial, [Chs. 4-13]
1944	Cowboy and the Senorita	Fuzzy	
1944	Boss of Boomtown	Corporal 'Chatter' Box	
1944	Take It Big	Cowboy Joe	
1944	Trigger Trail	Echo	
1944	Allergic to Love	Charlie	
1944	Trail to Gunsight	Horatius Van Sickle	
1944	The Singing Sheriff	Fuzzy	
1944	Riders of the Santa Fe	Bullseye Johnson	
1944	The Old Texas Trail	H. Pinkerton 'Pinky' Pinkley	
1945	Frisco Sal	Hallelujah	
1945	Song of the Sarong	Pete McGillicutty	
1945	Beyond the Pecos	Barnacle Pete Finnegan	
1945	Swing Out, Sister	Clutch	
1945	Trail to Vengeance	Hungry Huggins	
1945	Renegades of the Rio Grande	Ranger Trigger Bidwell	Alternative title: Bank Robbery
1945	Bad Men of the Border	Mortimer P. Rockabye Jones	
1945	Code of the Lawless	Bonanza Featherstone	
1945	Senorita from the West	Rosebud	
1945	Frontier Gal	Fuzzy	
1946	Girl on the Spot	Bim	
1946	Gun Town	Ivory	
1946	Her Adventurous Night	Cudgeons	
1946	Lawless Breed	Tumbleweed	
1946	Rustler's Round-Up	Pinkerton J. 'Pinky' Pratt	
1946	Gunman's Code	Bosco O'Toole	
1947	The Egg and I	Cab Driver	
1948	Adventures of Gallant Bess	Woody	
1949	Down to the Sea in Ships	Lern Sykes	Uncredited
1949	Rimfire	Porky Hodges	
1949	Feudin' Rhythm	Horseshoe	
1949	Apache Chief	Sergeant Nevada	
1950	Hostile Country	Deacon Hall	
1950	Marshal of Heldorado	The Mayor	
1950	Crooked River	Deacon	
1950	Colorado Ranger	Deacon	
1950	Hills of Oklahoma	Jiggs Endicott	
1950	West of the Brazos	Judge Deacon	
1950	Fast on the Draw	Deacon	
1951	Dead or Alive	Texas - U. S. Marshal	
1951	Canyon Raiders	Texas Milburn	
1951	Skipalong Rosenbloom	Sneaky Pete	Alternative title: Square Shooter
1951	Nevada Badmen	Texas	
1951	Stagecoach Driver	Texas McGillicudy	
1951	Show Boat	Trocadero Piano Player	Uncredited
1951	Gold Raiders	Sheriff	
1951	Honeychile	Ice Cream Vendor	
1951	Lawless Cowboys	Horace Greeley Smithers	
1951	Stage to Blue River	Texas	
1952	Night Raiders	Tex	
1952	Rancho Notorious	The Barber	Uncredited
1952	Rodeo	Jazbo Davis	
1952	Oklahoma Annie	Larry	
1952	The Gunman	Blinkey	
1952	Kansas Territory	Cap	
1952	Fargo	Tad Sloan	
1952	Feudin' Fools	Traps	
1953	Topeka	Pop Harrison	
1953	Vigilante Terror	Strummer Jones	
1953	Geraldine	Song Plugger	Uncredited
1956	The Naked Hills	Pitch Man	
1958	The Notorious Mr. Monks	Tom	
1959	These Thousand Hills	Jacob Smith	Uncredited
1965	The Bounty Killer	Captain Luther	
1966	Waco	Telegraph Operator	
1967	Hostile Guns	Buck	
Television
Year	Title	Role	Notes
1950–1951	The Gene Autry Show	Sagebrush - Sidekick	4 episodes
1955–1957	Captain Gallant of the Foreign Legion	Pvt. Fuzzy Knight	33 episodes
1959	The Man and the Challenge	Burro Charlie	1 episode
1960	Outlaws	Isaac Miller	1 episode
1962	The Tall Man	Johnny Red	1 episode
1962	The Joey Bishop Show	Charles Porter	2 episodes
