= Honor of the Mounted =

Honor of the Mounted may refer to:

- The Honor of the Mounted, a 1914 American silent short drama film
- Honor of the Mounted (1932 film), an American pre-Code Western film
