= Willie Phelps =

American songwriter

- Born: September 5, 1914; Chesapeake, Virginia, U.S.
- Died: March 1, 2004 (aged 89)
- Occupations: Country and western guitarist, songwriter

Willie Thomas Phelps (September 5, 1914 – March 1, 2004) was an American songwriter and country and western guitarist.

== Biography ==
Phelps was born in Chesapeake, Virginia. He attended South Norfolk High School in Virginia.

Phelps performed with his brothers Norman and Earl as the Phelps Brothers, and as part of the Virginia Rounders. They also performed with Ray Whitley in the Six-Bar Cowboys. His songs were recorded by country artists such as Jim Reeves, and once by Elvis Presley. Phelps' songs featured in cowboy films in the 1930s. The three Phelps brothers had a screen appearance as Ray Whitley's cowboy band in Hittin' the Trail (1937), and Phelps' "Move Slow, Little Dogie" featured in the film The Renegade Ranger (1938). The Phelps brothers owned Fernwood Farms, a dance and concert venue in Norfolk County. He served in the United States Navy during World War II.

In 1961 he saluted Jimmie Rodgers (who died 1933) and Hank Williams (who died 1953) on an EP Willie Phelps Salutes Rodgers And Williams, with songs titled "Hank Williams Meets Jimmie Rodgers", "There's A New Star In Hillbilly Heaven", "Hank Williams Will Live Forever", and "So Long Pal Jimmie".

Phelps married Ruby Sutton and had four children. He died in 2004, at the age of 89.

== Selected songs ==
- Elvis Presley, "I'm Beginning to Forget You", Elvis: A Legendary Performer Volume 4 (1959)
- Jim Reeves, "The Merry Christmas Polka", Twelve Songs of Christmas (1963)
- Ernest Tubb, "When Jesus Calls", Stand by Me (1966)

== Discography ==
=== Phelps Brothers ===
- A: Were You Really Livin' / B: Playin' House

=== Willie Phelps ===
- A: I'm Beginning To Forget You / B: Do Anything But Leave Me (1957)
- A: I Got A Feelin' / B: Silver Box (1957)
- A: Someone's Gonna Get Hurt Now / B: All Too Soon They Grow Up (1966)
