= The Stranger from Arizona =

1938 film by Elmer Clifton

- Theatrical release poster
- Directed by: Elmer Clifton
- Story by: Monroe Shaff
- Produced by: Monroe Shaff
- Starring: Buck Jones; Dorothy Fay; Hank Mann; Hank Worden; Roy Barcroft; Bob Terry
- Cinematography: Edward Linden
- Edited by: Holbrook N. Todd
- Production company: Coronet Pictures
- Distributed by: Columbia Pictures
- Release date: September 22, 1938
- Running time: 55 minutes
- Country: United States
- Language: English

The Stranger from Arizona is a 1938 American Western film directed by Elmer Clifton and written by Monroe Shaff. The film stars Buck Jones, Dorothy Fay, Hank Mann, Hank Worden, Roy Barcroft and Bob Terry. The film was released on September 22, 1938, by Columbia Pictures.

== Cast ==
- Buck Jones as Buck Weylan
- Dorothy Fay as Ann Turner
- Hank Mann as Sam Garrison
- Hank Worden as Skeeter
- Roy Barcroft as Thane
- Bob Terry as Talbot
- Horace Murphy as Sheriff Trickett
- Budd Buster as Abner Trickett
- Dot Farley as Martha
- Walter Anthony as Sandy
- Stanley Blystone as Haskell
