= The Last Stand (1938 film) =

1938 film by Joseph H. Lewis

- Directed by: Joseph H. Lewis
- Screenplay by: Harry O. Hoyt; Norton S. Parker
- Story by: Harry O. Hoyt
- Produced by: Trem Carr
- Starring: Bob Baker
- Cinematography: Harry Neumann
- Edited by: Charles Craft
- Music by: Frank Sanucci
- Production company: Universal Pictures
- Release date: April 1, 1938 (USA)
- Running time: 56 min
- Country: United States
- Language: English

The Last Stand is a 1938 American Western film directed by Joseph H. Lewis. It is an early example of the western detective story.

== Cast ==
- Bob Baker, Tip Douglas the Laredo Kid
- Constance Moore, Nancy Drake
- Fuzzy Knight, Pepper
- Earle Hodgins, Thorn Evans
- Forrest Taylor, Turner
- Glenn Strange, Henchman Joe
- Sam Flint, as Calhourn
- Jimmy Phillips, Henchman Tom
- Jack Kirk Henchman Ed
