= The Renegade Ranger =

1938 film by David Howard

- Theatrical release poster
- Directed by: David Howard
- Written by: Bennett Cohen (story); Oliver Drake (screenplay)
- Produced by: Bert Gilroy (producer)
- Starring: George O'Brien; Rita Hayworth; Tim Holt; Ray Whitley
- Cinematography: Harry J. Wild
- Edited by: Frederic Knudtson
- Music by: Roy Webb
- Production company: RKO Radio Pictures, Inc.
- Release date: September 16, 1938
- Running time: 59 minutes (copyright length) (Turner library print)
- Country: United States
- Languages: English, Spanish

The Renegade Ranger is a 1938 American Western film directed by David Howard.

It was the first film Tim Holt made for RKO, for whom he would be one of the studio's biggest stars.

== Plot ==
Captain Jack Steele of the Texas Rangers is sent to arrest the beautiful Judith Alvarez. She claims she is innocent.

== Cast ==
- George O'Brien as Captain Jack Steele
- Rita Hayworth as Judith Alvarez
- Tim Holt as Larry Corwin
- Ray Whitley as Happy
- Lucio Villegas as Don Juan Campielo
- William Royle as Ben Sanderson
- Cecilia Callejo as Toñia Campielo
- Neal Hart as Sheriff Joe Rawlings
- Monte Montague as Henchman Monte
- Bob Kortman as Henchman Idaho
- Charles Stevens as Manuel
- Jim Mason as Hank
- Tom London as Henchman Red

== Production ==
RKO borrowed Rita Hayworth from Columbia Pictures for this production.
Scenes for the production were shot in Chatsworth, CA.

== Soundtrack ==
- "Señorita" (Music and lyrics by Albert Hay Malotte)
- Cecilia Callejo – "Cielito Lindo" (Traditional Mexican Ballad)
- Ray Whitley, Ken Card and The Phelps Brothers – "Move Slow, Little Dogie" (Music and lyrics by Willie Phelps)
