= West of Carson City =

- Theatrical release poster
- Directed by: Ray Taylor
- Screenplay by: Milton Raison; Sherman L. Lowe; Jack Bernhard
- Story by: Milton Raison
- Produced by: Joseph Gershenson
- Starring: Johnny Mack Brown; Bob Baker; Fuzzy Knight; Peggy Moran; Harry Woods; Robert Homans
- Cinematography: Jerome Ash
- Edited by: Ray Snyder
- Production company: Universal Pictures
- Distributed by: Universal Pictures
- Release date: January 19, 1940
- Running time: 57 minutes
- Country: United States
- Language: English

West of Carson City is a 1940 American Western film directed by Ray Taylor and written by Milton Raison, Sherman L. Lowe and Jack Bernhard. The film stars Johnny Mack Brown, Bob Baker, Fuzzy Knight, Peggy Moran, Harry Woods and Robert Homans. The film was released on January 19, 1940, by Universal Pictures.

== Plot ==
A judge leads a crusade against the illegitimate governing of a gold rush town by gamblers intent on cleaning out the prospectors. At the urging of some of the townsfolk, he does the cleaning out instead.

== Cast ==
- Johnny Mack Brown as Jim Bannister
- Bob Baker as Nevada
- Fuzzy Knight as Banjo
- Peggy Moran as Millie Harkins
- Harry Woods as Mack Gorman
- Robert Homans as Judge Harkins
- Al K. Hall as Lem Howard
- Roy Barcroft as Bill Tompkins
- Charles King as Drag
- Frank Mitchell as Breed
- Edmund Cobb as Sleepy
- Jack Roper as Larkin
- Ted Wells as Slim
- Jack Shannon as Pete
