= Hittin' the Trail =

1937 film

- Theatrical release poster
- Directed by: Robert N. Bradbury
- Written by: Robert Emmett Tansey
- Produced by: Edward Finney
- Starring: See below
- Cinematography: Gus Peterson
- Edited by: Frederick Bain
- Music by: Frank Sanucci
- Production companies: Boots and Saddle Pictures
- Distributed by: Grand National
- Release date: April 3, 1937
- Running time: 58 minutes
- Country: United States
- Language: English

Hittin' the Trail is a 1937 American Western film directed by Robert N. Bradbury. It stars singing cowboy Tex Ritter and Hank Worden.

== Plot ==
Penniless horse traders Tex and Hank meet a stranger in need of a horse. Though he has no money and the pair don't know who he is, when the stranger quotes "Cast your bread upon the waters, for you will find it after many days" from Ecclesiastes 11, they loan him one of their horses. Sheriff Grey accuses Tex of being the Tombstone Kid, the stranger who they loaned a horse to. The Sheriff doesn't believe they aren't criminals until they take them to town where saloon owner James Clark affirms that Tex is not the Tombstone Kid, whose gang is being held in jail as horse thieves.

Clark seeks to use Tex and Hank as a cover for his own gang stealing horses. Clark rigs the roulette wheel in his saloon where Tex wins on the money Clark loaned him; he agrees to buy a herd of horses from Clark to ride them to market, but Clark's gang sets the pair up as horse thieves.

== Cast ==
- Tex Ritter as Tex Randall
- Hank Worden (billed as Heber Snow) as Sidekick Hank
- Jerry Bergh as Jean Reed
- Tommy Bupp as Billy Reed
- Earl Dwire as James Clark
- Charles King as Henchman
- 'Snub' Pollard as Bartender
- Ed Cassidy as Sheriff Grey
- Jack C. Smith as Dad Reed
- Archie Ricks as Tombstone Kid
- Ray Whitley as Musician
- The Range Ramblers as Ray Whitley's Band
- Earl Phelps as Musician, Ray Whitley's Range Ramblers
- Norman Phelps as Musician, Ray Whitley's Range Ramblers
- Willie Phelps as Musician, Ray Whitley's Range Ramblers
- Ken Card as Banjo player, Ray Whitley's Range Ramblers
- The Texas Tornadoes as 2nd Band Group
- White Flash as Tex's Horse

== Soundtrack ==
- Tex Ritter and Hank Worden - "Hittin' the Trail" (Written by Harry Miller)
- Tommy Bupp - "I'm a Rippin' Snortin' Sheriff" (Written by Robert N. Bradbury and Lindsley Parsons)
- Tex Ritter - "Blood on the Saddle" (Written by Everett Cheatham)
- Ray Whitley and His Range Ramblers - "Ridin' the Old Prairie Trail" (Written by Ray Whitley)
- Ray Whitley and His Range Ramblers - "Texas Washboard Rag" (Written by Ray Whitley)
- Tex Ritter - "Headin' For Town" (Written by Frank Sanucci)
- Tex Ritter and the posse riders - "The Vagabond Song" aka "The Renegade Song" (Written by Glenn Strange)
- Tex Ritter - "I'm A Natural Born Cowboy" (Written by Rudy Sooter)
