= Border Wolves =

1938 film by Joseph H. Lewis

- Theatrical release poster
- Directed by: Joseph H. Lewis
- Screenplay by: Norton S. Parker
- Story by: Norton S. Parker
- Produced by: Trem Carr
- Starring: Bob Baker; Constance Moore; Fuzzy Knight; Dick Jones; Willie Fung; Oscar O'Shea; Frank Campeau
- Cinematography: Harry Neumann
- Edited by: Charles Craft
- Music by: Frank Sanucci
- Production company: Universal Pictures
- Distributed by: Universal Pictures
- Release date: February 25, 1938
- Running time: 56 minutes
- Country: United States
- Language: English

Border Wolves is a 1938 American Western film directed by Joseph H. Lewis and written by Norton S. Parker. The film stars Bob Baker, Constance Moore, Fuzzy Knight, Dick Jones, Willie Fung, Oscar O'Shea and Frank Campeau. The film was released on February 25, 1938, by Universal Pictures.

== Plot ==
Rusty Reynolds and his partner Clem Barrett are heading to California, but then come upon a wagon train massacre and arrested by mistake. They are sentenced to hang, but on the night before the execution, they are released by the Judge that gave them their sentence since he knows they are innocent and that the real culprit is his son.

== Cast ==
- Bob Baker as Rusty Reynolds
- Constance Moore as Mary Jo Benton
- Fuzzy Knight as Clem Barrett
- Dick Jones as Jimmie Benton
- Willie Fung as Ling Wong
- Oscar O'Shea as Judge Coleman
- Frank Campeau as Tom Dawson
- Glenn Strange as Deputy Joe O'Connell
- Ed Cassidy as Valley Falls Sheriff Haight
- Jack Montgomery as MacKay
- Dick Dorrell as Jack Carson aka Jack Coleman
