= Brigham Young (film) =

1940 film directed by Henry Hathaway

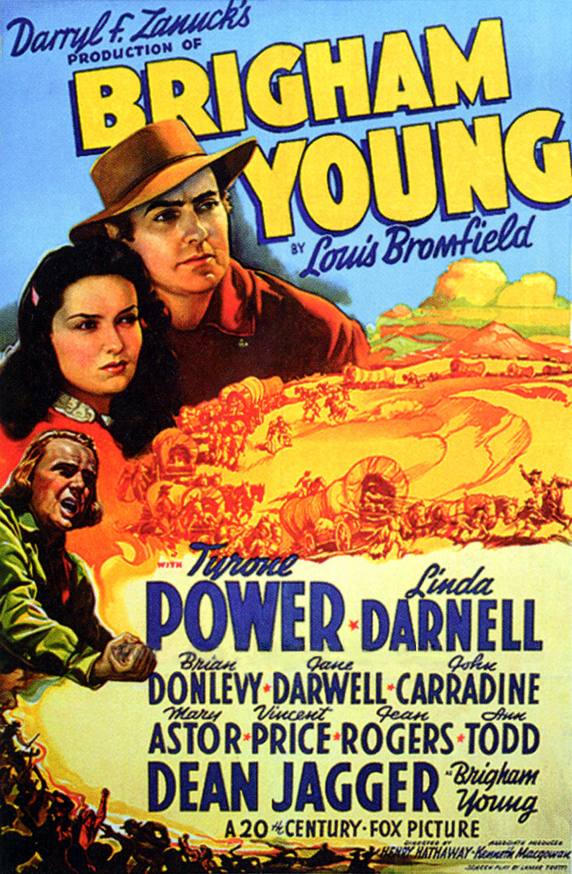
- 1940 theatrical release poster
- Directed by: Henry Hathaway
- Written by: Louis Bromfield
- Screenplay by: Lamar Trotti
- Produced by: Kenneth Macgowan (associate producer)
- Starring: Tyrone Power; Linda Darnell; Brian Donlevy; Jane Darwell; John Carradine; Mary Astor; Vincent Price; Jean Rogers; Ann Todd; Dean Jagger
- Cinematography: Arthur Miller, A.S.C.
- Edited by: Robert Bischoff
- Music by: Alfred Newman; Robert Russell Bennett (uncredited); David Buttolph (uncredited); Cyril J. Mockridge (uncredited)
- Production company: Twentieth Century-Fox Film Corporation
- Distributed by: 20th Century Fox
- Release date: September 27, 1940
- Running time: 114 minutes
- Country: United States
- Language: English
- Budget: $2.5 million

Brigham Young (also known as Brigham Young – Frontiersman) is a 1940 American biographical historical drama Western film starring Tyrone Power, Linda Darnell and Dean Jagger that describes Young's succession to the presidency of the Church of Jesus Christ of Latter-day Saints after founder Joseph Smith was assassinated in 1844. The supporting cast features Brian Donlevy, Jane Darwell, John Carradine, Mary Astor, Vincent Price, Jean Rogers and Ann Todd.

== Plot ==
In frontier-town Nauvoo, Illinois, in 1844, the main body of the church are forced to leave Illinois, choosing to settle temporarily in Nebraska. They then travel by wagon train to the Great Basin.

== Cast ==
- Tyrone Power as Jonathan Kent, the Mormon Scout
- Linda Darnell as Zina Webb, the Outsider
- Dean Jagger as Brigham Young
- Brian Donlevy as Angus Duncan
- Jane Darwell as Eliza Kent
- John Carradine as Porter Rockwell
- Mary Astor as Mary Ann Young
- Vincent Price as Joseph Smith
- Jean Rogers as Clara Young
- Ann Todd as Mary Kent
- Willard Robertson as Heber Kimball
- Moroni Olsen as Doc Richards
- Marc Lawrence as Prosecutor
- Stanley Andrews as Hyrum Smith
- Frank Thomas as Hubert Crum
- Fuzzy Knight as Pete
- Dickie Jones as Henry Kent
- Selmer Jackson as Caleb Kent
- Frederick Burton as Mr. Webb
- Arthur Aylesworth as Jim Bridger
- Chief Big Tree as Big Elk
- Davidson Clark as Johnson
- Claire DuBrey as Emma Smith
- Tully Marshall as Judge
- Dick Rich as Mob Leader
- Ralph Dunn as Jury Foreman
- Edwin Maxwell as Leader
- Edmund MacDonald as Elder
- George Melford as John Taylor
- Russell Simpson as Major

Uncredited (in order of appearance)
Lee Shumway	member of anti-Smith mob
Charles Middleton	member of anti-Smith mob
William Haade	skeptic at Mormon trial
Blackie Whiteford	courtroom spectator
Murdock MacQuarrie	courtroom spectator
Charles Halton	prosecutor at Mormon trial
Eddy Waller	man announcing discovery of gold
Paul E. Burns	man discussing gold rush
Frank Shannon	man discussing gold rush
Edmund Elton	man reacting to excitement regarding gold rush
Herbert Heywood	man joking about California gold rush
David Kirkland	Mormon elder
Frank Mills	agitator in newspaper office
Cliff Clark	Mormon disputing Brigham Young
Bob Kortman	Mormon disputing Brigham Young
Hank Worden	Mormon supporting Brigham Young
Jody Gilbert	heavyset woman caught in current during river crossing
Tom London	member of raiding group attacking Mormons

== Cast notes ==
Ninth-billed Jean Rogers played Dale Arden in the 1936 serial Flash Gordon and its 1938 follow-up Flash Gordon's Trip to Mars. Her co-stars in the two serials, Charles Middleton, who played Ming the Merciless and Frank Shannon, who played Dr. Zarkov, have uncredited bit parts in this film.

== Production ==
Parts of the film were shot in Lone Pine, California, in the plains west of Parowan Gap, and in Utah Lake for the seagull scenes. The Salt Lake City sequences were filmed in California, while the trek across Nebraska and Wyoming was shot in southern Utah.

== Reception ==
Michael and Harry Medved included Brigham Young in their 1984 book describing film financial failures, The Hollywood Hall of Shame, stating "Twentieth Century-Fox tried to emphasize its star power and to downplay the religious elements (eventually re-titling it Brigham Young, Frontiersman), but the picture still failed, even in Utah."

== See also ==
- List of American films of 1940
- George D. Pyper
