= So You Won't Talk (1940 film) =

1940 film directed by Edward Sedgwick

- Lobby card for the film
- Directed by: Edward Sedgwick
- Written by: Richard Flournoy
- Produced by: Robert Sparks
- Starring: Joe E. Brown; Frances Robinson; Vivienne Osborne
- Cinematography: Allen Siegler
- Edited by: James Sweeney
- Music by: M. W. Stoloff
- Production company: Columbia Pictures
- Release date: October 4, 1940 (US)
- Running time: 68 minutes
- Country: United States
- Language: English

So You Won't Talk is a 1940 comedy directed by Edward Sedgwick, which stars Joe E. Brown in a dual role, along with Frances Robinson and Vivienne Osborne.

== Cast ==
- Joe E. Brown as "Whiskers" (Charles Augustus Holt)/Brute Hanson
- Frances Robinson as (Lucy Walters)
- Vivienne Osborne as (Maxie Carewe)
- Bernard Nedell as (Bugs Linaker)
- Tom Dugan as (Dude)
- Dick Wessel as (Dopey)
- Anthony Warde as (Dolf)

== Reception ==
The Film Daily only rated the film as "fair", observing "The situations are generally amusing, but they lack the zip and power which spells concerted comedy and occasional belly-laughs." The magazine faulted the script mostly, saying that Sedgwick's "... direction keeps matters moving as best he can considering that the script and gags are none too strong or original." The felt that Brown's fans would appreciate his performance, as it was what they would expect, particularly pointing out the solid performance of Robinson. Motion Picture Daily was kinder to the film, calling it the funniest film Brown had made since Elmer, the Great. They felt the picture had "considerable hilarity", and complimented the direction of Sedgwick, as well as the work of the supporting cast. The Motion Picture Herald also enjoyed the picture, again calling the film the best in Brown's career since Elmer, the Great. They also felt that direction of Sedgewick, the production of Sparks, and the screenplay by Flournoy were all done well.
