= Bloodhounds of the North =

1913 film by Allan Dwan

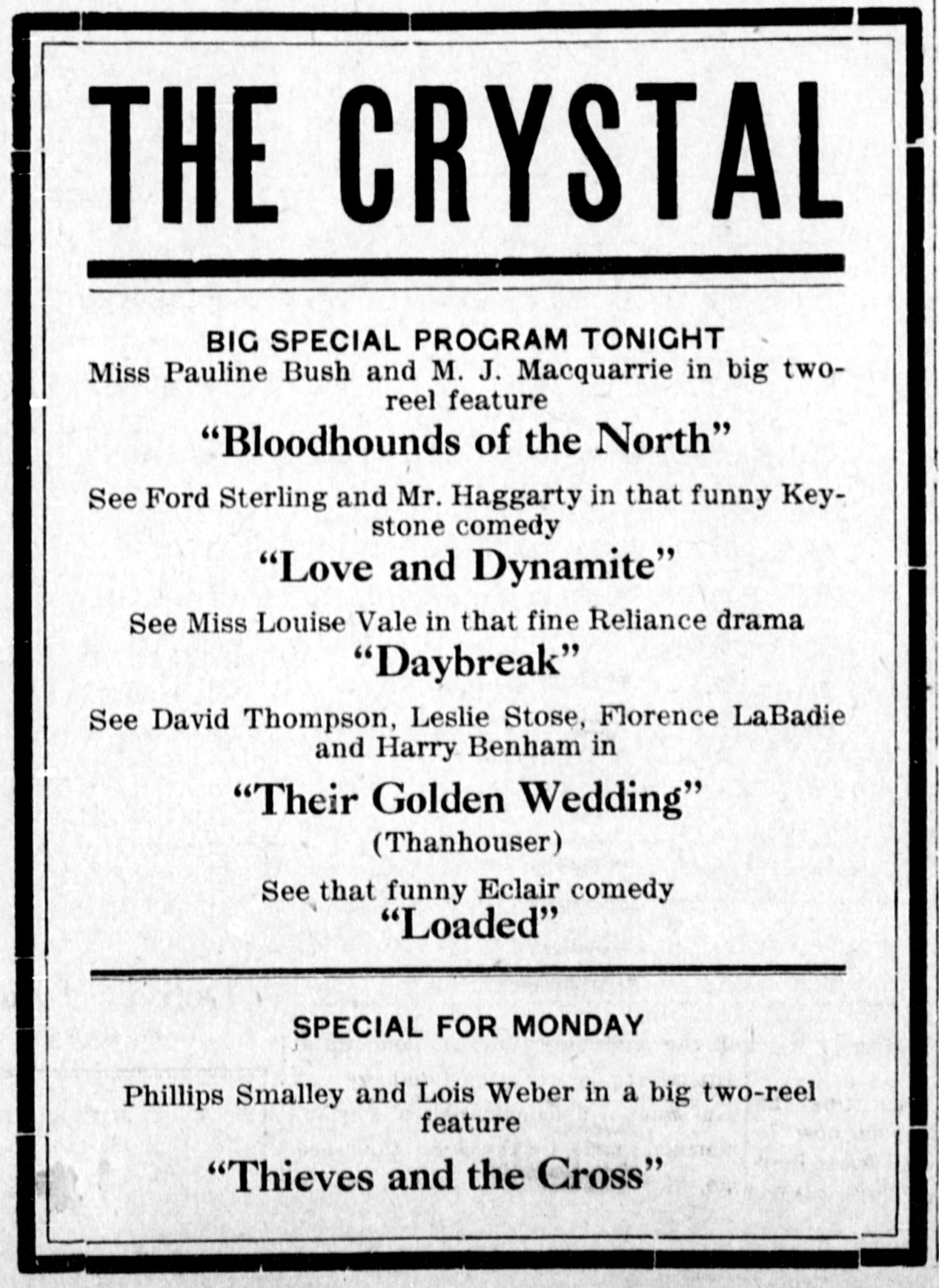
- A contemporary advertisement for the film and several other films.
- Directed by: Allan Dwan
- Written by: Arthur Rosson
- Starring: Murdock MacQuarrie; Pauline Bush; Lon Chaney
- Distributed by: Universal Film Manufacturing Company
- Release date: December 23, 1913
- Running time: 20 minutes (2 reels)
- Country: United States
- Languages: Silent; English intertitles

Bloodhounds of the North is a 1913 American silent short drama film directed by Allan Dwan and starring Murdock MacQuarrie, Pauline Bush, and Lon Chaney. The film is now considered lost. Some sources state the film was edited down to one reel and re-released theatrically in 1916 as Accusing Evidence, but this is disputed.

== Plot ==
A colony of refugees in the Canadian mountains are wanted by the police for various crimes. One day, a man sought for embezzlement arrives at the colony with his daughter, Pauline. The embezzler is crafty and a natural born leader, and thus takes over leadership of the colony from James, the former leader. Two Mounties, Lon and Mac, are on the trail of the embezzler who sets up an ambush for the Mounties. Mac is wounded and Pauline takes him to her cabin to care for him. Lon learns that Pauline's father is the embezzler they are looking for. Lon makes amorous advances to her, but Mac saves her because he has fallen in love with her. Mac learns that Pauline's father is the embezzler and he demands that James surrender him. As the man is arrested, Pauline pleads with Lon to let her father go. Lon lifts his revolver to shoot Mac, but the refugees shoot Lon instead, and Pauline's father is also killed by the gunfire. Just as they are about to kill Mac, a third Mountie arrives to save him. Pauline and Mac decide to make a new life together.

== Cast ==
- Murdock MacQuarrie as Mac, A Mountie
- Lon Chaney as Lon, A Mountie
- William Lloyd as The Embezzler
- Pauline Bush as Pauline, The Embezzler's Daughter
- James Neill as James
- Allan Forrest as Undetermined Role (uncredited)

== Production notes ==
The film was shot on location in Mount Lowe, California. Director Allan Dwan also shot The Honor of the Mounted (also starring Murdock MacQuarrie, Pauline Bush, and Lon Chaney) at the same time. During filming, Lon Chaney and Arthur Rosson got lost in a canyon and were not located by a rescue team until the end of the day. The cast and crew were also stranded in their cabins for five days due to heavy rains. Dwan had the cast rehearse for an upcoming film, Richelieu, in an effort to save time.

== Reception ==
"The Moving Picture World" opined: "This 2-reel drama gives a good account of the Canadian Mounted Police, the romantic and adventurous constabulary of the Northwest woods... Some splendid woods and mountain settings occur."
