= Oklahoma Terror =

1939 film

- Directed by: Spencer Gordon Bennet
- Written by: Lindsley Parsons (story); George Waggner (screenplay)
- Produced by: Lindsley Parsons (producer)
- Starring: See below
- Cinematography: Bert Longenecker
- Edited by: Robert Golden
- Release date: 1939
- Running time: 50 minutes
- Country: United States
- Language: English

Oklahoma Terror is a 1939 American Western film directed by Spencer Gordon Bennet.

== Cast ==
- Addison Randall as Jack Ridgely
- Al St. John as "Fuzzy" Glass
- Virginia Carroll as Helen Martin
- Don Rowan as Slade
- Davison Clark as Cartwright
- Glenn Strange as Ross Haddon
- Tristram Coffin as Mason
- Warren McCollum as Don Martin
- Ralph Peters as Reb Nelson
- Nolan Willis as Henchman Yucca Woodridge
- Rusty as Rusty, Jack's Horse
