= The Fighting Texan =

1937 film directed by Charles Abbott

- Theatrical release poster
- Directed by: Charles Abbott
- Screenplay by: Joseph O'Donnell
- Based on: Tragedy That Lived by James Oliver Curwood
- Produced by: Maurice Conn
- Starring: Kermit Maynard; Elaine Shepard; Frank LaRue; Budd Buster; Ed Cassidy; Murdock MacQuarrie; Art Miles; Bruce Mitchell
- Cinematography: Jack Greenhalgh
- Edited by: Richard G. Wray
- Production company: Conn Pictures Corporation
- Distributed by: Ambassador Pictures
- Release date: June 1, 1937
- Running time: 58 minutes
- Country: United States
- Language: English

The Fighting Texan is a 1937 American Western film directed by Charles Abbott and written by Joseph O'Donnell. The film stars Kermit Maynard, Elaine Shepard, Frank LaRue, Budd Buster, Ed Cassidy, Murdock MacQuarrie, Art Miles and Bruce Mitchell. The film was released on June 1, 1937, by Ambassador Pictures.

== Plot ==
The story follows rancher Glenn Oliver, who has been noticing a decrease in his horse population, while a nearby ranch is getting more and more horses.

== Cast ==
- Kermit Maynard as Glenn Oliver
- Elaine Shepard as Judy Walton
- Frank LaRue as Joe Walton
- Budd Buster as Old-timer
- Ed Cassidy as Pete Hadley
- Murdock MacQuarrie as Jim Perkins
- Art Miles as Carter
- Bruce Mitchell as Sheriff Bert Winder
- Bob Woodward as Bob

== Critical reception ==
Variety described the film as a "moderate western" and commented that the likelihood of box office success was "slim, except in those localities where the patrons just don't care."
