= Forbidden Valley (film) =

1938 film directed by Wyndham Gittens

- Theatrical release poster
- Directed by: Wyndham Gittens
- Screenplay by: Wyndham Gittens
- Based on: The Mountains Are My Kingdom by Stuart Hardy
- Produced by: Henry McRae; Elmer Tambert
- Starring: Noah Beery Jr. Frances Robinson; Robert Barrat; Fred Kohler; Alonzo Price; Samuel S. Hinds
- Cinematography: Elwood Bredell
- Edited by: Frank Gross
- Music by: Charles Previn
- Production company: Universal Pictures
- Distributed by: Universal Pictures
- Release date: February 13, 1938
- Running time: 68 minutes
- Country: United States
- Language: English

Forbidden Valley is a 1938 American action film written and directed by Wyndham Gittens. It is based on the 1937 novel The Mountains Are My Kingdom by Stuart Hardy. The film stars Noah Beery Jr., Frances Robinson, Robert Barrat, Fred Kohler, Alonzo Price and Samuel S. Hinds. The film was released on February 13, 1938, by Universal Pictures.

== Plot ==
Ring Hazzard was raised alone by his father in a secret valley, until one day he saves a girl from a wild horse stampede, his father is killed in the stampede and Ring and the girl head to the town of Gunsight to sell some mustangs Ring captured.

== Cast ==
- Noah Beery Jr. as Ring Hazzard
- Frances Robinson as Wilda Lanning
- Robert Barrat as Ramrod Locke
- Fred Kohler as Matt Rogan
- Alonzo Price as Indian Joe
- Samuel S. Hinds as Jeff Hazzard
- Stanley Andrews as Hoke Lanning
- Spencer Charters as Dr. Scudd
- Charles Stevens as Blackjack
- Soledad Jiménez as Meetah
- Margaret McWade as Mrs. Scudd
- Henry Hunter as Bagley
- John Ridgely as Duke Lafferty
- James Foran as Brandon
- Ferris Taylor as Sheriff Walcott
