= Prairie Justice =

1938 film by George Waggner

- Theatrical release poster
- Directed by: George Waggner
- Written by: George Waggner
- Produced by: Trem Carr
- Starring: Bob Baker, Dorothy Fay, Hal Taliaferro
- Cinematography: Gus Peterson
- Music by: Frank Sanucci
- Production company: Universal Studios
- Release date: November 4, 1938 (USA)
- Running time: 58 minutes
- Country: United States
- Language: English

Prairie Justice is a 1938 American Western "B" movie directed by George Waggner and starring Bob Baker as a singing cowboy.

== Plot ==
Baker plays an undercover marshall investigating a series of stage coach robberies. After his father is killed, he determines to get justice, pretending to be a drifter while gradually gathering clues to the identify of the killers. Early in the story Bob meets Anita, who is trying to save her ranch after all her cattle have been stolen. Bob woes Anita with his guitar. Finally he goes after the bad guys in a shoot-out. After justice had been done, Anita agrees to marry Bob.

== Cast ==
- Bob Baker as U.S. Marshal Bob Randall
- Dorothy Fay as Anita Benson
- Hal Taliaferro as Alfalfa
- Jack Rockwell as John Benson
- Forrest Taylor as Sheriff Pop Randall
- Carleton Young as Dry-Gulch Baker
- Glenn Strange as Hank Haynes (Express Agent)
- Jack Kirk as Henchman Boots
- Dick Dickinson as Committeeman Doc (uncredited)
- George Hazel as Townsman (uncredited)
- Murdock MacQuarrie as Stage Line Agent (uncredited)
- Slim Whitaker as Bert – Stage Guard (uncredited)

== Production ==
Director George Waggner wrote the script, using the pseudonym Joseph West. Fleming Allen wrote several of the songs, including "Starlight on the Prairie", "40 Miles From Water", "High Falutin' Cowboy" and "Trailin' My Way To You". Dorothy Fay, who shortly after filming ended married Tex Ritter, another singing cowboy, provides the love interest. The film is one of the first to introduce a faithful dog as the cowboy's companion.

== Critical reception ==
One reviewer said of Baker's performance: "Baker has good looks, a pleasing personality, and seems to have the intelligence to do better acting than most of the western heroes." Another said, "Baker is so overconfident in this role, it hurts, but then, this was just one of 10 films he made in 1938."

== Notes and references ==
Citations

Bibliography

- Smith, M. P., ed. (1973). "Bob Baker". Western Film Collector. Western Film Collectors.
- Nash, Jay Robert; Ross, Stanley Ralph (1986). The Motion Picture Guide. Vol. 6. Cinebooks.
