= Oklahoma Frontier =

- Theatrical release poster
- Directed by: Ford Beebe
- Screenplay by: Ford Beebe
- Produced by: Albert Ray
- Starring: Johnny Mack Brown; Bob Baker; Fuzzy Knight; Anne Gwynne; James Blaine; Bob Kortman
- Cinematography: Jerome Ash
- Edited by: Louis Sackin
- Production company: Universal Pictures
- Distributed by: Universal Pictures
- Release date: October 10, 1939
- Running time: 59 minutes
- Country: United States
- Language: English

Oklahoma Frontier is a 1939 American Western film written and directed by Ford Beebe. The film stars Johnny Mack Brown, Bob Baker, Fuzzy Knight, Anne Gwynne, James Blaine and Bob Kortman. The film was released on October 10, 1939, by Universal Pictures.

== Cast ==
- Johnny Mack Brown as Jeff McLeod
- Bob Baker as Tom Rankin
- Fuzzy Knight as Windy Day
- Anne Gwynne as Janet Rankin
- James Blaine as George Frazier
- Bob Kortman as J. W. Saunders
- Charles King as Soapy
- Harry Tenbrook as Grimes
- Lane Chandler as Sergeant
- Horace Murphy as Mushy
- Lloyd Ingraham as Judge
- Joe De La Cruz as Cheyenne
- Anthony Warde as Wayne
