= The Singing Outlaw =

1938 film by Joseph H. Lewis

- Theatrical release poster
- Directed by: Joseph H. Lewis
- Written by: Harry O. Hoyt
- Produced by: Trem Carr
- Starring: Bob Baker; Joan Barclay; Fuzzy Knight
- Cinematography: Virgil Miller
- Edited by: Charles Craft
- Music by: Frank Sanucci
- Production company: Universal Studios
- Release date: January 23, 1938 (USA)
- Running time: 57 minutes
- Country: United States
- Language: English

The Singing Outlaw is a 1938 American "B" movie Western film directed by Joseph H. Lewis and starring Bob Baker as a singing cowboy.

== Plot ==
A singing outlaw named Cueball and a U.S. Marshal kill each other in a shoot-out and a bystander decides to take over the Marshall's identity. To trap the local outlaw gang he pretends to be Cueball. He finds himself struggling to stop the cattle rustlers and win the love of the daughter of a rancher. Things get complicated when a sheriff captures him with the gang, and he nearly gets hanged before it is proved that he is not Cueball.

== Production ==
The film was the third that Lewis had directed, after Navy Spy (1937), which he co-directed with Crane Wilbur and Courage of the West. This was the second of four films in which Fuzzy Knight played the comic sidekick to Universal's new singing cowboy, Bob Baker.

== Reception ==
A reviewer said, "The second of Baker's outings as a singing cowboy is notable for Miller's exceptional camera work and Lewis' emphatic direction."

== Notes and references ==
Citations

Sources

- Beatty, Josh; England, John; Halperin, James L. (October 1, 2005). Heritage Vintage Movie Poster Signature Auction 2005 Catalog #624. Heritage Capital Corporation. p. 30. ISBN 978-1-59967-004-1.
- Hardy, Phil (1983). "The Singing Outlaw". The encyclopedia of western movies. Octopus. ISBN 978-0-7064-2555-0.
- McClure, Arthur F.; Jones, Ken D. (1972). Heroes, heavies and sagebrush: a pictorial history of the "B" western players. A. S. Barnes. ISBN 978-0-498-07787-6.
- "The Singing Outlaw (1937)". IMDB.
- Thomson, David (December 18, 2008). The New Biographical Dictionary of Film: Expanded and Updated. Random House Digital, Inc. p. 1650. ISBN 978-0-307-48868-8.
