= Fighting for Justice =

1932 film

- Film poster
- Directed by: Otto Brower
- Written by: Gladwell Richardson (story); Robert Quigley (screenplay)
- Starring: Tim McCoy and Joyce Compton
- Cinematography: Ernest Miller
- Edited by: Otto Meyer
- Distributed by: Columbia Pictures
- Release date: August 28, 1932
- Running time: 60 minutes
- Country: USA
- Language: English

Fighting for Justice is a 1932 American Pre-Code Western film, directed by Otto Brower. It stars Tim McCoy and Joyce Compton.

The Library of Congress has a copy of this feature.

== Cast ==
- Tim McCoy - Tim Keane
- Joyce Compton - Amy Tracey
- Robert Frazer - Raney
- William V. Mong - Gafford
- Hooper Atchley - Trent
- Henry Sedley - Bull Barnard
- Harry Todd - Cooky
- Lafe McKee - Sam Tracey
- William N. Bailey - Colorado
- Harry Cording -
- Murdock MacQuarrie - Sheriff
- Walter Brennan - Zeke
