= The Phantom Stage =

1939 film

- Theatrical release poster
- Directed by: George Waggner
- Written by: George Waggner
- Produced by: Trem Carr
- Starring: Bob Baker; Marjorie Reynolds; George Cleveland; Forrest Taylor
- Cinematography: Harry Neumann
- Edited by: Charles Craft, Carl Pierson
- Music by: Frank Sanucci
- Production company: Universal Studios
- Release date: January 1, 1939 (USA)
- Running time: 58 minutes
- Country: United States
- Language: English

The Phantom Stage is a 1939 American musical Western film – a "B" movie – directed by George Waggner and starring Bob Baker as a singing cowboy.

== Plot ==
Bob Carson and his sidekick Grizzly hear that a stagecoach owned by Mary is being mysteriously robbed of gold shipments. The gold is placed in the strongbox, but has vanished when the stagecoach arrives at its destination. Carson takes on the job of driving the stage. It turns out that a local bad guy has a small accomplice who hides in a case that is shipped on the stage, and slips out to steal the gold from the strongbox during the journey, then retreats to the case. At the other end, the case is taken away but the strongbox is empty. Carson works out the trick, hides in the case, is discovered, escapes, and the villain is captured. With the problem solved, Carson marries Mary.

== Production ==
The Phantom Stage was the last of Universal's singing cowboy movies featuring Bob Baker.

== Reception ==
A reviewer said of the gold theft approach, "... this plot element is handled in so ludicrous a manner that Bob Baker's musical interludes actually come as a relief!"

== Sources ==
- "The Phantom Stage". Turner Classic Movies. Time Warner. Archived from the original on March 4, 2016.
- "The Phantom Stage – Synopsis". Fandango.
- "The Phantom Stage (1939)". IMDB.
