= Desperate Trails (1939 film) =

1939 film

- Directed by: Albert Ray
- Starring: Johnny Mack Brown
- Production company: Universal Pictures
- Release date: October 1, 1939
- Running time: 1 h
- Country: United States
- Language: English

Desperate Trails is a 1939 American Western film directed by Albert Ray. It was the first of a series of 28 films by Universal Pictures with Brown in the lead role.

== Cast ==
- Johnny Mack Brown - Steve Hayden
- Bob Baker - Clem Waters
- Fuzzy Knight - Cousin Willie Strong
- Frances Robinson - Judith Lantry
- Russell Simpson - Sheriff Big Bill Tanner
- Clarence Wilson - Malenkthy Culp
- Charles Stevens - Henchman Ortega
- Ralph Dunn - Henchman Lon
