= Bob Baker (actor) =

American actor and singer (1910–1975)

- Baker in c. 1939
- Born: Stanley Leland Weed; November 8, 1910; Forest City, Iowa, US
- Died: August 29, 1975 (aged 64); Prescott, Arizona, US
- Occupations: Actor, singer
- Known for: Singing cowboy in films

Bob Baker (born Stanley Leland Weed; November 8, 1910 – August 29, 1975) was an American singer who had several starring roles as a singing cowboy in the late 1930s, in Hollywood films.

== Early years ==
The son of Guy Weed and Ethel Leland Weed, Unlike most movie cowboys, Baker really worked as a cowboy in his youth, and was a rodeo champion when he was sixteen.

== Early career ==
Baker began singing professionally at the age of twenty, for the KTSM radio station in El Paso, Texas. In Chicago he spent several months with WLS. As a professional rodeo roper and rider, he competed in Cheyenne, Wyoming, Pendleton, Oregon, and Salinas, California, among other sites.

== Film career ==
Baker won a Universal Studios screen test in 1937 in competition against Leonard Slye (Roy Rogers), and became the studio's lead singing cowboy. Known as "Tumbleweed" Baker, he starred in a dozen pictures before suffering an injury and being demoted to secondary roles. He performed many of his own stunts. Baker starred in the "B" Western Courage of the West (1937) with Lois January. She said, "Bob Baker was too pretty! He was nice, but didn't get friendly. He didn't want me to sing a song in his picture. That business is full of jealousy...". This movie, his first, was thought to be his best. The others suffered from predictable plots and poor scripts.

Fuzzy Knight worked with Baker as a sidekick on his first four films. Starting with The Last Stand (1938) Baker rode Apache, a pinto he had bought in Arizona. A well-trained horse, Apache tolerated his signature trick of vaulting over the horse's rear into the saddle. Between work on the sets, Baker had to tour and perform at movie theatres, in part to promote the pictures and in part to earn extra income. Bob Baker accompanied his singing with a Gibson Advanced Jumbo guitar. He did not make any recordings.

In a poll of 1939, Baker was one of the top money-making Western stars. However, he did not have the star quality of a performer like Gene Autry.

In the 1940s, Baker's work in films was limited to performing stunts in films that included Gung Ho (1943), Phantom Lady, (1944), and Ali Baba and the Forty Thieves (1944).

== Later years ==
After leaving the movie industry Baker served again in the army in World War II. He then became a member of the police force of Flagstaff, Arizona. He later ran a dude ranch and became an expert in leather crafts.

== Death ==
Baker had a series of heart attacks toward the end of his life and died of a stroke on August 29, 1975.

== Films ==
Year	Star?	Title	Role	Notes
1937	*	Courage of the West	Jack Saunders	
1937	*	The Singing Outlaw	Bob 'Scrap' Gordon	
1938	*	Border Wolves	Rusty Reynolds	
1938		The Last Stand	Tip Douglas posing as the Laredo Kid	
1938	*	Western Trails	Bob Mason	
1938	*	Outlaw Express	Captain Bob Bradley	
1938	*	Black Bandit	Sheriff Bob Ramsay / Don Ramsay	
1938	*	Guilty Trails	Bob Higgins	
1938	*	Prairie Justice	U.S. Marshal Bob Randall, aka Bob Smith	
1938	*	Ghost Town Riders	Bob Martin	
1939	*	Honor of the West	Sheriff Bob Barrett	
1939	*	The Phantom Stage	Bob Carson	
1939	*	Desperate Trails	Clem Waters	
1939		Oklahoma Frontier	Tom Rankin	
1939		Chip of the Flying U	Dusty	
1940		West of Carson City	Nevada	
1940		Riders of Pasco Basin	Bruce Moore	
1940		Bad Man from Red Butte	Gabriel 'Gabby' Hornsby	
1941	–	Along the Rio Grande	Deputy Bob	Uncredited
1941	–	Arizona Bound	Marshal Bat Madison	Uncredited
1942	–	Ride 'Em Cowboy	Ranch Cowhand Driving Bus	Uncredited
1942		Overland Mail	Bill Cody [Chs.1,14]	
1943		Wild Horse Stampede	Marshal Bob Tyler	
1944	–	Oklahoma Raiders	Cowhand in Saloon / Lyncher with Rope	Uncredited
1944	–	Mystery Man	Bar 20 Cowhand	Uncredited, (final film role)
