= Rudy Sooter =

Canadian-American film and television actor

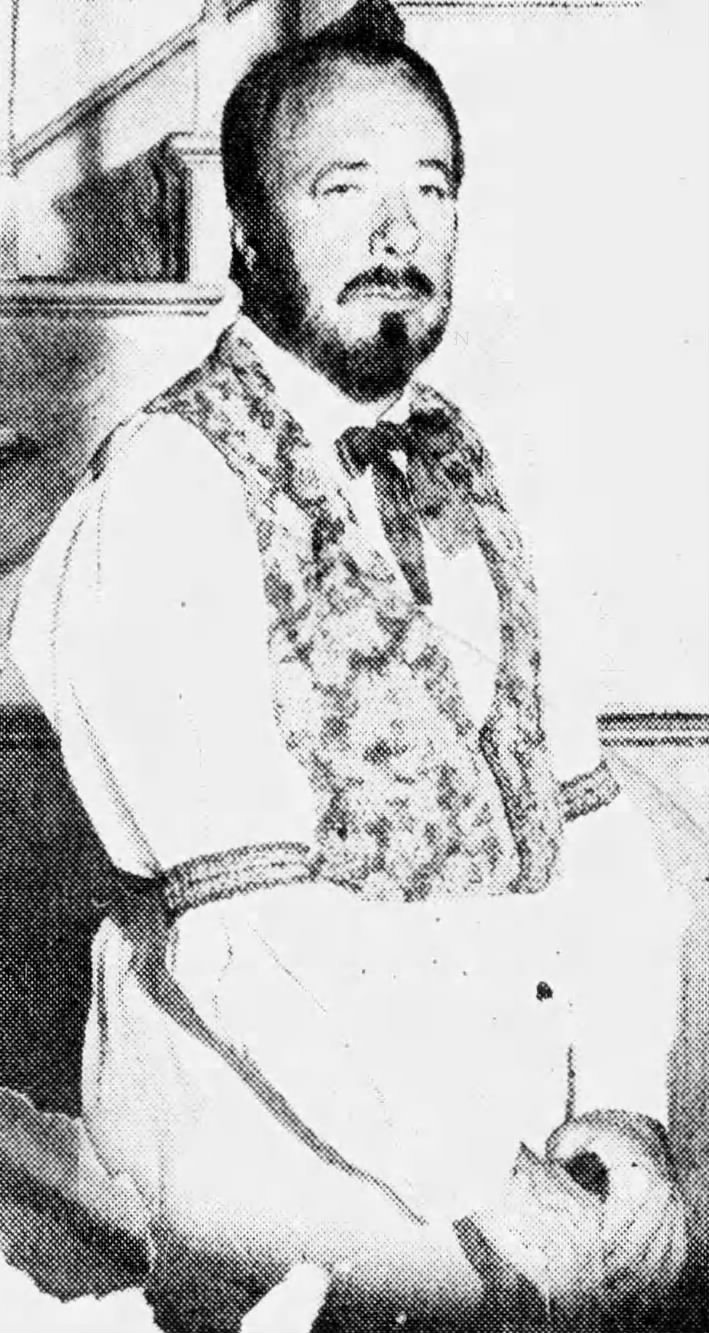
- Sooter in the 1960s
- Born: June 17, 1905; British Columbia
- Died: June 9, 1991 (aged 85)
- Occupations: Film and television actor
- Years active: 1930–1968

Rudy Sooter (June 17, 1905 – June 9, 1991) was a Canadian-American film and television actor. He was known for playing the recurring role of bartender Rudy in the American western television series Gunsmoke.

== Life and career ==
Sooter was born in British Columbia. He began his career in 1930, appearing in the film Trailing Trouble, starring Hoot Gibson and Margaret Quimby.

Later in his career, Sooter appeared in numerous films such as The Unknown Ranger (1936), Rhythm of the Saddle (1938), Destry Rides Again (1939), Bad Man from Red Butte (1940), Texas Trouble Shooters (1942), Gunning for Vengeance (1946), Short Grass (1950), Top Gun (1955), The Oklahoman (1957), One Foot in Hell (1960) and Apache Uprising (1965). He also appeared in numerous television programs including Bonanza, Wanted: Dead or Alive, Rawhide, Bat Masterson, Wagon Train, Have Gun – Will Travel and Death Valley Days.

== Death ==
Sooter died on June 9, 1991, at the age of 85.
