= Frances Robinson (actress) =

American actress (1916–1971)

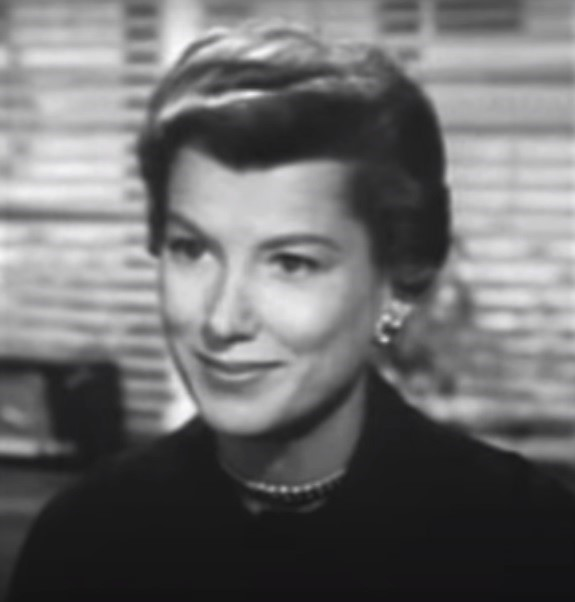
- Robinson in the TV series Four Star Playhouse, episode One Way Out (1955)
- Born: Marion Frances Ladd; April 26, 1916; New York City, U.S.
- Died: August 16, 1971 (aged 55); Los Angeles, California, U.S.
- Occupation: Actress
- Years active: 1921–1970
- Spouse: Sonny Chalif (m. 1963)
- Children: 1

Frances Robinson (born Marion Frances Ladd; April 26, 1916 – August 16, 1971) was an American actress.

== Early life ==
Robinson was born Marion Frances Ladd in the Fort Wadsworth section of Staten Island, New York, on April 26, 1916. Her father was U. S. Army Major James A. Ladd.

At age 5, Robinson portrayed Little Henrietta in the silent film Orphans of the Storm (1921). Before acting in films as an adult, she was a model for the agency operated by John Robert Powers.

== Career ==
Her acting roles included a nurse in The Invisible Man Returns (1940) and Marcia in the 1941 version of Dr Jekyll and Mr Hyde. On television, she portrayed Louise Stewart in 1957 as a member of the regular cast of the CBS situation comedy Mr. Adams and Eve during its first season.

== Personal life ==
Robinson was married to Sonny Chalif, a nephew of actress Mary Pickford; and they had a son, Louis.

She died on August 16, 1971, in Los Angeles, California, at the age of 55 of an apparent heart attack.

== Partial filmography ==
- Tim Tyler's Luck (1937, Serial)
- Forbidden Valley (1938)
- His Exciting Night (1938)
- Personal Secretary (1938)
- The Last Warning (1938)
- Desperate Trails (1939)
- So You Won't Talk (1940)
- The Lone Wolf Keeps a Date (1940)
- Glamour for Sale (1940)
- Outlaws of the Panhandle (1941)
- Dr Jekyll and Mr Hyde (1941) as Marcia
- Bedtime Story (1964)
