= Rio Grande Romance =

1936 film directed by Robert F. Hill

- Directed by: Robert F. Hill
- Based on: short story "One Day's Work" by Peter B. Kyne
- Produced by: Sam Katzman
- Production company: Victory Pictures
- Distributed by: Victory Pictures
- Release date: 23 June 1936
- Running time: 60 mins
- Country: United States
- Language: English

Rio Grande Romance is a 1936 American adventure film directed by Robert F. Hill

It was one of the few non-Westerns from Sam Katzman's Victory Studios.

It was also known as Put on the Spot.

== Cast ==
- Eddie Nugent as Bob Andrews
- Maxine Doyle as Joan Williams
- Fuzzy Knight as Elmer
- Lucille Lund as Rose Carter
- Don Alvarado as Jack Carter
- Nick Stuart as George Bates
- George Walsh as Joe Bradley
- Joyce Kay as Patricia Carter
- George Cleveland as Sheriff Williams
- Forrest Taylor as Richard Shelby
- Ernie Adams as Oscar Lampson
- Ed Cassidy as Jailer Lewis
