= Bad Man from Red Butte =

1940 film directed by Ray Taylor

- Theatrical release poster
- Directed by: Ray Taylor
- Screenplay by: Sam Robins
- Produced by: Joseph Gershenson
- Starring: Johnny Mack Brown; Bob Baker; Fuzzy Knight; Anne Gwynne; Bill Cody Jr. Norman Willis
- Cinematography: William A. Sickner
- Edited by: Paul Landres
- Production company: Universal Pictures
- Distributed by: Universal Pictures
- Release date: June 1, 1940
- Running time: 58 minutes
- Country: United States
- Language: English

Bad Man from Red Butte is a 1940 American Western film directed by Ray Taylor and written by Sam Robins. The film stars Johnny Mack Brown, Bob Baker, Fuzzy Knight, Anne Gwynne, Bill Cody Jr. and Norman Willis. It was released on June 1, 1940, by Universal Pictures.

== Cast ==
- Johnny Mack Brown as Gils Brady / Buck Halliday
- Bob Baker as Gabriel Hornsby
- Fuzzy Knight as Spud Jenkins
- Anne Gwynne as Tibby Mason
- Bill Cody Jr. as Skip Toddhunter
- Norman Willis as Hal Benson
- Earle Hodgins as Hiram T. Cochran
- Roy Barcroft as Hank
- Lafe McKee as Dan Toddhunter
- Lloyd Ingraham as Turner
- Buck Moulton as Jitters
- Mira McKinney as Miss Woods
