= The Honor of the Mounted =

1914 film by Allan Dwan

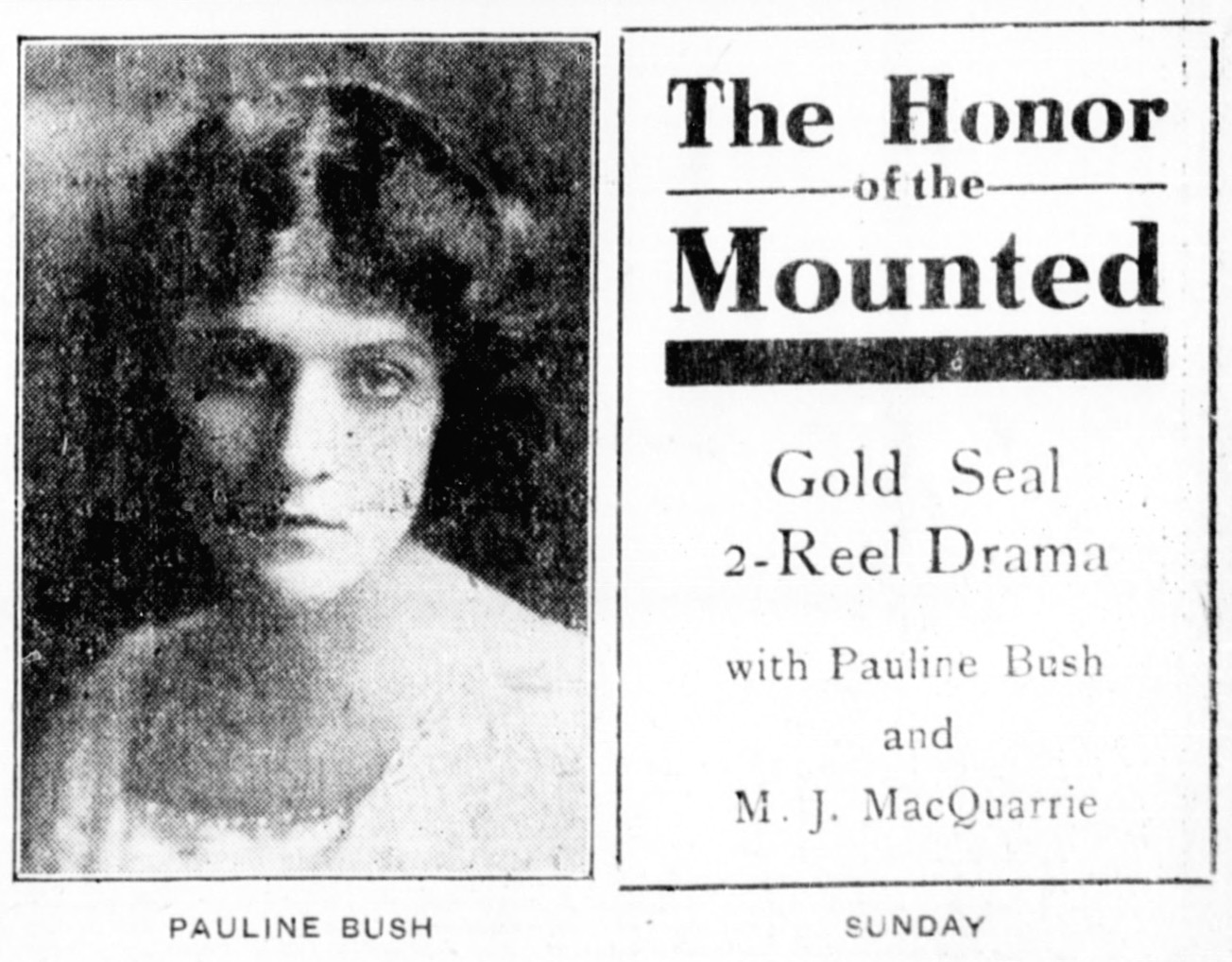
- Newspaper advertisement
- Directed by: Allan Dwan
- Written by: Arthur Rosson
- Starring: Murdock MacQuarrie; Pauline Bush; Lon Chaney
- Distributed by: Universal Film Manufacturing Company
- Release date: February 17, 1914
- Running time: 30 minutes
- Country: United States
- Languages: Silent; English intertitles

The Honor of the Mounted is a 1914 American silent short drama film directed by Allan Dwan and featuring Murdock MacQuarrie, Pauline Bush, and Lon Chaney. The film is now considered lost.

== Plot ==
Mac, Jacques Laquox and Jacques' sister Marie all grew up together in a small town in the Rockies. Mac and Marie love each other, but Mac wants to make something of his life so he travels to the big city and decides to join the Canadian Mounties. Forrest, a fellow Mountie, is sent to Mac's old hometown to investigate a smuggling ring. There he meets Marie and attacks her lustfully. Jacques kills Forrest, and Mac is later sent there by his commanding officer to investigate the murder.

When he returns to his home town, Mac is jeered by his old friends, and even by Marie, for wearing the despised "redcoat". A "Canuck" whom Jacques once thrashed in a fistfight tells Mac all about the murder, and Mac is forced to arrest his old friend Jacques.

When the townspeople attack in a mob, Jacques fights at Mac's side and protects him. Mac refuses to take Jacques back as his prisoner, but Jacques reminds him of his duty as a Mountie. They struggle as they argue, and fall together to their deaths on a treacherous mountain called the "Devil's Slide."

== Cast ==
- Murdock MacQuarrie as Mac, the Mountie
- Pauline Bush as Marie Laquox
- Lon Chaney as Jacques Laquox
- James Neill as Post Commandant
- Gertrude Short as Unknown

== Production notes ==
The film was shot on location in Mount Lowe, California over a two-day period in 1913. Director Allan Dwan also shot Bloodhounds of the North (which also starred Murdock MacQuarrie, Pauline Bush, and Lon Chaney) the same week. During filming, Lon Chaney and screenwriter Arthur Rosson got lost in a canyon and were not located by a rescue party until the end of the day. The cast and crew were also stranded in their cabins for five days due to heavy rains. Dwan had the cast rehearse for an upcoming film, Richelieu, in an effort to save time.

== Reception ==
Universal Weekly opined "Lon Chaney and Mr. MacQuarrie hold the center stage, acting out the great drama that strives to loosen their friendship."

The Moving Picture World wrote "This two-reel drama of the Canadian Northwest Mounted Police has been well acted and admirably staged. The atmosphere of the Northwest woods is always interesting...The story is good."
