= Western Trails =

1938 western film

- Theatrical release poster
- Directed by: George Waggner
- Screenplay by: Norton S. Parker
- Story by: Norton S. Parker
- Produced by: Trem Carr
- Starring: Bob Baker; Marjorie Reynolds; John Ridgely; Carlyle Moore Jr. Forrest Taylor; Franco Corsaro; Bob Burns
- Cinematography: Harry Neumann
- Edited by: Charles Craft
- Production company: Universal Pictures
- Distributed by: Universal Pictures
- Release date: June 1, 1938
- Running time: 58 minutes
- Country: United States
- Language: English

Western Trails is a 1938 American Western film directed by George Waggner and written by Norton S. Parker. The film stars Bob Baker, Marjorie Reynolds, John Ridgely, Carlyle Moore Jr., Forrest Taylor, Franco Corsaro and Bob Burns. The film was released on June 1, 1938, by Universal Pictures.

== Plot ==
While pursuing his father's killers, Bob Mason gets a gunshot wound, while recovering he is assisted by nurse Alice with whom his friend Ben is in love with. Bob discovers that the killer is Alice's brother Rudd and confronts him, however Rudd convinces Ben that Bob is stealing Alice for himself, so Ben removes the bullets from Bob's gun right before he faces off against Rudd.

== Cast ==
- Bob Baker as Bob Mason
- Marjorie Reynolds as Alice Gordon
- John Ridgely as Ben McClure
- Carlyle Moore Jr. as Rudd Gordon
- Forrest Taylor as Williams
- Franco Corsaro as Indian Joe
- Bob Burns as Dan 'Dad' Mason
- Jack Rockwell as Bartender
- Wimpy as Smoky
- Apache as Apache
