= George Waggner =

American actor

- Born: September 7, 1894; New York City, U.S.
- Died: December 11, 1984 (aged 90); Woodland Hills, Los Angeles, California U.S.
- Occupations: Actor, director, screenwriter, producer
- Years active: 1920–1968

George Waggner (September 7, 1894 – December 11, 1984) was an American actor, director, producer and writer. He is best known for producing and directing the 1941 film The Wolf Man. For some unknown reason, Waggner sometimes configured his name in mostly lowercase letters but with his surname's two Gs capitalized ("waGGner"), including in the credits of some of the productions he directed.

== Career ==
Born in New York City, he trained as a chemist and served in World War I before coming to Hollywood to pursue a career as an actor. He made his film debut as an actor portraying Yousayef in The Sheik (1921). He later acted in Western films. The first film he directed was Western Trails (1938). During his career as a film director, he worked with John Wayne (The Fighting Kentuckian), Lon Chaney Jr. (Man Made Monster and his most famous film, The Wolf Man), Brian Donlevy and Broderick Crawford (South of Tahiti), Randolph Scott (Gunfighters) and Boris Karloff (The Climax). Though primarily known for his horror films today, Waggner also directed many Westerns, action films, and war films.

During his career as a film director, he also wrote songs which appeared in his films, beginning with "Round, White, and Ruby Red" from Operation Pacific. By the end of his career, he had written over 100 songs.

In the 1960s, he moved from cinema to television, directing episodes of the television series Maverick, Batman, The Green Hornet, 77 Sunset Strip, 'Hawaiian Eye' and The Man from U.N.C.L.E..

In 1957 he directed Red Nightmare, a Cold War propaganda film produced by the Department of Defense and narrated by Jack Webb.

== Personal life ==
Waggner died in Woodland Hills, Los Angeles, California on December 11, 1984, at the age of 90.

== Filmography ==
Director

- Western Trails (1938)
- Prairie Justice (1938)
- Mystery Plane (1939)
- Stunt Pilot (1939)
- Wolf Call (1939)
- The Phantom Stage (1939)
- Drums of the Desert (1940)
- Man Made Monster (1941)
- Horror Island (1941)
- The Wolf Man (1941)
- South of Tahiti (1941)
- Sealed Lips (1942)
- The Climax (1944)
- Frisco Sal (1945)
- Shady Lady (1945)
- Tangier (1946)
- Gunfighters (1947)
- The Fighting Kentuckian (1949)
- Operation Pacific (1951)
- Red Nightmare aka Freedom and You and The Commies Are Coming, the Commies Are Coming (1957)

Waggner also directed the following films/episodes made for television

- The Sword of Villon (1956)
- Destination Nightmare (1958)
- Jack the Ripper (1958)
- The Veil (1958)
- 77 Sunset Strip ("Canien Caper" - 1959)
- 77 Sunset Strip ("The Left Field Caper" - 1963, stylized as "george waGGner")
- The Jane Wyman Show (“Roadblock Number Seven” - 1957)
- Wagon Train ("The John Cameron Story" - 1957)
- Wagon Train ("The Cliff Grundy Story" - 1957)
- Batman (10 episodes - 1966-1968, stylized as "george waGGner")

Writer

- Gorilla Ship (1932)
- Once to Every Bachelor (1934)
- Champagne for Breakfast (1935)
- Three Legionnaires (1937)
- Air Devils (1938)
- Oklahoma Terror (1939)
- Laughing at Danger (1940)
- The Fatal Hour (1940)
- Queen of the Yukon (1940)
- On the Spot (1940)
- Phantom of Chinatown (1940)
- Drums of the Desert (1940)
- Man Made Monster (1941)
- The Climax (1944)
- The Fighting Kentuckian (1949)
- Operation Pacific (1951)
- Pawnee (1957)
- Man from God's Country (1958)

Producer

- Badlands of Dakota (1941)
- The Wolf Man (1941)
- The Ghost of Frankenstein (1942)
- Sin Town (1942)
- Invisible Agent (1942)
- Frankenstein Meets the Wolf Man (1943)
- Phantom of the Opera (1943)
- Cobra Woman (1944)
- The Climax (1944)

Actor

- The Sheik (1921)
- The Great Alone (1922)
- The Iron Horse (1924)
- His Hour (1924)
- Love's Blindness (1926)
