= The Painted Veil =

The Painted Veil may refer to:

- The Painted Veil (novel), by W. Somerset Maugham
- The Painted Veil (1934 film), directed by Ryszard Bolesławski
- The Painted Veil (2006 film), directed by John Curran
  - The Painted Veil (soundtrack), composed by Alexandre Desplat

== See also ==
- The Seventh Sin
