= Kam Tong =

American actor (1906–1969)

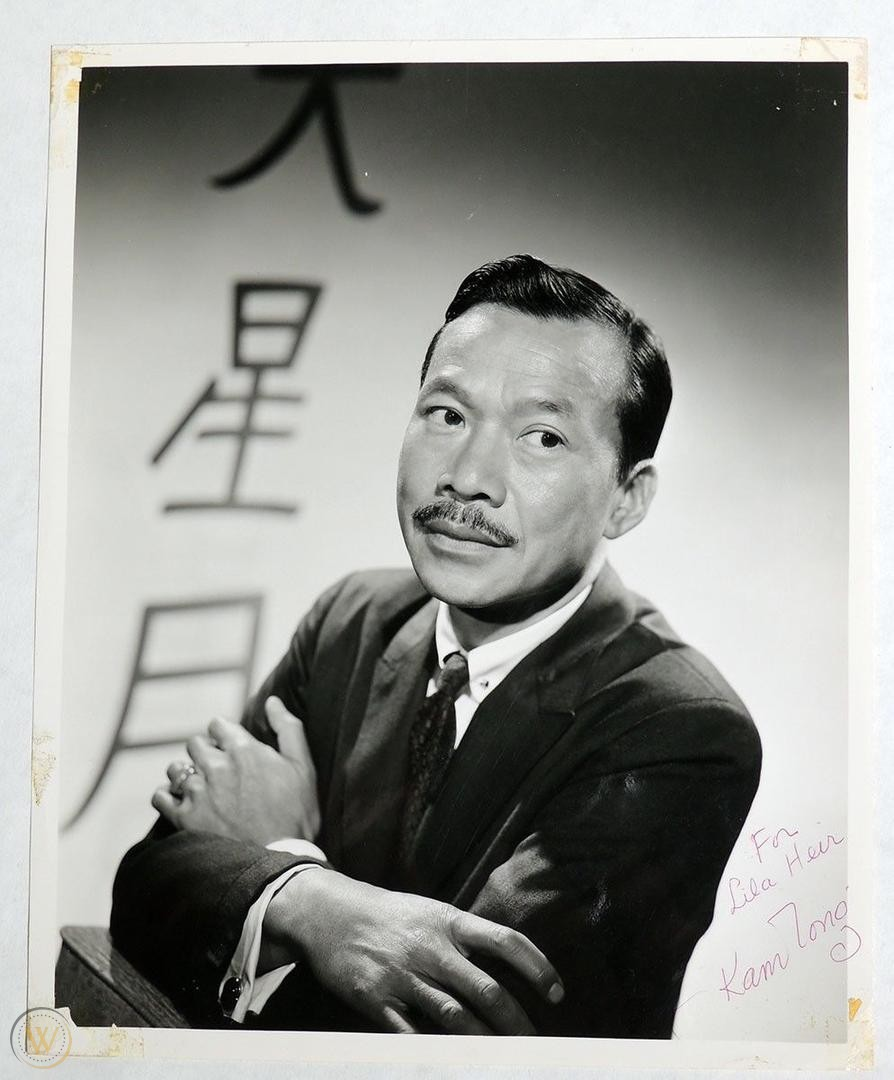
- Born: Kam Dai Tong; December 18, 1906; San Francisco, California, US
- Died: November 8, 1969 (aged 62); Costa Mesa, California, US
- Occupation: Film actor
- Years active: 1936–1969
- Relatives: Frank Tang (brother)

Kam Tong (December 18, 1906 – November 8, 1969) was an American actor. He was best known for his role as Hey Boy on the CBS television series Have Gun – Will Travel and as Dr. Li in the film version of the Rodgers and Hammerstein musical Flower Drum Song. Though appearing as a series regular on Have Gun – Will Travel, Kam was also a regular on the short run CBS-TV series Mr. Garlund in 1960. He appeared in many movies, often as an uncredited Chinese, Japanese, or Filipino character. He appeared in many television shows, including The Man from U.N.C.L.E., The Big Valley, The Time Tunnel, The Final War of Olly Winter, and I Spy.

After serving in World War II in an OSS intelligence unit, he became involved in efforts to raise awareness over gun violence. He also owned and operated a restaurant called Shanghai Lil's in San Francisco.

== Filmography ==
Year	Title	Role	Notes
1936	The General Died at Dawn	Houseboy	Uncredited
1936	Ace Drummond	Mongolian Worker	Serial, Uncredited
1937	The Good Earth	Chinese Peasant	Uncredited
1938	International Settlement	Waiter	Uncredited
1939	The Real Glory	Filipino Soldier	Uncredited
1940	Drums of Fu Manchu	Crawford's Manservant	Serial, [Ch.7], Uncredited
1940	The Man I Married	Reporter at Nazi Rally	Uncredited
1941	Passage from Hong Kong	Newsboy	Uncredited
1942	The Man Who Came to Dinner	Chinese Guest	Uncredited
1942	Rubber Racketeers	Tom	
1942	Lure of the Islands	Lt. Kono	
1942	Joan of Ozark	Japanese Commander	Uncredited
1942	Across the Pacific	T. Oki	
1942	King of the Mounties	Japanese Pilot	Serial, Uncredited
1942	The Hidden Hand	Mallo	
1942	China Girl	Japanese Doctor	Uncredited
1943	They Got Me Covered	Hawara	Uncredited
1943	Salute to the Marines	Japanese Officer	Uncredited
1947	Dishonored Lady	Courtland's Houseboy	Uncredited
1949	State Department: File 649	Chinese Man	Uncredited
1952	Hong Kong	Jewelry Store Clerk	Uncredited
1952	A Yank in Indo-China	Major Lao Kay	
1953	Target Hong Kong	Tai Ching	Uncredited
1954	This Is My Love	Harry	
1955	Soldier of Fortune	Needle - Chinese Communist Interrogator	Uncredited
1955	Abbott and Costello Meet the Mummy	Chinese Busboy	Uncredited
1955	Love Is a Many-Splendored Thing	Dr. Sen	Uncredited
1955	The Left Hand of God	Moslem Messenger	Uncredited
1957	The Seventh Sin	Colonel Yu	Uncredited
1958	The Hunters	Red Chinese Officer	Uncredited
1960	Who Was That Lady?	Lee Wong	Uncredited
1960	Walk Like a Dragon	San	Uncredited
1961	Flower Drum Song	Doctor Li	
1963	It Happened at the World's Fair	Uncle Walter Ling	
1964	The Virginian	Ning Yang	Episode "Smile of a Dragon"
1964	The Virginian	Chang	Episode "The Hour of the Tiger"
1966	Women of the Prehistoric Planet	Jung	
1966	Stagecoach	Waldo	Uncredited
1966	Mister Buddwing	Dice Player #5	
1966	Dimension 5	Kim Fong	
1967	The Time Tunnel	Lieutenant Nakamura	S1, 17 "Kill Two By Two"
1967	Kill a Dragon	Win Lim	
1969	The Big Valley	Wong	Episode "The Royal Road"
1969	The Mad Room	Male Nurse	Uncredited, (final film role)
