= Lee Tung Foo =

American actor

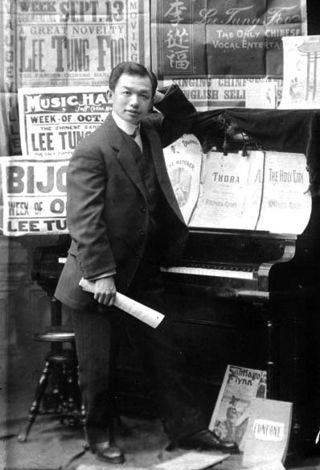
- Singer in the United States
- Born: April 23, 1875; Watsonville, California, U.S.
- Died: May 1, 1966 (aged 91); Los Angeles, California, U.S.
- Other name: Lee Tong Foo
- Occupation: Actor
- Years active: 1910–1962

Lee Tung Foo (also known as Frank Lee) was a Chinese American Vaudeville performer born in California who performed in English, German, and Latin. He became a film actor later in his life.

At the age of 45, he ran a Chinese restaurant he bought in New York City called Jung Sy Mandarin Restaurant. He opened a second restaurant, Imig Sy, and both were strategically placed near Broadway. By the 1930s he returned to theater work, playing some minor roles until 1932, when he was cast as Wang Yun in the film, The Skull Murder Mystery.

He continued with minor roles, being cast as the servant of the detective, Mr. Wong, in the 1939 film The Mystery of Mr. Wong. His last work was in The Manchurian Candidate, an uncredited role at the age of 87.

== Early life ==
Born in 1875 in Watsonville, California, Lee was a son of Chinese immigrants. Lee's parents had started a laundry and grocery business in Watsonville, but they moved many times before finally settling in Ripon, California. In his youth, Lee had run away from home after growing pressure from his father to leave school and work full-time.

Working as a servant, Lee was introduced to American music by his employers who had also encouraged him to go to school. A servant in the Oakland home of Zeno Mauvais, a local music store owner, Lee was influenced by Mae S. Mauvais, who worked in the Chinese Presbyterian Mission. Lee joined the church, sang in the mission choir, and played the piano and reed organ. Through the mission, Lee was taken in by Margaret Blake-Alverson, a voice teacher who he worked with many years.

== Early career ==
Lee first came in to the vaudeville stage in 1905. Hoping to dismantle the "racist attitudes that had been developing on the stage and in print media over the latter half of the nineteenth century," Lee fused yellowface, a caricature portrayal of Asians done by white actors, with "singing operatic and popular songs, doing ethnic impersonations, and exchanging comedic patter".

By combining what the general public were familiar with, yellowface, and using his musical and comedic talent, Lee quickly gained recognition. His singing performance left many thinking that it was remarkable a Chinese man could sing this well. Lee broke the stereotype that Chinese musical ability were limited and inferior and became the forefront of Chinese Americans performing in American popular culture.

== Touring and act ==
At the height of his career Lee toured vaudeville theaters from United States, Canada, and Europe. In these 14 years of touring, Lee's vaudeville acts mainly consisted of singing operatic and popular songs as well as caricature acting of the Irish, Scottish, and Chinese. Lee's most famous sets were of mocking stereotypes of Chinese immigrants and Scottish caricatures, which he based on Harry Lauder's character Highlander.

Lee trained for various songs to implement in his routine. His light operatic work were also challenging such as "The Watcher" (1846), "The Holy City" (1892), and "Thora" (1905). Lee also performed many popular acts such as numbers from Tin Pan Alley and "My Own United States" (1909) a song from a Civil War-themed musical, When Johnny comes Marching Home.

== Acting in Hollywood ==
By the 1920s, Lee stopped performing in vaudeville and had worked in his restaurant in New York City. Lee was also married in 1918 and had family commitments to uphold. Lee moved back to Los Angeles and started acting in films as talkies became popular. Lee played minor roles that were often stereotypical of Asians. In at least 39 films, Lee's roles were of the immigrant workers, cooks, servants, waiters, and laundrymen. Some of Lee's most notable appearances are in They Knew What They Wanted (1940) and Phantom of Chinatown (1940). He also appeared in a 1950 episode of The Lone Ranger.

== Partial filmography ==
- The General Died at Dawn (1936) - Mr. Chen
- Stowaway (1936) - Bartender (uncredited)
- Waikiki Wedding (1937) - Gardener (uncredited)
- Top of the Town (1937) - Chinese Ambassador (uncredited)
- Thank You, Mr Moto (1937) - Man Questioned by Authorities (uncredited)
- Change of Heart (1938) - Chinese Laundryman (uncredited)
- Mr. Wong, Detective (1938) - Tchin
- Red Barry (1938, Serial) - Importation Store Clerk (uncredited)
- Stand Up and Fight (1939) - Chinese Cook (scenes deleted)
- The Mystery of Mr. Wong (1939) - Willie
- Mr. Wong in Chinatown (1939) - Willie
- Barricade (1939) - Houseboy (uncredited)
- Dance Girl Dance (1940)
- Phantom Raiders (1940) - Mr. Yamamoto (uncredited)
- They Knew What They Wanted (1940) - Ah Gee, the Cook
- Phantom of Chinatown (1940) - Foo
- Flight Command (1940) - Jung, Gary's Servant (uncredited)
- Dead Men Tell (1941) - Wu Mei (uncredited)
- They Met in Bombay (1941) - Elder Foo Sing (uncredited)
- Accent on Love (1941) - Chinese Man in Courtroom (uncredited)
- Passage from Hong Kong (1941) - Porter (uncredited)
- Secret of the Wastelands (1941) - Doy Kee
- The Tuttles of Tahiti (1942) - Islander (uncredited)
- Invisible Agent (1942) - Gen. Chin Lee (uncredited)
- Somewhere I'll Find You (1942) - Chinese Doctor (uncredited)
- Across the Pacific (1942) - Sam Wing On
- Mission to Moscow (1943) - Tsiang Ting Fu - Chinese Ambassador (uncredited)
- Night Plane from Chungking (1943) - Bus Driver (uncredited)
- Behind the Rising Sun (1943) - Dinner Guest (uncredited)
- The Purple Heart (1944) - Judge (uncredited)
- Dragon Seed (1944) - Innkeeper (uncredited)
- Barbary Coast Gent (1944) - Wong Gee (uncredited)
- Laura (1944) - Waldo's Servant (uncredited)
- Mrs. Parkington (1944) - Sam (uncredited)
- They Were Expendable (1945) - Asian Bartender (uncredited)
- It Shouldn't Happen to a Dog (1946) - Laundryman (uncredited)
- The Show-Off (1946) - Chinese Waiter (uncredited)
- Calcutta (1947) - Kim (uncredited)
- Heaven Only Knows (1947) - Thank You (uncredited)
- The Chinese Ring (1947) - Armstrong's Butler (uncredited)
- Sleep, My Love (1948) - Wedding Official (uncredited)
- Saigon (1948) - Chinese Farmer (uncredited)
- The Checkered Coat (1948) - Kim
- The Golden Eye (1948) - Wong Fai (uncredited)
- Luxury Liner (1948) - Fu Dong, Chinese Chef (uncredited)
- Strange Gamble (1948) - Wong
- Criss Cross (1949) - Chinese Cook (uncredited)
- The Stratton Story (1949) - Waiter (uncredited)
- The Gay Amigo (1949) - Lee - Cantina Cook (uncredited)
- Mighty Joe Young (1949) - Chinese Waiter (uncredited)
- There's a Girl in My Heart (1949) - Charlie Li
- Annie Get Your Gun (1950) - Chinese Cook on Train (uncredited)
- The Cariboo Trail (1950) - Ling
- California Passage (1950) - Cook (uncredited)
- Short Grass (1950) - Lin
- The Thing from Another World (1951) - Lee - a Cook (uncredited)
- Smuggler's Island (1951) - Vito (uncredited)
- China Corsair (1951) - Police Captain Lee (uncredited)
- Hong Kong (1952) - Chinese Waiter (uncredited)
- Macao (1952) - Merchant (uncredited)
- The World in His Arms (1952) - Chinese Proprietor (uncredited)
- Soldier of Fortune (1955) - Chinese Cook (uncredited)
- Love Is a Many Splendored Thing (1955) - Old Loo (uncredited)
- Meet Me in Las Vegas (1956) - Lee (uncredited)
- Badlands of Montana (1957) - Ling
- The Sheepman (1958) - Willie, Proprietor of Restaurant (uncredited)
- The Manchurian Candidate (1962) - Man in Lobby (uncredited) (final film role)
