= Frank Tang =

Chinese-American actor (1905–1968)

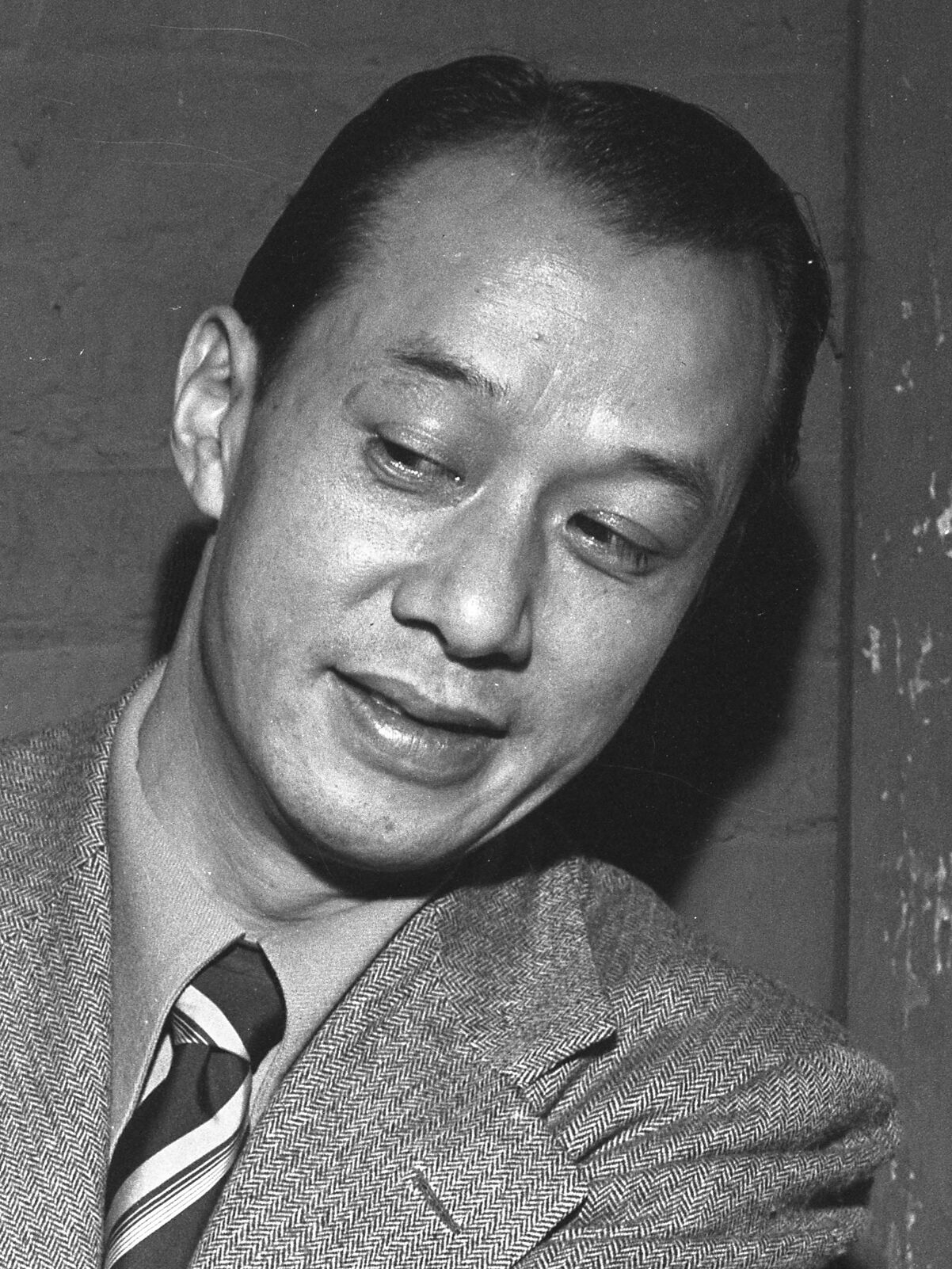
- Tang in 1948
- Born: Dai Jung Tong; November 27, 1905; San Francisco, California, US
- Died: June 29, 1968 (aged 62); Los Angeles, California, US
- Occupation(s): Actor, film director
- Spouse: Birdie Tong
- Relatives: Kam Tong (brother)

Frank Tang (born Dai Jung Tong, Chinese: 唐隸忠; Jyutping: tong4 dai6 zung1; November 27, 1905 – June 29, 1968) was a Chinese-American character actor, filmmaker, community leader, and restaurateur who was best-known for directing the 1936 Cantonese-language film Sum Hun.

== Biography ==
Frank was born in San Francisco into a big Chinese-American family. His parents, Yee Tong and Wong Shee, were immigrants. His brother Kam Tong would also become an actor.

He began his career in Hollywood in the late 1920s, and he got a rare chance to work as a director in 1936, when he teamed up with Bruce Wong and Esther Eng to make the Cantonese-language American film Sum Hun. He'd appear in over a dozen films afterward in smaller roles, in addition to serving as a technical advisor.

Later in life, he owned and operated a restaurant called Tang's in Los Angeles's Chinatown neighborhood. He died in 1968 at the age of 62 after an illness, and was survived by his wife, Birdie, and several siblings.

== Selected filmography ==
As director:

- Sum Hun (1936)

As actor:

- The Hunters (1958)
- The Lineup (1958)
- The Seventh Sin (1957)
- Soldier of Fortune (1955)
- God Is My Co-Pilot (1945)
- Objective, Burma! (1945)
- Dragon Seed (1944)
- The Purple Heart (1944)
- Destination Tokyo (1943)
- The Man from Down Under (1943)
- Salute to the Marines (1943)
- We've Never Been Licked (1943)
- West of Shanghai (1937)
- The Leathernecks Have Landed (1936)
- The Great Divide (1929)
