= The Big Bluff =

The Big Bluff may refer to:

- The Big Bluff (1955 film), an American film directed by W. Lee Wilder
- The Big Bluff (1933 German film), a comedy film directed by Georg Jacoby
- The Big Bluff (1933 American film), a comedy film directed by Reginald Denny
