= The Man Who Came to Dinner (1941 film) =

1941 film by William Keighley

- Theatrical release poster
- Directed by: William Keighley
- Screenplay by: Julius J. Epstein; Philip G. Epstein
- Based on: The Man Who Came to Dinner by George S. Kaufman and Moss Hart
- Produced by: Hal B. Wallis (executive producer)
- Starring: Bette Davis; Ann Sheridan; Monty Woolley; Jimmy Durante; Richard Travis; Billie Burke; Reginald Gardiner
- Cinematography: Tony Gaudio
- Edited by: Jack Killifer
- Music by: Friedrich Hollaender
- Production company: Warner Bros. Pictures
- Distributed by: Warner Bros. Pictures
- Release date: December 24, 1941
- Running time: 112 minutes
- Country: United States
- Language: English
- Budget: $1.1 million
- Box office: $2.6 million (worldwide rentals)

The Man Who Came to Dinner is a 1941 American screwball comedy film directed by William Keighley, and starring Bette Davis, Ann Sheridan and, as the titular character, Monty Woolley. The screenplay by Julius J. and Philip G. Epstein is based on the 1939 play by George S. Kaufman and Moss Hart. The supporting cast features Jimmy Durante, Richard Travis, Billie Burke, and Reginald Gardiner.

== Plot ==
While passing through the small town of Mesalia, Ohio, during a cross-country lecture tour, notoriously acerbic New York radio personality Sheridan Whiteside injures his hip after slipping and falling on the icy steps of the house of the Stanleys, a prominent family with whom he is supposed to dine as a publicity stunt. He insists on recuperating in their home during the Christmas holidays, to which they agree to avoid a threatened $150,000 lawsuit with Thomas E. Dewey as his attorney.

The overbearing, self-centered celebrity soon comes to dominate the lives of the residents and everyone else who enters the household. He commandeers the most prominent rooms in the house and restricts his host and hostess to the upper story of their house. He cons the doctor to exaggerate his recovery time by promising to read the doctor's unpublished book, which he promptly disregards. He runs up long-distance phone bills to and from important personages like Winston Churchill and Ethiopian Emperor Haile Selassie. He receives intrusive presents from prominent naturalists such as live shipments of four penguins and an octopus. He invites to a luncheon convicts, including murderers, from the "Sheridan Whiteside fan club" from the state penitentiary. He bullies and exasperates his nurse to the point that she quits, declaring she has changed her mission in life from relieving the suffering of humanity to working at a munitions factory.

Whiteside encourages young adults Richard and June Stanley to pursue their dreams, contrary to the wishes of their conventional father. He declares that Ernest Stanley's odd sister Harriet is "right out of The Hound of the Baskervilles", trying to recall where he has seen her face before.

Meanwhile, Whiteside's assistant Maggie Cutler finds herself attracted to local newspaperman Bert Jefferson. When Bert reads his play to her, she is so impressed she asks Whiteside to show it to his contacts. After a few dates, she announces she will quit Whiteside's employment to marry Bert, though Bert does not know it yet. Bert gives her a gold charm bracelet as a Christmas present and they flirtatiously banter.

Loath to lose such an efficient aide, Whiteside does his best to sabotage the blossoming romance. He exaggerates the effects of his injuries to extend his stay in the house to further his sabotage. Luring glamorous actress Lorraine Sheldon with the prospect of a leading role in an "important" new play by an "up-and-coming playwright", he intends Lorraine to steal Bert away from Maggie. Lorraine convinces Bert to spend time with her to fix up the play.

Threatened by Lorraine's presence, Maggie conspires with Whiteside's friend Beverly Carlton, a practical joker and accomplished mimic, to impersonate Lorraine's wealthy would-be prospect, Lord Cedric Bottomley, who Lorraine has pursued relentlessly for months, luring Lorraine back to Palm Beach with a telephoned proposal from "Lord Bottomley". When Lorraine discovers the ruse, she vows to take Bert from Maggie.

When Maggie realizes Whiteside is behind the underhanded scheme with Lorraine, she quits. Somewhat chastened, Whiteside concocts a plan to get Lorraine out of the way, with the help of his friend Banjo. Appealing to Lorraine's vanity, they trick her into acting out a scenario and stepping into an Egyptian sarcophagus, slam it shut, and ship her off to Nova Scotia.

Finally fed up with his shenanigans, meddling, insults, and unbearable personality, Mr. Stanley swears out a warrant ordering Whiteside to leave in 15 minutes. However, with seconds to spare, Whiteside recalls that Stanley's sister Harriet has a past as an infamous axe murderess, and blackmails Stanley by threatening to expose her. He forces Mr. Stanley to drop the warrant, and further to allow his children to do as they please.

As Whiteside departs, First Lady Eleanor Roosevelt calls on the phone. Distracted by the last-minute notification, Whiteside falls on the Stanleys' icy steps again and is carried back inside, much to Mr. Stanley's consternation. Meanwhile, Eleanor Roosevelt is forgotten, left unattended on the phone in the commotion.

== Cast ==
- Bette Davis as Maggie Cutler
- Ann Sheridan as Lorraine Sheldon
- Monty Woolley as Sheridan Whiteside
- Richard Travis as Bert Jefferson
- Jimmy Durante as Banjo
- Billie Burke as Mrs. Ernest Stanley (Daisy)
- Reginald Gardiner as Beverly Carlton
- Elisabeth Fraser as June Stanley
- Grant Mitchell as Ernest Stanley
- George Barbier as Dr. Bradley
- Mary Wickes as Miss Preen
- Russell Arms as Richard Stanley
- Ruth Vivian as Harriet Stanley
- Edwin Stanley as John
- Betty Roadman as Sarah
- Charles Drake as Sandy
- Nanette Vallon as Cosette
- John Ridgely as radio man

Uncredited (in order of appearance)

- Dudley Dickerson as porter at train station
- Patrick McVey as Harry, the baggage clerk
- Roland Drew as reporter
- Ernie Adams as Michaelson
- Leslie Brooks as Hollywood blonde
- Georgia Carroll as Hollywood blonde
- Bess Flowers as fan at train station
- Florence Wix as fan at train station
- Leah Baird as fan at train station
- Lottie Williams as fan at train station
- Sol Gorss as chauffeur
- Beal Wong as Chinese guest
- Kam Tong as Chinese guest
- Creighton Hale as radio man
- Hank Mann as expressman
- Eddy Chandler as guard
- Fred Kelsey as detective
- Frank Mayo as plainclothesman
- Jack Mower as plainclothesman
- Alix Talton as chorus girl
- Frank Moran as Haggerty

Cast notes

- Monty Woolley, Ruth Vivian, and Mary Wickes reprised their roles from the original Broadway production.
- Russell Arms and Wickes made their screen debuts.

== Production ==
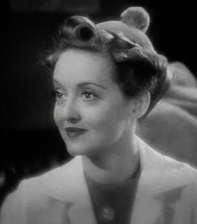
Bette Davis in the film's trailer

Four of the leading characters are based on real-life personalities. Sheridan Whiteside was inspired by celebrated critic and Algonquin Round Table member Alexander Woollcott, who eventually played the role on stage; Lorraine Sheldon by musical stage actress Gertrude Lawrence; Beverly Carlton by playwright and renowned wit Noël Coward; and Banjo by Algonguin Round Table member Harpo Marx.

When Bette Davis saw the Broadway production of The Man Who Came to Dinner, she decided the role of Maggie Cutler would be a refreshing change of pace following her heavily dramatic role in The Little Foxes. She urged Jack L. Warner to purchase the screen rights for her and John Barrymore. Barrymore tested for the role of Whiteside but was deemed unsuitable when, as a result of his heavy drinking (or perhaps encroaching Alzheimers), he supposedly had difficulty delivering the complicated, fast-paced dialogue, even with his lines posted on cue cards throughout the set. The screen test was exhibited at the Museum of Modern Art in the early 21st century prior to a screening of the film, making the reason for Davis' subsequent rage at the studio's decision not to cast the superb Barrymore quite apparent.

Both Charles Laughton and Orson Welles, who wanted to direct the film, campaigned for the role, and Laird Cregar and Robert Benchley made screen tests; but executive producer Hal B. Wallis thought the former was "overblown and extravagant" and the latter "too mild mannered." Warner suggested Cary Grant, who had just finished Suspicion (1941), but Wallis felt he was "far too young and attractive". Although Monty Woolley, who had created the role on the Broadway stage, was not familiar to film audiences, Wallis finally cast him in the role, despite Warner's concern that the actor's homosexuality would be obvious on screen. Welles would later play Whiteside 30 years later in a television adaptation of the play.

Bette Davis detested the casting of Woolley; she fought hard to cast John Barrymore but was overruled by the studio. In later years, she observed, "I felt the film was not directed in a very imaginative way. For me, it was not a happy film to make; that it was a success, of course, did make me happy. I guess I never got over my disappointment in not working with the great John Barrymore."

== Home media ==
Warner Home Video released the Region 1 DVD on May 30, 2006. The film has an English audio track and subtitles in English, Spanish, and French. Bonus features include The Man Who Came to Dinner: Inside a Classic Comedy, the Joe McDoakes comedy short So You Think You Need Glasses, the musical short Six Hits and a Miss (directed by Jean Negulesco), and the original theatrical trailer.

A Warner Archive Collection DVD was released on August 23, 2016.

The film was released on Blu-ray by the Warner Archive Collection on March 31, 2026. The special features of the release include the original theatrical trailer, The Man Who Came to Dinner: Inside a Classic Comedy, and two audio-only broadcasts, as well as the musical short Glen Gary and His Casa Loma Orchestra and the classic Bugs Bunny cartoon The Wabbit Who Came to Supper.

== Reception ==
=== Box office ===
According to Warner Bros. records, the film earned rentals of $1,666,000 in the United States and Canada and $899,000 foreign for a worldwide total of $2,565,000.

=== Critical response ===
On the review aggregator website Rotten Tomatoes, the film holds an approval rating of 86% based on seven reviews, with an average rating of 7.8/10.

Bosley Crowther of The New York Times observed, "Any one who happened to miss the original acid-throwing antic on the stage – and any one, for that matter, who happened not to have missed it – should pop around, by all means, and catch the cinematic reprise. For here, in the space of something like an hour and fifty-two minutes, is compacted what is unquestionably the most vicious but hilarious cat-clawing exhibition ever put on the screen, a deliciously wicked character portrait and a helter-skelter satire, withal." He added, "Woolley makes The Man Who Came to Dinner a rare old goat. His zest for rascality is delightful, he spouts alliterations as though he were spitting out orange seeds, and his dynamic dudgeons in a wheelchair are even mightier than those of Lionel Barrymore. A more entertaining buttinsky could hardly be conceived, and a less entertaining one would be murdered on the spot. One palm should be handed Bette Davis for accepting the secondary role of the secretary, and another palm should be handed her for playing it so moderately and well." In conclusion, he said, "The picture as a whole is a bit too long and internally complex for 100 per cent comprehension, considering the speed at which it clips. But even if you don't catch all of it, you're sure to get your money's worth. It makes laughing at famous people a most satisfying delight."

Variety made note of the "superb casting and nifty work by every member of the company" and thought the "only detracting angle in the entire film is [the] slowness of the first quarter. [The] portion in which the characters are being built up, before the complications of the story actually begin, is overlong."

Time stated, "Woolley plays Sheridan Whiteside with such vast authority and competence that it is difficult to imagine anyone else attempting it" and added, "Although there is hardly room for the rest of the cast to sandwich in much of a performance between this fattest of fat parts, Bette Davis, hair up, neuroses gone, is excellent as Woolley's lovesick secretary."

Time Out London said, "It's rather unimaginatively directed, but the performers savour the sharp, sparklingly cynical dialogue with glee."

Pauline Kael wrote, "Wooley has a wonderful way of looking at these hick fans with compassionate contempt—he feels sorry for them because they're too obtuse to appreciate how brilliant he is. The play, however, was built on topical jokes and a series of vaudeville turns, and in this version the jokes are flat and the turns seem forced and not very funny." Leonard Maltin gave it three and a half of four stars, calling it a "[d]elightful adaptation of George S. Kaufman–Moss Hart play". Leslie Halliwell gave it three of four stars and wrote, "Delightfully malicious caricature of Alexander Woolcott which, though virtually confined to one set, moves so fast that one barely notices the lack of cinematic variety, and certainly provides more than a laugh a minute".

=== Accolades ===
Monty Woolley was nominated for a New York Film Critics Circle Award in 1942 for Best Actor.

== See also ==
- List of Christmas films
