= Peter Chong (actor) =

American actor

- Born: John Kohnie Kuh; December 2, 1898; Honolulu, Hawaii, U.S.
- Died: January 13, 1985 (aged 86); Los Angeles, California, U.S.
- Education: Oberlin College
- Occupation: Actor
- Spouses: Soo Yong (m. 1929; div. 1933) Eileen Loh (m. 1945)

Peter Chong (born John Kohnie Kuh, and sometimes credited as Goo Chong or Peter Chong Goe; December 2, 1898 – January 13, 1985) was a Chinese-American character actor who worked in Hollywood in the 1940s and 1950s.

== Biography ==
=== Origins ===
Chong was born in 1898 at Honolulu, Hawaii. He attended Oberlin College; he eventually earned a master's degree and a PhD.

=== Acting career ===
He appeared in a number of Broadway productions and had a vaudeville act before going to Hollywood to work in film. When he arrived in Los Angeles, he was under contract at Warner Brothers. He also worked part-time as an interpreter for the Los Angeles Police Department. For much of his career, he was cast in Japanese, Indonesian, and Hawaiian roles — he didn't play a Chinese role until 1953.

=== Personal life ===
He and his first wife, Ah He "Soo" Young, had a vaudeville act together. His second marriage was to Eileen Loh, a schoolteacher; they had a daughter together named Molly.

== Partial filmography ==
- The Letter (1929) - Servant (uncredited)
- Mission to Moscow (1943) - Japanese Ambassador Shigemitsu (uncredited)
- Around the World (1943) - Mr. Wong (uncredited)
- Up in Arms (1944) - Japanese Lieutenant (uncredited)
- The Purple Heart (1944) - Mitsuru Toyama
- Betrayal from the East (1945) - Capt. Yasuda (uncredited)
- First Yank Into Tokyo (1945) - Dr. Kai Koon (uncredited)
- The Beginning or the End (1947) - Japanese General (uncredited)
- Intrigue (1947) - Editor
- To the Ends of the Earth (1948) - Joe (uncredited)
- Easter Parade (1948) - Sam - Don's Valet (uncredited)
- On the Town (1949) - Bartender (uncredited)
- The Reformer and the Redhead (1950) - Henry - Chinese Cook (uncredited)
- Francis Goes to the Races (1951) - Wong, Travers' Servant (uncredited)
- Smuggler's Gold (1951) - Boat Captain (uncredited)
- Smuggler's Island (1951) - Cajo (uncredited)
- Peking Express (1951) - Dining Car Steward (uncredited)
- A Yank in Indo-China (1952) - General Wang
- The World in His Arms (1952) - Wung Lo (uncredited)
- Target Hong Kong (1953) - Mandarin (uncredited)
- Remains to Be Seen (1953) - Ling Tan
- South Sea Woman (1953) - Woo Ching (uncredited)
- Torch Song (1953) - Peter
- Forbidden (1953) - Dr. Sing (uncredited)
- Miss Sadie Thompson (1953) - Chung (uncredited)
- Hell and High Water (1954) - Japanese Eddy (uncredited)
- The Left Hand of God (1955) - Fen Tso Lin - Merchant (uncredited)
- Tribute to a Bad Man (1956) - Cooky
- The Inn of the Sixth Happiness (1958) - Yang
- This Earth Is Mine (1959) - Chu
- The Mountain Road (1960) - Chinese Colonel
