= Lu Yan (disambiguation) =

Lu Yan (829–874) was a Tang dynasty official.

Lu Yan is also the name of:

- Lü Dongbin or Lü Yan, the leader of the Eight Immortals
- Lisa Lu (born 1927) or Lu Yan, Chinese-American actress
- Lu Yen (1930–2008), Chinese/Taiwanese composer
- Lu Yan (ice hockey) (born 1972), Chinese ice hockey player
- Lü Yan (model) (born 1981), Chinese model, designer, and actress
