= Soo Yong =

American actress

- Born: October 31, 1903; Wailuku, Hawaii
- Died: October 29, 1984 (aged 80); Honolulu, Hawaii
- Other names: Young Hee, Ahee, Soo Yong-Huang
- Education: Mid-Pacific Institute, University of Hawaiʻi, Teachers College, Columbia University
- Occupation: Actress
- Spouses: Peter Chong (m. 1929; div. 1933) C.K. Huang (m. 1941)

Soo Yong, (Chinese: 楊秀, originally Young Hee (楊喜); October 31, 1903 – October 29, 1984) was a Chinese-American actress. She acted in 23 Hollywood films and numerous television shows, mostly in supporting roles. Among them were The Good Earth (1937), Love Is a Many-Splendored Thing (1955), and Sayonara (1957). In 1941 she married C.K. Huang.

== Youth and education ==
Soo Yong was born into a family which had come from Zhongshan, Guangdong, where the Young clan was one of the largest family organizations. She was known as Young Hee, or Ahee as a child. Her father was a contract laborer in the Waikiki sugarcane plantations, then became a taxi driver important enough in the community to be a friend and frequent host to Sun Yat-sen. She attended Christian Sunday school even though the family worshiped Buddha at home. She lost both parents by the time she was 15, and moved to Honolulu, where her earnings from working for white families paid her school tuition. At some point she picked up Mandarin.

After graduation from Mid-Pacific Institute and then the University of Hawaiʻi in 1925, her aim was to go into teaching. She made the trip to the mainland to enroll at Teachers College, Columbia University, making her one of only fifty women of Chinese descent enrolled in an American college. Her M.A. in Education was granted in June 1927, at which point she changed her name from "Ah Hee" to Soo Yong.

== Career ==
Over the next few years, she had roles in several Broadway plays, the first one starring Katherine Cornell, whose "techniques, certain postures, and gestures" she said she emulated. In 1929, she married fellow actor Goo Chang (Peter Chong). The first major advancement of her career was the opportunity to use her fluency in Mandarin and native English as onstage translator for Mei Lanfang's Peking Opera, first in New York and then a tour of North America in 1930. She freely interpreted the stories and explained the action in terms which American audiences could understand. The New York Times praised her by name, saying "Miss Yong speaks English with a clarity of diction rarely encountered among native American speakers," apparently not realizing that she was in fact a native American speaker. After the finish of the tour, she and her husband performed on Broadway together. They went back on the road, where, however, the marriage ended in 1933. After the divorce was complete in June 1933, she returned to Hawai'i, then later that year to Los Angeles.

While in California on tour with Mai Lanfang in 1930, she had made valuable contacts in Los Angeles, and the local newspapers reported on her return. She enrolled in a PhD program in education at University of Southern California but auditioned for film roles. Her first screen appearance was as an amah in The Painted Veil, starring Greta Garbo. In spite of never having been to China, she was frequently described in the press and studio publicity as being "Chinese." She responded by presenting herself as cultured and educated representative of her culture. "Like all Oriental art," she stated to an interviewer, "the Chinese artist does not present a complete picture of his art. Chinese pictures are like Chinese poetry. The poet leads you to the garden and gives you the rare essences of the beautiful flowers and you alone must inhale the essences and enjoy the rare beauty."

In 1934, Hays Code of the Motion Picture Producers and Distributors of America had modified their definition of miscegenation to include only black/white relations. But when Metro-Goldwyn-Mayer was casting for the major production of Pearl S. Buck's The Good Earth, the Chinese American actress Anna May Wong was frustrated and angry that the lead role went to a Caucasian actress and refused to accept a lesser one. Soo Yong, on the other hand, was aware of racial discrimination and critical of the novel for portraying only one side of Chinese life, but nevertheless accepted the supporting and challenging role, that of the cruel aunt. Ironically, she was cast as the Chinese aunt who was married to the uncle played by Caucasian actor Walter Connolly. During these years, Soo Yong worked steadily, but always as a character actor. The Honolulu Star-Bulletin reported that "When asked about the possibility for local-born orientals to break into the talkies, she simply said, 'A Chinese has a Chinaman's Chance.'" Yet she maintained her poise. A 1937 Los Angeles Times story described her as "alarmingly intellectual, sinfully humorous and highly personable."

In the late 1930s, Soo Yong developed a series of well-received solo theater pieces which introduced the American public to Chinese culture. She toured briefly with the Red Gate Shadow Puppets, a group which included Rosalind Russell, a major film star. The group was founded by Pauline Benton, who had learned Chinese shadow puppet theater during a residence in Peking and had probably seen Soo Yong when she interpreted for Mei Lanfang on Broadway.

== Marriage, the death of both spouses, and their legacy estate ==
In 1941, Soo Yong married C.K. Huang (Huang Chun Ku; Chinese: 黃春谷), a businessman from Tianjin, in Winter Park, Florida. He had been raised in a family which supported Chinese music and performance and shared Soo Yong's artistic enthusiasms. After two decades in which they spent winters in Florida and summers in Maine, they returned to Hawaii in 1961. C.K. organized the Honolulu Peking Opera Group, and Soo Yong continued to write and perform her Chinese culture presentations. C.K. died in 1980, and Soo Yong died on October 29, 1984, in Honolulu.

Their estate was used to establish the Chun Ku and Soo Yong Huang Foundation, whose direction was transferred in September 1991 to the University of Hawai'i Foundation to be used for grants and graduate scholarships in Chinese culture, theater and drama. The Foundation supported a variety of Chinese theatrical and cultural activities at the University of Hawai'i

== Legacy ==
A recent historian concluded that in Soo Yong's career onstage and in film she set out to combine Chinese and western values without becoming the type of westernized "Modern Girl" represented by Anna May Wong. Her roles present a softer Orientalism that allowed ethnic dignity and did not offend her Chinese-American audiences or her Nationalist friends in China. In contrast to Anna May Wong, who was two years younger and appeared more militant, Soo Yong, but she had spent almost no time in China, was able to balance several worlds and to sustain a position as an off-screen, cultural translator.

== Filmography ==
Year	Title	Role	Notes
1934	The Painted Veil	Amah	
1935	China Seas	Yu-Lan	
1936	Klondike Annie	Fah Wong, Rose's Maid	
1936	Mad Holiday	Li Tai	
1937	The Good Earth	Aunt	
1937	Think Fast, Mr. Moto	Telephone Operator	uncredited
1938	The Adventures of Marco Polo	Chen Tsu's Wife	uncredited
1941	Secret of the Wastelands	Moy Soong	
1943	China	Tai Shen	
1943	Night Plane from Chungking	Madame Wu	
1951	Peking Express	Li Elu	
1952	Big Jim McLain	Mrs. Namaka	
1953	Target Hong Kong	Lao Shan	
1955	Soldier of Fortune	Dak Lai	
1955	Love Is a Many-Splendored Thing	Nora Hung	
1955	The Left Hand of God	Midwife of Pao Chu	uncredited
1956	Flight to Hong Kong	Mama Lin	
1957	Sayonara	Teruko	
1961	Flower Drum Song	Madame Ten Fong	
1965	In Harm's Way	Tearful Woman	
1970	The Hawaiians	Mrs. Ching	uncredited
1971-1978	Hawaii Five-O	Chaperone / Servant / Mme. Sung / Lily Ahn	TV series, 4 episodes
1981	Magnum, P.I.	Old Woman	TV series, 1 episode
