= The Mystery of Mr. Wong =

1939 film

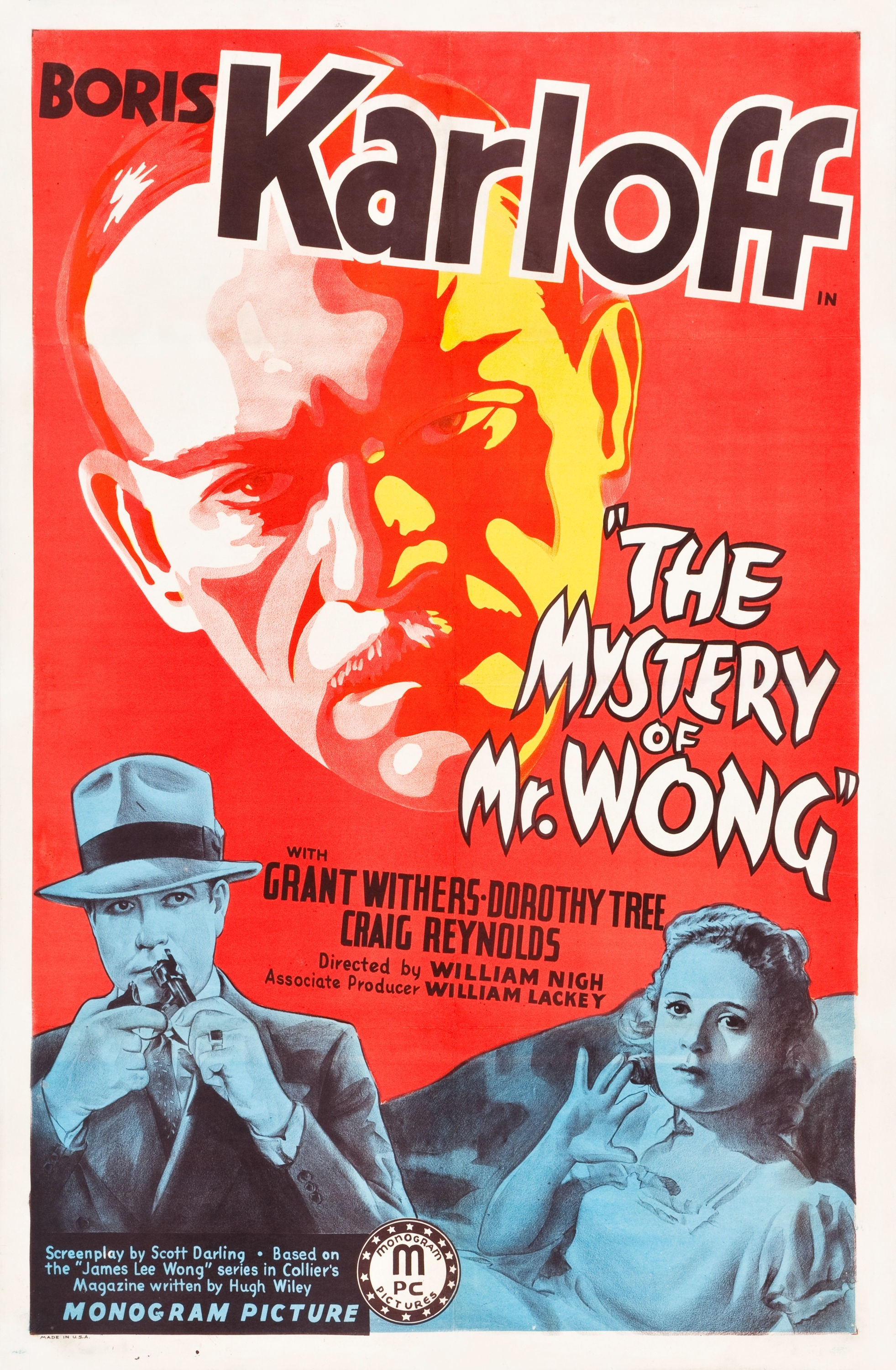
- Film poster
- Directed by: William Nigh
- Written by: Scott Darling; Hugh Wiley
- Produced by: Scott R. Dunlap; William T. Lackey
- Starring: Boris Karloff; Grant Withers
- Cinematography: Harry Neumann
- Edited by: Russell F. Schoengarth
- Music by: Edward J. Kay
- Production company: Monogram Pictures
- Release date: March 8, 1939
- Running time: 68 minutes
- Country: United States
- Language: English

The Mystery of Mr. Wong is a 1939 American mystery film directed by William Nigh and starring Boris Karloff.

The film is the second in the series of Mr. Wong.

== Plot ==
A wealthy gem-collector, Brandon Edwards, gains possession of the largest star sapphire in the world, the 'Eye of the Daughter of the Moon', after it has been stolen in China. Edwards, at a party in his home, confides to Mr. Wong that his life is in danger. During a game of Charades (called "Indications" by Mrs. Edwards), Edwards is mysteriously shot dead and the gem disappears. Unbeknownst to Wong, the jewel is in possession of Edwards' maid, Drina, who intends to return it to China, but she too is murdered, and the gem is taken again. After one more murder—the suspect list is dwindling—Wong exposes the killer, turns him over to Police Inspector Street, and orders his manservant Willy to return the gem to China.

== Cast ==
- Boris Karloff as James Lee Wong
- Grant Withers as Police Captain Sam Street
- Dorothy Tree as Valerie Edwards
- Craig Reynolds as Peter Harrison
- Ivan Lebedeff as Michael Strogonoff
- Holmes Herbert as Prof. Ed Janney
- Morgan Wallace as Brandon Edwards
- Lotus Long as Drina, the Maid
- Chester Gan as Sing, the Butler
- Hooper Atchley as Carslake
- Bruce Wong as Asian Man
- Jack Kennedy as Policeman
- Joe Devlin as George, the Detective
- Lee Tung Foo as Willie (as Lee Tong Foo), Wong's Butler and door opener.
- Wilbur Mack as Ballistics Expert
- Dick Morehead as police detective
- I. Stanford Jolley as Charades Player (uncredited)

== See also ==
- Boris Karloff filmography
