= Margaret Blake-Alverson =

American musician

Pdf of Sixty Years of California Song (readable pdf)

Rosana Margaret Kroh Blake (1836-1923) was a singer, singing coach, and author in San Francisco, California. She wrote Sixty Years of California Song, an autobiography published in 1913. Her students included Lee Tung Foo and Pauline Joran.

She performed on piano for miner guests at her parents home in Stockton. She lived in Boston during the Civil War.

She donated music to the Oakland Free Library. He collection included diaries, musical programs, letters and pictures.

She was born in Mt. Carmel, Illinois to Rev. Henry Kroh and Mary Ann Stouch. She married George Henry Blake September 17, 1857 in Stockton, California. George Lincoln Blake and William Ellery Blake were their sons. She married David William Alverson on November 24, 1875 in San Francisco.
