= Esther Eng =

American film director

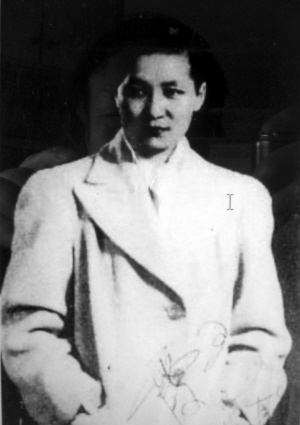
- Eng in 1930
- Born: Ng Kam-ha; September 24, 1914; San Francisco, California, U.S.
- Died: January 25, 1970 (aged 55); New York City, U.S.
- Occupations: Film director; producer
- Years active: 1936–1961

Chinese name
- Traditional Chinese: 伍錦霞
- Simplified Chinese: 伍锦霞
Transcriptions
Standard Mandarin
- Hanyu Pinyin: Wu Jinxia
Yue: Cantonese
- Jyutping: ng5 gam2 haa4

Esther Eng (born Ng Kam-ha; September 24, 1914 – January 25, 1970) was an American film director and the first female director to direct Chinese-language films in the United States. Eng made four feature films in America, and five in Hong Kong. She was recognized as a female pioneer who crossed the boundaries of race, language, culture and gender.

== Early life ==
Esther Eng was born in San Francisco on September 24, 1914. She was the fourth child in a family of ten children. Eng's grandparents originally came to America from Toy Shan (Taishan) county in southern China's Guangdong province. Eng was a fan of Cantonese opera and having lived in San Francisco she was able to socialize with the Cantonese singers and actors who performed there. San Francisco had Chinese-language theaters that were successful and had hosted some of the best actors from China.

== Career ==
When Eng was 19, her father and his business partners created a film production company with Eng as a producer. The studio was based at 1010 Washington Street while Esther looked for a studio in Los Angeles. Esther's first screen credit was as co-producer on the film Heartache (1936). Heartache is set in San Francisco and was directed by Frank Tang, and was shot in eight days, with two reels in color. The film was made at a rented studio in Hollywood. In 1936, along with friends and the film's leading actress Wai Kim Fong, Eng went to Hong Kong for the film's premiere at the Queens Theater under the title Iron Blood, Fragrant Soul.

After China entered into war with Japan, she directed the film National Heroine (1937) about a female pilot who fights for her country. The film was a success which led to Eng staying in Hong Kong where she directed her next two films: Ten Thousand Lovers and Storm of Envy, both released in 1938. She also co-directed the film A Night of Romance, A Lifetime of Regret with Wu Peng and Leung Wai-man. In 1939, she created the film It's A Women's World which had an all-female cast showcasing 36 women in different professions.

In 1939, she returned to San Francisco to begin distributing Cantonese films in both Central and South America. In 1941, Eng directed the film Golden Gate Girl in San Francisco, which received a favorable review in Variety that year. Eng returned to Hong Kong to make a war film between 1946 and 1947. After months of preparation that included location hunting in southern China, Eng had to abandon the project. By mid-1947, Eng returned to California where she made The Blue Jade that starred another Cantonese opera singer, Fe Fe Lee. Eng followed it up with another film with Lee titled Too Late For Springtime (1949) about a Chinese girl's relationship with a Chinese-American GI. This was followed up by a film shot in the Hawaiian Islands titled Mad Fire Mad Love about a romance between a mixed-race woman and a Chinese sailor.

In 1950, Eng stopped making films for a time to go into the restaurant business with her friend Bo Bo, a Chinese actor who had been stranded in New York. Eng supported him and managed his stage career in the United States, and later named a restaurant she co-founded as "Bo Bo". This was the first of her five Manhattan restaurants which included the Esther Eng Restaurant that opened in 1959.

In 1961, she earned her final film credit as the co-director with Wu Peng for Murder in New York Chinatown. She directed all the exterior scenes of the film.

=== Style ===
Eng's films were mostly standard romantic dramas, generally with women at the center. Most of her film productions are lost films except for two: Golden Gate Girl and Murder in New York Chinatown.

== Personal life ==
Eng was openly lesbian. Her sexual orientation did not affect her career negatively, partly because homosexuality was an accepted part of the Cantonese opera, which she was associated with. Around the time that Heartache was released, Esther Eng changed her family name from Ng to the more easily pronounceable Eng.

Esther Eng, aged 55, died from cancer on January 25, 1970, at Lenox Hill Hospital in New York City. She resided at 50 Bayard Street at the time of her death.

== Legacy ==
On April 1, 2013, a documentary about the life and career of Esther Eng titled Golden Gate Silver Light premiered at the Hong Kong International Film Festival. The film was directed by Louisa Wei and was inspired by the 2006 discovery of Eng's photo albums dated between the years 1928 and 1948. During the production of the film, Wei found more albums but no audio or film records of Eng.

S. Louisa Wei's 2014 feature documentary, Golden Gate Girls, compares the media representation of Eng with that of Dorothy Arzner. Judith Mayne, the author of Directed by Dorothy Arzner, is interviewed in the documentary, saying, "I love the fact that history of woman filmmakers now would include Dorothy Arzner and Esther Eng as two of the real exceptions, who proved it was entirely possible to build a successful film career without necessarily being a part of mainstream identity."

== Filmography ==
- Sum Hun (Heartaches) (1936) (producer)
- National Heroine (1937)
- Ten Thousand Lovers (1938)
- Tragic Love (a.k.a. Storm of Envy) (1938)
- A Night of Romance, A Lifetime of Regret (a.k.a. Husband and Wife for One Night) (1938)
- It's a Women's World (1939) (co-directed with Lu Si)
- Golden Gate Girl (1941)
- The Fair Lady in the Blue Lagoon (a.k.a. Blue Jade) (1947)
- Back Street (a.k.a. Too Late for Springtime) (1948)
- Mad Fire, Mad Love (1949)
- Murder in New York Chinatown (1961) (co-directed with Wu Peng)

== See also ==
- List of female film and television directors
- List of lesbian filmmakers
