= This Earth Is Mine (1959 film) =

1959 film by Henry King

- Film poster by Reynold Brown
- Directed by: Henry King
- Written by: Alice Tisdale Hobart (novel); Casey Robinson (screenplay)
- Starring: Rock Hudson; Jean Simmons; Claude Rains; Dorothy McGuire
- Cinematography: Winton C. Hoch; Russell Metty
- Edited by: Ted J. Kent
- Music by: Hugo Friedhofer
- Production company: Universal Pictures
- Distributed by: Universal Pictures
- Release dates: June 26, 1959 (New York City); July 8, 1959 (Los Angeles)
- Running time: 124 minutes
- Country: United States
- Language: English
- Budget: $3.5 million
- Box office: $3.4 million (est. US/ Canada rentals)

This Earth Is Mine is a 1959 American drama film directed by Henry King and starring Rock Hudson and Jean Simmons. The film portrays the lives and loves of the Rambeau family, a California winemaking dynasty trying to survive during Prohibition in the United States.

== Plot ==
Elizabeth (Jean Simmons), an English cousin of the Rambeau family, arrives in California in 1931 for a casual visit with her aunt and uncle, only to find her future pre-determined with a pre-arranged marriage to Andre Swann, a young cousin of another branch of the family. Another cousin, John Rambeau (Rock Hudson), disagrees with those plans, informs Elizabeth that she's being married off to consolidate the family's wine holdings, hints at other dark secrets of the Rambeau family, and casually romances her. Elizabeth is conflicted over the entire series of events.

The patriarch of the family, Phillipe (Claude Rains), wanting to keep the winemaking heritage of his family pure, refuses to deal with bootleggers eager for a ready-made supply of alcohol. John, however, is not so righteous, and arranges deals with Chicago gangsters for the valley's wine supply. Violence, gunplay, and wildfires ensue. Elizabeth is caught in the middle, between Andre, the gentle man she is to marry (but who wants to be a priest) and John, the passionate man ready to make a deal with the devil to survive. And John may already have started a family of his own, fathering an illegitimate child with a vineyard worker—and the woman's husband is not one to go along with the whole sordid mess. Months, and years, of lies, blackmail and conflict follow, ending with the romantic union of John and Elizabeth, and their commitment to the Rambeau winemaking heritage.

== Cast ==
=== Credited roles ===
- Rock Hudson played John Rambeau
- Jean Simmons played Elizabeth Rambeau
- Dorothy McGuire played Martha Fairon
- Claude Rains played Philippe Rambeau
- Kent Smith played Francis Fairon
- Anna Lee played Charlotte Rambeau
- Ken Scott played Luigi Griffanti
- Augusta Merighi played Mrs. Griffanti
- Francis Bethencourt played Andre Swann
- Stacy Graham played Monica
- Peter Chong played Chu
- Geraldine Wall played Maria
- Alberto Morin played Petucci
- Penny Santon played Mrs. Petucci
- Jack Mather played Dietrich
- Ben Astar played Yakowitz
- Dan White played Judge Gruber
- Lawrence Ung played David, the Chauffeur
- Robert Aiken played Tim Rambeau (as Ford Dunhill)
- Cynthia Chenault played Buz Dietrick (as Cindy Robbins)
- Don Cornell played Singer of Title Song (voice)

=== Uncredited roles ===
- George DeNormand played Ronald Fairon
- Tammy Windsor played Clarissa Smith
- Torben Meyer played Hugo
- Emory Parnell played Berke
- Philip Tonge played Dr. Albert Stone

== Production ==
The screenplay for the film, based on the novel The Cup and the Sword by American novelist Alice Tisdale Hobart, was written by Casey Robinson, best known for writing most of Bette Davis' best films. Director Henry King had been successfully directing Hollywood films since the 1920s — this film was one of his last. Film composer Hugo Friedhofer (who had won an Oscar for Best Music for 1946's The Best Years of Our Lives) wrote the music; three-time Oscar-winner Winton C. Hoch was the cinematographer.

The production company was Vintage Productions, in partnership with Universal–International Pictures. The film was Universal's biggest budgeted production at the time with a budget of $3 to $3.5 million.

Casey Robinson wanted to work with director Henry King, who had been under contract at Fox since the 1930s. It was the first film King made outside the studio since he signed with Fox. King called it "rather a pleasant assignment, one of the nicest I have ever had... We started with the picture and had it cut, edited, and ready to show at a press showing in less than six months from the time we started. It just worked out beautifully."

Production dates for the film were September 2, 1958 through early November, 1958. The production was filmed in Technicolor, with monoaural sound. Napa Valley locations used for filming were:

- Beaulieu Vineyard
- Beringer Vineyards
- Cella Vineyards
- Charles Krug Vineyards
- Christian Brothers Vineyards
- Draper Vineyard, now called La Perla and part of Spring Mountain Vineyard
- Inglenook Winery
- Italian Swiss Colony Vineyards
- Louis M. Martini Vineyards
- Mayacamas Vineyards
- Paul Masson Mountain Winery
- Schramsberg Vineyards
- Sebastiani Vineyards
- Stags' Leap Winery (name actually mentioned as part of the plot)
- Sucram Ranch

Local residents of the Napa Valley were used as extras in some scenes, and the stars were taught proper vineyard procedures by locals — a difficulty for left-handed Rock Hudson, for whom a left-handed teacher had to be found to demonstrate the proper way to attach a bud from one plant to the root of another, a scene important to the plot at the end of the film.

The New York opening of the film was June 26, 1959; the Los Angeles opening was July 8, 1959.

== Critical reception ==
The film received mostly negative reviews from film critics. Variety wrote on January 1, 1959, "This film is almost completely lacking in dramatic cohesion. It is verbose and contradictory, and its complex plot relationships from Alice Tisdale Hobart's novel, "The Cup and the Sword" begin with confusion and end in tedium." The New York Times wrote on June 27, 1959. "In describing the intramural trials and tribulations besetting a wealthy clan of California vineyard owners, under the title "This Earth Is Mine," Universal-International has come up with an ambitious family saga as handsome as it is hollow. ... It opened yesterday at the Roxy, where the grapes stole the show." However, the winemaking community appears to have enjoyed it:

- The film gives simple-to-understand descriptions of both the winemaking process and how to taste and appreciate wine. It’s bad melodrama, but it’s first class Napa Valley history.

== See also ==
- List of American films of 1959
