= The Secret Code (serial) =

- Lobby card (courtesy of Cinefania.com)
- Directed by: Spencer G. Bennet
- Screenplay by: Basil Dickey; Robert M. Beche (as Robert Beche); Leighton Brill
- Produced by: Ralph Cohn
- Starring: Paul Kelly; Anne Nagel
- Narrated by: Knox Manning
- Cinematography: James S. Brown Jr. Black and white
- Edited by: Earl Turner
- Music by: Lee Zahler
- Production company: Columbia Pictures
- Distributed by: Columbia Pictures
- Release date: September 4, 1942
- Running time: 275 minutes (15 episodes)
- Country: United States
- Language: English

The Secret Code (1942) was the 19th serial released by Columbia Pictures. It features the masked hero "The Black Commando" facing Nazi saboteurs, inspired by Republic Pictures' successful Spy Smasher serial of the same year. The chapters of this serial each ended with a brief tutorial in cryptography.

== Plot ==
This serial introduces the World War II scenario when a masked hero tries to prevent Nazi agents from crippling the U.S.'s war effort. The spy ring is led by fifth columnist Jensen, who, with his lieutenant Rudy Thyssen and a network of Nazi saboteurs, is trying to get possession of a top-secret formula the United States had developed for manufacturing synthetic rubber while creating explosive gases and radio-controlled bombs to sabotage the exhausting war effort. Police Lieutenant Dan Barton stages a public dismissal from the police department in order to join the saboteurs ring and learn the secret code they have been using. To further assist his efforts (especially after his superior, the only person to know that Barton is working undercover, is murdered), Barton assumes the secret identity of the Black Commando, a masked man who is wanted both by the villains (who want the secret formula they think he has) and police (who are also searching for Barton for murder). Finally, Barton steals the formula and is captured by Thyssen and put under the protection of the sabotage ring. Joining the gang, he learns of their plans, which he immediately leaks to his best friend and former partner Pat Flanagan (and through Flanagan to reporter girlfriend Jean Ashley) and, as "The Black Commando", continually frustrates the Nazi plots. After innumerable dangers and lost efforts in trying to decipher the enemy's secret codes, Barton and Flanagan discover the key to the Nazi code, capture the Nazi ring and make sure that the Nazi U-boat which has been waiting to help the Nazis escape is depth-bombed and destroyed.

At the end of each episode, the audience is given a short lecture on solving complex secret messages.

== Cast ==
- Paul Kelly as Lt. Dan Barton/Black Commando
- Anne Nagel as Jean Ashley
- Clancy Cooper as Pat Flanagan
- Trevor Bardette as Jensen
- Rudolph Anders as Thyssen
- Ludwig Donath as Professor Metzger
- Eddie Parker as Berck
- Wade Boteler as Police Chief Burns
- Frank Shannon as Police Commissioner
- Beal Wong - Quito
- Alex Callam as Investigator Hogan
- Selmer Jackson as Major Henry Barton

== Production ==
The hero, The Black Commando, was patterned after Spy Smasher. Republic's Spy Smasher serial had been released several months before The Secret Code in 1942. Columbia's adverts for The Secret Code included the phrases "Smash spies with the Secret Service" and "Thrill again to spy smashers' biggest chase!"

Each chapter ended with a quick lesson in cryptography and a "brief patriotic admonishment" given by Selmer Jackson. Cline describes this as "propaganda in its basic form...delivered in the most effective way possible - by a respected authority figure in the person of one of Hollywood's most credible actors."

Anne Nagel and Wade Boteler, two of the stars of the Universal serials The Green Hornet (1940) and The Green Hornet Strikes Again! (1941) were reunited in this Columbia serial.

== Release ==
=== Theatrical ===
The Secret Code was released in Latin America in May 1944, under the title La Clave Secreta, in English with Spanish subtitles. This serial also was released as a feature film overseas.

== Critical reception ==
Harmon and Glut consider the serial to be above average for a Columbia production.

== Chapter titles ==
1. Enemy Passport
2. The Shadow of the Swastika
3. Nerve Gas
4. The Sea Spy Strikes
5. Wireless Warning
6. Flaming Oil
7. Submarine Signal
8. The Missing Key
9. The Radio Bomb
10. Blind Bombardment
11. Ears of the Enemy
12. Scourge of the Orient
13. Pawn of the Spy Ring
14. Dead Men of the Deep
15. The Secret Code Smashed

_{Source:}

== See also ==
- List of film serials by year
- List of film serials by studio

Preceded by Perils of the Royal Mounted (1942)	Columbia Serial; The Secret Code (1942)	Succeeded by The Valley of Vanishing Men (1942)
