= Le pillole di Ercole =

1960 film

- Film poster
- Directed by: Luciano Salce
- Written by: Luciano Salce; Maurice Hennequin (play Les Dragées d'Hercule); Paul Bilhaud (play Les Dragées d'Hercule)
- Produced by: Dino De Laurentiis
- Starring: Nino Manfredi
- Cinematography: Erico Menczer
- Edited by: Roberto Cinquini
- Music by: Armando Trovajoli
- Release date: 1960
- Running time: 85 minutes
- Country: Italy
- Language: Italian

Le pillole di Ercole (The Pills of Hercules) is a 1960 Italian comedy film directed by Luciano Salce. It was shown as part of a retrospective on Italian comedy at the 67th Venice International Film Festival. The film revolves around "a sort of miraculous Viagra ante litteram [that] turns a meek newly-wed (Nino Manfredi) into a sex maniac."

== Cast ==
- Nino Manfredi as Dr. Pasqui
- Sylva Koscina as Silvia, Pasqui's wife
- Jeanne Valérie as Odette
- Vittorio De Sica as Piero Cuocolo
- Francis Blanche as Augusto
- Mitchell Kowal as Jonathan Braxton
- Andreina Pagnani as Giovanna
- Piera Arico as Zaira
- Annie Gorassini as Elisabetta Colasanti
- Ljuba Bodin as Catherine Braxton
- Nietta Zocchi as the raped woman
- Franco Scandurra as the hotel doorman
- Oreste Lionello as the hotel porter
- Leopoldo Valentini as the coachman
- Gianni Bonagura as a doctor at the gerontology conference
- Marco Tulli as a doctor at the gerontology conference
- Ignazio Leone

== Production ==
Le pillole di Ercole was the first film Salce directed in Italy following the two films he had directed in Brazil, as well as Erico Menczer's first film as a cinematographer. It was shot between De Laurentiis Studios in Rome and Salsomaggiore Terme between May and July 1960.

== Censorship ==
When Le pillole di Ercole was first released in Italy in 1960 the Committee for the Theatrical Review of the Italian Ministry of Cultural Heritage and Activities rated it as VM16: not suitable for children under 16. In addition, the committee imposed the modification of the following scenes: 1) the scene in which Manfredi and Koscina hug each other on the bed will be shortened; 2) the scene in which Manfredi makes a house call to Valerie (reel 4); 3) the lines in which De Sica says "...I know, when I am with a woman..." until "...a hay barn" must be deleted. Document N° 32710 signed on 3 September 1960 by Minister Renzo Helfer.

== Reception ==
The film was a moderate success, grossing 446 million lire at the Italian box office.
