= Sum Hun =

- Poster bearing the title 鐵血芳魂 (written right-to-left as per custom at the time)
- Directed by: Frank Tang
- Produced by: Bruce Wong; Esther Eng
- Starring: Beal Wong; Kim-Fong Wei
- Cinematography: Paul Ivano
- Production company: Cathay Pictures
- Release date: 30 June 1936 (Hong Kong)
- Country: United States
- Language: Cantonese

Sum Hun (Chinese: 心恨; Jyutping: sam1 han6, or Chinese: 鐵血芳魂, a.k.a. Xinhin or Heartaches) is a 1936 Cantonese-language drama film produced by an American production company in 1936 for a Chinese audience. The film was advertised as the first Cantonese-language film made in Hollywood. The film is believed to be lost.

== Plot ==
A Chinese-American aviator (Beal Wong) falls in love with an opera star named Fan (Kim-Fong Wei) in San Francisco. Unfortunately, a jealous theater manager named Jung intervenes, threatening to send the opera star back to China.

== Cast ==
- Beal Wong as Lee
- Kim-Fong Wei as Fan

== Production ==
In 1936, a young San Francisco woman named Esther Eng (who would later become a well-known director) joined forces with a young actor Bruce Wong to try and tap into the Chinese movie-going market. Together, they managed to raise the money they'd need to get the film made, and then they set to work studying the taste of Chinese audiences. The film was shot in eight days in Los Angeles and San Francisco under Bruce Wong's Cathay Pictures production company. He cast his brother Beal in one of the lead roles.
