= Mitchell Kowal =

Polish-American actor (1915–1971)

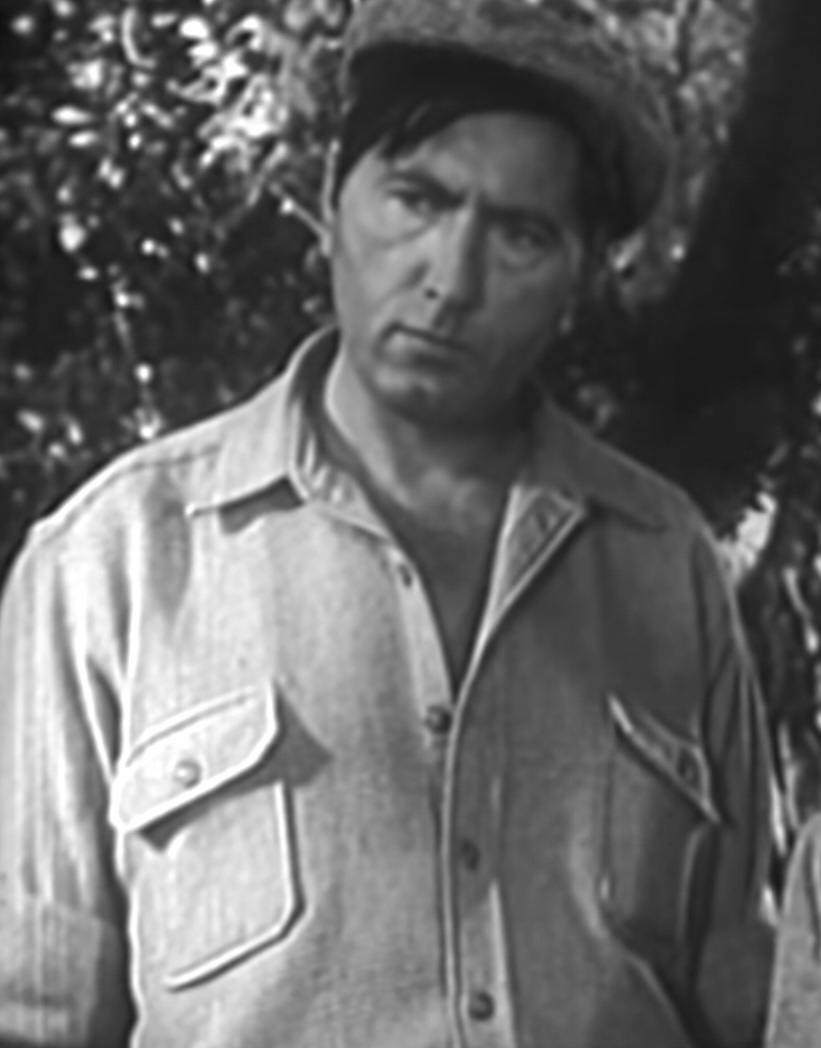
- Kowal in an episode of Medic (1955)
- Born: Mitchell Kowalski; 21 August 1915; Detroit, Michigan, U.S.
- Died: 8 May 1971 (aged 55); Fürnitz, Austria
- Occupation: Actor
- Years active: 1944–1971
- Spouse: Elayne Lingelbach

Mitchell Kowalski (21 August 1915 – 8 May 1971) was a Polish-American actor.

== Biography ==
He was the son of Mr. and Mrs. John Kowalski of Jackson, Michigan.

Kowal's Broadway credits include Collector's Item (1952), Gramercy Ghost (1951), and Horse Fever (1940). In the 1940s, he was active in stock theater in the eastern United States.

In 1951, Kowal married Elayne Lingelbach in New York.

Kowal died in Fürnitz, Austria, in a train accident on 8 May 1971.

== Filmography ==
- 1944: See Here, Private Hargrove - Minor Role (uncredited)
- 1944: Marriage Is a Private Affair - Minor Role (uncredited)
- 1945: That Night with You - Man in Alley (uncredited)
- 1947: Cass Timberlane - Doorman at Country Club (uncredited)
- 1950: The Lone Ranger (TV Series) - Mack
- 1953: Your Favorite Story - Eddie
- 1953: Violated - Mack McCarthy
- 1954: The Public Defender (TV Series) - Detective Jones
- 1954: Rails Into Laramie - Worker (uncredited)
- 1954: River of No Return - Prospector (uncredited)
- 1954: Stories of the Century (TV Series) - Sheriff Bill Joad
- 1954: Francis Joins the WACS - Patrol Leader (uncredited)
- 1954: Rogue Cop - Guard (uncredited)
- 1954: Four Star Playhouse (TV Series) - 2nd Reporter
- 1954: Deep in My Heart - Oscar Hammerstein II (uncredited)
- 1954: The Silver Chalice - Rioter (uncredited)
- 1954: Day of Triumph - Minor Role (uncredited)
- 1955: Crown Theatre with Gloria Swanson (TV Series) - Lawyer
- 1955: The Cisco Kid (TV Series) - Johnny Nestor / Wounded henchman
- 1955: Jupiter's Darling - Sentry (uncredited)
- 1955: The Big Bluff - Coroner
- 1955: Abbott and Costello Meet the Mummy - Policeman (uncredited)
- 1955: The Kentuckian - Frontier Postman (uncredited)
- 1955: Medic (TV Series) - Bartender / Gardner
- 1956: The Great Locomotive Chase - One of Andrews' Raiders (uncredited)
- 1956: Red Sundown - Henchman (uncredited)
- 1956: Dragnet (TV Series)
- 1956: Great Day in the Morning - Mower - Northern Loyalist (uncredited)
- 1957: Maverick (TV Series) - Fred Callahan
- 1957: Official Detective (TV Series) - Samka
- 1957-1958: Tombstone Territory (TV Series) - Slim / Deputy Steve
- 1957-1960: Have Gun – Will Travel (TV Series) - 2nd Cowboy / Jesse
- 1958: The Restless Gun (TV Series) - Waco
- 1958: Live Fast, Die Young - 4th Hobo (uncredited)
- 1958: Man Without a Gun (TV Series)
- 1958: The Rough Riders (TV Series) - Buffer
- 1959: Al Capone - Hood (uncredited)
- 1959: John Paul Jones - Capt. Saltonstall
- 1959: The Jayhawkers! - Governor's Aide (uncredited)
- 1962: Le pillole di Ercole
- 1962: Jadą goście, jadą - Mike O'Rawiec
- 1963: 55 Days at Peking - US Marine (uncredited)
- 1963: Vacation Playhouse (TV Series)
- 1970: FBI – Francesco Bertolazzi investigatore (TV Mini-Series) - Harry Blake
- 1970: Dzięcioł - Edward Ździebko
- 1971: I Hate Mondays (Nie Lubię Poniedziałku) - Mróz (final film role)
