= Bruce Wong =

American character actor

- Born: Tung Soon Wong; March 11, 1909; Los Angeles County, California, USA
- Died: November 1, 1953 (aged 44); Los Angeles County, California, USA
- Occupations: Actor, restaurateur, film producer
- Spouse: Genevieve

Bruce Wong (born Tung Soon Wong) was a Chinese American character actor, filmmaker, and restaurateur who worked in Hollywood in the 1930s and 1940s.

== Biography ==
=== Early life ===
Bruce was born in Los Angeles as Tung Soon Wong to parents who had immigrated to Southern California from China. One of his brothers, Beal Wong, also became an actor.

=== Behind the camera ===
In 1936, after raising money in San Francisco, he made a nine-reel film—Sum Hun (a.k.a. Heartaches)—for the Chinese market, sensing a real opportunity. The Cantonese-language film starred Wai Kim, and was filmed in California under Wong's Cathay Pictures production company during an eight-day shoot. Wong served as producer, and the film was directed by Frank Tang.

=== Acting roles ===
Plans to make subsequent films never came to fruition, and he turned to acting instead. He appeared in a long list of films between 1937 and 1950, mostly in background roles.

=== Personal ===
Wong was married to Genevieve; the pair had several children together. In addition to his work in Hollywood, Wong also owned and operated at least two restaurants in Los Angeles: Chinese Village Cafe, at 745 N. Main St., and the Ming Room, at 358 S. La Cienega Blvd. Chinese Village Cafe was sold right before Wong's death in November 1953.

== Selected filmography ==
As producer:

- Sum Hun (1936)

As actor:

- Appointment with Danger (1950)
- Nob Hill (1945)
- The Purple Heart (1944)
- Up in Arms (1944)
- Destination Tokyo (1943)
- Jack London (1943)
- Behind the Rising Sun (1943)
- We've Never Been Licked (1943)
- Crash Dive (1943)
- Time to Kill (1942)
- Busses Roar (1942)
- Submarine Raider (1942)
- Song of the Islands (1942)
- The Mystery of Mr. Wong (1939)
- North of Shanghai (1939)
- International Settlement (1938)
- Daughter of Shanghai (1937)
- West of Shanghai (1937)
- Devil's Playground (1937)
