= The Seventh Sin =

1957 film by Ronald Neame

- Directed by: Ronald Neame
- Written by: Karl Tunberg
- Based on: The Painted Veil (1925 novel) by W. Somerset Maugham
- Starring: Eleanor Parker; Bill Travers; George Sanders
- Cinematography: Ray June
- Edited by: Gene Ruggiero
- Music by: Miklós Rózsa
- Distributed by: Metro-Goldwyn-Mayer
- Release date: June 28, 1957 (US)
- Running time: 94 minutes
- Country: United States
- Language: English
- Budget: $1,577,000
- Box office: $725,000

The Seventh Sin is a 1957 American drama film directed by Ronald Neame and starring Eleanor Parker, Bill Travers and George Sanders. It is based on the 1925 novel The Painted Veil by W. Somerset Maugham.

== Plot ==
In post-World War II Hong Kong, unhappily married Carol has an affair with Paul, a married man. Her physician husband Walter discovers it and presents her with a choice: travel with him to a remote mainland village (where he will fight a cholera epidemic) or face the scandal of a very public divorce. She persuades him to reconsider, and he proposes an alternative. If Paul's wife will agree to a divorce and if he marries Carol within one week, Walter will obtain a quiet divorce. Carol presents Walter's offer to Paul, who declines, claiming respect for his wife.

Carol sees her only choice is to accompany Walter to the village, where she meets the rakish and booze-soaked consul Tim. He soon introduces her to nuns at the local hospital-convent, and Carol begins to re-evaluate her self-absorbed life and character.

Working at the convent, Carol learns she is pregnant. She tells Walter she's unsure who is the father, and he regrets her honesty. Shortly after, Walter contracts cholera and dies. Carol returns to Hong Kong with an uncertain future.

== Cast ==
- Eleanor Parker as Carol Carwin
- Bill Travers as Walter Carwin
- George Sanders as Tim Waddington
- Jean-Pierre Aumont as Paul Duvelle
- Françoise Rosay as Mother Superior
- Ellen Corby as Sister Saint Joseph
- George Chan as Town Elder
- Mary Chan as Elderly Chinese Woman
- David Chow as Chinese Businessman
- Wong Chung as Elderly Chinese Man
- Judy Dan as Mrs. Tim Waddington
- Leslie Denison as Governor Neville
- Sam Harris as Party Guest
- James Hong as Chinese Officer
- Colin Kenny as Party Guest
- Esther Ying Lee as Secretary
- Gai Lee as Chinese Waiter
- Bruce Lester as Allan
- Edwin Luke as Houseboy
- Owen McGiveney as Butler
- Forbes Murray as Party Guest
- Henry S. Quan as Houseboy
- Jennifer Raine as Other Woman
- Leoda Richards as Party Guest
- George Saurel as Gentleman
- Phyllis Stanley as Dorothy Duvelle
- Frank Tang as Dr. Ling
- Kam Tong as Colonel Yu
- William Yip as Chinese Owner

== Production ==
The film was announced as a vehicle for Ava Gardner.

Producer David Lewis felt the story "needed modernizing and a fresh approach" and had a script done by Arthur Laurents. However the produced claimed director Ronald "Neame, with the backing of Thau, had rejected Arthur Laurents’ script to return to the old hat of Maugham, and Karl Tunberg was assigned to do a rewrite. The whole project was pedestrian and Neame, I thought, was doing a very bad job. He has done fine work on other films, but he certainly didn’t on this one. I don’t think he even understood the story—certainly not Laurents’ conception of it."

Filing started 29 October 1956. Neame left the film during production, and Vincente Minnelli took over and was uncredited. Lewis said that he was kicked off the film and Sidney Franklin replaced him.

== Reception ==
According to MGM records, the film earned $250,000 in the U.S .and Canada and $475,000 in other markets, resulting in a loss of $1.2 million.

== See also ==
- List of American films of 1957
- The Painted Veil (1934)
- The Painted Veil (2006)

== Notes ==
- Lewis, David (1993). Curtis, James (ed.). The Creative Producer. Metuchen: Scarecrow Press. ISBN 0-8108-2720-4.
