= The Big Bluff (1955 film) =

1955 film by W. Lee Wilder

- Theatrical release poster
- Directed by: W. Lee Wilder
- Screenplay by: Fred Freiberger
- Story by: Mindret Lord
- Produced by: W. Lee Wilder
- Starring: John Bromfield; Martha Vickers; Robert Hutton
- Cinematography: Gordon Avil
- Edited by: Terry O. Morse
- Music by: Manuel Compinsky
- Production company: Planet Filmplays
- Distributed by: United Artists
- Release date: June 5, 1955 (United States)
- Running time: 71 minutes
- Country: United States
- Language: English

The Big Bluff is a 1955 American film noir directed by W. Lee Wilder and starring John Bromfield, Martha Vickers and Robert Hutton.

== Plot ==
The suave Don Juan Ricardo "Rick" De Villa and his married lover Fritzi Darvel would like to take off together, but his lack of money prevents them from doing so. A chance encounter introduces Rick to the young but terminally ill socialite Valerie Bancroft, in whom Rick sees the solution to his predicament. Rick sweeps her off her feet and they soon marry, although Valerie's entourage is suspicious of him. Rick then proceeds to try to bring about Valerie's demise so he can inherit her wealth and live the good life with Fritzi.

== Cast ==
- John Bromfield as Ricardo 'Rick' De Villa
- Martha Vickers as Valerie Bancroft
- Robert Hutton as Dr. Peter Kirk
- Rosemarie Stack as Fritzi Darvel
- Eve Miller as Marsha Jordan
- Max Palmer as Detective Sgt. John Fullmer
- Eddie Bee as Don Darvel
- Robert Bice as Dr. Tom Harrison
- Pierre Watkin as Jim Winthrop
- Beal Wong as art dealer
- Rusty Wescoatt as husky detective at finale
- Mitchell Kowal as Coroner
- Jack Daly as Master of Ceremonies

== Reception ==
Variety wrote: "Characters in this meller are mostly stock but the players turn in fair portrayals under producer Wilder's adequate direction. Bromfield is well cast as a wolf who lives by his wits. Miss Vickers is pert and suitably gullible as befits the role. Hutton is forthright as her personal physician. Miss Bowe is plenty sexy as the 'other woman' in the triangle while Miss Miller registers as an amateur gumshoe. Competent support is provided by Eddie Bee and Max Palmer, among others. Camerawork of Gordon Avil is good as is T. O. Morse's editing. An okay score, composed and conducted by Manuel Compinsky, helps sustain the mood of the yarn."

== See also ==
- List of American films of 1955
