= Lü Yan (model) =

Chinese designer and supermodel

- Born: 19 October 1981 (age 44); De'an County, Jiangxi, China
- Other names: Lv Yan
- Occupations: Model, actress, fashion designer
- Known for: Chinese supermodel who became a fashion designer

Chinese name
- Traditional Chinese: 呂燕
- Simplified Chinese: 吕燕
Transcriptions
Standard Mandarin
- Hanyu Pinyin: Lǚ Yàn
- IPA: [lỳ jɛ́n]

Lü Yan (Chinese: 吕燕; born 19 October 1981) is a Chinese fashion designer, model, and actress. During her career as a model she worked with such labels as Dior, Gucci, Lanvin and Alexander McQueen before appearing on the cover of numerous fashion magazines including Marie Claire and i-D. Now retired from modelling, Lü is a fashion designer with her own label Comme Moi.

== Early life ==
Lü was born 1981 in a small mining village in De'an County, Jiangxi Province, China.

== Career ==
In 1999, at the age of 18 Lü was discovered by stylist Li Dongtian. However owing to Lü's unconventional appearance with small eyes, a flat face and freckles she did not meet traditional Chinese beauty standards and found getting work difficult. While in Beijing she was seen by model scouts from France who asked her to go to Paris to model. Lü who spoke no French or English eventually agreed to go to Paris and started work. In the same year she came second in the 2000 Supermodel of the World competition.

In 2006, Lü debuted her film career in 2006 The Painted Veil.

In 2010 Lü returned to China and retired from modelling to set up her own line called Comme Moi for label Woolmark. In 2012, Lü's portrait was on the cover of Elle magazine.

== Filmography ==
- 2006 The Painted Veil - Wan Xi.
- 2010 Hot Summer Days - Supermodel.
- 2010 Color Me Love
