= The Painted Veil (1934 film) =

1934 drama by Richard Boleslawski

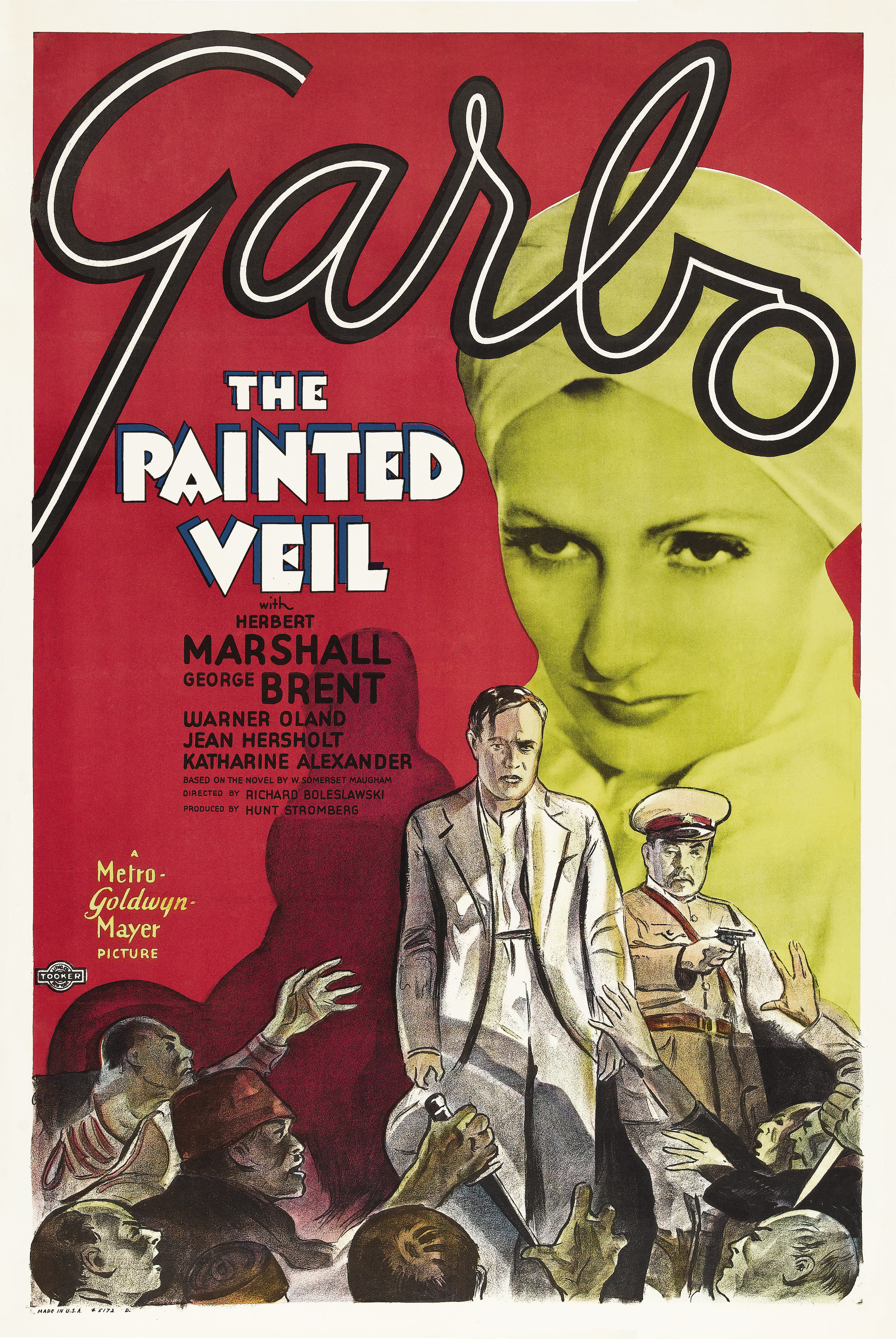
- Theatrical release poster
- Directed by: Richard Boleslawski
- Screenplay by: John Meehan; Salka Viertel; Edith Fitzgerald
- Based on: The Painted Veil; 1925 novel by W. Somerset Maugham
- Produced by: Hunt Stromberg
- Starring: Greta Garbo; Herbert Marshall; George Brent; Warner Oland; Jean Hersholt
- Cinematography: William H. Daniels
- Edited by: Hugh Wynn
- Music by: Herbert Stothart
- Production company: Metro-Goldwyn-Mayer
- Distributed by: Loew's Inc.
- Release date: November 23, 1934
- Running time: 85 minutes
- Country: United States
- Language: English
- Budget: $947,000
- Box office: $1,658,000

The Painted Veil is a 1934 American drama directed by Richard Boleslawski and starring Greta Garbo. The film was produced by Hunt Stromberg for Metro-Goldwyn-Mayer. Based on the 1925 novel The Painted Veil by W. Somerset Maugham, with a screenplay by John Meehan, Salka Viertel, and Edith Fitzgerald, the film is about a woman who accompanies her new husband to China while he conducts medical research. Feeling neglected by her husband, the woman soon falls in love with a handsome diplomatic attaché. The film score was by Herbert Stothart, the cinematography by William H. Daniels, the art direction by Cedric Gibbons, and the costume design by Adrian. The film earned $1,658,000 at the box office.

== Plot ==
After her sister Olga marries and leaves home, Katrin Koerber, the daughter of an Austrian medical professor, fights loneliness and dreams of a more exciting life outside Austria. Consequently, when Dr. Walter Fane, a British bacteriologist, asks her to marry him and move to Hong Kong, she agrees, even though she is not in love with him.

As soon as the newlyweds arrive in Hong Kong, however, Walter becomes consumed with his medical work, and Katrin becomes the romantic target of Jack Townsend, the unhappily married attaché to the British embassy. While showing her the city's exotic sights, Jack flirts with Katrin and kisses her. Katrin, unnerved by Jack's actions, retreats to her house, but soon rejoins him to observe local dancers performing at a Buddhist festival. Stimulated by the dancing and the atmosphere of a Buddhist temple, Jack confesses his love to Katrin, and Katrin admits that she is not in love with Walter.

At home, Katrin treats Walter coolly, saying that his chronic lateness and fatigue annoy her. To make amends, Walter comes home early the next day, but discovers Katrin's bedroom door locked and Jack's hat on a table. That evening, Walter confronts Katrin with his suspicions, and she admits that she loves Jack. Distraught, Walter tells Katrin that he will grant her a divorce only if Jack promises in writing that he will divorce his wife and marry her. When Katrin presents Walter's conditions to Jack, he tells her that a divorce would ruin both his career and his reputation, and backs out of the affair.

Heartbroken, Katrin reluctantly accompanies Walter to an inland region of China, where a cholera epidemic is raging. While Walter struggles to arrest the epidemic, Katrin grows more and more despondent and lonely. Eventually, Walter's inundation in the death and destruction wrought by the epidemic causes him to see his resentment toward Katrin as insignificant. He tells her that he still loves her and will end her suffering by sending her back to Hong Kong, while he prepares to leave for a remote river village that has been identified as the root of the epidemic. She replies that although she is still conflicted in her feelings for Jack, she understands what a good man Walter is and that she's ashamed of having been unfaithful to him.

After Walter has left, Jack realizes his genuine love for Katrin and leaves Hong Kong for the inland. Walter returns from the village after ordering it to be burned to combat the spread of the disease. He is overjoyed to find that Katrin has remained to help young cholera victims at a local orphanage, rather than returning to Hong Kong. Walter is knifed in the melee when villagers riot over having their houses burned, and Katrin rushes to be near him. While waiting to see her husband, Katrin is confronted by Jack, but tells him that she now loves only Walter and at last understands the sacrifices he makes for medicine. After Jack departs, Katrin assures the wounded Walter that she at last has fallen in love with him.

== Cast ==
- Greta Garbo as Katrin Koerber Fane
- Herbert Marshall as Dr. Walter Fane
- George Brent as Jack Townsend
- Warner Oland as General Yu
- Jean Hersholt as Herr Koerber
- Bodil Rosing as Frau Koerber
- Katherine Alexander as Mrs. Townsend
- Cecilia Parker as Olga Koerber
- Soo Yong as Amah
- Forrester Harvey as Waddington

This film marks the uncredited acting debut of Keye Luke, who would later find fame as Lee Chan in the Charlie Chan film series, Kato in The Green Hornet film serials, and Mr. Wing in the Gremlins film series.

Twenty Meglin Kiddies appeared in the film.

== Reception ==
The film grossed a total of $1,658,000: $538,000 from the U.S. and Canada and $1,120,000 in other markets. It made a profit of $138,000.

Andre Sennwald of The New York Times critic enthused over Garbo's performance while recognizing weaknesses in the story: “She continues handsomely to be the world's greatest cinema actress in this...drama...Tracing its ancestry to Somerset Maugham's novel, which it resembles only in the casual surface qualities...(It) allows Miss Garbo to triumph once more over the emotional rubber-stamps that the studios arrange for her...She is the most miraculous blend of personality and sheer dramatic talent that the screen has ever known and her presence in The Painted Veil immediately makes it one of the season's cinema events. Watch her stalking about with long and nervous steps, her shoulders bent and her body awkward with grief, while she waits to be told if her husband will die from the coolie's dagger thrust. It is as if all this had never been done before. Watch the veiled terror in her face as she sits at dinner with her husband, not knowing if he is aware of her infidelity; or her superb gallantry when she informs him of what it was that drove her into the arms of his friend; or her restlessness on the bamboo porch in Mei-Tan-Fu with the tinny phonograph, the heat and her conscience. She shrouds all this with dignity, making it precious and memorable...(A)lthough Mr. Maugham killed the husband off in the book and play, the scenarists keep him alive for an ending in which the couple discover that real love has bloomed out of unbelievable chaos.”

== Other versions ==
Two other films have been based on Maugham's novel. The Seventh Sin (1957) is set entirely in Hong Kong in the aftermath of World War II, and with one exception, the characters' names have been changed. Walter retains his first name, and Katrin has become Carol. The Painted Veil in 2006 retains the 1920s setting and depicts how Katrin and Walter met.

The 1934 film ends with Katrin at Walter's bedside, joyfully proclaiming that she loves him. His wound is not life-threatening, In the novel and in the two later films, Walter dies of cholera, and Katrin/Carol is pregnant. She does not know for certain whether Walter or her lover is the father.
