= The Painted Veil (novel) =

1925 novel by W. Somerset Maugham

- First edition (UK)
- Author: W. Somerset Maugham
- Publisher: Heinemann (UK); George H. Doran (US)
- Publication date: 1925
- Publication place: United Kingdom

The Painted Veil is a 1925 novel by British author W. Somerset Maugham. The title is a reference to Percy Bysshe Shelley's 1824 sonnet, which begins "Lift not the painted veil which those who live / Call Life".

The novel was first published in serialised form in five issues of Cosmopolitan (November 1924 – March 1925). Beginning in December 1924, it was serialised in the United Kingdom in eight parts in [Nash's Magazine, v.74, issue 380 (Dec. 1924) pp.10-87, then monthly until v.75, issue 387 (July 1925), pp. 56-72].

The biographer Richard Cordell notes that the novel was influenced by Maugham's study of science and his work as a houseman at St Thomas' Hospital. In the preface to The Painted Veil, Maugham tells how the main characters originally were called Lane, but that the names were changed to Fane, following the success of a libel case against the publishers by a Hong Kong couple with the name of Lane. The couple were awarded £250. To avoid similar problems after A. G. M. Fletcher, the then assistant colonial secretary in Hong Kong, also threatened legal action, the name of the colony was changed to Tching-Yen. Later editions reverted to Hong Kong but the name Fane was kept for all editions.

== Synopsis ==
Maugham tells the story from a third-person-limited viewpoint, where Kitty Garstin is the focal character. She is a pretty, upper-middle-class debutante who squanders her early youth amusing herself with a busy social life. Her domineering mother attempts to arrange a "brilliant match" for her. By age 25, Kitty has declined a dozen marriage proposals. Her mother, convinced that Kitty has "missed her market", urges her to settle for the "odd" and rather boring Walter Fane, a bacteriologist and physician, who has declared his love for Kitty. In a panic that her younger, less attractive sister Doris will upstage her by marrying first, Kitty consents to Walter's proposal with the words, "I suppose so". Kitty and Walter depart as newlyweds to his post in Hong Kong.

Just weeks after settling there, Kitty meets the married Charlie Townsend, the assistant colonial secretary and a rising star in the British administration of Hong Kong. He is handsome and charming and they begin an affair. She falls desperately in love with him, and believes he reciprocates. Almost two years later, the still-devoted Walter observes them in an assignation. Suspecting they've been discovered, the lovers assure themselves that Walter will not intervene. Since the cuckolded Walter is his administrative inferior, Charlie is confident the bacteriologist will avoid scandal to protect his career. And Charlie promises Kitty that, come what may, he will stand by her. Kitty, who never felt real affection for Walter, senses he is aware of her infidelity, but he refrains from confronting her, and she despises him for cowardice. She starts to discern, however, an ominous change in his demeanour, masked by his scrupulous, punctilious behaviour.

Eventually, Walter speaks to Kitty about the affair and gives her a choice: either accompany him to the remote Chinese city of Mei-tan-fu that is beset by a cholera outbreak, or submit to a public, humiliating divorce for adultery in which Charlie will be named co-respondent. The only way out is for Charlie to announce within a week that he is divorcing his wife Dorothy and will marry Kitty.

Kitty goes to see Charlie who refuses to leave his wife. The conversation unfolds gradually, as she realises he doesn't wish to make a sacrifice for their love, and she grasps his selfish nature. She is surprised to find when she returns home that Walter already has her clothes packed, knowing Charlie would let her down. Heartbroken and disillusioned, Kitty decides she has no option but to accompany Walter to the cholera-infested city.

At first suspicious and bitter, Kitty finds herself embarked on a journey of self-appraisal. When they arrive in Mei-tan-fu, she befriends Waddington, a jaded middle-aged British deputy commissioner who provides her with insights as to Charlie Townsend's unbecoming character. Waddington introduces her to the French nuns who, at great personal risk, are nursing the many sick and orphaned children. Walter immerses himself in managing the cholera crisis. He is held in high esteem by the nuns and local officials because of his self-sacrifice and tenderness toward the populace. Kitty, however, remains unable to feel attraction toward him as a man and husband. She meets with the Mother Superior—an individual of imposing personal force, yet loved and respected—who allows Kitty to assist in caring for the older children at the convent. Kitty's regard for the Mother Superior deepens and grows.

Kitty discovers she is pregnant. When Walter asks if he is the father, she answers "I don't know", although she's fairly certain it is Charlie's baby. She wanted to tell Walter "Yes" but could not bring herself to deceive him again. Kitty has undergone a profound transformation. Shortly afterwards, Walter falls ill with cholera, possibly through experimenting upon himself to find a cure. Kitty comforts him on his deathbed.

She returns to Hong Kong where she is met by the kind-hearted (and still unsuspecting) Dorothy Townsend, who insists that the widowed Kitty—who's viewed in the Hong Kong community as a heroine for selflessly following her husband into grave danger—must not live alone but instead should stay with the Townsends for a while. Despite the awkwardness, Kitty reluctantly agrees. At the Townsend house, much against her intentions, Kitty is seduced by Charlie and makes love with him once more, even while admitting he is vain and shallow, as she once was. She is disgusted with herself and tells him what she thinks of him.

Kitty sails back to England, learning en route that her mother has died. Her father, a successful barrister, is appointed chief justice in The Bahamas colony, and she persuades him to let her accompany him there. She vows to dedicate her life to her father and to ensuring her child is brought up avoiding the mistakes she made.

== Adaptations ==
The novel has been adapted for the stage and film several times:

=== Theatre ===
- The Painted Veil (19 September 1931 – 9 April 1932) at The Playhouse, London

=== Film ===
- The Painted Veil (1934)
- The Seventh Sin (1957)
- The Painted Veil (2006)
