= The Painted Veil (2006 film) =

American drama film

- Theatrical release poster
- Directed by: John Curran
- Screenplay by: Ron Nyswaner
- Based on: The Painted Veil; 1925 novel by W. Somerset Maugham
- Produced by: Sara Colleton; Jean-François Fonlupt; Bob Yari; Edward Norton; Naomi Watts
- Starring: Naomi Watts; Edward Norton; Liev Schreiber; Toby Jones; Diana Rigg; Lü Yan
- Cinematography: Stuart Dryburgh
- Edited by: Alexandre de Franceschi
- Music by: Alexandre Desplat
- Production companies: Bob Yari Productions; The Mark Gordon Company; The Colleton Company; Class 5 Films; Dragon Studios; Warner China Film HG
- Distributed by: China Film Group Corporation (China); Warner Independent Pictures (United States); Belga Films (Belgium); Yari Film Group (Overseas)
- Release dates: December 20, 2006 (United States); December 29, 2006 (China)
- Running time: 125 minutes
- Countries: China; United States; Canada; Belgium
- Languages: English; Chinese; French
- Budget: $19.4 million
- Box office: $26.9 million

The Painted Veil is a 2006 drama film directed by John Curran. The screenplay by Ron Nyswaner is based on the 1925 novel of the same title by W. Somerset Maugham. Naomi Watts, Edward Norton, Toby Jones, Anthony Wong Chau Sang and Liev Schreiber appear in the leading roles.

This is the third film adaptation of the Maugham book. Previous adaptations were a 1934 film starring Greta Garbo and Herbert Marshall, and a 1957 version called The Seventh Sin with Bill Travers and Eleanor Parker. Both prior versions were produced by Metro-Goldwyn-Mayer (since WB's sister company, Turner Entertainment, owns the rights for the first two film adaptations, based on the original novel of the same name).

== Plot ==
On a brief trip to London in the early 1920s, earnest and academic bacteriologist Walter Fane is dazzled by Kitty Garstin, a London socialite. He is smitten, and proposes marriage. After overhearing her mother boasting on the phone about her sister's wedding and wanting to get as far away from her mother as possible, Kitty accepts the proposal. The couple honeymoon in Venice, where Fane struggles to share with her his interests in the city's canals and museums. However, Kitty is more interested in games, parties and dances. They travel to Walter's medical post in Shanghai, where he is stationed in a government lab studying infectious diseases. They are an awkwardly matched couple, with Kitty being more interested in partying, gossiping and socializing with high ranking members of the British expatriate community.

She meets Charles Townsend, a married British vice consul, with whom she has a passionate, clandestine affair. Walter soon discovers the indiscretion, but at first says nothing. He wants to volunteer in a remote area of China to treat victims of an unchecked cholera epidemic. He wants Kitty to come with him. When she makes it clear that she expects him to go alone, he angrily announces that he wants a divorce. Kitty is convinced that Townsend will marry her, and Walter says he will divorce her quietly if Townsend will leave his wife Dorothy to marry Kitty. As Walter expected, Charles is reluctant to commit to Kitty, and the couple start their trip towards the village where Walter will work as a volunteer medic.

The trip is a difficult, two-week-long overland journey to the mountainous inland region. The trip would have been faster if they had traveled by river, but Walter decided against it, wanting to force Kitty to deal with discomfort. Upon their arrival in Mei-tan-fu, she discovers they will be living in a decrepit wooden house some distance from town. Their cheerful neighbor Waddington is a British deputy commissioner living with Wan Xi, a young Chinese woman. Kitty, lonely and bored, writes a desperate letter to Charles and asks Waddington to send it by post. Waddington remarks to Kitty that Charles is a womanizer who has had various affairs with, in Dorothy's opinion, mediocre women. Kitty withholds the letter, realizing she has been deceived by Charles.

Walter and Kitty barely speak. Except for a cook and a local soldier assigned to guard her during unrest due to the Chinese civil war, she is alone for long hours with nothing to do. After visiting an orphanage run by a group of French nuns, Kitty volunteers and is assigned to work in the music room. She is advised not to assist with the patients because their disease is contagious and their suffering is horrifying. As a result of this challenging work, she matures from her spoiled self-absorption. As she learns from the nuns about her husband's courage, dedication, and love for children, Kitty develops a newfound respect for Walter, who begins to realize that she is no longer the shallow woman he married. Their marriage begins to blossom in the midst of the epidemic. She soon learns she is pregnant, but is unsure who the father is. Walter, in love with Kitty again, is hurt, but tells her that the paternity doesn't matter.

The cholera epidemic takes many victims. Just as Walter and the locals are starting to get it under control, due to his creating a system of aqueducts to transport clean water, cholera-carrying refugees from elsewhere arrive in the area, and Walter sets up a camp for them outside town. He contracts the disease and Kitty lovingly nurses him, but he dies, and she is devastated. Bereft and pregnant, she leaves China.

Five years later, Kitty is seen in London, well-dressed and apparently happy, shopping with her young son, Walter. They are picking flowers for their visit to Walter's grandfather. They meet Charles by chance on the street, and he suggests that Kitty meet with him. Asking young Walter his age, he realizes from the reply that he might be the boy's father. Kitty rejects his overtures and walks away. When her son asks who that man is, she replies: "No one important, darling".

== Cast ==
- Naomi Watts as Kitty Garstin Fane
- Edward Norton as Walter Fane
- Toby Jones as Waddington
- Diana Rigg as Mother Superior
- Anthony Wong as Colonel Yu
- Liev Schreiber as Charles Townsend
- Juliet Howland as Dorothy Townsend
- Alan David as Mr. Garstin
- Maggie Steed as Mrs. Garstin
- Cheng Sihan as Warlord Kwei
- Lucy Voller as Doris Garstin
- Marie-Laure Descoureaux as Sister St. Joseph
- Zoe Telford as Leona
- Lü Yan as Wan Xi
- Xia Yu as Wu Lien
- Feng Li as Song Qing

== Production ==
=== Development ===
Before 1999, producer Sara Colleton sought to develop a script for The Painted Veil. The script frequently was redrafted as it was intended both to be close to the source material and to take liberties with the source material, specifically to create a feminist version. Actor Edward Norton became involved with the project in 1999. Norton discussed why he liked the project,

"It's very much a story about people getting beyond the worst in themselves and figuring out how to look at each other honestly, forgive each other for their failings and get to a better place... When I read it, I was very affected by it because in it I saw my own failings."

He suggested casting Naomi Watts for the role of Kitty, but this decision did not take place until after she proved herself a bankable star with her performances in Mulholland Drive (2001) and 21 Grams (2003). When Watts joined the project, she recommended director John Curran, with whom she had collaborated on the 2004 film We Don't Live Here Anymore. The director's expertise with that work convinced Watts and Norton that he would be capable of depicting the dysfunctional relationship in The Painted Veil.

The project began development at producers Bob Yari and Mark Gordon's Stratus Film Company, but when Stratus executive Mark Gill left to start Warner Independent Pictures, he took the project with him. Gill began production of the film in partnership with Yari. Gill was later fired before the film's completion by Warner Bros. production president Jeff Robinov. This was said to contribute to the film's marketing difficulties.

Yari and Warner Independent Pictures collaborated with a Chinese partner who was granted approval over the script and the finished film. The partnership permitted a budget of $19 million for The Painted Veil. When the Chinese production company reviewed the film, its representatives were unhappy with the depiction of the Chinese uprising and the cholera victims, requesting that the scenes be revised. Norton and Curran expressed concerns that their studio accepted the censorship too quickly, with the director threatening to remove his name from the film. Their pressure resulted in limiting cuts from the film to 38 seconds.

=== Writing ===
Screenwriter Ron Nyswaner and Norton collaborated on the screenplay for the film. They considered the 1925 novel by W. Somerset Maugham to be one-dimensional. Norton expanded the character of Walter Fane, giving him an enhanced role. He also had Walter make peace with his wife Kitty, leading to them falling in love with each other. Norton explained, "I like to think that we didn't change the book so much as liberate it. We just imagined it on a slightly bigger scale, and made external some of what is internal in the novel." Norton described the novel as "almost unremittingly bleak" and believed that the author had thought that British colonials were unlikely to change. The actor said of his changes, "I went on the assumption that if you were willing to allow Walter and Kitty to grow... you had the potential for a love story that was both tragic and meaningful." Norton considered The Painted Veil to be in the spirit of such films as Out of Africa (1985) and The English Patient (1996), seeing it as "rooted in really looking at the way that men and women hurt each other".

Director John Curran suggested setting the film during 1925, when the events of the Chinese nationalist movement were taking place. Norton, who had studied Chinese history at Yale University, agreed with the suggestion. To detail scenes from the time period, Curran, Norton, and Nyswaner relied on excerpts from historian Jonathan Spence's 1969 book To Change China, which covered the inept efforts of Western advisers during these years. Norton said that the character Walter Fane served as "the proxy for the arrogance of Western rationalism." He said that Fane was confused when the Chinese were not grateful for his help, saying "Walter means well, but he's the folly of empire, and that adds a whole new dimension to what happens in the story. It's a metaphor for the way empires get crushed."

=== Filming ===
Filming took place on location in Shanghai, China and in a southern Chinese rural village. The director did not want to build a set for the village beset by cholera, and instead sought a rural area in China. He came across the old quarter of Huangyao (黄姚古镇, huángyáo gǔzhèn) in Guangxi Zhuang Autonomous Region, which then served as the location for the village scenes. The director described the location: "Even the Chinese crew members were amazed at the place we found...It was like going back in time." According to Nyswaner, a large amount of time of the film production was spent negotiating with the Chinese government for the completion of the film, as there were disagreements over issues in the script.

Most of the film was shot in Guangxi. Director John Curran said "We wanted this movie to be distinctly Chinese. We didn't want it to look like a film that you could shoot in Canada or Mexico or Italy." Line producer Antonia Barnard states that initially the film, like the novel, was to be set in Hong Kong; however, the crew realized Hong Kong of the time period would be difficult to replicate. They altered the story to set the plot in Shanghai; the crew shot "Shanghai for Shanghai in the period, and shot London scenes in Shanghai as well."

=== Music ===
The official soundtrack was composed by Alexandre Desplat, and features Lang Lang on the piano.

1. "The Painted Veil"
2. "Gnossienne No 1" (composed by Erik Satie)
3. "Colony Club"
4. "River Waltz"
5. "Kitty's Theme"
6. "Death Convoy"
7. "The Water Wheel"
8. "The Lovers"
9. "Promenade"
10. "Kitty's Journey"
11. "The Deal"
12. "Walter's Mission"
13. "The Convent"
14. "River Waltz"
15. "Morning Tears"
16. "Cholera"
17. "The End of Love"
18. "The Funeral"
19. "From Shanghai to London"

There are also three songs not listed on the official soundtrack. All of them are performed by the Choir of the Beijing Takahashi Culture and Art Centre:

1. "Le Furet Du Bois Joli" (Composed by Pierre De Berville, Arranged by Evan Chen)
2. "À la claire fontaine" (Vocals by N. Porebski / L. Descamps, Piano by Roger Pouly, Courtesy of Les Petits Minous). This is heard after the funeral of Dr. Fane.
3. "Reste Avec Moi" (French translation of "Abide with Me", with words by Henry Lyte, Music by William Monk, Arranged by Evan Chen)

== Marketing ==
The film's post-production schedule was slated to conclude in late summer 2006, but did not finish until November. According to Laura Kim, the marketing and publicity head of Warner Independent Pictures, the delay slowed award and media recognition for the film. Other studios were duplicating DVDs of their films for awards organizations, so The Painted Veil was unable to get first priority in processing. When The Painted Veil had a limited release in the United States on December 20, 2006 in the cities of Los Angeles and New York City, the meager marketing campaign for the film was criticized. Half a dozen people associated with the film complained that Warner Independent Pictures conduct of the marketing campaign was failing to gain the film enough attention. Film critic Rex Reed of The New York Observer wrote, "Nobody can understand why Warner Independent Pictures is keeping this movie such a secret; it is filled with Oscar possibilities that should be shouted from the rooftops."

The firing of Mark Gill, one of the initial producers of The Painted Veil and who brought it to Warner Independent Pictures, was cited as a reason for the small scale of the film's marketing campaign. Director John Curran said to Warner Independent "Any transition is not going to be ideal. When the guy who has gotten you on board is gone, you're kind of exposed." Others also criticized the studio for not providing a large enough marketing budget, pointing out that the previous year's Good Night, and Good Luck had a more successful campaign with television and newspaper ads. The Painted Veil eventually expanded to 23 more markets on December 29, 2006, with additional cities on January 5, 2007. Warner Independent hosted 80 screenings of The Painted Veil in Los Angeles, New York, San Francisco, and London as well as to various Hollywood guilds, to promote the film.

== Release and reception ==
=== Box office ===
The Painted Veil initially had a limited release in four theaters in the United States on December 20, 2006, grossing $51,086 over the opening weekend. The film gradually expanded its showings in the United States and Canada, peaking at 287 theaters on the weekend of January 26, 2007. The Painted Veil ultimately grossed $8,060,487 in the United States and Canada and $18,850,360 in other territories for a worldwide total of $26,910,847.

=== Critical reception ===
On the review aggregator website Rotten Tomatoes, 74% of 143 critics' reviews are positive, with an average rating of 71/10. The website's consensus reads: "Visually, The Painted Veil has all the trappings of a stuffy period drama, but Norton and Watts's deft portrayals of imperfect, complicated characters give the film a modern-day spark." On Metacritic, the film has received a score of 69 out of 100 based on 33 reviews, indicating "generally favorable reviews".

Manohla Dargis of The New York Times wrote the story seems

"so unlikely for modern adaptation, particularly when, as is the case here, it hasn't been refitted with a contemporary hook or allegory for audiences who wouldn't know Maugham from Edna Ferber. Instead, as nicely directed by John Curran and adapted to the screen by Ron Nyswaner, this version of the story lulls you by turning Maugham's distaff bildungsroman into a fine romance. Even better, the new film gives us ample opportunity to spend time with Ms. Watts, whose remarkable talent helps keep movie faith and love alive, even in the tinniest, tiniest vehicles . . . An inveterate stealer and masticator of scenes, Mr. Norton is very fine here, especially early on, before his billing gets the better of the story and he begins riding around heroically on horseback . . . Whether through craft or constitution, [he] invests Walter with a petty cruelty that makes his character's emotional thaw and Kitty's predicament all the more poignant."

Carina Chocano of the Los Angeles Times wrote the film "has all the elements in place to be a great epic, but it fails to connect, to paraphrase Maugham's contemporary E.M. Forster, the prose with the passion. It's impeccable, but leaves you cold."

Peter Travers of Rolling Stone rated the film three out of four stars and commented

"If you're suspecting this third movie version of W. Somerset Maugham's 1925 novel may carry the infectious dullness of prestige filmmaking, rest easy...the film is a period piece propelled by emotions accessible to a modern audience...The Painted Veil has the power and intimacy of a timeless love story. By all means, let it sweep you away."

Meghan Keane of The New York Sun wrote the film "may at times threaten to fall into an abyss of sentimentality, and it has moments that seem mere transitions to propel the plot, but it manages a charming historic portrait without insulting the audience's intelligence."

Todd McCarthy of Variety thought the story "feels remote and old-school despite a frankness the two previous film versions lacked." He added

"Present scripter Ron Nyswaner makes some solid fundamental decisions, beginning with the telescoping down to the barest minimum the London-set opening...All the same, the film is still dominated by the stuffy, repressed personality of Fane, whose emotional stonewalling of his wife produces a stifling of Kitty's naturally more vivacious, if common, personality. Despite the extremes of human experience on view, there is a certain blandness to them as they play out, a sensation matched by the eye-catching but picture-postcard-like presentation of the settings...Even the ultra-capable Norton and Watts aren't fully able to galvanize viewer interest in their narrowly self-absorbed characters."

=== Accolades ===
Composer Alexandre Desplat won the 2006 Golden Globe Award for Best Original Score. Desplat also won an award for Best Original Score from the Los Angeles Film Critics Association for both The Painted Veil and The Queen (2006).

Ron Nyswaner won the National Board of Review Award for Best Adapted Screenplay and was nominated for the Independent Spirit Award for Best Screenplay but lost to Jason Reitman for Thank You for Smoking.

Edward Norton was nominated for the Independent Spirit Award for Best Male Lead. The San Diego Film Critics Society honored Norton for his work in this movie, The Illusionist, and Down in the Valley.

The London Film Critics' Circle nominated Toby Jones as Best British Supporting Actor of the Year.

== Legacy ==
In 2024, while promoting Feud: Capote vs. the Swans, Naomi Watts was asked to name her most underrated film and chose The Painted Veil, saying "I thought it was a really lovely film—that nobody saw. It just sort of went by."
