= Beal Wong =

American actor (1906–1962)

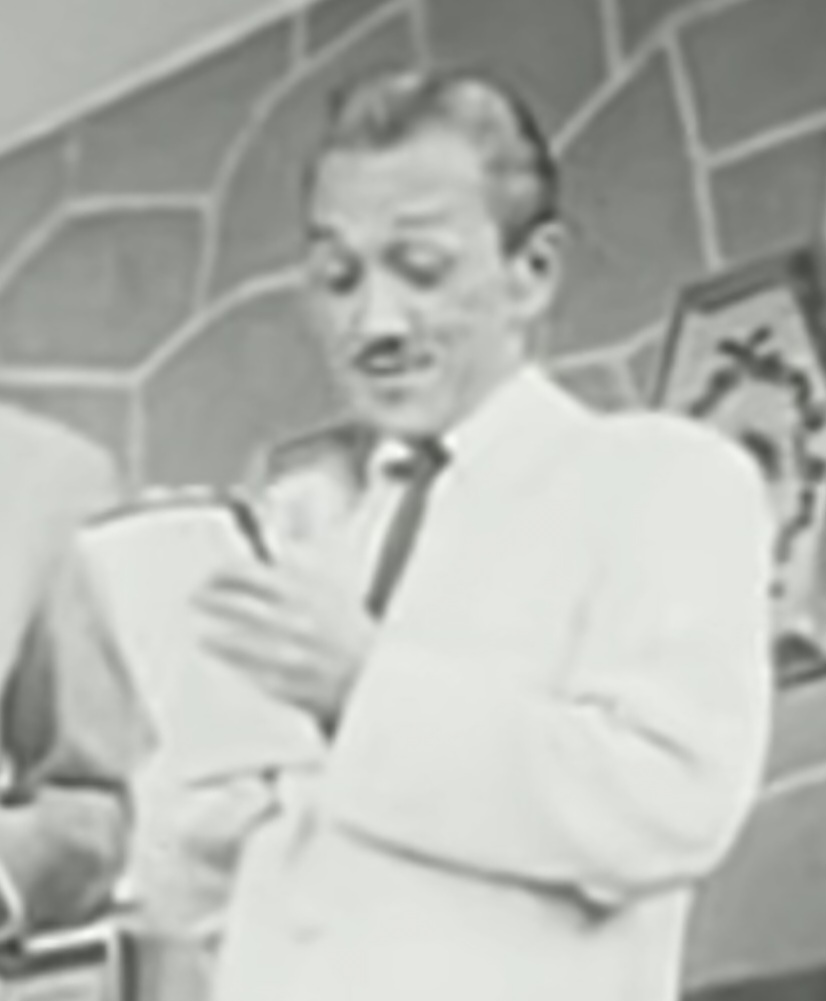
- Wong in The Big Bluff (1955)
- Born: May 11, 1906; Boise, Idaho, U.S.
- Died: February 6, 1962 (aged 55); Los Angeles, California, U.S.
- Occupation: Actor
- Years active: 1933–1962
- Relatives: Bruce Wong

Beal Wong (May 11, 1906 – February 6, 1962) was an American actor from California. Wong acted in films from 1933 to 1962. Some of the films he appeared in were The Big Bluff, China, Women in the Night, Little Tokyo, U.S.A.. He also appeared in The Secret Code. He played the Chinese Radio Listener in Earth vs. the Flying Saucers.

== Biography ==
Wong was born in Boise, Idaho, to parents who had immigrated to the United States from China. One of his brothers, Bruce Wong, also became an actor as an adult.

In 1933, he had a small part in the film Stage Mother. In 1936, he starred in Sum Hun, a film produced by his brother Bruce. In 1944, he played Toma Nogato in The Purple Heart, a film that starred Dana Andrews. He played part in Flower Drum Song in 1961, the Pastor in the 1962 film Experiment in Terror with Glenn Ford and Lee Remick. In the television series The Bachelor Father, he had the role of Peter's Grandpa Ling.

Wong died in Los Angeles, California, on February 6, 1962, aged 55.

== Filmography ==
- 1933 Stage Mother
- 1942 The Secret Code - Quito
