= The Painted Veil (soundtrack) =

The Painted Veil (Original Motion Picture Soundtrack)

Soundtrack album by Alexandre Desplat
- Released: January 7, 2007
- Recorded: 2006
- Studio: Dvorak Hall (Prague)
- Genre: Soundtrack
- Length: 54:35
- Label: Deutsche Grammophon

Alexandre Desplat chronology
The Queen (2006)	The Painted Veil (Original Motion Picture Soundtrack) (2007)	Michou d'Auber (2007)

Professional ratings
Review scores
Source	Rating
AllMusic	link
SoundtrackNet	link

The Painted Veil (Original Motion Picture Soundtrack) is the soundtrack album composed by Alexandre Desplat for the 2006 film The Painted Veil. The album won the Golden Globe Award for Best Original Score.

== Track listing ==
No.	Title	Length
1.	"The Painted Veil"	3:19
2.	"Gnossienne no.1 (Erik Satie)"	3:24
3.	"Colony Club"	2:09
4.	"River Waltz"	2:24
5.	"Kitty's Theme"	3:08
6.	"Death Convoy"	2:50
7.	"The Water Wheel"	6:21
8.	"The Lovers"	1:27
9.	"Promenade"	2:06
10.	"Kitty's Journey"	2:51
11.	"The Deal"	3:23
12.	"Walter's Mission"	3:57
13.	"The Convent"	0:52
14.	"River Waltz (piano solo)"	2:27
15.	"Morning Tears"	1:52
16.	"Cholera"	4:23
17.	"The End of Love"	4:36
18.	"The Funeral"	0:53
19.	"From Shanghai to London"	2:03
Total length:		54:35
