= Target Hong Kong =

1953 film by Fred F. Sears

- Theatrical release poster
- Directed by: Fred F. Sears
- Screenplay by: Herbert Purdom
- Story by: Herbert Purdom
- Produced by: Sam Katzman
- Cinematography: Henry Freulich
- Edited by: Richard Fantl
- Distributed by: Columbia Pictures
- Release date: February 1953
- Running time: 62 minutes
- Country: United States
- Language: English

Target Hong Kong is a 1953 American action film noir directed by Fred F. Sears.

== Plot ==
American mercenaries attempt to stop a spy ring targeting Hong Kong.

== Cast ==
- Richard Denning as Mike Lassiter
- Nancy Gates as Ming Shan
- Richard Loo as Fu Chao
- Soo Yong as Lao Shan
- Ben Astar as Suma
- Michael Pate as Dockery Pete Gresham
- Philip Ahn as Sin How
- Henry Kulky as Dutch Pfeifer
