= Soldier of Fortune (1955 film) =

1955 film by Edward Dmytryk

- Theatrical release poster
- Directed by: Edward Dmytryk
- Screenplay by: Ernest K. Gann
- Based on: Soldier of Fortune; 1954 novel by Ernest K. Gann
- Produced by: Buddy Adler
- Starring: Clark Gable; Susan Hayward; Michael Rennie; Gene Barry; Tom Tully; Alex D'Arcy; Anna Sten; Russell Collins
- Cinematography: Leo Tover
- Edited by: Dorothy Spencer
- Music by: Hugo Friedhofer
- Production company: Twentieth Century-Fox
- Distributed by: Twentieth Century-Fox
- Release date: May 24, 1955
- Running time: 96 minutes
- Country: United States
- Language: English
- Budget: $2.5 million
- Box office: $2.75 million (US rentals)

Soldier of Fortune is a 1955 American adventure film directed by Edward Dmytryk from a screenplay by Ernest K. Gann, based on Gann's 1954 novel. Starring Clark Gable and Susan Hayward, the film follows the rescue of an American prisoner in the People's Republic of China in the 1950s.

== Plot ==
Jane Hoyt arrives in Hong Kong, looking for her husband, reckless photojournalist Louis. He entered Communist China without a visa and was imprisoned as a suspected spy. She sees Hong Kong Marine Police Inspector Merryweather, who found Hoyt's cameras on the junk that took him into China. He can offer little help. During their conversation, he mentions American expatriate Hank Lee, a big name in smuggling and other shady activities.

She decides to arrange his escape, so she contacts Hank. He advises her to give up the foolhardy venture, but she refuses. She foolishly meets Fernand Rocha alone and gives him a $500 deposit to set up a rescue, but he merely gambles the money away and locks her up for his lecherous purposes. Word reaches Hank in time to save her.

Having fallen in love with Jane and realising that she will not let herself get involved with him while her husband's fate remains uncertain, Hank decides to rescue the man himself. Inspector Merryweather is inspecting Hank's boat when Hank decides to make his attempt, and is shanghaied into helping rescue the husband, who is being held in prison in Canton.

Louis is freed. Merryweather is forced to help Hank fight off a pursuing Chinese gunboat with a 20mm Oerlikon cannon concealed belowdecks. When they return safely to Hong Kong, Louis graciously bows out of his wife's life, allowing Hank and Jane to get together.

== Cast ==
- Clark Gable as Hank Lee
- Susan Hayward as Jane Hoyt
- Michael Rennie as Inspector Merryweather
- Gene Barry as Louis Hoyt
- Alexander D'Arcy (credited as Alex D'Arcy) as Rene Dupont Chevalier
- Tom Tully as Tweedie, owner of Tweedie's Bar
- Anna Sten as Madame Dupree
- Russell Collins as Icky, piano player
- Leo Gordon as Big Matt
- Richard Loo as General Po Lin, an impoverished exile who offers to guide Jane to Macao to see Rocha, but is taken off the ferry by the Communists
- Soo Yong as Dak Lai
- Frank Tang as Capt. Ying Fai
- Jack Kruschen as Austin Stoker, Lee's assistant
- Mel Welles as Fernand Rocha
- Grace Chang as prostitute (uncredited)

== Production ==
The film was based on a novel by Ernest Gann published in October 1954. Gann had lived in Hong Kong in his youth working for a telephone company and always wanted to write a book set there. He moved there in 1953, hired a Chinese junk and researched and wrote the novel.

Gann's novel attracted the interest of film studios before it had been published. His novels Island in the Sky and The High and the Mighty had just been filmed with John Wayne and Wayne became interested in purchasing the film rights. However, film rights went to 20th Century Fox, who had a deal with Clark Gable, and Gable asked them to buy the novel as a vehicle for him. Buddy Adler was assigned to produce, Edward Dmyrtryk to direct and Gann to write the script.

Susan Hayward signed to play the female lead after Grace Kelly bowed out. Hayward, however, was in the middle of a divorce and could not take her children to Hong Kong with her. She offered to pull out of the film. Instead, she was allowed to remain in Hollywood and shoot all her scenes on the studio backlot. To give the illusion of her presence in Hong Kong, a few brief outdoor scenes were shot at some of the city's landmarks, showing Gable together with a Hayward double whose back was to the camera. In one instance of this, Gable and the Hayward double were shown entering the doorway of a building in Hong Kong. In the next scene, Gable and Hayward were shown walking onto a Hollywood set that was supposed to be the building's interior.

The opening and closing credit scenes of the film, featuring Gable looking out at the harbor skyline, were staged on the Peak Tram.

David Niven was going to play the police inspector, but then decided he did not want to go to Hong Kong, so the role was taken by Michael Rennie.

The rest of the unit left for Hong Kong in November 1954 for five weeks of location filming. This was the first of four CinemaScope productions filmed by Adler's units in Asia in the mid-fifties.

== Reception ==
Bosley Crowther wrote in The New York Times, "the story cooked up for him [Gable] by script writer Ernest K. Gann is a glib and implausible fiction that would be embarrassing to a grade-B film."

Pauline Kael said that the story material and exotic backgrounds did not support each other.

== See also ==
- List of American films of 1955
