= The Purple Heart =

1944 film by Lewis Milestone

- Theatrical release poster
- Directed by: Lewis Milestone
- Screenplay by: Jerome Cady
- Story by: Darryl F. Zanuck (as Melville Crossman)
- Produced by: Darryl F. Zanuck
- Starring: Dana Andrews; Richard Conte; Farley Granger; Kevin O'Shea; Don "Red" Barry; Sam Levene; Trudy Marshall
- Cinematography: Arthur C. Miller
- Edited by: Douglas Biggs
- Music by: Alfred Newman
- Production company: 20th Century-Fox
- Distributed by: 20th Century-Fox
- Release date: February 23, 1944
- Running time: 99 minutes
- Country: United States
- Language: English
- Budget: $800,000
- Box office: $1.5 million

The Purple Heart is a 1944 American war drama film directed by Lewis Milestone for 20th Century Fox. It stars Dana Andrews, Richard Conte, Don "Red" Barry, Sam Levene, Trudy Marshall, and Farley Granger in an early role.

The film is a dramatization of the "show trial" of a number of US airmen by the Japanese government during World War II. It is loosely based on the trial of eight US airmen who took part in the April 18, 1942, Doolittle Raid on Japan. Three of the eight were subsequently executed and one later died as a POW. This film was the first to deal directly with the Japanese treatment of POWs and ran into opposition from the US War Department, which was afraid that such films would provoke reprisals from the Japanese government.

== Plot ==
In April 1942, after a raid on Japan, eight American aircrew made up of the crews from two North American B-25 Mitchell bombers, are captured. Capt. Harvey Ross (Dana Andrews), becomes the leader of the captives. Initially, the men are picked up by a local government official, who turns out to be a Chinese collaborator in a Japanese-controlled section of China. The collaborator delivers the Americans to the Imperial Japanese Army to be put on trial at the Shanghai Police Headquarters. Although international observers and correspondents are allowed to witness the trial, the commanding officer, General Mitsubi refuses to allow the Swiss Consul to contact Washington.

At the start of the trial, Lt. Greenbaum, an attorney in civilian life, declares the trial is illegal, as the men are in the military service of their country. When the senior officer Captain Ross refuses to answer the demands of the sly General Mitsubi to reveal the location of their aircraft carrier, the general decides to break the men. The airmen endure harsh interrogation and torture from the Japanese guards with Sgt. Jan Skvoznik left in a catatonic state with a persistent head twitch. In court, the men see the pitiful state of Skvoznik. Lts. Canelli and Vincent rush the Japanese general, quickly felled by rifle butts and are returned to their cell. Canelli, an artist, suffers a broken right hand and arm. Vincent ends up in a catatonic state much like Skvoznik. Sgt. Clinton returns seemingly unharmed, but the Japanese have ruptured his vocal cords, and he is unable to speak. The Japanese have a listening device in the cell when Greenbaum repeats what the speechless Clinton writes. If anything happens to Lt. Bayforth, he will tell all. After being tortured, Bayforth returns with his hands and arms useless, covered in black rubber gloves.

In the face of his captives' unshakable resolve and the realization that the Japanese are doomed to destruction, General Mitsubi ultimately chooses to shoot himself. The systematic torture and abuse the airmen endured while in captivity, and the final injustice of being tried, convicted and executed as war criminals is unveiled to the world.

== Cast ==
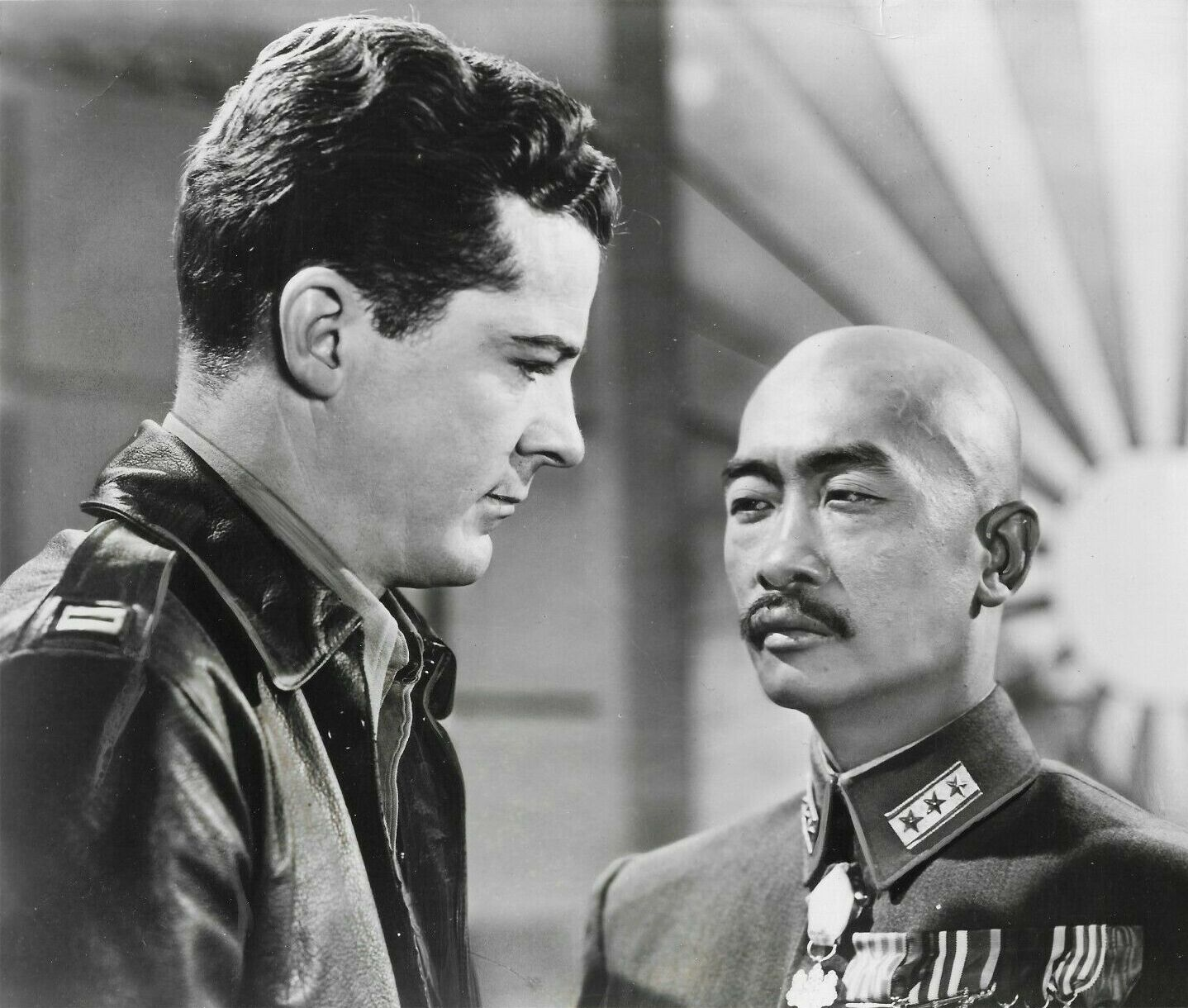
Dana Andrews (left) and Richard Loo

Credits from the AFI Catalog of Feature Films:

- Dana Andrews as Capt. Harvey Ross
- Richard Conte as Lt. Angelo Canelli
- Farley Granger as Sgt. Howard Clinton
- Kevin O'Shea as Sgt. Jan Skvoznik
- Don "Red" Barry as Lt. Peter Vincent (credited as Donald Barry)
- Trudy Marshall as Mrs. Ross
- Sam Levene as Lt. Wayne Greenbaum
- Charles Russell as Lt. Kenneth Bayforth
- John Craven as Sgt. Martin Stoner
- Richard Loo as Gen. Ito Mitsubi
- Tala Birell as Johanna Hartwig
- Peter Chong as Mitsuru Toyama
- Gregory Gaye as Peter Voroshevski
- Torben Meyer as Karl Kappel
- Kurt Katch as Ludwig Kruger
- Martin Garralaga as Manuel Silva
- Erwin Kalser as Schleswig
- Nestor Paiva as Francisco de los Santos
- Hsi Tseng Tsiang as Ling Yuen-chiu
- Benson Fong as Ling Moy
- Keye Chang as Admiral Kentaro Yamagichi
- Allen Jung as Itsubi Sakai
- Beal Wong as Tomo Nagato
- Marshall Thompson as Hank Morrison
- Philip Ahn as Saburo Goto
- Anne Baxter as Anne
- Elizabeth Cooper as Geisha

== Production ==
=== Writing and development ===
Darryl F. Zanuck began writing The Purple Heart after returning from war service in the Army Signal Corps. At the time, the War Department opposed portraying Japanese abuses of Allied prisoners-of-war, fearing it would spark reprisals against other POWs. In fact, the War Department did not officially acknowledge such atrocities until January 1944, a month before the film's release, at which time the ban was lifted.

Zanuck did not initially submit the script to the War Department for approval or cooperation, and kept the set closed to prevent censorship or interference. Zanuck and a team of writers endeavoured to ensure that the story was based on documentation and unofficial collaboration of the torture suffered by the prisoners, and "... should be almost documentary in its honesty ..." In his letter to the War Department, Zanuck cited reports by John W. Powell and Otto D. Tolischus of abuses of American prisoners as the story's documentary basis.

The United States Office of War Information (OWI) reviewed the script and suggested some changes to strengthen the role of the Chinese civilians who had helped the Doolittle Raiders. The War Department objected to the "general tenor of this horror story may have a bad effect on our recruiting program, especially for the seventeen-year-old boys in the cadet plan." Zanuck agreed to add a disclaimer clarifying the film was a fictionalized dramatization. The Production Code Administration objected to a scene where a Chinese rebel kills his collaborationist father, but the scene was included in the film unchanged.

=== Filming ===
Principal photography for The Purple Heart began on October 11, 1943, and continued to mid-January 1944.

== Historical basis ==
Appearing in model form at the beginning of The Purple Heart, the B-25 "Mrs. Murphy" was a fictionalized example of one of the Doolittle Raider bombers.

The Purple Heart was loosely based on the real-life story of eight Doolittle Raiders who were captured from two different crews: Lieutenants Dean E. Hallmark, Robert J. Meder, Chase Nielsen, William G. Farrow, Robert L. Hite and George Barr, and Corporals Harold A. Spatz and Jacob DeShazer. Three Raiders (Farrow, Hallmark and Spatz) were executed by the Imperial Japanese Army, while Meder died of disease in prison.

In September 1945, after the Japanese surrender, the four survivors of the trial were repatriated back to the U.S. Of the four, Chase Nielsen would remain in the service as a career officer, eventually retiring from the U.S. Air Force. Robert Hite would pursue a civilian career while remaining as an officer in the U.S. Air Force Reserve, to include a subsequent 4-year recall to active duty in a flying status. Due to his injuries sustained in captivity, Joseph Barr would be medically retired as an Army Air Forces captain and become a Department of the Army civilian while Doolittle Raider Jacob DeShazer would later return to Japan to be a Christian minister.

== Themes ==
The Purple Heart was a work of wartime propaganda that had a stereotypical portrayal of the Japanese (usually by actors of non-Japanese origin) as sadistic tyrants trying to wrest the secret of their aircraft carrier's location during torture sessions. The 16 air crews did arrive over Japan from the USS Hornet (CV-8). President Franklin D. Roosevelt said the crews came from Shangri-La, a fictional place described in the 1933 novel Lost Horizon by British author James Hilton. The USS Shangri-La (CV-38) was commissioned in 1944.

The Purple Heart concludes with a speech where Dana Andrews as Capt. Harvey Ross declares that he had understood the Japanese less than he had thought, and that they did not know Americans if they thought this would frighten them. (Note: A fictionalized exchange takes place. General Mitsubi tells Captain Ross, "The Japanese people worship the Emperor and will die for him." Mitsubi asks Ross, "is the white man willing to make the sacrifices of the Japanese people in total war." After news arrives of the "Fall of Corregidor on May 6, 1942, the Imperial Japanese Army and Navy celebrate with a gleeful sword dance. General Mitsubi tells Captain Ross that General MacArthur is a coward to leave his defeated forces. Ross says, "General MacArthur has his orders, we have ours.")

At the time of its release, the war in the Pacific was still raging and there was little concern for such excesses. The December 7, 1941, Japanese attack on Pearl Harbor was still fresh in the minds of the American public. In later years, many of the principal players, including Dana Andrews, came to express regret over the more distasteful aspects of the film.

== Reception ==
Released during the war, The Purple Heart inspired theatre patrons to purchase thousands of dollars of War Bonds, and opened to good reviews. The review in Variety reflected the times; "... an intensely moving piece, spellbinding, though gory at times, gripping and suspenseful for the most part." Bosley Crowther, the film reviewer of The New York Times, cautiously endorsed the film's patriotic message. "... an overpowering testimonial it is, too—a splendid tribute to the bravery of young men who have maintained their honor and dignity despite the brutal tortures of the Japanese; and a shocking and debasing indictment of the methods which our enemies have used. Americans cannot help but view this picture with a sense of burning outrage—and hearts full of pride and admiration for our men who have so finely fought and died." Harrison's Reports wrote, "A powerful drama, it grips one throughout." David Lardner of The New Yorker called "impressive" the "sheer imagination called for" to make a film about an event that happened in a country at a time when it could not be filmed on location. He also praised the performances of the leads as "convincing". However, he identified a drawback in that the film's events were overly "squeezed into too small a confinement of space and time" in order to serve dramatic purposes.
