= Sin Town (1942 film) =

1942 film by Ray Enright

- Directed by: Ray Enright
- Written by: Richard Brooks; Gerald Geraghty; Scott Darling
- Produced by: George Waggner
- Starring: Constance Bennett; Broderick Crawford; Patric Knowles; Anne Gwynne; Leo Carrillo; Andy Devine; Ward Bond
- Cinematography: George Robinson
- Edited by: Edward Curtiss
- Music by: Hans J. Salter
- Production company: Universal Pictures
- Distributed by: Universal Pictures
- Release date: September 25, 1942
- Running time: 73 minutes
- Country: United States
- Language: English

Sin Town is a 1942 American Western film directed by Ray Enright and starring Constance Bennett, Broderick Crawford and Patric Knowles. It is set during the Texas Oil Boom of the early 20th century. The trio of director Enright, Crawford and Gwynne collaborated on another film the same year, Men of Texas, which also revolves, to some extent, around the newspaper industry.

== Plot ==
In 1910, Laura Kirby is the editor of a local newspaper in a frontier town. She finds herself at odds with the devious Dude McNair and his accomplice, Kye Allen. The duo quickly embeds themselves in the town's sole gambling hub after forcibly ousting its owner, Rock Delaney. Nonetheless, Delaney, backed by his crew, makes a comeback, prompting McNair and Allen to seek opportunities elsewhere.

== Cast ==
- Constance Bennett as Kye Allen
- Broderick Crawford as Martin "Dude" McNair
- Patric Knowles as Wade Crowell
- Anne Gwynne as Laura Kirby
- Leo Carrillo as Angelo Collina
- Andy Devine as Judge Eustace Vale
- Ward Bond as Rock Delaney
- Arthur Aylesworth as Sheriff Bagby
- Ralf Harolde as Kentucky Jones
- Charles Wagenheim as Dry-Hole
- Billy Wayne as Slim Hollister
- Hobart Bosworth as Humiston
- Bryant Washburn as Anderson
- Jack Mulhall as Hanson

== Production ==
According to The New York Times on July 31, 1942, Universal has signed Constance Bennett to play the female lead Kye Allen in Sin Town, a story of an oil-boom community, and the movie originally was planned for Marlene Dietrich. The cast included Broderick Crawford, Andy Devine and Leo Carrillo.

== Bibliography ==
- Kellow, Brian. The Bennetts: An Acting Family. University Press of Kentucky, 2004.
