= She-Wolf of London =

She-Wolf of London may refer to:

- She-Wolf of London (film), 1946 American mystery and horror film
- She-Wolf of London (TV series), American television series
