= Corregidor (disambiguation) =

Corregidor is an island in the Philippines.

Corregidor may also refer to:

- Corregidor (position), a Spanish judicial or administrative position
- The Battle of Corregidor (1942), the World War II battle in which Japan took control of Corregidor Island, leading to the capture and occupation of the Philippines by Japan
- The Battle of Corregidor (1945), the subsequent World War II battle in which the U.S. and Filipino troops regained control of Corregidor Island from Japan
- Corregidor (film), a 1943 American film directed by William Nigh
- Der Corregidor, a comic opera by Hugo Wolf
- SS Corregidor, a Philippines owned steamship sunk during World War II, originally HMS Engadine
