= Jan Wiley =

American actress (1916–1993)

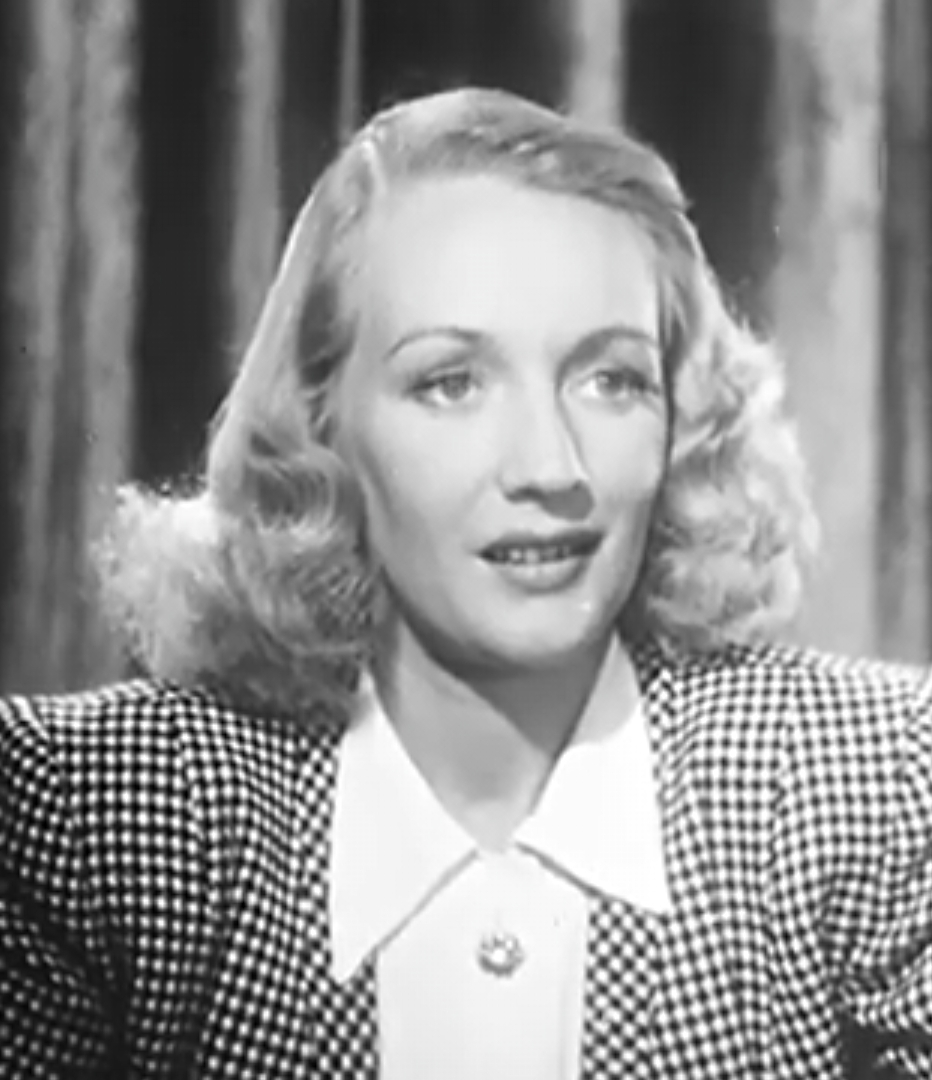
- Wiley in A Fig Leaf for Eve (1944)
- Born: Jan Harriet Wiley; February 21, 1916; Marion, Indiana, U.S.
- Died: May 26, 1993 (aged 77); Rancho Palos Verdes, California, U.S.
- Other name: Harriet Brandon
- Occupation: Actress
- Years active: 1937–1946
- Spouse(s): Roger Wister Clark (m. 19??; div. 1945) Mort Green (m. 1947; div. 1971)
- Children: 2

Jan Wiley (February 21, 1916 – May 26, 1993) was an American film actress.

== Early years ==
Wiley was born Jan Harriet Wiley in Marion, Indiana and early in her career was billed as Harriet Brandon.

== Film ==
Beginning in 1937 with New Faces of 1937 and Stage Door, Wiley appeared in 39 films in a mixture of lead, supporting, and minor roles in Hollywood B Movies. She had a rare leading role as the title character in A Fig Leaf for Eve (1944) but is probably best remembered for the 1946 horror film She-Wolf of London.

== Personal life ==
Wiley was married to actor Roger Wister Clark; they were divorced on July 19, 1945. She retired from acting after marrying Mort Green in 1947. They had two children and were divorced in 1971.

== Death ==
On May 27, 1993, Wiley died of cancer at a retirement home in Rancho Palos Verdes, California. She was 77. Her body was cremated, and her ashes were scattered at sea off San Pedro, California.

== Selected filmography ==
- New Faces of 1937 (1937) - Showgirl
- Stage Door (1937) - Madeline
- Kitty Foyle (1940) - Miss Bala - Office Worker (uncredited)
- Citizen Kane (1941) - Reporter at Xanadu (uncredited)
- Tonto Basin Outlaws (1941) - Jane Blanchard
- Zis Boom Bah (1941) - Annabella
- Dick Tracy vs. Crime Inc. (1941) - June 'Eve' Chandler
- Thunder River Feud (1942) - Maybelle Pembroke
- The Strange Case of Doctor Rx (1942) - Lily (uncredited)
- You're Telling Me (1942) - Girl Announcer (uncredited)
- Almost Married (1942) - Louella Marvin
- Top Sergeant (1942) - Army Press Photographer (uncredited)
- Parachute Nurse (1942) - Tenderfoot (uncredited)
- City of Silent Men (1942) - Jane Muller
- Criminal Investigator (1942) - Harriet Drake
- The Living Ghost (1942) - Tina Craig
- Rhythm Parade (1942) - Connie
- Dawn on the Great Divide (1942) - Martha Corkle (uncredited)
- Gals, Incorporated (1943) - Showgirl (uncredited)
- Fired Wife (1943) - Leading Lady (uncredited)
- So Proudly We Hail! (1943) - Lt. Lynne Hopkins (uncredited)
- The Underdog (1943) - Ämy Tate
- Never a Dull Moment (1943) - Checkroom Girl (uncredited)
- Jive Junction (1943) - Miss Forbes
- Law Men (1944) - Phyliss
- Follow the Boys (1944) - Phone Operator (uncredited)
- San Diego, I Love You (1944) - Receptionist (uncredited)
- A Fig Leaf for Eve (1944) - Eve Lorraine / Eve Westland
- Adventures of Kitty O'Day (1945) - Carla Brant
- There Goes Kelly (1945) - Rita Wilson a.k.a. Gladys Wharton
- The Cisco Kid Returns (1945) - Jeanette
- The Master Key (1945) - Janet Lowe
- Secret Agent X-9 (1945) - Lynn Moore
- Frontier Gal (1945) - Sheila Winthop
- I Ring Doorbells (1946) - Helen Carter
- She-Wolf of London (1946) - Carol Winthrop
- Below the Deadline (1946) - Vivian Saunders
- The Brute Man (1946) - Virginia Rogers Scott
- The Best Years of Our Lives (1946) - Perfume Saleswoman (uncredited) (final film role)

== Bibliography ==
- Tom Weaver, Michael Brunas & John Brunas. Universal Horrors: The Studio's Classic Films, 1931-1946. McFarland, 1990.
