= Where Are Your Children? =

1943 film by William Nigh

- Theatrical release poster
- Directed by: William Nigh
- Screenplay by: Hilary Lynn; George Wallace Sayre
- Story by: Hilary Lynn
- Produced by: Jeffrey Bernerd
- Starring: Jackie Cooper; Gale Storm; Patricia Morison; John Litel; Gertrude Michael; Anthony Warde
- Cinematography: Mack Stengler; Ira H. Morgan
- Edited by: Richard C. Currier; W. Duncan Mansfield
- Production company: Monogram Pictures
- Distributed by: Monogram Pictures
- Release date: November 26, 1943
- Running time: 73 minutes
- Country: United States
- Language: English
- Budget: less than $250,000
- Box office: more than $600,000

Where Are Your Children? is a 1943 American crime film directed by William Nigh and written by Hilary Lynn and George Wallace Sayre. The film stars Jackie Cooper, Gale Storm, Patricia Morison, John Litel, Gertrude Michael and Anthony Warde. The film was released on November 26, 1943, by Monogram Pictures.

== Plot ==
Hip music and singing about kids getting into trouble, sneaking booze into clubs, stealing car, fight between girls, romance starts then guy goes in the Navy.

== Cast ==
- Jackie Cooper as Danny Cheston
- Gale Storm as Judy Lawson
- Patricia Morison as Linda Woodford
- John Litel as Judge Edmonds
- Gertrude Michael as Nell Lawson
- Anthony Warde as Jim Lawson
- Evelyn Eaton as Opal Becker
- Addison Richards as Halstead
- Sarah Edwards as Matron
- Betty Blythe as Mrs. Cheston
- Jimmy Zahner as Jerry Doane
- Charles Williams as Mack
- Herbert Rawlinson as Brooks the Butler
- John Laurenz as Petty Officer Jones
- Neyle Morrow as Herb Walsh

== Reception ==
Steve Broidy said it turned out to be a "big, big grossing picture."
