= The Blue Streak (1917 film) =

1917 film

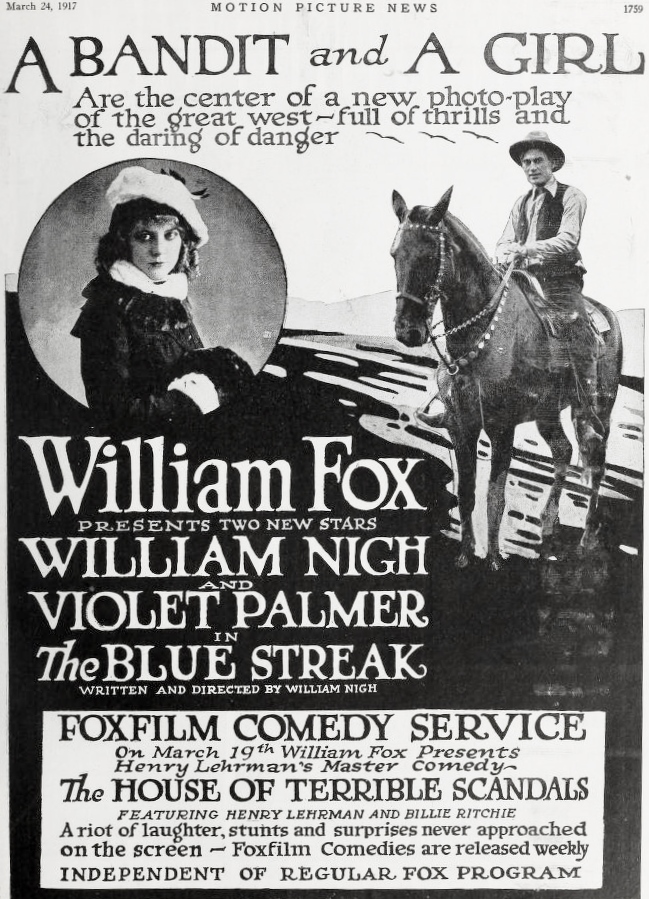
- Directed by: William Nigh
- Written by: William Nigh
- Starring: William Nigh; Violet Palmer; Ruth Thorp
- Cinematography: Joseph Ruttenberg
- Production company: Fox Film
- Distributed by: Fox Film
- Release date: March 19, 1917
- Running time: 50 minutes
- Country: United States
- Languages: Silent; English intertitles

The Blue Streak is a 1917 American silent Western film directed by William Nigh and starring Nigh, Violet Palmer and Ruth Thorp.

== Cast ==
- William Nigh as The Blue Streak
- Violet Palmer as The Fledgeling
- Ruth Thorp as The Bar Fly
- Martin Faust as Half-and-Half
- Ned Finley as The Sheriff
- Edward Roseman as Butch
- Tom Cameron
- Danny Sullivan
- Edgar Kennedy
- Bert Gudgeon
- Marc B. Robbins

== Preservation ==
With no holdings located in archives, The Blue Streak is considered a lost film.

== Bibliography ==
- Solomon, Aubrey. The Fox Film Corporation, 1915-1935: A History and Filmography. McFarland, 2011.
