= Bruce Edwards (actor) =

American actor and photographer (1911–2002)

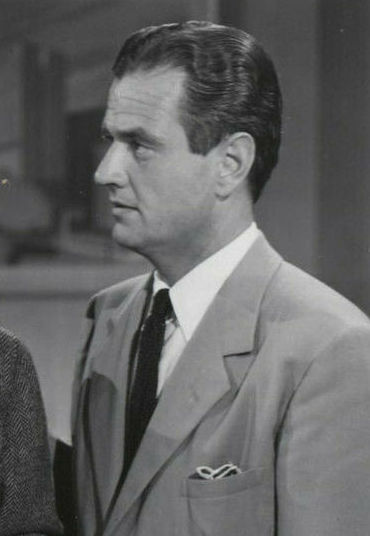
- Edwards in Prejudice (1949)
- Born: Edward Lester Smith; October 8, 1911; Los Angeles, California, U.S.
- Died: September 20, 2002 (aged 90); Thousand Oaks, California, U.S.
- Occupation(s): Actor, photographer
- Spouses: Virginia Brand Andrews (m. 1936; died 1984) Edith Joyce Birdwell (m. 1987)

Edward Lester Smith (October 8, 1911 – September 20, 2002), stage name Bruce Edwards, was an American actor and photographer. He primarily played supporting roles in Hollywood films and film serials of the 1940s and early 1950s. After retiring in 1953, he pursued a photography career. A yachting enthusiast, he was also the owner-director of a summer camp for boys.

== Early life and education ==
Edward Lester Smith was born on October 8, 1911, in Los Angeles, California. His parents were Clarence F. Smith and Susan Lotta. His father, a captain in the American Expeditionary Forces in World War I, was killed in action in 1918. He was raised by his mother. He graduated from Los Angeles High School and Menlo College.

== Career ==
=== Actor ===
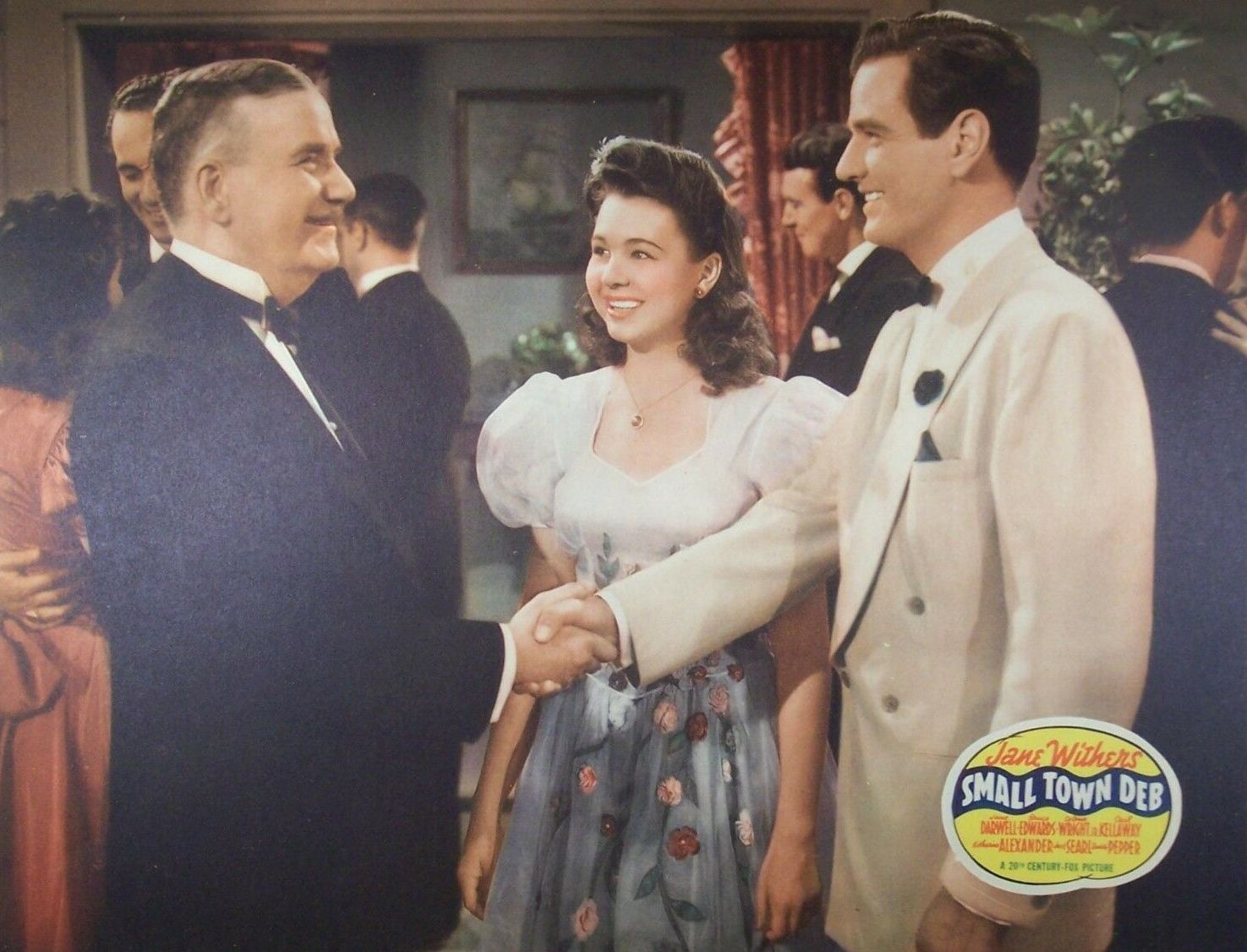
Edwards (right) with Jane Withers and Douglas Wood in Small Town Deb (1941)

Using the stage name Bruce Edwards, he made his film debut in an uncredited role in Flight Command (1940). After several more uncredited appearances, he landed the male lead opposite Jane Withers in Small Town Deb (1942). After that he was mainly tapped for supporting roles, with the notable exception of starring as Stephen Colt in Republic Pictures' film serial The Black Widow (1947). Mayer compared the quality of Edwards' repartee with co-star Virginia Lindley to the verbal sparring between Cary Grant and Rosalind Russell in His Girl Friday (1940). Edwards appeared in two other film serials, including as the villainous Professor Paul Williams in the first six chapters of Federal Agents vs. Underworld, Inc (1948). At the end of his career he acted in low-budget westerns. He retired from Hollywood in 1953, but continued to make occasional guest appearances in film and television.

=== Photographer ===
Based in Newport Beach, California, Smith worked as a photographer. He photographed covers and articles for the Los Angeles Times's Home magazine. He and his wife also wrote for the Sea Larking column in the Daily Pilot and Bay Window for the Balboa Bay Club, a private yacht club.

== Personal life ==
In March 1936, Smith married Virginia Brand Andrews, who had a daughter from a previous marriage. The couple's only child, Edward Lester Smith Jr., died one day after birth in July 1942 due to a cerebral hemorrhage. Virginia was often mentioned in the local press for her social and fundraising activities. Virginia died in 1984. In March 1987, Smith remarried to Edith Joyce Birdwell, who survived him.

A long-time resident of Lido Isle, Newport Beach, and La Quinta, California, Smith was a yachting enthusiast. He spent summers with his family aboard his 26 ft (7.9 m) sloop Typee in Cherry Cove, Catalina Island. He sold Typee in 1959, and in 1970 purchased a sloop named Sea Spree.

In 1959 he and his first wife opened the Catalina Marineros Camp in Fourth of July Cove, Catalina Island. A 1960 ad for the camp for boys ages 7 to 16 described the activities as "outboarding, sailing and marinero's skills plus riding, swimming, hiking, tennis, baseball and other sports". Smith and his first wife were avid tennis players as well.

Smith died on September 20, 2002, aged 90, in Thousand Oaks. No funeral services were conducted; he was cremated and his ashes strewn at sea near Cherry Cove.

== Filmography ==
Film
Year	Title	Role	Notes
1941	Marry the Boss's Daughter	Jefferson Cole	
1941	Small Town Deb	Jack Richards	
1941	Sun Valley Serenade	Ski instructor	
1942	The Great Gildersleeve	Governor's secretary	
1942	Moontide	Man	
1943	Petticoat Larceny	Man answering telephone	
1943	Flight for Freedom	Flyer	
1943	Hitler – Dead or Alive	Johnny Stevens	
1943	The Iron Major	Lieutenant Jones	
1943	The Fallen Sparrow	Ab Parker	
1943	Seven Miles from Alcatraz	Nick	
1943	Bombardier	Lieutenant Ellis	
1943	Gangway for Tomorrow	Rogan	
1943	The Falcon in Danger	Mechanic	
1944	Government Girl	FBI agent	
1944	Bride by Mistake	Chaplain	
1944	My Pal Wolf	Paul Anstey	
1945	A Game of Death	Collins	
1945	Betrayal from the East	Purdy	
1945	West of the Pecos	Clyde Corbin	
1945	Dick Tracy	Sergeant	
1945	First Yank into Tokyo	Captain Harris	
1945	Sing Your Way Home	Chaplain	
1946	Dangerous Money	Harold Mayfair	
1946	Below the Deadline	Sam Austin	
1946	Bedlam	Warden	
1946	So Goes My Love	Weldon	
1946	The Bamboo Blonde	Lieutenant	
1946	Ding Dong Williams	Director	
1947	Queen of the Amazons	Greg Jones	
1947	The Black Widow	Stephen Colt	Film serial
1948	The Denver Kid	Lt. Fletcher "Fletch" Roberts	
1948	Federal Agents vs. Underworld, Inc	Professor Paul Williams	Film serial – Chapters 1–6
1949	Powder River Rustlers	Bob Manning	
1949	Prejudice	Al Green	
1949	Bruce Gentry – Daredevil of the Skies		Film serial
1950	Sands of Iwo Jima	Marine	
1950	The Great Plane Robbery		
1951	Fort Dodge Stampede	Jeff Bryan	
1951	Lawless Cowboys	Bob Rank	
1951	Oklahoma Justice	Jimmy Redding	
1951	Captain Video: Master of the Stratosphere	Agent 34	Film serial – Chapter 4 (uncredited)
1952	Confidence Girl	1st detective	
1952	Montana Incident	Benson	
1953	So This Is Love	Minister	
1953	The Story of Three Loves	Chorus boy	
1964	The Cool World	Warrior	
1986	Youngblood	Thunder Bay trainer	

Television
Year	Title	Role	Notes
1951	Adventures of Wild Bill Hickok	Bart York	Season 2, episode 10: "Ex-Convict Story"
1952	Adventures of Wild Bill Hickok	Whitey Peters	Season 3, episode 15: "The Boy and the Bandit"
1952	Death Valley Days	Death Valley Kid	Season 1, Episode 3: "The Death Valley Kid"
1953	The Lone Ranger		Episode: "The Devil's Bog"
1971	Ironside	Jury Foreman	Episode: "The Riddle in Room Six"

== Sources ==
- Gianakos, Larry James (1992). Television Drama Series Programming: A Comprehensive Chronicle, 1984-1986. Vol. 6. Scarecrow Press. ISBN 9780810826014.
- Library of Congress (1953), "Motion Pictures and Filmstrips", Catalog of Copyright Entries: Third series, p. 11
- Mayer, Geoff (2017). Encyclopedia of American Film Serials. McFarland. ISBN 978-1-476-62719-9.
