= Killer Dill =

1947 film by Lewis D. Collins

- Theatrical release poster
- Directed by: Lewis D. Collins
- Written by: Alan Friedman (story); John O'Dea (writer)
- Produced by: Max M. King
- Starring: Stuart Erwin; Anne Gwynne
- Cinematography: William A. Sickner
- Edited by: Martin G. Cohn
- Music by: John Thompson
- Production company: Nivel Pictures Corporation
- Distributed by: Screen Guild
- Release date: 2 August 1947
- Running time: 75 minutes
- Country: United States
- Language: English

Killer Dill is a 1947 American comedy film directed by Lewis D. Collins and starring Stuart Erwin, Anne Gwynne and Frank Albertson. It set in 1931 during the Prohibition Era.

== Plot ==
Johnny Dill, a lingerie salesman, loses his girlfriend Judy Parker to his longtime friend, the charming lawyer William T. Allen. When he takes his assistant, Millie Gardner, to a movie, all she talks about is the manly gangster hero, Big Nick Maronie. Discouraged that every woman seems to want something different from what he offers, Johnny decides to change his ways and become more of a tough gangster to improve his chances.

Johnny drops into a bar and plays out his new act in full, upsetting the Big Nick Maronie, who is considered to be "public enemy number 21." Big Nick has a beef with "public enemy number 24", Maboose, but when he sends his goon Little Joe to deal with him, Little Joe kills Big Nick instead in the gangster's own apartment, which is just across the hall from Johnny's. Little Joe doesn't know how to dispose of the body, so he puts it in one of Johnny's lingerie trunks.

Johnny finds the body, puts it in a car and drives off. The body falls out of the car when Johnny is chased by police. Everyone thinks Johnny is the one who offed Big Nick, and all over the news he is called "Killer Dill." Eventually he comes out of his hiding and a trial ensues. He is defended by his old friend William, and is found not guilty.

Everyone still believes he is the killer., He is now known as "public enemy number 21" after the person he supposedly killed. Big Nick's brother Louie is eager to get revenge. Johnny tries to team up with Maboose for protection. Little Joe is also making a deal with Maboose to get rid of Louie. Before Louie is killed, Johnny bumps into Little Joe and threatens him with a toy gun. Johnny makes him write a statement taking responsibility for the murder. Little Joe discovers that the gun is a toy and starts strangling Johnny, but Louie comes to the rescue. Little Joe is thrown out the window.

William, who has worked for Maboose all along, makes Johnny destroy the statement to not incriminate his boss. Judy finally sees what a stand-up guy Johnny really is. She breaks off her engagement to William, then proposes to Johnny.

== Cast ==
- Stuart Erwin as Johnny 'Killer' Dill
- Anne Gwynne as Judy Parker
- Frank Albertson as William T. Allen
- Mike Mazurki as Little Joe
- Milburn Stone as Maboose
- Dorothy Granger as Millie Gardner
- Anthony Warde as Louie Maronie
- Dewey Robinson as McGowan, house detective
- Ben Welden as Big Nick Maronie
- Julie Gibson as Joan, model
- Shirley Hunter as Gloria
- Lola Jensen as Other model with Joan
- Margaret Zane as Girl with Gloria
- Stanley Ross as Mushnose

== Reception ==
The Los Angeles Times called the film "a trifle heavy handed".
