= City of Silent Men =

1942 film directed by William Nigh

- Theatrical release poster
- Directed by: William Nigh
- Screenplay by: Joseph Hoffman
- Story by: Robert E. Kent; Joseph Hoffman
- Produced by: Dixon R. Harwin
- Starring: Frank Albertson; June Lang; Jan Wiley; Richard Clarke; William Gould; Emmett Lynn
- Cinematography: Gilbert Warrenton
- Edited by: Carl Pierson
- Music by: Leo Erdody
- Production company: Producers Releasing Corporation
- Distributed by: Producers Releasing Corporation
- Release date: October 12, 1942
- Running time: 64 minutes
- Country: United States
- Language: English

City of Silent Men is a 1942 American crime film directed by William Nigh and written by Joseph Hoffman. The film stars Frank Albertson, June Lang, Jan Wiley, Richard Clarke, William Gould and Emmett Lynn. The film was released on October 12, 1942, by Producers Releasing Corporation.

== Cast ==
- Frank Albertson as Gil Davis
- June Lang as Helen Hendricks
- Jan Wiley as Jane Muller
- Richard Clarke as Jerry Hendricks
- William Gould as Mayor Hendricks
- Emmett Lynn as Jeb Parker
- Dick Curtis as Frank Muller
- Barton Hepburn as Frank
- Frank Jaquet as Judge
- Frank Ferguson as Fred Bernard
- Richard Bailey as Liptine
- Jack Baxley as Police Chief
- William Kellogg as Police Captain
- Charles Jordan as Gordon
- Pat Gleason as Manners
