= Below the Deadline (1946 film) =

1946 film

- Directed by: William Beaudine
- Written by: Forrest Judd; Harvey Gates; Ivan Tors
- Produced by: Lindsley Parsons
- Starring: Warren Douglas; Ramsay Ames; Jan Wiley
- Cinematography: Harry Neumann
- Edited by: Ace Herman
- Music by: Edward J. Kay
- Production company: Monogram Pictures
- Distributed by: Monogram Pictures
- Release date: August 3, 1946
- Running time: 65 minutes
- Country: United States
- Language: English

Below the Deadline is a 1946 American crime film directed by William Beaudine and starring Warren Douglas, Ramsay Ames and Jan Wiley.

== Plot ==
A returning World War II veteran gets involved in running his murdered brother's gambling operation. Along the way he falls for one of the girls working in his casino, and becomes involved in a power struggle with another mobster.

== Cast ==
- Warren Douglas as Joe Hilton
- Ramsay Ames as Lynn Turner
- Jan Wiley as Vivian Saunders
- Paul Maxey as Arthur Brennan
- Philip Van Zandt as Oney Kessel
- John Harmon as Pinky
- Bruce Edwards as Samuel P. Austin
- George Meeker as Jeffrey Hilton
- Clancy Cooper as Nichols
- Cay Forrester as Blonde
- Al Bridge as Turner
- George Eldredge as James S. Vail
- William Ruhl as Welsh
- Vera Pavlovska as Russian Singer
- Charles Sullivan as Charlie - Kessel Henchman
- Meyer Grace as Kessel Henchman
- George Lloyd as Kane - Club Owner

== Bibliography ==
- Spicer, Andrew. Historical Dictionary of Film Noir. Scarecrow Press, 2010.
