= Anne Gwynne =

American actress (1918–2003)

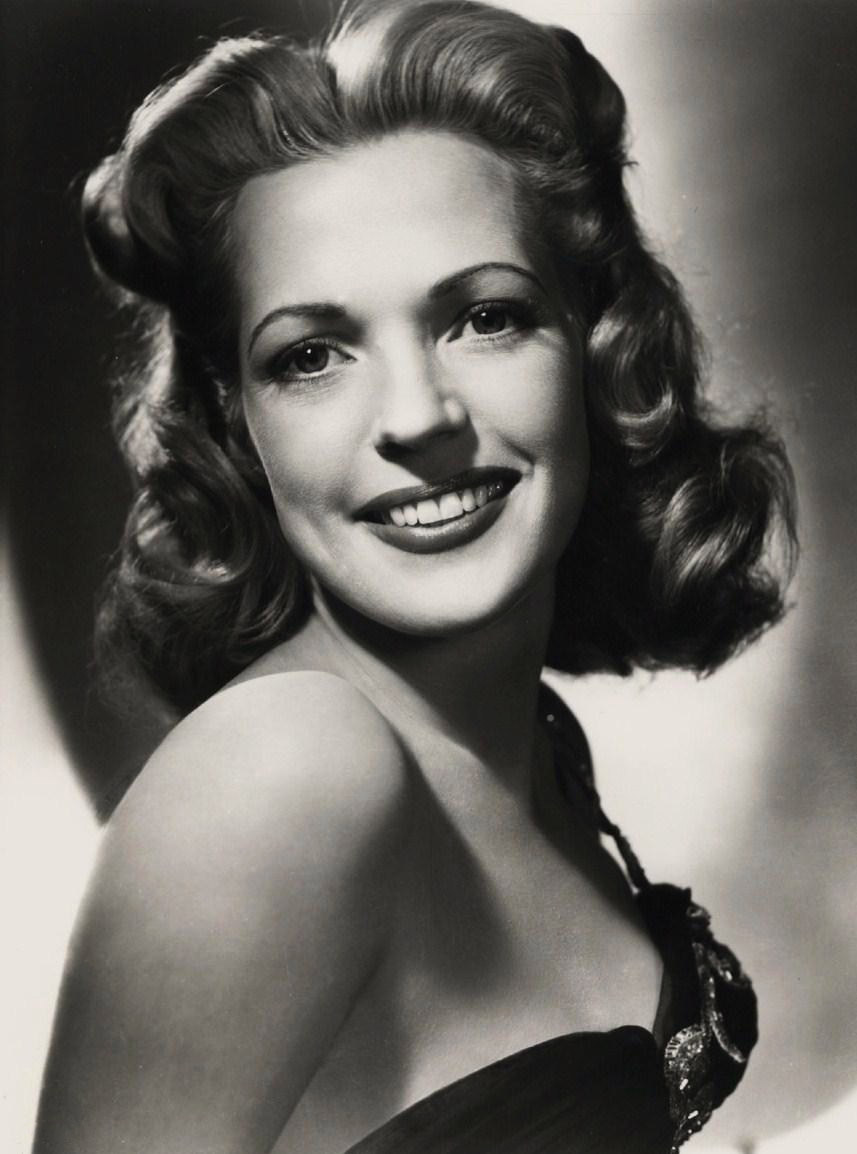
- Gwynne in the 1940s
- Born: Marguerite Gwynne Trice; December 10, 1918; Waco, Texas, U.S.
- Died: March 31, 2003 (aged 84); Woodland Hills, California, U.S.
- Occupation: Actress
- Years active: 1939–1970
- Spouse: Max M. Gilford (m. 1945; died 1965)
- Children: 2, including Gwynne
- Relatives: Robert Pine (son-in-law); Chris Pine (grandson)

Anne Gwynne (born Marguerite Gwynne Trice; December 10, 1918 – March 31, 2003) was an American actress who was known as one of the first scream queens because of her numerous appearances in horror films. Gwynne was also one of the most popular pin-ups of World War II. She was the maternal grandmother of actor Chris Pine.

== Early life ==
Gwynne was born on December 10, 1918, in Waco, Texas, the daughter of Pearl (née Guinn) and Jefferson Benjamin Trice, an apparel manufacturer. She had a brother Jefferson Jr. After her family moved to St. Louis, Missouri, she attended Stephens College, where she studied drama.

== Career ==
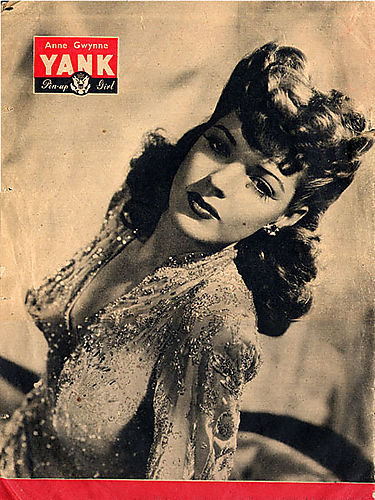
A 1944 pin-up of Gwynne

While accompanying her father to a convention in Los Angeles, Gwynne obtained a job modeling for Catalina Swimwear. She soon began acting in small theaters and appeared in a newsreel and a charity short. In June 1939, she signed a contract with Universal and was immediately put to work in Unexpected Father.

Universal cast her in a variety of genres, including film noir and musical comedy. She co-starred with Buster Crabbe and Carol Hughes in Flash Gordon Conquers the Universe, a 12-episode Universal serial (1940). Gwynne made a number of Westerns at the studio, including two she numbered among her favorite projects: Men of Texas with Robert Stack and Broderick Crawford and Ride 'Em Cowboy with Abbott and Costello (both 1942). She is remembered by fans of horror films for her work in several pictures made in the 1940s. Her first horror film was Black Friday (1940) in which she played Boris Karloff's daughter. House of Frankenstein (1944) was the last horror picture in which she appeared at Universal.

Gwynne was a television pioneer, appearing in TV's first filmed series, Public Prosecutor (1947–48); she was a member of the regular cast, playing Pat Kelly, the district attorney's secretary.

== Personal life ==
Gwynne married Max M. Gilford in 1945. The couple had two children: Gregory, a recording artist on Dunhill Records; and Gwynne, an actress. Gwynne Gilford and her husband, actor Robert Pine, have two children, actors Katherine and Chris Pine.

== Death ==
Gwynne died March 31, 2003, of a stroke following surgery at the Motion Picture Country Hospital in Woodland Hills, California. She was cremated, and her ashes were scattered at sea.

== Partial filmography ==
- Unexpected Father (1939) – Kitty – showgirl
- Oklahoma Frontier (1939) – Janet Rankin
- Little Accident (1939) – Blonde Girl (uncredited)
- Man from Montreal (1939) – Doris Blair
- The Big Guy (1939) – Joan's Friend (uncredited)
- Charlie McCarthy, Detective (1939) – Miss Larkin, Charlie's Nurse (uncredited)
- The Green Hornet (1940, Serial) – Josephine Weaver [Ch. 3] (uncredited)
- Honeymoon Deferred (1940) – Cecile Blades
- Framed (1940) – Girl (uncredited)
- Black Friday (1940) – Jean Sovac
- It's a Date (1940) – Society Girl (uncredited)
- Flash Gordon Conquers the Universe (1940, Serial) – Sonja [Chs. 2, 6-12]
- Sandy Is a Lady (1940) – Millie
- Bad Man from Red Butte (1940) – Tibby Mason
- Spring Parade (1940) – Jenny
- Give Us Wings (1940) – Julie Mason
- Nice Girl? (1941) – Sylvia Dana
- Washington Melodrama (1941) – Mary Morgan
- The Black Cat (1941) – Elaine Winslow
- Tight Shoes (1941) – Ruth
- Mob Town (1941) – Marion Barker
- Melody Lane (1941) – Patricia Reynolds
- Road Agent (1941) – Patricia Leavitt
- Keeping Fit (1942) – Nurse
- Don't Get Personal (1942) – Susan Blair
- Jail House Blues (1942) – Doris Daniels
- Ride 'Em Cowboy (1942) – Anne Shaw
- Broadway (1942) – Pearl
- The Strange Case of Doctor Rx (1942) – Kit Logan Church
- You're Telling Me (1942) – Kit Bellamy
- Men of Texas (1942) – Jane Baxter Scott
- Sin Town (1942) – Laura Kirby
- We've Never Been Licked (1943) – Nina Lambert
- Frontier Badmen (1943) – Chris Prentice
- Top Man (1943) – Pat Warren
- Ladies Courageous (1944) – Gerry Vail
- Weird Woman (1944) – Paula Reed
- Moon Over Las Vegas (1944) – Marion Corbett
- South of Dixie (1944) – Dixie Holister
- Babes on Swing Street (1944) – Frances Carlyle
- Murder in the Blue Room (1944) – Nan
- House of Frankenstein (1944) – Rita Hussman
- I Ring Doorbells (1946) – Brooke Peters
- Fear (1946) – Eileen Stevens / Cathy Stevens
- The Glass Alibi (1946) – Belle Martin
- The Ghost Goes Wild (1947) – Phyllis Beecher
- Killer Dill (1947) – Judy Parker
- Dick Tracy Meets Gruesome (1947) – Tess Trueheart
- Panhandle (1948) – June O'Carroll
- The Enchanted Valley (1948) – Midge Gray
- Arson, Inc. (1949) – Jane Jennings
- The Blazing Sun (1950) – Kitty
- Call of the Klondike (1950) – Nancy Craig
- King of the Bullwhip (1950) – Jane Kerrigan
- Breakdown (1952) – Candy Allen
- Teenage Monster (1958) – Ruth Cannon
- Adam at 6 A.M. (1970) – Mrs. Gaines (final film role)
