= Mr. Wong, Detective =

1938 film by William Nigh

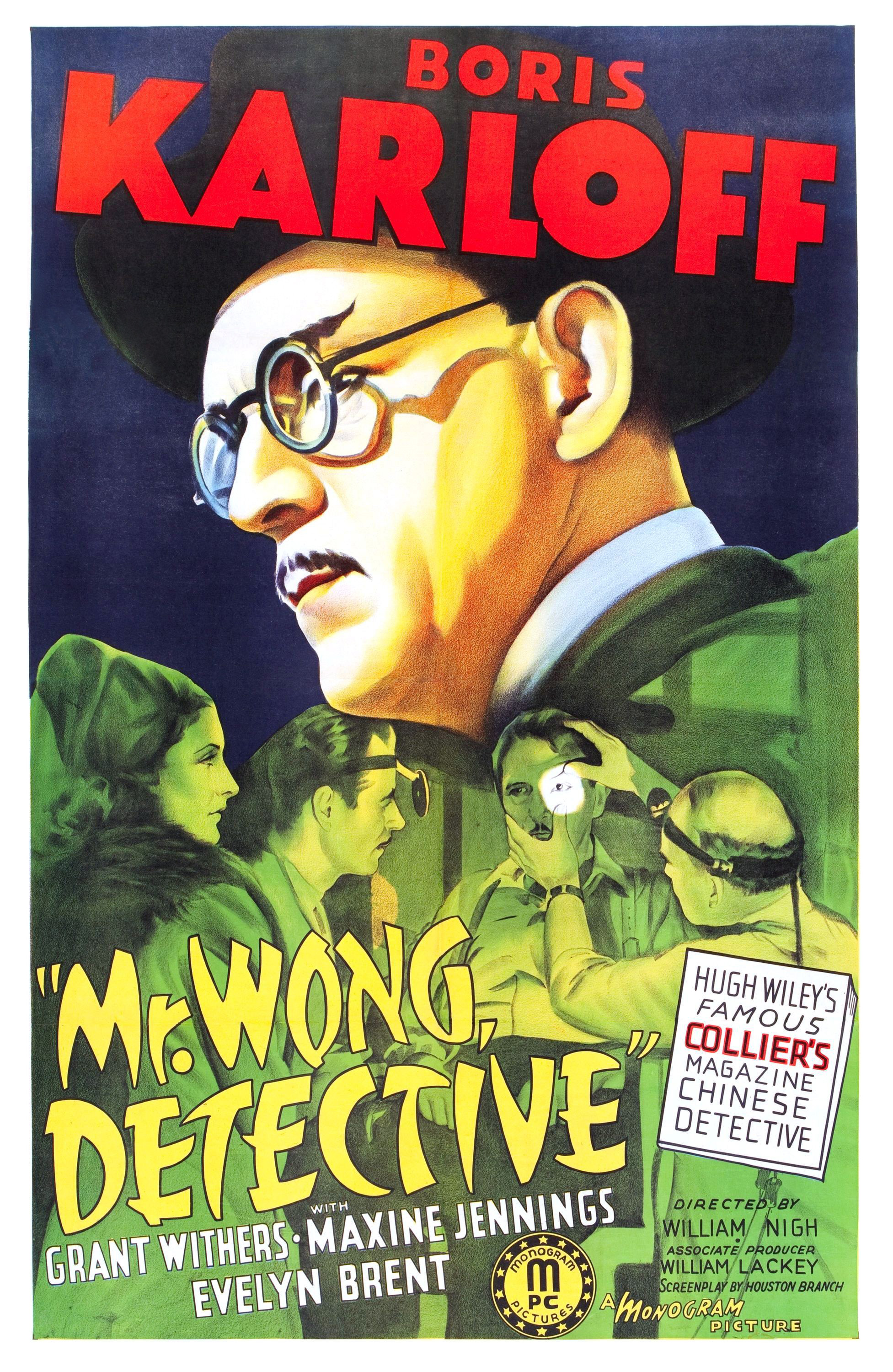
- Film poster
- Directed by: William Nigh
- Screenplay by: Houston Branch
- Based on: (James Lee Wong series in Collier's Magazine written by Hugh Wiley)
- Produced by: William T. Lackey
- Starring: Boris Karloff
- Cinematography: Harry Neumann
- Edited by: Russell F. Schoengarth
- Color process: Black and white
- Production company: Monogram Pictures
- Distributed by: Monogram Pictures
- Release date: October 5, 1938
- Running time: 69 minutes
- Country: United States
- Language: English

Mr. Wong, Detective is a 1938 American crime film directed by William Nigh and starring Boris Karloff in his first appearance as Mr. Wong.

== Plot ==
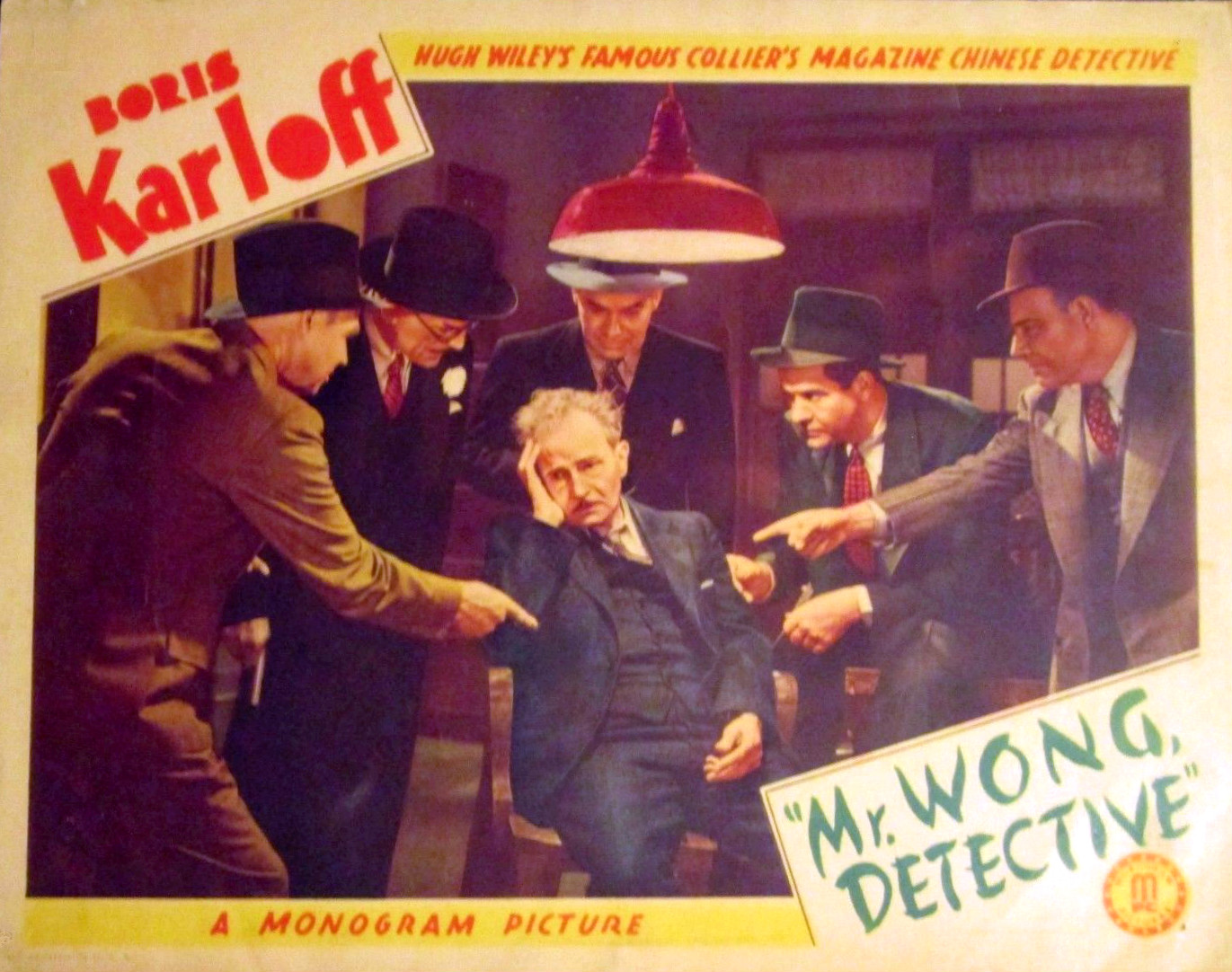
Lobby card for the film

Simon Dayton is in fear for his life and seeks the help of Mr. Wong to protect him. Just prior to meeting Mr. Wong, Dayton is found dead in his office in San Francisco without a mark on him. Several witnesses testify Dayton was alone in his office that was locked from the inside. Though the police view Dayton's death as due to a heart attack, Mr. Wong discovers a broken glass ball that contained poison gas.

Among the suspects are agents of a foreign power wishing to stop Dayton's chemicals being sent to use on the foreign power in the form of the same poison gas that killed Dayton, Dayton's business partners who will have Dayton's share of the business come to them after Dayton's death and the actual inventor of the chemical who has been cheated out of profits and recognition by Dayton.

== Cast ==
- Boris Karloff as Mr. James Lee Wong
- Grant Withers as Capt. Sam Street
- Maxine Jennings as Myra Ross
- Evelyn Brent as Olga - aka Countess Dubois
- George Lloyd as Devlin
- Lucien Prival as Anton Mohl
- John St. Polis as Carl Roemer
- William Gould as Theodore Meisle
- Hooper Atchley as Christian Wilk
- John Hamilton as Simon Dayton
- Wilbur Mack as Russell
- Lee Tung Foo as Tchin
- Lynton Brent as Tommy
- Grace Wood as Mrs. Roemer

== See also ==
- List of American films of 1938
- List of films in the public domain in the United States
