= Beware! (1919 film) =

1919 film by William Nigh

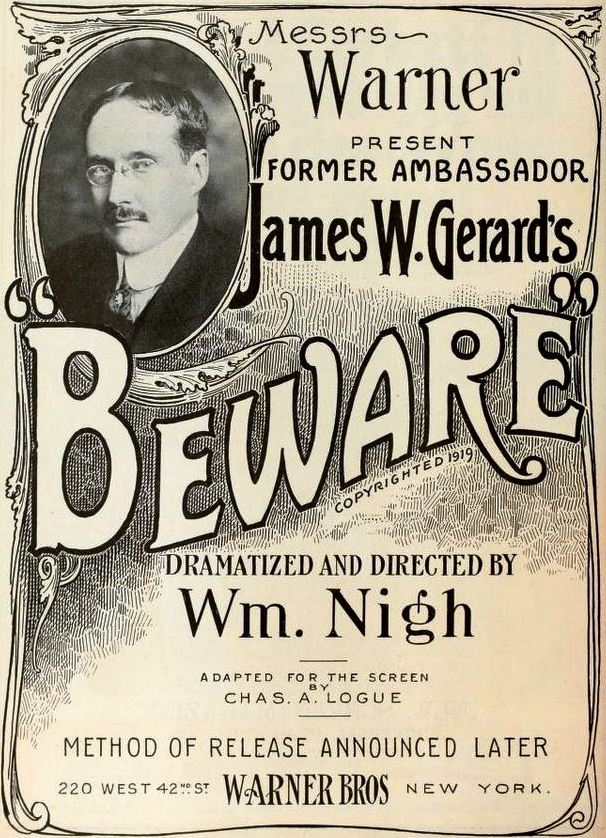
- Advertising for Beware! on page 738 of the Moving Picture World (May 10, 1919).
- Directed by: William Nigh
- Written by: James W. Gerard; Charles Logue
- Starring: Maurine Powers; Regina Quinn; Leslie Ryecroft; William Nigh
- Production company: Warner Bros.
- Distributed by: Warner Bros.
- Release date: June 1, 1919
- Running time: 9 reels
- Country: United States
- Language: Silent (English intertitles)

Beware! is a 1919 American silent war drama film directed by William Nigh, and starring Maurine Powers, Regina Quinn, Leslie Ryecroft, and William Nigh. The film was released by Warner Bros. on June 1, 1919.

== Plot ==
The American ambassador to Germany James W. Gerard warns that Germany will rise again to power and an attempt at world domination unless safeguards are taken.

== Cast ==
- Maurine Powers as Frederick the Great's Sweetheart
- Regina Quinn as French Girl — Red Cross Nurse
- Leslie Ryecroft as British Soldier
- William Nigh as German Officer
- Frank Norcross
- Julia Hurley
- Halbert Brown
- Herbert Standing

== Preservation ==
Prints of the film survive in the Library of Congress, Wisconsin Center for Film and Theater Research, and the UCLA Film & Television Archive.
