= I Ring Doorbells =

1946 film directed by Frank R. Strayer

- Directed by: Frank Strayer
- Screenplay by: Dick Irving Hyland
- Story by: Dick Irving Hyland; Raymond L. Schrock
- Based on: the book, I Ring Doorbells by Russell Birdwell
- Produced by: Martin Mooney
- Starring: Anne Gwynne; Robert Shayne; Roscoe Karns
- Cinematography: Benjamin H. Kline
- Edited by: George McGuire
- Music by: Leo Erdody
- Production company: Producers Releasing Corporation
- Distributed by: Producers Releasing Corporation
- Release date: February 25, 1946 (US)
- Running time: 67 minutes
- Country: United States
- Language: English

I Ring Doorbells is a 1946 American comedy-drama film directed by Frank Strayer, which stars Anne Gwynne, Robert Shayne, and Roscoe Karns. The story was adapted by Dick Irving Hyland and Raymond L. Schrock from the book of the same name by Russell Birdwell, and Hyland wrote the screenplay. The picture was produced and distributed by Producers Releasing Corporation, which released it on February 25, 1946.

== Cast ==
- Anne Gwynne as Brooke Peters
- Robert Shayne as Dick Meadows
- Roscoe Karns as Stubby
- Pierre Watkin as G. B. Barton
- Harry Shannon as Shannon
- John Eldredge as Ransome
- Harry Tyler as Tippy Miller
- Doria Caron as Yvette
- Jan Wiley as Helen Carter
- Joel McGinnis as Clyde Barton
- Charles Wilson as The Inspector
- Hank Patterson as Bradley
- Eugene Stutenroth as O'Halloran
- Roy Darmour as Willie
