= The Black Widow (serial) =

1947 serial film by Fred C. Brannon and Spencer Gordon Bennet

- Directed by: Spencer Gordon Bennet; Fred C. Brannon
- Written by: Franklin Adreon; Basil Dickey; Jesse Duffy; Sol Shor
- Produced by: M. J. Frankovich
- Starring: Bruce Edwards; Virginia Lindley; Carol Forman; Anthony Warde; Ramsay Ames; I. Stanford Jolley; Theodore Gottlieb
- Cinematography: John MacBurnie
- Distributed by: Republic Pictures
- Release dates: November 1, 1947 (U.S. serial); 1966 (U.S. TV film)
- Running time: 13 chapters / 180 minutes (serial); 6 26½-minute episodes (TV); 100 minutes (TV film)
- Language: English
- Budget: $168,995 (negative cost: $186,314)

The Black Widow (1947) is a thirteen-chapter Republic serial film.

== Plot ==
The Editor of the Daily Clarion newspaper hires writer and amateur criminologist Steve Colt to solve a series of murders, all involving venomous spider bites, with the aid of his best reporter Joyce Chambers.

Meanwhile, the evil King Hitomu has sent his daughter Sombra to the United States to fulfill his plan for global domination by stealing a prototype "Atomic Rocket Engine". Posing as a fortune teller, and assisted by her two loyal henchmen, Sombra sets about stealing the prototype and its secrets by utilizing her cunning nature, array of lethal gadgets, and ability to impersonate any woman she chooses with the aid of masks and wigs.

== Cast ==
- Bruce Edwards as Steve Colt, a mystery writer and amateur criminologist working for The Clarion, on the trail of a series of bizarre murders.
- Virginia Lindley as Joyce Winters, a reporter for The Clarion working with Colt, whom Sombra impersonates in order to get close to him.
- Carol Forman as Sombra, daughter and agent of King Hitomu. She is an expert at disguises, manipulation, and planning.
- Anthony Warde as Nick Ward, a small-time gangster hired by Sombra as her personal enforcer.
- Ramsay Ames as Ruth Dayton, a secretary employed by a top scientist on the prototype team. Sombra assumes her identity to steal crucial information on the design and function of the prototype, despite Colt's efforts to prevent her from doing so.
- I. Stanford Jolley as Dr. Z.V Jaffa, a scientist in service to King Hitomu. He assists Sombra by designing her gadgets and creating the masks she uses for flawless disguises.
- Theodore Gottlieb as King Hitomu, the aged and evil ruler of a small foreign kingdom, who dreams of acquiring the means by which he can achieve world domination.
- Forrest Taylor as Bradley, a mob lawyer and acquaintance of Ward's.
- Virginia Carroll as Ann Curry, the only female member of the prototype team. Sombra uses her identity to steal the device and later has her murdered.

== Production ==
The Black Widow was budgeted at $168,995 although the final negative cost was $186,314 (a $17,319, or 10.2%, overspend). It was the most expensive Republic serial of 1947.

It was filmed between 11 April and 8 May 1947. The serial's production number was 1697.

It was one of only four 13-chapter serials to be released by Republic. Three of the four were released in 1947, the only original serials released in that year. The fourth serial of the year was a re-release of the 15-chapter, 1941 serial Jungle Girl. This marked the first time Republic had re-released a serial to add to their first run serial releases.

=== Stunts ===
- Tom Steele as Steve Colt (doubling Bruce Edwards)
- Dale Van Sickel as Nick Ward (doubling Anthony Warde)
- Bud Wolfe as Nick Ward (doubling Anthony Warde)

=== Special Effects ===
Created by the Lydecker brothers.

== Release ==
=== Theatrical ===
The Black Widow's official release date is 1 November 1947, although this was the date the sixth chapter was made available to film exchanges.

=== Television ===
In the early 1950s, The Black Widow was one of fourteen Republic serials edited into a television series. It was broadcast in six 26½-minute episodes.

The Black Widow was one of twenty-six Republic serials re-released as a film on television in 1966. The title of the film was changed to Sombra, the Spider Woman. This version was cut down to 100-minutes in length.

== Chapter titles ==
1. Deadly Prophecy (20 min)
2. The Stolen Formula (13min 20s)
3. Hidden Death (13min 20s)
4. Peril in the Sky (13min 20s)
5. The Spider's Lair (13min 20s)
6. Glass Guillotine (13min 20s)
7. Wheels of Death (13min 20s)
8. False Information (13min 20s)
9. The Spider's Venom (13min 20s) - a re-cap chapter
10. The Stolen Corpse (13min 20s)
11. Death Dials a Number (13min 20s)
12. The Talking Mirror (13min 20s)
13. A Life for a Life (13min 20s)

_{Source:}

== See also ==
- List of film serials by year
- List of film serials by studio
