= Mob Town (1941 film) =

1941 film

- Directed by: William Nigh
- Written by: Walter Doniger; Brenda Weisberg
- Produced by: Ken Goldsmith
- Starring: Dick Foran; Anne Gwynne; Billy Halop; Huntz Hall
- Cinematography: Elwood Bredell
- Edited by: Arthur Hilton
- Music by: Hans J. Salter
- Production company: Universal Pictures
- Distributed by: Universal Pictures
- Release date: October 3, 1941
- Running time: 60 minutes
- Country: United States
- Language: English

Mob Town is a 1941 American comedy crime film directed by William Nigh and starring Dick Foran, Anne Gwynne, the Dead End Kids and the Little Tough Guys. It was produced and distributed by Universal Pictures.

== Plot ==
A man is convicted of murder and sentenced to death for the crime. His brother, who idolized him, meets a cop, Sgt. Frank Conroy, who attempts to stop the boy and his gang of friends from ending up the same way as his brother did. He enrolls them in a recreational program and helps them get jobs. However, things change when the kid finds out that Conroy was the cop who arrested his brother, which resulted in his execution.

== Cast ==
- Dick Foran as Sgt. Frank Conroy
- Anne Gwynne as Marion Barker
- Darryl Hickman as Butch Malone aka Shrimp
- Samuel S. Hinds as Judge Luther Bryson
- Victor Kilian as Uncle Lon Barker
- Truman Bradley as Officer Cuttler
- John Butler as Rummell
- John Sheehan as Mr. Loomis
- Emory Parnell as Captain Harrington - Police Chief

=== Dead End Kids and Little Tough Guys ===
- Billy Halop as Tom Barker
- Huntz Hall as Pig
- Gabriel Dell as String
- Bernard Punsly as Ape

== Bibliography ==
- Fetrow, Alan G. Feature Films, 1940-1949: a United States Filmography. McFarland, 1994.
