= Beauty and the Bandit =

1946 film directed by William Nigh

- Theatrical release poster
- Directed by: William Nigh
- Screenplay by: Charles S. Belden
- Produced by: Scott R. Dunlap
- Starring: Gilbert Roland; Martin Garralaga; Frank Yaconelli; Ramsay Ames; Vida Aldana; George J. Lewis
- Cinematography: Harry Neumann
- Edited by: Fred Maguire
- Production company: Monogram Pictures
- Distributed by: Monogram Pictures
- Release date: November 9, 1946
- Running time: 77 minutes
- Country: United States
- Language: English

Beauty and the Bandit is a 1946 American Western film directed by William Nigh and written by Charles S. Belden. The film stars Gilbert Roland, Martin Garralaga, Frank Yaconelli, Ramsay Ames, Vida Aldana and George J. Lewis. The film was released on November 9, 1946, by Monogram Pictures.

== Plot ==
Set in the late 1800s of California, The Cisco Kid returns to the screen. The bandito, disguised with his men as an escort, ambushes a stagecoach which carries a wealthy young Frenchman named Du Bois. Du Bois is delivering a chest of silver to San Marino, and the Cisco Kid claims it is money that was stolen over many years from the impoverished people of California, and he intends to return it. The Kid's gang escape with the money, but the Cisco Kid stays behind, only to learn that Du Bois is actually a beautiful young woman, Jeanne Du Bois. Du Bois agrees to accompany the Kid back to his hideout, and the two find themselves attracted to one another even though they are on opposite sides. The bandit eventually offers to return the money to Du Bois, and she must then decide how to distribute that money.

== Cast ==
- Gilbert Roland as The Cisco Kid
- Martin Garralaga as Dr. Juan Valegra
- Frank Yaconelli as Baby
- Ramsay Ames as Jeanne Du Bois
- Vida Aldana as Waitress Rosita
- George J. Lewis as Capitan
- William Gould as Doc Wells
- Dimas Sotello as Farmer
- Felipe Turich as Sick Farmer
- Glen Strange as Cisco's friend
