= Ramsay Ames =

American actress (1919–1998)

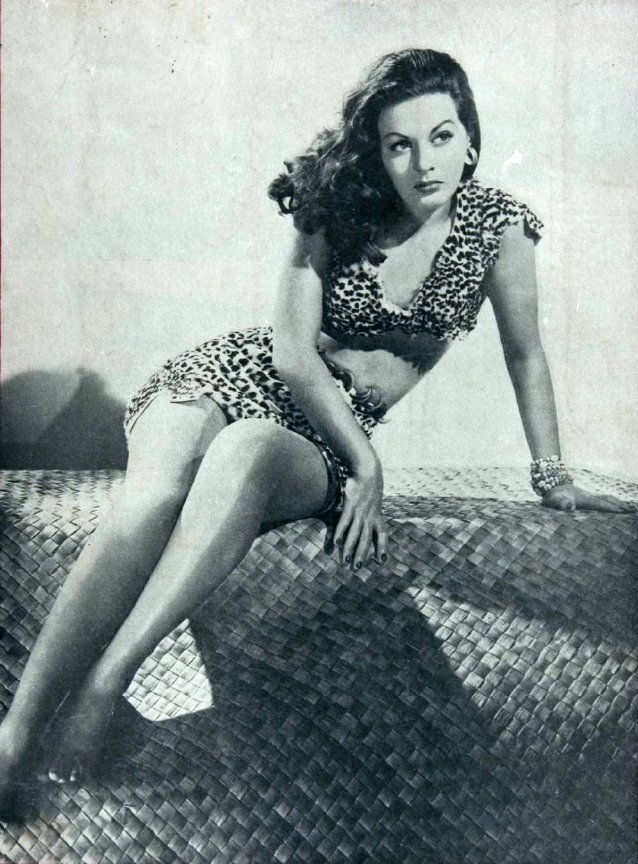
- Ames in 1945
- Born: Ramsay Phillips; March 30, 1919; Long Island, U.S.
- Died: March 30, 1998 (aged 79); Santa Monica, California, U.S.
- Occupations: Actress, model
- Years active: 1939–1963
- Spouse: Dale Wasserman (divorced)

Ramsay Ames (born Ramsay Phillips, March 30, 1919 – March 30, 1998) was a leading 1940s American B movie actress, model, dancer, pin-up girl and television hostess. As a dancer, she was billed as Ramsay D'el Rico. She is also credited as Ramsey Ames.

== Career ==
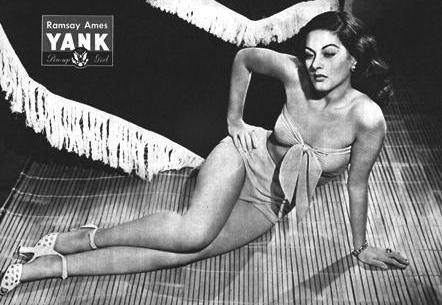
Pin-up photo of Ames for Yank, the Army Weekly in 1945

Of Spanish/English descent, Ames was born on Long Island. Athletic in high school, she excelled as a swimmer. Ames first was recognized as a dancer/singer before moving into sultry-eyed 1940s film roles.

Ames became part of a dance team under the name Ramsay D'el Rico and appeared as a model at the Eastman Kodak-sponsored fashion show at the 1939 New York World's Fair. An injury forced her to alter her dance career plans. She took up singing and became the vocalist with a top rhumba band.

During a trip to California to visit her mother, Ramsay had a chance meeting at the airport with Columbia Pictures President Harry Cohn. The meeting resulted in a screen test and then her movie debut in Two Señoritas from Chicago (1943).

From there, she moved to Universal Pictures, where she was featured in such films as Calling Dr. Death and Ali Baba and the Forty Thieves. In 1944, she appeared in the film The Mummy's Ghost, where she played a young woman possessed by the soul of an Egyptian princess. She later appeared in a Monogram Pictures drama, Below the Deadline (1946), and in Republic serials including The Black Widow (1947) and G-Men Never Forget (1948).

After her career subsided in the 1940s, Ames and her husband lived in Spain, where she had her own television interview show and occasionally took on support roles in films produced in Europe.

According to director William Witney, some of Republic Pictures' stuntmen suffered more injuries running on rooftops to get a better look at Ramsay Ames walking across the backlot than were hurt performing dangerous action sequences in the studio's westerns.

== Personal life ==
Ames was wed to Man of La Mancha playwright Dale Wasserman, a Tony Award-winning musical writer and the couple later lived in a villa called "La Mancha" on the Costa del Sol. She later divorced him.

== Selected filmography ==
- Two Señoritas from Chicago (1943) as Louise Hotchkiss
- Crazy House (1943) as Herself (as Ramsay Ames and Her Tropicanans)
- Calling Dr. Death (1943) as Maria Steele
- Ali Baba and the Forty Thieves (1944) as Nalu
- Ladies Courageous (1944) (uncredited)
- Hat Check Honey (1944) as Mona Mallory
- Follow the Boys (1944) as Laura
- Ghost Catchers (1944) as Minor Role (uncredited)
- The Mummy's Ghost (1944) as Amina Mansouri
- A Wave, a WAC and a Marine (1944) as Betty
- Mildred Pierce (1945) as Party Guest (uncredited)
- Too Young to Know (1945) as Party Guest #1
- The Gay Cavalier (1946) as Pepita Geralda
- Below the Deadline (1946) as Lynn Turner
- Beauty and the Bandit (1946) as Jeanne Du Bois
- The Time, the Place and the Girl (1946) as Bar Patron (uncredited)
- Philo Vance Returns (1947) as Virginia Berneaux
- The Vigilante: Fighting Hero of the West (1947) as Betty Winslow
- Green Dolphin Street (1947) as Corinne (uncredited)
- The Black Widow (1947) as Ruth Dayton
- G-Men Never Forget (1948, Serial) as Frances Blake
- Vicki (1953) as Café Photographer (uncredited)
- The Lie (1954, TV Movie) as Marlene
- Alexander the Great (1956) as Drunken Woman (as Ramsey Ames)
- At Five O'Clock in the Afternoon (1961) as Americana (uncredited)
- The Running Man (1963) as Madge Penderby
- Una tal Dulcinea (1963) (final film role)

Soundtrack (5 credits)

- Two Señoritas from Chicago (1943) (performer: "Coca Chica")
- Crazy House (1943) (performer: "Tropicana" - uncredited)
- Hat Check Honey (1944) (performer: "Nice To Know You")
- The Gay Cavalier (performer: "One Kiss and Ride", "The Gay Caballero") (1946) (writer: "One Kiss and Ride", "The Gay Caballero")
- Philo Vance Returns (1947) (performer: "Tell Me")

Archive footage (5 credits)

- The Mummy's Ghost (1966) (as Amina)
- Sombra, the Spider Woman (1966) (as Ruth Dayton)
- Code 645 (1966) (as Frances Blake)
- Mummy Dearest: A Horror Tradition Unearthed (1999) (for her role as Amina Mansouri in The Mummy's Ghost)
- Svengoolie (2012)

Pictorials

- Yank (USA) 24 December 1943
- Yank (USA) 20 April 1945
- Yank (USA) 4 May 1945

== See also ==
- Pin-ups of Yank, the Army Weekly
