= A Fig Leaf for Eve =

1944 film by Don Brodie

- US Film Poster
- Directed by: Don Brodie
- Written by: Harry O. Hoyt (story); Elizabeth Hayter (screenplay)
- Produced by: Raymond Friedgen (associate producer); J. Richard Westen (producer)
- Starring: Jan Wiley
- Cinematography: Marcel Le Picard
- Edited by: Richard C. Currier
- Music by: Frank Sanucci
- Distributed by: Monogram Pictures
- Release date: 4 July 1944
- Running time: 69 minutes
- Country: United States
- Language: English

A Fig Leaf for Eve is a 1944 American film directed by Don Brodie.

The film is also known as Desirable Lady, Flaming Girls, Hollywood Nights, Not Enough Clothes, Reckless Youth, Room for Love, and Strips and Blondes as American reissue titles.

== Plot ==
Young Eve Lorraine (Jan Wiley) is an exotic dancer at the Club Cézanne in New York who is arrested for indecency while performing Salome's dance one night, when her manager Dan "Mac" McGrath (Phil Warren) is trying to make a greater impression and get her some publicity. In court Eve meets a bail-bondsman, Gus Hoffman (Eddie Dunn), who bails her out of jail. They talk to about Eve's background, where she mentions that her parents died when a theater collapsed somewhere twenty-three years ago, which makes Gus suspect that she is the rightful heir of the J.P. Sardam hair tonic empire and estate. There is a $1,000 reward for the one who finds the missing daughter of the Sardam spouses, who died during a Colorado theater collapse, which matches Eve's age and story.

Hoffman talks to the lawyer handling the inheritance and reward, Thomas W. Campbell (Emmett Vogan), and he assures him that he indeed has found the missing child. The lawyer tells Hoffman that Eve will inherit millions of dollars. Hoffman brings the great news back to Eve, but her agent Mac warns her to trust Hoffman.

Eve is overjoyed by the news, and goes off to the Sardam estate to meet her relatives. She is presented to uncle Horace (Edward Keane), his wife Lavinia (Betty Blythe) and their daughter Millicent (Marilyn McConnell). When they hear that she has been an exotic dancer and even been arrested especially Aunt Lavinia treat her like something the cat dragged in. But before the upset Eve can leave the mansion, she happens upon her great-aunt visiting from Wyoming, Sarah Birch (Janet Scott), who turns her mind around. Sarah finds the colorful Eve interesting enough to accept an invitation to the Club Cézanne in New York.

Eve gets a substantial advance on her inheritance and moves into an apartment that her uncle has rented for her. She persuades Sarah to come and live with her, and starts adapting to her new way of life, spending money on clothes and lessons in French. With the inheritance case still pending in court, Hoffman starts worrying about getting his share of the money and talks to her agent Mac about an immediate payment.

Eve is asked by the Sardam's to perform at an upcoming upscale charity fundraiser, and she rehearses a pretentious Shakespeare piece to blow her audience away. Her efforts result in the audience laughing at her performance and she leaves the stage ashamed and humiliated. After the show she is offered $10,000 as compensation if she retracts her claim in the court, and is even more upset. She goes up on the stage again and performs one of her usual exotic dances, and now the audience is spellbound and impressed.

Once Eve comes back to her apartment, Hoffman is there with Mac, demanding his share of the inheritance money. They struggle and Hoffman holds Mac at gunpoint. When Mac tries to take the gun, a shot fires and Hoffman is killed. Mac quickly flees the scene, leaving Eve alone in the apartment with the body.

Eve is arrested for murdering Hoffman, but Mac eventually turns himself in and confesses to the killing. Campbell comes to the rescue, informing the police about Hoffman's previous conviction for forgery. Mac is released from jail for acting in self-defence and it turns out that Hoffman had forged the papers that say Eve is the heir of the Sardam estate.

Still, both Sarah and Horace are convinced that Eve is the rightful heir, despite Hoffman's antics, and accept her claim. However, Eve decides to withdraw the claim entirely and move with Sarah to Wyoming. She changes her mind when Mac tells her that he has been in love with her the whole time and asks her to marry him.

== Cast ==
- Jan Wiley as Eve Lorraine / Eve Westland
- Phil Warren as Dan "Mac" McGrath
- Eddie Dunn as Gus Hoffman - Bail-Bondsman
- Janet Scott as Aunt Sarah Birch
- Emmett Vogan as Thomas W. Campbell - Attorney
- Edward Keane as Horace Sardham
- Betty Blythe as Lavinia Sardham
- Marilyn McConnell as Millicent 'Millie' Sardham
- Dick Rush as Police Desk Sgt. Tomlin
- Cheerio Meredith as Tillie - Old Drunk
- Herbert Evans as Sardams's Butler
- Chester Conklin as Waiter
- Jack Cheatham as Arresting Policeman
- Selika Pettiford as Selinka Pettiford - Organ Player
- Eleanor Freeman as Piano Solo

== See also ==
- List of American films of 1944
