= Streets of New York (1939 film) =

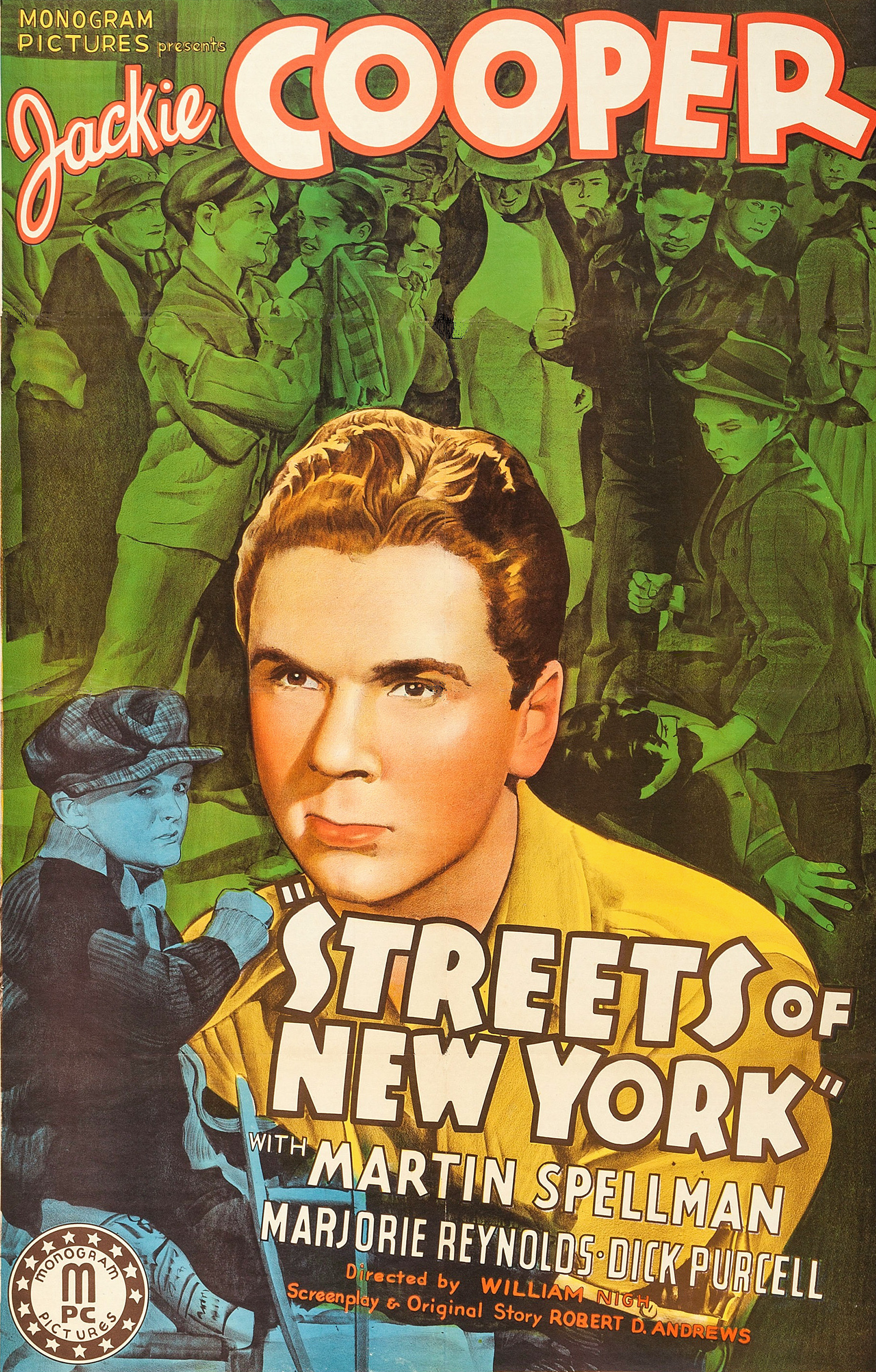
- Film poster
- Directed by: William Nigh
- Written by: Robert Hardy Andrews
- Produced by: Scott R. Dunlap (producer); William T. Lackey (associate producer)
- Cinematography: Harry Neumann
- Edited by: Russell F. Schoengarth
- Music by: Edward J. Kay
- Production company: Monogram Pictures
- Release date: 12 April 1939
- Running time: 73 minutes
- Country: United States
- Language: English

Streets of New York is a 1939 American film directed by William Nigh.

The film is also known as The Abe Lincoln of Ninth Avenue and The Abraham Lincoln of the 4th Avenue.

== Plot ==
George Irving, Jackie Cooper and Marjorie Reynolds in Streets of New York

Teenager Jimmy Keenan operates a newsstand and is studying to become a lawyer. He takes care of a crippled boy named Gimpy whose mother has died. Jimmy's brother Tap Keenan is a notorious criminal. A neighborhood gang led by Spike is trying to lead Jimmy into trouble.

Gimpy and Spike's gang are arrested for gambling. Jimmy convinces Judge Carroll that Gimpy had not actually gambled, as there was no evidence of money involved. The judge is impressed with Jimmy and releases the kids. Judge Carroll later learns that Jimmy is Tap's brother and urges Jimmy to continue to pursue his dream, hoping that he will not follow in his brother's path. Tap offers to finance Jimmy's education and wants Jimmy to work for him after graduating. Jimmy declines and warns Tap not to contact him.

After a Christmas gathering at Judge Carroll's home, Jimmy learns that Tap has killed a man and is hiding from the police. When Spike taunts Jimmy and mocks his mother, they fight. Jimmy returns to his room but finds Tap hiding there. Tap tries to convince Jimmy to help him to escape, but Jimmy insists that Tap surrender. As Gimpy enters, Tap shoots through the door and injures him. Jimmy wrestles with Tap and police arrest Tap several minutes later. After a few days, Jimmy is told that Gimpy will return later. Jimmy abandons the newspaper stand and continues to pursue his dream to become a lawyer like his hero Abraham Lincoln.

== Cast ==
- Jackie Cooper as James Michael "Jimmy" Keenan
- Martin Spellman as William McKinley "Gimpy" Smith
- Marjorie Reynolds as Anne Carroll
- Dick Purcell as T.P. 'Tap' Keenan
- George Cleveland as Pop O'Toole
- George Irving as Judge Carroll
- Robert Emmett O'Connor as Police Officer Burke
- Sidney Miller as Jiggsy, newsboy
- David Durand as Spike Morgan
- Buddy Pepper as Flatfoot, newsboy
