= Son of the Navy =

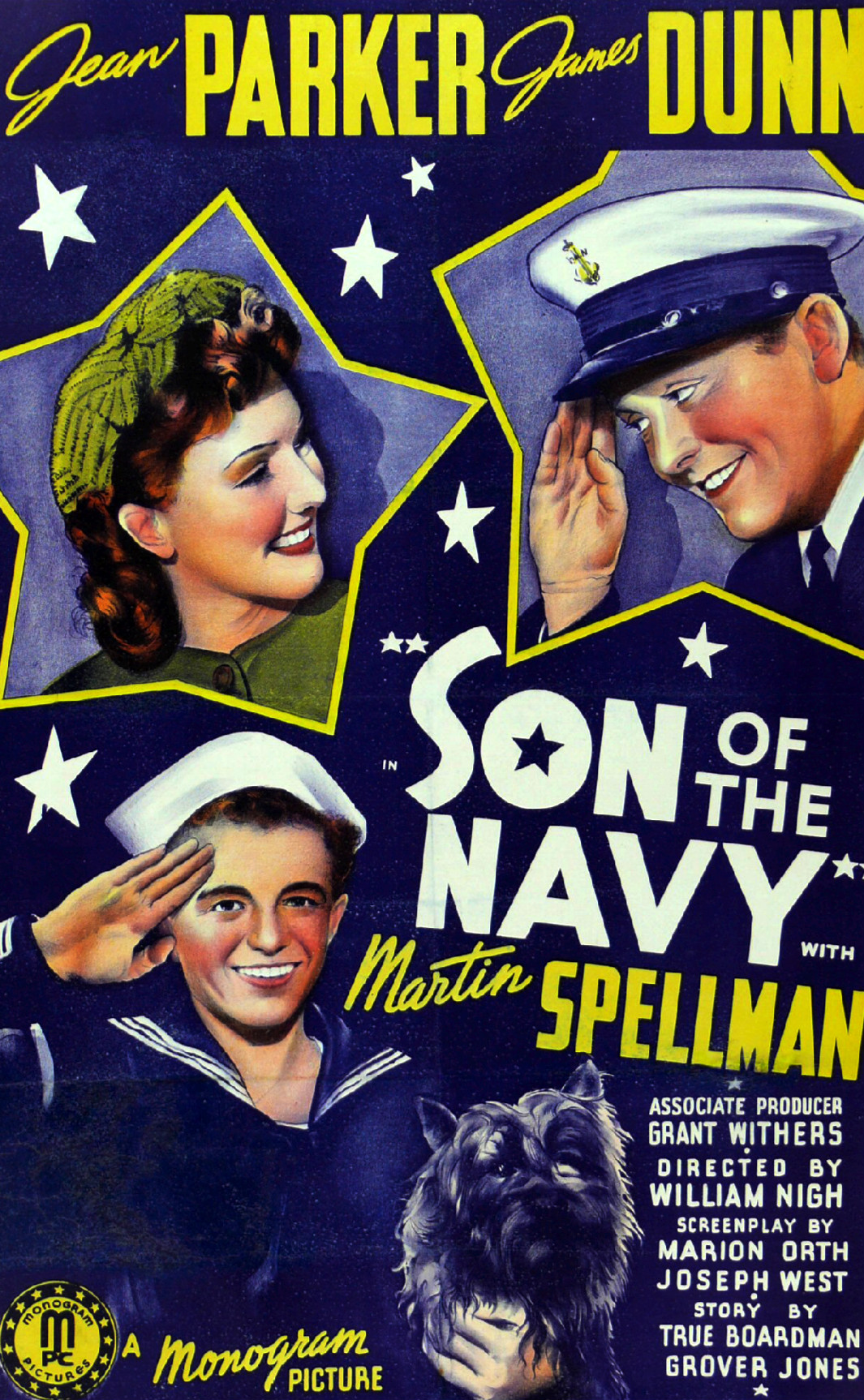
- Film poster
- Directed by: William Nigh
- Written by: True Boardman (story); Grover Jones (story); Marion Orth (screenplay); George Waggner (screenplay)
- Produced by: Scott R. Dunlap (producer); Grant Withers (associate producer)
- Starring: Jean Parker; James Dunn; Martin Spellman
- Cinematography: Harry Neumann
- Edited by: Russell F. Schoengarth
- Music by: Edward J. Kay
- Production company: Monogram Pictures
- Release date: March 30, 1940
- Running time: 72 minutes
- Country: United States
- Language: English

Son of the Navy, also known as The Young Recruit in the United States, is a 1940 American comedy-drama film directed by William Nigh and starring Jean Parker, James Dunn, and Martin Spellman.

== Plot ==
Racing to his battleship the USS Florida, Chief Gunners Mate Mike Malone attempts to hitchhike to Naval Base San Diego and runs into Tommy and his Cairn Terrier Terry who are runaways from an orphanage.

The scheming Tommy gets the two a lift to the base. At the base and frightened of being discovered he's a runaway, Tommy meets Steve Moore, the daughter of a Chief Petty Officer and gives her the impression that Mike is his father, especially after Steve saw Tommy see Mike off. Steve spreads the word that Mike is a runaway father abandoning his child getting him in trouble with his ship's captain and fellow chief petty officers.

Boy and his dog hitchhike unsuccessfully after running away from an orphanage to find a mom and a dad. A sailor, a chief gunner’s mate, who is trying to get to San Pedro, CA to meet his ship before it leaves port, catches up with the boy. Unable to hitchhike while in uniform, the boy gets an idea to jump in the sailors arms to seek pity on a passing driver. A single woman on her way to the port to meet her father, a navy commander, stops and picks them up, boy calls the man pops in order to continue the ruse. The sailor makes it to the ship in time, the woman visits her commander father. The boy, listening to the radio in the woman’s car while waiting for her to come back, hears his name and description as a run away orphan in Los Angeles, California. Boy panics, woman comes back to the car and doesn’t see boy. Woman decides boy must have gone home, woman heads to San Francisco to meet her dad at the next port.

While driving, woman hears knocking and thinks it is her car engine, she stops at a service station and asks the attendant to fill it up and check the motor and fix it while she gets a cup of coffee at the diner. The attendant looks at the motor and hears the knocking coming from the rumble seat in the rear of the car and finds the boy and his dog. Attendant brings boy to the woman, she buys the boy lunch who in turn shares it with his dog. Woman assumes the sailor abandoned his son and hi-jinx ensue.

In the end the truth comes out, the sailor contacts the orphanage but finds he is not eligible to adopt because he is single and on active duty, the woman is also told she is not eligible to adopt the boy because she is single. The woman hangs up the phone, man and woman look at each other mischievously. The woman, who throughout the entire movie swore she would never marry a sailor and was engaged to a business man earlier in the movie, marries the sailor, they adopt the boy and his dog. Mom, boy, and dog, see dad off at the port as he sails to Florida with his shipmates.

== Cast ==
- Jean Parker (actress) as Stevie Moore
- James Dunn as Chief Gunners Mate Mike Malone
- Martin Spellman as Tommy
- Terry as Terry
- Selmer Jackson as Capt. Parker
- William Royle as Chief Moore
- Sarah Padden as Mrs. Baker, Landlady
- Craig Reynolds as Brad Wheeler
- Dave O'Brien as Chief Machinist's Mate
- Gene Morgan as Burns
- Charles King as Duke Johnson

== Soundtrack ==
- "Anchors Aweigh", by Charles A. Zimmermann
