= William Nigh =

American film director, writer, and actor (1881–1955)

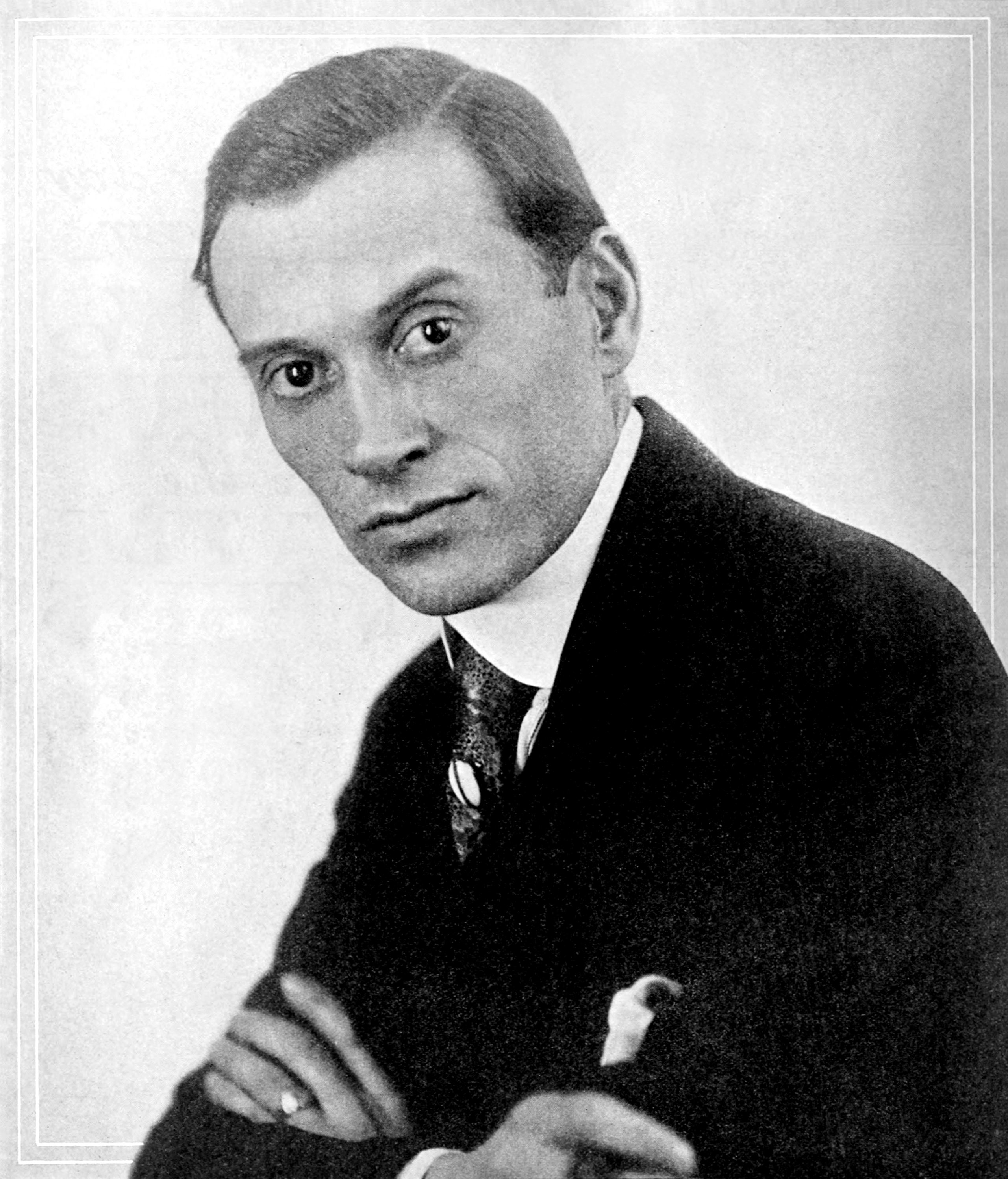
- Nigh in 1916
- Born: Emil Kreuske; October 12, 1881; Berlin, Wisconsin, U.S.
- Died: November 27, 1955 (aged 74); Burbank, California, U.S.
- Other names: Will Nigh; William Nye
- Occupations: Director, screenwriter, actor
- Years active: 1913–1948

William Nigh, born Emil Kreuske (October 12, 1881 – November 27, 1955), was an American film director, writer, and actor. His film work sometimes lists him as either "Will Nigh" or "William Nye".

== Biography ==
Nigh was born Emil Kreuske in Berlin, Wisconsin. He began his film career as an actor, appearing in 17 films in 1913 and 1914; he also directed one of these, Salomy Jane. He acted in eight more films in the 1910s and two more in the 1920s, but he is known mainly as a prolific director, with a total output of 119 films, the last in 1948. Most of his directorial output was in the "B"-movie category, and he worked mainly for lower-rung studios such as Monogram Pictures (where he directed several "Mr. Wong" and "East Side Kids" films) and Producers Releasing Corporation, although he did occasionally work for such "majors" as RKO Pictures and such "mini-majors" and "minors" as Universal and Republic Pictures. His film-writing credits numbered 18, mostly concentrated early in his career.

His films included Mr. Wise Guy, Thunder, Black Dragons, Corregidor, Mr. Wong, Detective, The Mystery of Mr. Wong, Mr. Wong in Chinatown, Lady from Chungking, The Fatal Hour, The Ape, Doomed to Die, Lord Byron of Broadway, and Casey of the Coast Guard.

Nigh died in Burbank, California at the age of 74.

== Partial filmography ==
=== Director ===
- Salomy Jane (1914)
- Mignon (1915)
- A Royal Family (1915)
- Emmy of Stork's Nest (1915)
- A Yellow Streak (1915)
- Her Debt of Honor (1916)
- The Kiss of Hate (1916)
- The Child of Destiny (1916)
- Notorious Gallagher (1916)
- Life's Shadows (1916)
- The Blue Streak (1917)
- The Slave (1917)
- Wife Number Two (1917)
- Thou Shalt Not Steal (1917)
- My Four Years in Germany (1918)
- The Fighting Roosevelts (1919)
- Beware! (1919)
- School Days (1921)
- Skinning Skinners (1921)
- Why Girls Leave Home (1921)
- Notoriety (1922)
- Your Best Friend (1922)
- Marriage Morals (1923)
- Born Rich (1924)
- Fear-Bound (1925)
- Casey of the Coast Guard (1926)
- The Fire Brigade (1926)
- The Little Giant (1926)
- The Nest (1927)
- Mr. Wu (1927)
- Across to Singapore (1928)
- Four Walls (1928)
- The Law of the Range (1928)
- Desert Nights (1929)
- Lord Byron of Broadway (1930)
- Today (1930)
- Fighting Thru (1930)
- The Single Sin (1931)
- The Lightning Flyer (1931)
- Border Devils (1932)
- Men Are Such Fools (1932)
- He Couldn't Take It (1933)
- City Limits (1934)
- Mystery Liner (1934)
- Two Heads on a Pillow (1934)
- Once to Every Bachelor (1934)
- School for Girls (1935)
- The Headline Woman (1935)
- Without Children (1935)
- She Gets Her Man (1935)
- Bill Cracks Down (1937)
- The 13th Man (1937)
- Boy of the Streets (1937)
- A Bride for Henry (1937)
- Rose of the Rio Grande (1938)
- Female Fugitive (1938)
- Romance of the Limberlost (1938)
- Mr. Wong, Detective (1938)
- Gangster's Boy (1938)
- I Am a Criminal (1938)
- The Mystery of Mr. Wong (1939)
- Streets of New York (1939)
- Mr. Wong in Chinatown (1939)
- Mutiny in the Big House (1939)
- The Fatal Hour (1940)
- Doomed to Die (1940)
- The Ape (1940)
- Son of the Navy (1940)
- No Greater Sin (1941)
- The Kid from Kansas (1941)
- Secret Evidence (1941)
- Zis Boom Bah (1941)
- Mob Town (1941)
- Mr. Wise Guy (1942)
- Black Dragons (1942)
- Escape from Hong Kong (1942)
- Tough As They Come (1942)
- City of Silent Men (1942)
- Lady from Chungking (1942)
- The Strange Case of Doctor Rx (1942)
- Corregidor (1943)
- The Underdog (1943)
- Where Are Your Children? (1943)
- Trocadero (1944)
- Are These Our Parents? (1944)
- Divorce (1945)
- Allotment Wives (1945)
- Forever Yours (1945)
- Beauty and the Bandit (1946)
- South of Monterey (1946)
- The Gay Cavalier (1946)
- Riding the California Trail (1947)
- I Wouldn't Be in Your Shoes (1948)
- Stage Struck (1948) – final film

=== Actor ===
- Mary Magdalene (1914)
- Salomy Jane (1914) - Rufe Waters
- A Royal Family (1915) - Minister of Police
- Her Debt of Honor (1916) - Olin Varcoe
- Notorious Gallagher; or, His Great Triumph (1916) - Buttsy Gallagher
- Life's Shadows (1916) - Martin Bradley
- The Blue Streak (1917) - The Blue Streak
- My Four Years in Germany (1918) - Socialist
- The Rainbow Trail (1918) - Shad
- Beware! (1919) - German Officer
- Democracy: The Vision Restored (1920) - David Fortune
- Among the Missing (1923) - The Deserter
- Fear-Bound (1925) - Jim Tumble (final film role)
