= The Blazing Sun (1950 film) =

1950 film by John English

- Poster for the film
- Directed by: John English
- Written by: Jack Townley
- Produced by: Armand Schaefer
- Starring: Gene Autry; Lynne Roberts; Anne Gwynne
- Cinematography: William Bradford
- Edited by: James Sweeney
- Production company: Gene Autry Productions
- Distributed by: Columbia Pictures
- Release date: November 20, 1950 (US)
- Running time: 69 minutes
- Country: United States
- Language: English

The Blazing Sun is a 1950 American Western film directed by John English and starring Gene Autry, Lynne Roberts, and Anne Gwynne.

== Plot ==
Gene Autry is a private investigator for a banking association, on the trail of two bank robbers, Al Bartlett and Trot Lucas. Bartlett and Lucas waylay Larry Taylor, a doctor on his way to the town of White Water to treat a train engineer who was wounded by the bank robbers, and Taylor's assistant, Helen Ellis. Stealing the couple's horses, they leave them stranded.

Autry rides out from White Water heading towards Los Robles, where the doctor was summoned from, to see what is keeping him. Coming upon the couple, he lets Larry ride Champion, Autry's horse, into White Water to get help, while he stays with Helen for protection. Larry returns shortly and the three ride into White Water.

In Los Robles, Helen's father, a prospector, enlists the help of a local assayer, Ben Luber, to evaluate the quality of some ore he has extracted. Ben tells Tom Ellis that he will need mining equipment to mine the ore, and his willing to lend him the money for it, in exchange for an interest in the mine. Ben and his brother, Carl, are partners with Bartlett and Lucas. When they go up to the hideout of the two bank robbers, they see Autry approaching, trying to track down the two bandits. Ben releases the two horses which were stolen from Doc Taylor and Helen, which Autry takes off after. Ben and Carl follow, and overpower Autry, who they accuse of stealing the horses, and take him into Los Robles. Autry is quickly cleared, and enlists the help of an old friend, Mike, to continue the search outside of town for Bartlett and Lucas. While camping out that night, they see Ben driving back into town late at night.

The following day, Autry publicly confronts Ben about his trip the previous night. Flustered, Ben makes up a story about two of his horses being stolen (which he has actually taken up to Lucas and Bartlett). When Sheriff Phillips raises a posse to go after the non-existent thieves, Ben sends them in the wrong direction. When Autry refuses to join the posse, Phillips has him put in jail for safe-keeping, until the posse returns. However, Bartlett robs the town's bank since the sheriff is away, and Helen witnesses it and follows him to his hideout in the hills.

Autry is released from jail, so he can track the bank robber. He arrives at Bartlett's cabin in the hills just as Helen is discovered. In the ensuing gunfight Bartlett kills his brother and Lucas, thinking that his dead brother's body will pass for him. When Kitty shows up to identify Bartlett's body, claiming to be his wife, Autry figures out that the dead man is not Bartlett.

Ben, knowing where Bartlett is now hiding out, offers to turn him in for the reward, but Bartlett figures out the doublecross and kills Ben. Autry and Tom Ellis ride after Bartlett, catching up to him as he boards a train in an attempt to escape. Bartlett is killed, and Autry allows Helen and Tom to have the reward money.

== Cast ==
- Gene Autry as Gene Autry
- Champion
- Lynne Roberts as Helen Ellis
- Anne Gwynne as Kitty
- Edward Norris as Doc Larry Taylor
- Kenne Duncan as Al Bartlett
- Alan Hale Jr. as Ben Luber
- Gregg Barton as Trot Lucas
- Steve Darrell as Sheriff Phillips
- Tom London as Tom Ellis
- Pat Buttram as Mike
- Sandy Sanders as Carl Luber

== Production ==
On January 15, 1950, Gene Autry announced that he would begin filming the first of his scheduled six films for Columbia with The Blazing Sun, commencing production on March 27. John Englund was named as director in April. Despite the earlier announcement, the filming did not begin until the end of April. After it opened, the National Legion of Decency assigned the film an "A" rating: "morally unobjectionable for general patronage".

== Reception ==
Motion Picture Daily (MPD) gave the film a somewhat favorable review, praising Autry's performance and that of his supporting cast. The review lamented that the film lacked action, although it was very realistic.

Variety enjoyed the film slightly more, writing that it compared favorably with more conventional Westerns and with more action than in Autry's other films. The review praised the cast, English's direction and the camerawork of William Bradford.
