= Fear-Bound =

1925 film

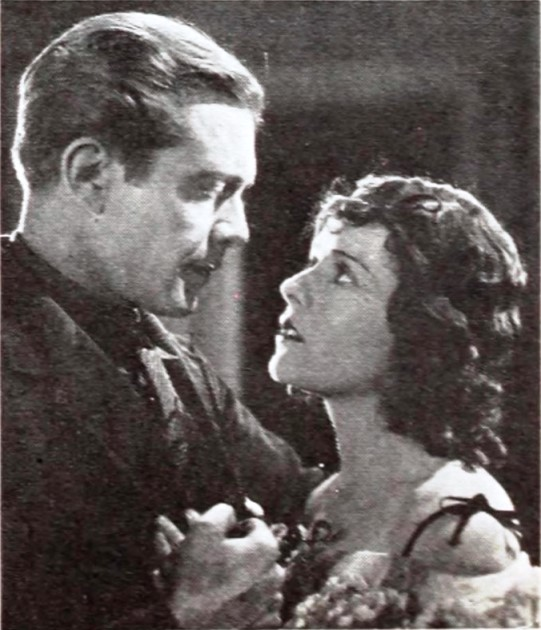
- Still with Welch and Daw
- Directed by: William Nigh
- Written by: William Nigh
- Starring: Marjorie Daw; William Nigh; Niles Welch
- Cinematography: Edward Paul
- Production company: Nigh-Smith Pictures
- Distributed by: Vitagraph Company of America
- Release date: January 18, 1925
- Running time: 6 reels
- Country: United States
- Languages: Silent; English intertitles

Fear-Bound is a 1925 American silent Western film directed by William Nigh and starring Marjorie Daw, William Nigh, and Niles Welch. The film was produced by Nigh-Smith Pictures Corp. and released by Vitagraph in January 1925.

== Plot ==
As described in a review in a film magazine, deserted by her shiftless husband and three sons, Ma Tumble works the little farm and raises her infant daughter Falfi. Fifteen years later Falfi meets a stranger who proves to be the youngest son Jim. Falfi pleads so with Ma that she lets him stay. The arrival of the sheriff finds Jim crazed with fear as he had aided his father and brothers in a bank robbery. A soldier appears and tells the family that Jim died in France a hero in the war. To escape the law, the family moves to another state and Falfi opens a restaurant. All goes well until Pa and the brothers appear. The soldier Tod, now a mine owner, gets Jim a job as a guard at the mine and, though afraid, he accepts. When money for the mine is to be transported, his shiftless father makes him change uniforms with his brother and they go to rob the money wagon. Jim, cowering in fear, binds himself to his bed. Ma discovers him and the deception, and Jim admits he always was a coward and says he hid in France so as to be captured. He slinks away from the house and meets his father and brothers. The youngest taunts him about being yellow, and Jim suddenly finds himself and fights them all. When the youngest brother turns to help Jim, they subdue the others. Jim is once again proclaimed a hero and Tod decides to marry Falfi.

== Cast ==
- Marjorie Daw as Falfi Tumble
- William Nigh as Jim Tumble
- Niles Welch as Tod Vane
- Louise Mackintosh as Ma Tumble
- Edward Roseman as Pa Tumble
- James Bradbury Jr. as Luke Tumble
- Warner Richmond as Ed Tumble
- Dexter McReynolds as Alkali Red
- Jean Jarvis as Fluffy Ralston
- Frank Conlan as Cooky

== Preservation ==
Fear-Bound is currently presumed lost. In February of 2021, the film was cited by the National Film Preservation Board on their Lost U.S. Silent Feature Films list.
