= Martin Spellman =

American child actor (1925–2020)

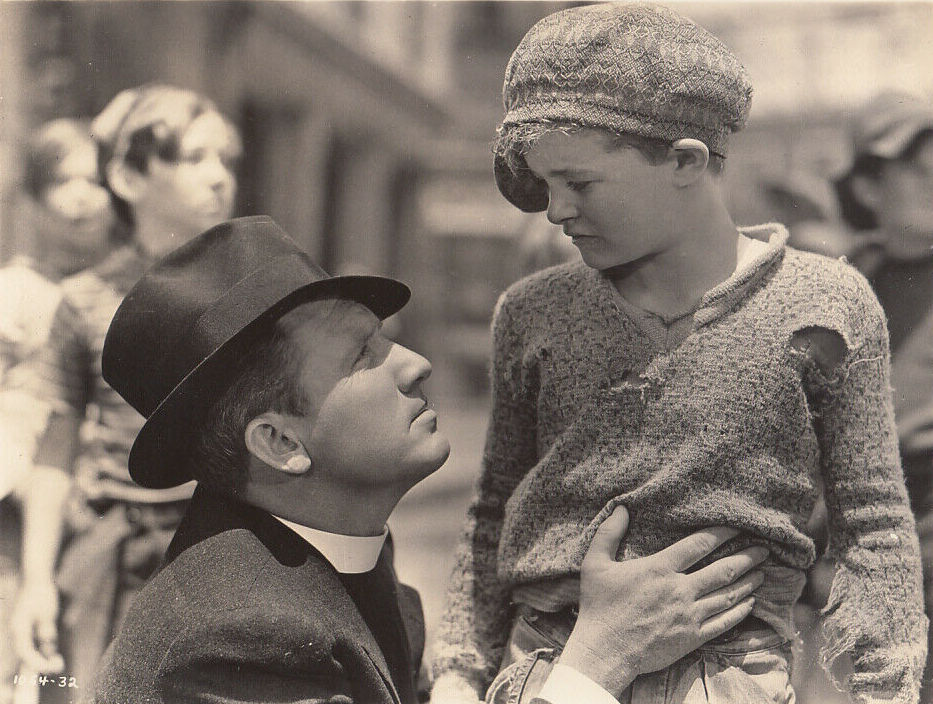
- Spencer Tracy and Spellman in Boys Town (1938)
- Born: Martin Spellman IV; October 8, 1925; Des Moines, Iowa, U.S.
- Died: May 6, 2020 (aged 94); Vancouver, Washington, U.S.
- Occupation: Child actor
- Years active: 1938–1957

Martin Spellman IV (October 8, 1925 – May 6, 2020) was an American child actor active in films during the 1930s and 1940s.

== Career ==
Martin Spellman IV was born in 1925 in Des Moines, Iowa. After his family moved to California, at the age of 9 he first entered the MGM studios not as a prospective actor but as a newsboy.

Spellman became such a familiar figure at MGM that for Christmas 1937, they decided to give him a very special Christmas present. Clark Gable invited him to work as an extra for a few days on the film Test Pilot where he had an uncredited role. After that, he played Skinny in the 1938 film Boys Town, starring Spencer Tracy and Mickey Rooney. In 1939, he co-starred in Streets of New York with Jackie Cooper. The following year he had another leading role in Son of the Navy with Jean Parker and James Dunn.

Spellman's film career ended in 1941. He then enlisted in the United States Army Air Corps during World War II. Returning to civilian life, he spent 27 years in the business world, and then switched to automobile finance and insurance.

Spellman died in Vancouver, Washington in May, 2020, at the age of 94.

== Filmography ==
Year	Title	Role
1938	Test Pilot	Kid
1938	Boys Town	Skinny
1938	Sharpshooters	Prince Michael Martin
1938	Santa Fe Stampede	Billy Carson
1938	I Am a Criminal	Bobby
1939	Let Us Live	Jimmy Dugan
1939	Beau Geste	Digby Geste as a child
1939	The Streets of New York	William McKinley 'Gimpy' Smith
1939	Law of the Wolf	Johnny
1939	Fangs of the Wild	Buddy Brady
1940	Son of the Navy	Tommy
1940	Hold That Woman!	Mike Mulvaney
1941	Meet the Chump	Champ
1941	Confessions of Boston Blackie	Jimmy Parrish

== Bibliography ==
- Holmstrom, John (1996). The Moving Picture Boy: An International Encyclopaedia from 1895 to 1995. Norwich: Michael Russell, p. 154.
