= Marry the Boss's Daughter =

1941 film

- Theatrical release poster
- Directed by: Thornton Freeland
- Screenplay by: Jack Andrews
- Produced by: Lou L. Ostrow
- Starring: Brenda Joyce; Bruce Edwards; George Barbier; Hardie Albright; Ludwig Stössel; Bodil Rosing
- Cinematography: Charles G. Clarke
- Edited by: Louis R. Loeffler
- Music by: Cyril J. Mockridge
- Production company: 20th Century-Fox
- Distributed by: 20th Century-Fox
- Release date: November 28, 1941
- Running time: 60 minutes
- Country: United States
- Language: English

Marry the Boss's Daughter is a 1941 American comedy film directed by Thornton Freeland and written by Jack Andrews. The film stars Brenda Joyce, Bruce Edwards, George Barbier, Hardie Albright, Ludwig Stössel and Bodil Rosing. The film was released on November 28, 1941, by 20th Century-Fox.

== Plot ==
Jefferson Cole moves in to New York City looking for a job, he fails to find a job, but finds a lost dog, he discovers that the dog belongs to Fredericka Barrett and returns it to her. She takes a liking to Cole and gets her businessman father J.W. Barrett to offer a job to Cole.

== Cast ==
- Brenda Joyce as Fredericka Barrett
- Bruce Edwards as Jefferson Cole
- George Barbier as J.W. Barrett
- Hardie Albright as Putnam Palmer
- Ludwig Stössel as Franz Polgar
- Bodil Rosing as Mrs. Polgar
- Brandon Tynan as Mr. Dawson
- Charles Arnt as Blodgett
- George Meeker as Snavely
- Frank McGlynn, Sr. as Hoffman
- Eula Guy as Miss Simpson
- Ray Walker as Elevator Operator
- Adrian Morris as Subway Guard
