= Mr. Wise Guy =

1942 film by William Nigh

- Directed by: William Nigh
- Screenplay by: Sam Robins; Harvey Gates; Jack Henley
- Story by: Martin Mooney
- Produced by: Sam Katzman (producer); Barney A. Sarecky (associate producer); Jack Dietz (producer)
- Starring: East Side Kids
- Cinematography: Arthur Reed
- Edited by: Carl Pierson
- Distributed by: Monogram Pictures
- Release date: February 20, 1942
- Running time: 70 minutes
- Country: United States
- Language: English

Mr. Wise Guy is a 1942 American film starring The East Side Kids and directed by William Nigh.

== Plot ==
In New York, the East Side youth gang, consisting of: Muggs McGinnis, Danny Collins, Glimpy Stone, Scruno, Skinny, and Peewee are falsely arrested on the wharf because the truck they are playing in was stolen. They are remanded to Wilton Reform School, where Muggs, the wise-cracking leader of the gang, is dubbed "Mr. Wise Guy" by the brutal guard Jed Miller.

Jim Barnes, the new warden, reassures Danny's older brother Bill, who has bad memories of the school from when he served as a guard there, that his testimony describing the place's cruelty eventually resulted in the dismissal of the former warden and the adoption of gentler rules. Bill is given a tour of the school by Barnes's secretary, Ann Mitchell, and later takes her out to dinner.

That night, while Bill buys cigarettes in a drugstore, escaped convict Luke Manning robs the place and murders the clerk. Manning takes Bill hostage in his car and forces him to lead the police on a chase. Manning escapes when Bill crashes the car, and Bill is later convicted of robbery and murder and sentenced to execution.

In the reform school, the boys have been battling with two toughs, "Rice Pudding" Charlie and Chalky Jones, but when Barnes witnesses Miller encouraging a fistfight, he demands Miller's resignation. Chalky tries to get the kids in trouble by informing Barnes of their plans to run away, but in an effort to establish a code of honor, Barnes punishes Chalky for being an informer.

When Muggs and his pals see newsreel footage of a man and woman accepting the winnings from a lottery, they recognize the man as Knobby, the driver of the stolen truck. They link Knobby to Manning based on information given to them by Charlie, who is Manning's nephew. Armed with information that could prove Bill's innocence, the boys escape from the reform school and go to the apartment of Dorothy Melton, the woman from the newsreel. The kids hold the pair, who had been planning to leave town with the lottery money which actually belongs to Manning, who was afraid of being seen. Manning appears at Dorothy's apartment to demand his money and hits Dorothy for double-crossing him with Knobby. Before the situation can worsen, the police arrive and arrest the criminals. Bill gets a reprieve from the governor, and Ann and the boys see him off as he reports for active military duty. Upon seeing Miller also being drafted, Bill tell his Sergeant to book him up for the guard house before Bill starts to beat up Miller while the boys are watching and cheering.

== Cast ==
=== The East Side Kids ===
- Leo Gorcey as Ethelbert 'Muggs' McGinnis
- Bobby Jordan as Danny Collins
- Huntz Hall as Glimpy Stone
- Ernest Morrison as Scruno (uncredited)
- David Gorcey as Pewee
- Bill Lawrence as Skinny

=== Additional cast ===
- Gabriel Dell as Charlie Manning
- Bobby Stone as Chalky Jones
- Sidney Miller as Charlie Horse
- Billy Gilbert as Knobby
- Guinn 'Big Boy' Williams as Luke Manning
- Douglas Fowley as Bill Collins
- Joan Barclay as Ann Mitchell
- Warren Hymer as Dratler
- Ann Doran as Dorothy Melton
- Jack Mulhall as Jim Barnes
- Benny Rubin as Second Waiter

== Production ==
Gabriel Dell's first East Side Kids film. Like Huntz Hall, Dell was simultaneously doing both this series and Universal's Dead End Kids and Little Tough Guys series. Unlike the Dead End Kids films, in most of Dell's East Side Kids films, he portrayed a villain, rather than a member of the gang.
