= Anthony Warde =

American actor (1909–1975)

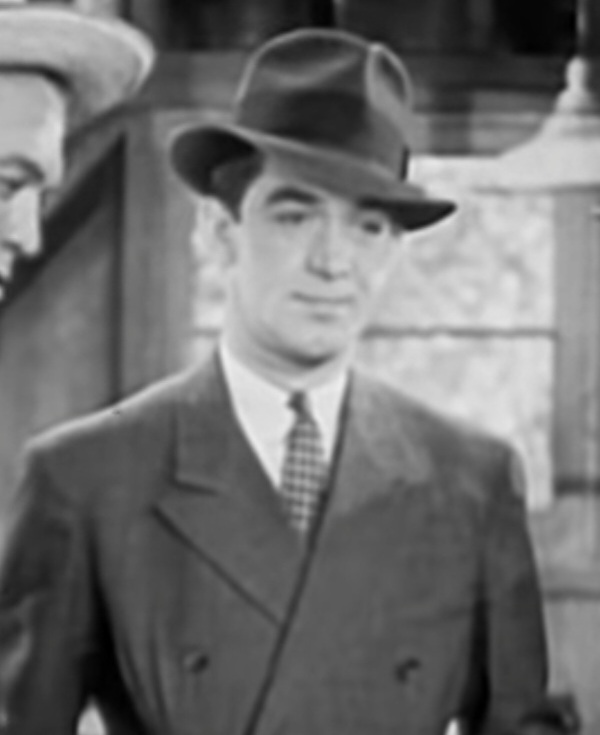
- Warde in Escape by Night (1937)
- Born: Benjamin Schwartz; January 1, 1909; Philadelphia, Pennsylvania, U.S.
- Died: January 8, 1975 (aged 66); Hollywood, California, U.S.
- Occupation: Actor
- Years active: 1937–1964

Anthony Warde (born Benjamin Schwartz; January 1, 1909 – January 8, 1975) was an American actor who appeared in over 150 movies from 1937 to 1964.

== Early years ==
Born as Benjamin Schwartz in Philadelphia, Pennsylvania on New Year's Day 1909, Warde was raised in Danbury, Connecticut.

== Stage ==
Warde gained early acting experience at the Pasadena Playhouse and performed with the Federal Theatre Project. In 1940, he toured with the Eighteen Actors dramatic group, which included Victor Jory and Morris Ankrum, among others. In 1953, he worked in summer stock theatre.

== Film ==
Warde started his Hollywood career in Escape by Night, appearing in a handful of undistinguished feature films before gaining popularity as one of the hardest working henchmen in the 1930s and 1940s serials.

Warde first appeared in his first film bow in 1936, but he spent most of his time bothering serials heroes as a vicious bodyguard, underground leader or infamous rustler, but also was satisfactory in character roles and the occasional sympathetic part. Usually, he played in many unsavory characterizations, including low-budget crime and Western styles throughout his career. He also appeared in popular serials such as Flash Gordon's Trip to Mars (1938), for Universal; The Spider Returns (1941) and Batman (1943) for Columbia, as well as in The Masked Marvel (1943), The Purple Monster Strikes (1945) and The Black Widow (1947) for Republic.

But Warde is probably best remembered for playing Killer Kane, gangster ruler of the Earth in Universal's adaptation of Buck Rogers (1939). In the 1950s, he made a multiple number of TV appearances including a brief turn as a counterfeiter in two episodes of Amos 'n' Andy.

Warde made his last screen appearance in The Carpetbaggers, a 1964 film adaptation of Harold Robbins' best-seller novel. Following his acting career, he owned a men's clothing store.

== Death ==
Warde died in Hollywood, California at the age of 66.

== Selected filmography ==
=== Films ===
- Escape by Night (1937) - Mike Grayson
- A Girl with Ideas (1937) - Gangster (uncredited)
- Tim Tyler's Luck (1937, Serial) - Garry Drake
- Hollywood Stadium Mystery (1938) - Krim in Play (uncredited)
- King of the Newsboys (1938) - Henchman (uncredited)
- Flash Gordon's Trip to Mars (1938, Serial) - King Turan of the Forest People [Chs. 7, 11, 13]
- Law of the Underworld (1938) - Larry (uncredited)
- The Saint in New York (1938) - Maury Yule (uncredited)
- Marie Antoinette (1938) - Marat (uncredited)
- The Crowd Roars (1938) - Cain's Third Bodyguard (uncredited)
- Come On, Leathernecks! (1938) - Nick
- The Affairs of Annabel (1938) - Bailey
- The Storm (1938) - Sailor (uncredited)
- Newsboys' Home (1938) - Blake (uncredited)
- Pacific Liner (1939) - Crew Member (uncredited)
- Risky Business (1939) - Jackson's Henchman (uncredited)
- Twelve Crowded Hours (1939) - Jerry Miller (uncredited)
- Almost a Gentleman (1939) - Kidnapper (uncredited)
- Buck Rogers (1939, Serial) - Killer Kane
- Tell No Tales (1939) - Frankie Lewis (uncredited)
- Mr. Moto Takes a Vacation (1939) - Joe Rubla
- Dust Be My Destiny (1939) - Second Thug on Train (uncredited)
- Oklahoma Frontier (1939) - Wayne
- The Amazing Mr. Williams (1939) - Bouncer (uncredited)
- Chip of the Flying U (1939) - Ed Duncan
- Charlie McCarthy, Detective (1939) - Photographer (uncredited)
- The Earl of Chicago (1940) - Kilmount Salesman (uncredited)
- Florian (1940) - Rider (uncredited)
- Millionaires in Prison (1940) - Max, Convict (uncredited)
- The Sea Hawk (1940) - Whipper (uncredited)
- So You Won't Talk (1940) - Dolf
- The Green Archer (1940, Serial) - Lefty Brent (uncredited)
- Ridin' on a Rainbow (1941) - Scoop Morrison, Bank Robber
- Lady from Louisiana (1941) - Lottery Thug (uncredited)
- The Spider Returns (1941, Serial) - Henchman Trigger
- Singapore Woman (1941) - Tough Seaman in Crow's Nest (uncredited)
- Down in San Diego (1941) - Tony
- Blues in the Night (1941) - Del's Henchman #1 (uncredited)
- Johnny Eager (1941) - Guard Outside Luce's Office Door (uncredited)
- Dick Tracy vs. Crime Inc. (1941) - John Corey
- The Man with Two Lives (1942) - Hugo
- Broadway (1942) - Gangster (uncredited)
- Timber (1942) - Henchman (uncredited)
- Eyes of the Underworld (1942) - Doorman (uncredited)
- King of the Mounties (1942, Serial) - Stark
- Pittsburgh (1942) - Kane's Fight Attendant (uncredited)
- Silent Witness (1943) - Racketeer Lou Manson
- Keep 'Em Slugging (1943) - Thug (uncredited)
- The Ghost and the Guest (1943) - Killer Blake
- Shantytown (1943) - Gangster (uncredited)
- White Savage (1943) - Clerk
- A Gentle Gangster (1943) - Charles
- I Escaped from the Gestapo (1943) - Lokin
- Three Hearts for Julia (1943) - Reporter at Army Concert Hall (uncredited)
- Captive Wild Woman (1943) - Tony - Handler (uncredited)
- Crime Doctor (1943) - First Reporter in Court (uncredited)
- Batman (1943, Serial) - Stone (uncredited)
- Secret Service in Darkest Africa (1943, Serial) - Relzah [Ch. 12-13] (uncredited)
- The Masked Marvel (1943, Serial) - 'Killer' Mace
- So's Your Uncle (1943) - Stagehand
- Where Are Your Children? (1943) - Jim Lawson
- Riders of the Deadline (1943) - 'Gunner' Madigan
- The Desert Song (1943) - French Soldier (uncredited)
- The Phantom (1943, Serial) - Karak (uncredited)
- The Impostor (1944) - Soldier (uncredited)
- The Great Alaskan Mystery (1944, Serial) - Brandon [Chs. 3-13]
- Follow the Boys (1944) - Captain (uncredited)
- The Chinese Cat (1944) - Catlen
- Waterfront (1944) - 2nd Waterfront Sailor (uncredited)
- Are These Our Parents? (1944) - Sam Bailey
- Sensations of 1945 (1944) - Moroni (uncredited)
- The Mummy's Ghost (1944) - Detective (uncredited)
- Dixie Jamboree (1944) - 'Double', Phony Indian
- Machine Gun Mama (1944) - Carlos
- Shadow of Suspicion (1944) - Bill Randall
- Mystery of the River Boat (1944, Serial) - Bruno Bloch
- Brenda Starr, Reporter (1945, Serial) - Muller [Ch 1-10] (uncredited)
- Here Come the Co-Eds (1945) - Carlton Basketball Coach (uncredited)
- There Goes Kelly (1945) - Bob Farrell
- The Cisco Kid Returns (1945) - Paul Conway
- The Monster and the Ape (1945, Serial) - Joe Flint- Henchman
- Bewitched (1945) - Masher on Street (uncredited)
- The Purple Monster Strikes (1945, Serial) - Tony [Ch. 7]
- Secrets of a Sorority Girl (1945) - Nick Vegas
- Paris Underground (1945) - Underground Leader (uncredited)
- Allotment Wives (1945) - Joe Agnew
- Captain Tugboat Annie (1945) - Jake
- Black Market Babies (1945) - Paul Carroll
- The Mask of Diijon (1946) - Hold-up Man (uncredited)
- Hop Harrigan (1946, Serial) - Edwards
- The Wife of Monte Cristo (1946) - Captain Benoit
- King of the Forest Rangers (1946, Serial) - Burt Spear
- Dark Alibi (1946) - Jimmy Slade
- The Mysterious Mr. M (1946, Serial) - Martin Brandon (uncredited)
- The Missing Lady (1946) - Henchman Lefty
- Wife Wanted (1946) - Friendship Club Con Artist (uncredited)
- Don Ricardo Returns (1946) - Don Jose Luerra
- The Thirteenth Hour (1947) - Ranford
- Bells of San Fernando (1947) - Juan Mendoza, Overseer
- Killer Dill (1947) - Louie Moronie
- High Tide (1947) - Nick Dyke
- That Hagen Girl (1947) - Eddie - Pushy Night Club Patron (uncredited)
- The Black Widow (1947, Serial) - Nick Ward
- King of the Bandits (1947) - Smoke Kirby
- Devil Ship (1947) - Burke
- Panhandle (1948) - Kenney (uncredited)
- Here Comes Trouble (1948) - Police Reporter (uncredited)
- Dangers of the Canadian Mounted (1948, Serial) - Mort Fowler
- The Dude Goes West (1948) - Barney - the Bartender (uncredited)
- Stage Struck (1948) - Mr. Barda
- The Big Punch (1948) - Con Festig
- Congo Bill (1948, Serial) - Rogan
- Fighting Fools (1949) - Marty, a Henchman (uncredited)
- Trail of the Yukon (1949) - Muskeg Joe
- Radar Patrol vs. Spy King (1949, Serial) - Ricco Morgan
- South Sea Sinner (1950) - First Policeman (uncredited)
- Storm Warning (1951) - Jukebox Collector (uncredited)
- The Lemon Drop Kid (1951) - Thoughtful Man (uncredited)
- Roaring City (1951) - Bill Rafferty
- Mysterious Island (1951, Serial) - Confederate Officer (uncredited)
- The Atomic City (1952) - Arnie Molter
- Hurricane Smith (1952) - Bos'n (uncredited)
- The Stars Are Singing (1953) - Bit Role (uncredited)
- The War of the Worlds (1953) - Military Police Driver (uncredited)
- The Girl Who Had Everything (1953) - Victor's Colleague (uncredited)
- Houdini (1953) - Master of Ceremonies (uncredited)
- Here Come the Girls (1953) - Moretti - Clown in Dressing Room (uncredited)
- Casanova's Big Night (1954) - Gondolier (uncredited)
- Rear Window (1954) - Detective (uncredited)
- Day of Triumph (1954) - Barabbas
- Strategic Air Command (1955) - Yakotda Controller (uncredited)
- The Man Who Knew Too Much (1956) - French Policeman (uncredited)
- The Delicate Delinquent (1957) - Police Academy Drill Instructor (uncredited)
- Inside the Mafia (1959) - Bob Kalen (uncredited)
- The Carpetbaggers (1964) - Moroni

=== Television ===
- The Amos 'n Andy Show (1951-1953) - Joe / Frankie
- Sky King (1952) - Vic Lawrence
- The Abbott and Costello Show (1953) - Blackie
- The Loretta Young Show (1954)
- Topper (1955) - Barco
- The Adventures of Jim Bowie (1956) - Deshon
- The Life and Legend of Wyatt Earp (1960) - Curt Dance
- The Jack Benny Show (1961)
- Mister Ed (1961–63) - Sam Morgan / Policeman
