= Men of Texas =

1942 film by Ray Enright

- Directed by: Ray Enright
- Written by: Harold Shumate; Richard Brooks
- Produced by: George Waggner
- Starring: Robert Stack; Broderick Crawford; Jackie Cooper; Anne Gwynne; Ralph Bellamy; Jane Darwell; Leo Carrillo; John Litel; Addison Richards
- Cinematography: Milton Krasner
- Edited by: Clarence Kolster
- Music by: Edward Ward
- Production company: Universal Pictures
- Distributed by: Universal Pictures
- Release date: July 3, 1942
- Running time: 82 minutes
- Country: United States
- Language: English

Men of Texas is a 1942 American Western film directed by Ray Enright and starring Robert Stack and Broderick Crawford.

== Plot ==
Chicago newspaper employees Sam Sawyer and Barry Conovan have been assigned to track down Sam Houston in Huntsville, Texas, unaware he died years before. Renegade guerrilla leader Henry Clay Jackson does not want Texas re-admitted as one of the United States, but is intent on restoring it as a republic. As he and his gang raid and loot Texas, Jackson believes himself to be following in the footsteps of Houston. When Jackson is about to be hanged for his crimes, Houston's ghost rises from his grave to tell Jackson he was wrong.

== Cast ==
- Robert Stack as Barry Conovan
- Broderick Crawford as Henry Clay Jackson
- Jackie Cooper as Robert Houston Scott
- Anne Gwynne as Jane Baxter Scott
- Ralph Bellamy as Major Lamphere
- Jane Darwell as Hattie Florence Scott
- Leo Carrillo as Sam Sawyer
- John Litel as Colonel Colbert Scott
- Addison Richards as Silas Hurlbert
- William Farnum as Sam Houston
- Janet Beecher as Margaret Lea Houston
- J. Frank Hamilton as Dwight Douglass
- Kay Linaker as Sarah Olsen
- Joseph Crehan as Luther Crittenden

== Production ==
The film was originally called Deep in the Heart of Texas and filming started May 1942.

== Reception ==
The New York Times said it "provides ample entertainment."
