= Corregidor (film) =

1943 film by William Nigh

- Original film poster
- Directed by: William Nigh
- Written by: Doris Malloy (writer); George Wellington Pardy (story); Edgar G. Ulmer (writer)
- Produced by: Edward Finney (producer); Dixon R. Harwin (producer); Peter R. Van Duinen (executive producer)
- Starring: Otto Kruger; Elissa Landi; Donald Woods; Frank Jenks
- Narrated by: Alfred Noyes (Epilogue)
- Cinematography: Ira H. Morgan
- Edited by: Charles Henkel Jr.
- Music by: Leo Erdody
- Production company: Atlantis Pictures Corporation
- Distributed by: Producers Releasing Corporation
- Release date: March 29, 1943
- Running time: 73 minutes
- Country: United States
- Language: English

Corregidor is a 1943 American war film directed by William Nigh and starring Otto Kruger, Elissa Landi and Donald Woods. The film is set in December 1941 through May 1942 during the Japanese invasion of the Philippines. Corregidor opens with the following written dedication: "Dedicated to the heroes of the United States and Philippine Armed Forces, and the American Red Cross." The film closes with a poem about Corregidor written and narrated by English poet Alfred Noyes.

== Plot ==
Shortly before the Japanese attack on Pearl Harbor, Dr. Royce Lee and her maid Hyacinth arrive at Manoi Island in the Philippines. Royce and her fiancé Dr. Jan Stockman are married by a local priest, but the ceremony is interrupted by a Japanese attack. In the bombing, Hyacinth is killed. With Japanese invasion forces all around, Royce and Jan join American soldiers making a forced march to Manila, 600 miles away.

The small group comes under attack, and Jan is wounded. The leader of the American soldiers falls ill with malaria, and commits suicide in order to not hold up the retreating soldiers. Several days later, the group reaches the rocky island of Corregidor, where American forces are holding out in a cavern.

At Corregidor, one of the soldiers, "Pinky" Mason, reunites with nurse Jane "Hey-Dutch" Van Dornen, his girlfriend. Royce and Jan work in the army hospital, where Royce realizes her former love, Dr. Michael is also there. With diminishing supplies threatening their survival, the small band of Americans and Filipino defenders face a relentless Japanese attack.

While working as a stretcher bearer, Dutch is wounded. On her deathbed, she and Pinky are married but Dutch dies soon after. Jan is also wounded again and dies when the makeshift hospital is bombed. When ammunition runs out, Pinky and the soldiers engage in hand-to-hand combat with the Japanese.

Below ground, in the midst of an air attack, Royce delivers a Filipino baby and then receives news from Michael that her husband has died. Royce and the nurses are ordered to evacuate immediately. She vows to reunite with Michael after the war. Pinky is the tail gunner in the aircraft but dies in a valiant defense of the nurses.

At Corregidor, the lack of supplies forces Michael to operate on the wounded without painkillers or gloves. When the radio operator files his last report, at home in the United States, Royce sheds tears for her lost friends.

== Cast ==
- Otto Kruger as Dr. Jan Stockman
- Elissa Landi as Dr. Royce Lee
- Donald Woods as Dr. Michael
- Frank Jenks as M/Sgt. Mahoney
- Rick Vallin as Sgt. "Pinky" Mason
- Wanda McKay as Nurse Jane "Hey-Dutch" Van Dornen
- Ian Keith as Capt. Morris
- Ted Hecht as Platoon lieutenant
- Charles Jordan as Bronx
- Frank Jaquet as Priest
- I. Stanford Jolley as Agitated soldier at barricade
- John Grant as Calm soldier at barricade
- Ruby Dandridge as Hyacinth

== Production ==
Principal photography on Corregidor took place from December 4 to mid-December 1942 at Fine Arts Studios. Some scenes were shot on location at Sherwood Lake, California. The release of Corregidor was delayed by almost a month in order to work on the production. (Note: Stock footage of the Boeing 314 Clipper was featured along with newsreel photography of Japanese bombers. A number of models were also evident.)

== Reception ==
Film historian Alun Evans reviewed Corregidor in Brassey's Guide to War Films (2000), comparing and contrasting it to other contemporary features also dealing with the fall of the Philippines, Bataan (1943), The Eve of St. Mark, (1944) and They Were Expendable (1945). He noted that " (Director) Nigh was the first to cash in on the fall of the Philippines island to the Japanese in May 1942, but turned it into a turgid romance."
