= She-Wolf of London (film) =

1946 film by Jean Yarbrough

- Theatrical release poster
- Directed by: Jean Yarbrough
- Screenplay by: George Bricker
- Story by: Dwight V. Babcock
- Produced by: Ben Pivar
- Starring: June Lockhart; Don Porter; Sara Haden; Eily Malyon; Jan Wiley; Lloyd Corrigan
- Cinematography: Maury Gertsman
- Edited by: Paul Landres
- Music by: William Lava
- Production company: Universal Pictures Company, Inc.
- Distributed by: Universal Pictures Company, Inc.
- Release dates: 5 April 1946 (New York); 17 May 1946
- Running time: 61 minutes
- Country: United States
- Language: English

She-Wolf of London is a 1946 American mystery and horror film directed by Jean Yarbrough. It stars June Lockhart and Don Porter. The film is set in London in the early 20th century, where a series of murders have recently occurred. An aunt then tells an innocent young lady that the blood of a werewolf runs in her family and that she is responsible for the deaths. The woman then immediately ends her engagement, leading her partner to begin investigating the strange case on his own.

== Plot ==
In London at the beginning of the twentieth century, Phyllis Allenby is a young and beautiful woman who is soon to be married to barrister and boyfriend Barry Lanfield. Phyllis is living at the Allenby Mansion without the protection of a male, along with her aunt Martha and her cousin Carol and the servant Hannah. As the wedding date approaches, London is shocked by a series of murders at the local park, where the victims are discovered with throats ripped out. Many of the detectives at Scotland Yard begin murmuring about werewolves, while Inspector Pierce believes the opposite and suspects strange activity at the Allenby Mansion (which is near the park), where the "Wolf-Woman" is seen prowling at night and heading for the park.

Phyllis becomes extremely terrified and anxious, since she is convinced that she is the "Wolf-Woman", deeply believing in the legend of the so-called "Curse of the Allenbys". Aunt Martha tries to convince Phyllis how ridiculous the legend sounds, while she (Aunt Martha) and Carol are suspicious in their own ways. Phyllis each day denies Barry visiting her, and when a suspicious detective is murdered soon after he visits the mansion in the same way the other victims perished, Barry begins believing that something else is going on beside the so-called "Werewolf murders", and makes his own investigations both of the park and the mansion. It turns out that Aunt Martha did the attacks to convince Phyllis she was insane, and belonged in an asylum rather than married to Barry, so Martha and her daughter could remain living in the mansion and that she also attacked Dwight, Carol's greengrocer boyfriend, so that he couldn't get in the way of Carol and Barry's relationship.

However, as Aunt Martha is about to kill Phyllis with a knife, Hannah hears all of this and threatens to go to the police. Martha chases her down the stairs but trips and falls on her knife, killing her. The house door opens and Barry, Carol, and the police come in with Hannah telling them that Martha did the attacks and is the 'she-wolf'. Barry then comforts Phyllis and tells her that Martha is dead, and the two hug one another.

== Cast ==
- June Lockhart as Phyllis Allenby
- Don Porter as Barry Lanfield
- Sara Haden as Martha Winthrop
- Jan Wiley as Carol Winthrop
- Lloyd Corrigan as Det. Latham
- Dennis Hoey as Inspector Pierce
- Martin Kosleck as Dwight Severn
- Eily Malyon as Hannah, the housekeeper
- Frederick Worlock as Constable-in-Charge Ernie Hobbs
- Olaf Hytten as Constable Alfred (uncredited)

== Production ==
Una O'Connor was initially set to be in the cast, but was dropped in favor of Eily Malyon. Forrester Harvey was also set to star in the film, but died on December 14, 1945. The film began shooting on December 8, and wrapped production on the 21st, three days over schedule. Don Porter recalled the last days of shooting, noting a scene with a buggy that was done as process shooting. Porter recalled that "they closed the set so people couldn't get away and go to all the Christmas parties on the other sets. We damned near starved to death. We smuggled some sandwiches and finally got the process right". He also recalled the "bee smoke" used in the park scenes made it difficult to talk, saying that "trying to do lines and keep from choking was a little difficult". June Lockhart recalled the film was "fun to do. If I'm remembering right, I was just submitted for it by my agent. I did it, and - I was not very good in it. But the following year I was the hot ingenue on Broadway in a wonderful comedy, so I guess what I needed [in She-Wolf] was a good direction".

== Release ==
She-Wolf of London was shown in New York on April 5, 1946 and received wider release by Universal Pictures on May 17. On its release in the United Kingdom, the film was titled The Curse of the Allenbys. She-Wolf of London was released on DVD as part of the "Wolf Man: The Legacy Collection" set which included The Wolf Man, Frankenstein Meets the Wolf Man and Werewolf of London. It was released again as a double feature with Werewolf of London on July 24, 2007.

== Reception ==
From contemporary reviews, Thomas M. Pryor of The New York Times wrote that "this latest release from Universal's bottom-drawer [...] it certainly doesn't justify the effort expended in its behalf". A reviewer in Harrison's Reports found it "boresome and long-drawn out" with a plot that "has been done many times [...] there is nothing about either the action or the characters that is horrifying or terrifying". Jack D. Grant of The Hollywood Reporter gave the film a positive review, noting Yaborough's ability to generate suspicions and that "it was a difficult task to balance these strange acts by other characters at the same time maintain the mood of the period piece". Dorothy Masters of The New York Daily News gave the film a two-and-a-half star rating, opining that the film "does a fancy job tight-rope walking until everything is keyed for jump in the right direction".

From retrospective reviews, the authors of the book Universal Horrors described the film as "the kind of chiller horror fans love to hate", specifically, one that teases the audience with horror themes only to disclose that the supernatural was not responsible for the horror previously, concluding that "there's absolutely no reason why George Bricker and Dwight V. Babcock could not have conceived the tale as a bonafide horror story rather than a predictable whodunit". Hans J. Wollstein of AllMovie also critiqued the story, finding it closer to a film of the silent film era" and that "She-Wolf of London should have come with a disclaimer. There is no "She-Wolf" in this quasi-horror opus, just a greedy old dame (Sara Haden) "gaslighting" poor, anemic June Lockhart in order to inherit the girl's fortune", while "Jean Yarborough and cameraman Maury Gertsman did their best to liven things up with odd camera angles and moody mise-en-scène, but all this was merely wasted on a typical Universal "B"".
