= Up in Mabel's Room =

Up in Mabel's Room may refer to:

- Up in Mabel's Room (play), a 1919 play written by Wilson Collison and Otto Harbach
- Up in Mabel's Room (1926 film), a 1926 silent film based on the play starring Marie Prevost
- Up in Mabel's Room (1944 film), a 1944 film remake of the 1926 film starring Marjorie Reynolds
- "Up in Mabel's Room", a song by the Everly Brothers from their 1971 album Stories We Could Tell
