= Doomed to Die (film) =

1940 film by William Nigh

- Film poster
- Directed by: William Nigh
- Written by: Hugh Wiley; Ralph Gilbert Bettison; Michael Jacoby
- Produced by: Paul Malvern; Scott R. Dunlap
- Starring: Boris Karloff; Marjorie Reynolds; Grant Withers
- Cinematography: Harry Neumann
- Edited by: Robert Golden
- Music by: Edward J. Kay
- Color process: Black and white
- Distributed by: Monogram Pictures Corporation
- Release date: August 12, 1940
- Running time: 68 minutes
- Country: United States
- Language: English

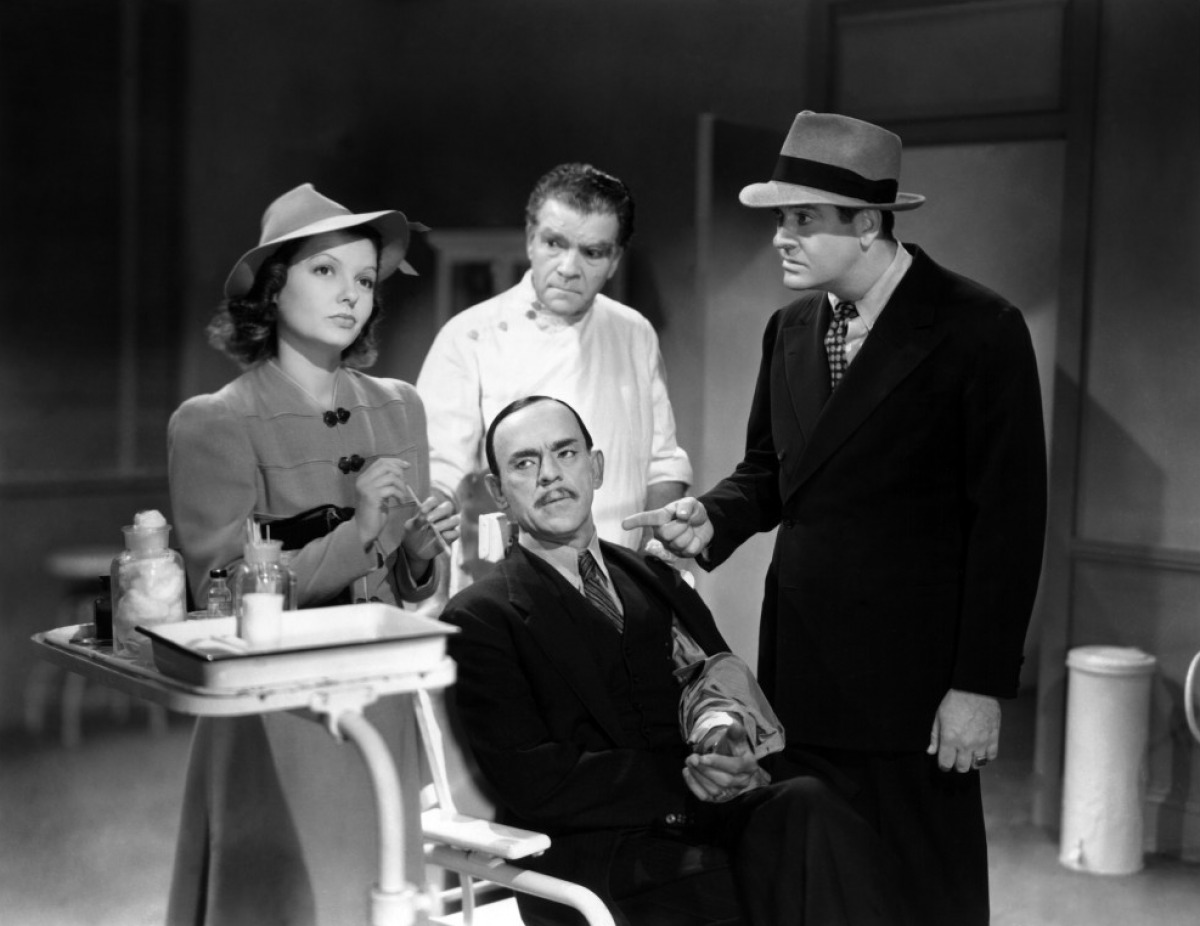
Boris Karloff seated. Standing L-R: Marjorie Reynolds, Gibson Gowland, Grant Withers

Doomed to Die is a 1940 American mystery film directed by William Nigh and starring Boris Karloff as Mr. Wong with Marjorie Reynolds and Grant Withers. It is a sequel to the 1940 film The Fatal Hour, which also features Withers and Reynolds.

== Plot ==
When the head of a shipping company is murdered in his office, suspicion is focused on the son of a competitor who is engaged to the dead man's daughter. The girl asks the detective Mr. Wong to investigate, hoping to prove that her fiancé is innocent.

The murder occurred a few days after one of the company's liners had caught fire and sunk, with the loss of more than 400 lives. Wong is given information by the leader of a powerful Chinese tong that leads him to other suspects. The tong leader tells Wong that one of their members was smuggling a large amount of tong money aboard the ship. The smuggler survived the sinking but disappeared with the tong's money.

Wong uses technology to recover seemingly lost evidence. He uncovers multiple conspiracies within the shipping company and proves that the original suspect is not the murderer.

== Cast ==
- Boris Karloff as James Lee Wong
- Marjorie Reynolds as Roberta "Bobbie" Logan
- Grant Withers as Capt. William "Bill" Street
- William Stelling as Dick Fleming
- Catherine Craig as Cynthia Wentworth
- Guy Usher – Paul Fleming
- Henry Brandon as Victor "Vic" Martin
- Melvin Lang as Cyrus P. Wentworth
- Wilbur Mack as Matthews
- Kenneth Harlan as Ludlow
- Richard Loo as Tong leader

== Production ==
Filming began in mid-June 1940. The film uses actual news footage from the burning of the liner SS Morro Castle, which caught fire on September 8, 1934 during a trip from Havana to New York City.
