= Wine, Women and Song (film) =

1933 film by Herbert Brenon

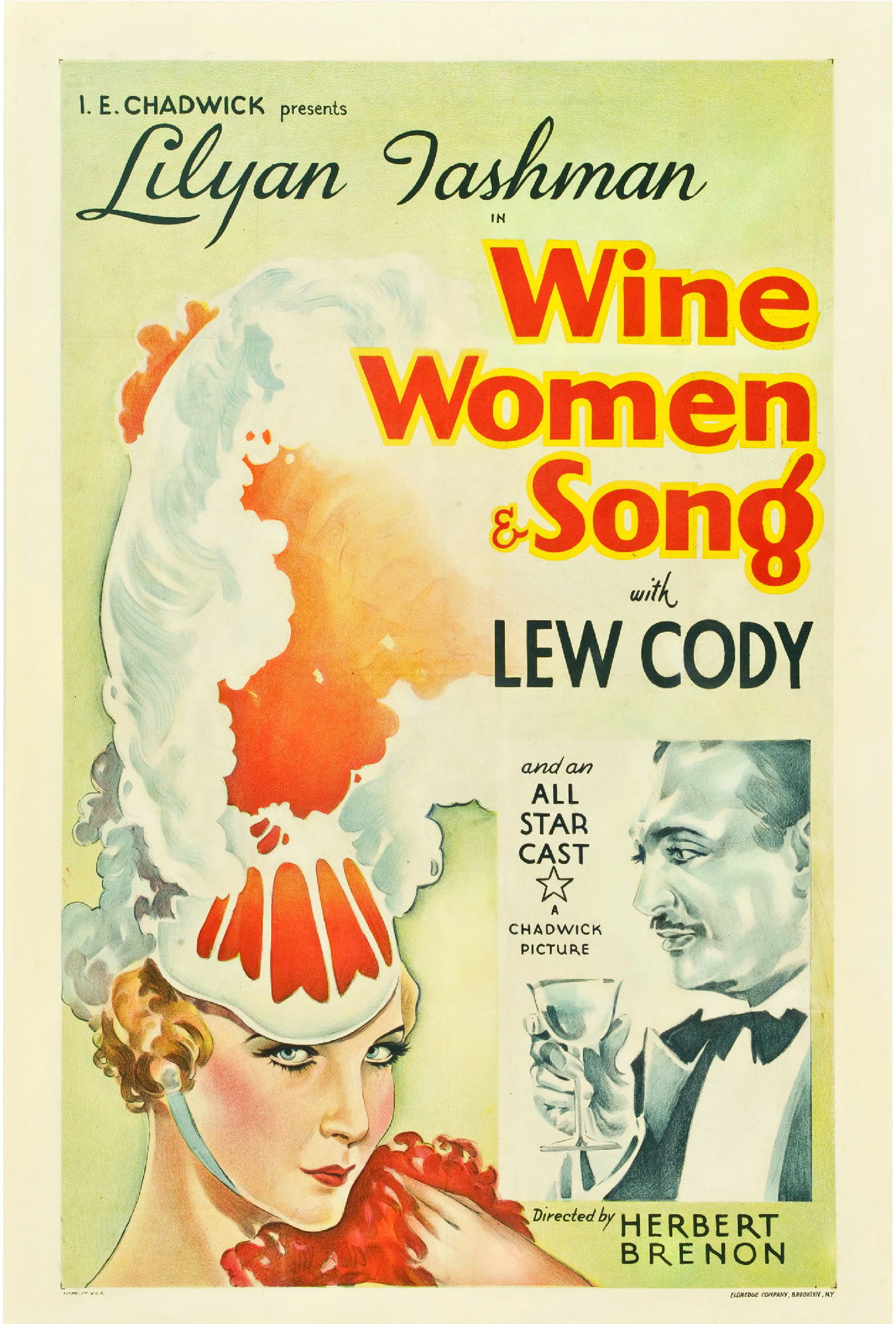
- Theatrical release poster
- Directed by: Herbert Brenon
- Written by: Leon D'Usseau (play)
- Produced by: I.E. Chadwick
- Starring: Lilyan Tashman; Lew Cody; Marjorie Reynolds
- Cinematography: Alvin Wyckoff
- Edited by: Carl Pierson
- Production company: Chadwick Pictures
- Distributed by: Monogram Pictures
- Release date: March 27, 1933
- Running time: 70 minutes
- Country: United States
- Language: English

Wine, Women and Song is a 1933 American pre-Code drama film directed by Herbert Brenon and starring Lilyan Tashman, Lew Cody and Marjorie Reynolds.

== Cast ==
- Lilyan Tashman as Frankie Arnette
- Lew Cody as Morgan Andrews
- Marjorie Reynolds as Marilyn Arnette
- Matty Kemp as Ray Joyce
- Paul Gregory as Don
- Gertrude Astor as Jennie Tilson
- Bobbe Arnst as Imogene
- Esther Muir as Lolly
- Jesse De Vorska as Irving
- Bobby Watson as Lawrence

== Bibliography ==
- Donald W. McCaffrey & Christopher P. Jacobs. Guide to the Silent Years of American Cinema. Greenwood Publishing, 1999. ISBN 0-313-30345-2
