= Oh, What a Night (1944 film) =

1944 film by William Beaudine

- Directed by: William Beaudine
- Written by: Marian Orth & Paul Gerard Smith
- Starring: Edmund Lowe; Jean Parker
- Distributed by: Monogram Pictures
- Release date: September 2, 1944
- Running time: 72 mins
- Country: United States
- Language: English

Oh, What A Night is a 1944 crime drama starring Edmund Lowe & Jean Parker and directed by William Beaudine.

The film's story was written by Marian Orth and the screenplay by Paul Gerard Smith.

== Plot ==
Jewel thieves Rand, Tom Gordon, Rocco, Boris, and Countess Sonya meet at the California Hotel to await Lillian Vanderhoven, a former burlesque dancer who is now a wealthy dowager and has acquired an expensive diamond known as the "Kimberly King Diamond". Alongside the group is Valerie, Gordon's niece. Valerie meets Rand and becomes convinced he and Gordon are friends on vacation. Rand meets a guest at the hotel, Detective Norris, who convinces him to keep the gemstone safe.

After Vanderhoven arrives to the hotel, Rand's valet Wyndy is with her, having posed as an English nobleman. Wyndy wishes to steal Vanderhoven's diamond, but learns of Rand's promise to Detective Norris.

That evening at a dinner party, Gordon dances with Vanderhoven and promptly steals the diamond. Rand decides to retrieve the gemstone, but doesn't want to alert Valerie, to whom he has become fond of, to the fact that her uncle is a thief. While Gordon is packing his suitcase in front of Valerie, Rand forces him to hand over the diamond at gunpoint. This act intentionally leaves Valerie thinking that Rand was the thief instead of Gordon. After leaving the gem with Norris, Rand and Wyndy leave the hotel. Due to his generous act, Rand convinces himself that there is honor among thieves.

== Cast ==
- Edmund Lowe as Rand
- Jean Parker as Valerie
- Marjorie Rambeau as Lil Vanderhoven
- Alan Dinehart as Detective Norris
- Pierre Watkin as Tom Gordon
- Ivan Lebedeff as Boris
- Claire Du Brey as Petrie
- Charles F. Miller as Sutton
- Olaf Hytten as Wyndy
- Karin Lang as Sonya
- George J. Lewis as Rocco
- Crane Whitley as Sullivan
- Charles Jordan as Murphy
- Dick Rush as Healy
- Eddie Cherkose
