= Ministry of Fear =

1944 film by Fritz Lang

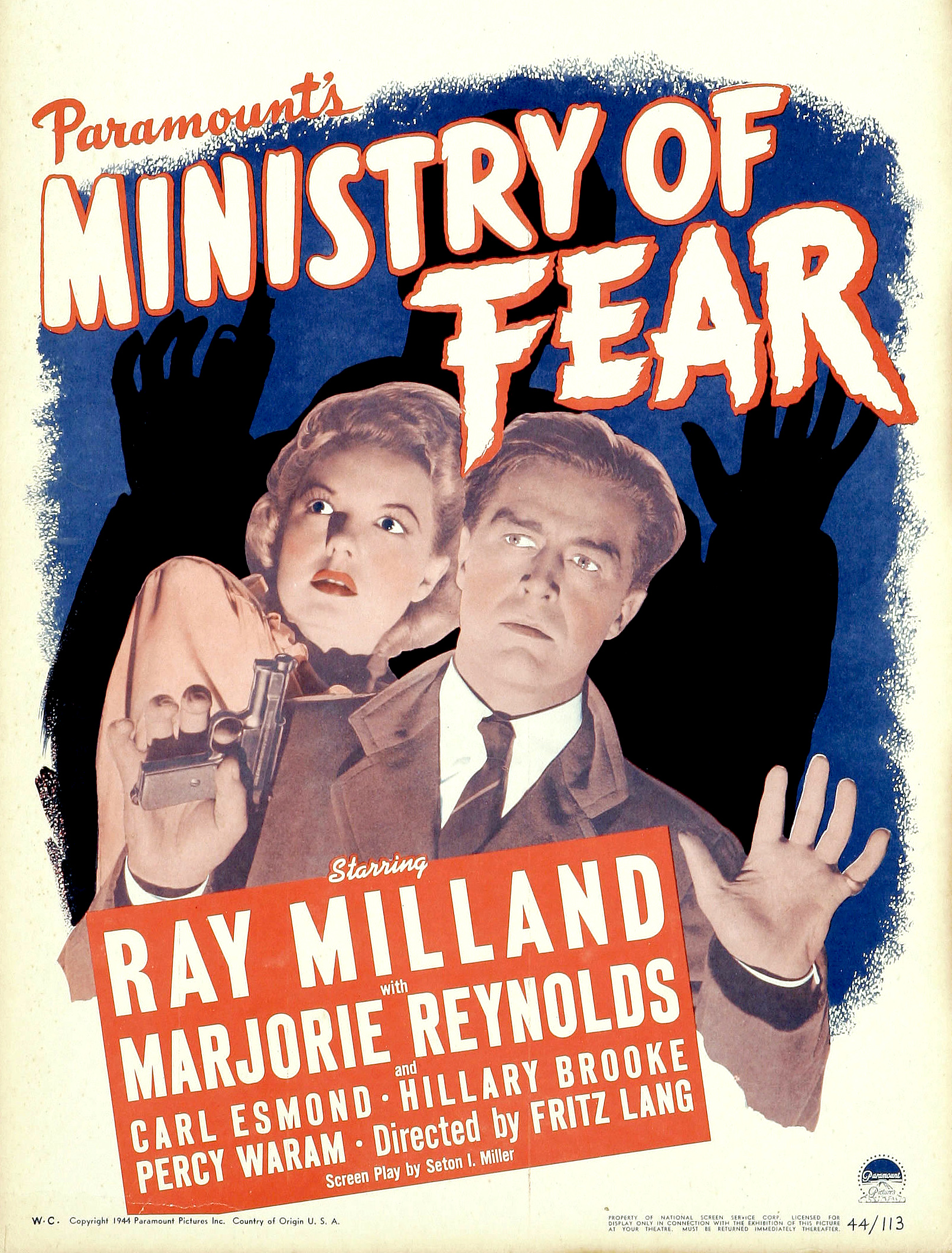
- Theatrical release poster
- Directed by: Fritz Lang
- Written by: Seton I. Miller
- Based on: The Ministry of Fear by Graham Greene
- Produced by: Buddy G. DeSylva
- Starring: Ray Milland; Marjorie Reynolds; Hillary Brooke; Carl Esmond
- Cinematography: Henry Sharp
- Edited by: Archie Marshek
- Music by: Victor Young
- Color process: Black and white
- Production company: Paramount Pictures
- Distributed by: Paramount Pictures
- Release date: December 31, 1944
- Running time: 87 minutes
- Country: United States
- Language: English

Ministry of Fear is a 1944 American spy thriller film noir directed by Fritz Lang and starring Ray Milland and Marjorie Reynolds. Based on the 1943 novel by Graham Greene, the film tells the story of a man just released from a mental asylum, who finds himself caught up in an international spy ring and pursued by Nazi agents after inadvertently receiving something they want. The original music for the film was composed by Victor Young.

== Plot ==
In wartime Britain during the Blitz, Stephen Neale is released from Lembridge Asylum. While waiting for a train to London, Neale visits a village fête hosted by the Mothers of Free Nations charity. He is urged to go to the palm reader's tent to have his fortune told by Mrs. Bellane, an older woman. He asks her to ignore the past and tell the future, which startles her. She cryptically tells him to enter a contest and guess the weight of a cake as 4 pounds 15 1/2 ounces (2.25 kg). Neale does so and wins the cake. Then, a young blond man hurries to see Mrs. Bellane. People try to persuade Neale to give the cake to the blond man, but Neale refuses.

Neale departs Lembridge with only a blind man sharing his train compartment. Neale offers him some cake. Neale sees the blind man crumbling his portion. When the train stops during an air raid, Neale's companion turns out not to be blind after all. He strikes Neale with his walking stick, steals the cake, and flees, with Neale in pursuit. The man shoots at him, but is killed by a German bomb. Neale finds the man's revolver and continues on to London.

Neale hires private detective George Rennit to help him investigate the Mothers of Free Nations. Neale meets Willi Hilfe and his sister Carla, refugees from Austria who run the charity. Willi takes him to Mrs. Bellane's London mansion (followed by Rennit). Neale is shocked to discover that this Mrs. Bellane is a beautiful young medium. She invites them to stay for her séance. Among the other attendees are artist Martha Penteel, psychiatrist Dr. Forrester, and Mr. Cost, the blond man at the fête. After the lights are dimmed, a mysterious voice claims she was poisoned by Neale, disconcerting him. Then a shot rings out – Cost is found shot dead. Neale admits to having the blind man's gun. He flees with Willi's help.

Neale goes to Rennit's office, only to find it ransacked. He talks to Carla. An air raid forces the two to shelter in an Underground station, where Neale reveals that he had planned to euthanize his terminally ill wife. He changed his mind, but she committed suicide using poison he had bought. Due to the circumstances, Neale received a light sentence of two years at the asylum.

The next morning, Carla hides Neale at a friend's bookstore. Neale spots a book by Forrester, The Psychoanalysis of Nazidom. Carla reveals that Forrester is one of her volunteers, as well as a consultant for the Ministry of Home Security. Neale is convinced that Carla's organization is a front for Nazi spies. Carla finds out that almost all the people Neale suspects are charity volunteers, all recommended by Forrester. She tells Willi about her discovery, and admits that she loves Neale.

That afternoon, Neale goes to Penteel's flat, only to find Mrs. Bellane. The two verbally spar. He flees when Penteel returns and begins screaming for the police.

Later, Carla tells Neale what she has learned. The bookseller asks the couple to deliver some books in a suitcase since they are leaving. They are nearly killed by the bomb inside.

Neale awakens in the hospital, the prisoner of Scotland Yard Inspector Prentice. Neale persuades Prentice to search the bombed-out cottage for evidence. Neale finds a microfilm of military secrets inside a piece of cake in a bird's nest. Officials insist that the documents have only been taken out of a safe twice, the second time when Forrester's tailor, Travers, was present. Neale recalls that the empty flat was leased in Travers' name.

Prentice and Neale go to the tailor's shop and find that Travers is Cost. Travers ostensibly calls a client about a suit; it is actually a coded message. Then, seeing he is trapped, he commits suicide. When Neale dials the number, Carla answers.

Neale slips away to confront Carla. Willi emerges, armed with a pistol, and admits he is the head of the spy ring. Another copy of the microfilm is sewn into the suit he received from Travers. Carla throws a candlestick, striking her brother's hand. The two men struggle, and Carla picks up the gun. When she refuses to hand it over to Willi, he tries to flee, but she shoots him dead. Forrester and other Nazi agents chase Neale and Carla. Prentice arrives and kills the remaining Nazis.

== Cast ==
- Ray Milland as Stephen Neale
- Marjorie Reynolds as Carla Hilfe
- Carl Esmond as Willi Hilfe/Mr. Macklin
- Hillary Brooke as Mrs Bellane #2
- Percy Waram as Inspector Prentice
- Dan Duryea as Cost/Travers
- Alan Napier as Dr Forrester
- Erskine Sanford as George Rennit
- Mary Field as Martha Penteel
- Aminta Dyne as Mrs Bellane #1
- Eustace Wyatt as blind man on train

== Comparison with the novel ==
Graham Greene's protagonist is tormented with guilt for having murdered his wife. He slipped poison into his wife's milk and left her to die alone. Despite the official finding of a mercy killing, he doubts he acted to end her suffering so much as to end his own. His sense of guilt pervades the novel. In the film, by contrast, he procures poison at his wife's request, but cannot administer it. She finds where he has hidden it and uses it to end her life. The legal results are the same as in the book, without the sense of personal culpability.

The film omits all of Rowe's incarceration in Dr Forester's private asylum with amnesia, after the bomb in the booby-trapped case of books explodes. Gradually he works out that the institution is run by Nazi agents and that inmates who find out too much are eliminated. Painful though it is to regain his memories, he realises that he must remember all he can and get out to inform the police.

His love interest, Anna Hilfe (Carla Hilfe in the film), appears in Fritz Lang's movie to be uninvolved in her brother's spy activities. In the novel, she does not shoot her brother dead, and there is no rooftop shootout with Nazi agents. Her brother Willi Hilfe, armed with a gun with a single bullet, commits suicide, in a railway station lavatory, when he cannot escape. Anna (Carla) must forever fear exposure as a spy, just as Rowe (Neale) fears exposure as a murderer. They go on together, lovers, but hardly the happy and carefree couple portrayed in the film: "They had to tread carefully for a lifetime, never speak without thinking twice ... They would never know what it was not to be afraid of being found out." That, not the spy pursuit of the film, is at the heart of Graham Greene's novel.

== Response ==
In a review at the time of release, Bosley Crowther of The New York Times wrote positively of Ministry of Fear, stating: "Mr. Lang has given the picture something of the chilling quality of some of his early German shockers—a strangely arch and maniacal surge that comes through suggestive use of camera and morbid pace in more critical spots. The clammy and numbing sensations of fear are thereby conveyed in a manner that is quite unusual for our generally overworked screen."

Dave Kehr of the Chicago Reader praised the film, writing: "This 1944 thriller represents an epochal meeting of two masters of Catholic guilt and paranoia, novelist Graham Greene and director Fritz Lang. Ray Milland, just released from a sanitorium, finds the outside world more than a fit match for his delusions as he stumbles into an elaborate Nazi plot. The hallucinatory quality of the opening scene (an innocent country fair turns out to be a nest of spies) is reminiscent of Lang's expressionist films of the 20s, but this is a more mature, more controlled film, Lang at his finest and purest."

Judd Blaise, writing for Allmovie, states: "While it does not reach the same level of timeless classic as Carol Reed's adaptation of Greene's The Third Man four years later, Ministry of Fear stands as a well-made, thoroughly gripping and intelligent example of film noir."
