= Richard Loo =

American actor (1903–1983)

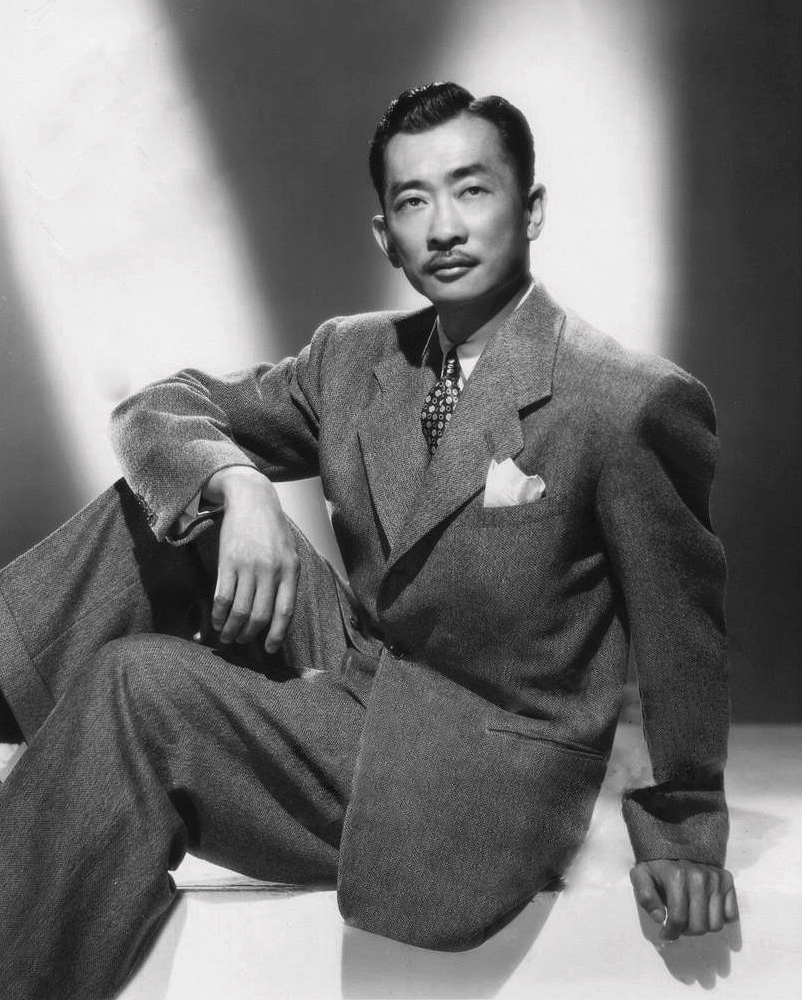
- Born: Richard Kuen Loo; October 1, 1903; Maui, Territory of Hawaii
- Died: November 20, 1983 (aged 80); Los Angeles, California, U.S.
- Resting place: San Fernando Mission Cemetery, Los Angeles, California
- Education: University of California at Berkeley
- Occupation: Actor
- Years active: 1931–1982
- Spouses: Bessie Loo (m. 1929; div. 1960) Hope Loo (m. 1964)

Signature
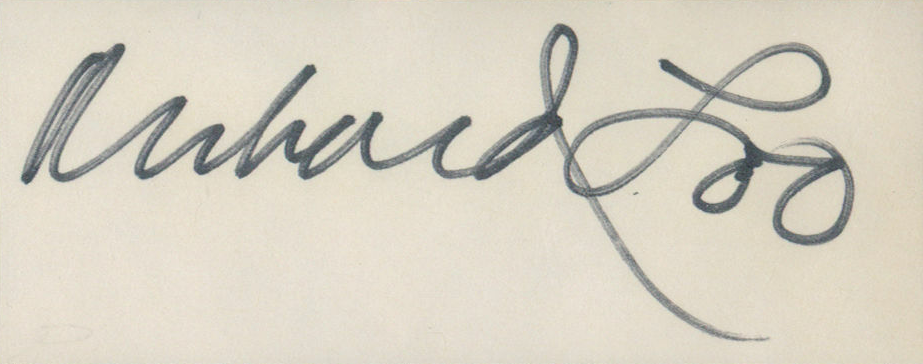

Richard Kuen Loo (October 1, 1903 – November 20, 1983) was an American actor. He was one of the most familiar Asian American character actors during the Golden Age of Hollywood, appearing in numerous films of the 1930s through the 1950s. Though of Chinese ancestry, he often portrayed villainous Imperial Japanese military officers during the Second World War. Later in his career, he was active mainly on television.

== Early life and education ==
Loo was born in Maui, Hawaii in 1903. He was a third-generation Chinese American, of Hakka ancestry. After spending his youth in Hawaii, he moved to California as a teenager. He studied business at the University of California at Berkeley, and upon graduating he opened a successful import-export company in the San Francisco Bay Area. However, the 1929 stock market crash and the subsequent Great Depression prematurely ended his business career.

Loo became involved in amateur theatre productions in San Francisco, and later took up drama classes at Pearl S. Buck’s East and West Association in Chinatown. After turning professional, he moved to Hollywood to appear at the Pasadena Playhouse, and made his film debut in 1931.

== Career ==
Like most East Asian actors in Hollywood, Loo typically played small, stereotypical roles, though he rose quickly to familiarity, if not fame, in a number of films. One of his earliest prominent roles was as a treacherous antagonist in the 1933 pre-Code film The Bitter Tea of General Yen, directed by Frank Capra, which was singled out by columnist Louella Parsons. However, the lack of strong roles for minority actors in Hollywood meant that he was largely relegated to minor parts (many uncredited) until the outbreak of World War II. He was considered an "atmosphere" player along with Spencer Chan and Willie Fung, and served on the Screen Actors Guild's Racial Committee.

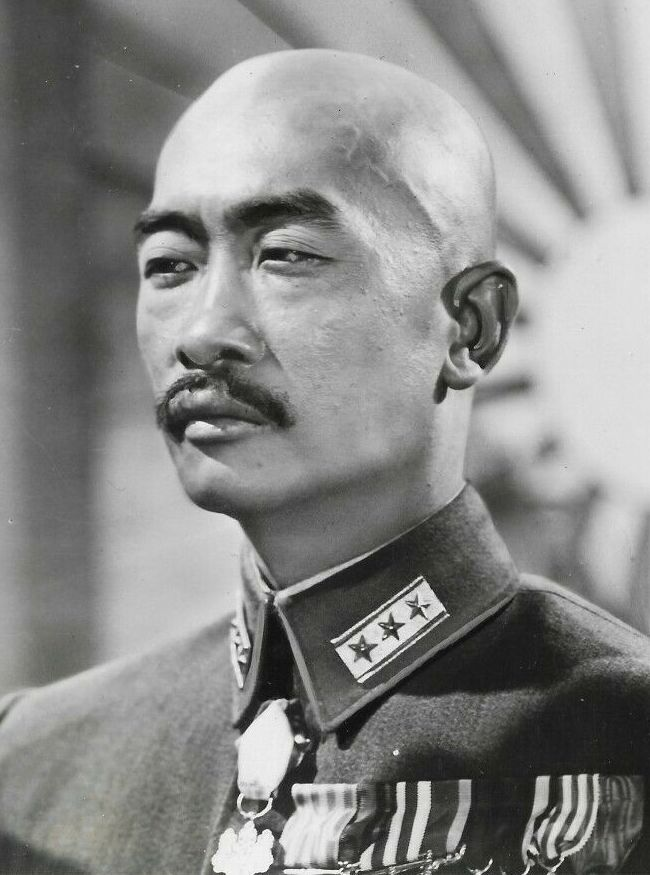
Loo in The Purple Heart (1944)

Loo’s stern features, sly grin, and sharp voice led him to be a favorite movie villain, and US entry into the war (along with the internment of any actual Japanese actors) gave him greater prominence in roles as vicious Japanese soldiers in such successful pictures as The Purple Heart (1944) and God Is My Co-Pilot (1945). In The Purple Heart, he plays a Japanese Imperial Army general who commits suicide because he cannot break down the American prisoners. According to his daughter, Beverly Jane Loo, the actor (who had been deferred from military service due to health issues) didn't mind being typecast as a villain in these movies as he felt very patriotic about playing those parts. In many of these films, he appeared alongside the Korean American actor and activist Philip Ahn.

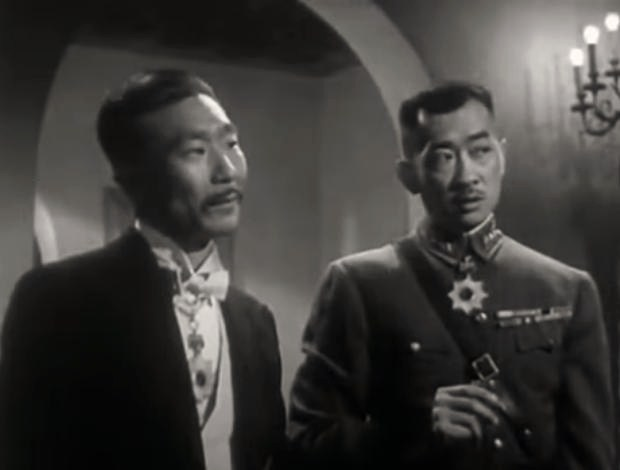
Loo and Philip Ahn in Women in the Night

Loo did also play more heroic characters. In 1944, he played a Chinese army lieutenant opposite Gregory Peck in The Keys of the Kingdom. In 1951, he played a war-weary Japanese-American soldier in Samuel Fuller's Korean War classic The Steel Helmet. However, he spent much of the latter part of his career performing stock roles in films and minor television roles. He also appeared in the hit Broadway plays South Pacific and The Teahouse of the August Moon.

In 1974, he played the supporting villain Hai Fat in the James Bond film The Man with the Golden Gun, opposite Roger Moore and Christopher Lee.

Loo was also a teacher of Shaolin monks in three episodes of the 1972–1975 hit TV series Kung Fu and made a further three appearances as a different character. His last acting appearance was in The Incredible Hulk TV series in 1981, but he continued to act in Toyota commercials into the following year.

== Personal life ==
Loo's first wife, Bessie Sue, was a well-known Hollywood agent. They had twin daughters Angela Marie Loo and Beverly Jane Loo. Beverly Loo was prominent in publishing, while Angela Loo Levy was a Hollywood agent and accomplished ski patroller. He later remarried to his second wife, Hope. He had a stepdaughter, Christel Hope Mintz.

=== Death ===
Loo died of a cerebral hemorrhage on November 20, 1983, aged 80. He was buried at San Fernando Mission Cemetery. His papers were posthumously donated to the American Heritage Center at the University of Wyoming.

== Filmography ==
=== Film ===
- War Correspondent (1932) as Bandit (uncredited)
- The Secrets of Wu Sin (1932) as Charlie San
- The Bitter Tea of General Yen (1933) as Capt. Li
- Now and Forever (1934) as Hotel clerk (uncredited)
- Student Tour (1934) as Geisha's customer (uncredited)
- The Painted Veil (1934) as Chinese peasant (uncredited)
- Limehouse Blues (1934) as Customer at Harry Young's (uncredited)
- The Mysterious Mr. Wong (1934) as Bystander outside store (uncredited)
- Stranded (1935) as Chinese groom (uncredited)
- Captured in Chinatown (1935) as Ling hatchet man (uncredited)
- Shadows of the Orient (1935) as Yung Yow - Chinese henchman (uncredited)
- China Seas (1935) as Chinese inspector at gangplank (uncredited)
- Roaming Lady (1936) as Chinese man (uncredited)
- Shadow of Chinatown (1936 serial) as Loo, Chinese man on street ( Chapters 5–7) (uncredited)
- Mad Holiday (1936) as Li Yat (uncredited)
- Stowaway (1936) as Chinese merchant (uncredited)
- After the Thin Man (1936) as Lichee Club headwaiter (uncredited)
- The Good Earth (1937) as Chinese farmer (uncredited)
- Lost Horizon (1937) as Shanghai airport official (uncredited)
- The Soldier and the Lady (1937) as Tartar (uncredited)
- The Singing Marine (1937) as Shanghai hotel official (uncredited)
- Outlaws of the Orient (1937) as General (uncredited)
- That Certain Woman (1937) as Elevator operator (uncredited)
- West of Shanghai (1937) as Mr. Cheng
- Thank You, Mr. Moto (1937) as Cop at shooting site (uncredited)
- Blondes at Work (1938) as Sam Wong (uncredited)
- Too Hot to Handle (1938) as Charlie (uncredited)
- Shadows Over Shanghai (1938) as Fong
- North of Shanghai (1939) as Jed's Pilot
- Panama Patrol (1939) as Tommy Young
- Mr. Wong in Chinatown (1939) as Tong chief
- Miracles for Sale (1939) as Chinese soldier in demo (uncredited)
- Lady of the Tropics (1939) as Delaroch's chauffeur (uncredited)
- Island of Lost Men (1939) as Gen. Ahn Ling
- Daughter of the Tong (1939) as Wong, hotel clerk
- Barricade (1939) as Colonel, commander of the rescue party (uncredited)
- The Fatal Hour (1940) as Jeweler
- Doomed to Die (1940) as Tong leader
- Ellery Queen's Penthouse Mystery (1941) as Henchman (uncredited)
- They Met in Bombay (1941) as Japanese officer (uncredited)
- Secrets of the Wasteland (1941) as Quan
- A Yank on the Burma Road (1942) as Commandant (uncredited)
- Star Spangled Rhythm (1942) as Emperor Hirohito (uncredited)
- Remember Pearl Harbor (1942) as Mandolin playing Japanese radioman (uncredited)
- Submarine Raider (1942) as Chauffeur Suji (uncredited)
- Bombs Over Burma (1942) as Col. Kim
- Little Tokyo, U.S.A. (1942) as Oshima
- Wake Island (1942) as Mr. Saburo Kurusu (uncredited)
- Across the Pacific (1942) as First Officer Miyuma
- Manila Calling (1942) as Filipino (uncredited)
- Flying Tigers (1942) as Dr. Tsing (uncredited)
- Road to Morocco (1942) as Chinese announcer (uncredited)
- City Without Men (1943) as Japanese spy (uncredited)
- Flight for Freedom (1943) as Mr. Yokahata (uncredited)
- The Amazing Mrs. Holliday (1943) as General Chan (uncredited)
- The Falcon Strikes Back (1943) as Jerry
- China (1943) as Lin Yun
- Yanks Ahoy (1943) as Japanese submarine officer (uncredited)
- Behind the Rising Sun (1943) as Japanese officer dispensing opium (uncredited)
- Destroyer (1943) as Japanese submarine commander (uncredited)
- So Proudly We Hail! (1943) as Japanese radio announcer (voice, uncredited)
- Jack London (1943) as Japanese Ambassador (uncredited)
- Rookies in Burma (1943) as Colonel Matsuda (uncredited)
- The Purple Heart (1944) as Gen. Ito Mitsubi
- The Story of Dr. Wassell (1944) as Chinese doctor on train (uncredited)
- The Keys of the Kingdom (1944) as Lt. Shon
- Betrayal from the East (1945) as Lt. Cmdr. Miyazaki, alias Tani
- God Is My Co-Pilot (1945) as Tokyo Joe
- China Sky (1945) as Col. Yasuda
- China's Little Devils (1945) as Colonel Huraji
- Back to Bataan (1945) as Maj. Hasko
- First Yank into Tokyo (1945) as Col. Hideko Okanura
- Prison Ship (1945) as Capt. Osikawa
- Tokyo Rose (1946) as Colonel Suzuki
- The Beginning or the End (1947) as Japanese officer (uncredited)
- Seven Were Saved (1947) as Colonel Yamura
- Web of Danger (1947) as Wing
- Beyond Our Own (1947, Short) as James Wong
- Women in the Night (1948) as Col. Noyama
- To the Ends of the Earth (1948) as Commissioner Lu (uncredited)
- Half Past Midnight (1948) as Lee Gow
- The Cobra Strikes (1948) as Hyder Ali
- The Golden Eye (1948) as Undetermined Secondary Role (scenes deleted)
- Rogues' Regiment (1948) as Kao Pang
- State Department: File 649 (1949) as Marshal Yun Usu
- The Clay Pigeon (1949) as Ken Tokoyama aka The Weasel
- Malaya (1949) as Colonel Genichi Tomura
- The Steel Helmet (1951) as Sgt. Tanaka
- Chinatown Chump (1951, Short) as Chinese counterfeiter
- Operation Pacific (1951) as Japanese fighter pilot (uncredited)
- I Was an American Spy (1951) as Col. Masamato
- 5 Fingers (1952) as Japanese Ambassador (uncredited)
- Target Hong Kong (1953) as Fu Chao
- Destination Gobi (1953) as Commanding Officer, Japanese POW camp (uncredited)
- China Venture (1953) as Chang Sung
- Hell and High Water (1954) as Hakada Fujimori
- The Shanghai Story (1954) as Junior officer
- Living It Up (1954) as Dr. Lee
- The Bamboo Prison (1954) as Commandant Hsai Tung
- Soldier of Fortune (1955) as General Po Lin
- House of Bamboo (1955) as Inspector Kita (dubbing Sessue Hayakawa, uncredited)
- Love is a Many-Splendored Thing (1955) as Robert Hung
- The Conqueror (1956) as Captain of Wang's guard
- Around the World in 80 Days (1956) as Hong Kong saloon manager (uncredited)
- Battle Hymn (1957) as Gen. Kim
- The Quiet American (1957) as Mr. Heng
- Hong Kong Affair (1958) as Li Noon
- The Scavengers (1959)
- Espionage: Far East (1961)
- Seven Women from Hell (1961) as Sgt. Takahashi
- Confessions of an Opium Eater (1962) as George Wah
- A Girl Named Tamiko (1962) as Otani
- Diamond Head (1962) as Yamagata (uncredited)
- The Sand Pebbles (1966) as Major Chin
- One More Time (1970) (uncredited)
- Which Way to the Front? (1970) as Japanese naval officer (uncredited)
- One More Train to Rob (1971) as Mr.Chang
- Chandler (1971) as Leo
- The Man with the Golden Gun (1974) as Hai Fat

=== Television ===
- Summer Theater 1 episode (Foo Young) (1953)
- Fireside Theater 2 episodes (I Cover Korea) (1953) (Major Chang in The Traitor) (1953)
- December Bride 1 episode (The Chinese Dinner) (1954) as Client
- My Little Margie 1 episode (San Francisco Story) (1954) as Mr. Tang
- Cavalcade of America 2 episodes (Ordeal in Burma) (1954) (Ho Chung in Diplomatic Outpost) (1956)
- TV Reader's Digest 2 episodes (Officer in The Brainwashing of John Hayes) (1955) (Lew Gar Mun in The Smuggler) (1956)
- Navy Log 1 episode (Dr. Van) (1956) as General Hashimoto
- Crossroads 1 episode (Calvary in China) (1956) as Colonel
- The Man Called X 1 episode (Assassination) (1956)
- Four Star Playhouse 1 episode (Wall of Bamboo) (1956) as Jo-Kai
- Tombstone Territory 1 episode (Tong War) (1958) as Quong Key, costarring with James Hong
- Hong Kong 2 episodes (Low in The Jade Empress) (1960) (Thug in Suitable for Framing) (1961)
- Maverick 1 episode (The Golden Fleecing) (1961) as Lee Hong Chang
- Follow the Sun 1 episode (The Woman Who Never Was) (1961) as District Attorney
- Bonanza 1 episode (Day of the Dragon) (1961) as General Mu Tsung
- The Beachcomber 1 episode (Charlie Six Kids) (1962) as Ah Wei
- Hawaiian Eye 1 episode (Two Too Many) (1963) as C.K. Yang
- The Dakotas 1 episode (The Chooser of the Slain) (1963) as George Yang
- The Outer Limits 1 episode (The Hundred Days of the Dragon) (1963) as Li-Chin Sung
- Wagon Train 1 episode (The Widow O'Rourke Story) (1963) as Liu Yang
- Perry Mason 1 episode (The Case of the Floating Stones) (1963) as Mr. Eng
- I Spy 1 episode (So Long, Patrick Henry) (1965) as Mr. Tsung
- Honey West 1 episode (The Owl and the Eye) (1965) as Tog-Chinese fine arts thief
- Voyage to the Bottom of the Sea 1 episode (Timebomb) (1965) as Li Tung
- Burke's Law 1 episode (Deadlier Than the Male) (1965) as Grass Slipper
- The Wackiest Ship in the Army 2 episodes (Admiral Osuma in The Lamb Who Hunted Wolves: Parts I & II) (1966)
- The Wild Wild West 1 episode (The Night the Dragon Screamed) (1966) as Wang Chung
- I Dream of Jeannie 1 episode (Jeannie and the Kidnap Caper) (1966) as Wong
- The Man from U.N.C.L.E. 1 episode (The Indian Affairs Affair) (1966) as Dr. Yahama
- Family Affair 1 episode (The Mother Tongue) (1967) as Mr. Chen
- My Three Sons 1 episode (Weekend in Paradise) (1967) as Mr. Chang
- Hawaii Five-O 1 episode (Twenty-Four Karat Kill) (1968) as Wong Tou
- It Takes a Thief 3 episodes (Clown in A Case of Red Turnips) (1968) (Dr. Langpoor in Payoff in the Piazza) (1969) (Wong in Project X) (1970)
- Marcus Welby, M.D. 1 episode (A Matter of Humanities) (1969) as Kenji Yamashita
- Here Comes the Brides 1 episode (Marriage, Chinese Style) (1969) as Chi Pei
- Bewitched 1 episode (Samantha's Better Halves) (1970) as Mr. Tanaka
- The Sixth Sense 1 episode (With This Ring, I Thee Kill) (1972) as Matsuo
- The Delphi Bureau 1 episode (The Deadly Little Errand) (1972) as Shen Si
- Kung Fu 6 episodes (Master Sun in Pilot (1972) Blood Brother (1973) Besieged: Cannon at the Gates (1974)) (Chen in The Tong) (1973) (Wu Chang in Arrogant Dragon) (1974) (Ho Fai, the weapons master in The Devil's Champion) (1974)
- Ironside 1 episode (In the Forests of the Night) (1973) as Lin Chu Tai
- McCloud 1 episode (The Solid Gold Swingers) (1973) as Y.S. Chen (uncredited)
- Owen Marshall: Counselor at Law 1 episode (The Attacker) (1974) as Tanaka
- Collision Course: Truman vs. MacArthur TV movie (1976) as Chiang-Kai-Shek
- The Quest 1 episode (Welcome to America, Jade Snow) (1976) as Dr. Li Po
- Police Story 1 episode (The Blue Fog) (1977) as Eddie Lee
- The Hardy Boys/Nancy Drew Mysteries 1 episode (The Secret of the Jade Kwan Yin) (1977) as Chen Lee
- The Incredible Hulk 1 episode (East Winds) (1981) as Kam Chong (final appearance)

Note: Loo twice appeared as a talk-show guest—with Johnny Carson in 1969 and Dick Cavett in 1971. The latter, who loved to do an impression of Loo specifically, asked him about his career, including being of Chinese ancestry yet playing Japanese soldiers in WWII films (Loo said he didn't mind; work was work) and the different ways Chinese and Japanese spoke English.
