= Lisa Howard (news personality) =

American actress and network television news reporter/anchor

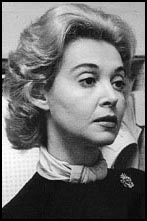
- Howard c. 1950s
- Born: Dorothy Jean Guggenheim; April 24, 1926; Cambridge, Ohio, U.S.
- Died: July 4, 1965 (aged 39); East Hampton, Long Island, New York, U.S.
- Education: Miami University
- Occupations: Journalist, actress
- Years active: 17
- Spouse(s): Felix E. Feist (divorced); Walter Lowendahl
- Children: 2

Lisa Howard (née Dorothy Jean Guggenheim, April 24, 1926 – July 4, 1965) was an American journalist, writer, and television news anchor who previously had a career as an off-Broadway and soap opera actress. In the early 1960s, she became ABC News's first woman reporter, and was the first woman to have her own national network television news show. Howard developed a relationship with Cuba's Fidel Castro, whom she met to interview, and was a go-between for a time between Castro and the American White House. Her network career ended when she became openly involved in the 1964 United States Senate election in New York. In 1965, Howard suffered a miscarriage and depression, dying of an overdose of painkillers.

== Early years and acting career ==
Howard was born in Cambridge, Ohio. Her family was Jewish. She attended Miami University for a year before dropping out to pursue an acting career. At the age of 18, Howard moved to Los Angeles and joined the Pasadena Playhouse. From there she pursued a film and television career. In 1953, the entertainment magazine People Today featured her on its front page, calling her "TV's First Lady of Sin". She also played roles on the 1950s Saturday morning science fiction show Space Patrol, The Edge of Night, As the World Turns and Guiding Light for CBS Television in the 1950s. After moving to New York City, Howard starred in the off-Broadway show, 'Tis Pity She's a Whore.

== Journalism career ==
In the late 1950s, Howard decided to make a major career change. She began working as a stringer for the Mutual Radio Network. She covered the 1960 Democratic National Convention and became the first American reporter to interview Soviet Premier Nikita Khrushchev. Due to the widespread attention generated by that interview, in 1961 she was hired by ABC News as their first female correspondent to cover the Vienna summit between Khrushchev and John F. Kennedy. She also served as the editor for the political journal War/Peace Report, and wrote a novel On Stage, Miss Douglas, released in 1960.

In 1963, ABC promoted her to be the first female anchor of a news broadcast geared toward housewives called Lisa Howard and News with the Woman's Touch. As part of the broadcast, she interviewed famous and influential world personalities, among them the Shah of Iran, Eleanor Roosevelt, Barry Goldwater, and Nelson Rockefeller. In April 1963, she traveled to Cuba to make an ABC special on Cuban leader Fidel Castro. During his filmed interview, as well as in private conversation with Howard, Castro made it clear that Cuba was interested in improved relations with Washington. On her return to the U.S., she was debriefed by CIA deputy director, Richard Helms. In a secret memorandum of conversation sent to President Kennedy, Helms reported: "Lisa Howard definitely wants to impress the U.S. Government with two facts: Castro is ready to discuss rapprochement and she herself is ready to discuss it with him if asked to do so by the U.S. Government." Subsequently, Howard used her Upper East Side apartment for the first meeting between a U.S. and Cuban diplomat, and for phone communications between Castro and the Kennedy administration.

According to her daughter, Fritzi, Howard became involved with Castro and viewed herself as a grand player on the stage of history. In an article for Politico detailing their relationship, Peter Kornbluh describes Howard's role as a liaison between the United States and Cuba as "intimate diplomacy", explaining that "her role as peacemaker was built on a complex, little-understood rapport she managed to forge with Castro himself – a relationship that was political and personal, intellectual and intimate," including a romantic and sexual relationship consummated during a visit in February 1964. In order to continue the reconciliation agenda, she set up a meeting between UN diplomat William Attwood and Cuba's UN representative Carlos Lechuga on September 23, 1963, at her Upper East Side New York apartment, under the cover of a cocktail party. With Howard's support, the Kennedy White House was organizing a secret meeting with an emissary of Fidel Castro in November 1963 at the United Nations—a plan that was aborted when President Kennedy was assassinated in Dallas on November 22, 1963. The new president, Lyndon B. Johnson, objected to normalizing relations with Cuba as he feared this would make him appear soft on Communism. Howard continued to work toward better relations, returning to Cuba to do another ABC special with Castro in February 1964 and becoming a go-between for communications between Washington and Havana. When Argentine Marxist revolutionary Ernesto "Che" Guevara came to New York in December 1964, she hosted a cocktail party for him and arranged a meeting between Guevara and U.S. Senator Eugene McCarthy.

In September 1964, Howard helped form a political organization called "Democrats for Keating"—a group of liberal Democrats that included Gore Vidal, who opposed Robert F. Kennedy's bid to become a U.S. senator representing the state of New York. ABC News warned her that her public partisan politics would lead to her dismissal. Howard nevertheless continued to work openly in support of Kennedy's Republican opponent, Kenneth Keating. In the fall of 1964, ABC fired Howard and named Marlene Sanders as the new anchor of News with the Woman's Touch, which would last until 1968.

== Personal life ==
Howard was married twice and had two children. Her first marriage was to film director Felix E. Feist, with whom she had a daughter, Fritzi. The couple later divorced. Howard later married producer Walter Lowendahl, with whom she had a daughter, Anne.

== Death ==
Allegedly devastated by the loss of her career, Howard suffered a miscarriage in June 1965 and was hospitalized with depression. On July 4, 1965, while on an Independence Day vacation in the Hamptons with her family, she took a fatal overdose of barbiturates. Her death was ruled a suicide.

Ex-husband Feist died 2 months later at age 55.

== In popular culture ==
Julia Ormond portrayed Howard in the Steven Soderbergh film Che (2008).

== Partial filmography ==
- Guilty of Treason (1950) – Soviet Official at School
- The Man Who Cheated Himself (1950) – Janet Cullen
- Donovan's Brain (1953) – Chloe Donovan
- Sabaka (1954) – Indria
- Mobs, Inc. (1956) – Ronnie Miles

== Sources ==
- Lisa Howard page at Spartacus Educational
- Talbot, David (2007). Brothers: The Hidden History of the Kennedy Years. New York: Free Press. pp. 224–232.
