= Bessie Loo =

American actress and talent agent

Bessie Sue Loo
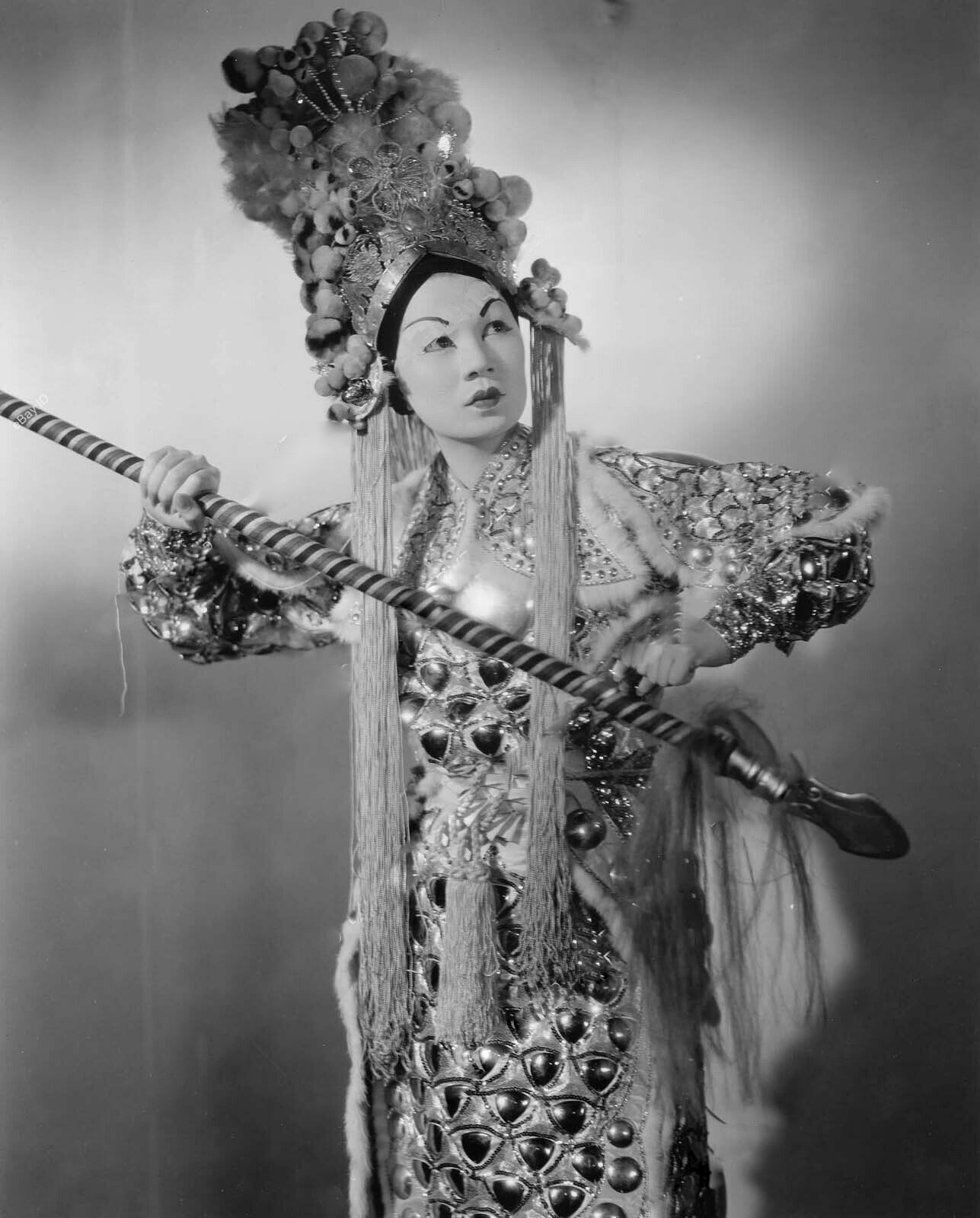
- Loo in a publicity photo for The Good Earth (1937)
- Born: Bessie Sue; December 30, 1902; Hanford, California
- Died: October 28, 1998 (aged 95)
- Occupations: actress, agent
- Known for: Bessie Loo Talent Agency
- Spouse(s): Richard Loo (1929–1960 divorce)

Bessie Loo (December 30, 1902 – October 28, 1998) was an American actress, casting director, and talent agent. She owned the Bessie Loo Talent Agency for over 40 years, and represented many of the Asian-American actors in 20th-century Hollywood.

== Early life ==
Loo was born as Bessie Sue in Hanford, California. Loo's father, Sue Chung Kee, immigrated to Hanford from China in 1886, and operated a general store there; Loo's mother was born in San Francisco. The Sue family lived above their store.

== Education ==
Loo attended the University of California at Los Angeles, and graduated from San Francisco Teachers College in 1928.

== Career ==
As an actress of Chinese descent, Loo's acting career started in 1930s. Loo mostly played small parts. Loo appeared in The Good Earth (1937), and was a maid in Mr. Wong in Chinatown (1939); her husband Richard Loo was also in the cast of both films. She began working with Central Casting during the making of The Good Earth, when her language skills proved useful with the many Chinese-speaking extras.

During the opening of World War II, Loo started The Bessie Loo Talent Agency, with offices on Sunset Boulevard in Los Angeles, California. Loo represented Asian-American actors in the film industry, including Jack Ong, Keye Luke, Robert Ito, Beulah Quo, James Hong, Soon-Tek Oh, Mako Iwamatsu, Joan Chen, Lisa Lu, and Guy Lee (who eventually took over the agency when Bessie Loo retired). All the founding members of the East West Players were represented by Bessie Loo.

Bessie Loo served as president of the China Society of Southern California, and of the Los Angeles Chinese Women's Club. She was also an appointed member of the California State Economic Development Commission, and a member of the Academy of Motion Picture Arts and Sciences.

In 1978 her achievements were honored at a dinner of the Chinese Historical Society of Southern California, and in 1982 her friend and client James Hong organized an event with the Association of Asian Pacific American Artists (AAPAA) called "An Affair with Bessie," to celebrate her career. Just weeks before she died, she was honored for "Excellence in Entertainment" by the Chinese American Museum of Los Angeles, at their annual Historymakers Awards Banquet.

== Personal life ==
In 1929, Loo married actor Richard Loo. They had twin daughters, Beverly and Angela, born in 1931.

In 1998, Loo died. She was 95 years old. Archival footage of Loo, and a brief discussion of her work, was featured in the Arthur Dong documentary Hollywood Chinese (2007).
