= Charles F. Miller =

American actor (1878–1952)

Charles Fish Miller
- Born: June 21, 1878; Saginaw, Michigan, United States
- Died: November 25, 1952; West Hollywood, California, United States
- Occupation: Actor
- Years active: 1933-49

Charles F. Miller (June 6, 1878 – November 25, 1952) was an American film actor. Miller made his film debut in Little Women as a minister and starred in many films thereafter.

One of his first biggest roles was starring alongside Keye Luke in Phantom of Chinatown.

He was also one of the founding members of the Screen Actors Guild.

== Death ==
Miller died in Hollywood.

== Selected filmography ==
- Little Women (1933) - Minister (uncredited)
- The Man They Could Not Hang (1939) - Dr. Avery - Juror (uncredited)
- Tower of London (1939) - Councilman (uncredited)
- The Night of Nights (1939) - Wilton (uncredited)
- Terry and the Pirates (1940) - Planter (uncredited)
- The Man with Nine Lives (1940) - Doctor Spectator Explaining Procedure (uncredited)
- The Secret Seven (1940) - Prison Doctor (uncredited)
- I'm Still Alive (1940) - 4th Doctor (uncredited)
- Phantom of Chinatown (1940) - Dr. John Benton / Cyrus Benton in Newspaper
- The Green Hornet Strikes Again! (1940) - George K. Otterson
- Kitty Foyle (1940) - Doctor (uncredited)
- Caught In The Act (1941) - Leonard Brandon
- Meet the Chump (1941) - George Washington (uncredited)
- The Spider Returns (1941) - Mr. Van Sloan
- Double Cross (1941) - Mayor John Frawley
- Gambling Daughters (1941) - Walter Cameron
- The Stork Pays Off (1941) - Mr. Vance (uncredited)
- Swamp Water (1941) - Fiskus (uncredited)
- Dick Tracy vs. Crime, Inc. (1941) - Cmdr. Haees (uncredited)
- Lady for a Night (1942) - Father (uncredited)
- South of Santa Fe (1942) - John McMahon
- Raiders of the Range (1942) - John Travers
- They All Kissed the Bride (1942) - Department Head (uncredited)
- The Phantom Plainsmen (1942) - Cap Marvin
- Joan of Ozark (1942) - Mr. Graham (uncredited)
- Highways by Night (1942) - Magician (uncredited)
- Junior Army (1942) - Captain McDermott (uncredited)
- Thundering Trails (1943) - Captain Sam Brooke
- The Blocked Trail (1943) - Frank Nolan
- Daredevils of the West (1943) - Foster [Ch. 1]
- Days of Old Cheyenne (1943) - John Carlyle
- Black Hills Express (1943) - Raymond Harper
- Beyond the Last Frontier (1943) - Major Cook
- Wagon Tracks West (1943) - Brown Bear
- Headin' for God's Country (1943) - John Lane (uncredited)
- Gildersleeve on Broadway (1943) - The Judge (uncredited)
- Jack London (1943) - William Loeb (uncredited)
- Raiders of Sunset Pass (1943) - Dad Mathews
- Pride of the Plains (1944) - Grant Bradford
- Beneath Western Skies (1944) - Lem Toller
- Hidden Valley Outlaws (1944) - Daniel Clark
- Raiders of Ghost City (1944) - Sec, Stanton (uncredited)
- Wilson (1944) - Senator Bromfield
- Oh, What a Night (1944) - Sutton
- House of Frankenstein (1944) - Burgomaster Toberman
- Honeymoon Ahead (1945) - Ephraim
- The Caribbean Mystery (1945) - Dr. Otis Larrabee (uncredited)
- Secret Agent X-9 (1945) - Blanchard (uncredited)
- River Gang (1945) - Doctor (uncredited)
- The Daltons Ride Again (1945) - A.J. Haines (uncredited)
- Rendezvous 24 (1946) - Dr. Upton (uncredited)
- Night and Day (1946) - Professor (uncredited)
- Rustler's Round-up (1946) - Judge Wayne
- Gunman's Code (1946) - Sam Burton
- I'll Be Yours (1947) - Businessman (uncredited)
- Pursued (1947) - Coachman (uncredited)
- That's My Gal (1947) - Mr. Newcomb (uncredited)
- That's My Man (1947) - (uncredited)
- Roses Are Red (1947) - Judge Patterson (uncredited)
- The Judge Steps Out (1948) - Superior Court Judge (uncredited)
- Call Northside 777 (1948) - Parole Board Member (uncredited)
- The Miracle of the Bells (1948) - Priest in 'Joan of Arc' (uncredited)
- Homecoming (1948) - Doctor (uncredited)
- Fighting Father Dunne (1948) - Judge (uncredited)
- Up in Central Park (1948) - Jones (uncredited)
- Mexican Hayride (1948) - Mr. Lewis (uncredited)
- The Life of Riley (1949) - Minor Role (uncredited) (final film role)
