= Mobs, Inc. =

1956 film by William Asher

- Film poster
- Directed by: William Asher
- Starring: Reed Hadley
- Release date: March 21, 1956
- Running time: 62 min.
- Country: United States
- Language: English

Mobs, Inc. is a 1956 film directed by William Asher. It stars Reed Hadley and Lisa Howard. It was composed of three episodes from the American television series Racket Squad.

== Plot ==
Captain John Braddock schools a group of police recruits with three stories of dangerous con artist stories.

== Cast ==
- Reed Hadley as Capt. John Braddock
- Lisa Howard as Ronnie Miles
- Marjorie Reynolds as Mary Hale Browne
- Douglass Dumbrille as Leland Cameron James

== See also ==
- List of American films of 1956
