= Racketeers of the Range =

1939 film by D. Ross Lederman

- Directed by: D. Ross Lederman; Melville Shyer
- Screenplay by: Oliver Drake
- Story by: Bernard McConville
- Produced by: Bert Gilroy
- Starring: George O'Brien; Chill Wills; Marjorie Reynolds
- Cinematography: Harry Wild
- Edited by: Frederic Knudtson
- Music by: Roy Webb
- Production company: RKO Radio Pictures
- Release date: May 26, 1939
- Running time: 62 minutes
- Country: United States
- Language: English

Racketeers of the Range is a 1939 American Western film directed by D. Ross Lederman from a screenplay by Oliver Drake, based on Bernard McConville's story. Produced and distributed by RKO Radio Pictures, the film was released on May 26, 1939. and stars George O'Brien, Chill Wills, and Marjorie Reynolds.

== Plot ==
Helen Lewis has inherited her father's small, independent meat packing plant; however, her attorney, Roger Whitlock, plans to sell her out to a large packing company. Barney O'Dell, the area's largest cattle ranch owner, knows if Helen is forced to sell her business, the larger company will have a monopoly and the cattle ranchers won't be able to freely market their beef. As chief creditor, Barney takes control of Helen's plant and all the local ranchers combine their livestock for Barney to ship. However, Whitlock and his gang rustle the herd. Barney and his cowhands intervene and retrieve the cattle, now piled into cattle trucks. After the cattle are transferred onto a train for shipment, Whitlock and his gang steal the train. Barney gives pursuit, boards the train, throws the rustlers off one by one during a gunfight, and subdues Whitlock who is holding Helen in the caboose. Barney frees Helen and the two sit together on the back of the caboose landing.

== Cast ==
- George O'Brien as Barney O'Dell
- Chill Wills as Whopper Hatch
- Marjorie Reynolds as Helen Lewis
- Gay Seabrook as Penny Jones
- Robert Fiske as Roger Whitlock
- John Dilson as William J. Benson
- Monte Montague as Joe Larkin
- Bud Osborne as Hank
- Ben Corbett as Dutch
- Ray Whitley as Ray Whitley
- Cactus Mack as Flash Gilbert
- Frankie Marvin as Skeeter Potts
