= Up in Mabel's Room (play) =

Play by Wilson Collison and Otto Hauerbach

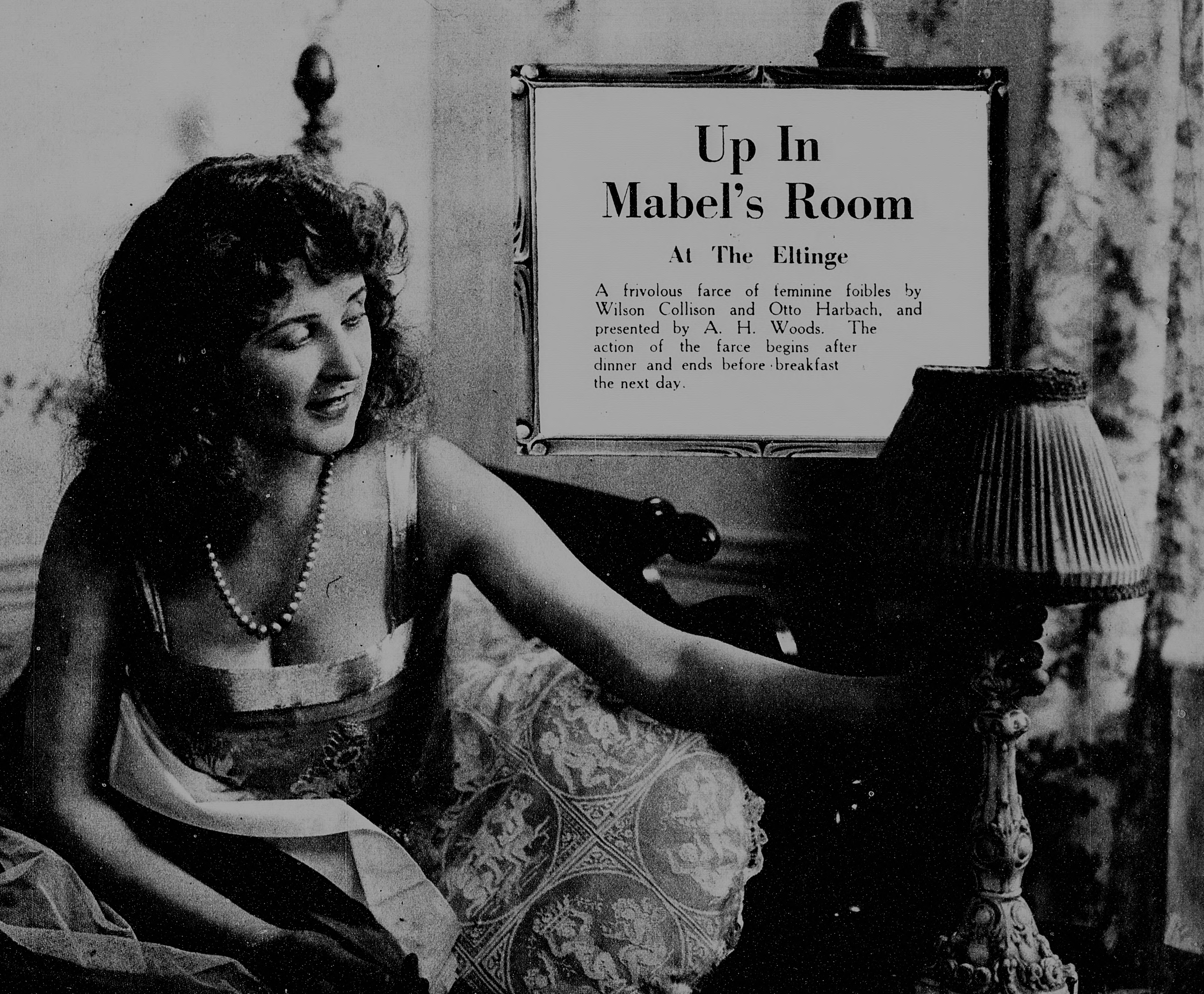
- Hazel Dawn as Mabel
- Original language: English
- Written by: Wilson Collison and Otto Hauerbach
- Genre: Farce

Premiere
- Date: January 15, 1919
- Place: Eltinge 42nd Street Theatre

Up in Mabel's Room is a play written by Wilson Collison and Otto Hauerbach. Producer Albert H. Woods staged it on Broadway in 1919.

== Plot ==
Garry Ainsworth is married to Geraldine, who is jealous of his previous relationship with a pretty young widow, Mabel Essington. When they were together, Garry gave Mabel a chemise with their names embroidered on it. He wants to recover the garment before Geraldine learns of its existence. Garry's efforts are interpreted by other characters as evidence of a tryst between him and Mabel, leading to a confrontation between Mabel and Geraldine before the misunderstanding is resolved.

== Cast and characters ==
The characters and cast from the Broadway production are given below:

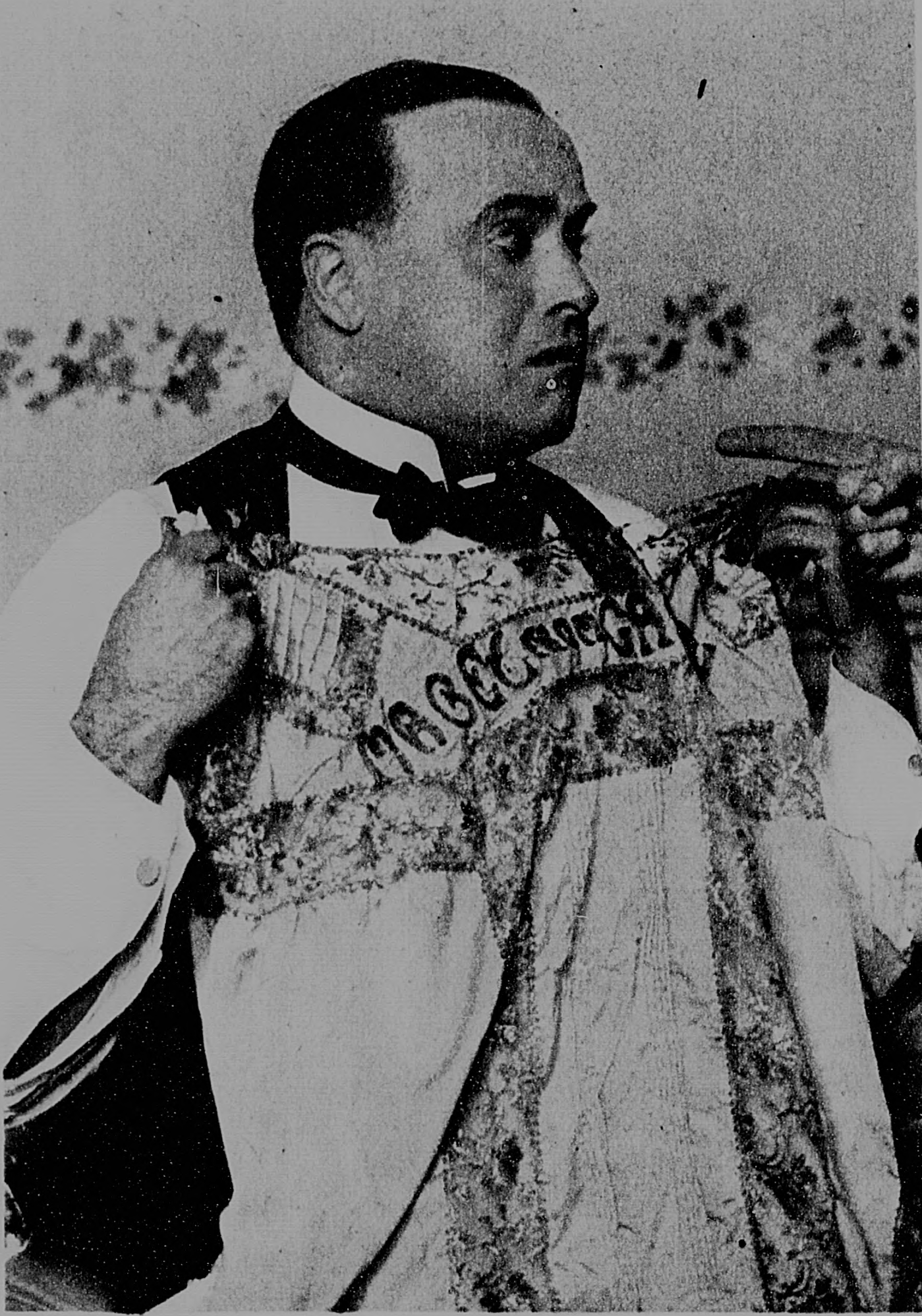
John Cumberland played Garry in the Broadway production.

Cast of the Broadway production
Character	Broadway cast
Kruger	Frederick Sutton
Corliss	Harry C. Bradley
Jimmy Larchmont	Walter Jones
Garry Ainsworth	John Cumberland
Geraldine	Enid Markey
Mabel Essington	Hazel Dawn
Martha Weldon	Lucy Cotton
Alicia Larchmont	Evelyn Gosnell
Arthur Weldon	H. Dudley Hawley
Marie	Adele Rolland

== History ==
The play opened at the Eltinge 42nd Street Theatre on January 15, 1919. It closed in August 1919 after 229 performances.

== Adaptations ==
The play was adapted twice as a movie. A 1926 silent film adaptation starred Marie Prevost as Mabel. A 1944 film adaptation starred Marjorie Reynolds.
