= The Ministry of Fear =

1943 novel by Graham Greene

- First edition
- Author: Graham Greene
- Language: English
- Publication date: 1943

The Ministry of Fear is a 1943 novel written by Graham Greene. It was first published in Britain by William Heinemann. It was made into the 1944 film Ministry of Fear, directed by Fritz Lang and starring Ray Milland.

The title is explained in the book. The Nazi regime, in countries it controlled and in those it intended to subvert, built up information on individuals in order to blackmail them into co-operation. This Greene called their ministry of fear.

== Plot summary ==
In London during the Blitz, Arthur Rowe attends a charity fête. Convicted of murder for the mercy killing of his wife, he has just been released from a psychiatric prison. A fortune-teller tells him the answer to the "guess the weight of the cake" competition, enabling Rowe to win it. As he leaves, the organisers try to take the cake back, saying there's been a mistake, but Rowe refuses.

The next day, a man offers Rowe money for the cake and then tries to poison him, but an air raid bomb demolishes the house, knocking them both out. Worried for himself and wary of the police, Rowe hires a private detective to watch him and goes to the charity that ran the fête. There he meets Willi and Anna Hilfe, Austrian refugees who are brother and sister. Willi goes with Rowe to the fortune-teller's home. There they join in a séance, during which a man is murdered with Rowe's knife. Rowe escapes before the police arrive.

Rowe contemplates suicide, but meets a man who asks him to take a case containing some books to a hotel. At the hotel he finds Anna, and a bomb in the case explodes. When Rowe regains consciousness, he has amnesia. The nurses tell him his name is Richard Digby, but Anna visits and calls him "Arthur". Rowe starts to fall in love with Anna.

Becoming convinced that the sanatorium is run by Nazi agents, Rowe escapes and goes to the police. The police tell him that the man who Rowe thought murdered is not dead, and the cake had a microfilm of secret plans hidden in it. They take him to a tailor's shop where he identifies the man he thought dead. Before they can question the man, he kills himself.

After the police round up most of the spy ring, Rowe rings the telephone number that the tailor called before killing himself, and hears Anna's voice. He finds out the address and, going there, learns that Willi is a member of the spy ring.

Willi escapes, intending to reach neutral Ireland with the microfilm sewn into his new suit, but when cornered by Rowe commits suicide. Rowe returns to Anna.

== Comparison with the film ==
Graham Greene's protagonist, Arthur Rowe (Stephen Neale in the film), is profoundly tormented with guilt for his having murdered his wife. In the film, that is a simple mercy killing, an assisted suicide. In the book, Rowe slips the poison into his wife's milk – "how queer it tastes", she says – and leaves her to die alone. Despite the official finding of a mercy killing, he believes "that somewhere there was justice, and justice condemned him." He knows that the deed was not so much to end her suffering, as to end his own. This overwhelming sense of guilt, pervading the novel from beginning to end, is absent from the film.

The film omits all of Rowe's incarceration in Dr Forester's private asylum with amnesia, after the bomb in the booby-trapped case of books explodes. Gradually he works out that the institution is run by Nazi agents and that inmates who find out too much are eliminated. Painful though it is to regain his memories, he realises that he must remember all he can and get out to inform the police.

His love interest, Anna Hilfe (Carla Hilfe in the film), appears in Fritz Lang's movie to be uninvolved in her brother's spy activities. In the novel, she does not shoot her brother dead, and there is no rooftop shootout with Nazi agents. Her brother Willi Hilfe, armed with a gun with a single bullet, commits suicide, in a railway station lavatory, when he cannot escape. Anna (Carla) must forever fear exposure as a spy, just as Rowe (Neale) fears exposure as a murderer. They go on together, lovers, but hardly the happy and carefree couple portrayed in the film: "They had to tread carefully for a lifetime, never speak without thinking twice ... They would never know what it was not to be afraid of being found out." That, not the spy pursuit of the film, is at the heart of Graham Greene's novel.
