= Phantom of Chinatown =

- Original film poster
- Directed by: Phil Rosen
- Written by: Hugh Wiley, Ralph Gilbert Bettison
- Produced by: Paul Malvern
- Starring: Keye Luke
- Cinematography: Fred Jackman Jr.
- Edited by: Jack Ogilvie
- Music by: Edward J. Kay
- Distributed by: Monogram Pictures Corporation
- Release date: November 18, 1940
- Running time: 62 minutes
- Country: United States
- Language: English

Phantom of Chinatown is a 1940 American mystery film directed by Phil Rosen starring Keye Luke. This is the last of the Mr. Wong films and the only one to star Luke in the role originated by Boris Karloff. This was the first film with a Chinese actor playing the lead role as a Chinese detective.

== Plot ==
After participating in an extensive archaeological expedition in the Mongolian desert, Dr. John Benton is in San Francisco to hold a presentation of the findings to his colleagues. The film material shows how the archaeological team discovered the long sought ancient tomb of an Emperor of the Ming dynasty.

In the tomb, the team found a scroll, telling of a secret Temple of Eternal Fire. The temple is believed to be hiding a previously unknown oil reserve, and would be of great financial importance to the Chinese people were it to be discovered.

During the expedition, when the tomb was opened, a forceful hurricane took the life of Mason, the co-pilot. The storm was predicted by an ancient curse guarding the tomb. Unfortunately, as Benton is about to reveal the contents of the scroll during the presentation, he starts choking and ultimately dies from suffocation.

After the presentation, it turns out that the scroll is missing from Benton's safe in his office, and his secretary, Win Len, claims she has no knowledge of its whereabouts. One of Benton's students, James Lee Wong, does his own investigation into the death of his professor, and finds out that Benton must have been poisoned with what another man, Street, identifies as an oriental vegetable poison. James finds a pitcher and a glass cup containing traces of this poison. Another member of the expedition team, camera man Charles Fraser, is attacked in his home, and is found injured by James and Street. They also find Win Len tied up and gagged at the house, having been attacked after entering the house. They are both unaware that Mason faked his own death at the tomb, and that he and Benton's butler, Jonas, are planning to lay their hands on all artifacts found in the tomb.

Street manages to trace Fraser's attacker to a hideout near the waterfront, where both Mason and Jonas are hiding. Mason escapes through a secret door, but James and Street find an artifact identifiable from the tomb. They also find Jonas' dead body in a coffin, and it turns out he has been poisoned, then stabbed.

The two amateur sleuths manage to get an article published in the paper, saying Mason is sick with yellow fever in a hospital, to lure the killer there. James wears a wire and impersonates Mason at the hospital. Mason himself turns up at the hospital, and also Fraser. James and Mason fight each other, but Street and the police interrupt them.

It turns out Fraser has worked together with Mason, but tried to double-cross him and break into Benton's safe to steal the scroll. Fraser also killed Benton to keep the secret of the oil reserve to himself. He later killed Jonas.

The original scroll has now been destroyed by Fraser, but there is still a photo of it left. After Fraser is arrested, the photo is given to the Chinese government so that they can try to find the oil reserve.

== Cast ==
- Keye Luke as James Lee Wong
- Grant Withers as Police Captain Street
- Lotus Long as Win Len
- Charles F. Miller as Dr. Benton
- Huntley Gordon as Dr. Norman Wilkes
- Virginia Carpenter as Louise Benton
- John Dilson as Charles Fraser
- Paul McVey as Detective Grady
- Willy Castello as Jonas
