= Six Shootin' Sheriff =

1938 film

- Directed by: Harry L. Fraser
- Written by: Harry L. Fraser
- Produced by: Arthur Alexander; Max Alexander
- Starring: Ken Maynard; Marjorie Reynolds; Lafe McKee
- Cinematography: William Hyer
- Edited by: Charles Henkel Jr.
- Production company: Colony Pictures
- Distributed by: Grand National Pictures
- Release date: May 20, 1938
- Running time: 59 minutes
- Country: United States
- Language: English

Six Shootin' Sheriff is a 1938 American Western film directed and written by Harry L. Fraser, and starring Ken Maynard and Marjorie Reynolds.

== Plot ==
Jim "Trigger" Norton seeks revenge for those who wrongfully accused him and locked away for a crime he didn't commit.

== Cast ==
- Ken Maynard as Jim 'Trigger' Morton
- Marjorie Reynolds as Molly Morgan
- Lafe McKee as Zeke
- Walter Long as Gang Leader Chuck
- Bob Terry as Ed Morton
- Harry Harvey as Todd
- Tom London as Bar X Foreman
- Richard Alexander as Bar X Rider Big Boy
- Warner Richmond as Ace Kendal
- Ben Corbett as Henchman Red
- Earl Dwire as Wild Bill Holman
- Roger Williams as Henchman Bart
