= Mr. Wong in Chinatown =

1939 film

- Film poster
- Directed by: William Nigh
- Written by: Hugh Wiley; Scott Darling
- Produced by: William T. Lackey
- Starring: Boris Karloff; Marjorie Reynolds
- Cinematography: Harry Neumann
- Edited by: Russell F. Schoengarth
- Music by: Edward J. Kay
- Distributed by: Monogram Pictures
- Release date: August 1, 1939
- Running time: 71 minutes
- Country: United States
- Language: English

Mr. Wong in Chinatown is a 1939 American mystery film directed by William Nigh and starring Boris Karloff as Mr. Wong.

The film is the third in the series of Mr. Wong.

== Plot ==
A beautiful Chinese woman visits Mr. Wong late at night but is murdered before she can tell him why she needs his help. Wong discovers that she is Princess Lin Hwa, the sister of a powerful Chinese general, and that she was killed with a poisoned dart fired from a Chinese "sleeve gun."

As with some of his previous investigations, Wong is given important information by the leader of a powerful tong (Chinese secret society). The tong leader tells Wong that the princess had come to the United States with almost $1-million to arrange the secret purchase of airplanes that were to be smuggled into China.

As Wong continues the investigation he learns that all the money that the princess deposited in a local bank has been paid out—and that the signature on most of the checks is a forgery. Wong becomes the target of a killer, and is aided in his investigation by a blonde, beautiful and energetic newspaper reporter.

Was the princess killed by enemies of her brother to prevent the shipment of the planes to China? Or was she killed to hide the fact that there actually were no planes and the whole scheme was a scam?

Wong's careful conversations with the captain of the ship the princess traveled on, the owner of the aviation company that owned the planes she was going to buy, and the president of the bank where the princess deposited her money, result in him uncovering the identity of the killer.

== Cast ==
- Boris Karloff as Mr. James Lee Wong
- Marjorie Reynolds as Roberta 'Bobbie' Logan (reporter)
- Grant Withers as Police Capt. Bill Street
- Huntley Gordon as Mr. Davidson (bank president)
- George Lynn as Capt. Guy Jackson (Aviation Corp. president) (as Peter George Lynn)
- William Royle as Capt. Jaime (captain, Maid of the Orient)
- James Flavin as Police Sgt. Jerry
- Lotus Long as Princess Lin Hwa (murder victim)
- Lee Tung Foo as Willie (Wong's servant) (as Lee Tong Foo)
- Bessie Loo as Lilly May (Princess Lin Hwa's maid)
- Richard Loo as Tong chief
- Ernie Stanton as Burton (Davidson's butler)
- I. Stanford Jolley as Hotel clerk
- Angelo Rossitto as Mute Little Person (uncredited)

== Preservation ==
A print is held by the Library of Congress.
