= Up in Mabel's Room (1926 film) =

1926 film by E. Mason Hopper

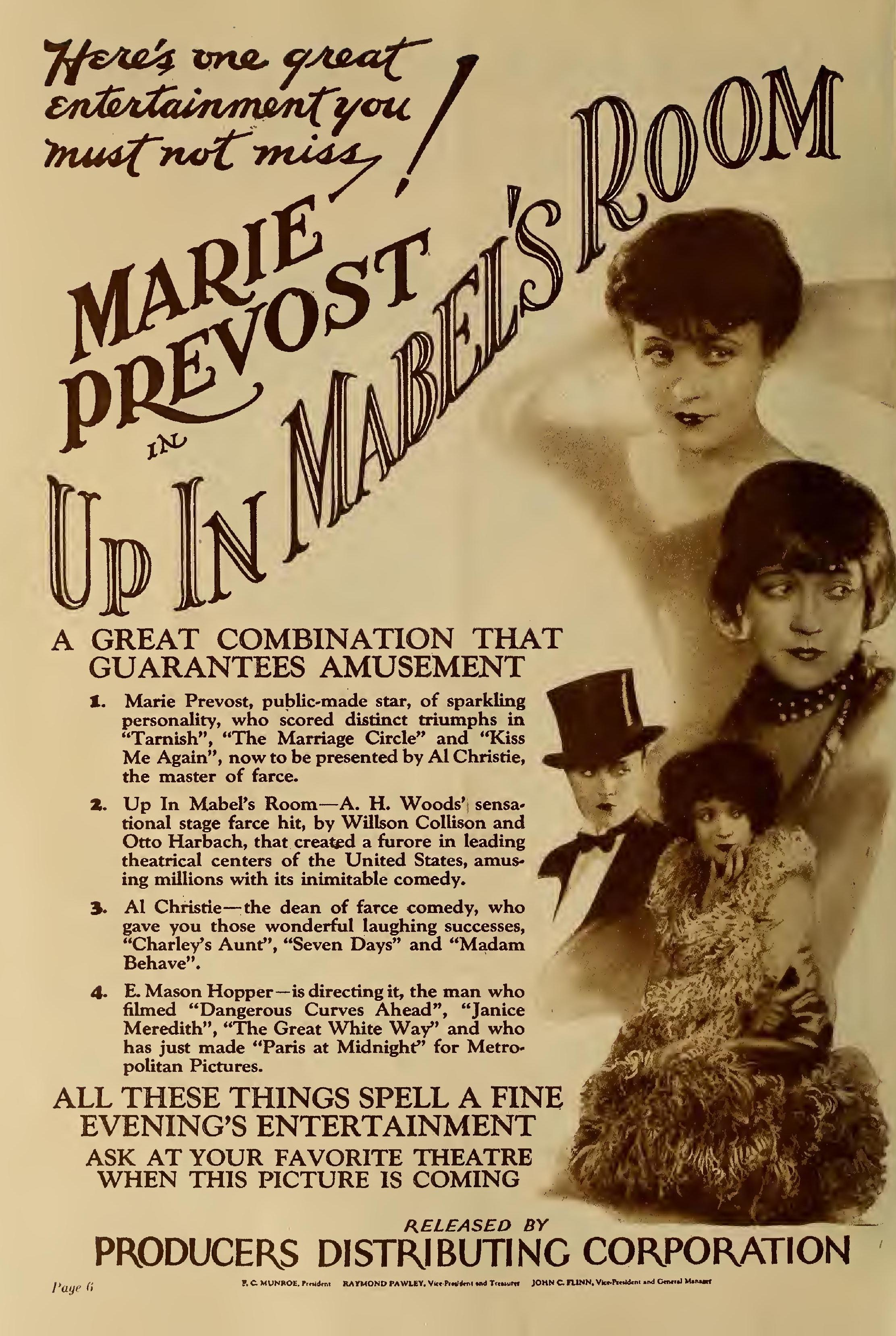
- Advertisement
- Directed by: E. Mason Hopper
- Written by: Tay Garnett; F. McGrew Willis
- Based on: Up in Mabel's Room by Wilson Collison and Otto Harbach
- Produced by: Al Christie
- Starring: Marie Prevost; Harrison Ford
- Cinematography: Alex Phillips; Hal Rosson
- Edited by: James B. Morley
- Production company: Christie Film Company
- Distributed by: Producers Distributing Corporation
- Release date: June 26, 1926 (United States)
- Running time: 70 mins.
- Country: United States
- Language: Silent (English intertitles)

Up in Mabel's Room is a 1926 American silent comedy film directed by E. Mason Hopper and starring Marie Prevost and Harrison Ford. It is based on the 1919 play of the same name by Wilson Collison and Otto Harbach.

The film was remade in 1944 starring Marjorie Reynolds, Dennis O'Keefe and Gail Patrick.

Full film

== Cast ==
- Marie Prevost as Mabel Ainsworth
- Harrison Ford as Garry Ainsworth
- Phyllis Haver as Sylvia Wells
- Harry Myers as Jimmy Larchmont
- Sylvia Breamer as Alicia
- Carl Gerard as Arthur Walters
- Arthur Hoyt as Simpson
- William Orlamond as Hawkins
- Paul Nicholson as Leonard Mason
- Maude Truax as Henrietta

== Preservation status ==
A print of Up in Mabel's Room is held by the Museum of Modern Art (MOMA).
