= The Fatal Hour (1940 film) =

1940 film by William Nigh

- Theatrical release poster
- Directed by: William Nigh
- Written by: Hugh Wiley; Scott Darling; George Waggner
- Produced by: Scott R. Dunlap; William T. Lackey
- Starring: Boris Karloff; Grant Withers; Marjorie Reynolds
- Cinematography: Harry Neumann
- Edited by: Russell F. Schoengarth
- Music by: Edward J. Kay
- Distributed by: Monogram Pictures Corporation
- Release date: January 15, 1940
- Running time: 68 minutes
- Country: United States
- Language: English

The Fatal Hour is a 1940 American thriller crime drama film directed by William Nigh and starring Boris Karloff (as James Lee Wong), Grant Withers, and Marjorie Reynolds.

Fourth installation of the series, the film is also known as Mr. Wong at Headquarters in the United Kingdom. The picture was followed by the sequel Doomed to Die, which also stars Karloff, Reynolds and Withers.

== Plot ==
The body of policeman Dan Grady is recovered in the San Francisco Bay lifeless and with clear indications of an execution. His good friend Captain Street, very touched by the tragedy, asks for the help of Mr. Wong and the journalist Bobbie Logan to solve the mystery. Dan was carrying out an investigation into gemstone smuggling, and the investigation leads to suspicion of jeweler Frank Belden's shop. A witness appears who saw Dan at 8.30 pm the night before at the Neptune club, a disreputable place run by Harry Lockett, a well-known cheater, con man and smuggler. The investigations will lead to the discovery of a ring of precious stone trafficking that revolved around the Neptune, in which both the owner and Frank Belden himself, and the vamp Tanya Serova were involved. Slowly, however, all the members of the gang end up killed, and the blame seems to fall on the young Frank Belden Jr., son of the jeweler, and boyfriend of Serova. Wong himself discovers the cunning ploy devised by the real culprit to frame the young man, so the head of the gang, lawyer John T. Forbes, is arrested by Captain Street thanks to the decisive collaboration of Miss Logan.

== Cast ==
- Boris Karloff as James Lee Wong
- Grant Withers as Capt. Bill Street
- Marjorie Reynolds as Roberta 'Bobbie' Logan
- Charles Trowbridge as John T. Forbes
- Frank Puglia as Harry 'Hardway' Lockett
- Craig Reynolds as Frank Belden, Jr.
- Lita Chevret as Tanya Serova
- Harry Strang as Det. Ballard
- Hooper Atchley as Frank Belden Sr.
- Jason Robards Sr. as Griswold (billed as Jason Robards)
- Richard Loo as Jeweler
- Jack Kennedy as Mike, Police Sergeant
- Allan Cavan as Radio Station Owner (uncredited)
- Harry Harvey as Radio Salesman (uncredited)
