= Mr. Wong (fictional detective) =

James Lee Wong
- First appearance: Medium Well Done
- Last appearance: The Room of Death
- Created by: Hugh Wiley
- Portrayed by: Boris Karloff; Keye Luke

In-universe information
- Gender: Male
- Occupation: Detective
- Nationality: Chinese-American

James Lee Wong, known simply as Mr. Wong, is a fictional Chinese-American detective created by Hugh Wiley (1884–1968). Mr. Wong appeared in twenty magazine stories and a film series of six, the first five of which starred English actor Boris Karloff as Wong, the last with Chinese-American actor Keye Luke in the role, the first Asian lead.

== Description ==
In his story "No Witnesses", Wiley describes Mr. Wong as six feet tall, educated at Yale University and "with the face of a foreign devil-a Yankee". In the stories, he is an agent of the United States Treasury Department and lives in San Francisco.

== Short stories ==
Story title	Release date	Publisher	Collected
"Medium Well Done"	1934	Collier's	Murder by the Dozen
"The Thirty Thousand Dollar Bomb"	1934	Collier's	Murder by the Dozen
"In Chinatown"	1934	Collier's	No
"Ten Bells"	1934	Collier's	Murder by the Dozen
"Long Chance"	1934	Collier's	Murder by the Dozen
"A Ray of Light"	1935	Collier's	Murder by the Dozen
"Too Much Ice"	1935	Collier's	No
"Jaybird's Chance"	1935	Collier's	Murder by the Dozen
"Scorned Woman"	1935	Collier's	Murder by the Dozen
"Three Words"	1935	Collier's	Murder by the Dozen
"No Witnesses"	1936	Collier's	Murder by the Dozen
"Seven of Spades"	1936	Collier's	Murder by the Dozen
"Hangman's Knot"	1937	Collier's	No
"No Smoking"	1937	Collier's	No
"The Eye of Heaven"	1938	Collier's	No
"The Bell from China"	1938	Collier's	Murder by the Dozen
"The Feast of Kali"	1938	Collier's	Murder by the Dozen
"The Heart of Kwan Yin"	1940	Collier's	No
"Footwork"	1940	Collier's	No
"The Room of Death"	1940	Collier's	No

== Films ==
The Mr. Wong character was featured in a series of films for Monogram Pictures. The first five starred Boris Karloff and were directed by William Nigh. All the films co-starred Grant Withers as Wong's friend, Police Captain Street. Karloff also played the Chinese character Dr. Fu Manchu in The Mask of Fu Manchu (1932) and General Wu Yen Fang, in West of Shanghai (1937), just prior to the first Mr. Wong.

The sixth film featured Chinese-American actor Keye Luke in the title role, the first time an American sound film used an Asian actor to play a lead Asian detective (although Karloff had some Indian ancestry). Luke had formerly played one of Charlie Chan's sons in the Chan mysteries and Kato in The Green Hornet 1939 serial. In the prequel of the Mr. Wong series, the young "Jimmy Wong" (Luke) was introduced to Police Captain Street, whom Karloff's character worked with in the previous films. A 1940 article, Keye Luke Sleuths on his Own, in the Hollywood Citizen News, announced that Luke had been signed for four Mr. Wong pictures a year. However, due to Karloff's departure, exhibitors lost interest and the series ended.

Film title	Star	Director	Released	Distributor	Notes
Mr. Wong, Detective	Boris Karloff	William Nigh	1938	Monogram Pictures	
The Mystery of Mr. Wong	Boris Karloff	William Nigh	1939	Monogram Pictures	
Mr. Wong in Chinatown	Boris Karloff	William Nigh	1939	Monogram Pictures	
The Fatal Hour	Boris Karloff	William Nigh	1940	Monogram Pictures	Also known as Mr. Wong at Headquarters
Doomed to Die	Boris Karloff	William Nigh	1940	Monogram Pictures	
Phantom of Chinatown	Keye Luke	Phil Rosen	1940	Monogram Pictures	

== Comics ==
From 1939 to 1940 a comic of the film The Mystery of Mr Wong appeared in four consecutive issues of Popular Comics (Dell, issues 38–41, 1939–40).

== See also ==
- Charlie Chan
- Mr. Moto
- Portrayal of East Asians in Hollywood
