= SS Morro Castle =

SS Morro Castle may refer to:

- SS Morro Castle (1900), a ship launched by the Ward Line and scrapped in 1926.
- SS Morro Castle (1930), a ship that burned in 1934. Also owned by the Ward Line.
