= Up in Mabel's Room (1944 film) =

1944 film by Allan Dwan

- Theatrical release poster
- Directed by: Allan Dwan
- Written by: Tom Reed; Isabel Dawn (additional dialogue)
- Based on: Up in Mabel's Room by Wilson Collison and Otto A. Harbach
- Produced by: Edward Small
- Starring: Marjorie Reynolds; Dennis O'Keefe; Gail Patrick
- Cinematography: Charles Lawton Jr.
- Edited by: Grant Whytock
- Music by: Edward Paul; Michel Michelet
- Production company: Edward Small Productions
- Distributed by: United Artists
- Release date: April 7, 1944 (United States)
- Running time: 76 minutes
- Country: United States
- Language: English
- Box office: over $1 million

Up in Mabel's Room is a 1944 American comedy film directed by Allan Dwan and starring Marjorie Reynolds, Dennis O'Keefe and Gail Patrick. It is based on the 1919 play by Wilson Collison and Otto A. Harbach. The film's composer, Edward Paul, was nominated for an Academy Award for Best Original Score in 1945.

The film is a remake of a 1926 silent film of the same name, starring Marie Prevost.

== Plot ==
Engineer Gary Ainsworth (Dennis O'Keefe) is about to celebrate one month of marriage to his wife Geraldine (Marjorie Reynolds), when his ex-girlfriend Mabel Essington (Gail Patrick) contacts him. Now in a relationship with Gary's business partner Arthur Weldon (Lee Bowman), she wants to return a gift she got from Gary when they were vacationing in Mexico City. Mabel comes to Gary's office with the gift, arriving while Arthur is out on business. Gary and Mabel share a taxi back home from the office. Mabel gives the gift, a slip with a loving message from Gary embroidered on it, to Gary. As he exits the taxi he leaves the gift behind, wishing to be rid of it, but Mabel delivers it to his apartment and threatens to show it to his wife if he doesn't reveal that they had a romance in Mexico City.

The following weekend, the two couples visit Arthur's sister Martha (Charlotte Greenwood), bringing another couple, Alicia and Jimmy Larchmont (Binnie Barnes and John Hubbard). Geraldine notices that Gary is acting suspiciously and keeps an eye on him. For a sum of money, Gary gets the waiter and manservant Boris (Mischa Auer) to sneak into Mabel's room and steal the slip back from her. Boris manages to get into the room and find the slip. That evening he gives it to Gary, who drops it into his dinner-jacket pocket. The slip falls out of the pocket while Gary is dancing with his wife, and he quickly stuffs it down a vase to avoid discovery. Sure of himself, he tells Mabel he'll tell Geraldine about their past as soon as she brings him the slip.

When Gary plucks the slip from the vase, he notices that it's the wrong one. When Geraldine goes off to phone her mother for advice about Gary's strange behavior, Alicia deliberately flirts with him to see what's going on. He tells her the secret, and she promptly tells Martha. Mabel discovers that her room has been burgled and tells Martha about the slip. Gary and Boris make another attempt to steal the slip back, entering Mabel's room through the window, but Mabel interrupts them and they are forced to hide under the bed.

Geraldine tells the others that she has spotted an intruder on the roof, and Martha gets her shotgun to fend him off. Noticing that Alicia is showing far too much interest in Gary, her husband Jimmy suspects that they are having an affair. Gary and Boris eventually manage to escape from Mabel's bedroom when she leaves, and they manage to find the right slip. While Gary holds it, Jimmy comes into the room and assuming he's holding Alicia's slip. There is a knock on the door and the three men all hide under the bed, unaware that it is Arthur. Mabel comes into the room again and discovers the men hiding under her bed. Boris escapes up onto the roof, but Martha fires her gun at him, making him climb back in through the window. Geraldine faints onto the floor and spots her husband under Mabel's bed.

The next day Gary is sitting alone and abandoned in the library when Martha comes in carrying her maid's sister's baby in her arms. Since Martha is going to the maid's wedding reception, she asks Gary to watch the baby for her. Martha tells Gary she has disposed of the slip by giving it to her maid Priscilla (Jane Lambert) as a wedding gift. Alicia and Arthur see him holding the baby and believe it's his and Mabel's illegitimate child. Gary and Boris make one last attempt to retrieve the slip by crashing the wedding, and they accidentally interrupt the ceremony. Boris tries to take the slip off Priscilla's wrist, but the groom knocks him out. Geraldine is about to leave the house when Gary finally returns with the slip. Gary manages to explain that it was this slip he was guilty of and Geraldine believes him. Soon after, Geraldine's mother phones again, but Geraldine no longer needs her advice.

== Cast ==
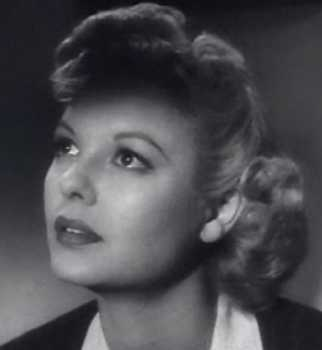
Marjorie Reynolds

- Marjorie Reynolds as Geraldine Ainsworth
- Dennis O'Keefe as Gary Ainsworth
- Gail Patrick as Mabel Essington
- Mischa Auer as Boris
- Charlotte Greenwood as Martha
- Binnie Barnes as Alicia Larchmont
- Lee Bowman as Arthur Weldon
- John Hubbard as Jimmy Larchmont
- Jane Lambert as Priscilla
- Fred Kohler, Jr. as Johnny
- Harry Hayden as Justice of the Peace

== Production ==
Edward Small bought rights in October 1941. He paid $25,000 for the rights and spent another $50,000 on adaptations that satisfied the Hays Office. This meant the film – which was to star Ilona Massey and Louis Hayward and be made after Twin Beds – took longer to make than anticipated.

Joan Bennett was announced to play the female lead but dropped out, reportedly over billing. Gail Patrick stepped up to the lead and Binnie Barnes took over her role.
