= Marjorie Reynolds =

American actress (1917–1997)

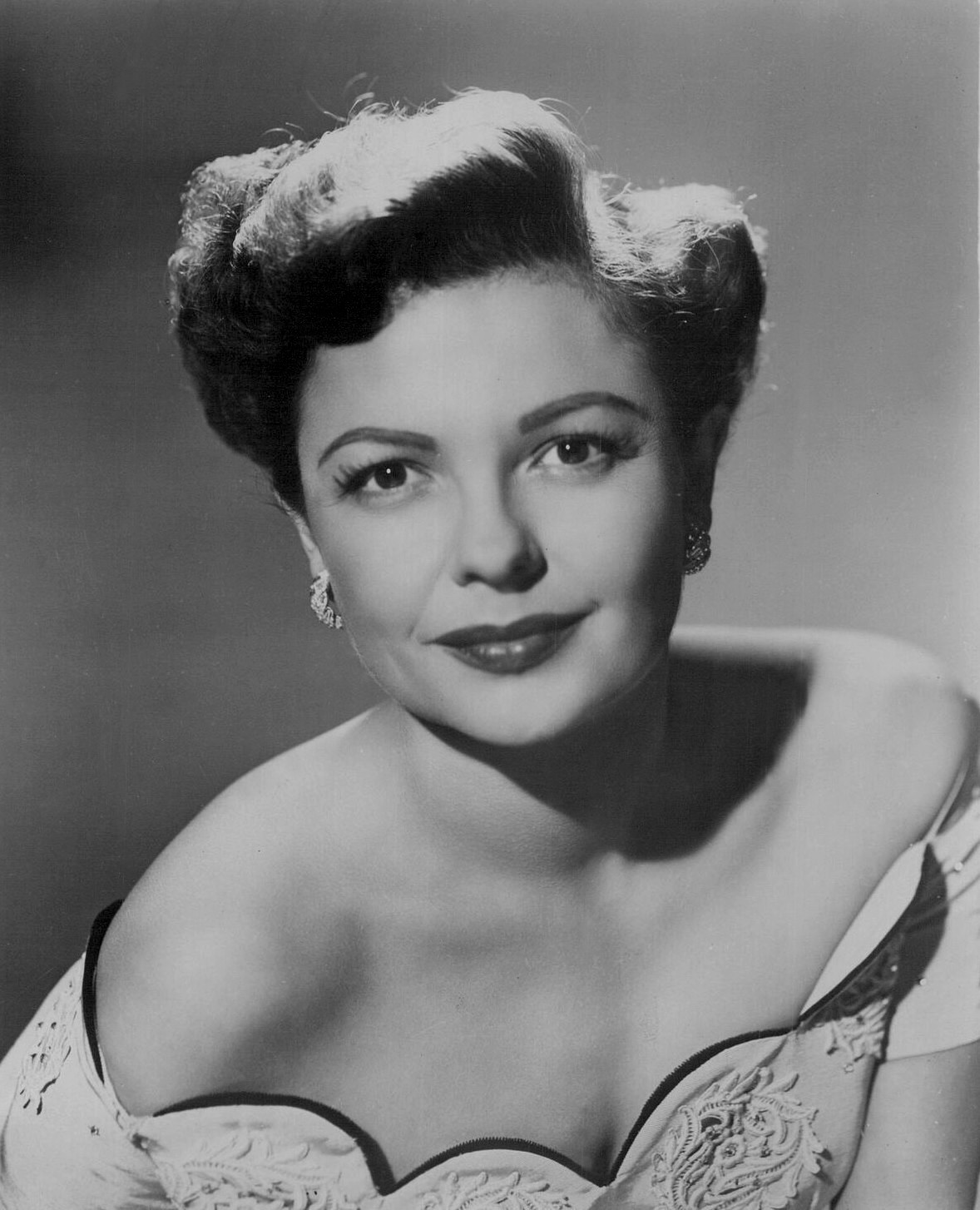
- Reynolds in 1955
- Born: Marjorie Goodspeed; August 12, 1917; Buhl, Idaho, U.S.
- Died: February 1, 1997 (aged 79); Manhattan Beach, California, U.S.
- Occupation: Actress
- Years active: 1923–24; 1933–78
- Spouses: Jack Reynolds (m. 1936; div. 1952) John M. Haffen (performed as John Whitney) (m. 1953; died 1985)
- Children: 1

Marjorie Reynolds (née Goodspeed; August 12, 1917 – February 1, 1997) was an American film and television actress who appeared in more than 50 films, including the 1942 musical Holiday Inn, in which she and Bing Crosby introduced the song "White Christmas" in a duet, albeit with her singing dubbed by Martha Mears.

== Early life ==
Reynolds was born Marjorie Goodspeed in Buhl, Idaho, the daughter of a doctor and his wife. She acted under the names Marjorie Goodspeed and Marjorie Moore. When she was three years old, her family moved to Los Angeles, California. She began to take dancing lessons at age 4. She attended Los Angeles High School.

== Career ==
Beginning at age 6, Reynolds was a featured child actress in such silent films as Scaramouche (1923). At age 8 she stopped acting to concentrate on education until leaving school at 16 to play a ballerina in Herbert Brenon's Wine, Women and Song (1933). She went on to appear in bit parts in many films, including Gone with the Wind (1939) and as a chorus girl in Paramount Pictures musicals. Her first speaking role was in Murder in Greenwich Village (1937) and she then appeared in a number of westerns for Poverty Row studios opposite most of the cowboy stars of the time with the exception of Gene Autry.

Reynolds played the loyal girlfriend opposite wrongly accused Richard Cromwell in Enemy Agent (1940). That same year, in The Fatal Hour, Reynolds appeared for Monogram Pictures as a reporter on the trail of Boris Karloff's detective James Lee Wong and opposite Grant Withers as a cop.

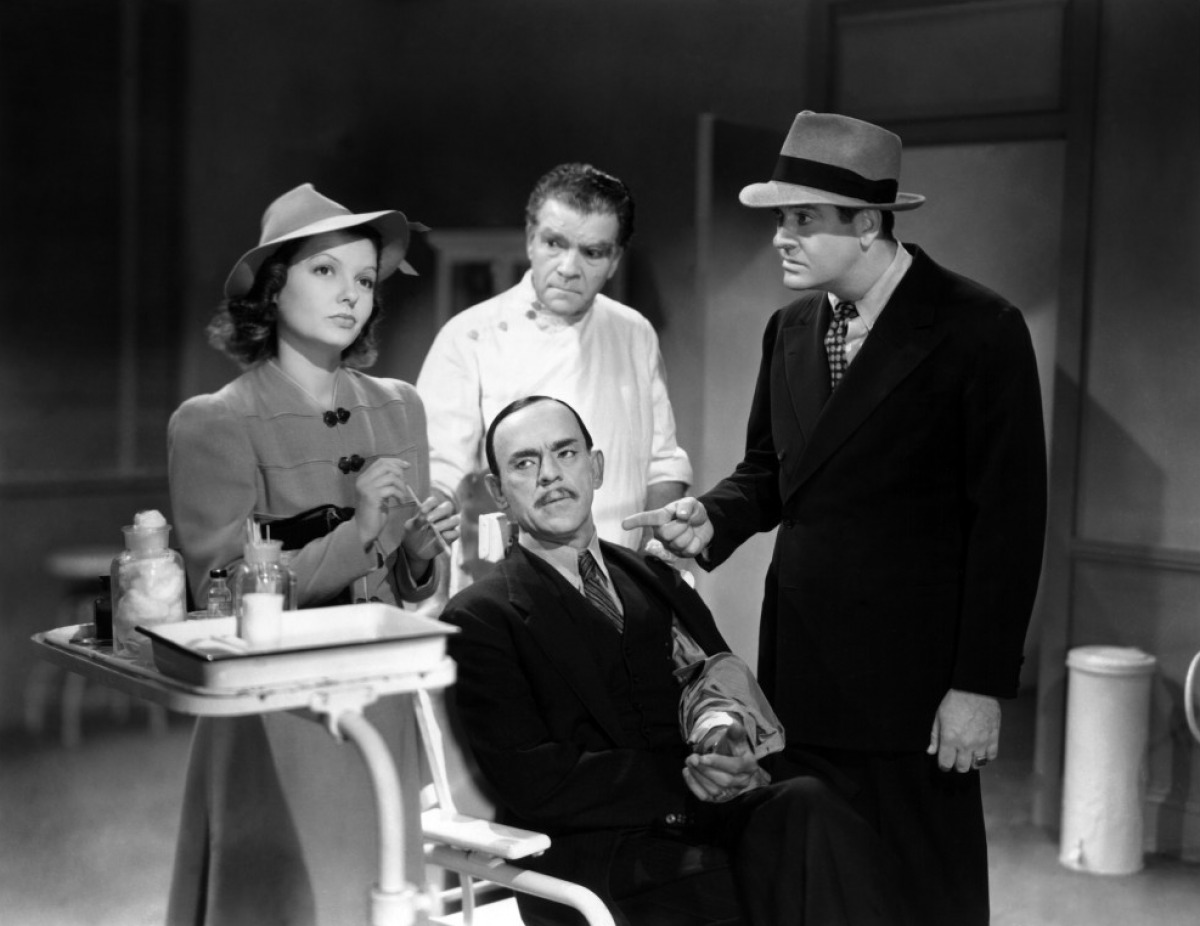
Doomed to Die (1940), Boris Karloff seated. Standing L-R, Marjorie Reynolds, Gibson Gowland, Grant Withers

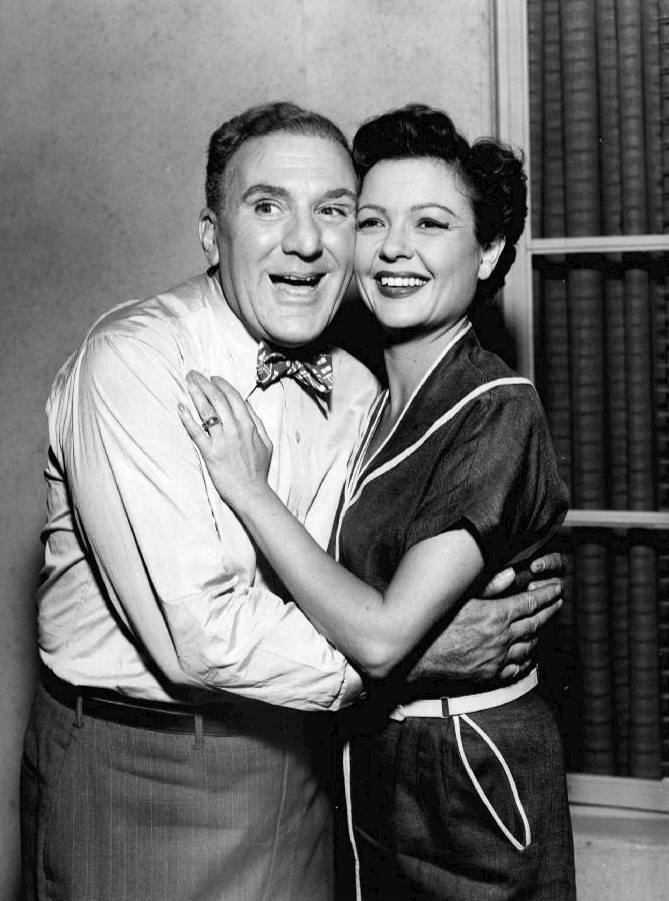
William Bendix and Marjorie Reynolds in a 1956 episode of the television series The Life of Riley

Perhaps her best-known film was Holiday Inn (1942), which introduced the classic song "White Christmas". She performed the song both as a duet with Bing Crosby and later in a solo performance, although her singing was dubbed by Martha Mears. The movie also showcased her dancing ability.

She also had major roles in Fritz Lang's Ministry of Fear (1944) and in the movie Up in Mabel's Room (1944). Her career progression was hindered by the premature death of her mentor, Mark Sandrich.

Reynolds starred with Abbott and Costello in the supernatural comedy The Time of Their Lives (1946), one of the few films with Abbott and Costello as leads but not together as a team. Instead, Costello spends most of his screen time with Reynolds; they play a pair of American Revolution ghosts who need the help of Abbott and his friends to get to heaven. Leonard Maltin's review of the film describes it as "Most unusual film for A&C and one of their best... Imaginative, funny, and well done." She was cast in a supporting role in Mario Lanza's film debut, That Midnight Kiss (1949).

She later appeared in the NBC version of the television series The Life of Riley (1953–1958) and appeared on three episodes of the television series Leave it to Beaver (1960–1963).

== Personal life ==
Reynolds was married to Jack Reynolds, a casting director. The couple had a daughter, Linda, and divorced in 1952. Her second husband was film editor Jon M. Haffen (who during his acting career had been billed as John Whitney). He died in 1985.

== Death ==
Reynolds died of congestive heart disease in Manhattan Beach, California, on February 1, 1997, having collapsed while walking her dog. She was 79 years old.

== Legacy ==
Reynolds has a star in the Television section of the Hollywood Walk of Fame, at 1525 Vine Street.

== Acting credits ==
=== Film ===
Year	Title	Role	Director	Producer	Studio/Distributor	Other cast members	Refs.
1923	The Broken Wing	Child (uncredited)	Tom Forman	B. P. Shulberg Productions	Al Lichtman, Preferred Pictures, Exclusivité Equitable Films	Kenneth Harlan, Miriam Cooper	
1923	Scaramouche	Bit part (uncredited)	Rex Ingram	Rex Ingram	Metro-Goldwyn-Mayer	Ramon Novarro, Alice Terry, Lewis Stone	
1923	Trilby	Waif (uncredited)	James Young	Richard Walton Tully	Associated First National Pictures	Andrée Lafayette, Creighton Hale	
1924	Revelation	Child (uncredited)	George D. Baker		Metro-Goldwyn-Mayer	Viola Dana, Monte Blue, Lew Cody	
1933	Wine, Women and Song	Marilyn Arnette (credited as Marjorie Moore)	Herbert Brenon	I. E. Chadwick	State Rights	Lilyan Tashman, Lew Cody	
1933	College Humor	(uncredited)	Wesley Ruggles	William LeBaron		Bing Crosby, Jack Oakie, Richard Arlen, Mary Carlisle	
1935	Collegiate	(uncredited)	Ralph Murphy	Adolph Zukor	Paramount Pictures	Jack Oakie	
1936	The Big Broadcast of 1937	(uncredited)	Mitchell Leisen	Adolph Zukor	Paramount Pictures	Jack Benny	
1936	Three Cheers for Love	(Uncredited)	Ray McCarey	Adolph Zukor	Paramount Pictures	Robert Cummings, Eleanore Whitney	
1936	College Holiday	Student (uncredited)	Frank Tuttle	William LeBaron, Harlan Thompson	Paramount	Jack Benny, George Burns, Gracie Allen, Martha Raye	
1936	Dancing Pirate	(Uncredited)	Lloyd Corrigan	Merian C. Cooper	RKO Pictures	Rita Hayworth, Frank Morgan, Charles Collins	
1937	Murder in Greenwich Village	Molly Murphy	Albert S. Rogell	Irving Briskin	Columbia Pictures	Richard Arlen, Fay Wray	
1937	Tex Rides with the Boy Scouts	Norma Willis	Ray Taylor	Edward L. Alperson	Grand National Films Inc.	Tex Ritter, Philip Ahn	
1938	Western Trails	Alice	George Waggner	Paul Malvern	Universal Pictures	Bob Baker	
1938	Delinquent Parents	Edythe Ellis as a young woman	Nick Grinde	Ben N. Judell	State Rights	Doris Weston	
1938	Rebellious Daughters	Claire	Jean Yarbrough	Ben N. Judell	State Rights	Verna Hillie	
1938	Six Shootin' Sheriff	Molly Morgan	Harry L. Fraser	Max Alexander	Grand National Films Inc.	Ken Maynard	
1938	The Overland Express	Jean Greeley	Drew Eberson	L. G. Leonard	Columbia Pictures	Buck Jones	
1938	Black Bandit	Jane Allen	George Waggner	Trem Carr	Universal Pictures	Bob Baker	
1938	Guilty Trails	Jackie	George Waggner	Trem Carr	Universal Pictures	Bob Baker	
1938	Man's Country	Madge Crane	Robert Hill	Robert Tansey	Monogram Pictures	Jack Randall	
1939	Gone with the Wind	(uncredited)	Victor Fleming	David O. Selznick	Metro-Goldwyn-Mayer	Vivien Leigh	
1939	Mr. Wong in Chinatown	Bobby Logan	William Nigh	William T. Lackey	Monogram Pictures	Boris Karloff, Grant Withers	
1939	Streets of New York	Anne Carroll	William Nigh	Scott R. Dunlap	Monagram Pictures	Jackie Cooper	
1939	Sky Patrol	Betty Lou Barnes	Howard Bretherton	Paul Malvern	Monogram Pictures	Jackie Coogan, Milburn Stone, Jason Robards Sr.	
1939	Racketeers of the Range	Helen Lewis	D. Ross Lederman	Bert Gilroy	RKO Radio Pictures	George O'Brien, Chill Wills	
1939	Danger Flight	Betty Lou	Howard Bretherton	Paul Malvern	Monogram Pictures	Milburn Stone, Jacon Robards Sr.	
1939	Mystery Plane	Betty Lou	George Waggner	Paul Malvern	Monogram Pictures	Milburn Stone, Jason Robards Sr.	
1939	Stunt Pilot	Betty Lou	George Waggner	Paul Malvern	Monogram Pictures	Milburn Stone, Jason Robards Sr.	
1939	The Phantom Stage	Mary	George Waggner	Trem Carr	Universal Pictures	Bob Baker	
1939	Timber Stampede	Anne Carr	David Howard	Bert Gilroy	RKO Radio Pictures	Chill Wills	
1940	The Fatal Hour	Bobby Logan	William Nigh	William T. Lackey	Monogram Pictures	Boris Karloff, Grant Withers	
1940	Doomed to Die	Bobby Logan	William Nigh	William T. Lackey	Monogram Pictures	Boris Karloff, Grant Withers	
1940	Midnight Limited	Joan Marshall	Howard Bretherton	T. R. Williams	Monogram Pictures	John 'Dusty' King	
1940	Chasing Trouble	Susie	Howard Bretherton	Grant Withers	Monogram Pictures	Frankie Darro, Mantan Moreland, Milburn Stone	
1940	Up in the Air	Anne Mason	Howard Bretherton	Lindsley Parsons	Monogram Pictures	Frankie Darro, Mantan Moreland	
1940	Enemy Agent	Peggy O'Reilly	Lew Landers	Ben Pivar	Universal Pictures	Richard Cromwell, Helen Vinson, Robert Armstrong	
1941	Cyclone on Horseback	Mary Corbin	Edward Killy	Bert Gilroy	RKO Radio Pictures	Tim Holt	
1941	Dude Cowboy	Barbara Adams	David Howard	Bert Gilroy	RKO Radio Pictures	Tim Holt	
1941	The Great Swindle	Margaret Swann	Lewis D. Collins	Larry Darmour	Columbia Pictures	Jack Holt	
1941	Robin Hood of the Pecos	Jeanie Grayson	Joseph Kane	Joseph Kane	Republic Pictures	Roy Rogers, George "Gabby" Hayes	
1941	Secret Evidence	Linda Wilson	William Nigh	E.B. Derr	Producers Releasing Corporation	Charles Quigley	
1941	Tillie the Toiler	Bubbles	Sidney Salkow	Robert Sparks	Columbia Pictures	William Tracy, Sylvia Field	
1941	Top Sergeant Mulligan	Gail Nash	Jean Yarbrough	Lindsley Parsons	Monogram Pictures	Nat Pendleton, Carol Hughes, Sterling Holloway	
1941	Law of the Timber	Perry Lorimar	Bernard B. Ray	Bernard B. Ray	Producers Releasing Corporation	Monte Blue, J. Farrell MacDonald	
1942	Holiday Inn	Linda Mason	Mark Sandrich	Mark Sandrich	Paramount Pictures	Bing Crosby, Fred Astaire, Virginia Dale	
1943	Dixie	Jean Mason	A. Edward Sutherland	Paul Jones	Paramount Pictures	Bing Crosby, Dorothy Lamour, Billy De Wolfe, Clara Blandick, Eddie Foy, Jr.	
1943	Star Spangled Rhythm	Herself	George Marshall	Joseph Sistrom	Paramount Pictures	Bing Crosby, Bob Hope, Eddie "Rochester" Anderson, Mary Martin, Veronica Lake	
1944	Ministry of Fear	Carla Hilfe	Fritz Lang	Buddy G. DeSylva	Paramount Pictures	Ray Milland, Carl Esmond, Hillary Brooke	
1944	3 Is a Family	Kitty Mitchell	Edward Ludwig	Sol Lesser	United Artists	Charles Ruggles, Fay Bainter, Hattie McDaniel, Arthur Lake	
1944	Up in Mabel's Room	Geraldine Ainsworth	Allan Dwan	Edward Small	United Artists	Charlotte Greenwood, Gail Patrick, Dennis O'Keefe	
1945	Bring on the Girls	Sue Thomas	Sidney Lanfield	Fred Kohlmar	Paramount Pictures	Eddie Bracken, Veronica Lake	
1945	Duffy's Tavern	Peggy O'Malley	Hal Walker	Danny Dare	Paramount Pictures	Bing Crosby	
1946	Meet Me on Broadway	Ann Stallings	Leigh Jacon	Burt Kelly	Columbia Pictures	Fred Brady	
1946	Monsieur Beaucaire	Princess Maria of Spain	George Marshall	Paul Jones	Paramount Pictures	Bob Hope	
1946	The Time of Their Lives	Melody Allen	Charles Barton	Val Burton	Universal Pictures	Bud Abbott, Lou Costello, Gale Sondergaard	
1947	Heaven Only Knows	Ginger	Albert S. Rogell	Seymour Nebenzal	United Artists	Robert Cummings, Brian Donlevy	
1949	Bad Men of Tombstone	Julie	Kurt Neumann	Maurice King	King Brothers Productions	Barry Sullivan, Broderick Crawford	
1949	That Midnight Kiss	Mary	Norman Taurog	Joe Pasternak	Metro-Goldwyn-Mayer	Mario Lanza, Kathryn Grayson	
1950	Customs Agent	Lucille Gerrard	Seymour Friedman	Rudolph Flothow	Columbia Pictures	Benson Fong, William Eythe	
1950	The Great Jewel Robber	Martha Rollins	Peter Godfrey	Bryan Foy	Warner Bros.	John Archer, David Brian	
1950	Rookie Fireman	Margie Williams	Seymour Friedman	Milton Feldman	Columbia Pictures	Bill Williams, Barton MacLane	
1951	His Kind of Woman	Helen Cardigan	John Farrow	Robert Sparks	RKO Pictures	Robert Mitchum, Jane Russell, Vincent Price	
1951	Home Town Story	Janice Hunt	Arthur Pierson	Arthur Pierson	Metro-Goldwyn-Mayer	Jeffrey Lynn, Donald Crisp, Alan Hale, Jr.	
1952	Models Inc.	Peggy Howard	Reginald LeBorg	Jack Dietz	Mutual Pictures Corporation	Howard Duff, Coleen Gray	
1952	No Holds Barred	Rhonda Nelson	William Beaudine	Jerry Thomas	Monogram Pictures	Leo Gorcey, Huntz Hall, David Gorcey, Bernard Gorcey	
1956	Mobs, Inc.	Mary Hale Browne (archive footage)	William Asher			Reed Hadley	
1959	Juke Box Rhythm	Martha Manton	Arthur Dreifuss	Sam Katzman	Columbia Pictures	Jo Morrow, Jack Jones, Brian Donlevy	
1962	The Silent Witness	Mary	Ken Kennedy	Ken Kennedy	Emerson Film Enterprises Inc.	George Kennedy	

=== Television ===
Year	Title	Role	Episode	Refs.
1949	Hands of Mystery		Secret Life of a Killer	
1951	The Bigelow Theatre		A Case of Marriage	
1951	Hollywood Theatre Time	Sally Sanders	The Spectre	
1951	Racket Squad		The Fabulous Mr. James	
1951	Gruen Guild Theater		The Luckiest Guy in the World	
1951	Gruen Guild Theater		Peril in the House	
1952	The Unexpected	The Blonde	The Slide Rule Blonde	
1953	The Abbott and Costello Show	Nurse	Peace and Quiet	
1955	The Millionaire	Louise Malcolm	The Fred Malcolm Story	
1953–1958	The Life of Riley	Peg Riley	76 episodes	
1960	The Millionaire	Barbara's Mother	Millionaire Dixon Cooper	
1960	Shirley Temple's Storybook	Betty	Emmy Lou	
1960	Leave It to Beaver	Mrs. Murdock	Chuckie's New Shoes	
1961	Whispering Smith	Baby Doll Harris	The Idol	
1961	Surfside 6	Mrs. Phelps	Little Star Lost	
1962	Tales of Wells Fargo	Helen Mapes	Don't Wake a Tiger	
1962	Alcoa Premiere	Eleanor	The Cake Baker	
1962	Leave It to Beaver	Mrs. Murdock	Beaver the Babysitter	
1962	Our Man Higgins	Dodie Bannister	The Three Faces of Higgins	
1963	Laramie	Mrs. Sherman	The Last Battleground	
1963	Leave It to Beaver	Mildred Gregory	The All-Night Party	
1963	Wide Country	Katy Blaufus	The Quest for Jacob Blaufus	
1963	Our Man Higgins	Dodie Bannister	Black Thursday	
1963	Our Man Higgins	Dodie Bannister	The Milkman Cometh	
1969	The Good Guys	Annie Butterworth	Love Comes to Annie Butterworth	
1978	Pearl	Nurse #3		

== Notes ==
=== References ===
- Bridges, Herb (1998). Filming of Gone With the Wind. Mercer University Press. ISBN 978-0-86554-621-9.
- Brooks, Tim; Marsh, Earle F. (2007). The Complete Directory to Prime Time Network and Cable TV Shows, 1946-Present. Random House. ISBN 978-0-345-49773-4.
- Hischak, Thomas S. (2008). The Oxford Companion to the American Musical: Theatre, Film, and Television. Oxford University Press. ISBN 978-0-19-533533-0.
- Monush, Barry (1965). The Encyclopedia of Hollywood Film Actors. Applause Theatre & Cinema Books. ISBN 978-1-55783-551-2.
- Terrace, Vincent (1985). Encyclopedia of Television: Series, Pilots and Specials 1974–1984. New York Zoetrope. ISBN 978-0-918432-61-2.
