= Gunman's Code =

1946 film

- Directed by: Wallace Fox
- Written by: Sherman L. Lowe; Arthur St. Claire; William Lively
- Produced by: Wallace Fox
- Starring: Kirby Grant; Fuzzy Knight; Jane Adams
- Cinematography: Maury Gertsman
- Edited by: Patrick Kelly
- Music by: Milton Rosen
- Production company: Universal Pictures
- Distributed by: Universal Pictures
- Release date: August 1946
- Running time: 55 minutes
- Country: United States
- Language: English

Gunman's Code is a 1946 American Western film directed by Wallace Fox and starring Kirby Grant, Fuzzy Knight and Jane Adams.

== Cast ==
- Kirby Grant as Jack Douglas
- Fuzzy Knight as Bosco O'Toole
- Jane Adams as Laura Burton
- Danny Morton as Lee Fain
- Bernard Thomas as Danny Burton
- Charles Miller as Sam Burton
- Karl Hackett as Rancher Ben Lewis
- Frank McCarroll as Henchman Trigger

== Bibliography ==
- Blottner, Gene. Universal Sound Westerns, 1929-1946: The Complete Filmography. McFarland & Company, 2003.
