= Code of the Lawless =

1945 film

- Theatrical release poster
- Directed by: Wallace Fox
- Screenplay by: Patricia Harper
- Produced by: Wallace Fox
- Starring: Kirby Grant; Fuzzy Knight; Poni Adams; Hugh Prosser; Barbara Sears; Edward Howard
- Cinematography: Maury Gertsman
- Edited by: Philip Cahn
- Production company: Universal Pictures
- Distributed by: Universal Pictures
- Release date: October 19, 1945
- Running time: 60 minutes
- Country: United States
- Language: English

Code of the Lawless is a 1945 American Western film directed by Wallace Fox and written by Patricia Harper. The film stars Kirby Grant, Fuzzy Knight, Poni Adams, Hugh Prosser, Barbara Sears and Edward Howard. The film was released on October 19, 1945, by Universal Pictures.

== Plot ==
A disreputable holding company has been robbing ranchers by imposing fraudulent taxes. The story's hero, Grant Carter (Kirby Grant) impersonates a long lost son, Chad Hiltonof, of the man who runs the company. Carter eventually reveals himself to be a U. S. Department of the Interior agent, and brings down the bad guys. In the end, he also captures the heart of a postmistress, Julie Randall (Jane Adams).

== Cast ==
- Kirby Grant as Grant Carter
- Fuzzy Knight as Ezzarius 'Bonanza' Featherstone
- Poni Adams as Julie Randall
- Hugh Prosser as Lester Ward
- Barbara Sears as Ruth Monroe
- Edward Howard as Bart Rogan
- Stanley Andrews as Chadwick Hilton Sr.
- Rune Hultman as Chadwick Hilton Jr.
