= Outlaw Gold =

1950 American western film

- Theatrical release poster
- Directed by: Wallace Fox
- Screenplay by: Jack Lewis
- Produced by: Vincent M. Fennelly
- Starring: Johnny Mack Brown; Jane Adams; Milburn Morante; Hugh Prosser; Marshall Reed; Myron Healey
- Cinematography: Gilbert Warrenton
- Edited by: Fred Maguire
- Production company: Monogram Pictures
- Distributed by: Monogram Pictures
- Release date: November 20, 1950
- Running time: 56 minutes
- Country: United States
- Language: English

Outlaw Gold is a 1950 American Western film directed by Wallace Fox, written by Jack Lewis and starring Johnny Mack Brown, Jane Adams, Milburn Morante, Hugh Prosser, Marshall Reed and Myron Healey. The film was released on November 20, 1950 by Monogram Pictures.

== Plot ==
U.S. Marshals Dave Willis and Sandy Barker, traveling incognito to investigate the robbery of a shipment of Mexican government gold, rescue Kathy Martin from an outlaw ambush after her father Joel Martin, publisher of the Latigo newspaper, has been wounded. Martin is later killed, and Bull Jackson, who claims to have witnessed the crime, accuses Dave of the murder.

== Cast ==
- Johnny Mack Brown as Dave Willis
- Jane Adams as Kathy Martin
- Milburn Morante as Sandy Barker
- Hugh Prosser as Roger Bigsby
- Marshall Reed as Bull Jackson
- Myron Healey as Sonny Lang
- Steve Clark as Joel Martin
- Bud Osborne as Sheriff Doss
- George DeNormand as Whitey
