= Lawless Breed =

1946 American western film

- Theatrical release poster
- Directed by: Wallace Fox
- Screenplay by: Robert Creighton Williams
- Produced by: Wallace Fox
- Starring: Kirby Grant; Fuzzy Knight; Poni Adams; Dick Curtis; Claudia Drake; Harry Brown; Charles King; Karl Hackett
- Cinematography: Maury Gertsman
- Edited by: Otto Ludwig
- Production company: Universal Pictures
- Distributed by: Universal Pictures
- Release date: August 14, 1946
- Running time: 58 minutes
- Country: United States
- Language: English

Lawless Breed is a 1946 American Western film directed by Wallace Fox and written by Robert Creighton Williams. The film stars Kirby Grant, Fuzzy Knight, Poni Adams, Dick Curtis, Claudia Drake, Harry Brown, Charles King and Karl Hackett. The film was released on August 14, 1946, by Universal Pictures.

== Cast ==
- Kirby Grant as Ted Everett
- Fuzzy Knight as Tumbleweed
- Poni Adams as Marjorie Bradley
- Dick Curtis as Bartley Mellon / Captain Isaac Mellon
- Claudia Drake as Cherie
- Harry Brown as Stanford Witherspoon
- Charles King as Tim Carson
- Karl Hackett as Sheriff Dan Bradley
- Hank Worden as The Deputy
