= Western Renegades =

1949 film by Wallace Fox

- Theatrical release poster
- Directed by: Wallace Fox
- Screenplay by: Adele Buffington
- Produced by: Eddie Davis
- Starring: Johnny Mack Brown; Max Terhune; Poni Adams; Hugh Prosser; Riley Hill; Marshall Reed
- Cinematography: Harry Neumann
- Edited by: John C. Fuller
- Production company: Monogram Pictures
- Distributed by: Monogram Pictures
- Release date: October 9, 1949
- Running time: 56 minutes
- Country: United States
- Language: English

Western Renegades is a 1949 American Western film directed by Wallace Fox and written by Adele Buffington. The film stars Johnny Mack Brown, Max Terhune, Poni Adams, Hugh Prosser, Riley Hill and Marshall Reed. The film was released on October 9, 1949, by Monogram Pictures.

== Cast ==
- Johnny Mack Brown as Johnny Mack Brown
- Max Terhune as Alibi
- Poni Adams as Judy Gordon
- Hugh Prosser as Jim Laren
- Riley Hill as Joe Gordon
- Marshall Reed as Frank
- Constance Worth as Ann Gordon
- Steve Clark as Dusty Dekker
- Terry Frost as Carl
- William Ruhl as Curly
- John Merton as Blacksmith
- Myron Healey as Gus
- Milburn Morante as Jenkins
- Marshall Bradford as Paul Gordon
