= Trail to Vengeance =

1945 film

- Theatrical release poster
- Directed by: Wallace Fox
- Screenplay by: Robert Creighton Williams
- Produced by: Wallace Fox
- Starring: Kirby Grant; Fuzzy Knight; Poni Adams; Tom Fadden; John Kelly; Frank Jaquet
- Cinematography: Maury Gertsman
- Edited by: Russell F. Schoengarth
- Production company: Universal Pictures
- Distributed by: Universal Pictures
- Release date: June 1, 1945
- Running time: 54 minutes
- Country: United States
- Language: English

Trail to Vengeance is a 1945 American Western film directed by Wallace Fox and written by Robert Creighton Williams. The film stars Kirby Grant, Fuzzy Knight, Poni Adams, Tom Fadden, John Kelly and Frank Jaquet. The film was released on June 1, 1945, by Universal Pictures.

== Cast ==
- Kirby Grant as Jeff Gordon
- Fuzzy Knight as Hungry Huggins
- Poni Adams as Dorothy Jackson
- Tom Fadden as Horace Glumm
- John Kelly as Bully
- Frank Jaquet as Foster Felton
- Stanley Andrews as Sheriff Morgan
- Walter Baldwin as Bart Jackson
- Beatrice Gray as Alice Gordon
