= Ralph Hodges (actor) =

American film actor

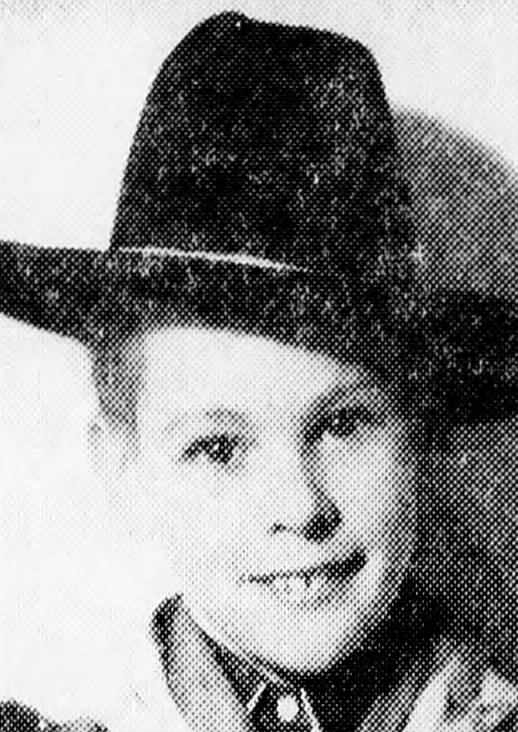
- Hodges in 1939
- Born: Ralph Stirling Hodges; January 13, 1929; San Bernardino, California, U.S.
- Died: June 8, 2014 (aged 85); Big Bear Lake, California, U.S.
- Occupation: Film actor

Ralph Stirling Hodges (January 13, 1929 – June 8, 2014) was an American film actor. He was best known for playing Jerry in the 1947 serial film The Sea Hound.

== Life and career ==
Hodges was born in San Bernardino, California. His father was a real estate salesman. He began his screen career in the late 1930s, appearing in the Our Gang shorts. In 1940, he appeared in the film Young People, and in 1941, he appeared in two Our Gang shorts.

Later in his career, in 1947, Hodges starred as Jerry in the serial film The Sea Hound, starring along with Buster Crabbe, Jimmy Lloyd, Pamela Blake and Spencer Chan, and in 1949, he starred as Frank Farrell, the young rancher in the serial film Bruce Gentry – Daredevil of the Skies, starring along with Tom Neal, Judy Clark, Forrest Taylor, Hugh Prosser and Tris Coffin. He appeared in films such as Two Tickets to Broadway, Two-Dollar Bettor, Stars in My Crown, A Yank in Korea, Mysterious Island (as Herbert Brown), Heading for Heaven and Cheaper by the Dozen.

Hodges retired from acting in 1951, last appearing in the film A Millionaire for Christy. After retiring from acting, he served as a sergeant in the United States Air Force, and worked as a producer of The LeGarde Twins's shows on KTLA.

== Death ==
Hodges died on June 8, 2014, at his home in Big Bear Lake, California, at the age of 85.
