= Marie McDonald =

American actress and singer (1923–1965)

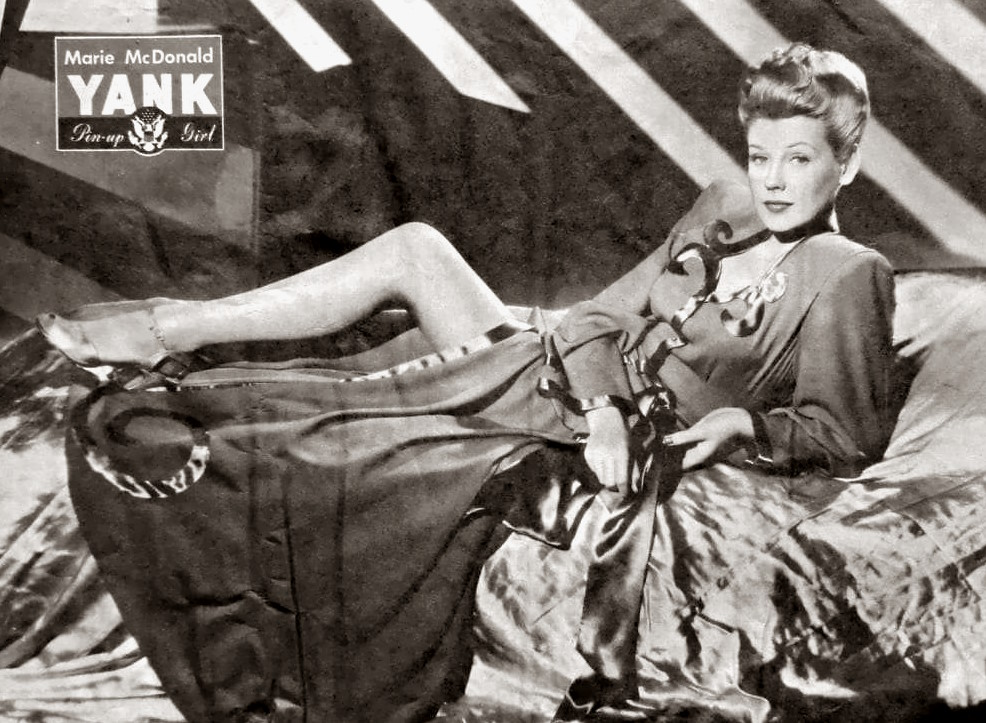
- Marie McDonald (September 8, 1944 issue of Yank magazine)
- Born: Cora Marie Frye; July 6, 1923; Burgin, Kentucky, U.S.
- Died: October 21, 1965 (aged 42); Hidden Hills, California, U.S.
- Resting place: Forest Lawn Memorial Park, Glendale
- Occupations: Actress, singer
- Spouses: Richard Allord (m. 1940; div. 1940) Victor Orsatti (m. 1943; div. 1947) Harry Karl (m. 1947; div. 1954) (m. 1955; div. 1958) Louis Bass (m. 1959; div. 1960) Edward F. Callahan (m. 1961; div. 1962) Donald F. Taylor (m. 1963–1965)
- Children: 3

Marie McDonald (born Cora Marie Frye, July 6, 1923 – October 21, 1965) was an American actress and singer. She started her career at a young age, participating in beauty pageants and gaining attention as "The Queen of Coney Island" and "Miss New York State." She ventured into show business by debuting in George White's Scandals of 1939 and landed roles in Broadway productions and Hollywood films. McDonald earned the nickname "The Body" for her attractive figure and became a popular pin-up girl during World War II.

Despite initial success, McDonald faced professional challenges and sought recognition for her acting and singing abilities. She switched studios, moving from Universal to Paramount and later to Metro-Goldwyn-Mayer and Columbia Pictures. Throughout her career, she also faced personal challenges, including multiple marriages and romances that kept her in the media spotlight. One of the most notable incidents in her life was a controversial kidnapping claim. McDonald reported being abducted by two men who demanded a ransom, but the police found inconsistencies in her story, leading to no conclusive evidence or charges.

In October 1965, her sixth husband, Donald F. Taylor, found her dead in their California home. The coroner attributed her death to "active drug intoxication due to multiple drugs", later determined to be accidental rather than suicide. Her three surviving children were raised by former husband Harry Karl and his wife Debbie Reynolds.

== Early life ==
Born in Burgin, Kentucky, McDonald was the daughter of Evertt "Ed" Frye and Marie Taboni (née McDonald) who performed in the Ziegfeld Follies. After her parents divorced, she eventually moved with her mother and stepfather to Yonkers, New York. At age 15, she began competing in numerous beauty pageants and was named "The Queen of Coney Island", "Miss Yonkers" and "Miss Loew's Paradise". At age 15, she dropped out of school and began modeling. In 1939, McDonald was named "Miss New York State". Later that same year, she debuted in George White's Scandals of 1939. The following year, at age 17, she landed a showgirl role in the Broadway production at the Earl Carroll Theatre titled Earl Carroll's Vanities.

Shortly thereafter, she moved to Hollywood hoping to develop a career in show business. She continued modeling and continued to work for the owner of the Broadway theatre as a showgirl at his Sunset Boulevard nightclub.

== Career ==
After auditioning for Tommy Dorsey in December 1940, she joined Dorsey & His Orchestra on his radio show and she later performed with other big bands. Dorsey suggested that she change her last name from Frye to her mother's maiden name McDonald, which she used professionally for the rest of her life. In 1942, she was put under contract by Universal for $75 per week and immediately appeared in several minor roles. That year, she appeared in three motion pictures, most notably, Pardon My Sarong, which earned her the nickname "The Body" for her shapely physique.

She was eventually dropped by Universal and signed with Paramount Pictures, earning $100 per week. While at Paramount, McDonald appeared in Lucky Jordan (1942). The following year, she was lent to Republic Pictures, where she co-starred in A Scream in the Dark, a "B" detective mystery that met with reasonable success. During World War II, McDonald became one of Hollywood's most popular pin-up girls and posed for the United States military magazine Yank. While she initially did not mind being called "The Body", McDonald soon grew tired of the nickname and focus on her body, and she expressed a desire to be known for her acting and singing skills.

She returned to Paramount where she appeared in supporting roles. In 1944, McDonald co-starred in Guest in the House, in which she received the first positive reviews in her career. Her next starring role came when she worked for independent producer Edward Small as the title character in the 1945 screwball comedy Getting Gertie's Garter. In 1947, she signed with Metro-Goldwyn-Mayer and co-starred with Gene Kelly in Living in a Big Way (1947). McDonald and Kelly did not get along while shooting, and the film was a financial failure. She bought out the rest of her contract at MGM and went to Columbia Pictures, where she appeared in a supporting role in Tell It to the Judge (1949).

In 1950, McDonald appeared in Once a Thief and Hit Parade of 1951, and she did not make a movie for the next eight years. For the remainder of the 1950s, she focused on theatre and music, recording The Body Sings, an LP for RCA Victor in 1957, backed by Hal Borne and His Orchestra, which consisted of 12 standard ballads. She also toured the world in a successful nightclub act. She returned to the screen in 1958 when she was cast as actress Lola Livingston in The Geisha Boy, a slapstick comedy with Jerry Lewis. In 1963, she made her last film appearance in Promises! Promises!, with Jayne Mansfield.

== Personal life ==
McDonald's seven marriages and various romances kept her in the media throughout her career. Her first marriage was to sportswriter Richard Allord in 1940. The marriage was annulled after three weeks. In January 1943, she married her agent Victor Orsatti in Reno, Nevada. They divorced in May 1947. While awaiting her divorce from Orsatti, McDonald had an affair with mobster Benjamin "Bugsy" Siegel. Siegel reportedly dumped McDonald because of her chronic tardiness.

McDonald's third and fourth marriages were to millionaire shoe manufacturer Harry Karl. They initially married in September 1947. After McDonald suffered several miscarriages, the couple adopted two children, Denice and Harrison. They separated in August 1954 and were divorced that November. Shortly thereafter, the couple announced that they would remarry. By January 1955 however, McDonald claimed that plans to remarry were "all off" because she discovered she was allergic to Karl. Despite this claim, McDonald and Karl remarried in Arizona in June 1955. They separated in March 1956 and, in May, Karl filed for divorce claiming that McDonald had beat him, causing him "grievous mental suffering". At the time of their separation, McDonald was pregnant with the couple's first biological child. Karl dropped the divorce suit in June. In July, McDonald filed for divorce from Karl and was granted an interlocutory divorce decree later that month but their divorce was never finalized. Their daughter Tina Marie was born in September 1956. During their separation, McDonald dated Michael Wilding. McDonald and Karl reconciled again in 1957 but separated again in December 1957. They divorced for good on April 16, 1958. Karl later married actress Debbie Reynolds.

During her final separation from Karl, McDonald began dating George Capri, one of the owners of the Flamingo Las Vegas. On June 12, 1958, Capri accompanied McDonald to the hospital after she accidentally overdosed on sleeping pills while the two were staying in Las Vegas. The following month, McDonald told the media that the two planned to marry after Capri's divorce. They broke up in September 1958.

On May 23, 1959, McDonald married television executive Louis Bass in Las Vegas. She filed for divorce after ten months, charging Bass with "mental cruelty". On August 6, 1961, she married banker and attorney Edward Callahan in Las Vegas. On September 17, 1962, Callahan filed suit in Los Angeles asking for a divorce from McDonald for mental cruelty or that the marriage be annulled due to fraud. Callahan claimed that the two had only lived together for two days because McDonald had no intention of making a home with him or having his children. Callahan also charged that McDonald would not convert to Catholicism. McDonald counter sued dismissing Callahan's claim, stating that they had lived together until September 7. She also claimed that Callahan had committed adultery and borrowed $2600 from her to finance their wedding and honeymoon which he did not repay. McDonald married for the seventh time in 1963 to her sixth and final husband, Donald Taylor. They met while she was appearing in Promises, Promises, the final film which Taylor produced. They remained married until McDonald's death.

=== Alleged kidnapping ===
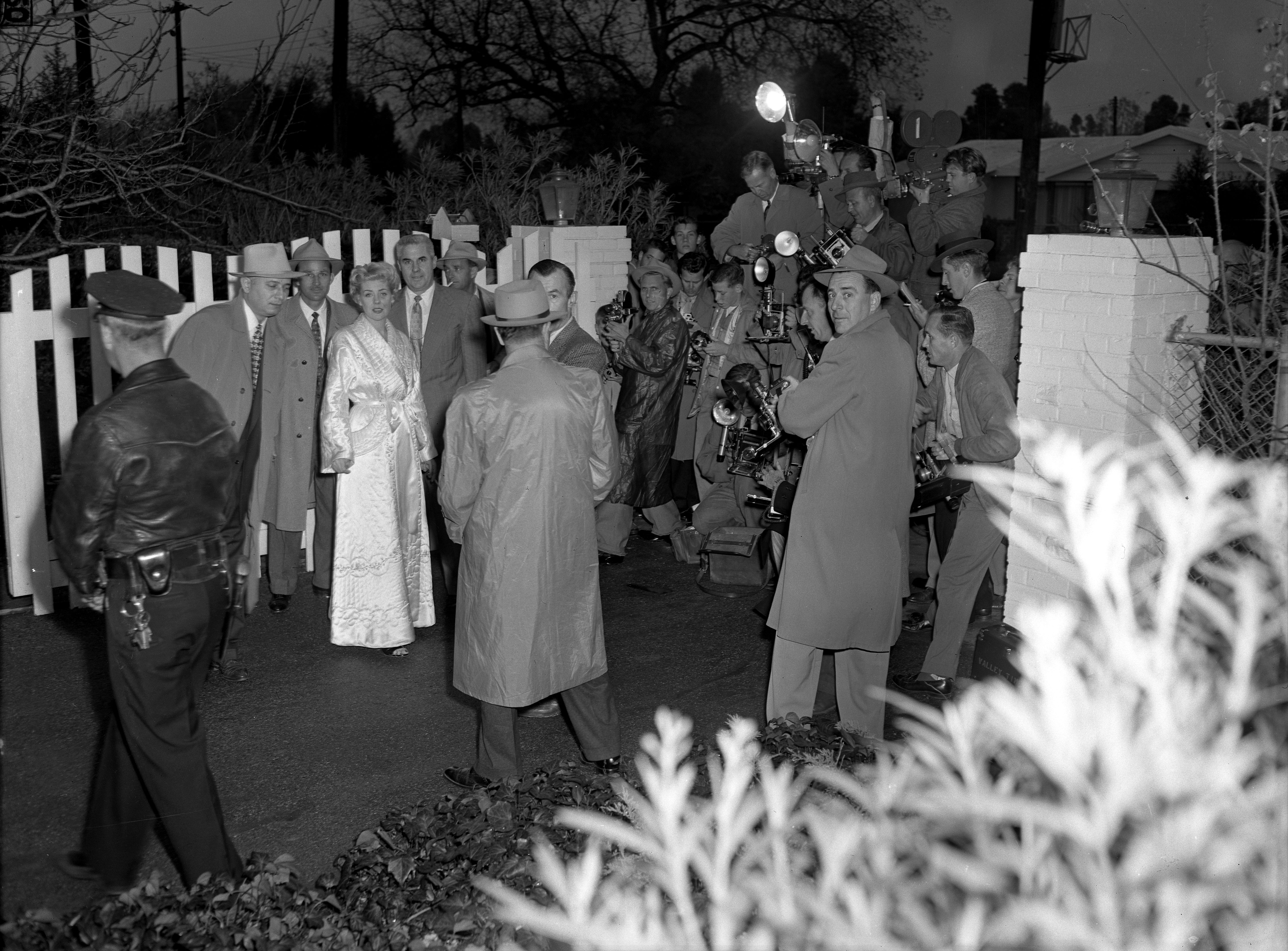
Marie McDonald re-enacts scene from her story of kidnapping at home in Encino, California

On January 4, 1957, McDonald's mother contacted the police, reporting that a nervous-sounding man had claimed to have abducted her daughter from her Los Angeles home in Woodland Hills, Los Angeles. McDonald's mother found a note in the mailbox of her daughter's house, instructing her not to involve the police. Later, McDonald's estranged husband, Harry Karl, also received a call from a male who sounded "like a nervous young kid", warning against contacting the authorities if he wanted to see her alive.

McDonald claimed that she had been taken to another location, where she managed to make three phone calls to her agent, Harold Plant, actor Michael Wilding (whom she was dating), and columnist Harrison Carroll. According to her account, two men demanded her ring and money and gave her a mysterious injection. She then claimed to have been blindfolded before being loaded into a car which was then driven for some time. Upon hearing news of her kidnapping on the radio, the abductors reportedly abandoned her on the side of the road.

The next day, a truck driver discovered McDonald on a highway near Indio, California. She recounted to police that two abductors had brandished a sawed-off gun with threats to shoot her children, taken some jewelry, and discussed a $30,000 ransom. She claimed they then forced her into their car, and she was blindfolded before being driven to a home. At the home, McDonald said the men forced her to swallow pills that made her drowsy before being able to make three phone calls when alone. After a medical examination, doubts arose about the veracity of McDonald's story, as her injuries, including two cracked teeth and bruises on her face, did not align with the assault she described.

Police immediately began to doubt McDonald's story, which changed several times. Those doubts deepened when police found suspicious evidence at her home, including newspapers used in the construction of the note in her fireplace. Additionally, a novel called The Fuzzy Pink Nightgown was discovered, mirroring the kidnapping story of a movie star who is kidnapped by two men. Although McDonald was asked to undergo a polygraph test, her lawyer advised against it. McDonald agreed to a re-enactment, which was filmed by police. Her estranged husband Harry Karl also doubted the story and claimed McDonald was "not a well woman". McDonald accused Karl of orchestrating the abduction for publicity purposes, but later admitted that she fabricated his alleged involvement.

After investigating the alleged kidnapping, police admitted that they could find no conclusive evidence that the event took place due to "perplexing discrepancies". On January 16, a grand jury convened to investigate the kidnapping. McDonald testified that her story changed frequently because she was in shock when she gave her initial statement and had been taking sedatives when she gave other statements. After weighing the evidence, the grand jury could not come up with any conclusive evidence to bring charges against anyone.

== Death ==
On October 21, 1965, McDonald's sixth husband, Donald F. Taylor, found her slumped over her dressing table in their home in Hidden Hills, California. On October 30, the coroner announced that McDonald's death was caused by "active drug intoxication due to multiple drugs" and was determined to be an accident or a suicide. The case was referred to a suicide team of psychologists and psychiatrists, which determined the final cause of her death. McDonald's funeral was held on October 23 at the Church of the Recessional at Forest Lawn Memorial Park, Glendale in Glendale, California. Her remains were interred in the Freedom Mausoleum at Forest Lawn Memorial Park, Glendale. In December 1965, the suicide team classified her death as "accidental" after determining that she likely did not choose to die by suicide.

Three months after McDonald's death, on January 3, 1966, her widower Donald F. Taylor died of an intentional overdose of Seconal. McDonald's three surviving children were raised by Harry Karl (her former husband) and his wife Debbie Reynolds. On May 4, 1967, McDonald's father Evertt "Ed" Frye died by a self-inflicted gunshot to the head in the garage of his home in New Smyrna Beach, Florida.

== Filmography ==
Year	Title	Role	Notes
1941	It Started with Eve	Cigarette girl	uncredited
1942	You're Telling Me	Girl	uncredited
1942	Pardon My Sarong	Ferna	
1942	Lucky Jordan	Pearl (Secretary)	
1943	Tornado	Diana Linden	
1943	A Scream in the Dark	Joan Allen	
1943	Riding High	bit part	uncredited alternative title: Melody Inn
1943	Caribbean Romance		alternative title: Musical Parade: Caribbean Romance
1944	Standing Room Only	Opal	uncredited
1944	I Love a Soldier	Gracie	
1944	Our Hearts Were Young and Gay	Blonde	uncredited
1944	Guest in the House	Miriam	alternative title: Satan in Skirts
1945	Getting Gertie's Garter	Gertie	
1945	It's a Pleasure	Gale Fletcher	
1947	Living in a Big Way	Margo Morgan	
1949	Tell It to the Judge	Ginger Simmons	
1950	Once a Thief	Flo	
1950	Hit Parade of 1951	Michele	
1954	The Danny Thomas Show		episode: "Pittsburgh"
1958	The Geisha Boy	Lola Livingston	
1959	The Red Skelton Show	Lil	episode: "Clem the Mailman"
1963	Promises! Promises!	Claire Banner	
