= Elizabeth Russell (actress) =

American actress (1916–2002)

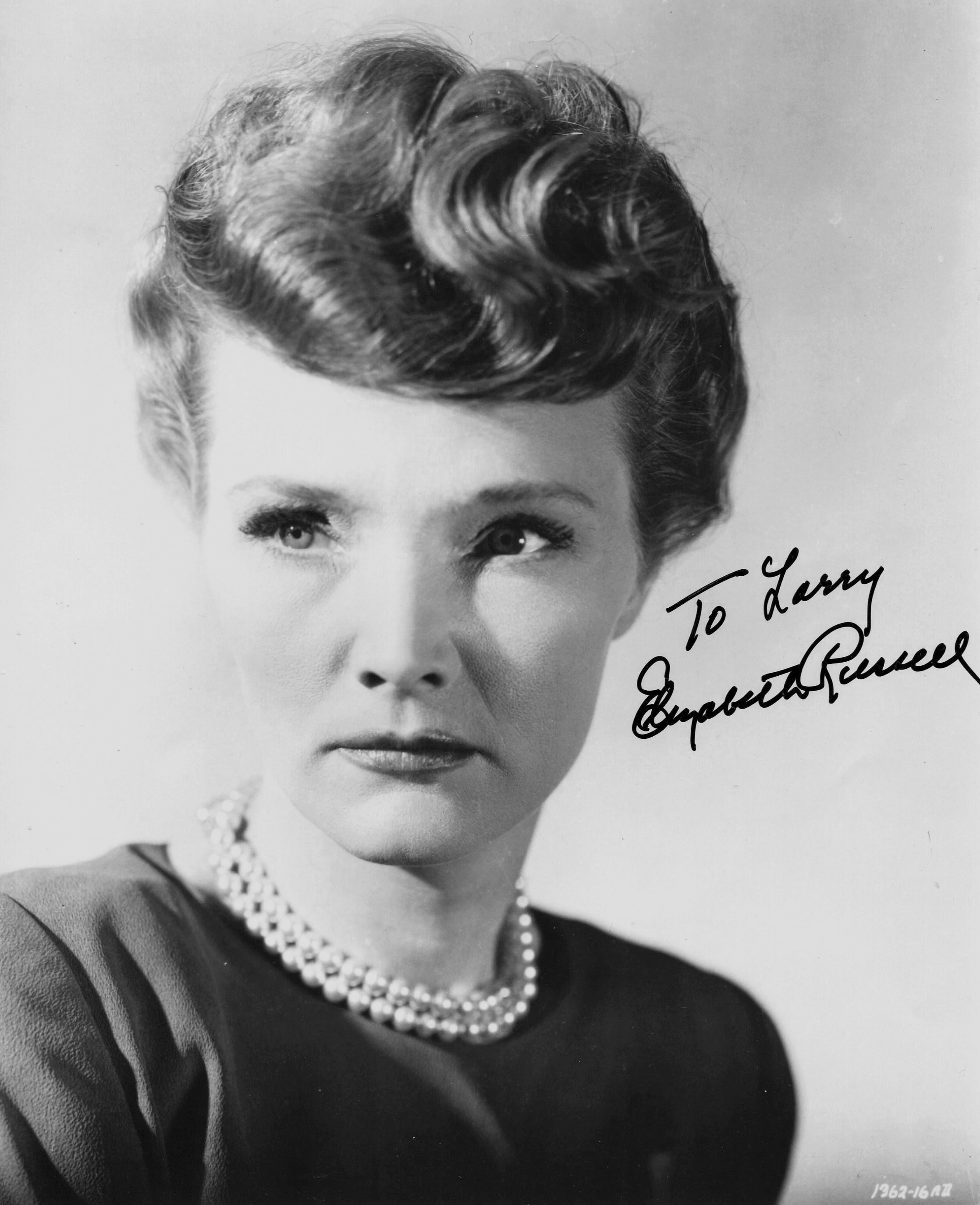
- Russell in the 1950s
- Born: August 2, 1916; Philadelphia, Pennsylvania, U.S.
- Died: May 4, 2002 (aged 85); Los Angeles, California, U.S.
- Occupation: Actress
- Years active: 1936–1960
- Spouse: John Russell (m. 1937; div. 1942)
- Children: 1

Elizabeth Russell (August 2, 1916 – May 4, 2002) was an American actress. Born in Philadelphia, Pennsylvania, she was best known for her roles in several of producer Val Lewton's low-budget horror films produced at RKO Pictures in the mid-1940s. She was the sister-in-law of Rosalind Russell.

== Career ==
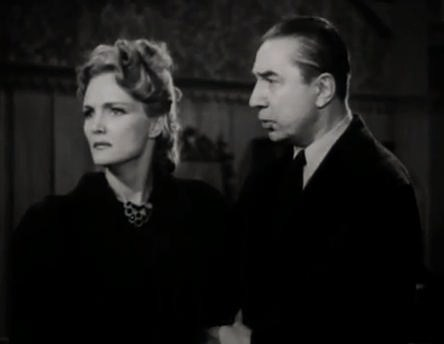
Elizabeth Russell and Béla Lugosi in The Corpse Vanishes (1942)

Russell worked as a photographer's model in New York City before she became an actress. When she was chosen for a part in Cat People (1942), Russell was a model who acted part-time. In his book Fearing the Dark: The Val Lewton Career, Edmund G. Bansak wrote, "Although lasting only moments, the economy of Russell's cameo is wondrous and it remains etched in viewers' memories long after the more essential concerns of plot and character have been all but forgotten."

== Personal life ==
Russell married advertising man John Russell in 1937, they had a young son. They divorced in 1942.

== Partial filmography ==
- Forgotten Faces (1936) - Girl
- Girl of the Ozarks (1936) - Gail Rogers
- My American Wife (1936) - Miss Van Dusen (uncredited)
- Lady Be Careful (1936) - Dancer (uncredited)
- Hideaway Girl (1936) - Cellette
- Forty Naughty Girls (1937) - Woman Watching Piper Enter Theater (uncredited)
- Miss Polly (1941) - Woman at Civic League Meeting (uncredited)
- A Date with the Falcon (1942) - Girl on Plane (uncredited)
- So's Your Aunt Emma (1942) - Zelda
- The Corpse Vanishes (1942) - Countess Lorenz
- Cat People (1942) - The Cat Woman (uncredited)
- The McGuerins from Brooklyn (1942) - Jealous Woman (uncredited)
- Stand by for Action (1942) - Expectant Mother (uncredited)
- She Has What It Takes (1943) - Chorus Girl (uncredited)
- Hitler's Madman (1943) - Maria Bartonek - Anton's Wife
- The Seventh Victim (1943) - Mimi (uncredited)
- A Scream in the Dark (1943) - Muriel
- The Uninvited (1944) - The Ghost of Mary Meredith (uncredited)
- Weird Woman (1944) - Evelyn Sawtelle
- The Curse of the Cat People (1944) - Barbara Farren
- Summer Storm (1944) - Dinner Guest Offended by Kuzma (uncredited)
- Youth Runs Wild (1944) - Mabel Taylor
- Keep Your Powder Dry (1945) - WAC Sergeant (uncredited)
- Our Vines Have Tender Grapes (1945) - Kola Hanson
- Adventure (1945) - Dame #1 (uncredited)
- Bedlam (1946) - Mistress Sims
- Wild Stallion (1952) - Dan's School Teacher (uncredited)
- Feudin' Fools (1952) - Ma Smith (uncredited)
- So Big (1953) - Elsie (uncredited)
- From the Terrace (1960) - Frolick's Woman (uncredited) (final film role)
