= The Crimson Canary =

1945 film directed by John Hoffman

- Theatrical release poster
- Directed by: John Hoffman
- Screenplay by: Henry Blankfort; Peggy Phillips
- Story by: Peggy Phillips
- Produced by: Henry Blankfort
- Starring: Noah Beery Jr. Lois Collier; John Litel; Steven Geray; Claudia Drake; Danny Morton
- Cinematography: Jerome Ash
- Edited by: Paul Landres
- Music by: Edgar Fairchild
- Production company: Universal Pictures
- Distributed by: Universal Pictures
- Release date: November 9, 1945
- Running time: 64 minutes
- Country: United States
- Language: English

The Crimson Canary is a 1945 American mystery film directed by John Hoffman and written by Henry Blankfort and Peggy Phillips. The film stars Noah Beery Jr., Lois Collier, John Litel, Steven Geray, Claudia Drake and Danny Morton. The film was released on November 9, 1945, by Universal Pictures.

== Cast ==
- Noah Beery Jr. as Danny Brooks
- Lois Collier as Jean Walker
- John Litel as Roger Quinn
- Steven Geray as Vic Miller
- Claudia Drake as Anita Lane
- Danny Morton as Johnny
- Jimmie Dodd as Chuck
- Steve Brodie as Hillary
- John Kellogg as Keys
- Arthur Space as Detective Carlyle
- Josh White as himself
- Coleman Hawkins as himself
- Oscar Pettiford as himself

== Critical reception ==
Writing in AllMovie, writer and film critic Hal Erickson described the film as "an offbeat murder mystery," and that "[although] the plot is nothing special, the wall-to-wall music and 'hip' ambience of Crimson Canary result in a better than average Universal 'B' [movie]". A review in TV Guide reported that "equal attention is paid to both suspects and their motives," and that "Cool tunes color this one hot."
