= A Scream in the Dark =

1943 film by George Sherman

- Theatrical release poster
- Directed by: George Sherman
- Screenplay by: Anthony Coldeway; Gerald Schnitzer
- Produced by: George Sherman
- Starring: Robert Lowery; Marie McDonald; Edward Brophy; Elizabeth Russell; Hobart Cavanaugh; Wally Vernon; Jack La Rue
- Cinematography: Reggie Lanning
- Edited by: Arthur Roberts
- Music by: Mort Glickman
- Production company: Republic Pictures
- Distributed by: Republic Pictures
- Release date: October 15, 1943
- Running time: 53 minutes
- Country: United States
- Language: English

A Scream in the Dark is an American comedy crime mystery directed by George Sherman and written by Anthony Coldeway and Gerald Schnitzer in 1943. The film stars Robert Lowery, Marie McDonald, Edward Brophy, Elizabeth Russell, Hobart Cavanaugh and Wally Vernon. The film was released on October 15, 1943, by Republic Pictures. It is based on the book "The Morgue is Always Open".

== Plot ==
Eddie and Mike, a pair of Brooklyn crooks, are running a detective agency as a scam and asking for payment in advance. They mainly offer to search for missing people and find evidence on people having extramarital affairs.

Mr Norton hires them to find his missing wife and pays $1000 upfront. He is murdered soon after leaving and finding their receipt, the police interview the pair.

Mr Lackey from Texas also uses their services. He is searching for his wife Muriel, whom he thinks is living as the wife of a Leo Stark. It turns out that she has been married multiple times. Lackey ends up dead, but Eddie and Mike decide it is not Muriel.

When they visit Stark's house, he tries to kill them with a poisoned umbrella, but ends up impaled on his own umbrella. Nevertheless, Muriel is not wholly innocent as she draws a gun on Eddie. After four murders, they are asked to find the chief's wife.

== Cast ==
- Robert Lowery as Mike Brooker
- Marie McDonald as Joan Allen
- Edward Brophy as Eddie Tough
- Elizabeth Russell as Muriel Kemp Norton, alias Muriel Carter Stark
- Hobart Cavanaugh as Leo Stark
- Wally Vernon as Klousky
- Jack La Rue as Det. Lt. Cross
- Frank Fenton as Sam 'Benny' Lackey
- Linda Brent as Stella
- William Haade as Gerald Messenger
- Arthur Loft as Mr Norton
- Kitty McHugh as Maisie
- Charles C. Wilson as City Editor
- Ethyl May Halls as the Landlady
- George Chandler as Reporter at the Morgue
- Jack Rice as the Desk Clerk
- Jack Raymond as the Cab Driver
