= The Corpse Vanishes =

1942 film by Wallace Fox

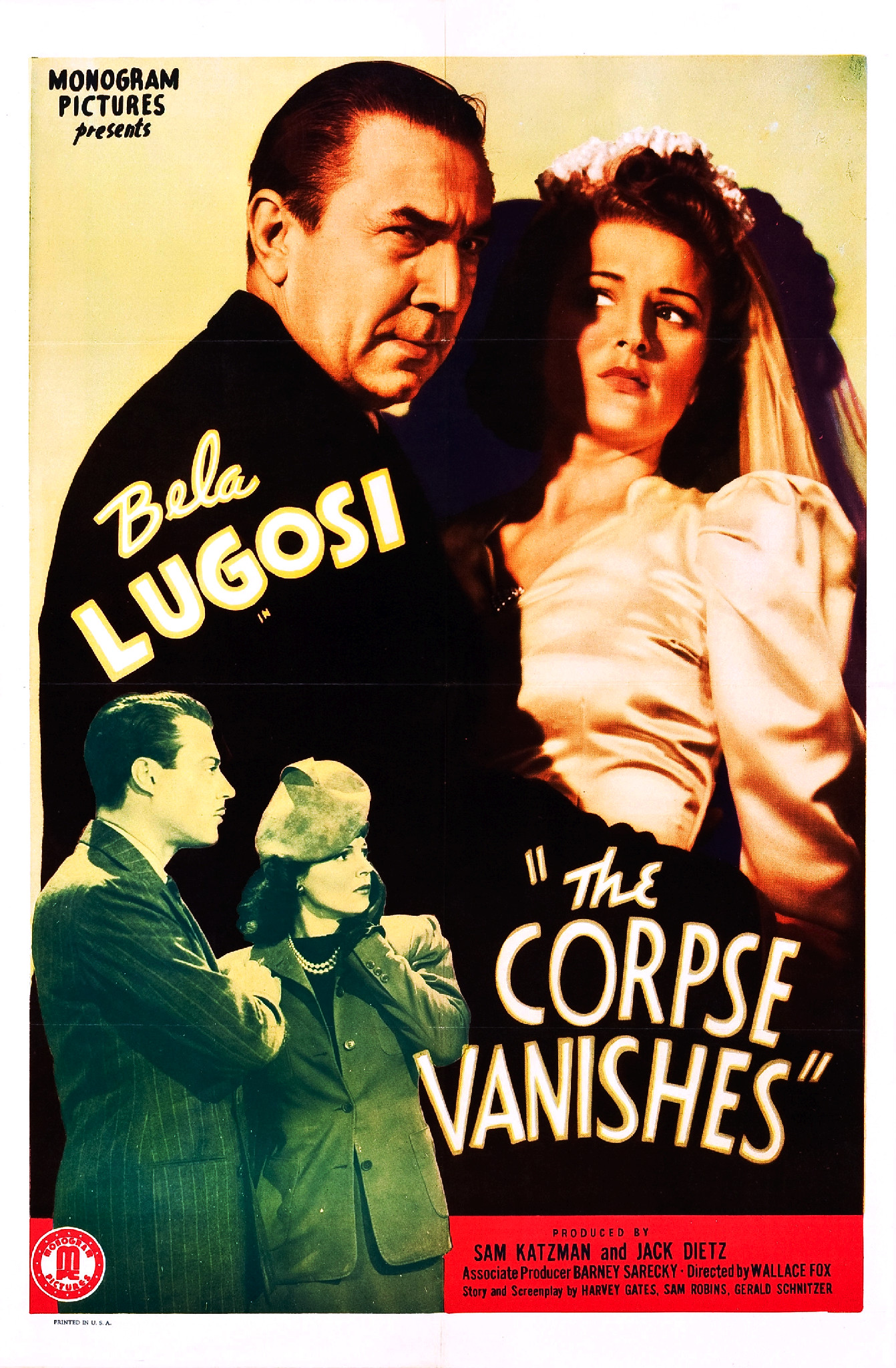
- Theatrical poster
- Directed by: Wallace Fox
- Screenplay by: Harvey Gates
- Story by: Sam Robins; Gerald Schnitzer
- Produced by: Sam Katzman; Jack Dietz
- Starring: Bela Lugosi
- Cinematography: Arthur Reed
- Edited by: Robert Golden
- Music by: Johnny Lange; Lew Porter
- Production company: Banner Productions
- Distributed by: Monogram Pictures Corporation
- Release date: May 8, 1942
- Running time: 64 minutes
- Country: United States
- Language: English

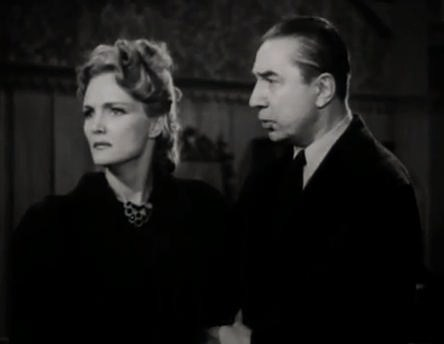
Elizabeth Russell and Béla Lugosi

The Corpse Vanishes is a 1942 American mystery horror film starring Bela Lugosi, directed by Wallace Fox, and written by Harvey Gates. Lugosi portrays Dr. Lorenz, a mad scientist who injects his aging wife Countess Lorenz (played by Elizabeth Russell) with fluids from virginal young brides in order to preserve her beauty. Luana Walters plays journalist Patricia Hunter and Tristram Coffin plays small-town doctor Foster, who investigate and solve the disappearances of the brides. The film was produced and distributed by Monogram Pictures and was reissued in 1949 by Favorite Films Corporation.

== Plot ==
On the day of Alice Wentworth's wedding, mad scientist Dr. Lorenz sends the young bride an unusual orchid, the scent of which places the young woman in a state of suspended animation resembling death. He then spirits her body away to the basement laboratory of his isolated mansion and extracts glandular fluid from behind her ears to inject into his vain and aged wife Countess Lorenz in order to renew her youth and beauty, as well as to save her from a slow and painful death. This is only the latest in a series of brides who appear to die at the altar and whose corpses subsequently vanish en route to the hospital or mortuary, and the police are thoroughly stymied.

A young journalist, Patricia Hunter, investigates the case and discovers it involves an unusual orchid. She is directed to Lorenz, a known expert on orchids, and visits his mansion where she meets with a chilly reception from the Countess. She is forced to spend the night when a storm washes out the bridge to town and discovers horror in the cellar beneath the Lorenz mansion: a crazed old woman Fagah and her two sons, one a sadistic dwarf named Toby and the other a hulking half-wit called Angel, who assist Lorenz in his activities; and a mausoleum in which he keeps the bodies of his bride-victims, not all of whom may be entirely dead yet.

Also staying the night is neighboring young doctor Foster, who attends to the Countess for other medical issues. When Patricia confides in him what she is investigating and what she has witnessed in the house, Foster agrees to help her. She leaves the next day for the city and, with her editor Keenan, develops a plan to trap Lorenz with a staged wedding and plenty of police protection but he outfoxes them, chloroforming Patricia and carrying her to his laboratory to now use her bodily fluids upon the Countess. However, during his escape, Toby is shot and captured by the police. Back at the mansion, Lorenz is stabbed by Fagah, who holds Lorenz responsible for her sons' deaths. He strangles her, then collapses and dies. Fagah rallies weakly and stabs the Countess to death before dying herself. The police and Foster, who has led them to the mansion, break in and Patricia is freed.

== Cast ==
- Bela Lugosi as Dr. Lorenz
- Luana Walters as Patricia Hunter
- Tristram Coffin as Dr. Foster
- Elizabeth Russell as Countess Lorenz
- Minerva Urecal as Fagah
- Angelo Rossitto as Toby
- Frank Moran as Angel
- Vince Barnett as Sandy
- Kenneth Harlan as Keenan
- George Eldredge as Mike
- Joan Barclay as Alice Wentworth
- Gwen Kenyon as Peggy

== Production ==
Filming started on March 13, 1942.

== Reception ==
Australian film critic Marcella Papandrea of The Super Network looked beyond the B-grade nature of The Corpse Vanishes and stated this about the film in her review: "There are some truly memorable moments in this film, as once again Bela Lugosi gives a great performance as a mad scientist, his scenes have a sense of unease and dread."

== Release ==
The film became available in many formats beginning on VHS in the mid 1990s, then on DVD after the year 2000 by many different studios, and most recently on Blu-ray in April, 2017 from the Retromedia Entertainment Group, Inc.

== In popular culture ==
Lugosi starred in another 1942 horror film, Bowery at Midnight. In a scene outside a cinema, an advertising poster for The Corpse Vanishes appears outside the doors and features Lugosi's image and name.

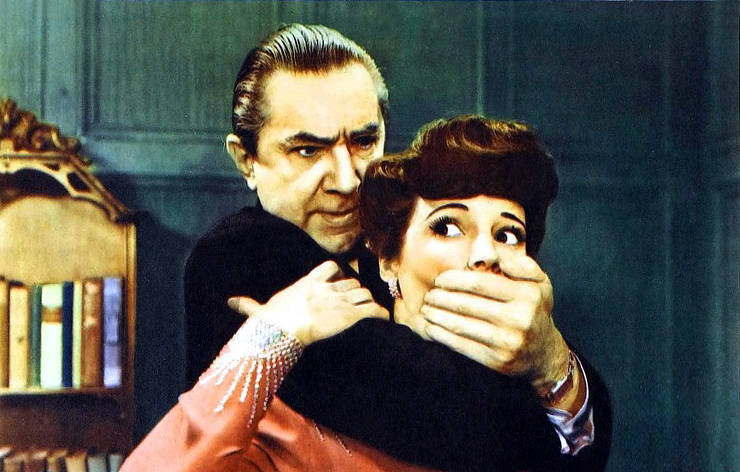
Colorized publicity shot

More recently, The Corpse Vanishes was featured in episode #105 of Mystery Science Theater 3000 (MST3K) along with Chapter 3 of Radar Men from the Moon, a Commando Cody serial. The episode debuted in December 1989 on the Comedy Channel. The series premise focused on an experiment to drive the protagonists mad by watching the worst movies possible and the film worked well enough for Tom Servo (Josh Weinstein) to short-circuit when questioned by Joel Robinson (Joel Hodgson) for a positive aspect from the film.

MST3K writer Mary Jo Pehl describes the film as "nonstop boredom and yawns aplenty" and a "low-key quasi-thriller." Like all other first season episodes, The Corpse Vanishes did not make the Top 100 list as voted upon by Season 11 Kickstarter backers. Writer Jim Vorel also took a dim view, ranking it #184 (out of 191 total MST3K episodes). "It's not the worst movie in the world, although it is very weird," Vorel says, remarking that the low energy level from the riffers makes this an MST3K episode likely to bore the audience.

The MST3K version of The Corpse Vanishes was released on July 20, 2010, by Shout Factory as part of the Mystery Science Theater Collection, Vol. XVI DVD set alongside Warrior of the Lost World (#501), Santa Claus (#521) and Night of the Blood Beast (#701).

== See also ==
- Béla Lugosi filmography
- List of films in the public domain in the United States
