= The Geisha Boy =

1958 film by Frank Tashlin

- Directed by: Frank Tashlin
- Written by: Frank Tashlin; Rudy Makoul
- Produced by: Jerry Lewis
- Starring: Jerry Lewis; Marie McDonald; Suzanne Pleshette
- Cinematography: Haskell Boggs
- Edited by: Alma Macrorie
- Music by: Walter Scharf
- Distributed by: Paramount Pictures
- Release date: December 19, 1958
- Running time: 99 minutes
- Language: English
- Box office: $3.2 million (est. US/ Canada rentals); 1,329,398 admissions (France)

The Geisha Boy is a 1958 American comedy film starring Jerry Lewis, distributed by Paramount Pictures. Filmed from June 16 to August 7, 1958, it had its first screening in New York City on December 19, 1958. This motion picture featured the film debut of Suzanne Pleshette.

== Plot ==
Gilbert "The Great" Wooley is a down-on-his-luck magician who has been invited to entertain GIs on a USO tour in Japan. However, even before his flight from Los Angeles has taken off the ground, he unwittingly – and with some participation of his pet, friend and co-star in the act, Harry the rabbit – incurs the wrath of the show's headliner, actress Lola Livingston, with a series of unfortunate accidents. Upon their arrival, as he tries to apologize to Lola, he causes her more embarrassment by tearing up her dress, knocking her down the gangway, and rolling her up in the red carpet to cover up her lack of proper attire.

An orphan, Mitsuo Watanabe, who attends the reception in the company of his aunt Kimi Sikita, an interpreter for the United Service Organizations, or USO, witnesses the spectacle and laughs for the first time since his parents died. When Kimi brings the boy to Gilbert to thank him, he and the boy become close. This, however, irritates the aunt's boyfriend Ichiyama, a Japanese baseball player; and his subsequent chase of Wooley, which culminates with Ichiyama's fall into a bathhouse pool that floods the street outside, almost motivates the furious USO commander Major Ridgley to revoke Wooley's entertainment-service status. Wooley's USO liaison Sergeant Pearson, who has fallen for him, is able to reverse that decision – though it is under the condition that Wooley perform for the American troops at the Korean frontlines. However, she becomes jealous of Gilbert's growing relationship with Kimi.

In time, Gilbert, Mitsuo, and Mitsuo's family become inseparable, but Wooley's failure as a troop entertainer makes Ridgley remand him back to the United States. Not wanting to disappoint Mitsuo by letting him find out that he has been a total flop, Gilbert tries to sneak away when it is time for him to return. Mitsuo follows him, and Gilbert is forced to pretend that he no longer cares for the boy, which makes him cry. However, Mitsuo still follows him to America by stowing away on the plane. Once in America, they are reunited, but Gilbert is accused of kidnapping Mitsuo, who is then returned to Japan. Wooley follows in the same way that Mitsuo did, but is "smarter" by hiding in a specially marked trunk. However, when the airliner lands, he cannot get out of the trunk, and the Sikitas have to rescue him from it. Wooley decides to stay and become a successful performer of magic in Japan.

The film ends with Harry the rabbit giving birth to a litter in mid-performance, as Gilbert hollers in shock and disbelief, "Hey, you're not a Harry; you're a Harriet!"

== Cast ==
- Jerry Lewis as Gilbert Wooley
- Marie McDonald as Lola Livingston
- Sessue Hayakawa as Mr. Sikita
- Barton MacLane as Major Ridgley
- Suzanne Pleshette as Sergeant Pearson
- Nobu McCarthy as Kimi Sikita
- Robert Hirano as Mitsuo Watanabe
- Ryuzo Demura as Ichiyama
- The Los Angeles Dodgers as Themselves

== Production ==
=== Background ===
Lewis had worked as an usher for Suzanne Pleshette's father Gene at the Paramount Theater. When she auditioned, Lewis phoned Gene in disbelief.

=== Locations ===
The opening scenes were filmed at Hollywood Burbank Airport in Burbank. UCLA's Humanities Building serves as the USO headquarters in Japan; its eastern steps is where Jerry Lewis speaks to the Japanese boy Mitsuo and Mitsuo's guardian.

== Reception ==
The Chicago Tribune wrote: “Jerry Lewis leans heavily on the antics of a rabbit and the appeal of a small boy in addition to his own familiar style of mugging, but the net results don’t add up to much. The script is obvious and contrived, varying between wild slapstick and concentrated corn....When I saw the film a few youngsters in the film giggled occasionally, but most of the adults were unresponsive. Mr. Lewis had better hire some script writers. His antics are now too well known to carry an entire picture.”

The New York Times thought the film similar to many that were then in the city's theaters: “these are all more or less in the nature of old fashioned flapdoodle films that are sweetly advertised for the kiddies but are generally anything but.”

As the Philadelphia Inquirer saw it, “The film is a free-for-all of sight gags, mishaps, sentiment, supposedly hilarious spoofs of other, better pictures and the sort of visual effects common to the old, sorely missed ‘Road’ comedies....Too little invention, too much effort on Lewis's part to make comedic hay out of slim material and the ill-advised take-off on ‘The Bridge on the River Kwai’...combine to make ‘The Geisha Boy’ hard going even for Lewis addicts....Process shots, bath and geisha houses, surround the players like a gaudy Technicolor cocoon. Unfortunately, no butterfly emerges to give the forced, foolish goings-on a lift.”

=== Popular culture references ===
- At one point in the film, Mitsuo and Wooley look at Mount Fuji in the distance. When the arc of stars as seen in the logo for Paramount Pictures (producers of the film) flashes momentarily, Wooley does a shocked double-take.
- Sessue Hayakawa, playing Mitsuo's grandfather, reenacts a scene that he performed in the 1957 film The Bridge on the River Kwai. His workers are building a small bridge in his garden that greatly resembles the one in that film and whistling the familiar "Colonel Bogey March." When Lewis stares in wonder at Hayakawa and the bridge he is building in his backyard, Hayakawa acknowledges that others have mistaken him for "the actor" and then says, "I was building bridges long before he was." This is followed by a brief clip of Alec Guinness from the film.
- The key players of the 1958 Los Angeles Dodgers (the team's first season in Los Angeles after leaving Brooklyn) are seen in an exhibition game against a Japanese professional team. Lewis names the players as he watches the games and is upset when the Japanese fans (including Mitsuo) won't cheer his favorite team.
- At the end of the movie, Lewis enacts the Looney Tunes outro, complete with its closing tune and line, "That's all, folks!", which is fitting since director Frank Tashlin had directed many Looney Tunes and Merrie Melodies shorts.

== Home media ==
The film was released on DVD and Blu-ray on February 14, 2012.

== See also ==
- List of American films of 1958
