= Jane Adams (actress, born 1918) =

American actress (1918–2014)

Poni Adams
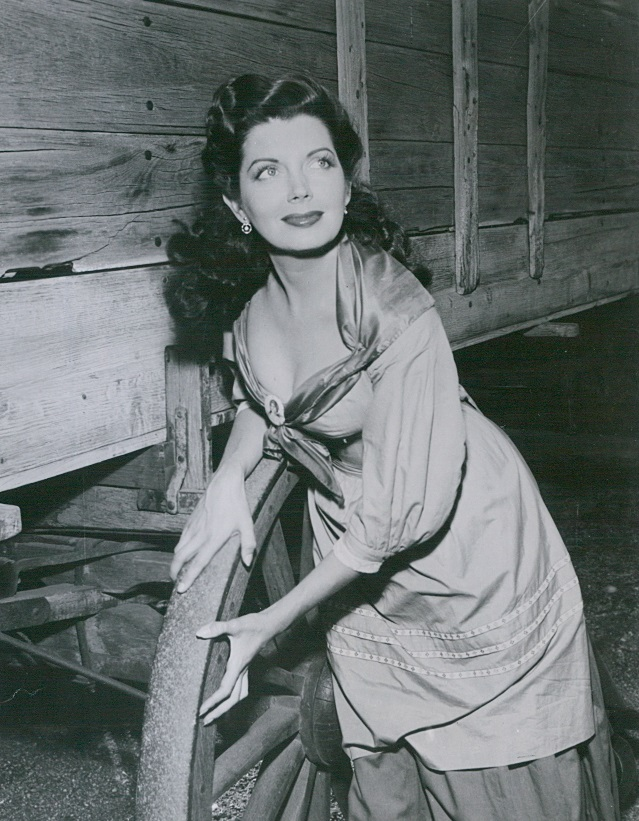
- Adams in 1952
- Born: Betty Jane Bierce; August 7, 1918; San Antonio, Texas, U.S.
- Died: May 21, 2014 (aged 95); Bellingham, Washington, U.S.
- Other names: Jane Adams; Betty Jane Turnage
- Education: Pasadena Playhouse
- Occupations: Actress; model
- Years active: 1942–1953
- Spouses: J.C.H. Smith (m. 1940; d. 1942); Thomas Turnage (m. 1945; died 2000)
- Children: 2

Betty Jane Bierce, better known by her stage name Jane "Poni" Adams (August 7, 1918 – May 21, 2014), was an American actress in radio, film, and television in the 1940s and 1950s.

== Early years ==
The daughter of Mr. and Mrs. Mason Bierce, Adams was born in San Antonio, Texas, but her family moved to California when she was two. During her high school years, she studied violin and drama, and she was selected to be a concert mistress of the all-city high school orchestra of Los Angeles. She received a full scholarship to Juilliard to study violin, which she turned down to spend four years studying at the Pasadena Playhouse.

== Acting career ==
After the Playhouse, she got her start on Lux Radio Theatre and then with the Harry Conover Modeling Agency. In the book Westerns Women: Interviews with 50 Leading Ladies of Movie and Television Westerns from the 1930s to the 1960s, Adams said: "I was given that name at the Harry Conover Modeling Agency. Why, I don't know!" Adams modeled for the National Tea Association and served as Dodge Girl for one year. She returned to using her real name in 1945.

Military personnel played a role in her change of names from Poni Adams to Jane Adams. A photograph printed in newspapers in 1946 carried the caption: "GI JANE — Jane Adams — formerly Poni Adams — holds some of 32,851 letters her press agent said came from GIs after she appealed for aid in choosing a new name."

Adams' first screen appearance was in So You Want to Give Up Smoking, a short film in 1942.

A photograph of her in Esquire led to Walter Wanger wanting her to do a screen test for Salome, Where She Danced (1945) that led to her being given a contract with Universal Pictures and a small role as a dancer in the film.

She may be best known for her role as Nina in House of Dracula (1945), but she also has the distinction of acting in early adaptations of both major DC Comics franchises: Batman, where she played Vicki Vale in the second Batman serial, Batman and Robin, and also a character in the first Superman television series.

== Personal life and death ==
On July 27, 1940, Adams married Ensign J. C. H. Smith, a United States Navy officer, in Norfolk, Virginia. He was declared dead on September 15, 1943, in Hawaii, after becoming missing in action during World War II when his ship sank a year earlier.

On July 14, 1945, in Hollywood, California, she married Thomas K. Turnage, an Army lieutenant who went on to become a decorated major general. Turnage served in the Korean War and earned the Distinguished Service Medal and Bronze Star. He later served as the last administrator of the Veterans Administration before the VA became a cabinet department during Ronald Reagan's presidential term. Adams and Turnage had two children.

On May 21, 2014, Adams died in Bellingham, Washington, at the age of 95. She was buried (as Betty Jane Turnage) beside her husband in Arlington National Cemetery.

== Filmography ==
=== Short subjects ===
- So You Want to Give Up Smoking (Joe McDoakes) (1942)

=== Feature films ===
- Salome, Where She Danced (1945) Salome Girl (as Poni Adams)
- Lady on a Train (1945) Circus Club Photographer (uncredited)
- Code of the Lawless (1945) Julie Randall (as Poni Adams)
- This Love of Ours (1945) Chorus Girl (uncredited)
- Trail to Vengeance (1945) Dorothy Jackson (as Poni Adams)
- House of Dracula (1945) Nina
- Smooth as Silk (1946) Susan Marlowe
- Night in Paradise (1946) Lotus (uncredited)
- The Runaround (1946) Miss Webster (uncredited)
- Rustler's Round-Up (1946) Josephine 'Jo' Fremont (as Poni Adams)
- Lawless Breed (1946) Marjorie Bradley
- Gunman's Code (1946) Laura Burton
- The Brute Man (1946) Helen Paige
- He Walked by Night (1948) Nurse Scanion (uncredited)
- Tarzan's Magic Fountain (1949) Villager (uncredited)
- Gun Law Justice (1949) Jane Darnton
- Angels in Disguise (1949) First Nurse
- Western Renegades (1949) Judy Gordon
- Master Minds (1949) Nancy Marlowe
- The Girl from San Lorenzo (1950) Nora Malloy
- Law of the Panhandle (1950) Margie Kendal
- Outlaw Gold (1950) Kathy Martin
- Street Bandits (1951) Jane Phillips

=== Serials ===
- Lost City of the Jungle (1946) Marjorie Elmore
- Batman and Robin (1949) Vicki Vale

=== TV Series ===
- Dangerous Assignment (1950) Maria Delgada
- The Cisco Kid (1950) Nora Malloy
- The Adventures of Kit Carson (1951)/(1952) Meg Owens/Marguerita Bolton
- The Adventures of Wild Bill Hickok (1951) Peggy
- Adventures of Superman (1953) Babette DuLoque
