= Two-Dollar Bettor =

1951 film by Edward L. Cahn

- Theatrical release poster
- Directed by: Edward L. Cahn
- Screenplay by: William Raynor
- Produced by: Edward L. Cahn
- Starring: Steve Brodie; Marie Windsor; John Litel
- Cinematography: Charles Van Enger
- Edited by: Sherman A. Rose
- Music by: Irving Gertz
- Production company: Jack Broder Productions Inc.
- Distributed by: Realart Pictures
- Release date: September 9, 1951
- Running time: 72 minutes
- Country: United States
- Language: English

Two-Dollar Bettor is a 1951 American film directed by Edward L. Cahn and starring Steve Brodie, Marie Windsor and John Litel.

== Plot ==
John Hewitt, a widower with two teenage daughters, places a two-dollar bet on a horse at the track and wins. Convinced that betting on horse racing means easy money, he becomes addicted and soon depletes his life savings and embezzles $14,000 in company funds to pay his bookie, whose attractive representative Mary Slate collects debts and appears to like John.

With an audit of the comptroller's office looming, John becomes desperate to replace the money and steals $2,000 more. He bets it on a 7:1 long shot and travels to New Orleans to watch the race. His horse appears to win, and John is overjoyed, but it is later disqualified for a violation and he returns home dejected.

Mary offers John a way out of his situation, but she is a con woman working with her husband Rick. Posing as Mary's brother, Rick convinces John to embezzle $20,000 more to place on a fixed race in New Orleans. However, the horse is a scratch and when John tries to find Mary and Rick to recover his money, he learns that Mary quit her job and Rick left his hotel. John realizes that he has been swindled and removes a gun from his desk.

John finds them at Mary's apartment just before they flee to Mexico. He draws his gun and demands the return of his money. Rick shoots John and he returns fire, killing Rick and Mary. John, seriously wounded, is brought to the home of Walter Kingsford, the head of his firm, where he admits that he stole $20,000 for the sake of his daughters and begs for mercy. Walter is sympathetic and lies to the police, telling them that John had been robbed while withdrawing funds from the vault and killed the two people in self-defense.

As John's daughter Dee is married and departs for her honeymoon, she takes comfort that her father would have been proud of her, indicating that he had died.

== Cast ==
- John Litel as John Hewitt
- Marie Windsor as Mary Slate
- Steve Brodie as Rick Bowers, alias Rick Slate
- Barbara Logan as Nancy Hewitt
- Robert Sherwood as Phillip Adams
- Barbara Bestar as Diane "Dee" Hewitt
- Walter Kingsford as Carleton P. Adams
- Don Shelton as George Irwin
- Kay Lavelle as Grandma Sarah Irwin
- Carl "Alfalfa" Switzer as Chuck Nordillnger
- Isabel Randolph as Margaret Adams
- Ralph Reed as Teddy Cosgrove Phelps
- Barbara Billingsley as Miss Pierson
- Ralph Hodges as Chester Mitchell
- Madelon Baker as Grace Shepard (as Madelon Mitchell)

== See also ==
- List of films about horse racing
