= Claudia Drake =

American actress and singer

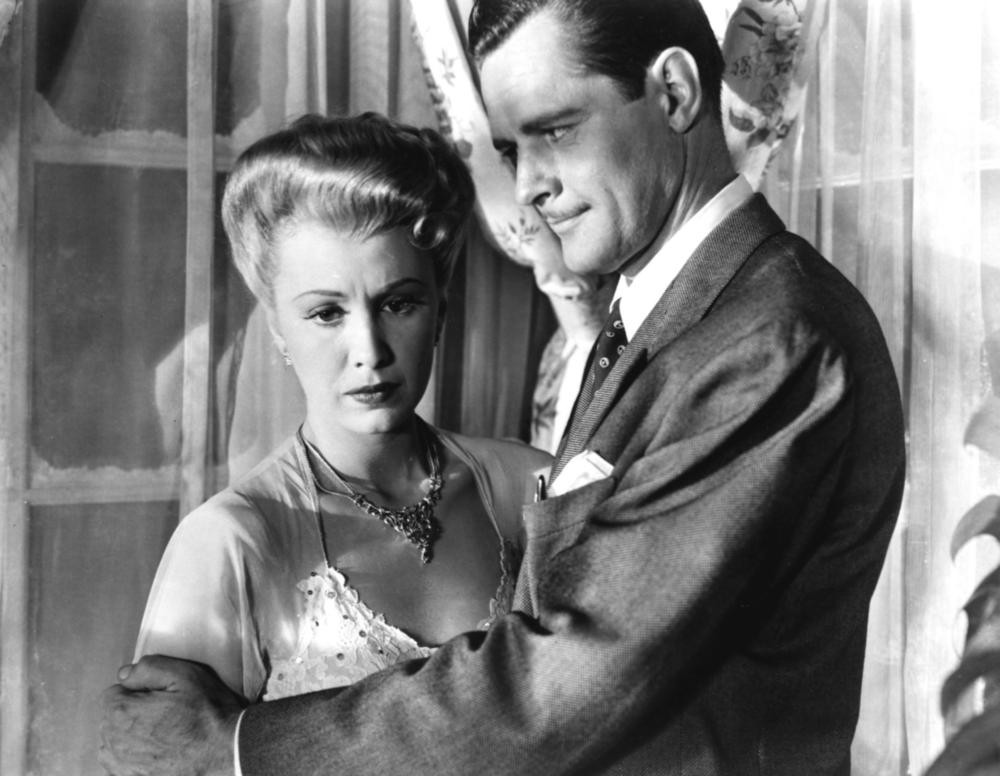
- Drake (left) with Donald Woods in Enemy of Women, 1944
- Born: Olga Gloria Fishbine; January 30, 1918; Los Angeles, California, U.S.
- Died: October 19, 1997 (aged 79); Los Angeles, California, U.S.
- Occupations: Actress, singer
- Years active: 1933 – 1958 (film)
- Known for: Detour
- Spouse: Salvador Paul Badalamenti (married 1942)
- Children: 2

Claudia Drake (born Olga Gloria Fishbine, January 30, 1918 – October 19, 1997) was an American actress and singer.

== Early years ==
Drake appeared in comedy films with Fatty Arbuckle and Ben Turpin when she was 3 years old. At age 5, she and her sister Ella (age 8) formed the La Marr sisters, and the duo performed in vaudeville. Drake described their routines as "a typical sister act — songs, dances, and funny sayings." When Drake was a child, Tom Mix was her family's neighbor. He taught her to shoot and ride.

When Drake was 12 years old, she was told that she was too old to continue performing. She went to school until she reached 16, when she decided to resume performing.

== Career ==
Misrepresenting her age as 18, Drake became a chorus girl at the Warner studio. She also performed swimming sequences for Ruby Keeler in Footlight Parade (1933). Another stint in vaudeville followed as she and Ella re-created their act and toured the United States. When Ella married, the sister act ended, and Drake worked solo for a while in vaudeville before she returned to films.

Busby Berkeley saw her singing in a casino and signed her to a contract with Warner Bros. Her roles in films included being leading lady in Hopalong Cassidy Westerns. Her work in Cassidy films varied from that of his previous leading ladies. Producer Harry Sherman said, "I've always wanted to turn loose on the screen a hard-ridin', hard-shootin' cowgirl"; Drake fulfilled that desire. No stunt doubles or off-camera tricks were used for her on-screen activities.

She appears in both leading and supporting roles in a variety of B movies, mostly Westerns, from the 1940s and 1950s. One of her more memorable supporting roles is the character Sue Harvey in the 1945 film noir Detour. During the 1950s she also performed in several American television series.

== Filmography ==
Year	Title	Role	Notes
1933	Footlight Parade	Chorus Girl	Uncredited
1941	No Greater Sin	Flo	Uncredited
1942	Flying with Music	Jill Parker	
1942	Reunion in France	Girl	Uncredited
1943	Border Patrol	Inez La Barca	
1943	False Colors	Faith Lawton	
1943	Campus Rhythm	Cynthia Walker	
1944	Enemy of Women	Maria Brandt	
1945	The Lady Confesses	Lucille Compton	
1945	Bedside Manner	Tanya Punchinskaya	
1945	Why Girls Leave Home	Marianna Mason	
1945	The Crimson Canary	Anita Lane	
1945	Detour	Sue Harvey	
1946	Live Wires	Jeanette	
1946	The Face of Marble	Elaine Randolph	
1946	The Gentleman from Texas	Kitty Malone	
1946	Lawless Breed	Cherie	
1946	Lone Star Moonlight	Mimi Carston	
1946	Renegade Girl	Mary Manson	
1947	The Return of Rin Tin Tin	Mrs. Graham	
1948	Lady at Midnight	Carolyn 'Sugar' Gold	
1948	Indian Agent	Torquoise	
1949	The Cowboy and the Indians	Lucy Broken Arm	
1952	The Pace That Thrills	Pearl	
1953	Northern Patrol	Oweena	
1954	Day of Triumph	Martha	Uncredited
1957	Calypso Joe	Astra Vargas	

== Bibliography ==
- Renzi, Thomas C. Screwball Comedy and Film Noir: Unexpected Connections. McFarland, 2012.
