= Bruce Gentry – Daredevil of the Skies =

1949 film by Spencer Gordon Bennet, Thomas Carr

- Directed by: Spencer Gordon Bennet; Thomas Carr
- Written by: Lewis Clay; George H. Plympton; Joseph F. Poland; Ray Bailey (character)
- Produced by: Sam Katzman
- Starring: Tom Neal; Judy Clark; Ralph Hodges; Forrest Taylor; Hugh Prosser; Tristram Coffin
- Cinematography: Ira H. Morgan
- Edited by: Dwight Caldwell; Earl Turner
- Music by: Mischa Bakaleinikoff
- Distributed by: Columbia Pictures
- Release date: February 10, 1949
- Running time: 15 chapters
- Country: United States
- Language: English

Bruce Gentry – Daredevil of the Skies is a 15-episode Columbia Pictures movie serial released in 1949 based on the Bruce Gentry comic strip created by Ray Bailey. It features the first cinematic appearance of a flying saucer, as the secret weapon of the villainous Recorder.

== Plot ==
Dr Benson (Forrest Taylor), a friend of charter pilot Bruce Gentry (Tom Neal), is kidnapped by the mysterious enemy agent, "the Recorder" who only issues orders through recordings. Benson is used to perfect the villain's flying saucers, launched and controlled by electronic means. Industrialist Paul Radcliffe (Hugh Prosser) hires Bruce to investigate the saucers as he thinks they may have a commercial use.

Necessary for the production of the flying saucers is a mineral called Platonite. The Recorder's only source, an abandoned mine on the land belonging to Jaunita (Judy Clark) and Frank Farrell (Ralph Hodges), has run dry and he needs to steal supplies from the US Government.

When Bruce closes in on The Recorder, he finds out that his prey is actually Dr. Benson. Krendon (Tristram Coffin), one of his henchmen, releases a deadly flying saucer on an attack against the Panama Canal. In his aircraft, Bruce intercepts the saucer, crashing into it, and escaping the resultant explosion by taking to his parachute. Back at The Recorder's headquarters, the saucer controls explode, killing all the enemy agents.

=== Cliffhangers ===
At the end of chapter 14, Gentry drives over a cliff on a motorbike. In the resolution at the beginning of chapter 15, Gentry is replaced by an animated sequence which shows him escaping death by use of a parachute hidden under his jacket. The cliffhangers, and their resolutions, in chapters one and 12 are almost identical.

== Cast ==
- Tom Neal as Bruce Gentry, "Daredevil of the Skies" and charter pilot
- Judy Clark as Juanita Farrell, Young rancher whom The Recorder is trying to chase away from her land
- Ralph Hodges as Frank Farrell, Young rancher whom The Recorder is trying to chase away from his land
- Forrest Taylor as Dr Alexander Benson/The Recorder
- Hugh Prosser as Paul Radcliffe, Industrialist who hires Bruce Gordon to investigate
- Tristram Coffin as Krendon, Lead henchman of The Recorder
- Jack Ingram as Allen
- Terry Frost as Chandler
- Eddie Parker as Gregg
- Charles King as Ivor
- Stephen Carr as Adrian Hill
- Dale Van Sickel as Gregory, US Government Agent

== Production ==
The flying disc is described by Harmon and Glut as "an embarrassingly bad animated cartoon drawn over the action scenes." Animation also appears in the resolution of a cliffhanger, in which an animated Gentry is used instead of a stuntman.

The flying disc, however, may be the first cinematic appearance of a flying saucer.

== Chapter titles ==
1. The Mysterious Disc
2. The Mine of Menace
3. Fiery Furnace
4. Grade Crossing
5. Danger Trail
6. A Fight for Life
7. A Flying Disc
8. Fate Takes the Wheel
9. Hazardous Heights
10. Over the Falls
11. Gentry at Bay
12. Parachute of Peril
13. Menace of the Mesa
14. Bruce's Strategy
15. The Final Disc

_{Source:}

== Critical reception ==
According to Harmon and Glut, Bruce Gentry was "one of Columbia's closest attempts at imitating the serials of Republic, a studio known for superbly staged action sequences" but it did not equal Republic's standards.

Film historian William Cline describes the serial as a "pretty good airplane adventure."

Preceded by Congo Bill (1948)	Columbia Serial; Bruce Gentry – Daredevil of the Skies (1949)	Succeeded by Batman and Robin (1949)
