= Spencer Chan =

American character actor

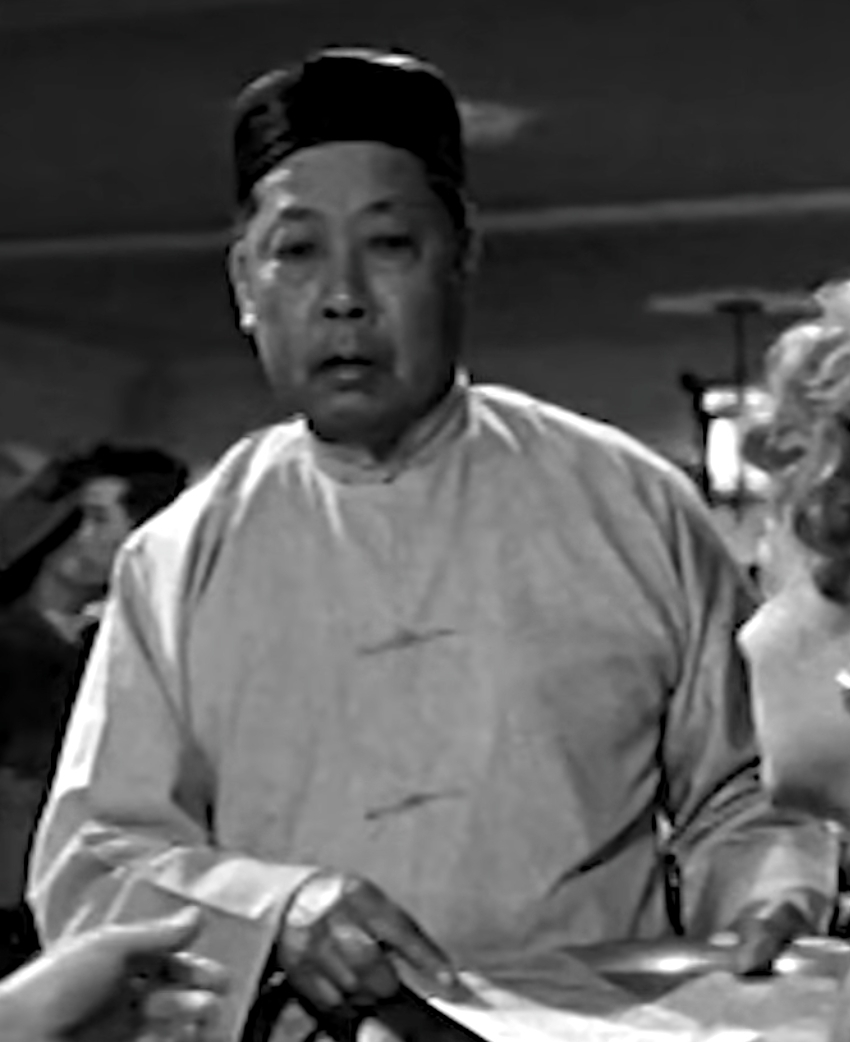
- Chan in Woman on the Run (1950)
- Born: March 28, 1892; Los Angeles, California, U.S.
- Died: January 12, 1988 (aged 95); Los Angeles, California, U.S.
- Resting place: Evergreen Cemetery
- Education: University of Southern California
- Occupation: Character actor
- Years active: 1936–1974

Spencer Chan (March 28, 1892 – January 12, 1988) was an American character actor of Chinese descent. He had a long career in numerous films.

== Life and career ==
Chan was born in Los Angeles, California, to Kui Sing Chan, a pastor and court interpreter, and Loy Yau. His parents were Chinese immigrants who owned a house in Los Angeles's Boyle Heights neighborhood. Chan graduated from the University of Southern California.

Chan began appearing in Hollywood films in the 1930s, and also worked as an interpreter and casting agent when a script called for Chinese actors. He was considered an "atmosphere" player, along with Willie Fung, Frank Chew, Richard Loo and others. In 1947, he starred as "Cookie" Kukai in the serial film The Sea Hound, starring along with Buster Crabbe, Jimmy Lloyd, Pamela Blake and Ralph Hodges.

== Death ==
Chan died on January 12, 1988 in Los Angeles, California, at the age of 95. He was buried at Evergreen Cemetery.

== Selected filmography ==
- Oh, Susanna! (1936) - Chinaman (uncredited)
- The General Died at Dawn (1936) - Killer (uncredited)
- Mad Holiday (1936) - Chinese Man (uncredited)
- Swing High, Swing Low (1937) - Cook (uncredited)
- Thank You, Mr. Moto (1937) - Chinese Freight Elevator Operator (uncredited)
- Trade Winds (1938) - Smoke Shop Customer (uncredited)
- The Man Who Came to Dinner (1942) - Chinese Guest (uncredited)
- The Tuttles of Tahiti (1942) - Chauffeur / Chinese Servant (uncredited)
- Wake Island (1942) - Japanese Captain (uncredited)
- Across the Pacific (1942) - Mitsuko - Chief Engineer
- Destination Unknown (1942) - Chinese Servant (uncredited)
- Casablanca (1942) - Guest at Rick's (uncredited)
- The Adventures of Smilin' Jack (1943, Serial) - Kushimi's Henchman [Chs. 12-13] (uncredited)
- Lady of Burlesque (1943) - Chinese Cook (uncredited)
- Behind the Rising Sun (1943) - Japanese Swordsman (uncredited)
- The Purple Heart (1944) - Naval Aide (uncredited)
- Dragon Seed (1944) - Farmer (uncredited)
- Thirty Seconds Over Tokyo (1944) - Townsman (uncredited)
- Back to Bataan (1945) - Japanese Man (uncredited)
- First Yank Into Tokyo (1945) - Minor Role (uncredited)
- Lost City of the Jungle (1946, Serial) - Tribal Elder Councilman [Ch. 11] (uncredited)
- Little Mister Jim (1946) - Chinese Clerk (uncredited)
- Canyon Passage (1946) - Miner (uncredited)
- That Brennan Girl (1946) - Chinese Headwaiter (uncredited)
- The Beginning or the End (1947) - Japanese Naval Officer (uncredited)
- Shoot to Kill (1947) - Waiter (uncredited)
- Singapore (1947) - Electrician (uncredited)
- The Sea Hound (1947, Serial) - 'Cookie' Kukai
- The Chinese Ring (1947) - Chinese Officer (uncredited)
- The Treasure of the Sierra Madre (1948) - Proprietor (uncredited)
- State Department: File 649 (1949) - Chinese Man (uncredited)
- Boston Blackie's Chinese Venture (1949) - Chinese Townsman (uncredited)
- The Stratton Story (1949) - Waiter (uncredited)
- We Were Strangers (1949) - Celebrant (uncredited)
- Lust for Gold (1949) - Townsman (uncredited)
- The Great Sinner (1949) - Gambler (uncredited)
- The Doctor and the Girl (1949) - Man in Clinic (uncredited)
- And Baby Makes Three (1949) - Sidewalk Extra in Chinatown (uncredited)
- Malaya (1949) - Chinese Shipmaster (uncredited)
- The Reformer and the Redhead (1950) - Chinese Laundryman (uncredited)
- Timber Fury (1950) - Chung
- A Lady Without Passport (1950) - Storekeeper (uncredited)
- The Breaking Point (1950) - 1st Chinese Immigrant (uncredited)
- Woman on the Run (1950) - Chinese Waiter (uncredited)
- The House on Telegraph Hill (1951) - Chinese Cook (uncredited)
- Inside the Walls of Folsom Prison (1951) - Wong - the Warden's Houseboy (uncredited)
- China Corsair (1951) - Gambling House Extra (uncredited)
- The Law and the Lady (1951) - Chinese Servant (uncredited)
- The Day the Earth Stood Still (1951) - Scientific Delegate (uncredited)
- Valley of Fire (1951) - Chinese Waiter (uncredited)
- Hong Kong (1952) - Vendor (uncredited)
- Macao (1952) - Hood (uncredited)
- Cripple Creek (1952) - Ah Fong (uncredited)
- Big Jim McLain (1952) - Nightclub Patron (uncredited)
- April in Paris (1952) - Delegate (uncredited)
- Forbidden (1953) - Dr. Chin (uncredited)
- World for Ransom (1954) - Club Patron (uncredited)
- A Star Is Born (1954) - Actor at Payroll Window (uncredited)
- This Island Earth (1955) - Dr. Hu Ling Tang (uncredited)
- Blood Alley (1955) - Villager (uncredited)
- Trial (1955) - Man at Defense Fund Rally (uncredited)
- The Revolt of Mamie Stover (1956) - Passerby on Street (uncredited)
- Flight to Hong Kong (1956) - Reporter (uncredited)
- Around the World in 80 Days (1956) - Minor Role (uncredited)
- Man of a Thousand Faces (1957) - Chinese Extra in Bullpen (uncredited)
- The Hunters (1958) - Bartender (uncredited)
- Hong Kong Confidential (1958) - Boat Passenger (uncredited)
- Never So Few (1959) - Merchant (uncredited)
- Ice Palace (1960) - Asian Worker (uncredited)
- Walk Like a Dragon (1960) - Man at Slave Auction (uncredited)
- Twenty Plus Two (1961) - Bartender (uncredited)
- Flower Drum Song (1961) - Doctor Chou (uncredited)
- Two Weeks in Another Town (1962) - Commuter at Airport (uncredited)
- The Manchurian Candidate (1962) - Foreign Official (uncredited)
- Once a Thief (1965) - Chinese Priest (uncredited)
- The Phynx (1970) - Meeting Guest (uncredited)
- One More Train to Rob (1971) - Townsman (uncredited)
- Herbie Rides Again (1974) - Man at Building Presentation (uncredited)
- Zandy's Bride (1974) - Chinese Vendor #2 (uncredited) (final film role)
