= Boss of Hangtown Mesa =

1942 film by Joseph H. Lewis

- Theatrical release poster
- Directed by: Joseph H. Lewis
- Screenplay by: Oliver Drake
- Produced by: Will Cowan
- Starring: Johnny Mack Brown; Fuzzy Knight; William Farnum; Rex Lease; Helen Deverell; Hugh Prosser
- Cinematography: Charles Van Enger
- Edited by: Maurice Wright
- Production company: Universal Pictures
- Distributed by: Universal Pictures
- Release date: August 21, 1942
- Running time: 58 minutes
- Country: United States
- Language: English

Boss of Hangtown Mesa is a 1942 American Western film directed by Joseph H. Lewis and written by Oliver Drake. The film stars Johnny Mack Brown, Fuzzy Knight, William Farnum, Rex Lease, Helen Deverell and Hugh Prosser. The film was released on August 21, 1942, by Universal Pictures.

== Plot ==
Judge Ezra Barnes, crooked-lawyer Clint Ranier and saloon-owner Flash Hollister control the town of Hangtown Mesa. The completion of the Rocky Mountain Telegraph Company will loosen and break their hold and they send for the Utah Kid to work for them against the telegraph company. On the way, the wanted Utah Kid encounters Steve Collins, an engineer heading for the company camp, and forces him to change clothes with him. Steve arrives in Hangtown and is mistaken for the Kid and jailed. The Judge also believes he is the man he sent for and has him released, and sent to the camp to work under Bert Lawler, company foreman who is actually working for the Judge and his gang. Playing along with them, Steve finds that the Kid has already been there, robbed the company safe and killed John Wilkins, uncle of Betty. Steve takes over the work and much to the surprise of Lawler, who still thinks he is the Utah Kid, manages to keep the work on the line progressing, aided by the traveling combination doctor/clothes salesman J. Wallington Dingle. In desperation, the gang tries a sneak attack on the camp.

== Cast ==
- Johnny Mack Brown as Steve Collins
- Fuzzy Knight as Dr. J. Wellington Dingle
- William Farnum as Judge Ezra Binns
- Rex Lease as Bert Lawler
- Helen Deverell as Betty Wilkins
- Hugh Prosser as Utah Kid
- Robert Barron as Flash Hollister
- Michael Vallon as Clint Rayner
- Henry Hall as John Wilkins
- Fred Kohler Jr. as Clem
- Nora Lou Martin as Work Camp Singer
