= Tell It to the Judge =

1949 film by Norman Foster

- Directed by: Norman Foster
- Written by: Devery Freeman (story); Roland Kibbee (add. dialogue)
- Screenplay by: Nat Perrin; Allan Scott
- Produced by: Buddy Adler
- Starring: Rosalind Russell; Robert Cummings; Gig Young
- Cinematography: Joseph Walker
- Edited by: Charles Nelson
- Music by: Werner R. Heymann
- Production company: Columbia Pictures
- Distributed by: Columbia Pictures
- Release date: November 18, 1949
- Running time: 87 minutes
- Country: United States
- Language: English

Tell It to the Judge is a 1949 American romantic comedy film directed by Norman Foster and starring Rosalind Russell as a divorcee who tries to get back her ex-husband, played by Robert Cummings.

== Plot ==
Appointed to be a federal judge, Marsha Meredith is questioned by a U.S. Senate committee, specifically about her divorce from lawyer Peter Webb.

She returns home to Palm Beach, Florida, where soon Peter shows up to depose showgirl Ginger Simmons for his defense of gangster George Ellerby. In a fit of jealousy at spotting her ex-husband with another woman, Marsha picks up Alexander Darvac in a bar and accompanies him to a gambling spot, which is raided.

Peter helps her escape notoriety. They steal a boat and hide out in a lighthouse, where they rekindle their romance. They remarry, but her grandfather, Judge Meredith, persuades them not to publicize that fact until the Senate confirms her appointment.

Ellerby jumps bail. Ginger tries to take Peter to him and they are seen again by Marsha, who is furious. She invents a story to reporters, who have heard rumors about Marsha's new marriage. She claims she wed a man named Roogle who died on their wedding night.

Marsha goes to her friend Kitty's cabin in the mountains to get away from the limelight. Peter, to get even, announces that Roogle is alive and on his way. Marsha ends up asking Darvac to pretend to be Roogle, but has to knock out Darvac when he tries to claim his privileges as her "husband."

In the end, after the confusion is sorted out, Marsha decides that if she has to choose, being married to Peter would make her happier than her career. She comes home and finds Ginger and Darvac knocked out in the closet.

== Cast ==
- Rosalind Russell as Marsha Meredith
- Robert Cummings as Peter B. Webb
- Gig Young as Alexander Darvac
- Marie McDonald as Ginger Simmons
- Harry Davenport as Judge MacKenzie Meredith
- Fay Baker as Valerie Hobson
- Katherine Warren as Kitty Lawton
- Douglass Dumbrille as George Ellerby
- Clem Bevans as Alonzo K. Roogle
- Grandon Rhodes as Ken Craig
- Louise Beavers as Cleo, Marsha's maid (uncredited)
- Thurston Hall as Sen. Caswell (uncredited)
- Larry Steers as Bar Patron (uncredited)
- Ben Welden as Augie (uncredited)

== Production ==
The title was originally What My Next Husband Will Be and was announced in June 1948 as a vehicle for Lucille Ball. By October the lead had gone to Rosalind Russell. In November Buddy Adler was attached to produce. Filming was to begin in January with John Lund discussed as co-star. Norman Foster signed to direct in December 1948. Then Fred MacMurray agreed to co star.

The title was changed to Tell it to the Judge in April 1949, by which time Bob Cummings signed to star. Cummings had a three-picture deal with Columbia.

Norman Foster directed the film which started 5 April. In May 1949 Charles Vidor was called in to direct re-takes.

== Reception ==
Variety called it "a flip farce".

Russell later said she would get the film "mixed up" with another comedy she made around this time, A Woman of Distinction, co-starring Ray Milland. She called Robert Cummings and Milland "first-class farceurs. They'll do anything for a laugh" but said "I could see the working-woman premise was wearing thin for postwar audiences." Variety later said the box office performance of both these films "proved weak". Variety listed the film as a box office disappointment.
