= Guest in the House =

1944 film by John Brahm

- Theatrical release poster
- Directed by: John Brahm; Lewis Milestone (uncredited)
- Screenplay by: Ketti Frings
- Story by: Katherine Albert
- Based on: the play Guest in the House by Hagar Wilde; Dale Eunson
- Produced by: Hunt Stromberg
- Starring: Anne Baxter; Ralph Bellamy; Aline MacMahon
- Cinematography: Lee Garmes
- Edited by: Walter Hannemann; James E. Newcom
- Music by: Werner Janssen
- Production company: Hunt Stromberg Productions
- Distributed by: United Artists
- Release date: December 8, 1944 (United States)
- Running time: 117 or 120 minutes
- Country: United States
- Language: English
- Budget: over $1 million
- Box office: $1,450,000

Guest in the House (re-release title Satan in Skirts) is a 1944 American film noir directed by John Brahm starring Anne Baxter and Ralph Bellamy.

Lewis Milestone began directing the film in April 1944, but was stricken with appendicitis in May 1944 and collapsed on the set. John Brahm then stepped in to direct.

== Plot ==
Martha Proctor believes something evil has come to her home. Her nephew Dr. Dan Proctor arrives with his betrothed, Evelyn Heath, who is a frail invalid. Evelyn is introduced to Aunt Martha as well as Dan's older brother, Douglas, an illustrator, along with Douglas's wife Ann and his model, Miriam.

The women sympathize with Evelyn, knowing of the hard life she has had. Evelyn has bouts of hysteria, involving her fear of birds, and also keeps a secret diary in which she mocks Aunt Martha for her spinsterhood status, scorns her fiancé Dan, and expresses a desire for Douglas instead.

While plotting to seduce Douglas, and accusing Dan of jealousy to make him leave, Evelyn sets out to rid the house of Miriam, whom she sees as a rival. Her gossip succeeds in getting back to Ann, and turning everyone's suspicions to Miriam, who departs.

Douglas then quarrels with Ann, driven apart by Evelyn's diabolical schemes. Ann and her child leave to catch the train. Evelyn destroys the goodbye note Ann has written to him.

Evelyn believes she has finally secured Douglas's love, but when Douglas realizes he's been manipulated, he runs to stop Ann. They return to the house and confront Evelyn, telling her that if she ends her marriage plans with Dan, they will agree to send her to an asylum for care. Instead, Evelyn fools Dan into returning home to marry her right away.

As Ann and Douglas take Dan aside to try to persuade him from marrying Evelyn, Martha plays on Evelyn's terror of birds, and pushes her into hysteria. Evelyn flees from the house, screaming, and plunges to her death over a cliff.

== Cast ==
- Anne Baxter as Evelyn Heath
- Ralph Bellamy as Douglas Proctor
- Aline MacMahon as Aunt Martha
- Ruth Warrick as Ann Proctor
- Scott McKay as Dr. Dan Proctor
- Marie McDonald as Miriam
- Jerome Cowan as Mr. Ernest Hackett
- Margaret Hamilton as Hilda, the Maid
- Percy Kilbride as John, the Butler
- Connie Laird as Lee Proctor

== Reception ==
The film earned a profit of $50,000.

=== Critical response ===
Bosley Crowther, the film critic for The New York Times, gave the film a mixed review when it first opened, writing, "For a more cracked and incredible tale than this quaint one of a mischief-making female has not lately disturbed the screen. As a play by Hagar Wilde and Dale Eunson, it had a moderate run, we understand, but as a film it is openly in peril of being laughed into a quick decline. The fault is as much in the story as it is in the handling by all concerned, for the story is cheaply synthetic and about as logical as a crooner's song...Nor is any help rendered by Anne Baxter, who plays the wrecker with so much coyness that anyone, shy of a blind man, could see that she was up to tricks. And Ralph Bellamy is equally ridiculous as a middle-aged Byronic beau who tries to be boyish and amorous and also solemn and wise. Miss MacMahon remains in the background, which is a happy place for one in this film, while Ruth Warrick, Scott McKay and Jerome Cowan get entwined with the torturings up front. Mr. Stromberg is an eminent producer, but his grip certainly slipped on this job."

=== Accolades ===
Nominations

- Academy Awards: Best Music, Scoring of a Dramatic or Comedy Picture; Werner Janssen; 1945.

== See also ==
- List of American films of 1944
