= The Cowboy and the Indians =

1949 film by John English

- Theatrical release poster
- Directed by: John English
- Written by: Dwight Cummins; Dorothy Yost
- Produced by: Armand Schaefer
- Starring: Gene Autry; Sheila Ryan; Frank Richards; Hank Patterson; Jay Silverheels; Claudia Drake
- Cinematography: William Bradford
- Edited by: Henry Batista
- Production company: Gene Autry Productions
- Distributed by: Columbia Pictures
- Release date: September 15, 1949
- Running time: 68 minutes
- Country: United States
- Language: English

The Cowboy and the Indians is a 1949 American Western film directed by John English and written by Dwight Cummins and Dorothy Yost. The film stars Gene Autry, Sheila Ryan, Frank Richards, Hank Patterson, Jay Silverheels and Claudia Drake. The film was released on September 15, 1949, by Columbia Pictures.

== Plot ==
Rancher Gene Autry is affected by the plight of reservation Indians suffering from malnutrition and being exploited by an Indian Agency trading post operator.

== Cast ==
- Gene Autry as Gene Autry
- Sheila Ryan as Dr. Nan Palmer
- Frank Richards as Smiley Martin
- Hank Patterson as Tom Garber
- Jay Silverheels as Lakohna
- Claudia Drake as Lucy Broken Arm
- Georgie Nokes as Rona
- Charles Stevens as Broken Arm
- Alex Frazer as Fred Bradley
- Clayton Moore as Luke
- Frank Lackteen as Blue Eagle
- Chief Yowlachie as Chief Long Arrow
- Lee Roberts as Joe
- Nolan Leary as Sheriff Don Payne
- Maudie Prickett as Miss Summers
- Harry Mackin as Bob Collins
- Charles Quigley as Henderson
- Gilbert Alonzo as Lucy's son
- Roy Gordon as Congressman Lawrence
- Champion as Champ
