= Robert Joyce Tasker =

American criminal and author (1903–1944)

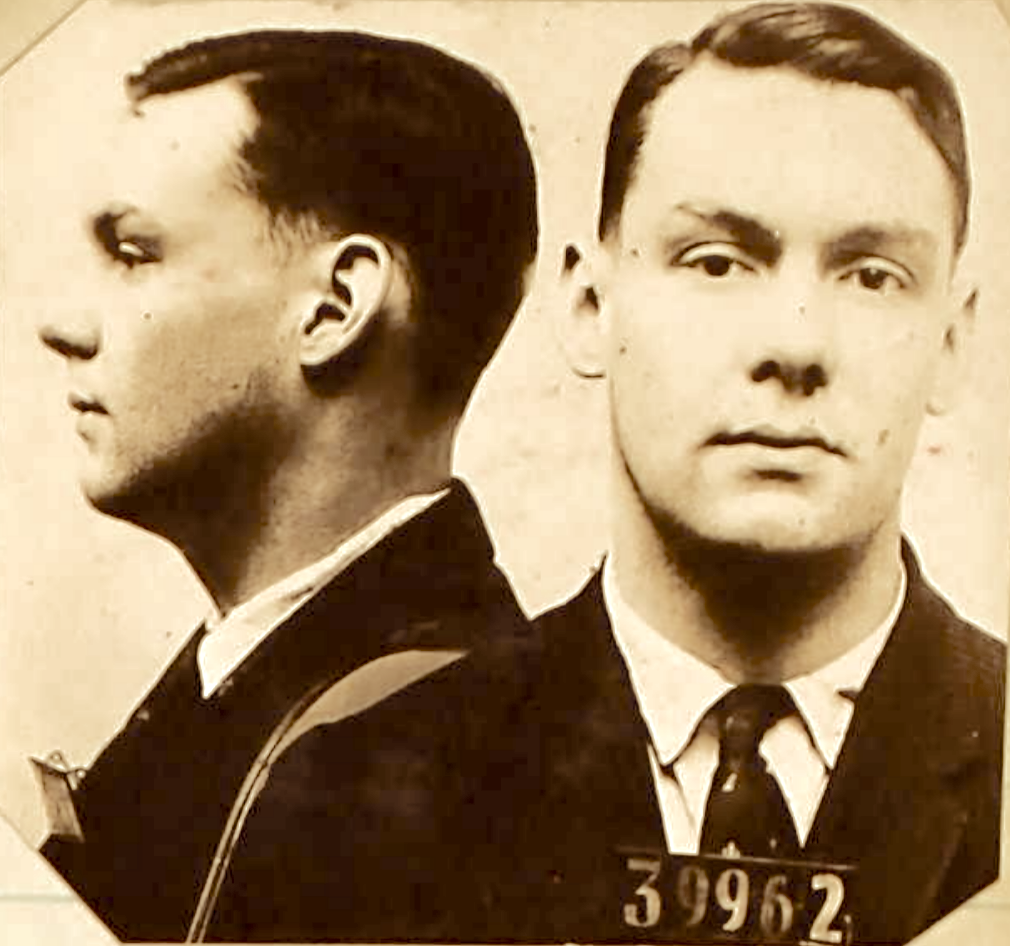
Intake photograph, San Quentin State Prison, 1924

Robert Joyce Tasker (November 13, 1903 – December 7, 1944) was an American criminal, author and Hollywood screenwriter. Mentored by writers such as H. L. Mencken while an inmate at San Quentin Prison, he became the editor of the prison newspaper, which became known as a literary outlet for other prison writers. He was described as "the first author to have a book published while still an inmate of a United States penal Institution." After his release, he wrote for films produced in Hollywood and Mexico, and gained attention in Los Angeles society circles.

== Biography ==
Tasker was born in Albee, South Dakota, to Arthur and Ellen (Gold) Tasker. In April 1924, after his family had moved to Oregon, he began robbing restaurants in the Oakland, California, area. Initially called the "Coffee Bandit" as "he always drank coffee and ate pastry in cafes he intended to rob", after his arrest he was dubbed the "Love Bandit" for his claim to have been spurred to crime by infatuation with his childhood sweetheart. After attempting to hold up a dance hall, he was finally captured and convicted of robbery; he was sentenced to five years to life in San Quentin Prison in September of that year.

While in prison, Tasker was assigned to the print shop, leading to him joining a writing class; his short stories were published in the prison newspaper, the San Quentin Bulletin, and he soon became its editor. His writing was brought to the attention of H. L. Mencken, who mentored him and other incarcerated writers. The prison newspaper grew in popularity, triggering a spate of inmate prison writing, to the point that authorities were overwhelmed by the activity surrounding the paper, and eventually barred Tasker and fellow inmate Ernest Booth from submitting their works to outside publications. Even so, while Tasker was still in prison, Grimhaven, his novel about prison life, was published, which again raised controversy as to whether prisoners should be allowed to be paid royalties.

He was paroled in December 1929. After his release, he became a Hollywood screenwriter and "gossip column fixture". He married and divorced actress Lucille Morrison, and then married actress Raquel Echeverria in 1937. He later married Gladys Flores, a granddaughter of a former president of Costa Rica. He and Gladys moved to Mexico City in 1942.

His brother Homer G. Tasker, then a student at UC Berkeley, was reported to have helped his brother in his defense; he later became an Academy-Award-nominated sound engineer.

== Death ==
Tasker died in Mexico City on December 7, 1944, of an overdose of sleeping pills.

== Works ==
=== Film ===
- Miss Pinkerton (1932)
- Doctor X (1932)
- Hell's Highway (1932)
- Secrets of the French Police (1932)
- A Notorious Gentleman (1935)
- Here Comes Trouble (1936)
- Girl of the Ozarks (1936)
- The Accusing Finger (1937)
- John Meade's Woman (1937)
- San Quentin (1937)
- Back Door to Heaven (1939)
- The Secret Seven (1940)
- The Affairs of Jimmy Valentine (1942)
- Home in Wyomin' (1942)
- Secrets of the Underground (1942)
- Les Misérables (1943)
- La dama de las camelias (1944)
- Dillinger (1945)

=== Books ===
- Tasker, Robert Joyce (1928). Grimhaven. Alfred A Knopf. ASIN B0021RIE6C.

=== Stories ===
Published in American Mercury:

- "The First Day" (1927)
- "A Man is Hanged" (1927)

== See also ==
- American prison literature
