= Frank Richards (actor) =

American actor (1909–1992)

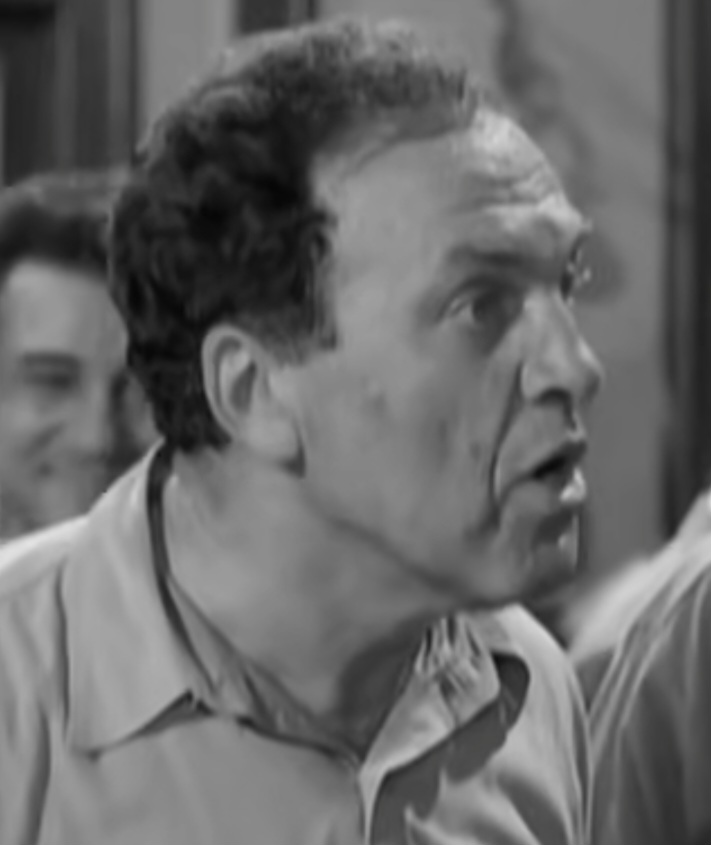
- Richards in an episode of One Step Beyond (1959)
- Born: September 15, 1909; New York City, U.S.
- Died: April 15, 1992 (aged 82); Las Vegas, Nevada, U.S.
- Resting place: Palm Memorial Park, Las Vegas, Nevada
- Occupation: Actor
- Years active: 1940–1984
- Spouse: Marion Richards (1915–1994)

Frank Richards (September 15, 1909 – April 15, 1992) was an American character actor, typically portraying a hoodlum or thug with a menacing appearance.

== Biography ==
Richards was born in New York City and raised in Fall River, Massachusetts.

Richards began acting in stock theater in Cape Cod while he worked 16 hours a day as a driver of a fruit truck. He continued his stock acting for eight years. He acted on Broadway in The Wanhope Building (1947), Embezzled Heaven (1944), The World We Make (1939), and Brown Danube (1939).

After serving in the military during World War II, Richards studied dialects, diction, and speech in New York, in addition to working in radio and television.

He appeared in 150 films and televisions shows from 1940 into the mid 1980s. He appeared in three episodes of Adventures of Superman, including 1952's "Night of Terror", in which he accidentally knocked out Phyllis Coates during a fight scene. He also appeared in a 1953 episode of The Lone Ranger. His first stage appearance was in 1938 and his last film was John Cassavetes' A Woman Under the Influence in 1974.

== Death ==
On April 15, 1992, Richards died in Las Vegas, Nevada. He is interred at Palm Memorial Park in Las Vegas.

== Selected filmography ==
- Before I Hang (1940) - Otto Kron, Convict
- Arizona (1940) - Dugan (uncredited)
- Tall, Dark and Handsome (1941) - Mobster (uncredited)
- Sky Raiders (1941, Serial) - Murdock, Henchman [Ch. 8] (uncredited)
- Hold That Ghost (1941) - Gunman (uncredited)
- Public Enemies (1941) - Shelby
- The Corsican Brothers (1941) - Colonna's Henchman (uncredited)
- Reap the Wild Wind (1942) - Cutler Man in Barrel Room (uncredited)
- Alias Boston Blackie (1942) - Mack, Prisoner Next to Joe (uncredited)
- Sunday Punch (1942) - Bystander (uncredited)
- Cairo (1942) - Alfred
- A Man's World (1942) - Thomas (uncredited)
- You Can't Escape Forever (1942) - Scotty, Greer's Henchman (uncredited)
- Redhead from Manhattan (1943) - Fisherman (uncredited)
- The House on 92nd Street (1945) - German Spy Trainee (uncredited)
- A Double Life (1947) - Stagehand (uncredited)
- The Story of Mr. Hobbs (1947) - Spike
- Appointment with Murder (1948) - 2nd Thug (uncredited)
- I Cheated the Law (1949) - Bartender (uncredited)
- The Set-Up (1949) - Bat, Program Vendor (uncredited)
- The Crooked Way (1949) - Nick, Bailbondsman (uncredited)
- Canadian Pacific (1949) - Railroad Worker (uncredited)
- Come to the Stable (1949) - Lefty, Rossi's Goon (uncredited)
- Slattery's Hurricane (1949) - Bartender (uncredited)
- The Cowboy and the Indians (1949) - Smiley Martin
- Thieves' Highway (1949) - Cab Driver (uncredited)
- Prison Warden (1949) - Cory (uncredited)
- Tough Assignment (1949) - Steve
- The Threat (1949) - Lefty
- The Outriders (1950) - Outrider with Knife (uncredited)
- Black Hand (1950) - Semi-Moron (uncredited)
- Western Pacific Agent (1950) - Keystone
- Father of the Bride (1950) - Truck Driver (uncredited)
- Love That Brute (1950) - Gangster (uncredited)
- No Way Out (1950) - Mac (uncredited)
- Wyoming Mail (1950) - Prison Contact (uncredited)
- Kim (1950) - Abul (uncredited)
- California Passage (1950) - Sneed (uncredited)
- The Scarf (1951) - Gargantua (uncredited)
- Double Crossbones (1951) - Tavern Bouncer (uncredited)
- Across the Wide Missouri (1951) - Tige Shannon (uncredited)
- South of Caliente (1951) - Studsy Denning
- Love Is Better Than Ever (1952) - Mr. Carney, Wardrobe Man (uncredited)
- Carbine Williams (1952) - Truex
- Pat and Mike (1952) - Sam Garsell
- The Savage (1952) - Sergeant Norris
- Stop, You're Killing Me (1952) - Black Hat Gallagher (uncredited)
- Girls in the Night (1953) - Bartender Danny (uncredited)
- The System (1953) - Charley, Merrick's Butler
- The Caddy (1953) - Burly Caddie (uncredited)
- I, the Jury (1953) - Killer Thompson (uncredited)
- Clipped Wings (1953) - Cralia Dupree (uncredited)
- Prisoners of the Casbah (1953) - 2nd Thief
- Money from Home (1953) - Angry Truck Driver (uncredited)
- Tennessee Champ (1954) - J.B. Backett
- Return from the Sea (1954) - Bartender
- Destry (1954) - Dummy
- The Atomic Kid (1954) - Casino Officer (uncredited)
- Pirates of Tripoli (1955) - Zurtah (uncredited)
- New York Confidential (1955) - Hoodlum (uncredited)
- A Bullet for Joey (1955) - Ship Officer (uncredited)
- Spy Chasers (1955) - George
- Guys and Dolls (1955) - Man with Packages (uncredited)
- The Man with the Golden Arm (1955) - Blind Barfly (uncredited)
- The Killing (1956) - Track Employee in Locker Room (uncredited)
- Man from Del Rio (1956) - Ken, the Stableman (uncredited)
- Running Target (1956) - Castagna
- The Desperados Are in Town (1956) - Mr. Tawson (uncredited)
- The Storm Rider (1957) - Will Feylan
- The Persuader (1957) - Steve
- Gun Battle at Monterey (1957) - Gus (uncredited)
- The Hard Man (1957) - Vince Kane (uncredited)
- Escape from Red Rock (1957) - Price
- The World Was His Jury (1958) - Able-Bodied Seaman Milo Radvitch aka Mikel Petrov (uncredited)
- Teacher's Pet (1958) - Cab Driver (uncredited)
- How to Make a Monster (1958) - Studio Groundskeeper (uncredited)
- The Cry Baby Killer (1958) - Pete Gambelli
- The Black Orchid (1958) - Hood (uncredited)
- Revolt in the Big House (1958) - Jake
- Lonelyhearts (1958) - Taxi Driver
- Arson for Hire (1959) - Man Making Phone Calls
- The Hangman (1959) - Zimmerman (uncredited)
- The Gunfight at Dodge City (1959) - Burly Man with Saloon Girl (uncredited)
- Bells Are Ringing (1960) - Barney Lampwick's Friend - Man on Street (uncredited)
- From the Terrace (1960) - The Bartender (uncredited)
- The Hook (1963) - Crewman Kaskevitch
- The Greatest Story Ever Told (1965) - (uncredited)
- A Woman Under the Influence (1974) - Adolph

== Selected Television ==
Year	Title	Role	Notes
1953	Death Valley Days	Bartender Purdy	Season 1, Episode, "Land of the Free"
1953	The Lone Ranger	Bill Adams	Episode "The Devil's Bog"
1953	The Lone Ranger	Jeb Logan	Episode "Son by Adoption"
1953	The Lone Ranger	Duke	Episode "Gunpowder Joe"
1954	The Lone Ranger	Matt	Episode "Texas Draw"
1954	The Abbott and Costello Show	Slug	Episode "Private Eye"
1954	Death Valley Days	Townsman	Season 2, Episode 13, "Snowshoe Thompson"
1956	Death Valley Days	Townsman	Episode "Paydirt"
1958	Death Valley Days	Sitting Bull	Episode, "The Greatest Scout of All"
1958	Death Valley Days	Town Marshall	Episode "The Gunsmith"
1959	Alfred Hitchcock Presents	Monk McGinnis	Season 4 Episode 26: "Cheap is Cheap"
1960	Alfred Hitchcock Presents	Party Guest	Season 6 Episode 12: "The Baby-Blue Expression"
1960	Death Valley Days	Red Hacker	Episode "The Deserter"
1960	Wanted Dead or Alive	Jake	Episode "Miracle at Pot Hole"
