= Bowery at Midnight =

1942 film by Wallace Fox

- theatrical release poster
- Directed by: Wallace Fox
- Written by: Gerald Schnitzer
- Produced by: Sam Katzman; Jack Dietz
- Starring: Bela Lugosi; John Archer
- Cinematography: Mack Stengler
- Edited by: Carl Pierson
- Music by: Edward J. Kay
- Production company: Banner Productions
- Distributed by: Monogram Pictures
- Release date: October 1, 1942
- Running time: 60 or 63 minutes
- Country: United States
- Language: English

Bowery at Midnight

Bowery at Midnight is a 1942 American Monogram Pictures horror film directed by Wallace Fox and starring Bela Lugosi and John Archer. The film was re-released by Astor Pictures in 1949.

== Plot ==
Lugosi plays a psychology professor by day who, secretly and under an assumed name, runs a Bowery soup kitchen by night called the Bowery Friendly Mission. Lugosi's character uses his soup kitchen as a means to recruit members of a criminal gang, of which he is also secretly the head. Throughout the film, one of Lugosi's henchmen, a doctor who seems to be an alcoholic drug addict, alludes to having plans for the corpses of henchmen Lugosi has had killed. Then, at the end of the film, these corpses are revealed to have been restored to life by the doctor. Lugosi's character meets his demise when the doctor leads the unwitting Lugosi into a basement room where the reanimated corpses attack him. Towards the end of the film, the male lead, played by John Archer, appears to be killed and mysteriously reanimated, in which state his girlfriend sees him. Then, in the film's final scene, he appears restored to his former health, and not like a zombie at all and is about to marry, or already has married, his girlfriend.

In one scene, with two policemen talking outside a cinema, a movie poster outside the cinema entrance behind them advertises Bela Lugosi in The Corpse Vanishes, another Lugosi horror film also released in 1942. Another poster features Monogram's East Side Kids in Mr. Wise Guy. Both films were also produced by Sam Katzman.

== Cast ==
- Bela Lugosi as Professor Brenner, also known as Karl Wagner
- John Archer as Richard Dennison
- Wanda McKay as Judy Malvern
- Tom Neal as Frankie Mills
- Vince Barnett as Charley
- Anna Hope as Mrs. Brenner
- John Berkes as Fingers Dolan
- J. Farrell MacDonald as Capt. Mitchell
- Dave O'Brien as Peter Crawford
- Lucille Vance as Mrs. Malvern
- Lew Kelly as Doc Brooks
- Wheeler Oakman as Stratton
- Ray Miller as Big Man
- Bernard Gorcey as the used clothing shop proprietor

== Production ==
Following The Corpse Vanishes, Monogram Pictures announced it would make two more Bela Lugosi films, Night of Horror and Torment. These projects ended up being replaced by Bowery at Midnight and The Gorilla Strikes (which became The Ape Man).

Filming started on 3 August 1942.

== Reception ==
The Los Angeles Times called it "maybe the farthest fetched of the Bela Lugosi films", adding "but judging from the squeals of the youngsters who made up most of the audience in the afternoon such tales can't simply be brought from too great a distance to please them."

The very first broadcast of Late Night with David Letterman ended with Steve Fessler, a young comedian and performance artist from Brooklyn, reciting from memory all the dialogue from Bowery at Midnight onstage over the show's closing credits.

== See also ==
- List of films in the public domain in the United States
- Bela Lugosi filmography
