= Living in a Big Way =

1947 film by Gregory La Cava

- Directed by: Gregory La Cava
- Screenplay by: Gregory La Cava; Irving Ravetch
- Story by: Gregory La Cava
- Produced by: Pandro S. Berman
- Starring: Gene Kelly; Marie McDonald; Charles Winninger; Phyllis Thaxter; Spring Byington
- Cinematography: Harold Rosson
- Edited by: Ferris Webster
- Music by: Lennie Hayton
- Production company: Metro-Goldwyn-Mayer
- Distributed by: Loew's Inc.
- Release date: June 10, 1947
- Running time: 104 minutes
- Country: United States
- Language: English
- Budget: $2,839,000
- Box office: $1,513,000

Living in a Big Way is a 1947 American musical comedy film starring Gene Kelly, Marie McDonald as a couple who marry during World War II after only knowing each other a short time. This was director Gregory La Cava's final film.

== Plot ==
Leo Gogarty (Kelly) marries Margaud Morgan (McDonald) after a whirlwind romance just before shipping out to war. When he returns, he is surprised to discover not only that his bride is not what she led him to believe, but also that she expects a quick divorce. Mr. and Mrs. Gogarty must find their place with or without each other in a society still adjusting to peace.

Among the many Gene Kelly dance segments are 'Fido and Me', where Kelly dances with a dog and a statue, and a sequence on a construction site with a number of children.

== Cast ==
- Gene Kelly as Leo Gogarty
- Marie McDonald as Margaud Morgan
- Charles Winninger as D. Rutherford Morgan
- Phyllis Thaxter as Peggy Randall
- Spring Byington as Mrs. Minerva Alsop Morgan
- Jean Adair as Abigail Morgan
- Clinton Sundberg as Everett Hanover Smythe
- John Warburton as 'Skippy' Stuart Simms
- William Phillips as Schultz
- Bernadene Hayes as Dolly
- John Alexander as Attorney Ambridge
- Phyllis Kennedy as Annie Pearl

== Reception ==
The film earned $1,137,000 in the US and Canada and $376,000 elsewhere, resulting in a loss of $1,939,000 - one of MGM's biggest disasters of 1947.
