= Once a Thief (1950 film) =

1950 film by W. Lee Wilder

- Theatrical release poster
- Directed by: W. Lee Wilder
- Screenplay by: Richard S. Conway
- Story by: Max Colpet and Hans Wilhelm
- Produced by: W. Lee Wilder; William Stephens
- Starring: Cesar Romero; June Havoc; Marie McDonald; Lon Chaney Jr.
- Cinematography: William H. Clothier
- Edited by: Asa Boyd Clark
- Music by: Michel Michelet
- Production company: W. Lee Wilder Productions
- Distributed by: United Artists
- Release date: July 7, 1950
- Running time: 88 minutes
- Country: United States
- Language: English

Once a Thief is a 1950 American crime film noir directed by W. Lee Wilder starring Cesar Romero, June Havoc, Marie McDonald and Lon Chaney Jr.

== Plot ==
Margie Moore, a miserable San Francisco woman, turns in desperation to jewel robbery. She narrowly escapes apprehension in a heist and moves to Los Angeles, where she takes an honest job as a waitress. Her troubles resume when she falls in love with smooth-talking Mitch Foster, who reveals his true colors by stealing all of her money and then informing the authorities about her.

In prison with her partner-in-crime Pearl, Margie is visited by Mitch and waitress friend Flo. Mitch continues to try to extract money from her. Margie overpowers a doctor and slips away from prison disguised in the doctor's clothes. Law-enforcement authorities look for her at Mitch's and discover his illegal activities there. Mitch tries to escape, but Margie lures him to a deserted spot and shoots him.

== Cast ==
- Cesar Romero as Mitch Moore
- June Havoc as Margie Foster
- Marie McDonald as Flo
- Lon Chaney Jr. as Gus
- Iris Adrian as Pearl
- Jack Daly as Eddie
- Marta Mitrovich as Nickie
- Ann Tyrrell as Dr. Borden
- Michael Mark as Milton
- Kathleen Freeman as Phoebe
- Dana Broccoli as Jane (as Dana Wilson)
- Bill Baldwin as bondsman
- Lieutenant Francis Blumfeld as himself
- Deputy Gwendolph Dusuau as herself
- Chaplain John P. Battema as himself
- Deputy Dorris Mack as herself
- Deputy Irma Kunow as herself
- Officer Lloyd C. Smith as himself
- Sergeant Ruth Moore as herself
- Deputy Leauta Larsen as herself
