= Girl of the Ozarks =

1936 film by William Shea

- Theatrical release poster
- Directed by: William Shea
- Screenplay by: Stuart Anthony; Maurine Babb; John Bright; Michael L. Simmons; Robert Tasker
- Produced by: A.M. Botsford
- Starring: Virginia Weidler; Henrietta Crosman; Leif Erickson; Elizabeth Russell; Russell Simpson; Janet Young
- Cinematography: George T. Clemens
- Edited by: Harvey Johnston
- Music by: Gerard Carbonara; John Leipold
- Production company: Paramount Pictures
- Distributed by: Paramount Pictures
- Release date: June 12, 1936
- Running time: 68 minutes
- Country: United States
- Language: English

Girl of the Ozarks is a 1936 American drama film directed by William Shea and written by Stuart Anthony, Maurine Babb, John Bright, Michael L. Simmons and Robert Tasker. The film stars Virginia Weidler, Henrietta Crosman, Leif Erickson, Elizabeth Russell, Russell Simpson, and Janet Young. The film was released on June 12, 1936, by Paramount Pictures.

== Cast ==
- Virginia Weidler as Edie Moseley
- Henrietta Crosman as Granny Moseley
- Leif Erickson as Tom Bolton
- Elizabeth Russell as Gail Rogers
- Russell Simpson as Bascomb Rogers
- Janet Young as Maw Moseley
- Louis Mason as Sheriff Lem Stuart
- Nora Cecil as Miss Trent
- Lois Kent as Claire Rogers
- Arthur Aylesworth as Buck Wilder
- Harry Bates as Jonas Toler
- Nelson McDowell as Seth Tanner
- Jane Keckley as Mrs. Wilder
