= The Vigilante =

1947 film by Wallace Fox

- Movie poster
- Directed by: Wallace Fox
- Written by: Lewis Clay; Arthur Hoerl; George H. Plympton
- Based on: Greg Saunders by: Mort Weisinger; Mort Meskin
- Produced by: Sam Katzman
- Starring: Ralph Byrd; Ramsay Ames; Lyle Talbot; George Offerman Jr.
- Cinematography: Ira H. Morgan
- Edited by: Earl Turner
- Color process: Black and white
- Production company: Columbia Pictures
- Distributed by: Columbia Pictures
- Release date: May 22, 1947
- Running time: 285 minutes (15 chapters)
- Country: United States
- Language: English

The Vigilante, marketed as The Vigilante: Fighting Hero of the West, is a 1947 American Western film serial directed by Wallace Fox. The 33rd serial released by Columbia Pictures, it was based on the comic book cowboy Vigilante, who first appeared in Action Comics, published by DC Comics. It stars Ralph Byrd, well known for his central role in the Dick Tracy serials. It was his last serial appearance.

== Plot ==
The Vigilante, a masked government agent, is assigned to investigate the case of the "100 Tears of Blood", a cursed string of rare blood-red pearls sought by a gang led by the unknown X-1 that may have been smuggled into the country.

Greg Sanders, in his civilian guise as an actor, is filming a western on George Pierce's ranch. Pierce is a wealthy rancher and nightclub owner. When Prince Hamil arrives at the ranch, he gives a horse each to Sanders, Pierce, Captain Reilly, Tex Collier, and Betty Winslow, but an outlaw gang soon attacks, attempting to steal all five horses. It turns out that each horse has twenty of the pearls hidden in their shoes (five in each) in secret compartments. Edging closer, Sanders learns that Hamil's servant stole the diamonds from his master and smuggled them in on the horses with the intention of passing them on to X-1.

== Cast ==
- Ralph Byrd as Greg Sanders / The Vigilante
- Ramsay Ames as Betty Winslow, rodeo star
- Lyle Talbot as George Pierce
- George Offerman Jr. as Stuff, The Vigilante's sidekick
- Robert Barron as Prince Hamil, dignitary of Aravania. Barron was wrongly listed on-screen as Prince Hassan but referred to as Hamil.
- Hugh Prosser as Captain Reilly, highway patrol officer
- Jack Ingram as Silver Henchman X-2
- Eddie Parker as Doc Henchman X-3
- Tiny Brauer as Thorne Henchman X-9

== Production ==
The Vigilante was originally a comic book character whose first appearance was in Action Comics (issue #42, November 1941). He was a singing-cowboy radio performer who doubled as a motorcycle-riding crime-fighter along with a pre-teen Chinese boy, Stuff the Chinatown Kid.

In the serial version, Stuff became a white, draft-age sidekick played by George Offerman Jr. Ralph Byrd was cast as the Vigilante. Director Wallace Fox makes a cameo appearance as the director filming Greg Sanders' film at George Pierce's ranch.

== Chapter titles ==
1. The Vigilante Rides Again
2. Mystery of the White Horses
3. Double Peril
4. Desperate Flight
5. In the Gorilla's Cage
6. Battling the Unknown
7. Midnight Rendezvous
8. Blasted to Eternity
9. The Fatal Flood
10. Danger Ahead
11. X-1 Closes In
12. Death Rides the Rails
13. The Trap that Failed
14. Closing In
15. The Secret of the Skyroom

_{Source:}
