= The Sea Hound (serial) =

- Directed by: Walter B. Eason; Mack V. Wright; Sam Newfield (uncredited)
- Written by: Lewis Clay; Arthur Hoerl; George H. Plympton
- Produced by: Sam Katzman
- Starring: Buster Crabbe; Jimmy Lloyd; Pamela Blake; Ralph Hodges; Spencer Chan
- Cinematography: Ira H. Morgan
- Edited by: Earl Turner
- Music by: Paul Sawtell
- Distributed by: Columbia Pictures
- Release date: September 4, 1947
- Running time: 15 chapters, B&W
- Country: United States
- Language: English

The Sea Hound is a 1947 Columbia 15-chapter movie serial starring Buster Crabbe based on the radio show The Sea Hound. It was the 34th of the 57 serials produced by Columbia Pictures. Buster Crabbe starred as Capt. Silver, master of the Sea Hound, and Ralph Hodges played his faithful sidekick Jerry. Pamela Blake played the captain's love interest, Ann Whitney.

== Synopsis ==
Captain Silver and his crew receive a distress call in the South Pacific. They rescue the crew of a yacht from modern pirates and get caught up in a search for lost treasure.

== Cast ==
- Buster Crabbe as Captain Silver
- Jimmy Lloyd as Tex
- Pamela Blake as Ann Whitney
- Ralph Hodges as Jerry
- Spencer Chan as "Cookie" Kukai
- Robert Barron as The Admiral
- Hugh Prosser as Stanley Rand
- Rick Vallin as Manila Pete
- Jack Ingram as Murdock

== Chapter titles ==
1. Captain Silver Sails Again
2. Spanish Gold
3. The Mystery of the Map
4. Menaced by Ryaks
5. Captain Silver's Strategy
6. The Sea Hound at Bay
7. Rand's Treachery
8. In the Admiral's Lair
9. On the Water Wheel
10. On the Treasure Trail
11. The Sea Hound Attacked
12. Dangerous Waters
13. The Panther's Prey
14. The Fatal Double-cross
15. Captain Silver's Last Stand

_{Source:}
