= The Return of Rin Tin Tin =

1947 film by Max Nosseck

- Theatrical release poster
- Directed by: Max Nosseck
- Screenplay by: Jack DeWitt
- Story by: William Stephens
- Produced by: William Stephens
- Starring: Rin Tin Tin III; Donald Woods; Robert Blake; Claudia Drake; Steve Pendleton; Earle Hodgins
- Cinematography: Carl Berger
- Edited by: Michael Luciano; Elmo Veron
- Music by: Leo Erdody
- Production company: Romay Pictures Inc.
- Distributed by: Eagle-Lion Films
- Release date: November 1, 1947
- Running time: 65 minutes
- Country: United States
- Language: English

The Return of Rin Tin Tin is a 1947 American drama film directed by Max Nosseck and written by Jack DeWitt. The film stars Rin Tin Tin III, Donald Woods, Robert Blake, Claudia Drake, Steve Pendleton and Earle Hodgins. The film was released on November 1, 1947, by Eagle-Lion Films.

The story of a boy, a priest, and a dog.

== Cast ==
- Rin Tin Tin III as Rin Tin Tin
- Donald Woods as Father Matthew
- Robert Blake as Paul the Refugee Lad
- Claudia Drake as Mrs. Graham
- Steve Pendleton as Gordon Melrose
- Earle Hodgins as Joe

== Accolades ==
The film is recognized by American Film Institute in these lists:

- 2003: AFI's 100 Years...100 Heroes & Villains:
  - Rin Tin Tin – Nominated Hero
