= Gun Law Justice =

1949 film

- Theatrical release poster
- Directed by: Lambert Hillyer
- Screenplay by: Basil Dickey
- Produced by: Louis Gray
- Starring: Jimmy Wakely; Dub Taylor; Poni Adams; Lee Phelps; John James; I. Stanford Jolley
- Cinematography: Harry Neumann
- Edited by: Carl Pierson
- Production company: Monogram Pictures
- Distributed by: Monogram Pictures
- Release date: March 13, 1949
- Running time: 55 minutes
- Country: United States
- Language: English

Gun Law Justice is a 1949 American Western film directed by Lambert Hillyer and written by Basil Dickey. The film stars Jimmy Wakely, Dub Taylor, Poni Adams, Lee Phelps, John James and I. Stanford Jolley. The film was released on March 13, 1949, by Monogram Pictures.

== Cast ==
- Jimmy Wakely as Jimmy Wakely
- Dub Taylor as Cannonball
- Poni Adams as Jane Darnton
- Lee Phelps as Hank Cardigan
- John James as Tom Cardigan
- I. Stanford Jolley as Duke Corliss
- Myron Healey as Jensen
- Edmund Cobb as Sheriff
- Bob Woodward as Bob Davis
- Bob Curtis as Slim Craig
- Carol Henry as Bert
