= A Notorious Gentleman =

1935 film by Edward Laemmle

- Directed by: Edward Laemmle
- Screenplay by: Leopold Atlas; Rufus King; Robert Tasker
- Story by: Colin Clements; Florence Ryerson
- Produced by: Jerry Sackheim
- Starring: Charles Bickford; Helen Vinson; Onslow Stevens; Dudley Digges; Sidney Blackmer; John Darrow
- Cinematography: David Abel
- Edited by: Albert Akst
- Music by: Heinz Roemheld
- Production company: Universal Pictures
- Distributed by: Universal Pictures
- Release date: January 21, 1935
- Running time: 75 minutes
- Country: United States
- Language: English

A Notorious Gentleman is a 1935 American drama film directed by Edward Laemmle and written by Leopold Atlas, Rufus King and Robert Tasker. The film stars Charles Bickford, Helen Vinson, Onslow Stevens, Dudley Digges, Sidney Blackmer and John Darrow. The film was released on January 21, 1935, by Universal Pictures. The film was remade in 1946 as Smooth as Silk.

== Cast ==
- Charles Bickford as Kirk Arlen
- Helen Vinson as Nina Thorne
- Onslow Stevens as John Barrett
- Dudley Digges as Marleybone
- Sidney Blackmer as Clayton Bradford
- John Darrow as Terry Bradford
- John Larkin as Joshua
- George Irving as Judge Holman
- Evelyn Selbie as Carlena
- Alyce Ardell as Maid
