= Rustler's Round-Up =

- Theatrical release poster
- Directed by: Wallace Fox
- Screenplay by: Jack Natteford
- Story by: Sherman L. Lowe; Victor McLeod
- Produced by: Wallace Fox
- Starring: Kirby Grant; Fuzzy Knight; Poni Adams; Earle Hodgins; Charles Miller; Edmund Cobb; Ethan Laidlaw
- Cinematography: Maury Gertsman
- Edited by: Saul A. Goodkind
- Production company: Universal Pictures
- Distributed by: Universal Pictures
- Release date: August 9, 1946
- Running time: 57 minutes
- Country: United States
- Language: English

Rustler's Round-Up is a 1946 American Western film directed by Wallace Fox and written by Jack Natteford. The film stars Kirby Grant, Fuzzy Knight, Poni Adams, Earle Hodgins, Charles Miller, Edmund Cobb and Ethan Laidlaw. The film was released on August 9, 1946, by Universal Pictures.

== Cast ==
- Kirby Grant as Bob Ryan
- Fuzzy Knight as Pinkerton J. 'Pinky' Pratt
- Poni Adams as Josephine Fremont
- Earle Hodgins as Sheriff Fin Elder
- Charles Miller as Judge Wayne
- Edmund Cobb as Victor Todd
- Ethan Laidlaw as Louie Todd
- Mauritz Hugo as Jefferson 'Faro' King
- Eddy Waller as Tom Fremont
- Frank Merlo as Jules Todd
