= Hideaway Girl =

1936 film by George Archainbaud

- Theatrical release poster
- Directed by: George Archainbaud
- Screenplay by: David Garth; Joseph Moncure March
- Produced by: A.M. Botsford
- Starring: Shirley Ross; Robert Cummings; Martha Raye; Monroe Owsley; Elizabeth Russell; Louis Da Pron
- Cinematography: George T. Clemens; Ted Tetzlaff
- Edited by: Arthur P. Schmidt
- Music by: Score: Friedrich Hollaender; Songs: Sam Coslow; Burton Lane (music); Ralph Rainger (music); Victor Young (music); Ralph Freed (lyrics); Leo Robin (lyrics)
- Production company: Paramount Pictures
- Distributed by: Paramount Pictures
- Release date: November 20, 1936
- Running time: 72 minutes
- Country: United States
- Language: English

Hideaway Girl is a 1936 American comedy film directed by George Archainbaud and written by David Garth and Joseph Moncure March. The film stars Shirley Ross, Robert Cummings, Martha Raye, Monroe Owsley, Elizabeth Russell and Louis Da Pron. The film was released on November 20, 1936, by Paramount Pictures.

== Cast ==
- Shirley Ross as Toni Ainsworth
- Robert Cummings as Mike Winslow
- Martha Raye as Helen Flint
- Monroe Owsley as Count de Montaigne
- Elizabeth Russell as Cellette
- Louis Da Pron as Tom Flint
- Ray Walker as Freddie
- Robert Middlemass as Capt. Dixon
- Edward Brophy as Bugs Murphy
- James Eagles as Birdie Arnold
- Bob Murphy as Capt. MacArthur
- Lee Phelps as Police Sgt. Davis
- Kenneth Harlan as Lead steward
- Jimmie Dundee as Detective
- Marten Lamont as Sailor
- Frank Losee Jr. as Sailor
- A.S. 'Pop' Byron as Dock watchman
- Chester Gan as Chinese cook
- Harry Jordan as Chauffeur
- Allen Pomeroy as Chauffeur
- James Barton as Motorcycle cop
- Donald Kerr as Cameraman
- Bert Moorhouse as Cameraman
- Wilma Francis as Muriel Courtney

== Production ==
Cummings was cast when Lew Ayres refused to play the role.

== Reception ==
Frank Nugent of The New York Times said, "Miss Martha Raye, the lusty lark of Paramount's roster of curiosa, has her starring moment in Hideaway Girl, current at the Rialto. Some one in our circle has suggested that the explosive Miss Raye has but one opportunity left—to swallow a stick of dynamite and light the fuse, distributing her animated self over a Paramount set. In Hideaway Girl Miss Raye falls sadly short of this mark, contenting herself, in her own peculiar form of vociferation, with expressing her preference for "Liszt, Beethoven or Bach" over the current manifestation of vo-de-o-do. She expresses this preference with swing dance gestures."

The Picturegoer's Lionel Collier wrote "it all wears very thin and becomes distinctly boring towards the end. This sense of boredom is not helped by the singing of Miss Raye, the lady who rivals Joe E. Brown in mouth appeal. Shirley Ross sings pleasingly as a contrast, and Bob Cummings makes a passable hero.
