= Smooth as Silk =

1946 film by Charles Barton

- Theatrical release poster
- Directed by: Charles Barton
- Written by: Florence Ryerson; Colin Clements
- Screenplay by: Dane Lussier; Kerry Shaw
- Story by: Colin Clements
- Produced by: Jack Bernhard; Howard Welsch
- Starring: Kent Taylor, Virginia Grey, Milburn Stone
- Cinematography: Elwood Bredell
- Edited by: Ray Snyder
- Music by: Ernest Gold
- Production company: Universal Pictures
- Distributed by: Universal Pictures
- Release date: February 1946
- Running time: 64 minutes
- Country: United States
- Language: English

Smooth as Silk is a 1946 American noir film directed by Charles Barton and starring Kent Taylor, Virginia Grey, and Milburn Stone. The film is also known as Notorious Gentleman as it is a version of 1935 film A Notorious Gentleman. The film focuses on the murder of a theater producer (John Litel) committed by a lawyer (Kent Taylor), after the lawyer's bride, an actress (Virginia Gray), left him for the producer to win a role in his new musical. Despite the fascinating plot and tense intrigue, this film failed to attract much attention.

== Plot ==
Successful lawyer Mark Fenton seeks to, and achieves, the acquittal of young playboy Don Elliott, who is accused of driving drunk and killing a pedestrian. After completing the case, Mark approaches Don's uncle and trustee—the respected theater producer Stephen Elliott—to give his girlfriend, actress Paula Marlowe a role in his new theatrical production. Stephen rejects the approach but compensates his refusal with a generous fee. Meanwhile, Paula's younger sister Susan arrives, and Mark invites both sisters to a restaurant. During the dinner, Paula is upset by Stephen's refusal to give her the role. Mark introduces the sisters to his friend, the district attorney John Kimble, and to his teacher, the experienced lawyer Fletcher Holiday. They notice Don Elliott drinking at the bar counter. Mark mentions that Don is Stephen's nephew and heir to the family wealth, which is now managed by his uncle. This fact invites Paula's keen interest. She speaks with Don and arranges a meeting with him at her home that evening. Paula begins dating Don on a regular basis. This pleases Stephen very much, because under her influence, Don quits drinking. One evening, Paula turns to Don, requesting to arrange her for the coveted role in Stephen's play. However, Don refuses to talk about this with his uncle on the grounds that the main character of the play is a vicious and deceitful woman, and he knows that such a role does not fit Paula at all.

Pleased by Paula's influence on his nephew, Stephen decides to invite her to a dinner party. Although Susan sees Paula simply manipulating both men for the role, she agrees to accompany her sister to the dinner. Learning during the dinner that Don will not inherit the family fortune if he marries before he is 30, Paula tells Stephen that Don is not really interested in her but in Susan. Feeling that Stephen likes her, Paula directly asks him for a major role in his new play. After consulting with his butler Walcott, Stephen agrees to her request. After that evening, Paula begins dating Stephen, while staying in touch with Mark but ignoring Don, who again starts to drink because of despair. The premiere of Stephen's new play with Paula in the title role sees great success. At a party after the successful premiere, Mark tries to clarify his relationship with Paula, but Stephen publicly announces his engagement to her. After hearing this, a furious Mark pounces at Stephen with his fists. At Paula's request, he leaves.

Mark hires a private detective to arrange secret surveillance of both Paula and Stephen—and soon receives information about their immediate plans, as well as about a tense conversation between Stephen and Don, during which Don threatened his uncle. Subsequently, Mark sneaks into Paula's apartment and steals her bracelet and cigarette butt, and goes to see Stephen. Threatening him with a gun, Mark tells Stephen that he will shoot him and frame him for murdering Paula. In despair, Stephen proposes to break his engagement with Paula, but the lawyer still kills him. Leaving the evidence to frame Paula for this murder, Mark imperceptibly goes outside and waits for her arrival. When Paula discovers Stephen's body, she storms out of the house into the street, where she encounters Mark, who says he has come to apologize to Stephen for yesterday's incident. After sending Paula home, Mark calls prosecutor Kimble, stating that he has just shot Stephen Elliott. Arriving at the scene, Kimble immediately begins to suspect Paula, especially after he finds the evidence that Mark planted in advance. Kimble detains Paula, and Mark persuades Holiday to become his lawyer. Meticulous Holiday demands to conduct an investigative experiment, and the results only aggravates suspicions against Paula. Mark begins to fear that Paula may actually be convicted. To avoid it, Mark convinces Don that it was he, while drunk, who killed Stephen. After Mark's departure, the depressed Don calls Kimble, confesses to the murder, and says that he is going to commit suicide. When Don mentions that it was Mark who convinced him it his fault, Kimble responds that he knows who the murderer is.

Soon, Mark receives a letter from Don, who reports that he confessed to the prosecutor and wanted to commit suicide but he did not have enough strength to do so. Fearing that he could still shoot himself, Don has sent Mark a pistol along with the letter. Mark, taking the received weapon, goes to the Elliott house, intent on killing Don and disguising the murder as a suicide. When Mark shoots the supposedly sleeping Don, Kimble appears along with the police, who arrest Mark for killing Stephen. As it turns out, Kimble specifically arranged this trap for Mark, persuading Don to serve as bait and preloading his pistol with empty cartridges.

== Cast ==
- Kent Taylor as Mark Fenton
- Virginia Grey as Paula Marlowe
- Jane Adams as Susan Marlowe
- Milburn Stone as John Kimble
- John Litel as Stephen Elliott
- Danny Morton as Don Elliott
- Charles Trowbridge as Fletcher Holliday
- Theresa Harris as Louise
- Ralph Brooks as Detective
- Bert Moorhouse as Detective
- Harry Cheshire as Walcott

== Reception ==
Hal Erickson of Allmovie gave the film three stars out of five and stated "Though running a scant 65 minutes, Smooth as Silk packs a bigger wallop than some of Universal's more ambitious "A" melodramas of the same period."

== Home media ==
Smooth as Silk was released on DVD on January 31, 2017.
