= Hugh Prosser =

American actor

Hugh Prosser (March 2, 1907 – November 8, 1952) was a Hollywood actor who appeared in over 90 films between 1936 and 1953.

A native of Illinois, Prosser was a versatile supporting performer particularly adept at playing unscrupulous villains, but also satisfactory in character roles and the occasional sympathetic part. Also very prolific on early television shows, he played bit parts in some renowned films but excelled both in B-movies and several cliffhanger serials.

Prosser was killed in an automobile accident near Gallup, New Mexico at the age of 45. An Associated Press story about his accident gave his age as 46.

== Selected filmography ==
=== Film ===
- The Millionaire Kid (1936) - Henchman (uncredited)
- Blockade (1938) - Minor Role (uncredited)
- Come On, Leathernecks! (1938) - Marine (uncredited)
- Flying G-Men (1939, Serial) - Stokes (uncredited)
- The Night Riders (1939) - Federal Man (uncredited)
- Bachelor Mother (1939) - Merlin's Chauffeur (uncredited)
- Mr. District Attorney (1941) - Barrett's Aide (uncredited)
- Lady from Louisiana (1941) - Politician (uncredited)
- Hands Across the Rockies (1941) - Cash Jennings
- The Devil Pays Off (1941) - Ship's Purser (uncredited)
- Sierra Sue (1941) - Frenchy Montague
- West of Cimarron (1941) - Charles Bentley
- Dick Tracy vs. Crime Inc. (1941, Serial) - Patrol Captain (uncredited)
- Junior G-Men of the Air (1942, Serial) - Army Lieutenant [Ch. 12] (uncredited)
- Spy Smasher (1942, Serial) - Flight 4 Squadron Leader [Ch. 7] (uncredited)
- Sabotage Squad (1942) - Saboteur (uncredited)
- Boss of Hangtown Mesa (1942) - Utah Kid
- Lost Canyon (1942) - Sheriff
- They Got Me Covered (1943) - Captain (uncredited)
- Border Patrol (1943) - Mine Boss (uncredited)
- They Came to Blow Up America (1943) - FBI Agent (uncredited)
- Action in the North Atlantic (1943) - Lieutenant Commander (uncredited)
- The Desperadoes (1943) - Lieutenant (uncredited)
- So Proudly We Hail! (1943) - Captain (uncredited)
- Northern Pursuit (1943) - Corporal (uncredited)
- Riders of the Deadline (1943) - Deputy Sheriff Martin
- Destination Tokyo (1943) - PBY Seaplane Pilot (uncredited)
- Henry Aldrich, Boy Scout (1944) - 1st Scout Master (uncredited)
- The Fighting Seabees (1944) - Seabee (uncredited)
- Range Law (1944) - Sheriff Jed Hawkins
- West of the Rio Grande (1944) - Lucky Cramer - Henchman
- Land of the Outlaws (1944) - Ed Hammond
- Song of the Range (1944) - Bruce Carter
- Double Exposure (1944) - Detective (uncredited)
- Adventures of Kitty O'Day (1945) - Nick Joel
- Dillinger (1945) - Guard (uncredited)
- Flame of Barbary Coast (1945) - Fred Mallen (uncredited)
- Code of the Lawless (1945) - Lester Ward
- Cornered (1945) - Police Assistant (uncredited)
- Pardon My Past (1945) - Mr. Long
- My Reputation (1946) - Les Hanson (uncredited)
- The Phantom Rider (1946, Serial) - Keeeler
- They Made Me a Killer (1946) - Cop at Railroad Station (uncredited)
- The French Key (1946) - Swede (uncredited)
- Suspense (1946) - Photographer (uncredited)
- Monsieur Beaucaire (1946) - Courtier (uncredited)
- Son of the Guardsman (1946, Serial) - Red Robert
- Sinbad the Sailor (1947) - Captain of Guard (uncredited)
- Vacation Days (1947) - Tom Sneed
- Jack Armstrong (1947, Serial) - Vic Hardy
- The Vigilante (1947, Serial) - Police Capt. Reilly
- Prairie Raiders (1947) - Bart Henley (uncredited)
- The Sea Hound (1947, Serial) - Stanley Rand
- Unconquered (1947) - Soldier in Gilded Beaver (uncredited)
- Dragnet (1947)
- Six-Gun Law (1948) - Decker - Boss
- Caged Fury (1948) - Ringmaster (uncredited)
- A Connecticut Yankee in King Arthur's Court (1948) - Sir Belvedere (uncredited)
- Daredevils of the Clouds (1948) - RCMP Sergeant Dickson
- Trail to Laredo (1948) - Fenton
- Congo Bill (1948, Serial) - Morelli
- The Plunderers (1948) - Fort Officer (uncredited)
- Bruce Gentry (1949, Serial) - Paul Radcliffe
- Western Renegades (1949) - (uncredited)
- Samson and Delilah (1949) - Tax Collector (uncredited)
- Adventures of Sir Galahad (1949, Serial) - Sir Lancelot
- Cody of the Pony Express (1950, Serial) - Syndicate Man (uncredited)
- The Great Jewel Robber (1950) - Captain (uncredited)
- Atom Man vs. Superman (1950, Serial) - HQ Henchman [Ch. 2] (uncredited)
- Across the Badlands (1950) - Jeff Carson
- Pirates of the High Seas (1950, Serial) - Roper - Jeff's First Mate [Chs.1-2, 5-8]
- Outlaw Gold (1950) - Roger Bigsby
- Roar of the Iron Horse - Rail-Blazer of the Apache Trail (1951, Serial) - Lefty - Henchman [Chs.1-4,7-9]
- The Texas Rangers (1951) - Bob - Texas Ranger (uncredited)
- Hurricane Island (1951) - King's Courier (uncredited)
- Mysterious Island (1951, Serial) - Gideon Spillett
- The Desert Fox: The Story of Rommel (1951) - Surgeon (uncredited)
- The Golden Horde (1951) - Samarkand Man (uncredited)
- The Greatest Show on Earth (1952) - Hugh (uncredited)
- Bend of the River (1952) - Johnson (uncredited)
- The Treasure of Lost Canyon (1952) - Fire Captain (uncredited)
- The World in His Arms (1952) - Mounted Cossack Officer (uncredited)
- The Miraculous Blackhawk: Freedom's Champion (1952) - Colonel (uncredited)
- Montana Incident (1952) - Max Martin (uncredited)
- Canyon Ambush (1952) - George Millarde
- Back at the Front (1952) - Lieutenant General in Wash Room (uncredited)
- The Prisoner of Zenda (1952) - Uhlan Guard at Hunting Lodge (uncredited)
- The Lone Hand (1953) - Regulator (uncredited)
- Take Me to Town (1953) - Logger (uncredited)
- The Beast from 20,000 Fathoms (1953) - Doctor (uncredited)
- The Man from the Alamo (1953) - (uncredited) (final film role)

=== TV shows ===
- The Gene Autry Show (1951–1952) - Matt Nixon / Lawyer Latimer
- The Cisco Kid (1951–1952) - Joe Wallace / Henchman Larry / Jed Haskell
- Boston Blackie (1952)
- The Lone Ranger (1949–1953) - Frank Carlson / Hilton McCabe / Sheriff Jim Lake / Jim Arnold / Jeb Logan / Amos Carter / Stan Beeler / Henchman

== Sources ==
- Saturday Afternoon At The Movies: 3 in 1 – Alan G. Barbour. Publisher: Random House Value Publishing, 1987. Format: Hardcover, 568pp. Language: English. ISBN 0-517-60898-7
- In the Nick of Time: Motion Picture Sound Serials – William C. Cline. Publisher: McFarland & Company, 1997. Format: Paperback: 293pp. Language: English. ISBN 0-7864-0471-X
- Serials and Series: A World Filmography, 1912-1956 – Buck Rainey. Publisher: McFarland & Company, 1999. Format: Hardcover, 321pp. Language: English. ISBN 0-7864-0449-3
- To Be Continued – Ken Weiss, Edwin Goodgold. Publisher: Bonanza Books, 1972. Format: Paperback, 341 pages. Language: English. ISBN 0-517-50340-9
