= Wallace Fox =

American film director

- Born: March 9, 1895; Purcell, Oklahoma
- Died: June 30, 1958 (aged 63); Hollywood, California
- Occupation: Film director
- Years active: 1913-1922

Wallace Fox (March 9, 1895 – June 30, 1958) was an American film director. He directed more than 80 films between 1927 and 1953. He was born in Purcell, Oklahoma, and died in Hollywood, California.

== Selected filmography ==
- Trail of Courage (1928)
- The Ridin' Renegade (1928)
- The Avenging Rider (1928)
- Driftin' Sands (1928)
- Partners of the Trail (1931)
- Devil on Deck (1932)
- Cannonball Express (1932)
- Gun Packer (1938)
- Bowery Blitzkrieg (1941)
- The Corpse Vanishes (1942)
- Let's Get Tough! (1942)
- Bowery at Midnight (1942)
- 'Neath Brooklyn Bridge (1942)
- Bullets for Bandits (1942)
- The Girl from Monterrey (1943)
- The Great Mike (1944)
- Brenda Starr, Reporter (1945)
- Docks of New York (1945)
- Pillow of Death (1945)
- Rustler's Round-Up (1946)
- Wild Beauty (1946)
- The Vigilante (1947)
- The Gay Amigo (1949)
- West of Wyoming (1950)
- Gunslingers (1950)
- Blazing Bullets (1951)
