= List of Monogram Pictures and Allied Artists Pictures films =

This is a list of feature films originally released and/or distributed by Monogram Pictures and Allied Artists Pictures Corporation. Monogram/Allied Artists' post-August 1946 library is currently owned by Warner Bros. (via Lorimar Motion Pictures), while 187 pre-August 1946 Monogram films are owned by Metro-Goldwyn-Mayer (via United Artists) and select post-1938 Monogram films are owned by Paramount Pictures (via Melange Pictures).

Monogram was established in 1931, and concentrated on low-budget releases. In 1935, it was merged into the conglomerate formed by Herbert Yates as Republic Pictures, but in 1937, it was re-established as an independent studio. In 1947, a separate subsidiary, Allied Artists, was established with the intention of releasing some higher-budget films than traditionally associated with the company. By 1953, the Monogram brand was dropped completely and Allied Artists continued until 1978, in its later years largely concentrating on the distribution of films produced by other companies, often in Europe.

== Monogram Pictures ==
=== 1930s ===
All Monogram Pictures films from the 1930s are in the public domain, except for Dark Sands and The Phantom Strikes.

Release date	Title	Notes
June 15, 1931	Ships of Hate	
June 24, 1931	Dugan of the Badlands	
July 22, 1931	Partners of the Trail	
August 1, 1931	Mother and Son	
August 10, 1931	The Montana Kid	(Note: Owned by MGM (via United Artists))
September 9, 1931	The Man from Death Valley	
October 10, 1931	Oklahoma Jim	
October 20, 1931	Two Fisted Justice	
October 30, 1931	Land of Wanted Men	
November 28, 1931	In Line of Duty	
December 1, 1931	Forgotten Women	
December 5, 1931	Galloping Thru	
December 15, 1931	The Law of the Sea	distribution only; produced by Chadwick Pictures (Note: Owned by Sony Pictures (under Columbia Pictures))
January 2, 1932	Ghost City	
January 17, 1932	The Gay Buckaroo	
February 10, 1932	Single-Handed Sanders	
February 15, 1932	The Reckoning	
February 20, 1932	Police Court	distribution only; produced by Chadwick Pictures
March 1, 1932	Texas Pioneers	
April 1, 1932	The County Fair	
April 1, 1932	The Man from New Mexico	
April 10, 1932	Midnight Patrol	
April 15, 1932	Vanishing Men	
April 20, 1932	The Arm of the Law	
May 15, 1932	Mason of the Mounted	
May 30, 1932	Law of the North	
May 30, 1932	Flames	distribution only; produced by Chadwick Pictures
June 20, 1932	Honor of the Mounted	
July 17, 1932	Son of Oklahoma	
July 20, 1932	Western Limited	
August 10, 1932	The Thirteenth Guest	(Note: Owned by Warner Bros. (via Lorimar Motion Pictures))
August 30, 1932	Klondike	
September 10, 1932	Broadway to Cheyenne	
October 10, 1932	Hidden Valley	
October 21, 1932	The Man from Arizona	
October 24, 1932	The Girl from Calgary	distribution only; produced by Chadwick Pictures
November 5, 1932	Young Blood	
November 15, 1932	Guilty or Not Guilty	
November 20, 1932	A Strange Adventure	distribution only; produced by Chadwick Pictures
December 1, 1932	Lucky Larrigan	
December 15, 1932	Self Defense	
December 15, 1932	The Fighting Champ	
December 30, 1932	Crashin' Broadway	
January 10, 1933	Jungle Bride	distribution only; produced by Chadwick Pictures
January 31, 1933	West of Singapore	
February 28, 1933	Oliver Twist	distribution only; produced by Chadwick Productions
March 1, 1933	Breed of the Border	
March 15, 1933	The Phantom Broadcast	
March 27, 1933	Wine, Women and Song	distribution only; produced by Chadwick Pictures
April 1, 1933	Black Beauty	distribution only; produced by Chadwick Pictures
April 23, 1933	Diamond Trail	
May 16, 1933	Trailing North	
May 25, 1933	The Return of Casey Jones	distribution only; produced by Chadwick Pictures
May 29, 1933	The Gallant Fool	
June 1, 1933	The Sphinx	
June 15, 1933	Fighting Texans	
July 15, 1933	The Fugitive	
July 25, 1933	Rainbow Ranch	
August 5, 1933	Galloping Romeo	
August 10, 1933	The Avenger	
August 15, 1933	Ranger's Code	
August 20, 1933	The Devil's Mate	
August 30, 1933	Sensation Hunters	
August 30, 1933	Skyway	
October 10, 1933	Riders of Destiny	First John Wayne Lone Star Western
October 20, 1933	Broken Dreams	
October 26, 1933	The Sweetheart of Sigma Chi	
December 15, 1933	Sagebrush Trail	Lone Star Western
December 15, 1933	He Couldn't Take It	
January 18, 1934	Sixteen Fathoms Deep	
January 22, 1934	The Lucky Texan	Lone Star Western
February 7, 1934	A Woman's Man	
February 15, 1934	West of the Divide	Lone Star Western
February 22, 1934	Beggars in Ermine	
March 15, 1934	Mystery Liner	
March 30, 1934	House of Mystery	
April 15, 1934	City Limits	
April 30, 1934	Manhattan Love Song	
May 10, 1934	Blue Steel	Lone Star Western (Note: Owned by Multicom Entertainment Group)
May 11, 1934	Cheaters	
May 15, 1934	The Man from Utah	Lone Star Western
May 20, 1934	Monte Carlo Nights	
June 1, 1934	The Loudspeaker	
June 5, 1934	Randy Rides Alone	Lone Star Western
June 14, 1934	Money Means Nothing	
July 20, 1934	Shock	
July 30, 1934	The Star Packer	Lone Star Western
August 15, 1934	Jane Eyre	
August 20, 1934	The Moonstone	
September 1, 1934	Happy Landing	
September 15, 1934	King Kelly of the U.S.A.	
October 15, 1934	A Successful Failure	
October 15, 1934	Tomorrow's Youth	
October 15, 1934	A Girl of the Limberlost	
October 22, 1934	The Trail Beyond	Lone Star Western
November 1, 1934	The Fighting Trooper	
November 1, 1934	Redhead	
November 15, 1934	Lost in the Stratosphere	
November 17, 1934	Girl o' My Dreams	
November 22, 1934	The Lawless Frontier	Lone Star Western
December 1, 1934	Flirting with Danger	
December 5, 1934	'Neath the Arizona Skies	Lone Star Western
December 15, 1934	Sing Sing Nights	
December 22, 1934	The Mysterious Mr. Wong	
December 29, 1934	Million Dollar Baby	
February 12, 1935	The Mystery Man	
February 1, 1935	Women Must Dress	
February 1, 1935	Texas Terror	Lone Star Western
March 15, 1935	Rainbow Valley	Lone Star Western
March 25, 1935	The Nut Farm	
April 15, 1935	Great God Gold	
April 22, 1935	The Desert Trail	Lone Star Western
May 15, 1935	The Hoosier Schoolmaster	
May 15, 1935	The Texas Rambler	
May 29, 1935	Dizzy Dames	
June 15, 1935	The Healer	
June 20, 1935	The Dawn Rider	Lone Star Western
July 1, 1935	Honeymoon Limited	
July 6, 1935	Shadows of the Orient	
July 9, 1935	Make a Million	
July 15, 1935	The Keeper of the Bees	
July 20, 1935	Paradise Canyon	Lone Star Western
August 5, 1935	Cheers of the Crowd	
October 17, 1935	Texas Terror	Lone Star Western
June 30, 1937	The 13th Man	
July 4, 1937	Blazing Barriers	
July 7, 1937	Hoosier Schoolboy	
July 14, 1937	Riders of the Dawn	
July 21, 1937	Paradise Isle	
July 28, 1937	The Legion of Missing Men	
August 4, 1937	The Outer Gate	
August 25, 1937	Atlantic Flight	
September 2, 1937	God's Country and the Man	
September 22, 1937	Stars Over Arizona	
September 29, 1937	A Bride for Henry	
October 13, 1937	Where Trails Divide	
October 30, 1937	Federal Bullets	
November 3, 1937	Danger Valley	
November 17, 1937	Luck of Roaring Camp	
November 24, 1937	County Fair	distribution only; produced by Crescent Pictures Corporation
December 7, 1937	Telephone Operator	
December 8, 1937	Boy of the Streets	
December 15, 1937	Romance of the Rockies	
January 12, 1938	West of Rainbow's End	
January 27, 1938	Saleslady	
February 2, 1938	Where the West Begins	
February 9, 1938	My Old Kentucky Home	
February 16, 1938	The Painted Trail	
February 23, 1938	The Port of Missing Girls	
March 3, 1938	Adventures of Chico	New England distribution only; produced by Woodard Productions (Note: Owned by Paramount Pictures (via Melange Pictures))
March 11, 1938	Land of Fighting Men	
March 16, 1938	Rose of the Rio Grande	
April 8, 1938	Code of the Rangers	
April 15, 1938	Female Fugitive	
April 30, 1938	Two Gun Justice	
May 22, 1938	Numbered Woman	
May 27, 1938	Gunsmoke Trail	
May 27, 1938	Phantom Ranger	
June 8, 1938	The Marines Are Here	
June 16, 1938	Romance of the Limberlost	
July 6, 1938	Man's Country	
August 3, 1938	Barefoot Boy	
August 31, 1938	Under the Big Top	
September 7, 1938	Starlight Over Texas	
September 14, 1938	The Mexicali Kid	
September 21, 1938	Wanted by the Police	
October 5, 1938	Mr. Wong, Detective	
October 12, 1938	Where the Buffalo Roam	
November 10, 1938	Gang Bullets	
November 16, 1938	Gangster's Boy	
November 16, 1938	Gun Packer	
December 7, 1938	I Am a Criminal	
December 7, 1938	Song of the Buckaroo	
December 21, 1938	Wild Horse Canyon	
December 28, 1938	Tough Kid	
January 18, 1939	Convict's Code	
January 25, 1939	Drifting Westward	
February 8, 1939	Navy Secrets	
February 8, 1939	Sundown on the Prairie	
February 22, 1939	Star Reporter	
March 1, 1939	Rollin' Westward	
March 8, 1939	The Mystery of Mr. Wong	
March 8, 1939	Mystery Plane	
March 12, 1939	Trigger Smith	
March 18, 1939	Lure of the Wasteland	
April 12, 1939	Streets of New York	
April 19, 1939	Undercover Agent	
April 19, 1939	Man from Texas	
May 1, 1939	Boys' Reformatory	
May 22, 1939	Wolf Call	
June 1, 1939	Across the Plains	
June 2, 1939	Inside Information	
June 8, 1939	Should a Girl Marry?	
June 14, 1939	Down the Wyoming Trail	
July 1, 1939	Stunt Pilot	
July 10, 1939	Bad Boy	
August 1, 1939	Mr. Wong in Chinatown	
August 7, 1939	Girl from Rio	
August 16, 1939	Riders of the Frontier	produced by Edward F. Finney Productions
August 22, 1939	Irish Luck	
August 22, 1939	Port of Hate	
August 25, 1939	Oklahoma Terror	
September 12, 1939	Sky Patrol	
October 24, 1939	Mutiny in the Big House	
November 1, 1939	Danger Flight	
November 5, 1939	Fighting Mad	
November 16, 1939	Overland Mail	
November 15, 1939	The Phantom Strikes	British Film (Note: Owned by StudioCanal)
December 11, 1939	Crashing Thru	Renfrew of the Royal Mounted
December 11, 1939	Heroes in Blue	
December 15, 1939	Westbound Stage	
December 25, 1939	The Gentleman from Arizona	First feature film in Cinecolor

=== 1940s ===
All Monogram Pictures films after 1944 are copyrighted unless noted.

Release date	Title	Notes
January 2, 1940	Yukon Flight	distribution only; produced by Criterion Pictures Corp. Renfrew of the Royal Mounted
January 15, 1940	The Fatal Hour	Mr. Wong
January 20, 1940	Hidden Enemy	
January 22, 1940	Danger Ahead	Renfrew of the Royal Mounted
January 25, 1940	Pioneer Days	
January 30, 1940	Chasing Trouble	
February 10, 1940	East Side Kids	First East Side Kids film
February 20, 1940	The Cheyenne Kid	
February 25, 1940	Murder on the Yukon	Renfrew of the Royal Mounted
March 2, 1940	Rhythm of the Rio Grande	
March 9, 1940	The Human Monster	distribution only; produced by Argyle Film (Note: Owned by StudioCanal and Paramount Pictures (via Melange Pictures))
March 20, 1940	Midnight Limited	
March 30, 1940	Son of the Navy	
April 10, 1940	Covered Wagon Trails	
April 20, 1940	Pals of the Silver Sage	
April 21, 1940	The Four Just Men	British film
April 25, 1940	Tomboy	
April 30, 1940	The Mind of Mr. Reeder	British film
May 1, 1940	Pinto Canyon	
May 9, 1940	The Cowboy from Sundown	
May 9, 1940	Land of the Six Guns	
May 23, 1940	The Kid from Santa Fe	
June 11, 1940	On the Spot	
June 25, 1940	The Last Alarm	
June 26, 1940	Wild Horse Range	
July 3, 1940	The Golden Trail	
July 7, 1940	Sky Bandits	Renfrew of the Royal Mounted
July 15, 1940	Boys of the City	East Side Kids
July 22, 1940	Haunted House	
July 29, 1940	Rainbow Over the Range	
August 12, 1940	Doomed to Die	Mr. Wong
August 12, 1940	Laughing at Danger	
August 16, 1940	Roll Wagons Roll	
August 19, 1940	Arizona Frontier	
August 22, 1940	The Range Busters	First of the Range Busters series
August 26, 1940	Queen of the Yukon	
September 9, 1940	Up in the Air	
September 23, 1940	That Gang of Mine	East Side Kids
September 30, 1940	The Ape	
October 7, 1940	Drums of the Desert	
October 10, 1940	Trailing Double Trouble	Range Busters
October 21, 1940	The Old Swimmin' Hole	
November 6, 1940	The Missing People	British film
November 11, 1940	Take Me Back to Oklahoma	
November 18, 1940	Phantom of Chinatown	
November 25, 1940	West of Pinto Basin	Range Busters
December 15, 1940	Pride of the Bowery	East Side Kids
December 20, 1940	Chamber of Horrors	distribution only; produced by John Argyle Productions
December 25, 1940	Her First Romance	
December 30, 1940	Riders from Nowhere	
December 30, 1940	Rollin' Home to Texas	
December 1940	Stolen Paradise	
January 4, 1941	Trail of the Silver Spurs	Range Busters
January 15, 1941	Dead Man's Shoes	British film
January 20, 1941	You're Out of Luck	
February 10, 1941	The Kid's Last Ride	Range Busters
February 25, 1941	Ridin' the Cherokee Trail	
March 10, 1941	Flying Wild	East Side Kids
March 25, 1941	Sign of the Wolf	
April 10, 1941	Tumbledown Ranch in Arizona	Range Busters
April 18, 1941	Roar of the Press	
April 25, 1941	Invisible Ghost	distribution only; produced by Banner Pictures Corporation
May 5, 1941	At the Villa Rose	British film
May 10, 1941	The Pioneers	
May 14, 1941	King of the Zombies	
May 21, 1941	Redhead	
May 28, 1941	Silver Stallion	
June 4, 1941	Wrangler's Roost	Range Busters
June 11, 1941	The Gang's All Here	East Side Kids
June 30, 1941	Murder by Invitation	
July 19, 1941	Arizona Bound	Range Riders
July 19, 1941	Father Steps Out	
July 25, 1941	Wanderers of the West	
July 30, 1941	Fugitive Valley	Range Busters
August 1, 1941	Bowery Blitzkrieg	East Side Kids
August 8, 1941	The Deadly Game	
August 8, 1941	Dynamite Canyon	
August 14, 1941	40,000 Horsemen	Australian film
August 29, 1941	Saddle Mountain Roundup	Range Busters
September 2, 1941	Gentleman from Dixie	
September 12, 1941	Let's Go Collegiate	
September 26, 1941	The Gunman from Bodie	Rough Riders
October 17, 1941	The Driftin' Kid	
October 17, 1941	Top Sergeant Mulligan	
October 17, 1941	Uncle Joe	
October 19, 1941	Tonto Basin Outlaws	Range Busters
October 24, 1941	Spooks Run Wild	East Side Kids
October 31, 1941	Riding the Sunset Trail	
November 7, 1941	Zis Boom Bah	
November 21, 1941	Double Trouble	
November 21, 1941	Underground Rustlers	Range Busters
December 5, 1941	Borrowed Hero	
December 5, 1941	Lone Star Law Men	
December 12, 1941	Riot Squad	
December 14, 1941	I Killed That Man	produced by King Brothers Productions
December 25, 1941	Forbidden Trails	Rough Riders
January 2, 1942	Freckles Comes Home	
January 6, 1942	Private Snuffy Smith	
January 9, 1942	Road to Happiness	
January 9, 1942	Thunder River Feud	Range Busters
January 6, 1942	Law of the Jungle	
January 23, 1942	Man from Headquarters	
January 26, 1942	Meet Maxwell Archer	British film
January 30, 1942	Below the Border	Rough Riders
February 13, 1942	Western Mail	
February 15, 1942	This Man in Paris	British film
February 20, 1942	Mr. Wise Guy	East Side Kids
February 27, 1942	Rock River Renegades	Range Busters
March 1, 1942	The Silent Battle	British film
March 6, 1942	Black Dragons	distribution only; produced by Banner Pictures Corporation
March 6, 1942	Arizona Roundup	
March 13, 1942	Man with Two Lives	
March 20, 1942	Klondike Fury	
March 27, 1942	Ghost Town Law	Rough Riders
April 1, 1942	Tower of Terror	British film
April 17, 1942	So's Your Aunt Emma	
April 24, 1942	Boot Hill Bandits	Range Busters
May 1, 1942	Where Trails End	
May 8, 1942	The Corpse Vanishes	distribution only; produced by Banner Pictures Corporation
May 15, 1942	She's in the Army	
May 22, 1942	Let's Get Tough!	East Side Kids
May 22, 1942	Down Texas Way	Rough Riders
June 5, 1942	One Thrilling Night	
June 12, 1942	Texas Trouble Shooters	Range Busters
June 26, 1942	Rubber Racketeers	produced by King Brothers Productions
July 3, 1942	Lure of the Islands	
August 7, 1942	Smart Alecks	East Side Kids
August 14, 1942	Hillbilly Blitzkrieg	
August 18, 1942	Isle of Missing Men	
August 21, 1942	Riders of the West	Rough Riders
September 4, 1942	Arizona Stagecoach	Range Busters
September 25, 1942	Police Bullets	
October 2, 1942	Phantom Killer	
October 2, 1942	West of the Law	Rough Riders
October 9, 1942	Foreign Agent	
October 16, 1942	Texas to Bataan	Range Busters
October 18, 1942	King of the Stallions	
October 23, 1942	Criminal Investigator	
October 30, 1942	Bowery at Midnight	distribution only; produced by Banner Pictures Corporation
November 13, 1942	War Dogs	
November 20, 1942	'Neath Brooklyn Bridge	East Side Kids
November 27, 1942	The Living Ghost	
December 4, 1942	Trail Riders	Range Busters
December 11, 1942	Rhythm Parade	
December 18, 1942	Dawn on the Great Divide	
January 8, 1943	Two Fisted Justice	Range Busters
January 15, 1943	Silent Witness	
January 29, 1943	The Crime Smasher	Range Busters
January 29, 1943	You Can't Beat the Law	
February 5, 1943	Kid Dynamite	East Side Kids
February 19, 1943	Haunted Ranch	Range Busters
February 25, 1943	Silver Skates	
March 5, 1943	The Ape Man	distribution only; produced by Banner Pictures Corporation
March 25, 1943	Land of Hunted Men	Range Busters
April 2, 1943	The Ghost Rider	
April 16, 1943	Wild Horse Stampede	First of the Trail Blazers series
April 23, 1943	Clancy Street Boys	East Side Kids
May 14, 1943	I Escaped from the Gestapo	produced by King Brothers Productions
June 4, 1943	Cowboy Commandos	Range Busters
June 11, 1943	Sarong Girl	
July 9, 1943	Spy Train	
July 10, 1943	The Stranger from Pecos	
July 23, 1943	Wings Over the Pacific	
July 23, 1943	Ghosts on the Loose	East Side Kids
August 3, 1943	Six Gun Gospel	
August 27, 1943	Melody Parade	
August 27, 1943	Black Market Rustlers	Range Busters
September 10, 1943	Here Comes Kelly	
September 17, 1943	Revenge of the Zombies	
September 17, 1943	Smart Guy	
September 24, 1943	Spotlight Scandals	
October 8, 1943	Blazing Guns	
October 12, 1943	The Law Rides Again	Trail Blazers
October 15, 1943	Outlaws of Stampede Pass	
October 22, 1943	The Unknown Guest	
October 29, 1943	Bullets and Saddles	
October 29, 1943	Mr. Muggs Steps Out	East Side Kids
November 5, 1943	Mystery of the 13th Guest	
November 12, 1943	Nearly Eighteen	
November 16, 1943	Campus Rhythm	
November 19, 1943	Women in Bondage	
November 24, 1943	Where Are Your Children?	
November 26, 1943	The Texas Kid	
December 3, 1943	Death Valley Rangers	Trail Blazers
December 16, 1943	The Sultan's Daughter	
January 17, 1944	Westward Bound	Trail Blazers
January 31, 1944	What a Man!	
January 31, 1944	Raiders of the Border	
February 14, 1944	Charlie Chan in the Secret Service	First Monogram Charlie Chan film
February 18, 1944	Million Dollar Kid	
February 21, 1944	Voodoo Man	distribution only; produced by Banner Pictures Corporation
February 21, 1944	Arizona Whirlwind	
March 7, 1944	Sweethearts of the U.S.A.	
March 28, 1944	Partners of the Trail	
April 11, 1944	Lady, Let's Dance	
April 13, 1944	Hot Rhythm	
April 21, 1944	When Strangers Marry	produced by King Brothers Productions
April 25, 1944	Law Men	distribution; produced by Great Western Productions
April 29, 1944	Outlaw Trail	Trail Blazers
May 20, 1944	Detective Kitty O'Day	
May 20, 1944	The Chinese Cat	Charlie Chan
June 3, 1944	Follow the Leader	East Side Kids
June 10, 1944	Sonora Stagecoach	Trail Blazers
June 24, 1944	Range Law	
June 27, 1944	Are These Our Parents?	
July 4, 1944	A Fig Leaf for Eve	
July 8, 1944	Johnny Doesn't Live Here Any More	produced by King Brothers Productions
July 17, 1944	Return of the Ape Man	distribution only; produced by Banner Pictures Corporation
July 22, 1944	Block Busters	East Side Kids
July 23, 1944	Three of a Kind	distribution only; produced by Banner Pictures Corporation
July 29, 1944	Call of the Jungle	
July 29, 1944	Marked Trails	
August 5, 1944	West of the Rio Grande	
August 19, 1944	Black Magic	Charlie Chan
August 26, 1944	Leave It to the Irish	
August 26, 1944	The Utah Kid	Trail Blazers
September 2, 1944	Oh, What a Night	
September 16, 1944	Land of the Outlaws	
September 23, 1944	Shadow of Suspicion	
September 30, 1944	Trigger Law	Trail Blazers
October 7, 1944	A WAVE, a WAC and a Marine	
November 4, 1944	Law of the Valley	
November 10, 1944	Enemy of Women	
November 17, 1944	Ghost Guns	
November 18, 1944	Alaska	
November 25, 1944	Bowery Champs	East Side Kids
December 1, 1944	Song of the Range	
December 6, 1944	Army Wives	
December 17, 1944	Crazy Knights	
January 15, 1945	The Navajo Trail	
January 19, 1945	Adventures of Kitty O'Day	
January 26, 1945	The Jade Mask	Charlie Chan
January 26, 1945	Forever Yours	
February 16, 1945	The Cisco Kid Returns	Cisco Kid
February 16, 1945	Gun Smoke	
February 16, 1945	There Goes Kelly	
February 24, 1945	Docks of New York	East Side Kids
March 2, 1945	Fashion Model	
April 6, 1945	Dillinger	produced by King Brothers Productions
April 6, 1945	G. I. Honeymoon	
May 2, 1945	Trouble Chasers	
May 11, 1945	The Scarlet Clue	Charlie Chan
May 15, 1945	In Old New Mexico	Cisco Kid
May 18, 1945	Stranger from Santa Fe	
May 27, 1945	China's Little Devils	
June 2, 1945	Springtime in Texas	
June 25, 1945	Flame of the West	
July 15, 1945	Mr. Muggs Rides Again	East Side Kids
August 11, 1945	Saddle Serenade	
August 18, 1945	Divorce	
August 18, 1945	Come Out Fighting	East Side Kids
September 8, 1945	South of the Rio Grande	Cisco Kid
September 29, 1945	The Shanghai Cobra	Charlie Chan
October 6, 1945	Sunbonnet Sue	
October 13, 1945	Sensation Hunters	(Note: In the public domain)
October 20, 1945	The Lost Trail	
November 3, 1945	Riders of the Dawn	
November 8, 1945	Allotment Wives	
November 24, 1945	Frontier Feud	
December 8, 1945	The Lonesome Trail	
December 13, 1945	The Strange Mr. Gregory	
December 15, 1945	Black Market Babies	
January 12, 1946	Border Bandits	
January 12, 1946	Live Wires	First of The Bowery Boys films
January 19, 1946	The Face of Marble	
January 26, 1946	Drifting Along	
February 2, 1946	The Red Dragon	Charlie Chan
February 16, 1946	Moon Over Montana	
February 16, 1946	The Shadow Returns	First of the Shadow films
March 2, 1946	Fear	
March 2, 1946	The Haunted Mine	
March 16, 1946	Swing Parade of 1946	
March 30, 1946	The Gay Cavalier	
April 20, 1946	West of the Alamo	
May 11, 1946	Junior Prom	First of The Teen Agers series
May 25, 1946	Behind the Mask	The Shadow
May 25, 1946	Dark Alibi	Charlie Chan
May 27, 1946	Under Arizona Skies	
May 28, 1946	Joe Palooka, Champ	
June 8, 1946	The Gentleman from Texas	
June 15, 1946	Suspense	produced by King Brothers Productions
June 15, 1946	South of Monterey	Cisco Kid
June 22, 1946	In Fast Company	The Bowery Boys
June 26, 1946	Trail to Mexico	
June 27, 1946	Shadows Over Chinatown	Charlie Chan
June 28, 1946	Freddie Steps Out	The Teen Agers
July 6, 1946	Strange Voyage	
July 20, 1946	Bowery Bombshell	The Bowery Boys
August 3, 1946	Below the Deadline	
August 17, 1946	The Missing Lady	
August 17, 1946	The Shadow	
August 24, 1946	Spook Busters	The Bowery Boys
September 7, 1946	High School Hero	The Teen Agers
September 14, 1946	Decoy	
September 21, 1946	Trigger Fingers	
October 5, 1946	Gentleman Joe Palooka	
October 12, 1946	Dangerous Money	Charlie Chan
October 16, 1946	Shadows on the Range	
October 24, 1946	Don't Gamble with Strangers	
November 9, 1946	Beauty and the Bandit	
November 16, 1946	Silver Range	
November 16, 1946	Wife Wanted	
November 16, 1946	Sweetheart of Sigma Chi	
November 20, 1946	Ginger	
November 23, 1946	Bringing Up Father	(Note: Owned by King Features Syndicate) First Maggie and Jiggs film
November 30, 1946	The Trap	Charlie Chan
December 7, 1946	Mr. Hex	The Bowery Boys
December 28, 1946	Song of the Sierras	
January 11, 1947	Riding the California Trail	
January 18, 1947	Raiders of the South	
February 8, 1947	Vacation Days	
February 8, 1947	Rainbow Over the Rockies	
February 15, 1947	Valley of Fear	
March 15, 1947	Fall Guy	
March 22, 1947	The Guilty	
March 29, 1947	Trailing Danger	
April 15, 1947	Six-Gun Serenade	
April 26, 1947	Land of the Lawless	
May 9, 1947	Violence	co-production with Bernhard-Brandt Productions
May 10, 1947	Hard Boiled Mahoney	The Bowery Boys
May 13, 1947	Sarge Goes to College	The Teen Agers
May 24, 1947	The Law Comes to Gunsight	
May 31, 1947	Song of the Wasteland	
June 21, 1947	High Conquest	
June 28, 1947	Code of the Saddle	
July 16, 1947	Flashing Guns	
July 19, 1947	Kilroy Was Here	
July 26, 1947	Thunderbolt	
September 6, 1947	Robin Hood of Monterey	
September 13, 1947	News Hounds	The Bowery Boys
September 13, 1947	High Tide	
September 20, 1947	Joe Palooka in the Knockout	
October 4, 1947	Ridin' Down the Trail	
October 27, 1947	Prairie Express	
November 1, 1947	Louisiana	
November 8, 1947	King of the Bandits	
November 22, 1947	Bowery Buckaroos	The Bowery Boys
December 6, 1947	The Chinese Ring	Charlie Chan
December 12, 1947	Jiggs and Maggie in Society	
December 20, 1947	Gun Talk	
January 3, 1948	Smart Politics	The Teen Agers
January 17, 1948	Song of the Drifter	
January 17, 1948	Rocky	
January 31, 1948	Overland Trails	
February 7, 1948	Joe Palooka in Fighting Mad	
February 14, 1948	Perilous Waters	
March 7, 1948	Angels' Alley	The Bowery Boys
March 21, 1948	Docks of New Orleans	Charlie Chan
March 28, 1948	Oklahoma Blues	
April 4, 1948	Campus Sleuth	The Teen Agers
April 11, 1948	French Leave	
April 11, 1948	Crossed Trails	
April 26, 1948	The Rangers Ride	
May 6, 1948	Partners of the Sunset	
May 16, 1948	Frontier Agent	
May 23, 1948	I Wouldn't Be in Your Shoes	
June 6, 1948	Range Renegades	
June 13, 1948	Stage Struck	
June 20, 1948	Triggerman	
June 27, 1948	Jinx Money	The Bowery Boys
July 11, 1948	Cowboy Cavalier	
July 11, 1948	Shanghai Chest	Charlie Chan
July 18, 1948	Back Trail	
July 25, 1948	Sixteen Fathoms Deep	
August 8, 1948	Michael O'Halloran	
August 15, 1948	The Fighting Ranger	
August 22, 1948	Silver Trails	
August 29, 1948	The Golden Eye	Charlie Chan
September 5, 1948	Music Man	The Teen Agers
September 19, 1948	Joe Palooka in Winner Take All	
October 3, 1948	The Sheriff of Medicine Bow	
October 10, 1948	Smugglers' Cove	The Bowery Boys
October 24, 1948	Outlaw Brand	
October 30, 1948	Incident	
November 7, 1948	Gunning for Justice	
November 21, 1948	Courtin' Trouble	
November 28, 1948	Kidnapped	
December 12, 1948	Hidden Danger	
December 12, 1948	Jiggs and Maggie in Court	
December 19, 1948	The Feathered Serpent	Charlie Chan
January 2, 1949	Trouble Makers	
January 9, 1949	Crashing Thru	
January 24, 1949	Shadows of the West	
January 28, 1949	Incident	
January 30, 1949	Gun Runner	
February 13, 1949	Henry, the Rainmaker	
February 20, 1949	Law of the West	
March 6, 1949	Joe Palooka in the Big Fight	
March 13, 1949	Gun Law Justice	
March 17, 1949	Fighting Fools	The Bowery Boys
March 20, 1949	Bomba, the Jungle Boy	
April 7, 1949	Trails End	
April 10, 1949	Tuna Clipper	
April 27, 1949	Sky Dragon	Charlie Chan
May 15, 1949	Across the Rio Grande	
May 29, 1949	Mississippi Rhythm	
June 5, 1949	West of El Dorado	
June 12, 1949	Leave It to Henry	
June 26, 1949	Hold That Baby!	The Bowery Boys
July 10, 1949	Brand of Fear	
July 16, 1949	Range Justice	
July 17, 1949	Forgotten Women	
July 28, 1949	Incident	
July 31, 1949	Trail of the Yukon	First Corporal Rod Webb film
August 12, 1949	Haunted Trails	
August 14, 1949	Joe Palooka in the Counterpunch	
August 28, 1949	Jiggs and Maggie in Jackpot Jitters	
September 15, 1949	Roaring Westward	
September 25, 1949	Angels in Disguise	The Bowery Boys
October 2, 1949	Black Midnight	
October 9, 1949	Western Renegades	
October 30, 1949	The Wolf Hunters	Corporal Rod Webb
November 13, 1949	Riders of the Dusk	
November 27, 1949	Master Minds	The Bowery Boys
December 4, 1949	Lawless Code	
December 18, 1949	Bomba on Panther Island	Bomba the Jungle Boy
December 24, 1949	Range Land	

=== 1950s ===
Release date	Title	Notes
January 19, 1950	Fence Riders	
January 22, 1950	Blue Grass of Kentucky	
February 5, 1950	Joe Palooka Meets Humphrey	
February 12, 1950	Blonde Dynamite	The Bowery Boys
February 19, 1950	West of Wyoming	
March 5, 1950	Young Daniel Boone	
March 12, 1950	Over the Border	
March 19, 1950	Killer Shark	
March 25, 1950	Square Dance Katy	
April 9, 1950	Gunslingers	
April 23, 1950	Jiggs and Maggie Out West	
April 30, 1950	Six Gun Mesa	
May 7, 1950	Father Makes Good	
May 14, 1950	Lucky Losers	The Bowery Boys
June 4, 1950	Joe Palooka in Humphrey Takes a Chance	
June 18, 1950	Sideshow	
June 25, 1950	The Lost Volcano	Bomba, the Jungle Boy
July 2, 1950	Arizona Territory	distribution; produced by Transwestern Pictures
July 10, 1950	A Modern Marriage	
July 16, 1950	Snow Dog	Corporal Rod Webb
July 29, 1950	County Fair	
August 13, 1950	Triple Trouble	The Bowery Boys
September 10, 1950	Big Timber	
September 17, 1950	Law of the Panhandle	
September 24, 1950	Bomba and the Hidden City	Bomba, the Jungle Boy
October 8, 1950	Cherokee Uprising	
October 20, 1950	Silver Raiders	distribution; produced by Transwestern Pictures
October 22, 1950	Hot Rod	
October 29, 1950	Blues Busters	The Bowery Boys
November 5, 1950	Joe Palooka in the Squared Circle	
November 26, 1950	Outlaw Gold	distribution; produced by Transwestern Pictures
December 3, 1950	Father's Wild Game	
December 10, 1950	Outlaws of Texas	
December 17, 1950	Call of the Klondike	Corporal Rod Webb
December 31, 1950	Sierra Passage	
January 14, 1951	Colorado Ambush	distribution; produced by Transwestern Pictures
January 24, 1951	Bowery Battalion	The Bowery Boys
January 28, 1951	Blue Blood	
February 4, 1951	Abilene Trail	
February 11, 1951	Rhythm Inn	
March 4, 1951	Navy Bound	
March 11, 1951	Man from Sonora	distribution; produced by Transwestern Pictures
March 25, 1951	The Lion Hunters	Bomba, the Jungle Boy
April 3, 1951	Dead or Alive	
April 8, 1951	Canyon Raiders	distribution; produced by Frontier Productions
April 29, 1951	Ghost Chasers	The Bowery Boys
May 6, 1951	Blazing Bullets	distribution; produced by Frontier Productions
May 13, 1951	Cavalry Scout	
May 20, 1951	According to Mrs. Hoyle	
May 27, 1951	Nevada Badmen	
June 10, 1951	Casa Manana	
June 17, 1951	Father Takes the Air	
June 17, 1951	Montana Desperado	distribution; produced by Frontier Productions
July 12, 1951	Yukon Manhunt	Corporal Rod Webb
July 15, 1951	Stagecoach Driver	
July 29, 1951	Let's Go Navy!	The Bowery Boys
August 12, 1951	The Highwayman	
August 19, 1951	Oklahoma Justice	distribution; produced by Frontier Productions
September 16, 1951	Joe Palooka in Triple Cross	
October 7, 1951	Whistling Hills	distribution; produced by Frontier Productions
October 10, 1951	Yellow Fin	
October 25, 1951	The Longhorn	
October 28, 1951	Elephant Stampede	Bomba, the Jungle Boy
November 7, 1951	Lawless Cowboys	distribution; produced by Frontier Productions
November 11, 1951	Flight to Mars	
November 18, 1951	Crazy Over Horses	The Bowery Boys
December 2, 1951	Texas Lawmen	distribution; produced by Frontier Productions
December 9, 1951	Northwest Territory	Corporal Rod Webb
December 30, 1951	Stage to Blue River	distribution; produced by Silvermine Productions
January 6, 1952	The Steel Fist	
January 27, 1952	Texas City	distribution; produced by Silvermine Productions
February 3, 1952	Night Raiders	distribution; produced by Silvermine Productions
February 10, 1952	Fort Osage	in Cinecolor
February 24, 1952	Aladdin and His Lamp	
February 24, 1952	Waco	
March 9, 1952	Rodeo	
March 23, 1952	Hold That Line	The Bowery Boys
March 30, 1952	Man from the Black Hills	distribution; produced by Silvermine Productions
April 13, 1952	The Gunman	distribution; produced by Silvermine Productions
April 27, 1952	Wild Stallion	
May 6, 1952	African Treasure	Bomba, the Jungle Boy
May 11, 1952	Desert Pursuit	
May 30, 1952	Kansas Territory	
June 15, 1952	Gold Fever	
June 29, 1952	Here Come the Marines	The Bowery Boys
July 20, 1952	Dead Man's Trail	
July 27, 1952	Sea Tiger	
August 10, 1952	Montana Incident	distribution; produced by Silvermine Productions
August 24, 1952	The Rose Bowl Story	
August 31, 1952	Yukon Gold	Corporal Rod Webb
September 7, 1952	Fargo	
September 21, 1952	Feudin' Fools	The Bowery Boys
October 5, 1952	Army Bound	
October 12, 1952	Canyon Ambush	
October 19, 1952	Arctic Flight	
November 9, 1952	Wyoming Roundup	distribution; produced by Silvermine Productions
November 23, 1952	No Holds Barred	The Bowery Boys
December 7, 1952	Bomba and the Jungle Girl	Bomba, the Jungle Boy
May 31, 1953	Roar of the Crowd	
September 13, 1953	Mexican Manhunt	
October 11, 1953	Hot News	

== Allied Artists Pictures ==
=== 1940s ===
Release date	Title	Notes
April 19, 1947	It Happened on Fifth Avenue	
September 16, 1947	Black Gold	
November 25, 1947	The Gangster	Co-production with King Brothers Productions
January 31, 1948	Song of My Heart	
February 22, 1948	Panhandle	
April 7, 1948	The Hunted	co-production with Scott R. Dunlap Productions
April 30, 1948	Smart Woman	co-production with Constance Bennett Productions
May 30, 1948	The Dude Goes West	co-production with King Brothers Productions
July 26, 1948	The Babe Ruth Story	co-production with Roy Del Ruth Productions
November 26, 1948	Strike It Rich	
January 22, 1949	Bad Men of Tombstone	co-production with King Brothers Productions
February 22, 1949	Bad Boy	co-production with Paul Short Productions and Variety Clubs International
May 1, 1949	Stampede	co-production with Scott R. Dunlap Productions
June 26, 1949	Massacre River	co-production with Windsor Pictures Corporation
December 19, 1949	There's a Girl in My Heart	

=== 1950s ===
Release date	Title	Notes
November 12, 1950	Southside 1-1000	co-production with King Brothers Productions
December 24, 1950	Short Grass	co-production with Scott R. Dunlap Productions
April 14, 1951	I Was an American Spy	
September 30, 1951	Disc Jockey	
March 6, 1952	Jet Job	
July 6, 1952	Wagons West	co-produced by Silvermine Productions
October 26, 1952	Battle Zone	co-production with Walter Wanger Productions
October 26, 1952	Flat Top	
December 1, 1952	The Maverick	
December 19, 1952	Torpedo Alley	
December 28, 1952	Hiawatha	
January 11, 1953	Star of Texas	
January 18, 1953	Fangs of the Arctic	Corporal Rod Webb
February 1, 1953	Tangier Incident	
February 15, 1953	Jalopy	The Bowery Boys
February 22, 1953	Kansas Pacific	co-production with Walter Wanger Productions
March 8, 1953	White Lightning	
March 22, 1953	The Homesteaders	
March 29, 1953	Fort Vengeance	co-production with Walter Wanger Productions
April 1, 1953	Trail Blazers	
April 12, 1953	The Marksman	
April 26, 1953	Cow Country	
May 10, 1953	Rebel City	
May 24, 1953	Loose in London	The Bowery Boys
June 14, 1953	Murder Without Tears	produced by William F. Broidy Pictures Corporation
June 21, 1953	Safari Drums	Bomba, the Jungle Boy
June 25, 1953	Son of Belle Starr	
July 12, 1953	Northern Patrol	Corporal Rod Webb
July 26, 1953	The Maze	
August 9, 1953	Topeka	
August 14, 1953	Affair in Monte Carlo	produced by ABPC
August 14, 1953	Clipped Wings	The Bowery Boys
September 20, 1953	Fighting Lawman	
September 27, 1953	The Royal African Rifles	
October 25, 1953	Jennifer	
November 8, 1953	Jack Slade	
November 15, 1953	Vigilante Terror	
November 29, 1953	Fighter Attack	
December 6, 1953	Private Eyes	
December 20, 1953	Texas Bad Man	
January 10, 1954	The Golden Idol	Bomba, the Jungle Boy
January 17, 1954	Yukon Vengeance	Corporal Rod Webb
January 27, 1954	Highway Dragnet	Produced by Roger Corman
January 31, 1954	World for Ransom	
February 21, 1954	Bitter Creek	
February 28, 1954	Riot in Cell Block 11	
March 7, 1954	Paris Playboys	The Bowery Boys
March 21, 1954	Dragonfly Squadron	
March 28, 1954	Loophole	
April 4, 1954	Pride of the Blue Grass	
April 25, 1954	Arrow in the Dust	
May 9, 1954	The Forty-Niners	
June 6, 1954	The Bowery Boys Meet the Monsters	
June 20, 1954	The Desperado	
July 18, 1954	Young and Willing	British film(UK: The Weak and the Wicked)
July 28, 1954	Return from the Sea	
August 8, 1954	Security Risk	
August 22, 1954	Killer Leopard	Bomba, the Jungle Boy
September 5, 1954	Jungle Gents	The Bowery Boys
September 12, 1954	Two Guns and a Badge	
October 3, 1954	The Human Jungle	
October 20, 1954	The Bob Mathias Story	
November 7, 1954	Target Earth	
November 21, 1954	Cry Vengeance	
December 5, 1954	Port of Hell	(Note: Currently owned by Herbert Jovy)
December 19, 1954	Tonight's the Night	British film(UK: Happy Ever After)
January 2, 1955	Bowery to Bagdad	The Bowery Boys
January 23, 1955	Treasure of Ruby Hills	
February 13, 1955	The Big Combo	distribution only; co-production with Security Pictures & Theodora Productions
February 27, 1955	Murder Is My Beat	co-production with Masthead Productions
March 13, 1955	Dial Red O	
March 20, 1955	The Big Tip Off	
March 27, 1955	Seven Angry Men	
April 10, 1955	An Annapolis Story	
April 17, 1955	High Society	The Bowery Boys
April 24, 1955	Shotgun	
May 15, 1955	Las Vegas Shakedown	
June 12, 1955	Lord of the Jungle	Bomba, the Jungle Boy
June 15, 1955	Finger Man	
June 19, 1955	Case of the Red Monkey	British film
July 3, 1955	Wichita	CinemaScope
July 17, 1955	Betrayed Women	
July 31, 1955	Spy Chasers	The Bowery Boys
August 14, 1955	The Phenix City Story	
August 28, 1955	Night Freight	
August 28, 1955	No Place to Hide	Philippine US co-production
September 11, 1955	The Dark Avenger	British film in CinemaScope
September 18, 1955	Jail Busters	The Bowery Boys
October 9, 1955	The Return of Jack Slade	co-production with Lindsley Parsons Picture Corporation
October 23, 1955	Bobby Ware Is Missing	
October 25, 1955	Grand National Night	British film
November 6, 1955	Toughest Man Alive	
November 27, 1955	Paris Follies of 1956	
December 4, 1955	Shack Out on 101	
December 18, 1955	Sudden Danger	
December 25, 1955	At Gunpoint	
January 8, 1956	Dig That Uranium	The Bowery Boys
January 29, 1956	Confession	British film
February 5, 1956	Invasion of the Body Snatchers	
March 4, 1956	Timeslip	British film
March 25, 1956	World Without End	CinemaScope
March 25, 1956	Indestructible Man	
April 15, 1956	The Come On	
April 22, 1956	Crashing Las Vegas	The Bowery Boys
May 6, 1956	Thunderstorm	British (Note: Owned by StudioCanal and Warner Bros. (via Lorimar Motion Pictures))
May 20, 1956	Navy Wife	
May 27, 1956	Screaming Eagles	
June 10, 1956	Crime in the Streets	
June 16, 1956	The Naked Hills	
June 29, 1956	The First Texan	co-production with Walter Mirisch Productions; Filmed in CinemaScope
July 6, 1956	Three for Jamie Dawn	
July 22, 1956	Magnificent Roughnecks	
July 22, 1956	Hold Back the Night	
August 5, 1956	Canyon River	co-production with Scott R. Dunlap Productions; Filmed in CinemaScope
September 2, 1956	Strange Intruder	
September 12, 1956	The Young Guns	
September 16, 1956	Fighting Trouble	The Bowery Boys
September 30, 1956	Calling Homicide	
October 14, 1956	Yaqui Drums	
October 28, 1956	The Cruel Tower	
November 25, 1956	Friendly Persuasion	co-production with B-M Productions
December 9, 1956	High Terrace	British film
December 23, 1956	Hot Shots	The Bowery Boys
January 6, 1957	Chain of Evidence	
February 10, 1957	Attack of the Crab Monsters	Produced by Roger Corman
February 10, 1957	Not of This Earth	
February 17, 1957	Last of the Badmen	CinemaScope
February 24, 1957	Hold That Hypnotist	The Bowery Boys
April 14, 1957	The Badge of Marshal Brennan	
April 14, 1957	Footsteps in the Night	
April 28, 1957	Dragoon Wells Massacre	
May 5, 1957	The Persuader	
May 12, 1957	Destination 60,000	
May 19, 1957	The Oklahoman	
May 28, 1957	Let's Be Happy	British film in CinemaScope
June 2, 1957	Spook Chasers	The Bowery Boys
June 9, 1957	Hot Rod Rumble	
June 9, 1957	Calypso Joe	
June 30, 1957	Love in the Afternoon	
July 21, 1957	Dino	
July 28, 1957	The Cyclops	co-production with B&H Productions
July 28, 1957	The Daughter of Dr. Jekyll	
August 11, 1957	Portland Exposé	
August 25, 1957	From Hell It Came	
August 25, 1957	The Disembodied	
September 15, 1957	Death in Small Doses	
September 15, 1957	Teenage Doll	
September 17, 1957	Naked in the Sun	
September 22, 1957	Undersea Girl	
October 1, 1957	Affair in Havana	produced by Dudley Pictures International Corporation of Cuba
October 6, 1957	Looking for Danger	The Bowery Boys
October 27, 1957	Gun Battle at Monterey	Co-production with C.B Pictures
November 3, 1957	The Hunchback of Notre Dame	European co-production
November 17, 1957	The Tall Stranger	CinemaScope
November 24, 1957	Sabu and the Magic Ring	
December 22, 1957	Up in Smoke	The Bowery Boys
December 29, 1957	Oregon Passage	CinemaScope
January 26, 1958	The Rawhide Trail	
February 16, 1958	In the Money	The Bowery Boys
February 16, 1958	Man from God's Country	CinemaScope
February 23, 1958	The Bride and the Beast	
February 23, 1958	The Beast of Budapest	
March 16, 1958	Seven Guns to Mesa	
March 30, 1958	Cole Younger, Gunfighter	CinemaScope
April 13, 1958	Hell's Five Hours	
April 27, 1958	Quantrill's Raiders	CinemaScope
May 11, 1958	Hong Kong Affair	
May 15, 1958	Snowfire	
May 15, 1958	War of the Satellites	Produced by Roger Corman
May 18, 1958	Attack of the 50 Foot Woman	
June 15, 1958	New Orleans After Dark	
June 21, 1958	Bullwhip	CinemaScope co-production with Romson Productions and William F. Broidy Productions
June 22, 1958	Never Love a Stranger	
July 6, 1958	The Littlest Hobo	
July 20, 1958	Spy in the Sky!	
July 20, 1958	Frankenstein 1970	
August 17, 1958	The Cry Baby Killer	
August 17, 1958	Hot Car Girl	
September 7, 1958	Queen of Outer Space	Filmed in CinemaScope
September 21, 1958	Legion of the Doomed	
October 26, 1958	Wolf Larsen	
October 1958	Macabre	co-production with William Castle Productions
November 23, 1958	Joy Ride	
November 23, 1958	Unwed Mother	
December 7, 1958	Gunsmoke in Tucson	
December 21, 1958	Johnny Rocco	
December 21, 1958	Revolt in the Big House	
February 17, 1959	House on Haunted Hill	Co-production with William Castle Productions
February 17, 1959	The Cosmic Man	Co-production with Futuna Productions Inc.
March 1, 1959	Arson for Hire	
March 3, 1959	The Giant Behemoth	
March 25, 1959	Al Capone	
May 17, 1959	King of the Wild Stallions	CinemaScope
June 28, 1959	The Rebel Set	
June 28, 1959	Speed Crazy	
July 5, 1959	The Big Circus	
July 26, 1959	Battle Flame	
July 26, 1959	Surrender - Hell!	Filmed in the Philippines
August 9, 1959	Face of Fire	
August 9, 1959	The Bat	Co-production with Liberty Pictures (Note: Owned by Disney (via ABC))
November 1, 1959	Crime and Punishment U.S.A.	
November 25, 1959	The Atomic Submarine	

=== 1960s ===
Release date	Title	Notes
January 5, 1960	The Purple Gang	
February 12, 1960	Beast from Haunted Cave	
February 27, 1960	The Hypnotic Eye	
March 18, 1960	I Passed for White	
April 2, 1960	Bluebeard's Ten Honeymoons	British film
May 22, 1960	Heroes Die Young	
July 5, 1960	Raymie	
July 27, 1960	Pay or Die	
August 24, 1960	Sex Kittens Go to College	
September 20, 1960	Caltiki – The Immortal Monster	Italian film
September 22, 1960	Tormented	Co-production with Cheviot Productions
September 30, 1960	Hell to Eternity	Filmed on Okinawa
November 5, 1960	The Plunderers	co-production with Scott R. Dunlap Productions
December 5, 1960	Herod the Great	European co-production
January 29, 1961	Look in Any Window	
March 15, 1961	Operation Eichmann	
March 26, 1961	Dondi	
May 1, 1961	The Bridge	West German film
May 14, 1961	Angel Baby	
May 28, 1961	David and Goliath	
June 11, 1961	The Big Bankroll	
June 25, 1961	Three Moves to Freedom	West German film
July 9, 1961	Armored Command	Filmed in West Germany
August 13, 1961	Twenty Plus Two	
November 22, 1961	The George Raft Story	
December 14, 1961	El Cid (Note: Owned by the estate of Samuel Bronston, with distribution rights presumably licensed to either Spyglass Media Group or Lionsgate)	Filmed in Spain
February 4, 1962	The Bashful Elephant	
March 21, 1962	Hitler	
April 22, 1962	Hands of a Stranger	
April 29, 1962	The Big Wave	Distribution only; American-Japanese co-production
May 20, 1962	Payroll	British film
May 27, 1962	Rider on a Dead Horse	
June 1962	The Bloody Brood	Canadian film
June 20, 1962	Confessions of an Opium Eater	
July 20, 1962	The Frightened City	British film
September 15, 1962	Convicts 4	
November 12, 1962	Billy Budd	British film
April 27, 1963	The Day of the Triffids	British film
May 15, 1963	Black Zoo	
May 29, 1963	55 Days at Peking	Filmed in Spain
August 28, 1963	The Gun Hawk	co-production with Bern-Field Productions
September 11, 1963	Shock Corridor	distribution only; produced by F&F Productions
October 9, 1963	Cry of Battle	Filmed in the Philippines
October 23, 1963	War Is Hell	
November 6, 1963	Gunfight at Comanche Creek	
November 27, 1963	Soldier in the Rain	
February 5, 1964	A Yank in Viet-Nam	Filmed in South Viet Nam
April 8, 1964	The Strangler	
April 28, 1964	Never Put it in Writing	Filmed in Ireland
May 2, 1964	The Thin Red Line	Filmed in Spain
June 4, 1964	The Secret Door	Filmed in Portugal
July 5, 1964	Stop Train 349	European co-production
August 19, 1964	Master Spy	British film
September 1964	The Devil's Bedroom	
October 11, 1964	Blood on the Arrow	
October 29, 1964	The Naked Kiss	co-production with F&F Productions
October 30, 1964	Racing Fever	
March 31, 1965	Taffy and the Jungle Hunter	
April 6, 1965	Mara of the Wilderness	distribution only; produced by Unicorn Films
April 7, 1965	Blood and Black Lace	Italian film
April 20, 1965	The Pawnbroker	co-production with American International Pictures
April 25, 1965	Young Dillinger	
April 25, 1965	Finger on the Trigger	Spanish Western
April 28, 1965	The Fool Killer	
May 1, 1965	Curse of the Voodoo	British film
June 3, 1965	Tickle Me	
June 23, 1965	Gunmen of the Rio Grande	European co-production
September 8, 1965	Operation C.I.A.	Filmed in Thailand
September 8, 1965	City of Fear	European co-production
September 22, 1965	Frankenstein Meets the Space Monster	Filmed in Florida
October 27, 1965	The Desert Raven	
January 10, 1966	The Gentle Rain	
March 23, 1966	The Party's Over	British film
March 25, 1966	Oh! Those Most Secret Agents!	Italian film
May 11, 1966	Moonwolf	West German film shot in 1959
June 1, 1966	Disk-O-Tek Holiday	British film
July 5, 1966	Nightmare Castle	Italian film
July 12, 1966	A Man and a Woman	French film
March 1, 1967	Seven Vengeful Women	European co-production
May 1967	The Sorcerers	Made in Britain
November 1, 1967	Hot Rod Hullabaloo	
May 3, 1967	Bikini Paradise	European co-production
September 15, 1967	That Man George	French film
November 13, 1967	Island of the Doomed	European co-production
January 10, 1968	Belle de Jour	French film
June 9, 1968	The Man Outside	British film
July 26, 1968	Mission Mars	Filmed in Florida
October 4, 1968	Snow Treasure	
November 13, 1968	The Hooked Generation	
February 1969	The Candy Man	
March 1969	Ski Fever	German film made in 1966
April 1969	The Body Stealers	British film
June 10, 1969	Last Summer	
July 7, 1969	Marry Me! Marry Me!	French film
November 6, 1969	Trilogy	

=== 1970s ===
Release date	Title	Notes
1970	Amour	Danish film
1970	Attack at Dawn	Israeli film
1970	Operation Snafu	Italian film
1970	Spring and Port Wine	British film
February 10, 1970	End of the Road	
April 1970	Paddy	Irish film
May 25, 1970	The Head of the Family	French/Italian film
29 April 1970	Diary of a Schizophrenic Girl	Italian film
August 5, 1970	Eugenie… The Story of Her Journey into Perversion	European co-production
October 1970	The Blood Rose	French film
December 1970	Portraits of Women	Finnish film
March 1971	Beyond Love and Evil	French film
March 1971	Sex Isn't Sin	Canadian film
April 7, 1971	Shinbone Alley	Animated film
August 18, 1971	Romance of a Horsethief	European co-production
September 14, 1971	The Anonymous Venetian	Italian film
September 25, 1971	Come Together	Italian film
February 13, 1972	Cabaret	co-production with ABC Pictures
May 30, 1972	Fright	British film
November 13, 1973	And Millions Will Die	Australian film
December 16, 1973	Papillon	North American theatrical and television distribution only; co-production with Les Films Corona and General Production Company
1974	A Black Ribbon for Deborah	Italian film
January 1974	The Beguines	French-Italian co-production
June 26, 1974	Three the Hard Way	
July 24, 1974	The Internecine Project	British film
October 16, 1974	Gold	British film
February 9, 1975	A Brief Vacation	Italian film
August 1975	Who?	British film
September 10, 1975	Mitchell	
October 5, 1975	Conduct Unbecoming	British film
November 14, 1975	Story of O	French film
December 1975	That Lucky Touch	British-West German co-production
December 19, 1975	The Man Who Would Be King	co-production with Devon/Persky-Bright
June 1976	Zorro	Italian film
July 18, 1976	My Friends	Italian film
July 1976	The Dragon Dies Hard	Hong Kong film
November 10, 1976	The Next Man	
November 13, 1976	Alice, Sweet Alice	(Note: Owned by SGL Entertainment)
February 9, 1977	Twilight's Last Gleaming	co-production with Lorimar
May 8, 1977	Black and White in Color	French film (Note: Owned by MGM and Multicom Entertainment Group)
May 1977	Teenage Graffiti	
1978	China 9, Liberty 37	European co-production
February 9, 1978	The Betsy	North American distribution only; co-production with United Artists; last production film from Allied
November 11, 1978	The Wild Geese	British film; last distribution film from Allied Artists

== See also ==
- List of Republic Pictures films
- List of Producers Releasing Corporation films
- List of Tiffany Pictures films
