= The Ghost Rider (1943 film) =

1943 film by Wallace Fox

- Theatrical release poster
- Directed by: Wallace Fox
- Screenplay by: Adele Buffington
- Produced by: Scott R. Dunlap
- Starring: Johnny Mack Brown; Raymond Hatton; Harry Woods; Beverly Boyd; Tom Seidel; Edmund Cobb
- Cinematography: Harry Neumann
- Edited by: Carl Pierson
- Production company: Monogram Pictures
- Distributed by: Monogram Pictures
- Release date: April 2, 1943
- Running time: 58 minutes
- Country: United States
- Language: English

The Ghost Rider is a 1943 American Western film directed by Wallace Fox and written by Adele Buffington. This is the first film in the "Marshal Nevada Jack McKenzie" series, and stars Johnny Mack Brown as Jack McKenzie and Raymond Hatton as his sidekick Sandy Hopkins, with Harry Woods, Beverly Boyd, Tom Seidel and Edmund Cobb. The film was released on April 2, 1943, by Monogram Pictures.

== Cast ==
- Johnny Mack Brown as Nevada Jack McKenzie
- Raymond Hatton as Marshal Sandy Hopkins
- Harry Woods as Lash Edwards
- Beverly Boyd as Julie Wilson
- Tom Seidel as Joe McNally
- Edmund Cobb as Zach Saddler
- Bud Osborne as Lucky Howard
- George DeNormand as Red
- Bill Hunter as Jess
- Artie Ortego as Roy Kern
- Charles King as Steve Cook
- Milburn Morante as John Wilson
- Bill Nestell as Bill
- Jack Daley as Patrick McNally
- Horace B. Carpenter as Talkative Old-Timer
- Ray Miller as Scudder

== See also ==
The Nevada Jack McKenzie series

- The Ghost Rider (1943)
- The Stranger from Pecos (1943)
- Six Gun Gospel (1943)
- Outlaws of Stampede Pass (1943)
- The Texas Kid (1943)
- Raiders of the Border (1944)
- Partners of the Trail (1944)
- Law Men (1944)
- Range Law (1944)
- West of the Rio Grande (1944)
- Land of the Outlaws (1944)
- Law of the Valley (1944)
- Ghost Guns (1944)
- The Navajo Trail (1945)
- Gun Smoke (1945)
- Stranger from Santa Fe (1945)
- The Lost Trail (1945)
- Frontier Feud (1945)
- Border Bandits (1946)
- The Haunted Mine (1946)
