= West of the Rio Grande =

1944 film directed by Lambert Hillyer

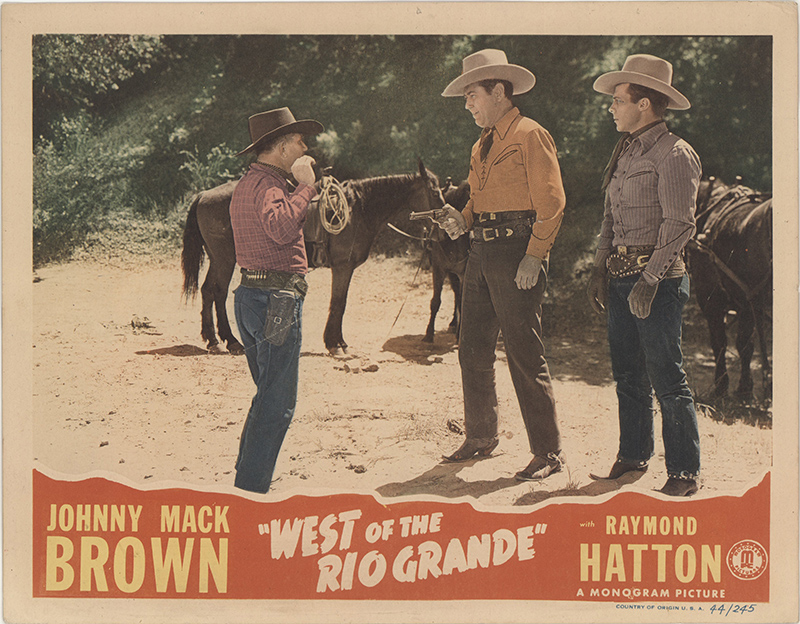
- Lobby card
- Directed by: Lambert Hillyer
- Written by: Betty Burbridge
- Produced by: Charles J. Bigelow
- Starring: Johnny Mack Brown; Raymond Hatton; Dennis Moore
- Cinematography: Arthur Martinelli
- Edited by: John C. Fuller
- Music by: Edward J. Kay
- Production company: Great Western Productions
- Distributed by: Monogram Pictures
- Release date: August 5, 1944 (US)
- Running time: 59 minutes
- Country: United States
- Language: English

West of the Rio Grande is a 1944 American Western film directed by Lambert Hillyer. This is the tenth film in the "Marshal Nevada Jack McKenzie" series, and stars Johnny Mack Brown as Jack McKenzie and Raymond Hatton as his sidekick Sandy Hopkins, with Dennis Moore, Christine McIntyre and Lloyd Ingraham. It was released on May 22, 1938.

== Cast ==
- Johnny Mack Brown as Nevada McKenzie
- Raymond Hatton as Sandy Hopkins
- Dennis Moore as Denny Boyd
- Christine McIntyre as Alice Darcy
- Lloyd Ingraham as Trooper Meade
- Kenneth MacDonald as Martin Keene
- Frank LaRue as Judge Darcy
- Art Fowler as Nate Todd
- Hugh Prosser as Lucky Cramer
- Edmund Cobb as Curly

== See also ==
The Nevada Jack McKenzie series

- The Ghost Rider (1943)
- The Stranger from Pecos (1943)
- Six Gun Gospel (1943)
- Outlaws of Stampede Pass (1943)
- The Texas Kid (1943)
- Raiders of the Border (1944)
- Partners of the Trail (1944)
- Law Men (1944)
- Range Law (1944)
- Land of the Outlaws (1944)
- Law of the Valley (1944)
- Ghost Guns (1944)
- The Navajo Trail (1945)
- Gun Smoke (1945)
- Stranger from Santa Fe (1945)
- The Lost Trail (1945)
- Frontier Feud (1945)
- Border Bandits (1946)
- The Haunted Mine (1946)
