= Partners of the Trail =

Partners of the Trail may refer to:

- Partners of the Trail (1931 film), an American western film directed by Wallace Fox
- Partners of the Trail (1944 film), an American western film directed by Lambert Hillyer
