= Adele Buffington =

American screenwriter (1900–1973)

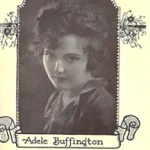
- Buffington in 1922
- Born: Adele Burgdorfer; February 12, 1900; St. Louis, Missouri, USA
- Died: November 23, 1973 (aged 73); Woodland Hills, California, USA
- Occupation: Screenwriter
- Years active: 1919–1958
- Spouse: Edward Vore (m. 1926)

Adele Buffington (born Adele Burgdorfer, and sometimes billed as Jess Bowers) was an American screenwriter of the silent and sound film eras of Hollywood.

== Early life ==
Adele was born in St. Louis to Adolph Burgdorfer and Mary Elizabeth Frederick, both of whom were immigrants from Germany. Before moving to Los Angeles at the age of 16, she worked in a movie theater, where she got to watch countless films. Once she arrived in Los Angeles, she got a job selling tickets at a theater in Hollywood; she worked as a treasurer for several theaters during this time period.

== Career ==
Before she was out of her teens, she sold her first screenplay, 1919's L’Apache, which was produced by Thomas Ince for the Famous Players–Lasky Corporation. After being added to the studio's scenario department, she continued to pen silent screenplays throughout the 1920s.

She easily transitioned into sound films, and in 1933 would become one of the founding members of the Screen Writers Guild. Over her 40-year career, she accumulated over 100 writing credits. Buffington's specialty was the Western genre, with almost half of her films falling into that category.

From the 1930s through the 1950s, she was one of the busiest writers in Hollywood. She wrote screenplays for most of the well-known Western actors of the period, including Tom Keene in Freighters of Destiny (1931), John Wayne in Haunted Gold (1932), Hoot Gibson in A Man's Land, Buck Jones in 1932's High Speed, Whip Wilson in Range Land (1949), and Tim Holt in Overland Telegraph (1951). She also occasionally wrote comedies for well-known actresses like Lucille Ball (Beauty for the Asking).

In the early 1940s, under her pseudonym, Jess Bowers, she wrote two separate Western series. The first was for Buck Jones, who appeared as his character, Buck Roberts, in eight "Rough Riders" films, beginning with Arizona Bound, and finishing with Dawn on the Great Divide in 1942. The second series was with Johnny Mack Brown, for his character Nevada Mackenzie, for which she authored 10 scripts between 1943 and 1945.

== Personal life ==
Buffington married Edward Vore in Los Angeles in 1926. As Adele De Vore, she wrote Fangs of Justice (1926) and Tongues of Scandal (1927).

== Filmography ==
(Per AFI database)

- L'Apache (1919)
- Empty Hearts (1924)
- The Bloodhound (1925)
- The Fighting Cub (1925)
- Love on the Rio Grande (1925)
- That Man Jack! (1925)
- The Cowboy and the Countess (1926)
- The Galloping Cowboy (1926)
- The Test of Donald Norton (1926)
- Blood Will Tell (1927)
- Broadway After Midnight (1927)
- Eager Lips (1927)
- The Broken Mask (1928)
- The Avenging Rider (1928)
- Bare Knees (1928)
- The Chorus Kid (1928)
- Coney Island (1928)
- Devil Dogs (1928)
- Midnight Life (1928)
- The Phantom City (1928)
- Queen of the Chorus (1928)
- The River Woman (1928)
- Times Square (1929)
- Extravagance (1930)
- Just Like Heaven (1930)
- The Swellhead (1930)
- Aloha (1931)
- Freighters of Destiny (1931)
- Forgotten Women (1931)
- Ghost Valley (1932)
- Haunted Gold (1932)
- A Man's Land (1932)
- Single-Handed Sanders (1932)
- The Iron Master (1933)
- High Speed (1932)
- The Eleventh Commandment (1933)
- West of Singapore (1933)
- Picture Brides (1933)
- Beggar's Holiday (1934)
- When Strangers Meet (1934)
- Cheaters (1934)
- Marrying Widows (1934)
- The Moonstone (1934)
- The Hell Cat (1934)
- Hi, Gaucho! (1935)
- Powdersmoke Range (1935)
- The Keeper of the Bees (1935)
- Lady Tubbs (1935) (uncredited)
- The Sheik Steps Out (1937)
- The Duke Comes Back (1937)
- Michael O'Halloran (1937)
- Circus Girl (1937)
- Tenth Avenue Kid (1938)
- Prison Nurse (1938)
- Beauty for the Asking (1939)
- Arizona Bound (1941) (credited as Jess Bowers)
- The Gunman from Bodie (1941) (credited as Jess Bowers)
- Forbidden Trails (1941) (credited as Jess Bowers)
- Below the Border (1942) (credited as Jess Bowers)
- Dawn on the Great Divide (1942) (credited as Jess Bowers)
- Down Texas Way (1942) (credited as Jess Bowers)
- Ghost Town Law (1942) (credited as Jess Bowers)
- Riders of the West (1942) (credited as Jess Bowers)
- West of the Law (1942) (credited as Jess Bowers)
- The Ghost Rider (1943) (credited as Jess Bowers)
- Outlaws of Stampede Pass (1943) (credited as Jess Bowers)
- Six Gun Gospel (1943) (credited as Jess Bowers)
- The Stranger from Pecos (1943) (credited as Jess Bowers)
- The Texas Kid (1943) (credited as Jess Bowers)
- Raiders of the Border (1944) (credited as Jess Bowers)
- Bad Men of the Border (1945)
- Flame of the West (1945)
- Frontier Feud (1945) (credited as Jess Bowers)
- The Lost Trail (1945) (credited as Jess Bowers)
- The Navajo Trail (1945) (credited as Jess Bowers)
- Stranger from Santa Fe (1945) (credited as Jess Bowers)
- Drifting Along (1946)
- Shadows on the Range (1946) (credited as Jess Bowers)
- Wild Beauty (1946)
- Overland Trails (1948) (credited as Jess Bowers)
- The Valiant Hombre (1949)
- Crashing Thru (1949)
- Haunted Trails (1949)
- Shadows of the West (1949)
- Streets of San Francisco (1949)
- West of El Dorado (1949)
- Range Land (1949)
- Riders of the Dusk (1949) (credited as Jess Bowers)
- Western Renegades (1949)
- Arizona Territory (1950)
- Gunslingers (1950)
- Jiggs and Maggie Out West (1950)
- Six Gun Mesa (1950)
- West of Wyoming (1950)
- Overland Telegraph (1951)
- Born to the Saddle (1952)
- Cow Country (1953)
- Bullwhip (1958)

== Later life ==
In the late 1950s, Buffington would also write a single episode for two different television series: Adventures of Wild Bill Hickok in 1955 and The Restless Gun in 1959. Buffington's final screenplay was for 1958's Bullwhip, which starred Guy Madison and Rhonda Fleming, after which she retired from the film industry. She spent her later years living at the Motion Picture Country House and Hospital, in Woodland Hills, California, where she died on November 23, 1973.
