= The Ape (1940 film) =

1940 film by William Nigh

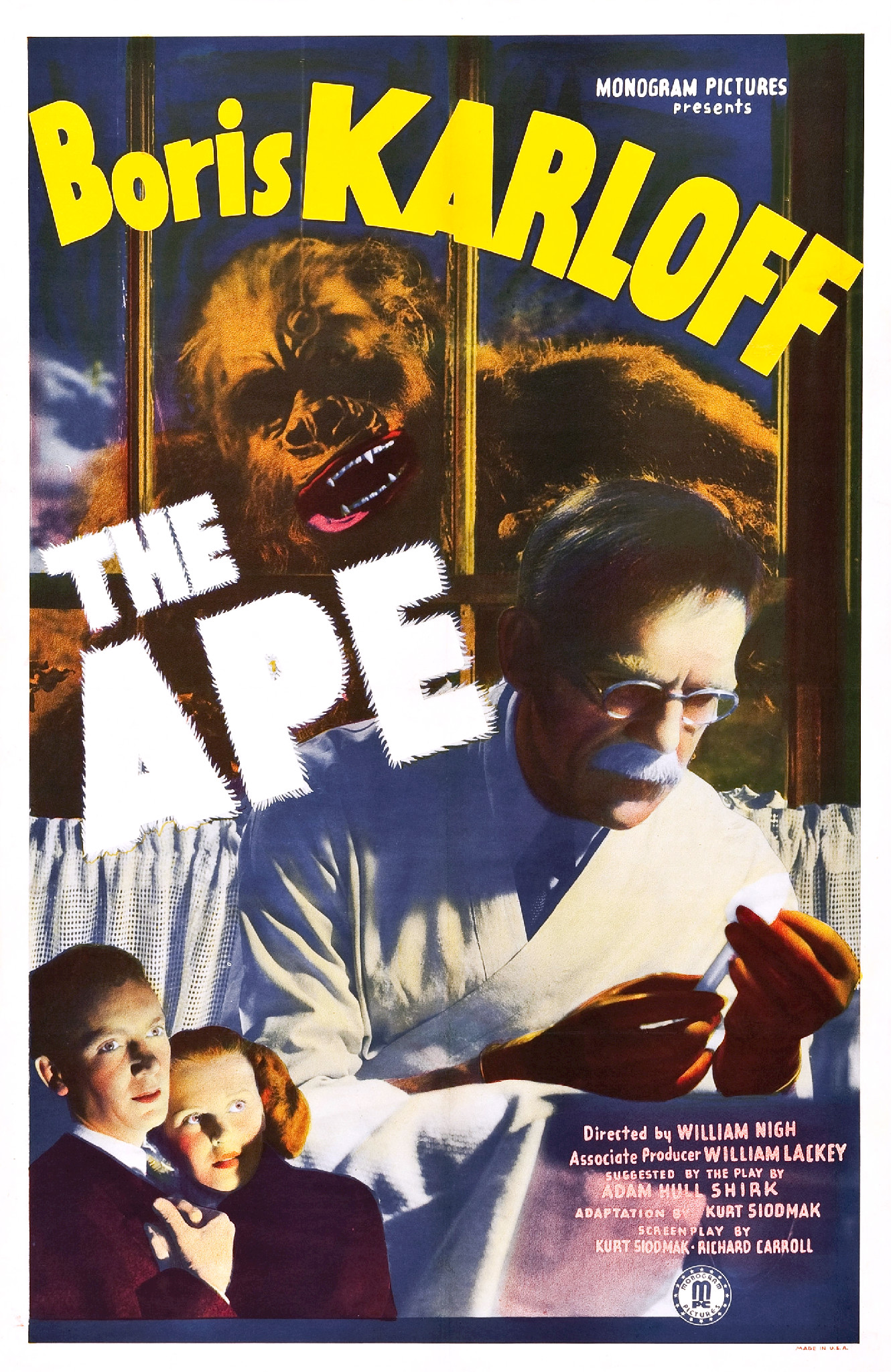
- Directed by: William Nigh
- Screenplay by: Richard Carroll; Curt Siodmak
- Based on: The Ape by Adam Hull Shirk
- Produced by: Scott R. Dunlap
- Starring: Boris Karloff
- Cinematography: Harry Neumann
- Edited by: Russell Schoengarth
- Music by: Edward J. Kay
- Production company: Monogram Pictures Corp.
- Distributed by: Monogram Pictures Corp.
- Release date: September 30, 1940
- Running time: 62 minutes
- Country: United States

The Ape is a 1940 American horror film directed by William Nigh. The film is based on Adam Hull Shirk's play The Ape, which was previously adapted by Nigh as The House of Mystery (1934). The film stars Boris Karloff as Dr. Bernard Adrian who is seeking to cure a young woman's polio through experiments involving spinal fluid. Meanwhile, a vicious ape has been terrorizing the towns locals, and ends up breaking into Adrian's lab. A battle ensues between the two, leading to the ape’s death, the destruction of Adrian’s spinal fluid samples, and Adrian deciding to skin the ape and disguise himself as the beast in order to kill people to get more spinal fluid.

The Ape was made by Monogram Pictures Corp. after making several Mr. Wong films with both Karloff and Nigh. According to actress Maris Wrixon, it was filmed within a week. The film received mixed reviews from critics on its release, with positive reviews from The Hollywood Reporter, Kinematograph Weekly, and the Los Angeles Times while receiving negative reviews from The New York Times and Variety. Retrospective reviews generally have commented on how ridiculous they had found the film or how a reviewer felt it did not work as a thrilling story.

== Plot ==
Dr. Bernard Adrian is a kindly scientist who was forced to become a small town physician after the medical community rejected his theories. He persists however in pursuing his experiments on nerve regeneration, with the quiet support of his mute elderly housekeeper Jane, and becomes determined to cure local girl Frances Clifford's polio induced paralysis so she can eventually marry her sweetheart Danny Foster. After much work the doctor determines that all he needs is spinal fluid from another human to complete the formula for his experimental serum. Meanwhile, a vicious circus ape named Nabu mortally wounds his handler before breaking out of his cage and terrorizing the townspeople. After some time on the lam, the ape eventually breaks into Dr. Adrian's lab. The Doctor manages to kill it before any harm can come to himself. However, all the vials of the spinal fluids he requires to perform his experiments are destroyed during the struggle between him and the Ape.

Doctor Adrian then concocts an idea after performing an autopsy on the circus handler: he will tear off the ape's flesh and use its skin to disguise himself as the escaped circus animal before murdering townspeople in order to extract their spinal fluid. Thus the murders will be blamed on the Ape and he, himself, will manage to avoid any suspicion. His conviction to follow through with his plan is further strengthened when he begins to see tangible results from the remnants of his experimental formula after administering it to Frances. During one of his attacks towards the film's ending though, Adrian is shot and mortally wounded causing him to collapse in front of his own doorstep. The concerned towns-folks believing the ape might have harmed the doctor rush to the scene and there the Ape's "true identity" is revealed to the town. Just before he passes through the dying doctor sees Frances walk for the first time and so dies with a smile on his face. The movie ends with Danny and a no longer paralyzed Frances enjoying life and happily looking forward to what the future may hold.

== Cast ==
Cast adapted from the book Poverty Row Horrors!.

- Boris Karloff as Dr. Bernard Adrian
- Maris Wrixon as Frances Clifford
- Gene O'Donnell as Danny Foster
- Dorothy Vaughan as Mrs. Clifford
- Gertrude W. Hoffmann as Jane
- Henry Hall as Sheriff Jeff Halliday
- Selmer Jackson as Dr. McNulty
- Mary Field as Mrs. Mason
- I. Stanford Jolley as the Ape Trainer
- Ray "Crash" Corrigan as Nabu, the Ape

== Production ==
Boris Karloff had previously worked at Monogram Pictures playing the role of the detective James Lee Wong, based on Hugh Wiley's stories published in Collier's magazine. Karloff appeared in five films as the character within two years. After the success of the horror film Son of Frankenstein (1939), Keye Luke took over for Karloff as the detective in Phantom of Chinatown (1940) while Karloff was cast in the horror film The Ape. The film's director was William Nigh who had worked with Karloff on the five Mr. Wong films. On July 9, 1940, Curt Siodmak was hired. The Ape was based on the play of the same title by Adam Hull Shirk. Along with screenwriter Richard Carroll, the two wrote a story for him similar to the mad doctor films Karloff had made with Columbia Pictures. The two films only follow the plot point of a character disguising themselves as an ape. Siodmak spoke of the adaptation, declaring that "whether it was The Ape, The Climax (1944), or I Walked with a Zombie (1943), I never used the original material. I used my own stories."

Among the cast was Maris Wrixon who was on loan to Monogram from Warner Bros. Pictures. Wrixon recalled that she received the script for the film one or two days before shooting. She declared that she enjoyed working with Karloff and Nigh, but that working for Monogram was like "living in a poor apartment. It was like living in a foxhole." Gene O'Donnell also spoke positively about working with Karloff and Nigh, while echoing that working at Monogram and other poverty row studios were "very frugal and awful careful about what they did."

Production on The Ape started on August 6, 1940. It was filmed in the city of Newhall, Santa Clarita, California. While the film was promoted as being a larger budget production for Monogram, film historian Tom Weaver stated that the circus footage in the film appeared to be taken from another film and some shorts of Karloff's character leaving and entering his house are repeated. According to Wrixon, the film finished filming within a week.

== Release ==
The Ape was released on September 30, 1940, and was distributed by Monogram Pictures. The film has received numerous home video releases from various publications including Roan Group, Alpha Video, Millcreek Entertainment, and EchoBridge.

== Reception ==
From contemporary reviews, The New York Times gave a dismissive review, declaring that "perhaps if you are under 12 or just like to be frightened and try very hard, 'The Ape,' now at the Rialto, will scare daylights out of you" and that Karloff "is properly baleful" while the rest of the cast displayed "dark looks about in the best 1912 style of acting." A reviewer in Variety also gave the film a negative review, declaring that "ultimate weight of the flick as a suspenser is nil, and most of the footage is extremely boring."

Kate Cameron of New York Daily News stated that the film's plot "doesn't bear scrutiny at close range, but it does get over some good horror effects." Irene Therer of the New York Observer gave the film a "FAIR" ranking, stating it was "not awfully exciting" at that Nigh directed the film "rather tamely." The Los Angeles Times reviewer "K.G." praising Boris Karloff's performance stating that "No matter how far-fetched the story, he always makes it believable." K.G. concluded that "a few loose ends mar the film", noting an unnecessary fire sequence and the lack of explanation of what happened to the villain. A reviewer for The Hollywood Reporter found the film to be a better production from Monogram, noting "well-made, interesting and notable for excellent performances", specifically highlighting Karloff. In the United Kingdom, Kinematograph Weekly also praised the film as "first class thriller fiction" and that Karloff "acts with conviction and sincerity."

From retrospective reviews, Phil Hardy's The Encyclopedia of Horror Movies found the film to be "agreeably dotty" but "distressingly tacky." Michael Weldon's The Psychotronic Encyclopedia of Film declared the film to be "probably the silliest movie in Karloff's entire career...and you thought only Bela Lugosi made films this dumb." A review in The Motion Picture Guide specifically found that the film "never finds the right groove, veering between odd thriller and ridiculous mad scientist tale." Vic Pratt wrote for the British Film Institute, and found that The Ape "may be the most ludicrous [of Karloff's career], but it’s no less wonderful for that."

== See also ==
- Boris Karloff filmography
- List of American films of 1940
- List of horror films of the 1940s
- List of Monogram Pictures and Allied Artists Pictures films
- List of films in the public domain in the United States
