= George DeNormand =

American actor (1903–1976)

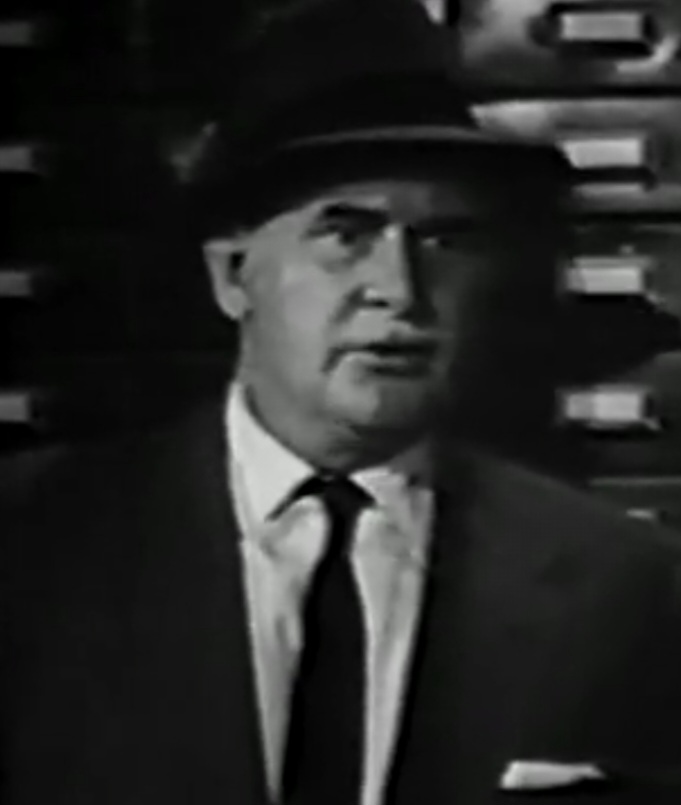
- DeNormand in an episode of Lock-Up (1960)
- Born: September 22, 1903
- Died: December 23, 1976 (aged 73)
- Resting place: Forest Lawn Memorial Park, Hollywood Hills
- Occupation: Actor
- Years active: 1931–1977
- Spouse: Wanda Tuchoch

George DeNormand (September 22, 1903 – December 23, 1976) was an American actor and stuntman.

== Biography ==
DeNormand was an amateur middleweight boxer in the 1920s.

He was a prolific though often uncredited actor and stunt double in movies such as The Raven and Bride of Frankenstein. He was a stunt double in The Lone Ranger serials in the 1930s.

He made headlines in 1944 when he stole a bracelet valued at $20,000 as a prank and in 1945 due to his connection with a black market meat ration ring.

In a 1969 episode of My Three Sons ("Came the Day"), he was to play the uncle of the bride (Beverly Garland), but he faltered so many times while walking her down the aisle that DeCordova, the director, recast Tony Regan in the role.

Later in his career, he participated in a discussion panel on movie serial at the Fantasy Film convention in 1973 and was also interviewed by Jim Harmon.

He was married to and divorced from Wanda Tuchoch (1898 – 1985).

He died in 1976 and was buried in Hollywood Hills at Forest Lawn Cemetery.

== Selected filmography ==
- Trapped (1931) – Sally's Chauffeur (uncredited)
- The Lost Special (1932, Serial) – Henchman (uncredited)
- Pirate Treasure (1934) – Henchman Jed
- Tailspin Tommy (1934, Serial) – George – Denver Official, Ch. 6 (uncredited)
- Diamond Jim (1935) – Passenger (uncredited)
- Tailspin Tommy in the Great Air Mystery (1935) – Crewman Smith [Chs. 11-12] (uncredited)
- The Ghost Rider (1943) – Red – Henchman
- The Ghost Ship (1943)
- Clancy Street Boys (1943) – Williams
- Captain America (1944, Serial) – Pete (uncredited)
- Law of the Valley (1944) – Red Adams – Henchman
- Colorado Serenade (1946) – Lefty – Dillon Henchman (uncredited)
- The Vigilante (1947, Serial) – Rocky / Jackson / Driver (uncredited)
- Return of the Lash (1947) – Jeff Harper
- Brick Bradford (1947, Serial) – Meaker (uncredited)
- Tex Granger (1948, Serial) – Stage Guard (uncredited)
- Superman (1948, Serial) – Agent with Crandall (uncredited)
- Bruce Gentry – Daredevil of the Skies (1949) – Henchman (uncredited)
- The Daring Caballero (1949) – Henchman (uncredited)
- Satan's Cradle (1949) – Henchman Idaho
- Outlaws of Texas (1950) – Henchman Bilson
- Wanted: Dead or Alive (1951) – Bart Richards
- To Catch a Thief (1955) – Detective (uncredited)
- Meet Me in Las Vegas (1956) – Show Spectator (uncredited)
- The Wild Dakotas (1956) – Trooper (uncredited)
- Alfred Hitchcock Presents (1957) (Season 2 Episode 21: "Number Twenty-Two") – Reporter (uncredited)
- The Kettles on Old MacDonald's Farm (1957) – Hunter (uncredited)
- The World Was His Jury (1958) – Ship Passenger (uncredited)
- Al Capone (1959) – Capone Associate (uncredited)
- The Tingler (1959) – Member of Silent Movie Audience (uncredited)
- Cimarron (1960) – Townsman at Celebration (uncredited)
- The Manchurian Candidate (1962) – Delegate (uncredited)
- The Alfred Hitchcock Hour (1962) (Season 1 Episode 12: "Hangover") – Audience Member (uncredited)
- The Underwater City (1962) – Dr. Carl Wendt (uncredited)
- X: The Man with the X-Ray Eyes (1963) – Medical Board Member (uncredited)
- 4 for Texas (1963) – Yellow Jacket (uncredited)
- The Nutty Professor (1963) – Faculty Member (uncredited)
- Mary Poppins (1964) – Townsman (uncredited)
- The Alfred Hitchcock Hour (1964) (Season 2 Episode 20: "Anyone for Murder?") – Man at Exchange (uncredited)
- The Alfred Hitchcock Hour (1964) (Season 2 Episode 21: "Beast in View") – Man on Street (uncredited)
- The Alfred Hitchcock Hour (1964) (Season 2 Episode 27: "The Sign of Satan") – Police Inspector (uncredited)
- The Outlaws Is Coming (1965) – Townsman (uncredited)
- Harlow (1965) – Party Guest (uncredited)
- Batman (1966) – Policeman (uncredited)
- How to Succeed in Business Without Really Trying (1967) – TV Board Member (uncredited)
- Good Times (1967) – Club Patron (uncredited)
- The Graduate (1967) – Hotel Guest (uncredited)
- Hang 'Em High (1968) – Townsman (uncredited)
- Rogue's Gallery (1968) – Observe Outside Office (uncredited)
- Tora! Tora! Tora! (1970) – Official (uncredited)
- The Wacky Zoo of Morgan City (1970) – Party Guest
