= Christine McIntyre =

American actress and singer (1911–1984)

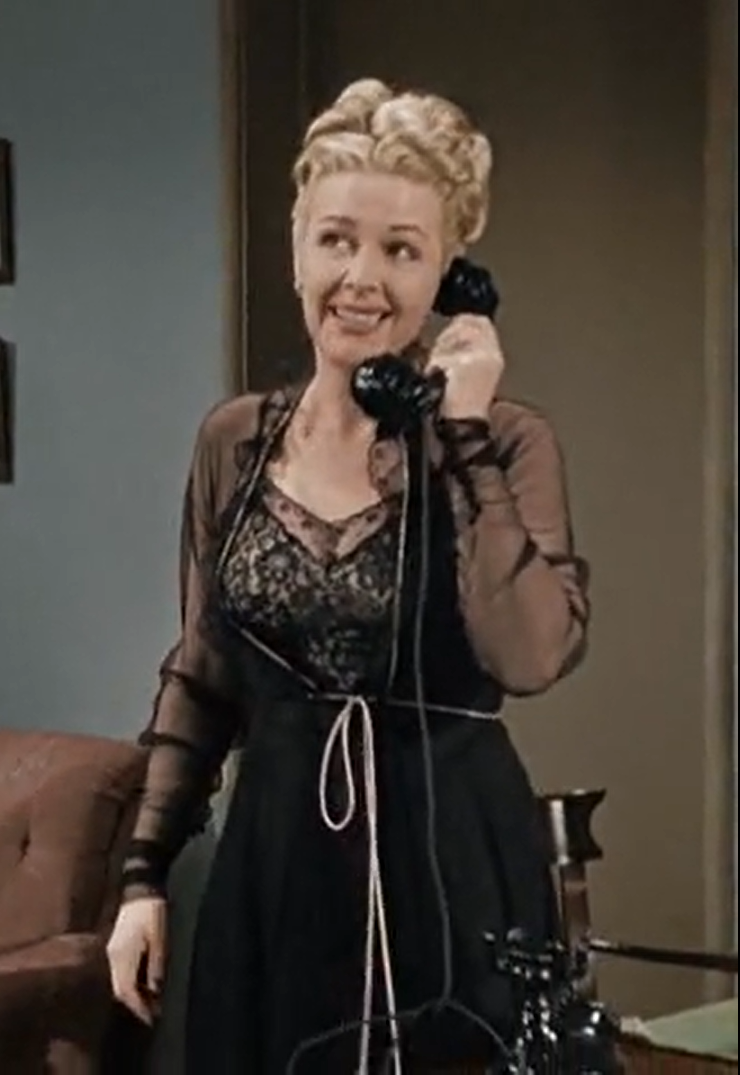
- McIntyre in the short film Brideless Groom (1947)
- Born: Christine Cecilia McIntyre; April 16, 1911; Nogales, Arizona, U.S.
- Died: July 8, 1984 (aged 73); Van Nuys, California, U.S.
- Resting place: Holy Cross Cemetery, Culver City
- Education: Chicago Musical College (Bachelor of Music, 1933)
- Occupations: Actress, singer
- Years active: 1937–1955
- Spouse: J. Donald Wilson (m. 1953; died 1984)

Christine Cecilia McIntyre (April 16, 1911 – July 8, 1984) was an American actress and singer who appeared in various films from 1937 to 1954. She is mainly remembered as the beautiful blonde in many of The Three Stooges shorts produced by Columbia Pictures.

== Early career ==
A native of Nogales, Arizona, McIntyre was one of five children. A classically trained singer, McIntyre received a Bachelor of Music degree at Chicago Musical College in 1933. It was here that she developed her operatic soprano voice, which would be put to good use in several Three Stooges films in the 1940s.

McIntyre began singing in feature films at RKO Radio Pictures, and made her film debut in the 1937 short subject Swing Fever. She then appeared in a series of low-budget westerns, often starring Buck Jones. She appeared with dark hair in these early roles, and also appeared occasionally in "mainstream" feature films (like 1939's Blondie Takes a Vacation). She sang "The Blue Danube" and "Voices of Spring" in a Vienna-themed musical short filmed for the Soundies film jukeboxes, and her performance was singled out as the best of the inaugural series.

== The Three Stooges and Columbia Pictures ==
In 1944, Columbia Pictures producer Hugh McCollum signed McIntyre to a decade-long contract. At Columbia, she appeared in scores of short subjects with almost all of the Columbia short-subject comedy stars: The Three Stooges, Shemp Howard, Harry Langdon, Andy Clyde, Hugh Herbert, Vera Vague, Billy Gilbert, Harry Von Zell, Joe Besser, Joe DeRita, Bert Wheeler, Slim Summerville, Sterling Holloway, Gus Schilling & Richard Lane, Wally Vernon & Eddie Quillan, Wally Brown & Tim Ryan, and Max Baer & Maxie Rosenbloom. The Hugh Herbert comedy Wife Decoy is actually a showcase for Christine McIntyre, who is the principal character. In this film, she appears as a brunette who dyes her hair blonde. From then on in her screen appearances, she remained a blonde. In her Columbia comedies she played charming heroines, scheming villains, and flighty socialites.

Her debut appearance with the Three Stooges was in Idle Roomers, followed by a solo Shemp Howard short, Open Season for Saps. She auditioned her singing voice for Hugh McCollum's director Edward Bernds, offering "Voices of Spring". Bernds cast her in Micro-Phonies, where she reprised the song. Bernds had her sing "The Last Rose of Summer" in 1947’s Out West and a pastiche of the "Lucia Sextet" in 1948’s Squareheads of the Round Table.

McCollum and Bernds recognized McIntyre's abilities and often tailored material especially for her, allowing her to improvise as she saw fit. Her performance as Miss Hopkins in Brideless Groom (1947) featured a memorable knockabout scene in which she repels suitor Shemp Howard—right through a door. Director Bernds remembered:

In the story, Shemp had a few hours in which to get married if he wanted to inherit his uncle's fortune. He called on Christine McIntyre, who mistook him for her cousin (Basil) and greeted him with hugs and kisses. Then the real cousin phoned and she accused Shemp of kissing her, as it were, under false pretenses. At this point, she was supposed to slap Shemp around. Lady that she was, Chris couldn't do it right; she dabbed at him daintily, afraid of hurting him. After a couple of bad takes, Shemp pleaded with her. 'Honey,' he said, 'if you want to do me a favor, cut loose and do it right. A lot of half-hearted slaps hurts more than one good one. Give it to me, Chris, and let's get it over with.' Chris got up her courage and on the next take, let Shemp have it. 'It' wound up as a whole series of slaps—the timing was beautiful; they rang out like pistol shots. Shemp was knocked into a chair, bounced up, met another ringing slap, fell down again, scrambled up, trying to explain, only to get another stinging slap. Then Chris delivered a haymaker—a right that knocked Shemp through the door. When the take was over, Shemp was groggy, really groggy. Chris put her arms around him and apologized tearfully. 'It's all right, honey,' Shemp said painfully. 'I said you should cut loose and you did. You sure as hell did!'

McIntyre also won a feature-film contract with Monogram Pictures. After playing a newspaper publisher in News Hounds, a comedy with The Bowery Boys, she usually played opposite Monogram's cowboy stars in low-budget Westerns.

McIntyre married radio personality John Donald Wilson in 1953. By this time, McCollum and Bernds had left Columbia, leaving Jules White in charge of short subjects. White favored strenuous, extremely physical humor, and forced the ladylike McIntyre to submit to low comedy; in a single film (Doggie in the Bedroom, 1954) she was tackled, hit with messy projectiles, covered with cake batter, and knocked into a cross-eyed stupor. When her contract with Columbia expired in 1954, she was all too happy to retire from show business, eventually developing a career in real estate. Columbia continued to use old footage of McIntyre through 1957, which is why she received billing in films made after her retirement.

== Filmography ==
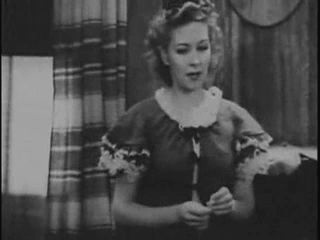
McIntyre in a still taken from the film Rock River Renegades.

=== Columbia two-reel comedies ===
- Garden of Eatin' (1943, Slim Summerville) – Mrs. Parker
- Who's Hugh? (1943, Hugh Herbert) – Mrs. Herbert
- To Heir Is Human (1944, Harry Langdon) – Velma
- Doctor, Feel My Pulse (1944, Vera Vague) – Sandra Stevens
- His Tale Is Told (1944, Andy Clyde) – Mrs. A.S. Steele
- Defective Detectives (1944, Harry Langdon, El Brendel) – Mrs. Rodney Boodle
- Crazy Like a Fox (1945, Billy Gilbert) – Potentate's daughter
- Mopey Dope (1945, Harry Langdon) – Neighbor
- His Hotel Sweet (1945, Hugh Herbert) – Mrs. Jack Norton
- Idle Roomers (1944, Stooges) – Mrs. Leander
- Wedded Bliss (1944, Billy Gilbert) – Wife
- Open Season for Saps (1944, Shemp Howard) – Irene
- A Knight and a Blonde (1944, Hugh Herbert) – The bride
- No Dough Boys (1944, Stooges) – Celia Zweiback
- Woo, Woo! (1945, Hugh Herbert) – Mrs. Herbert
- Three Pests in a Mess (1945, Stooges) – Cheatham's secretary
- Off Again, On Again (1945, Shemp Howard) – Edith
- Pistol Packin' Nitwits (1945, Harry Langdon, El Brendel) – Queenie Lynch
- Wife Decoy (1945, Hugh Herbert) – Blanche Hawkins
- The Mayor's Husband (1945, Hugh Herbert) – Hired girl
- Where the Pest Begins (1945, Shemp Howard) – Annie Batts
- Micro-Phonies (1945, Stooges) – Alice Andrews, alias Alice Van Doren
- The Blonde Stayed On (1946, Andy Clyde) – Maisie
- When the Wife's Away (1946, Hugh Herbert) – Mrs. Herbert
- Jiggers, My Wife! (1946, Shemp Howard) – Trixie
- The Three Troubledoers (1946, Stooges) – Nell the Blacksmith
- Get Along, Little Zombie (1946, Hugh Herbert) – Millie Mulligan
- Hot Water (1946, Gus Schilling & Richard Lane) – Dolly Malloy
- Pardon My Terror (1946, Gus Schilling & Richard Lane) – Alice Morton
- Society Mugs (1946, Shemp Howard, Tom Kennedy) – Muriel Allen
- Mr. Wright Goes Wrong (1946, Sterling Holloway)
- Honeymoon Blues (1946, Hugh Herbert) – Betty Lou
- Slappily Married (1946, Joe DeRita) – Mrs. Bates
- Three Little Pirates (1946, Stooges) – Rita Yolanda
- Meet Mr. Mischief (1946, Harry Von Zell) – Mrs. Von Zell
- Hot Heir (1947, Hugh Herbert) – Neighbor's Wife
- Bride and Gloom (1947, Shemp Howard) – Maisie Keeler
- Two Jills and a Jack (1947, Andy Clyde) – Betty
- Out West (1947, Stooges) – Nell
- Brideless Groom (1947, Stooges) – Miss Lulu Hopkins
- Wedding Belle (1947, Gus Schilling & Richard Lane) – Gladys Lane
- Rolling Down to Reno (1947, Harry Von Zell) – Mary Christman
- Hectic Honeymoon (1947, Sterling Holloway) – Ellen Duffy
- Should Husbands Marry? (1947, Hugh Herbert) – Mrs. Herbert
- Wife to Spare (1947, Andy Clyde) – Honey Jackson
- Wedlock Deadlock (1947, Joe DeRita) – Betty
- All Gummed Up (1947, Stooges) – Mrs. Serena Flint
- Shivering Sherlocks (1948, Stooges) – Gladys Harmon
- Squareheads of the Round Table (1948, Stooges) – Princess Elaine
- Tall, Dark and Gruesome (1948, Hugh Herbert) – Party guest
- Two Nuts in a Rut (1948, Gus Schilling & Richard Lane) – Mrs. Higgins
- Jitter Bughouse (1948, Joe DeRita) – Myrtle
- The Sheepish Wolf (1948, Hugh Herbert) – Susan Pringle
- The Hot Scots (1948, Stooges) – Lorna Doone
- A Pinch in Time (1948, Hugh Herbert) – Blonde
- Crime on Their Hands (1948, Stooges) – Bea
- Parlor, Bedroom and Wrath (1948, Wally Vernon & Eddie Quillan) – Mrs. Vernon
- He's In Again (1949, Gus Schilling & Richard Lane) – Boss's daughter
- Who Done It? (1949, Stooges) – Goodrich's niece
- Trapped by a Blonde (1949, Hugh Herbert) – Sheriff's wife
- Flung by a Fling (1949, Gus Schilling & Richard Lane) – Mrs. Schilling
- Microspook (1949, Harry Von Zell) – Jean
- Fuelin' Around (1949, Stooges) – Hazel Sneed
- Clunked in the Clink (1949, Vera Vague) – Blonde
- Waiting in the Lurch (1949, Joe Besser) – Mae Knott
- Vagabond Loafers (1949, Stooges) – Mrs. Ethel Allen
- Super-Wolf (1949, Hugh Herbert) – Gladys Evans
- French Fried Frolic (1949, Wally Brown & Tim Ryan) – Paulette
- Punchy Cowpunchers (1950, Stooges) – Nell
- His Baiting Beauty (1950, Harry Von Zell) – Mrs. Von Zell
- Hugs and Mugs (1950, Stooges) – Lily
- Dopey Dicks (1950, Stooges) – Louise
- Love at First Bite (1950, Stooges) – Katrina
- Innocently Guilty (1950, Bert Wheeler) – Helen
- Three Hams on Rye (1950, Stooges) – Janeybelle
- A Blunderful Time (1950, Andy Clyde) – Betty Lou
- Studio Stoops (1950, Stooges) – Dolly Devore
- Wine, Women and Bong (1951, Max Baer & Maxie Rosenbloom) – Blonde
- She Took a Powder (1951, Vera Vague) – Sandra
- The Gink at the Sink (1952, Hugh Herbert) – Pearl
- Bubble Trouble (1953, Stooges) - Serena
- Oh, Say Can You Sue (1953, Andy Clyde) – Betty Wilson
- Doggie in the Bedroom (1954, Wally Vernon & Eddie Quillan) – Mrs. Vernon
- Pals and Gals (1954, Stooges) – Nell
- Knutzy Knights (1954, Stooges) – Princess Elaine
- The Fire Chaser (1954, Joe Besser) – Mae Knott
- Scotched in Scotland (1954, Stooges) – Lorna Doone
- Of Cash and Hash (1955, Stooges) – Gladys Harmon (final film role)

After Christine McIntyre left Columbia's employ, old film footage with McIntyre was edited into the following comedies:

- Hot Ice (1955, Stooges) – Bea (archive footage)
- Husbands Beware (1956, Stooges) – Lulu Hopkins (archive footage)
- For Crimin' Out Loud (1956, Stooges) – Goodrich's Niece (archive footage)
- Hot Stuff (1956, Stooges) – Hazel Sneed (archive footage)
- Scheming Schemers (1956, Stooges) – Mrs. Allen (archive footage)
- Fifi Blows Her Top (1958, Stooges) – Katrina (archive footage)
- Stop! Look! and Laugh! (1960, feature-length compilation of Stooge shorts) – Alice Andrews (Van Doren) (uncredited) (archive footage)

=== Other films ===
- Sea Racketeers (1937) – Mrs. Wilbur Crane
- The Rangers' Round-Up (1938) – Mary
- Missing Daughters (1939) – Ruth (uncredited)
- Blondie Takes a Vacation (1939) – Resort Singer (of 'Love in Bloom') (uncredited)
- The Gunman from Bodie (1941) – Alice Borden
- Forbidden Trails (1941) – Mary Doran
- Man from Headquarters (1942) – Telegraph Girl
- The Power of God (1942) – Charlotte Hale
- Rock River Renegades (1942) – Grace Ross
- Riders of the West (1942) – Hope Turner
- Dawn on the Great Divide (1942) – Mary Harkins
- Cinderella Swings It (1943) – Secretary
- Border Buckaroos (1943) – Betty Clark
- The Stranger from Pecos (1943) – Ruth Martin
- Beautiful But Broke (1944) – Telephone Operator (uncredited)
- Partners of the Trail (1944) – Kate Hilton
- Louisiana Hayride (1944) – Christine – Female Star (uncredited)
- West of the Rio Grande (1944) – Alice Darcy
- Kansas City Kitty (1944) – Hat Check Girl (uncredited)
- Men in Her Diary (1945) – Ms. Simmons (uncredited)
- The Crimson Canary (1945) – Anita's Roommate (uncredited)
- Frontier Feud (1945) – Blanche Corey
- Behind the Mask (1946) – Minor Role (uncredited)
- The Gentleman from Texas (1946) – Flo Vickert
- Valley of Fear (1947) – Joan Travers
- Land of the Lawless (1947) – Kansas City Kate
- The Secret Life of Walter Mitty (1947) – Miss Blair – Lingerie Dept. Manager (uncredited)
- News Hounds (1947) – Jane P. Connelly
- Gun Talk (1947) – Daisy Cameron
- A Modern Marriage (1950) – Nurse
- Corky of Gasoline Alley (1951) – Myrtle
- Colorado Ambush (1951) – Mae Star
- Dead or Alive (1951) – Spangles Calhoun
