= Land of the Lawless =

1947 film

- Theatrical release poster
- Directed by: Lambert Hillyer
- Screenplay by: J. Benton Cheney
- Produced by: Barney Sarecky
- Starring: Johnny Mack Brown; Raymond Hatton; Christine McIntyre; Tris Coffin; June Harrison; Marshall Reed
- Cinematography: William A. Sickner
- Edited by: Robert O. Crandall
- Production company: Monogram Pictures
- Distributed by: Monogram Pictures
- Release date: April 26, 1947
- Running time: 54 minutes
- Country: United States
- Language: English

Land of the Lawless is a 1947 American Western film directed by Lambert Hillyer and written by J. Benton Cheney. The film stars Johnny Mack Brown, Raymond Hatton, Christine McIntyre, Tris Coffin, June Harrison, and Marshall Reed. The film was released on April 26, 1947, by Monogram Pictures.

== Cast ==
- Johnny Mack Brown as Johnny Mack
- Raymond Hatton as Bodie
- Christine McIntyre as Kansas City Kate
- Tris Coffin as Cameo Carson
- June Harrison as Donna
- Marshall Reed as Yuma
- I. Stanford Jolley as Cherokee Kid
- Steve Clark as Jason
- Edmund Cobb as Hank
- Roy Butler as Doc Cassidy
- Cactus Mack as Dave
- Gary Garrett as Clem
