= Hard Boiled Mahoney =

1947 film by William Beaudine

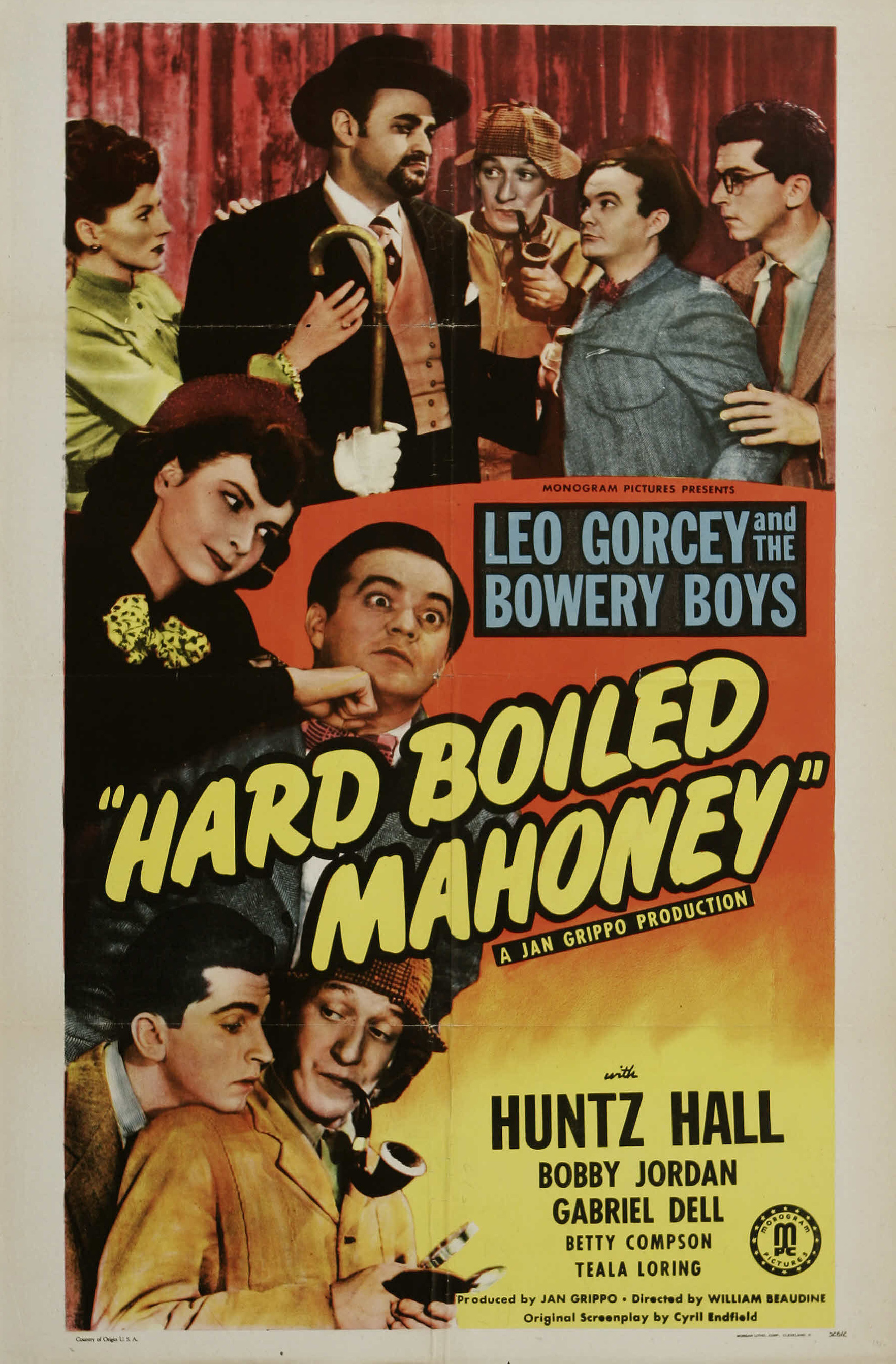
- Theatrical release poster
- Directed by: William Beaudine
- Written by: Cy Endfield
- Produced by: Jan Grippo
- Starring: Leo Gorcey; Huntz Hall; Bobby Jordan; William Benedict; Gabriel Dell
- Cinematography: James S. Brown Jr.
- Edited by: William Austin
- Music by: Edward J. Kay
- Distributed by: Monogram Pictures
- Release date: April 26, 1947
- Running time: 63 minutes
- Country: United States
- Language: English

Hard Boiled Mahoney is a 1947 American comedy film directed by William Beaudine and starring the comedy team of the Bowery Boys along with Teala Loring and Betty Compson. It is the sixth film in the series produced by Monogram Pictures.

== Plot ==
Sach has lost his job as an assistant to a private detective, but he was not paid. Slip accompanies Sach to the detective's office to demand payment but finds the office empty. A woman enters the office and mistakes Slip for the detective. She convinces him to find her sister after offering a $50 retainer.

The only help that Sach and Slip have is the spiritualist Dr. Carter. They witness his murder, and Slip is knocked unconscious. When he wakes, a woman is there calling the police. Slip identifies her as the other woman's sister, but she denies it. After asking questions, Slip believes the woman is not the other one's sister and they assist each other in escaping the police and make plans to meet later.

Slip and Sach visit the fortune teller Armand and learn that the two women are not related; instead, the women both want to take possession of incriminating letters that Armand uses to blackmail them. There is a fight at a sweet shop and the police arrest Armand and his gang.

== Cast ==
=== The Bowery Boys ===
- Leo Gorcey as Terrance 'Slip' Mahoney
- Huntz Hall as Sach
- Bobby Jordan as Bobby
- Gabriel Dell as Gabe
- Billy Benedict as Whitey
- David Gorcey as Chuck

=== Remaining cast ===
- Betty Compson as Salina Webster
- Teala Loring as Eleanor
- Dan Seymour as Dr. Armand
- Byron Foulger as Prof. Quizard
- Patti Brill as Alice
- Pierre Watkin as Dr. Rolfe Carter
- Danny Beck as Lennie the Meatball
- Bernard Gorcey as Louie Dumbrowski
- Carmen D'Antonio as Receptionist
- Noble Johnson as Hasson
- William Ruhl as McGregor

== Production ==
This is the only Bowery Boys film in which Gabe (Gabriel Dell) is part of the team. In every other film. he is a protagonist or former team member. In this film, he reprises his character of Talman (a.k.a. Pete) that he portrayed in the East Side Kids' final film, Come Out Fighting.

== Home media ==
The film was released in VHS format by Warner Bros. on September 1, 1998.

Warner Archives released the film on made-to-order DVD in the United States as part of the second volume of a Bowery Boys set on April 9, 2013.

Preceded by Mr. Hex; 1947	'The Bowery Boys' movies 1946-1958	Succeeded by News Hounds; 1947
