= Riders of the Dusk =

1949 film

- Theatrical release poster
- Directed by: Lambert Hillyer
- Screenplay by: Adele Buffington; Robert Emmett Tansey
- Produced by: Eddie Davis
- Starring: Whip Wilson; Andy Clyde; Reno Browne; Tris Coffin; Marshall Reed; Myron Healey
- Cinematography: Harry Neumann
- Edited by: John C. Fuller
- Production company: Monogram Pictures
- Distributed by: Monogram Pictures
- Release date: November 13, 1949
- Running time: 57 minutes
- Country: United States
- Language: English

Riders of the Dusk is a 1949 American Western film directed by Lambert Hillyer and written by Adele Buffington and Robert Emmett Tansey. The film stars Whip Wilson, Andy Clyde, Reno Browne, Tris Coffin, Marshall Reed and Myron Healey. The film was released on November 13, 1949, by Monogram Pictures.

== Cast ==
- Whip Wilson as Whip Wilson
- Andy Clyde as Winks Holliday
- Reno Browne as Nora Neal
- Tris Coffin as J.J. Hall
- Marshall Reed as Brad Bradshaw
- Myron Healey as Sheriff Jim Scott
- John Merton as Art
- Mike Ragan as Gus
- Lee Roberts as Danny
- Dee Cooper as Tom
- Thornton Edwards as Deputy Ed
