= The Gentleman from Texas =

1946 film directed by Lambert Hillyer

- Theatrical release poster
- Directed by: Lambert Hillyer
- Screenplay by: J. Benton Cheney
- Produced by: Scott R. Dunlap
- Starring: Johnny Mack Brown; Claudia Drake; Raymond Hatton; Reno Browne; Christine McIntyre; Tris Coffin
- Cinematography: Harry Neumann
- Edited by: Fred Maguire
- Production company: Monogram Pictures
- Distributed by: Monogram Pictures
- Release date: June 8, 1946
- Running time: 55 minutes
- Country: United States
- Language: English

The Gentleman from Texas is a 1946 American Western film directed by Lambert Hillyer and written by J. Benton Cheney. The film stars Johnny Mack Brown, Claudia Drake, Raymond Hatton, Reno Browne, Christine McIntyre and Tris Coffin. The film was released on June 8, 1946, by Monogram Pictures.

== Cast ==
- Johnny Mack Brown as Johnny Macklin
- Claudia Drake as Kitty Malone
- Raymond Hatton as Idaho Jim Foster
- Reno Browne as Diane Foster
- Christine McIntyre as Flo Vickert
- Tris Coffin as Steve Corbin
- Marshall Reed as Duke Carter
- Ted Adams as Williams
- Frank LaRue as Burton Trevor
- Steve Clark as Tom Jamison
- Terry Frost as Ace Jenkins
- Tom Carter as Burke
- Jack Rockwell as Pete
- Lynton Brent as Slats
- Pierce Lyden as Jess Stover
