= West of the Law =

American Western film

- Theatrical release poster
- Directed by: Howard Bretherton
- Screenplay by: Adele Buffington
- Produced by: Scott R. Dunlap
- Starring: Buck Jones; Tim McCoy; Raymond Hatton; Evelyn Cook; Harry Woods; Jack Daley
- Cinematography: Harry Neumann
- Edited by: Carl Pierson
- Production company: Monogram Pictures
- Distributed by: Monogram Pictures
- Release date: October 2, 1942
- Running time: 60 minutes
- Country: United States
- Language: English

West of the Law is a 1942 American Western film directed by Howard Bretherton and written by Adele Buffington. This is the eighth film in Monogram Pictures' Rough Riders series, and stars Buck Jones as Marshal Buck Roberts, Tim McCoy as Marshal Tim McCall and Raymond Hatton as Marshal Sandy Hopkins, with Evelyn Cook, Harry Woods and Jack Daley. The film was released on October 2, 1942, by Monogram Pictures.

== Cast ==
- Buck Jones as Buck Roberts / Rocky Saunders
- Tim McCoy as Tim McCall
- Raymond Hatton as Sandy Hopkins
- Evelyn Cook as Julie Todd
- Harry Woods as Jim Rand
- Jack Daley as John Corbett
- Malcolm 'Bud' McTaggart as Ray Mason
- Milburn Morante as Rufus Todd
- Roy Barcroft as Ludlow
