= News Hounds =

1947 film by William Beaudine

- Theatrical poster
- Directed by: William Beaudine
- Written by: Edmond Seward; Tim Ryan
- Produced by: Jan Grippo
- Starring: Leo Gorcey; Huntz Hall; Bobby Jordan; William Benedict; Gabriel Dell
- Cinematography: Marcel Le Picard
- Edited by: William Austin
- Music by: Edward J. Kay
- Distributed by: Monogram Pictures
- Release date: August 13, 1947
- Running time: 68 minutes
- Language: English

News Hounds is a 1947 American comedy film directed by William Beaudine and starring the comedy team of The Bowery Boys. It is the seventh film in the series produced by Monogram Pictures.

== Plot ==
Slip is a copy boy for a newspaper, but dreams of having his own byline. Sach is an aspiring photographer for the same paper. The two of them come across a plot to fix sporting events and go undercover to expose the gangsters. Gabe, who is working for the gangsters, has a story of Slip's published which brings a libel suit against the paper because of lack of evidence. The lawsuit goes to trial, and at the last minute Gabe, who is feeling remorse, retrieves photographs that would back the story and gets them to Slip in time for them to be presented as evidence.

== Cast ==
=== The Bowery Boys ===
- Leo Gorcey as Terrance J. Montgomery 'Slip' Mahoney
- Huntz Hall as Horace Debussy 'Sach' Jones
- Bobby Jordan as Bobby
- William Benedict as Whitey
- David Gorcey as Chuck

=== Remaining cast ===
- Gabriel Dell as Gabe
- Bernard Gorcey as Louie Dumbrowski
- Tim Ryan as John Burks
- Anthony Caruso as "Dapper Dan" Greco
- Christine McIntyre as Jane Ann Connelly
- Nita Bieber as Mame

== Home media ==
Warner Archives released the film on made-to-order DVD in the United States as part of "The Bowery Boys, Volume One" on November 23, 2012.

Preceded by Hard Boiled Mahoney; 1947	'The Bowery Boys' movies 1946-1958	Succeeded by Bowery Buckaroos; 1947
