= Valley of Fear (film) =

1947 American western film

- Theatrical release poster
- Directed by: Lambert Hillyer
- Screenplay by: J. Benton Cheney
- Produced by: Charles J. Bigelow
- Starring: Johnny Mack Brown; Raymond Hatton; Christine McIntyre; Tris Coffin; Ed Cassidy; Eddie Parker
- Cinematography: Harry Neumann
- Edited by: Roy Livingston
- Production company: Monogram Pictures
- Distributed by: Monogram Pictures
- Release date: February 15, 1947
- Running time: 54 minutes
- Country: United States
- Language: English

Valley of Fear is a 1947 American Western film directed by Lambert Hillyer and written by J. Benton Cheney. The film stars Johnny Mack Brown, Raymond Hatton, Christine McIntyre, Tris Coffin, Ed Cassidy and Eddie Parker. The film was released on February 15, 1947, by Monogram Pictures.

== Cast ==
- Johnny Mack Brown as Johnny Williams
- Raymond Hatton as Rusty Peters
- Christine McIntyre as Joan Travers
- Tris Coffin as Henry Stevens
- Ed Cassidy as Les Travers
- Eddie Parker as Duke
- Edward Peil Sr. as Jamison Forbes
- Ted Adams as Frank Wilkins
- Pierce Lyden as Sheriff Wheeler
- Steve Darrell as Tom Lansing
- Cactus Mack as Spence Mallory
- Budd Buster as Pete the Bootmaker
