= A Modern Marriage =

1950 film

- Theatrical release poster
- Directed by: Paul Landres
- Screenplay by: Samuel Roeca; George Wallace Sayre
- Produced by: David Diamond
- Starring: Reed Hadley; Margaret Field; Robert Clarke; Nana Bryant; Burt Wenland; Christine McIntyre
- Cinematography: William A. Sickner
- Edited by: Philip Cahn
- Music by: Edward J. Kay
- Production company: Monogram Pictures
- Distributed by: Monogram Pictures
- Release date: July 10, 1950
- Running time: 66 minutes
- Country: United States
- Language: English

A Modern Marriage is a 1950 American drama film directed by Paul Landres and written by Samuel Roeca and George Wallace Sayre. The film stars Reed Hadley, Margaret Field, Robert Clarke, Nana Bryant, Burt Wenland and Christine McIntyre. It was released on July 10, 1950 by Monogram Pictures.

== Cast ==
- Reed Hadley as Dr. Donald Andrews
- Margaret Field as Evelyn Brown
- Robert Clarke as Bill Burke
- Nana Bryant as Mrs. Brown
- Burt Wenland as Porter
- Christine McIntyre as Nurse
- Edward Keane as Dr. Connors
- Charles Smith as Jimmy Watson
- Buddy Gorman as Messenger Boy
- Dick Elliott as Jim Burke
- Lelah Tyler as Mrs. Burke
- Pattie Chapman as Mary Burke
- Buddy Swan as Spike
- Frank Fenton as Mr. Brown
- Sherry Jackson as Evelyn
- Dian Fauntelle as Secretary
- Peggy Wynne as Nurse
- Bret Hamilton as Delivery Man

== Reception ==
In a contemporary review, the Los Angeles Times wrote: "The many family relations organizations now established are qualified to provide deeply human stories for the screen. Such a one, without bathos or sickening sentimentality, but vital and intensely absorbing, is 'A Modern Marriage,' declared in a foreword to be authentic except for names and a few details. ... Margaret Field gives a wonderfully effective characterization in the difficult role of the girl."

== Legacy ==
The film was repackaged and rereleased in 1962 as Frigid Wife, with a 12-minute prologue that depicts a marriage counselor telling the story of A Modern Marriage as a case history for two patients.
