= Dawn on the Great Divide =

1942 film by Howard Bretherton

- Theatrical release poster
- Directed by: Howard Bretherton
- Written by: Adele Buffington (screenplay)
- Based on: Wheels of Fate by James Oliver Curwood
- Produced by: Scott R. Dunlap (associate producer)
- Starring: See below
- Cinematography: Harry Neumann
- Edited by: Carl Pierson
- Music by: Edward J. Kay
- Distributed by: Monogram Pictures
- Release date: 18 December 1942
- Running time: 63 minutes
- Country: United States
- Language: English

Dawn on the Great Divide is a 1942 American Western film directed by Howard Bretherton based on James Oliver Curwood's 1913 short story "Wheels of Fate". It was the final film of Buck Jones and the final film of Monogram Pictures Rough Riders film series. Colonel Tim McCoy was recalled up for military service in World War II and is not present in the film.

== Plot ==
The Rough Riders protect a wagon train and supplies for the railroad against a power hungry businessman who dresses his army of henchmen as Indians.

== Cast ==
- Buck Jones as Buck Roberts
- Mona Barrie as Sadie Rand
- Raymond Hatton as Sandy Hopkins
- Robert Lowery as Terry Wallace
- Rex Bell as Jack Carson
- Maude Eburne as Sarah Harkins
- Christine McIntyre as Mary Harkins, Sarah's Daughter
- Betty Blythe as Mrs. Elmira Corkle
- Robert Frazer as Judge John Corkle
- Harry Woods as Jim Corkle the Judge's Brother
- Tristram Coffin as Matt Rand
- Lee Shumway as Joe Wallace, Rail Road Official
- Roy Barcroft as Chuck Loder
- Steve Clark as Alex Kirby, Carson's Messinger
- Warren Jackson as Fred Cooke, Bartender
- Silver as Buck's horse

== Soundtrack ==
- Mona Barrie - Rock of Ages
- Christine McIntyre and Robert Lowery - Beautiful Dreamer
