= Riders of the West =

1942 film by Howard Bretherton

- Theatrical release poster
- Directed by: Howard Bretherton
- Screenplay by: Adele Buffington
- Produced by: Scott R. Dunlap
- Starring: Buck Jones; Tim McCoy; Raymond Hatton; Sarah Padden; Harry Woods; Christine McIntyre
- Cinematography: Harry Neumann
- Edited by: Carl Pierson
- Production company: Monogram Pictures
- Distributed by: Monogram Pictures
- Release date: August 21, 1942
- Running time: 58 minutes
- Country: United States
- Language: English

Riders of the West is a 1942 American Western film directed by Howard Bretherton and written by Adele Buffington. This is the seventh film in Monogram Pictures' Rough Riders series, and stars Buck Jones as Marshal Buck Roberts, Tim McCoy as Marshal Tim McCall and Raymond Hatton as Marshal Sandy Hopkins, with Sarah Padden, Harry Woods and Christine McIntyre. The film was released on August 21, 1942.

== Cast ==
- Buck Jones as Buck Roberts
- Tim McCoy as Tim McCall
- Raymond Hatton as Sandy Hopkins
- Sarah Padden as Ma Turner
- Harry Woods as Duke Mason
- Christine McIntyre as Hope Turner
- Charles King as Hogan
- Milburn Morante as Joe
- Walter McGrail as Miller
- Dennis Moore as Steve Holt
