= Gun Talk (film) =

1947 film by Lambert Hillyer

- Theatrical release poster
- Directed by: Lambert Hillyer
- Screenplay by: J. Benton Cheney
- Produced by: Barney Sarecky
- Starring: Johnny Mack Brown; Raymond Hatton; Christine McIntyre; Douglas Evans; Geneva Gray; Wheaton Chambers
- Cinematography: Harry Neumann
- Edited by: Fred Maguire
- Production company: Monogram Pictures
- Distributed by: Monogram Pictures
- Release date: December 20, 1947
- Running time: 57 minutes
- Country: United States
- Language: English

Gun Talk is a 1947 American Western film directed by Lambert Hillyer and written by J. Benton Cheney. The film stars Johnny Mack Brown, Raymond Hatton, Christine McIntyre, Douglas Evans, Geneva Gray and Wheaton Chambers. The film was released on December 20, 1947, by Monogram Pictures.

== Cast ==
- Johnny Mack Brown as Johnny McVey
- Raymond Hatton as Lucky Danvers
- Christine McIntyre as Daisy Cameron
- Douglas Evans as Rod Jackson
- Geneva Gray as June Forbes
- Wheaton Chambers as Herkimer Stone
- Frank LaRue as Simpson
- Ted Adams as Tim
- Carl Mathews as Pepper
- Zon Murray as Nolan
- Cactus Mack as Marshal Wetherby
- Carol Henry as Burke
- Bill Hale as Joe
- Boyd Stockman as Red Diggs
- Roy Butler as Gus
- Bob McElroy as Pete
