= The Fighting Ranger (1948 film) =

1948 American Western film

- Theatrical release poster
- Directed by: Lambert Hillyer
- Screenplay by: Ronald Davidson
- Produced by: Barney Sarecky
- Starring: Johnny Mack Brown; Raymond Hatton; Christine Larson; Marshall Reed; Eddie Parker; Charlie Hughes
- Cinematography: Harry Neumann
- Edited by: Carl Pierson
- Production company: Monogram Pictures
- Distributed by: Monogram Pictures
- Release date: August 15, 1948
- Running time: 57 minutes
- Country: United States
- Language: English

The Fighting Ranger is a 1948 American Western film directed by Lambert Hillyer and written by Ronald Davidson. The film stars Johnny Mack Brown, Raymond Hatton, Christine Larson, Marshall Reed, Eddie Parker, and Charlie Hughes. The film was released on August 15, 1948, by Monogram Pictures.

== Cast ==
- Johnny Mack Brown as Johnny Brown
- Raymond Hatton as Banty
- Christine Larson as Julie Sinclair
- Marshall Reed as Hack Sinclair
- Eddie Parker as Gill
- Charlie Hughes as Dave Sinclair
- I. Stanford Jolley as Pop Sinclair
- Milburn Morante as Gus
- Steve Clark as Ward Henderson
- Bob Woodward as Bender
- Peter Perkins as Adams
