= The Gunman from Bodie =

1941 film directed by Spencer Gordon Bennet

- Theatrical release poster
- Directed by: Spencer Gordon Bennet
- Screenplay by: Adele Buffington
- Produced by: Scott R. Dunlap
- Starring: Buck Jones; Tim McCoy; Raymond Hatton; Christine McIntyre; Dave O'Brien; Robert Frazer
- Cinematography: Harry Neumann
- Edited by: Carl Pierson
- Production company: Monogram Pictures
- Distributed by: Monogram Pictures
- Release date: September 26, 1941
- Running time: 62 minutes
- Country: United States
- Language: English

The Gunman from Bodie is a 1941 American Western film directed by Spencer Gordon Bennet and written by Jess Bowers. This is the second film in Monogram Pictures' Rough Riders series, and stars Buck Jones as Marshal Buck Roberts, Tim McCoy as Marshal Tim McCall and Raymond Hatton as Marshal Sandy Hopkins, with Christine McIntyre, Dave O'Brien and Robert Frazer. The film was released on September 26, 1941.

== Plot ==
The Rough Riders trio returns in this second entry of the Rough Riders series. The three lawmen are tracking a ruthless gang of cattle rustlers terrorizing the region. On a stormy night, Buck (posing as the notorious outlaw "Bob 'Bodie' Bronson," a wanted killer) seeks shelter and discovers a murdered rancher couple and their orphaned baby. This grim crime fuels the Riders' determination to bring justice.

To infiltrate the gang and uncover its hidden leader—who is also scheming to seize control of the area's vital water rights—the marshals split up and go undercover: Buck maintains his dangerous alias as the gunman from Bodie to gain the outlaws' trust, Tim pursues him as if he's a legitimate lawman hunting the fugitive, and Sandy disguises himself as a humble cook to gather information from the inside.

Amid shootouts, deception, and frontier justice, the trio protects local ranchers, safeguards the orphaned infant, and works to expose the mastermind behind the rustling and land-grabbing scheme before more innocent lives are lost.

== Cast ==
- Buck Jones as Marshal Buck Roberts aka Bob 'Bodie' Bronson
- Tim McCoy as Marshal Tim McCall
- Raymond Hatton as Sandy Hopkins
- Christine McIntyre as Alice Borden
- Dave O'Brien as Joe Martin
- Robert Frazer as Wyatt
- Charles King as Steve Dunn
- Lynton Brent as Red
- Max Waizmann as Sheriff Cox
- Gene Alsace as Henchman
- John Merton as Bill Cook
- Frank LaRue as Jud Mason
- Silver as Silver
