= Wanted: Dead or Alive (1951 film) =

1951 film

- Directed by: Thomas Carr
- Written by: Clint Johnston; Harry L. Fraser
- Produced by: Vincent M. Fennelly
- Starring: Whip Wilson; Fuzzy Knight; Christine McIntyre
- Cinematography: Ernest Miller
- Edited by: Sam Fields
- Music by: Raoul Kraushaar
- Production company: Transwestern Pictures
- Distributed by: Monogram Pictures
- Release date: April 3, 1951
- Running time: 58 minutes
- Country: United States
- Language: English

Wanted: Dead or Alive is a 1951 American Western film directed by Thomas Carr and starring Whip Wilson, Fuzzy Knight and Christine McIntyre. The film was distributed as a second feature by Monogram Pictures. It was shot partly at the Iverson Ranch in California and its sets were designed by the art directors Dave Milton and Fred Preble. Wanted: Dead or Alive is the first of a series of films pairing Wilson and Knight.

== Plot ==
A gang is freeing wanted outlaws from jail and then killing them in order to claim the reward money. Three marshals plan to infiltrate the gang, with one of them posing as an outlaw, to bring them to justice.

== Cast ==
- Whip Wilson as Marshal Whip Wilson
- Fuzzy Knight as Texas
- Jim Bannon as U. S. Marshal Jim Bannon
- Christine McIntyre as Spangles Calhoun
- Leonard Penn as Sid Taggart
- Lane Bradford as Utah Grant
- Zon Murray as Mike
- Marshall Reed as Sheriff Jeff
- Stanley Price as John Meade
- Buddy Roosevelt as Jed Lewis
- George DeNormand as Bart Richards

== Bibliography ==
- Drew, Bernard A. Motion Picture Series and Sequels: A Reference Guide. Routledge, 2013.
