= Shadows on the Range =

1946 film directed by Lambert Hillyer

- Theatrical release poster
- Directed by: Lambert Hillyer
- Screenplay by: Adele Buffington
- Produced by: Scott R. Dunlap
- Starring: Johnny Mack Brown; Raymond Hatton; Jan Bryant; Jack Perrin; John Merton; Marshall Reed
- Cinematography: James S. Brown Jr.
- Edited by: Fred Maguire
- Production company: Monogram Pictures
- Distributed by: Monogram Pictures
- Release date: October 16, 1946
- Running time: 57 minutes
- Country: United States
- Language: English

Shadows on the Range is a 1946 American Western film directed by Lambert Hillyer and written by Adele Buffington. The film stars Johnny Mack Brown, Raymond Hatton, Jan Bryant, Jack Perrin, John Merton and Marshall Reed. The film was released on October 16, 1946, by Monogram Pictures.

== Cast ==
- Johnny Mack Brown as Steve Mason / Steve Saunders
- Raymond Hatton as Dusty Cripps
- Jan Bryant as Ruth Denny
- Jack Perrin as Ted
- John Merton as Paul Emery
- Marshall Reed as Butch Bevans
- Steve Clark as Sheriff Skinner
- Ted Adams as Bart Brennan
- Terry Frost as Bill Cole
- Pierce Lyden as Ed
- Cactus Mack as Lefty
- Roy Butler as Sleepy
