= Frontier Feud =

1945 film directed by Lambert Hillyer

- Theatrical release poster
- Directed by: Lambert Hillyer
- Screenplay by: Adele Buffington
- Based on: The Last Outpost in Hell by Charles N. Heckelmann
- Produced by: Charles J. Bigelow
- Starring: Johnny Mack Brown; Raymond Hatton; Dennis Moore; Christine McIntyre; Jack Ingram; Eddie Parker
- Cinematography: Harry Neumann
- Edited by: Dan Milner
- Production company: Monogram Pictures
- Distributed by: Monogram Pictures
- Release date: November 24, 1945
- Running time: 54 minutes
- Country: United States
- Language: English

Frontier Feud is a 1945 American Western film directed by Lambert Hillyer and written by Adele Buffington. This is the eighteenth film in the "Marshal Nevada Jack McKenzie" series, and stars Johnny Mack Brown as Jack McKenzie and Raymond Hatton as his sidekick Sandy Hopkins, with Dennis Moore, Christine McIntyre, Jack Ingram and Eddie Parker. The film was released on November 24, 1945, by Monogram Pictures.

== Cast ==
- Johnny Mack Brown as Nevada Jack McKenzie
- Raymond Hatton as Sandy Hopkins
- Dennis Moore as Joe Davis
- Christine McIntyre as Blanche Corey
- Jack Ingram as Don Graham
- Eddie Parker as Sam Murphy
- Frank LaRue as Chalmers
- Steve Clark as Bill Corey
- Jack Rockwell as Sheriff Clancy
- Mary MacLaren as Sarah Moran
- Edmund Cobb as Moran
- Lloyd Ingraham as Si Peters
- Ted Mapes as Slade Burnett
