= Eddie Parker (actor) =

American actor (1900–1960)

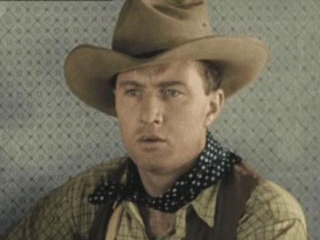
- Parker in The Lucky Texan (1934)
- Born: December 12, 1900; Waukegan, Illinois, U.S.
- Died: January 20, 1960 (aged 59); Panorama City, California, U.S.
- Resting place: Calvary Cemetery
- Occupations: Actor, stuntman
- Years active: 1932–1960

Eddie Parker (December 12, 1900 – January 20, 1960) was an American stuntman and actor who appeared in many classic films, mostly westerns and horror films.

Some of his more famous films and serials include the 1943 "Batman" (as Lewis Wilson's stunt double), The Crimson Ghost, Abbott and Costello Meet the Mummy (as the Mummy), and Rear Window for Alfred Hitchcock as well as many classic Universal horror films. He appeared three times in the early television series, Tales of the Texas Rangers, and also performed stunts for that program.

Parker died of a heart attack in 1960.

== Selected filmography ==
- The Ghost Rider (1935)
- Frankenstein Meets the Wolf Man (1943)
- Days of Old Cheyenne (1943)
- Black Arrow (1944)
- Trigger Fingers (1946)
- Raiders of the South (1947)
- Trailing Danger (1947)
- Shadow Valley (1947)
- Valley of Fear (1947)
- The Fighting Ranger (1948)
- Law of the West (1949)
- Abbott and Costello Meet Dr. Jekyll and Mr. Hyde (1953)
- Rear Window (1954) - Detective (uncredited)
- Abbott and Costello Meet the Mummy (1955)
- The Spoilers (1955)
- Tarantula! (1955)
- Monster on the Campus (1958)
- Curse of the Undead (1959)
