= The Lost Trail (1945 film) =

1945 film by Lambert Hillyer

- Theatrical release poster
- Directed by: Lambert Hillyer
- Screenplay by: Adele Buffington
- Produced by: Scott R. Dunlap
- Starring: Johnny Mack Brown; Raymond Hatton; Jennifer Holt; Riley Hill; Kenneth MacDonald; Eddie Parker
- Cinematography: Marcel Le Picard
- Edited by: Dan Milner
- Production company: Monogram Pictures
- Distributed by: Monogram Pictures
- Release date: October 20, 1945
- Running time: 53 minutes
- Country: United States
- Language: English

The Lost Trail is a 1945 American Western film directed by Lambert Hillyer and written by Adele Buffington. This is the seventeenth film in the "Marshal Nevada Jack McKenzie" series, and stars Johnny Mack Brown as Jack McKenzie and Raymond Hatton as his sidekick Sandy Hopkins, with Jennifer Holt, Riley Hill, Kenneth MacDonald and Eddie Parker. The film was released on October 20, 1945, by Monogram Pictures.

== Cast ==
- Johnny Mack Brown as Nevada Jack McKenzie
- Raymond Hatton as Sandy Hopkins / Trigger
- Jennifer Holt as Jane Burns
- Riley Hill as Ned Turner
- Kenneth MacDonald as John Corbett
- Eddie Parker as Bill
- John Ince as Bailey
- Frank LaRue as Jones
- Steve Clark as Mason
- Milburn Morante as Zeke
- Lynton Brent as Hall
- Frank McCarroll as Joe
- Dick Dickinson as Ed
- Henry Vroom as Tom
