= The Stranger from Pecos =

1943 American Western film

- Theatrical release poster
- Directed by: Lambert Hillyer
- Screenplay by: Adele Buffington
- Produced by: Scott R. Dunlap
- Starring: Johnny Mack Brown; Raymond Hatton; Kirby Grant; Christine McIntyre; Steve Clark; Edmund Cobb
- Cinematography: Harry Neumann
- Edited by: Carl Pierson
- Production company: Monogram Pictures
- Distributed by: Monogram Pictures
- Release date: July 10, 1943
- Running time: 55 minutes
- Country: United States
- Language: English

The Stranger from Pecos is a 1943 American Western film directed by Lambert Hillyer and written by Adele Buffington. This is the second film in the "Marshal Nevada Jack McKenzie" series, and stars Johnny Mack Brown as Jack McKenzie and Raymond Hatton as his sidekick Sandy Hopkins, with Kirby Grant, Christine McIntyre, Steve Clark and Edmund Cobb. The film was released on July 10, 1943, by Monogram Pictures.

== Cast ==
- Johnny Mack Brown as Nevada Jack McKenzie
- Raymond Hatton as Sandy Hopkins
- Kirby Grant as Tom Barstow
- Christine McIntyre as Ruth Martin
- Steve Clark as Clem Martin
- Edmund Cobb as Bert Salem
- Sam Flint as Jonathan Ward
- Charles King as Harmon
- Roy Barcroft as Sheriff Ben
- Bud Osborne as Gus
- Artie Ortego as Ed
- Lynton Brent as Deputy Joe
- Milburn Morante as Pete
- Robert Frazer as Bill Barstow
- Frosty Royce as Henchman
- Kermit Maynard as Bud Salem
