= The Texas Kid =

1943 film directed by Lambert Hillyer

- Directed by: Lambert Hillyer
- Written by: Adele Buffington; Lynton Brent
- Produced by: Scott R. Dunlap
- Starring: Johnny Mack Brown; Raymond Hatton; Marshall Reed
- Cinematography: Harry Neumann
- Edited by: Carl Pierson
- Music by: Frank Sanucci
- Production company: Monogram Pictures
- Distributed by: Monogram Pictures
- Release date: November 26, 1943
- Running time: 57 minutes
- Country: United States
- Language: English

The Texas Kid is a 1943 American Western film directed by Lambert Hillyer. This is the fifth film in the "Marshal Nevada Jack McKenzie" series, and stars Johnny Mack Brown as Jack McKenzie and Raymond Hatton as his sidekick Sandy Hopkins, with Marshall Reed, Shirley Patterson and Robert Fiske.

== Cast ==
- Johnny Mack Brown as Nevada Jack McKenzie
- Raymond Hatton as Sandy Hopkins
- Marshall Reed as MacLaine - aka The Texas Kid
- Shirley Patterson as Nancy Drew
- Robert Fiske as Naylor
- Edmund Cobb as Scully
- George J. Lewis as Murdered Stage Driver
- Cyril Ring as Tim Atwood
- Lynton Brent as Jess - Henchman
- Stanley Price as Ed - Henchman
- Bud Osborne as Steve - Henchman
- Kermit Maynard as Alex - Henchman

== Bibliography ==
- Martin, Len D. The Allied Artists Checklist: The Feature Films and Short Subjects of Allied Artists Pictures Corporation, 1947-1978. McFarland & Company, 1993.
