= Land of the Outlaws =

1944 film directed by Lambert Hillyer

- Directed by: Lambert Hillyer
- Written by: Joseph O'Donnell
- Produced by: Charles J. Bigelow
- Starring: Johnny Mack Brown; Raymond Hatton; Nan Holliday
- Cinematography: Harry Neumann
- Edited by: John C. Fuller
- Music by: Edward J. Kay
- Production company: Monogram Pictures
- Distributed by: Monogram Pictures
- Release date: September 16, 1944
- Running time: 56 minutes
- Country: United States
- Language: English

Land of the Outlaws is a 1944 American Western film directed by Lambert Hillyer. This is the eleventh film in the "Marshal Nevada Jack McKenzie" series, and stars Johnny Mack Brown as Jack McKenzie and Raymond Hatton as his sidekick Sandy Hopkins, with Nan Holliday, Stephen Keyes and Hugh Prosser.

== Cast ==
- Johnny Mack Brown as Marshal Nevada Jack McKenzie
- Raymond Hatton as Marshal Sandy Hopkins
- Nan Holliday as Ellen
- Stephen Keyes as Frank Carson
- Hugh Prosser as Ed Hammond
- Charles King as Bart Green
- Tom Quinn as Vic - Henchman
- Steve Clark as Sheriff
- John Merton as Dan Broderick
- Ben Corbett as Curly - Wagon Driver
- Art Fowler as Slim Carter
- Bud Wolfe as Drake - Saloon Dealer
- John Judd as Jim Grant - Assayer

== Bibliography ==
- Martin, Len D. The Allied Artists Checklist: The Feature Films and Short Subjects of Allied Artists Pictures Corporation, 1947-1978. McFarland & Company, 1993.
