= The Navajo Trail =

1945 film by Howard Bretherton

- Theatrical release poster
- Directed by: Howard Bretherton
- Screenplay by: Frank H. Young
- Story by: Adele Buffington
- Produced by: Scott R. Dunlap
- Starring: Johnny Mack Brown; Raymond Hatton; Jennifer Holt; Riley Hill; Edmund Cobb; Ray Bennett
- Cinematography: Marcel Le Picard
- Edited by: Arthur H. Bell
- Production company: Monogram Pictures
- Distributed by: Monogram Pictures
- Release date: January 15, 1945
- Running time: 56 minutes
- Country: United States
- Language: English

The Navajo Trail is a 1945 American Western film directed by Howard Bretherton and written by Frank H. Young. This is the fourteenth film in the "Marshal Nevada Jack McKenzie" series, and stars Johnny Mack Brown as Jack McKenzie and Raymond Hatton as his sidekick Sandy Hopkins, with Jennifer Holt, Riley Hill, Edmund Cobb and Ray Bennett. The film was released on January 15, 1945, by Monogram Pictures.

== Cast ==
- Johnny Mack Brown as Nevada Jack McKenzie / Rocky Saunders
- Raymond Hatton as Sandy Hopkins
- Jennifer Holt as Mary Trevor
- Riley Hill as Paul Mason
- Edmund Cobb as Jack Farr
- Ray Bennett as Slim Ramsey
- Charles King as Red
- Tom Quinn as Tober
- Mary MacLaren as Stella Ramsey
- Bud Osborne as Bert
- Earl Crawford as Joe
- Johnny Carpenter as Steve
- Jim Hood as Rusty Hanover
- Jasper Palmer as Sgt. Trevor
