= Law Men =

1944 film by Lambert Hillyer

- Film poster
- Directed by: Lambert Hillyer
- Written by: Glenn Tryon (story and screenplay)
- Produced by: Charles J. Bigelow (supervising producer)
- Starring: See below
- Cinematography: Harry Neumann
- Edited by: John C. Fuller
- Distributed by: Monogram Pictures
- Release date: April 1944
- Running time: 58 minutes 54 minutes (American Alpha Video Print)
- Country: United States
- Language: English

Law Men is a 1944 American Western film directed by Lambert Hillyer, and released by Monogram Pictures. This is the eighth film in the "Marshal Nevada Jack McKenzie" series, and stars Johnny Mack Brown as Jack McKenzie and Raymond Hatton as his sidekick Sandy Hopkins, with Jan Wiley, Kirby Grant and Robert Frazer.

The film is also known as Lawmen (American alternative spelling).

== Plot ==
Two United States Marshals ride into the town of Verdine undercover and separately. The town has been plagued by recurring robberies of the same bank and the stagecoach when shipments of gold are aboard. Sandy rides in during a bank robbery in progress and kills one of the robbers. Posing as a cobbler Sandy is dismayed when the town rewards him with the vacant fully equipped shop of the deceased cobbler, a trade Sandy knows nothing about. Jack trails the outlaw gang and poses as an outlaw on the run to join the gang to replace their late member. Both law men realize that the gang is getting inside information on the bank and the gold shipments and must identify the source before bringing the outlaws to justice.

== Cast ==
- Johnny Mack Brown as U.S. Marshal "Nevada" Jack McKenzie
- Raymond Hatton as U.S. Marshal "Sandy" Hopkins
- Jan Wiley as Phyliss
- Kirby Grant as Clyde Miller
- Robert Frazer as Banker Bradford
- Edmund Cobb as Slade
- Art Fowler as Gus, Chief Henchman
- Hal Price as "Pop" Haynes
- Marshall Reed as Henchman Killifer
- Isabel Withers as Auntie Mack
- Ben Corbett as Henchman Simmons
- Ted Mapes as Curly Balou, Stage Driver
- Steve Clark as Henchman Hardy
- Bud Osborne as Henchman Wilson

== Soundtrack ==
- Raymond Hatton - "The Ballad of Jesse James"
