= Stranger from Santa Fe =

1945 film directed by Lambert Hillyer

- Theatrical release poster
- Directed by: Lambert Hillyer
- Screenplay by: Adele Buffington
- Based on: Pilgrim Ramrod for Hell's Range by Charles N. Heckelmann
- Produced by: Scott R. Dunlap
- Starring: Johnny Mack Brown; Raymond Hatton; Beatrice Gray; Joan Curtis; Jimmy Martin; Jack Ingram
- Cinematography: Harry Neumann
- Edited by: Jack Milner
- Music by: Frank Sanucci
- Production company: Monogram Pictures
- Distributed by: Monogram Pictures
- Release date: May 15, 1945
- Running time: 57 minutes
- Country: United States
- Language: English

Stranger from Santa Fe is a 1945 American Western film directed by Lambert Hillyer and written by Adele Buffington. This is the sixteenth film in the "Marshal Nevada Jack McKenzie" series, and stars Johnny Mack Brown as Jack McKenzie and Raymond Hatton as his sidekick Sandy Hopkins, with Beatrice Gray, Joan Curtis, Jimmy Martin and Jack Ingram. The film was released on May 15, 1945, by Monogram Pictures.

== Cast ==
- Johnny Mack Brown as Nevada McKenzie aka Roy Ferris
- Raymond Hatton as Sandy Hopkins
- Beatrice Gray as Marcia Earley
- Joan Curtis as Beth Grimes
- Jimmy Martin as Dan Murray
- Jack Ingram as Ned Grimes
- John Merton as Cy Manning
- Tom Quinn as Bill
- Steve Clark as Sheriff
- Jack Rockwell as Stagecoach Driver
- Bud Osborne as Clint
- Hal Price as Hymer
