= Law of the Valley =

1944 film directed by Howard Bretherton

- Directed by: Howard Bretherton
- Written by: Joseph O'Donnell
- Produced by: Charles J. Bigelow
- Starring: Johnny Mack Brown; Raymond Hatton; Lynne Carver
- Cinematography: Marcel Le Picard
- Edited by: John M. Foley
- Music by: Edward J. Kay
- Production company: Monogram Pictures
- Distributed by: Monogram Pictures
- Release date: November 4, 1944
- Running time: 52 minutes
- Country: United States
- Language: English

Law of the Valley is a 1944 American Western film directed by Howard Bretherton. This is the twelfth film in the "Marshal Nevada Jack McKenzie" series, and stars Johnny Mack Brown as Jack McKenzie and Raymond Hatton as his sidekick Sandy Hopkins, with Lynne Carver, Kirk Barron and Edmund Cobb.

== Cast ==
- Johnny Mack Brown as Marshal Nevada McKenzie
- Raymond Hatton as Marshal Sandy Hopkins
- Lynne Carver as Ann Jennings
- Kirk Barron as Tom Findley
- Edmund Cobb as Dan Stanton
- Charles King as Miller - Henchman
- Tom Quinn as Condon - Henchman
- Steve Clark as Slim Roberts - Henchman
- Hal Price as Sheriff
- Marshall Reed as Al Green - Henchman
- George DeNormand as Red Adams - Henchman
- George Morrell as Jennings - Rancher
- Charles McMurphy as Bartender

== Bibliography ==
- Martin, Len D. The Allied Artists Checklist: The Feature Films and Short Subjects of Allied Artists Pictures Corporation, 1947-1978. McFarland & Company, 1993.
