= Partners of the Trail (1944 film) =

1944 film directed by Lambert Hillyer

- Directed by: Lambert Hillyer
- Written by: Frank H. Young
- Produced by: Trem Carr
- Starring: Johnny Mack Brown; Raymond Hatton; Christine McIntyre
- Cinematography: Harry Neumann
- Edited by: Carl Himm
- Music by: Edward J. Kay
- Production company: Monogram Pictures
- Distributed by: Monogram Pictures
- Release date: March 28, 1944
- Running time: 57 minutes
- Country: United States
- Language: English

Partners of the Trail is a 1944 American Western film directed by Lambert Hillyer. This is the seventh film in the "Marshal Nevada Jack McKenzie" series, and stars Johnny Mack Brown as Jack McKenzie and Raymond Hatton as his sidekick Sandy Hopkins, with Craig Woods, Christine McIntyre and Marshall Reed.

== Cast ==
- Johnny Mack Brown as U.S. Marshal Nevada Jack McKenzie
- Raymond Hatton as U.S. Marshal Sandy Hopkins
- Craig Woods as Joel Dixon
- Christine McIntyre as Kate Hilton
- Marshall Reed as Clint Baker - Henchman
- Joseph Eggenton as J.D. Edwards
- Jack Ingram as Deputy Trigger
- Hal Price as Sheriff Dobbey
- Lynton Brent as Lem - Henchman
- Lloyd Ingraham as Doc Applegate
- Ben Corbett as Duke - Henchman
- Ted Mapes as Slinkky - Henchman
- Steve Clark as Colby - Rancher

== Bibliography ==
- Martin, Len D. The Allied Artists Checklist: The Feature Films and Short Subjects of Allied Artists Pictures Corporation, 1947-1978. McFarland & Company, 1993.
