= Vin Taylor =

American art director

- Born: April 3, 1896; Marshall, Illinois, United States
- Died: January 27, 1961 (aged 64); Los Angeles, California, United States
- Occupation: Art director
- Years active: 1935–1960 (film & TV)

Vin Taylor (1896–1961) was an American set designer active in American cinema and television from the 1930s to the 1960s.

== Selected filmography ==
- Kentucky Blue Streak (1935)
- Skybound (1935)
- Suicide Squad (1935)
- Rip Roaring Riley (1935)
- The Reckless Way (1936)
- Special Agent K-7 (1936)
- I'll Name the Murderer (1936)
- A Million to One (1937)
- Two Gun Man from Harlem (1938)
- California Frontier (1938)
- The Duke Is Tops (1938)
- Life Goes On (1938)
- Code of the Fearless (1939)
- The Bronze Buckaroo (1939)
- The Utah Kid (1944)
- Marked Trails (1944)
- The Strange Mr. Gregory (1945)
- The Jade Mask (1945)
- Sensation Hunters (1945)
- Riders of the Dawn (1945)
- South of Monterey (1946)
- Beauty and the Bandit (1946)
- Stars Over Texas (1946)
- Moon Over Montana (1946)
- Song of the Sierras (1946)
- Riding the California Trail (1947)
- Six-Gun Serenade (1947)
- King of the Bandits (1947)
- The Law Comes to Gunsight (1947)
- Yankee Fakir (1947)
- Cowboy Cavalier (1948)
- Oklahoma Blues (1948)
- Panhandle (1948)
- Song of the Drifter (1948)
- Courtin' Trouble (1948)
- Outlaw Brand (1948)
- Range Renegades (1948)
- Partners of the Sunset (1948)
- The Rangers Ride (1948)
- Albuquerque (1948)
- Frontier Agent (1948)
- The Fighting Ranger (1948)
- Hidden Danger (1948)
- Crashing Thru (1949)
- Law of the West (1949)
- Roaring Westward (1949)
- Shadows of the West (1949)
- The Fighting Redhead (1949)
- Range Justice (1949)
- Brand of Fear (1949)
- Stampede (1949)
- Across the Rio Grande (1949)
- Cowboy and the Prizefighter (1949)
- Roll, Thunder, Roll! (1949)
- Ride, Ryder, Ride! (1949)
- Fence Riders (1950)
- Short Grass (1950)
- Law of the Panhandle (1950)
- The Return of Jesse James (1950)
- The Bandit Queen (1950)
- Cattle Queen (1951)
- The Lion Hunters (1951)
- Elephant Stampede (1951)
- Texas Lawmen (1951)
- The Longhorn (1951)
- The Girl on the Bridge (1951)
- The Steel Fist (1952)
- Sea Tiger (1952)
- The Great Jesse James Raid (1953)
- Secret of Outlaw Flats (1953)
- The Desperado (1954)
- Bitter Creek (1954)
- The Forty-Niners (1954)
- Two Guns and a Badge (1954)
- The Quiet Gun (1957)

== Bibliography ==
- Marshall, Wendy L. William Beaudine: From Silents to Television. Scarecrow Press, 2005.
- Renzi, Thomas C. ''Cornell Woolrich from Pulp Noir to Film Noir. McFarland, 2015.
