= Gun Runner (film) =

1949 film by Lambert Hillyer

- Theatrical release poster
- Directed by: Lambert Hillyer
- Screenplay by: J. Benton Cheney
- Produced by: Louis Gray
- Starring: Jimmy Wakely; Dub Taylor; Noel Neill; Mae Clarke; Kenne Duncan; Marshall Reed
- Cinematography: Harry Neumann
- Edited by: Carl Pierson; John C. Fuller
- Production company: Monogram Pictures
- Distributed by: Monogram Pictures
- Release date: January 30, 1949
- Running time: 56 minutes
- Country: United States
- Language: English

Gun Runner is a 1949 American Western film directed by Lambert Hillyer and written by J. Benton Cheney. The film stars Jimmy Wakely, Dub Taylor, Noel Neill, Mae Clarke, Kenne Duncan, and Marshall Reed. The film was released on January 30, 1949, by Monogram Pictures.

== Plot ==
Kate Diamond owns the Roaring Falls Trading Post, from where she directs her gang's gun-smuggling to the Indians. After she shortchanges smuggler Stacey, his men attempt to steal the hidden guns and attack her foreman, Nebraska, but Nebraska is saved by Jimmy and "Cannonball" as they head to file a homestead claim in Canyon City. Jimmy renews an old acquaintance with Sheriff Harris and his daughter, Jessica. The sheriff is wounded by half-breed Danny when he finds a rifle hidden in the latter's wagon, but Jimmy captures the outlaw, a go-between for Kate and the Indians. Wounded and in bed, Sheriff Harris asks Jimmy not to tell Jessica that she is only adopted and that Nebraska is really her father, although he believes her to be dead. Danny is allowed to escape, and Jimmy follows him to Kate's trading post, where she kills him, pretending self-defense in order to allay Jimmy's suspicions. Kate persuades Jessica to take Harris to another doctor in Lansing, so she can secretly hide the guns in the wagon and get through the blockade Jimmy has set up on all the roads.

== Cast ==
- Jimmy Wakely as Jimmy Wakely
- Dub Taylor as Cannonball
- Noel Neill as Jessica Harris
- Mae Clarke as Kate Diamond
- Kenne Duncan as Nebraska
- Marshall Reed as Riley
- Steve Clark as Sheriff Ted Harris
- Ted Adams as Danny Fox
- Bud Osborne as Burt
- Carol Henry as Stacey
- Bob Woodward as Sam
