= Gallant Lady =

Gallant Lady may refer to:

- Gallant Lady (1934 film)
- Gallant Lady (1942 film)
- Gallant Lady (yacht)
