= Valley of Fire (disambiguation) =

Valley of Fire is a state park in Nevada, United States.

It may also refer to:

- Valley of Fire (album), a 2023 album by El Ten Eleven
- Valley of Fire (film), a 1951 American Western film
