= Reno Browne =

American actress

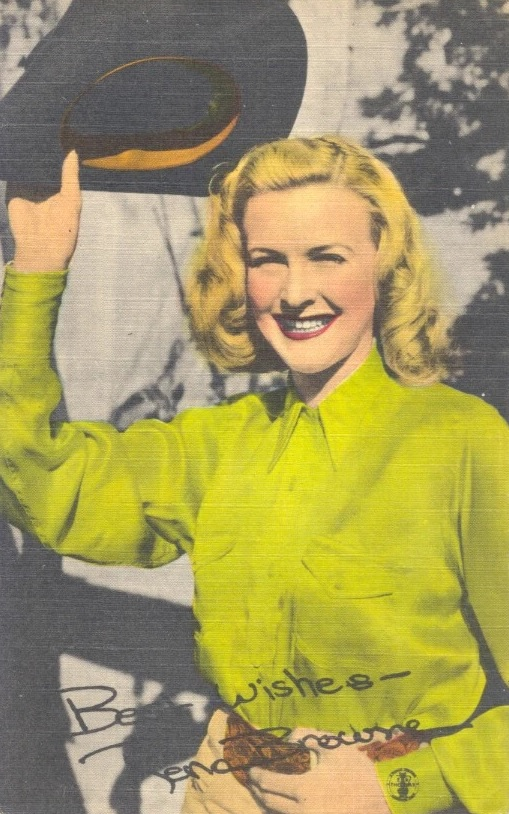
- Born: Josephine Ruth Clarke; 1921; Reno, Nevada, U.S.
- Died: May 15, 1991 (aged 70); Reno, Nevada, US
- Other name: Reno Blair
- Occupations: Film actress, equestrian, pilot
- Years active: 1940s–1950s
- Spouse: Lash LaRue

Reno Browne was the stage name of Josephine Ruth Clarke (April 20, 1921 – May 15, 1991), an American equestrian and B-movie actress during the late 1940s and into the 1950s, with most of her films being in 1949. She was sometimes billed as Reno Blair.

== Early life ==
She was born in Reno, Nevada, to wealthy parents. Her father was a successful attorney.

Browne graduated from a Dominican convent in San Rafael in 1941.

== Career ==
Browne became a licensed pilot. She was proficient at riding horses, and soon became a rodeo queen in the Pacific Northwest. After taking drama lessons, she embarked on a film career, signing a contract with Monogram Pictures.

She was originally billed as "Reno Blair," as she explained in 1985: "When I first signed, I was working with Johnny Mack Brown and [the studio] thought the public would think I was his daughter or something. So they made me use the name Blair. Funny though, his horse's name was Reno, so when I changed my last name to Blair they had to change his horse's name to Rebel."

In total, she starred in 14 westerns of the period, all but one for Monogram. She first worked opposite Johnny Mack Brown, then Whip Wilson, then Jimmy Wakely. In 1949 she launched a 13-episode radio show, Reno Rides Again.

She and Dale Evans were the only western actresses to have their comic books based on their character. Browne had three issues published in 1950 by Marvel Comics. In 1950, Bill Haley and His Saddlemen recorded a single, "My Palomino and I"/"My Sweet Little Girl from Nevada", for Cowboy Records (CR 1701). It was released by "Reno Browne and Her Buckaroos", even though Browne had no connection with the recording (though her photo did appear on the sheet music for the latter song). Also in 1951, she was crowned Clovis Rodeo Queen in Clovis, California.

== Personal life ==
For a period, she was married to western actor Lash LaRue. She retired to Reno, and during the 1980s she attended several western film festivals.

== Death ==
Browne was diagnosed with cancer, and died in Physicians' Hospital for Extended Care in Reno on May 15, 1991.

== Selected filmography ==
- Under Arizona Skies (1946)
- The Law Comes to Gunsight (1947)
- Raiders of the South (1947)
- Frontier Agent (1948)
- Across the Rio Grande (1949)
- Haunted Trails (1949)
- Shadows of the West (1949)
- Range Land (1949)
- Red Rock Outlaw (1949)
- Gunslingers (1950)
