= Sea Tiger (film) =

1952 American film by Frank McDonald

- Directed by: Frank McDonald
- Written by: Charles Yerkow (short story); Samuel Roeca
- Produced by: Wesley Barry; William F. Broidy
- Starring: Marguerite Chapman; John Archer; Harry Lauter
- Cinematography: John J. Martin
- Edited by: Ace Herman
- Music by: Edward J. Kay
- Production company: William F. Broidy Productions
- Distributed by: Monogram Pictures
- Release date: July 27, 1952
- Running time: 71 minutes
- Country: United States
- Language: English

Sea Tiger is a 1952 American action film directed by Frank McDonald and starring Marguerite Chapman, John Archer and Harry Lauter. It is based on Charles Yerkow's short story "Island Freighter". The film sets were designed by the art directors Dave Milton and Vin Taylor. It was distributed by Monogram Pictures.

== Cast ==
- Marguerite Chapman as Jenine Duval
- John Archer as Ben McGrun
- Harry Lauter as Randall, alias Jon Edmun
- Marvin Press as Quick-Boy
- Mara Corday as Lola, Hotel Proprietress
- Ralph Sanford as Fat Harry, Innkeeper
- Lyle Talbot as Mr. Williams, Insurance Man
- Paul McGuire as Bendy
- Sam Flint as Jim Klavier
- John Mylong as J.M. Hennick
- Wayne Mallory as Seaman
- John Reese as Seaman

== Bibliography ==
- Langman, Larry. Return to Paradise: A Guide to South Sea Island Films. Scarecrow Press, 1998.
