= Virginia Belmont =

American actress (1921–2014)

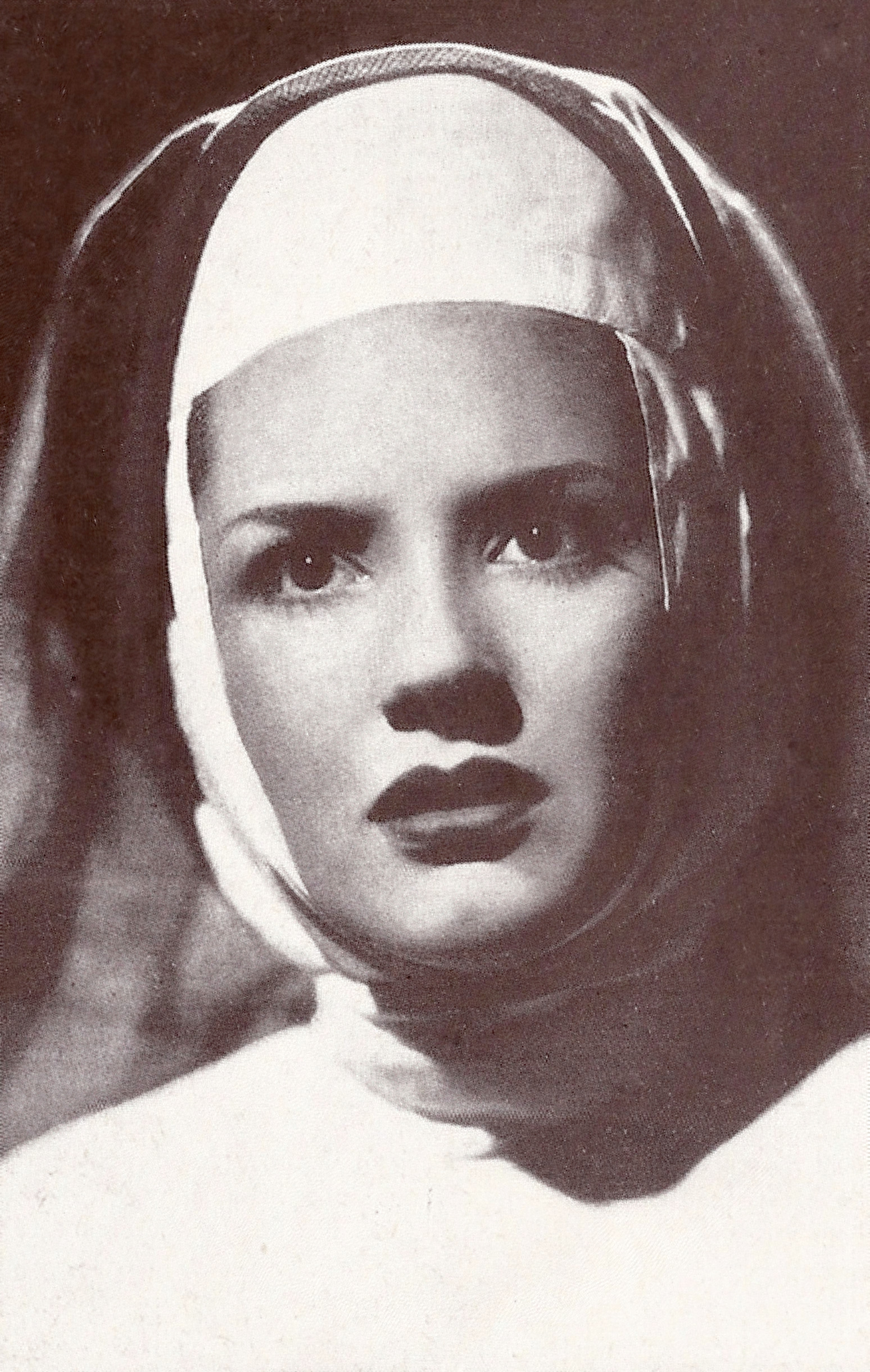
- Born: September 20, 1921; New York City, US
- Died: May 6, 2014 (aged 92); Hollywood, California, US
- Other name: Virginia E. Califano
- Occupation: Film actress

Virginia E. Belmont, also spelled Virginia Belmonte (September 20, 1921 – May 6, 2014), was an American film actress.

Born in New York City, she moved to California as a child. She attended San Diego High School and San Diego State College and graduated from UCLA where she studied Italian and then started working as a cigarette girl at Mocambo. Belmont received her first acting role, uncredited, in the 1944 film Black Arrow. Following a number of supporting roles for Metro-Goldwyn-Mayer and RKO films, she was put under contract with Monogram Pictures, starring in several B-movies as the heroine opposite William Boyd, Jimmy Wakely, and Johnny Mack Brown, among others.

In 1941 Belmont married the native-born Italian restaurateur Albert Califano, and in the late 1940s they moved to Rome, where she continued her film career in the Italian industry, starring in a number of melodrama films, while Califano worked as a correspondent for The Hollywood Reporter. In the late 1950s she retired from acting and moved back in the U.S., where she was employed by United Airlines as a sales representative.

== Selected filmography ==
- Night Taxi (1950)
- The Mysteries of Venice (1951)
- Beauties on Motor Scooters (1952)
- Silent Conflict (1948)
- Oklahoma Blues (1948)
- The Rangers Ride (1948)
- Courtin' Trouble (1948)
- Prairie Express (1947)
