= Haunted Trails =

1949 film

- Theatrical release poster
- Directed by: Lambert Hillyer
- Screenplay by: Adele Buffington
- Produced by: Eddie Davis
- Starring: Whip Wilson; Andy Clyde; Reno Browne; Dennis Moore; I. Stanford Jolley; William Ruhl
- Cinematography: Harry Neumann
- Edited by: John C. Fuller
- Production company: Monogram Pictures
- Distributed by: Monogram Pictures
- Release date: August 21, 1949
- Running time: 58 minutes
- Country: United States
- Language: English

Haunted Trails is a 1949 American Western film directed by Lambert Hillyer and written by Adele Buffington. The film stars Whip Wilson, Andy Clyde, Reno Browne, Dennis Moore, I. Stanford Jolley and William Ruhl. The film was released on August 21, 1949, by Monogram Pictures.

== Cast ==
- Whip Wilson as Whip Wilson
- Andy Clyde as Winks
- Reno Browne as Marie Martel
- Dennis Moore as Phil Rankin
- I. Stanford Jolley as Joe Rankin
- William Ruhl as Gorman
- John Merton as Sheriff Charlie Coombs
- Mary Gordon as Aunt Libby
- Steve Clark as Lew
- Myron Healey as Lassiter
- Milburn Morante as Cookie
- Eddie Majors as Jed
- Bud Osborne as Tom Craig
- Ted Adams as Thompson
