= Ridin' Down the Trail =

1947 film by Howard Bretherton

- Theatrical release poster
- Directed by: Howard Bretherton
- Screenplay by: Bennett Cohen
- Produced by: Bennett Cohen
- Starring: Jimmy Wakely; Dub Taylor; Douglas Fowley; John James; Douglas Aylesworth; Beverly Jons
- Cinematography: James S. Brown Jr.
- Edited by: John C. Fuller
- Production company: Monogram Pictures
- Distributed by: Monogram Pictures
- Release date: October 4, 1947
- Running time: 53 minutes
- Country: United States
- Language: English

Ridin' Down the Trail is a 1947 American Western film directed by Howard Bretherton and written by Bennett Cohen. The film stars Jimmy Wakely, Dub Taylor, Douglas Fowley, John James, Douglas Aylesworth and Beverly Jons. The film was released on October 4, 1947, by Monogram Pictures.

== Cast ==
- Jimmy Wakely as Jimmy Wakely
- Dub Taylor as Cannonball
- Douglas Fowley as Mark Butler
- John James as Dakota
- Douglas Aylesworth as Ed Lancer
- Beverly Jons as Mary Bradon
- Charles King as Brown
- Buster Slaven as Silton
- Kermit Maynard as Allen
- Harry Carr as Tom Bradon
- Milburn Morante as Doc Jackson
- Ted French as Mason
- Post Park as Jeb
- Dick Reinhart as Shorty
- Don Weston as Jack
- Jesse Ashlock as Dick
- Stanley Ellison as Pete
- Wayne Burson as Spike
