= Kay Morley =

Kay Morley may refer to:

- Kay Morley-Brown (born 1963), British hurdler
- Kay Morley (actress) (1920–2020), American actress
