= Riders of the Dawn =

Riders of the Dawn may refer to:

- Riders of the Dawn (1920 film), American silent western film
- Riders of the Dawn (1945 film), American western film
- Riders of the Dawn (1990 film), Spanish film
