= Outlaw Brand =

1948 film

- Theatrical release poster
- Directed by: Lambert Hillyer
- Screenplay by: J. Benton Cheney
- Produced by: Louis Gray
- Starring: Jimmy Wakely; Dub Taylor; Kay Morley; Christine Larson; Tom Chatterton; Leonard Penn
- Cinematography: Harry Neumann
- Edited by: Carl Pierson
- Production company: Monogram Pictures
- Distributed by: Monogram Pictures
- Release date: October 24, 1948
- Running time: 57 minutes
- Country: United States
- Language: English

Outlaw Brand is a 1948 American Western film directed by Lambert Hillyer and written by J. Benton Cheney. The film stars Jimmy Wakely, Dub Taylor, Kay Morley, Christine Larson, Tom Chatterton, and Leonard Penn. The film was released on October 24, 1948, by Monogram Pictures.

== Cast ==
- Jimmy Wakely as Jimmy Wakely
- Dub Taylor as Cannonball
- Kay Morley as Laura Chadwick
- Christine Larson as Monica
- Tom Chatterton as Tom Chadwick
- Leonard Penn as Brent
- John James as Lannigan
- Nolan Leary as Gentry
- Bud Osborne as Sheriff
- Eddie Majors as Ward
- Boyd Stockman as Ed Parker
- Frank McCarroll as Kirk
