= The Kid from Gower Gulch =

- Theatrical release poster
- Directed by: Oliver Drake
- Screenplay by: Elmer Clifton
- Story by: Bob Gilbert
- Produced by: Oliver Drake
- Starring: Spade Cooley; Bob Gilbert; Wanda Cantlon; Jack Baxley; Billy Dix; Joe Hiser
- Cinematography: Harvey Hines
- Edited by: Robert Adams; Ella Bruner
- Production company: Oliver Drake Productions
- Distributed by: Astor Pictures
- Release date: January 15, 1950
- Running time: 53 minutes
- Country: United States
- Language: English

The Kid from Gower Gulch is a 1950 American Western film directed by Oliver Drake and written by Elmer Clifton. The film stars Spade Cooley, Bob Gilbert, Wanda Cantlon, Jack Baxley, Billy Dix and Joe Hiser. The film was released on January 15, 1950, by Astor Pictures.

== Cast ==
- Spade Cooley as Spade Cooley
- Bob Gilbert as Walt Banning
- Wanda Cantlon as Peggy Andrews
- Jack Baxley as Uncle Bill White
- Billy Dix as Ed
- Joe Hiser as Shorty
- Bob Curtis as Tortilla
- Stephen Keyes as Craig Morgan
- William Val as Bart Leeson
