= Walk the Dark Street =

American film noir B-movie

- Directed by: Wyott Ordung
- Written by: Wyott Ordung
- Produced by: Richard Bernstein (associate producer); Tom Michaels (associate producer); Wyott Ordung (producer)
- Starring: Chuck Connors
- Cinematography: Brydon Baker
- Edited by: Leon Barsha
- Music by: Paul Dunlap
- Production company: Associated Artists Productions
- Distributed by: Dominant Pictures Corporation
- Release date: 1956
- Running time: 73 minutes
- Country: United States
- Language: English

Walk the Dark Street is a 1956 American film noir B-movie directed by Wyott Ordung and starring Chuck Connors.

== Plot summary ==
Dan (Don Ross) returns to L.A. having fought in the Korean War. He meets with Frank (Chuck Connors) the brother of Tommy who was one of the men killed under Dan's command. Tommy wasn't happy at being passed over for promotion and wrote to his brother to say that if he died Dan would be to blame.

Frank explains to Dan that his heart condition means he can no longer go big game hunting and makes him a lucrative offer to have a ‘hunt’ in L.A. with both men armed only with camera guns. Unbeknownst to Dan, Frank replaces his camera round with a live bullet and plans to kill him in revenge for his brother's death.

The two men engage in a two-day game of cat and mouse which is complicated by the involvement of Tommy's fiancée and a mix up at a sports shop. As the men finally get each other in their sights who will win and who will die?

== Cast ==
- Chuck Connors as Frank Garrick
- Don Ross as Dan Lawton
- Regina Gleason as Helen Leyden
- Eddie Kafafian as Sergeant Tommy Garrick
- Fred Darian as Nightclub Singer
- Vonne Godfrey as Frank's French Girlfriend
- Ewing Brown as 2nd Sporting Goods Clerk
- Maxwell Lauer as Background Employee
