= Zon Murray =

American actor (1910–1979)

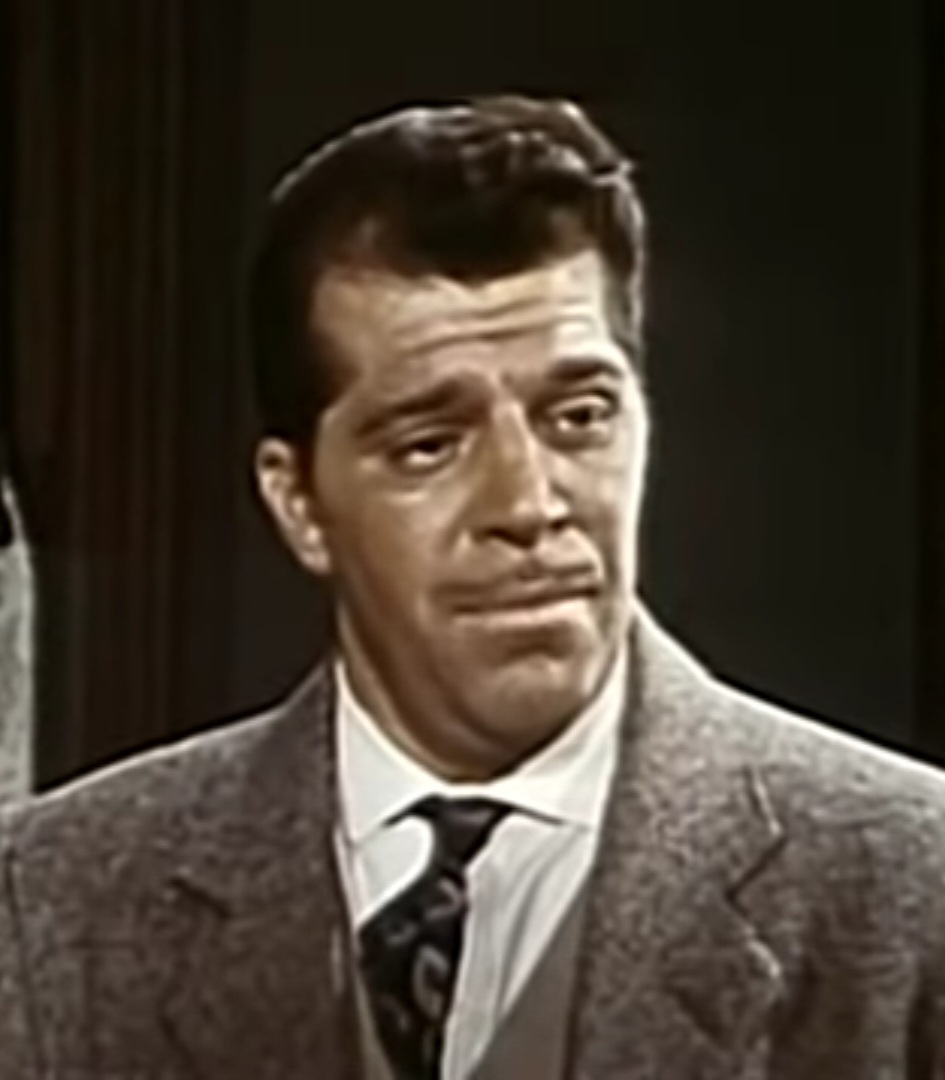
- Murray in an episode of The Cisco Kid (1951)
- Born: Emery Zon Murray; April 13, 1910; St. Joseph, Missouri, U.S.
- Died: February 2, 1979 (aged 68); Palm Springs, California, U.S.
- Resting place: Forest Lawn Memorial Park, Glendale, California
- Occupation: Actor
- Spouse: Dorothy J. Sands
- Children: 2 sons (Gary Zon Murray and Rickey Murray)
- Parent(s): Franklin Lafayette Murray and Dora Edwards (Missouri)

Emery Zon Murray (April 13, 1910 – February 2, 1979) was an American actor.

== Death ==
Zon Murray died in 1979. He is interred at Forest Lawn Memorial Park in Glendale, California.

== Filmography ==
- The El Paso Kid
- Ghost of Hidden Valley
- Song of the Sierras
- Jack Armstrong
- Rainbow Over the Rockies
- West of Dodge City
- The Law Comes to Gunsight
- Code of the Saddle
- Trail of the Mounties
- Oklahoma Blues
- False Paradise
- Grand Canyon Trail
- Blood on the Moon
- Crossed Trails
- Gun Law Justice
- Trails End
- Son of a Bad Man
- Grand Canyon
- The House Across the Street
- Captain China
- The Kid from Texas
- Night Riders of Montana
- Along the Great Divide
- Fort Worth
- Hurricane Island
- Oklahoma Justice
- Pecos River
- Border Saddlemates
- Laramie Mountains
- Montana Territory
- Carson City
- Cripple Creek
- Old Overland Trail
- Born to the Saddle
- On Top of Old Smoky
- The President's Lady
- The Farmer Takes a Wife
- Down Laredo Way
- The Great Adventures of Captain Kidd
- Vigilante Terror
- Motorcycle Gang
- Escape from Red Rock
- Gunsmoke in Tucson
- Requiem for a Gunfighter
