= Red Rock Outlaw =

1949 film by Elmer Clifton

- Film poster
- Directed by: Elmer Clifton
- Written by: Elmer Clifton; Anita V. M. Robertson; Bob Gilbert
- Produced by: Raymond Friedgen; Elmer Clifton
- Cinematography: Richard E. Cunha; James V. Murray
- Production company: Raymond Friedgen Productions
- Distributed by: Astor Pictures
- Release date: December 16, 1949
- Running time: 57 minutes
- Country: United States
- Language: English

Red Rock Outlaw is a 1949 American musical Western film directed by Elmer Clifton.

== Cast ==
- Bob Gilbert as Terry Larson / Jeff Larson
- Ione Nixon as Carolina
- Lee 'Lasses' White as 'Lasses' White
- Forrest Matthews as Jim Martin
- Billy Dix as Sheriff
- Reno Browne as Reno - troupe driver manager
- Wanda Cantlon as Daisy Nell - singer / dancer
- Tennessee Jim as Tennessee Jim
- Ginny Jackson as troupe member
- Joyce Gardner as troupe member
- Pinksy Patek as troupe member
- Johnny Bias as gambler
- Ewing Miles Brown as gambler
- Clint Johnson as The Parson
- Eddie Majors as gambler
- Billy McCoy as deputy
- Whitey Hughes as Henchman
