= Fargo (1952 film) =

1952 film by Lewis D. Collins

- Directed by: Lewis D. Collins
- Written by: Jack DeWitt; Joseph F. Poland
- Produced by: Vincent M. Fennelly
- Starring: Wild Bill Elliott; Myron Healey; Phyllis Coates
- Cinematography: Ernest Miller
- Edited by: Sam Fields
- Music by: Raoul Kraushaar
- Production company: Silvermine Productions
- Distributed by: Monogram Pictures
- Release date: September 3, 1952 (Los Angeles)
- Running time: 69 minutes
- Country: United States
- Language: English

Fargo is a 1952 American Western film directed by Lewis D. Collins and starring Wild Bill Elliott, Myron Healey and Phyllis Coates.

== Plot ==
After his brother’s murder by ruthless ranchers, Bill Martin uses barbed wire to construct a fence around the ranch that they had inherited from their father in the Dakota Territory. Amid tensions between ranchers and homesteaders, Bill receives the help of cattleman Loren McKenzie and his daughter Kathy.

== Cast ==
- Wild Bill Elliott as Bill Martin
- Myron Healey as Red Olsen
- Phyllis Coates as Kathy MacKenzie
- Fuzzy Knight as Tad Sloan
- Arthur Space as Austin
- Jack Ingram as MacKenzie
- Robert J. Wilke as Link
- Terry Frost as Alvord
- Robert Bray as Ed Murdock
- Denver Pyle as Carey
- Tim Ryan as Sam
- Florence Lake as Maggie
- Stanley Andrews as Judge Bruce
- Richard Reeves as Bartender
- Gene Roth as Blacksmith
- I. Stanford Jolley as Farmer
- House Peters Jr. as Bill Martin's Brother
- Buddy Roosevelt as Henchman

== Production ==
The film’s working title was Barbed Wire, although a different Western film with that title was also released in 1952.

Fargo was shot at the Iverson Ranch and its sets were designed by the art director Dave Milton.

== Release ==
The film premiered as a second feature to One Minute to Zero in Los Angeles on September 3, 1952.

== Reception ==
In the New York Daily News, critic Dorothy Masters wrote: "Although the film sticks to the traditional format in charging a few renegades with promoting the reign of terror, 'Fargo' is a notch above most of its kind. Along with the inevitable fights and bullets there has been an attempt to get some human interest into the movie and some histrionics from its players."

== Bibliography ==
- Blottner, Gene. Wild Bill Elliott: A Complete Filmography. McFarland, 2010.
- Martin, Len D. The Allied Artists Checklist: The Feature Films and Short Subjects of Allied Artists Pictures Corporation, 1947-1978. McFarland & Company, 1993.
