= Jack Baxley =

American actor (1884–1950)

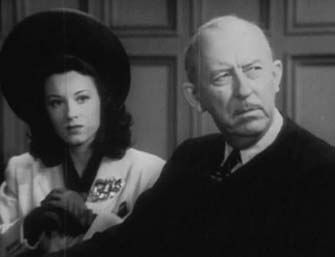
- Baxley with Lynn Starr in Gallant Lady (1942)
- Born: Andrew Jackson Baxley; July 4, 1884; Dallas, Texas, U.S.
- Died: December 10, 1950 (aged 66); Los Angeles, California, U.S.
- Occupation: Actor
- Years active: 1930–51

Andrew Jackson Baxley (July 4, 1884 – December 10, 1950) was an American character actor of the 1930s and 1940s. He appeared in over 100 films over his career, many in unnamed, un-credited roles. Occasionally he would receive small, named roles, and rarely a featured role.

== Life and career ==
Born in Dallas, Texas, prior to becoming an actor Baxley worked in circuses and carnivals as a side-show barker.

He made his film debut at the age of 47 in the 1930 Greta Garbo classic, Anna Christie, as a barker at Coney Island. It would be a character he portrayed frequently in films. Some of his more prominent roles included: Mathews in International Crime (1938); Judge Culpepper in Mr. Celebrity (1941); Sheriff Verner in Gallant Lady (1942); and in the featured role of Bill White in The Kid from Gower Gulch (1949), in one of his final performances.

== Select filmography ==
(Per AFI database)

- Possessed (1931)
- Faithless (1932)
- Straight Is the Way (1934)
- Murder in the Private Car (1934) (uncredited)
- Good Dame (1934)
- Sadie McKee (1934)
- The Gay Bride (1934)
- Whirlpool (1934)
- Now I'll Tell (1934)
- Man on the Flying Trapeze (1935)
- Our Little Girl (1935)
- Baby Face Harrington (1935)
- O'Shaughnessy's Boy (1935)
- The Affair of Susan (1935)
- Carnival (1935)
- Poppy (1936)
- Moonlight Murder (1936)
- San Francisco (1936)
- The Great Ziegfeld (1936)
- Man of the People (1937)
- Wells Fargo (1937)
- Murder Goes to College (1937)
- Merry-Go-Round of 1938 (1937)
- My Dear Miss Aldrich (1937)
- Love Is News (1937)
- Woman Chases Man (1937)
- You're Only Young Once (1937)
- Double Wedding (1937)
- Rascals (1938)
- Spring Madness (1938)
- International Crime (1938)
- Slightly Honorable (1939)
- Zenobia (1939)
- The Arizona Wildcat (1939)
- Stronger Than Desire (1939)
- The Gracie Allen Murder Case (1939)
- Young Tom Edison (1940)
- When the Daltons Rode (1940)
- Strike Up the Band (1940)
- Mr. Celebrity (1941)
- Lucky Jordan (1942)
- City of Silent Men (1942)
- Gallant Lady (1942)
- The Magnificent Ambersons (1942)
- Mrs. Wiggs of the Cabbage Patch (1942)
- This Gun for Hire (1942)
- A Tornado in the Saddle (1942)
- True to Life (1943)
- My Buddy (1944)
- Rationing (1944)
- Sweethearts of the U.S.A. (1944)
- And the Angels Sing (1944)
- Wilson (1944)
- Along Came Jones (1945)
- Don Juan Quilligan (1945)
- Riders of the Dawn (1945)
- Thrill of a Romance (1945)
- Canyon Passage (1946)
- Song of the Sierras (1946)
- California (1947)
- Desperate (1947)
- The Egg and I (1947)
- Framed (1947)
- The Last Round-Up (1947)
- Out of the Blue (1947)
- Rainbow Over the Rockies (1947)
- The Sea of Grass (1947)
- High Wall (1948)
- The Lady from Shanghai (1948)
- Summer Holiday (1948)
- Two Guys from Texas (1948)
- The Kid from Gower Gulch (1949)
- Battling Marshal (1950) (as A. J. Baxley)
