= Trails End =

1949 western film

- Directed by: Lambert Hillyer
- Written by: J. Benton Cheney
- Produced by: Barney A. Sarecky
- Starring: Johnny Mack Brown; Max Terhune; Kay Morley
- Cinematography: Harry Neumann
- Edited by: John C. Fuller
- Music by: Edward J. Kay
- Production company: Monogram Pictures
- Distributed by: Monogram Pictures
- Release date: April 3, 1949
- Running time: 57 minutes
- Country: United States
- Language: English

Trails End is a 1949 American Western film directed by Lambert Hillyer and starring Johnny Mack Brown, Max Terhune and Kay Morley.

== Cast ==
- Johnny Mack Brown as Johnny Mack
- Max Terhune as Alibi
- Kay Morley as Laurie Stuart
- Douglas Evans as Mel Porter
- Zon Murray as Clem Kettering
- Myron Healey as Drake
- Keith Richards as Bill Cameron
- George Chesebro as Joe Stuart
- William Bailey as Sheriff
- Carol Henry as Rocky
- Boyd Stockman as Henchman
- Eddie Majors as Luke

== Bibliography ==
- Pitts, Michael R. Western Movies: A Guide to 5,105 Feature Films. McFarland, 2012.
