= I'm from Arkansas =

1944 film by Lew Landers

- Directed by: Lew Landers
- Written by: Marcy Klauber (screenplay); Joseph Carole (screenplay)
- Produced by: E.H. Kleinert; Irving Vershel
- Starring: See below
- Cinematography: Robert Pittack
- Edited by: John F. Link Sr.
- Music by: Clarence Wheeler
- Distributed by: Producers Releasing Corporation
- Release date: 31 October 1944
- Running time: 70 minutes
- Country: United States
- Language: English

I'm from Arkansas is a 1944 American musical comedy film directed by Lew Landers.

== Plot summary ==
The town of Pitchfork, Arkansas makes national headlines when Esmeralda the sow gives birth to 18 piglets. Among the visitors to Pitchfork are a troupe of showgirls hoping to entertain the visitors and a folk music group returning to their home after their touring is through. In addition to the artists a meat packing company sends two men to investigate what made Esmeralda give birth to so many piglets and to bring the secret back to increase meat production.

== Cast ==
- Slim Summerville as Juniper Jenkins aka Pa
- El Brendel as Oly
- Iris Adrian as Doris
- Bruce Bennett as Bob Hamline
- Maude Eburne as Matilda Alden Jenkins aka Ma
- Cliff Nazarro as Willie Childs
- Al St. John as Farmer
- Carolina Cotton as Abigail 'Abby' Alden
- Danny Jackson as Efus Jenkins
- Paul Newlan as Stowe Packing Company Representative
- Harry Harvey as Stowe Packing Company Representative
- Arthur Q. Bryan as Commissioner of Agriculture
- John Hamilton as Harry Cashin, Vice President of Slowe Packing Company
- Douglas Wood as Governor of Arkansas
- Walter Baldwin as Packing Company Attorney
- Flo Bert as Showgirl
- The Pied Pipers as Quartet
- The Sunshine Girls (including Mary Ford) as Girl Trio
- Jimmy Wakely as Jimmy Wakely

== Soundtrack ==
- The Pied Pipers – "You're the Hit of the Season"
- Jimmy Wakely and The Sunshine Girls – "You Are My Sunshine" (Written by Jimmie Davis and Charles Mitchell)
- Jimmy Wakely – "Don't Turn Me Down Little Darlin'"
- Jimmy Wakely and The Sunshine Girls – "Whistlin' (Walkin') Down the Lane with You" (Written by Jimmy Wakely and Oliver Drake)
- Carolina Cotton – "I Love to Yodel" (Written by Carolina Cotton), "Yodel Mountain"
- The Pied Pipers – "Stay Away from My Heart" (Written by Jimmy Wakely)
- The Milo Twins – "Pass the Biscuits, Mirandy"
- The Pied Pipers – "If You Can't Go Right, Don't Go Wrong"
- The Milo Twins – "Pitchfork Polka"
