= Rainbow Over the Rockies =

1947 film directed by Oliver Drake

- Theatrical release poster
- Directed by: Oliver Drake
- Screenplay by: Elmer Clifton
- Story by: Oliver Drake
- Produced by: Oliver Drake
- Starring: Jimmy Wakely; Lee White; Dennis Moore; Pat Starling; Jack Baxley; Budd Buster
- Cinematography: Marcel Le Picard
- Edited by: Ralph Dixon
- Music by: Frank Sanucci
- Production company: Monogram Pictures
- Distributed by: Monogram Pictures
- Release date: February 8, 1947
- Running time: 54 minutes
- Country: United States
- Language: English

Rainbow Over the Rockies is a 1947 American Western film directed by Oliver Drake and written by Elmer Clifton. The film stars Jimmy Wakely, Lee White, Dennis Moore, Pat Starling, Jack Baxley and Budd Buster. The film was released on February 8, 1947 by Monogram Pictures.

== Cast ==
- Jimmy Wakely as Jimmy Wakely
- Lee White as 'Lasses' White
- Dennis Moore as Bill Miller
- Pat Starling as Ellen Miller
- Jack Baxley as Charles Miller
- Budd Buster as Frank Porter
- Zon Murray as Dave Warren
- Billy Dix as Henchman Nord
- Jasper Palmer as Sheriff George Perry
- Carl Sepulveda as Slim
- Bob Gilbert as Cowhand Shorty
- Wesley Tuttle as Porter Cowhand
