= Prairie Express =

1947 American Western film by Lambert Hillyer

- Theatrical release poster
- Directed by: Lambert Hillyer
- Screenplay by: Anthony Coldeway; J. Benton Cheney
- Produced by: Barney Sarecky
- Starring: Johnny Mack Brown; Raymond Hatton; Virginia Belmont; Marshall Reed; William Ruhl; Robert Winkler
- Cinematography: William A. Sickner
- Edited by: Fred Maguire
- Production company: Monogram Pictures
- Distributed by: Monogram Pictures
- Release date: October 25, 1947
- Running time: 55 minutes
- Country: United States
- Language: English

Prairie Express is a 1947 American Western film directed by Lambert Hillyer and written by Anthony Coldeway and J. Benton Cheney. The film stars Johnny Mack Brown, Raymond Hatton, Virginia Belmont, Marshall Reed, William Ruhl and Robert Winkler. The film was released on October 25, 1947, by Monogram Pictures.

== Cast ==
- Johnny Mack Brown as Johnny Hudson
- Raymond Hatton as Faro Jenkins
- Virginia Belmont as Peggy Porter
- Marshall Reed as Burke
- William Ruhl as Gordon Gregg
- Robert Winkler as Dave Porter
- Frank LaRue as Jarrett
- Ted Adams as Lem
- Steve Darrell as Sheriff Bill
- Craig Duncan as Pete
- Gary Garrett as Kent
- Hank Worden as Deputy Clint
- Bob McElroy as Joe
- Carl Mathews as Collins
- Boyd Stockman as Perry
- Curley Gibson as Ed
