= Ewing Miles Brown =

American actor

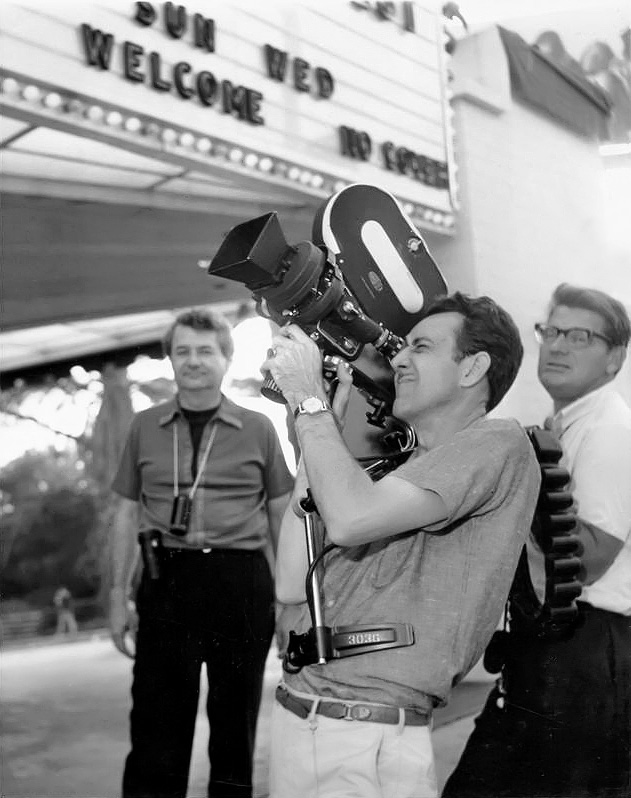
- Occupations: Actor, Producer, Director
- Years active: 1946–2015

Ewing Miles Brown began his career as an actor in Hollywood. His first role was a small part in the comedy, Our Gang. In the early 1950s he decided to integrate the production domain. He was the head editor in Emperor films and was recruited by Robert L. Lippert studio to take responsibility for production.

Not happy working for others, he opened his own production company, Movie Tech Studio. Meanwhile, he did not stop his activity as an actor and has contributed to several Hollywood films. He was often called by his nickname, "the Lucky Brown".

He died May 27, 2019, age 97.

== As an actor ==
Year	Film	Director	Stars
2008	Hollywood Confidential	Ken Osborn	Vernon Wells, Joe Estevez, James MacPherson
2002	The Stoneman	Ewing Miles Brown	Pat Morita, Christopher Atkins, Robin Riker
2000	The Thundering 8th	Donald Borza	Donald Borza, Ewing Miles Brown, Bo Hopkins
1993	Die Watching	Charles Davis	Christopher Atkins, Vali Ashton, Mike Jacobs Jr
1992	Shadow of the Dragon	Jimmy Williams	Robert Z'Dar, Sandy Palm, Donna Cherry
1990	A Shattered Dream	Robert Iscove	Ashley Allyn, Edward Blackoff, Ewing Miles Brown
1961	The Fantom	Harold Daniels	Roger Creed, Paulette Goddard, Lon Chaney Jr
1958	Giant from the Unknown	Richard E.Cunha	Ed Kemmer, Sally Fraser, Bob Steele
1957	The Astounding-She-Monster	Ronald V.Ashcroft	Robert Clarke, Kenne Duncan, Marilyn Harvey
1956	Walk the Dark Street	Wyott Ordung	Chuck Connors, Don Ross, Regina Gleason
1950	Red Rock Outlaw	Lucky Brown	Bob Gilbert, Ione Nixon and Forrest Matthews

== As a producer ==
Title	Role	Year
The Ruining	Executive Producer	2004
Dismembered	Producer as Ewing M.Brown	2003
The Stoneman	Producer as Ewing M.Brown	2002
A Whale of a Tale	Producer	1977
Horror of the Blood Monsters	Associate Producer as Ewing Brown	1970
Blood of Dracula's Castle	Associate Producer	1969
Hells Chosen Few	Associate Producer as Ewing Brown	1968
