= Texas Lawmen =

1951 film by Lewis D. Collins

- Directed by: Lewis D. Collins
- Written by: Joseph F. Poland; Myron Healey
- Produced by: Vincent M. Fennelly
- Starring: Johnny Mack Brown; James Ellison; I. Stanford Jolley
- Cinematography: Ernest Miller
- Edited by: Sam Fields
- Music by: Raoul Kraushaar
- Production company: Frontier Pictures
- Distributed by: Monogram Pictures
- Release date: December 2, 1951
- Running time: 54 minutes
- Country: United States
- Language: English

Texas Lawmen is a 1951 American Western film directed by Lewis D. Collins and starring Johnny Mack Brown, James Ellison and I. Stanford Jolley.

The film's sets were designed by the art directors Dave Milton and Vin Taylor.

== Cast ==
- Johnny Mack Brown as Marshal Johnny Mack Brown
- James Ellison as Sheriff Tod Merrick
- I. Stanford Jolley as Bart Morrow
- Lee Roberts as Steve Morrow
- Terry Frost as Henchman Ed Mason
- Marshall Reed as U. S. Marshal Potter
- Roy Bucko as Townsman
- Roy Butler as Stage Agent
- Cecil Combs as Townsman
- John Hart as Marshal Dave
- Al Haskell as Townsman
- Jack Hendricks as Pete
- Pierce Lyden as Sheriff Thorne
- Post Park as 1st Stage Driver
- Stanley Price as Mine Foreman
- Lyle Talbot as Dr. Riley
