= Range Land =

- Theatrical release poster
- Directed by: Lambert Hillyer
- Screenplay by: Adele Buffington
- Produced by: Eddie Davis
- Starring: Whip Wilson; Andy Clyde; Reno Browne; Leonard Penn; Reed Howes; Kenne Duncan
- Cinematography: Harry Neumann
- Edited by: John C. Fuller
- Production company: Monogram Pictures
- Distributed by: Monogram Pictures
- Release date: December 24, 1949
- Running time: 56 minutes
- Country: United States
- Language: English

Range Land is a 1949 American Western film directed by Lambert Hillyer and written by Adele Buffington. The film stars Whip Wilson, Andy Clyde, Reno Browne, Leonard Penn, Reed Howes and Kenne Duncan. The film was released on December 24, 1949, by Monogram Pictures.

== Cast ==
- Whip Wilson as Whip Wilson
- Andy Clyde as Winks Grayson
- Reno Browne as Doris Allen
- Leonard Penn as Bart Sheldon
- Reed Howes as Red Davis
- Kenne Duncan as Sheriff Winters
- Steve Clark as Ben Allen
- Kermit Maynard as Shad Cook
- Stanley Blystone as Matt Mosely
- John Cason as Rocky Rand
- Billy Griffith as Prof. Ambrose
- Michael Dugan as Guard
- Carol Henry as Joe Evans
