= Raiders of the South =

1947 film directed by Lambert Hillyer

- Theatrical release poster
- Directed by: Lambert Hillyer
- Screenplay by: J. Benton Cheney
- Produced by: Scott R. Dunlap
- Starring: Johnny Mack Brown; Evelyn Brent; Raymond Hatton; Reno Browne; Marshall Reed; John Hamilton
- Cinematography: Harry Neumann
- Edited by: Roy Livingston
- Production company: Monogram Pictures
- Distributed by: Monogram Pictures
- Release date: January 18, 1947
- Running time: 55 minutes
- Country: United States
- Language: English

Raiders of the South is a 1947 American Western film directed by Lambert Hillyer and written by J. Benton Cheney. The film stars Johnny Mack Brown, Evelyn Brent, Raymond Hatton, Reno Browne, Marshall Reed and John Hamilton. The film was released on January 18, 1947, by Monogram Pictures.

== Cast ==
- Johnny Mack Brown as Captain Johnny Brownell
- Evelyn Brent as Belle Chambers
- Raymond Hatton as Shorty Kendall
- Reno Browne as Lynne Chambers
- Marshall Reed as Larry Mason
- John Hamilton as George Boone
- John Merton as Preston Durant
- Eddie Parker as Jeb Warren
- Frank LaRue as Judge Fry
- Ted Adams as Prosecuting Attorney
- Pierce Lyden as Marshal Michael Farley
- Cactus Mack as Pete
