= Silver Trails =

1948 film directed by Christy Cabanne

- Directed by: Christy Cabanne
- Written by: J. Benton Cheney
- Produced by: Louis Gray
- Starring: Jimmy Wakely; Dub Taylor; Christine Larson
- Cinematography: Harry Neumann
- Edited by: John C. Fuller
- Music by: Edward J. Kay
- Production company: Monogram Productions
- Release date: August 28, 1948 (US)
- Running time: 53 minutes
- Country: United States
- Language: English

Silver Trails is a 1948 American Western film, directed by Christy Cabanne. It stars Jimmy Wakely, Dub Taylor, and Christine Larson, and was released on August 28, 1948. The film starred Whip Wilson (uncredited as the sheriff), who later went on to have a career as a famous Western film star.

== Cast ==
- Jimmy Wakely as Jimmy Wakely
- Dub Taylor as Cannonball (credited as "Cannonball" Taylor)
- Christine Larson as Diane Chambers
- George Lewis as José
- George Meeker as Willard Jackson
- Pierce Lyden as Ramsay
- William Norton Bailey as John Chambers
- Connie Asins as Conchita
- Fred L. Edwards as Sturgis
- Robert Strange as Don Esteban
- Whip Wilson (uncredited) as sheriff
