= Saga of Death Valley =

1939 film

- Directed by: Joseph Kane
- Written by: Karen DeWolf; Stuart Anthony
- Produced by: Joseph Kane
- Starring: Roy Rogers
- Cinematography: Jack A. Marta
- Release date: 1939
- Running time: 58 minutes
- Country: United States
- Language: English

Saga of Death Valley is a 1939 American Western film directed by Joseph Kane and starring Roy Rogers.

== Plot ==
When the senior Roy Rogers is gunned down in front of little Tim Rogers, he is taken by the killers, leaving his older brother Roy Jr. behind and alone. Tim is raised by his father's killers and called Jerry. Fifteen years later, Roy tracks down his father's killers to bring them to justice using an alias to disguise his motives. But he finds that his little brother is a leading henchman for the killers' gang.

== Cast ==
- Roy Rogers as Roy Rogers
- George "Gabby" Hayes as Gabby Whittaker
- Doris Day as Ann Meredith
- Donald Barry as Jerry aka Tim Rogers
- Frank M. Thomas as Ed Tasker

== Production ==
Saga of Death Valley was Roy Rogers 12th Western film in a starring role. Filmed in scenic Lone Pine near the actual Death Valley. Donald Barry would, in the next year—1940—find Western film stardom in his own right after starring in the 12-chapter serial The Adventures of Red Ryder. It was for this star-making role that he became known as Don "Red" Barry for the rest of his film career. Western singing star Jimmy Wakely appears here in his first film role. He, too, would later star in his own series of Western films, following in Roy Rogers' footsteps as a singing cowboy hero. Doris Day (1910–1998), who played Ann Meredith, was a namesake of the famous Doris Day (1922–2019).
