= Beauties on Motor Scooters =

- Directed by: Carlo Campogalliani
- Written by: Mario Amendola; Leonardo Benvenuti; Carlo Campogalliani; Piero Regnoli
- Starring: Isa Barzizza; Virginia Belmont; Fulvia Franco
- Cinematography: Romolo Garroni
- Edited by: Dolores Tamburini
- Music by: Corrado Pintaldi
- Production company: S.A.F.A.
- Release date: 1952
- Running time: 101 minutes
- Country: Italy
- Language: Italian

Beauties on Motor Scooters (Italian: Bellezze in moto-scooter) is a 1952 Italian comedy film by Carlo Campogalliani and starring Isa Barzizza, Virginia Belmont and Fulvia Franco.

== Partial cast ==
- Isa Barzizza as Laura
- Virginia Belmont as Enrichetta
- Fulvia Franco as Marcella
- Carlo Giustini as Alberto
- Enrico Viarisio as Carletti
- Linda Sini as Franca
- Guglielmo Inglese as Pelacardi
- Galeazzo Benti as Gastone
- Riccardo Billi
- Tony Amendola
- Maria Fiore
- Maurizio Arena
- Mario Riva
- Tazio Nuvolari
- Virgilio Riento
- Renato Malavasi
- Enrico Luzi

== Bibliography ==
- Daniela Treveri Gennari. Post-War Italian Cinema: American Intervention, Vatican Interests. Routledge, 2011.
