= Christine Larson =

American actress (1925–1973)

- Born: Marjorie Goss; 1925; Durand, Wisconsin, United States
- Died: 1973 (aged 47)
- Occupation: Actress
- Years active: 1948-1958 (film & TV)

Christine Larson (born Marjorie Goss; 1925–1973) was an American film and television actress. From 1948 to 1953 she played the female lead in a number of films produced by Monogram and Columbia Pictures, gradually transitioning into television. She particularly appeared in western films. She was sometimes credited as Christine Larsen.

== Early years ==
Larson, born Marjorie Goss in Durand, Wisconsin, was the daughter of Galen Goss. Larson shared her father's interest in horses, winning ribbons and trophies for "her excellence as a horsewoman." As a student at Durand High School, she focused on commercial art and organized the school's first drama club. She wrote and starred in plays there.

Larson acted in little theatres in her home state. After her father's death, she and her mother moved to Beverly Hills, California, after Larson finished high school. She attended the Art Center School in Los Angeles, the University of California at Los Angeles, and the Los Angeles School of Design.

== Career ==
In California she designed greeting cards and first worked in the film industry as a designer of men's costumes, including those for the films The Dolly Sisters, Dragonwyck, and State Fair, This costume design work was carried out first for the Western Costume Company in Los Angeles, and subsequently at 20th Century Fox, where Larson headed the men's period design department. Hoping to become an actress, she moved to New York, where she worked as a commercial artist and studied acting at the American Academy of Dramatic Arts. She moved back to California and began to work in television and eventually in films. Winning a Los Angeles television contest "over a large and accomplished field of actresses" gave Larson the opportunity to act in motion pictures.

== Personal life ==
Larson married John Frederick Cook on August 12, 1956, in Beverly Hills, California. He was an engineer with Pacific Telephone Company.

== Selected filmography ==
- Hidden Danger (1948)
- Silver Trails (1948)
- Partners of the Sunset (1948)
- Outlaw Brand (1948)
- Devil's Cargo (1948)
- The Fighting Ranger (1948)
- Belle Starr's Daughter (1948)
- Crashing Thru (1949)
- Trial Without Jury (1950)
- Valley of Fire (1951)
- The Well (1951)
- Brave Warrior (1952)
- Last Train from Bombay (1952)
- Valley of the Head Hunters (1953)

== Bibliography ==
- Pitts, Michael R. Western Movies: A Guide to 5,105 Feature Films. McFarland, 2012.
