= Murder in the Private Car =

1934 film by Harry Beaumont

- Directed by: Harry Beaumont
- Written by: Harvey F. Thew (adaptation)
- Screenplay by: Ralph Spence; Edgar Allan Woolf; Al Boasberg
- Based on: The Rear Car; 1922 play by Edward E. Rose
- Produced by: Lucien Hubbard
- Starring: Charles Ruggles; Una Merkel; Mary Carlisle
- Cinematography: Leonard Smith; James Van Trees
- Edited by: William S. Gray
- Production company: Metro-Goldwyn-Mayer
- Distributed by: Loew's, Inc.
- Release date: June 29, 1934 (United States)
- Running time: 63 minutes
- Country: United States
- Language: English

Murder in the Private Car is a 1934 American pre-Code mystery romance film starring Mary Carlisle, Charles Ruggles and Una Merkel. Directed by Harry Beaumont, the production is based on the play The Rear Car by Edward E. Rose. David Townsend was the film's art director.

MGM had previously filmed it in the silent era as Red Lights (1923), starring Raymond Griffith.

== Plot ==
This is the story of Los Angeles switchboard operator Ruth Raymond. She learns from lawyer Alden Murray that she is actually the daughter of railroad tycoon Luke Carson. She had been kidnapped as a baby by Luke's brother and partner Elwood, and placed with strangers. Once it is found out that she is an heiress, there is an attempt on her life by her bodyguard and chauffeur, which is foiled by Godfrey Scott.

A telegram from her father is intercepted and replaced, telling her to meet him in New York instead of Los Angeles, and that a private train car has been arranged. Ruth, Murray, and her best friend Georgia Latham board the train bound for New York. In the private car, the lights go out and an announcement is heard, "Eight hours to live", after which Scott introduces himself to Ruth and her friends as a sleuth who prevents crime. Scott reunites Ruth with her boyfriend John Blake, who has stowed away. Then the train is suddenly stopped until the wreck of a circus train on the tracks is cleared.

Murray is murdered and "Five hours to live" is announced. Then an escaped circus gorilla attacks Ruth, Georgia, and Scott before jumping from the train to its death. The next morning, the train stops in the same small town where Luke Carson's train has also stopped. He has been tipped off by a mysterious voice transmission to meet her. Now with no reason to go to Los Angeles, her father joins Ruth's party in the private car, dismissing the danger, refusing to believe George when he says that Murray was stabbed through the eye.

Suddenly, all the windows and doors are blocked with metal panels and the lights put out, and a voice informs the passengers that the private car is about to be uncoupled from the train and will roll backwards downhill towards another train, the Limited. A secret panel opens, revealing concealed explosives that will make sure no one survives the crash.

Luke Carson recognizes the sinister voice as that of his brother, Elwood, who confirms his identity and says Luke once cheated him. Elwood uncouples the car and gasps. Scott has shot him. The dead body confirms his identity and reveals that he is the conductor in charge of the private car. Carson found Elwood's control center, and now he opens the shutters and uses a radio transmitter to broadcast a warning of the imminent collision and explosion. The Limited's engineers reverse their train, but this also risks a collision since a freight train is following it.

A harrowing 10-minute segment ensues, cutting from the point of view of the passengers back and forth to the railway men frantically throwing switches and a series of harrowing near misses as they careen through a railway yard. The Limited, the freight, and the runaway private car end on three separate tracks, but the private car is still plummeting downhill. Then they dispatch a locomotive to catch up with the runaway car, warning its engineer about the explosives. The near-misses continue as railway men risk their lives to keep the car on track. The engine looms over the car. The engineer manages to pull so close that—one by one—everyone can jump onto the small front platform of his steam locomotive.

He stops, just before the runaway car derails on a curve and explodes. When everyone gets off to look, a blast of steam sends Scott and Georgia into each other's arms. When the steam finally clears, they dreamily exclaim “beautiful!” and skip off hand in hand.

== Cast ==
- Charles Ruggles as Godfrey D. Scott
- Una Merkel as Georgia Latham
- Mary Carlisle as Ruth Raymond (aka Ruth Carson)
- Russell Hardie as John Blake
- Porter Hall as Alden Murray
- Willard Robertson as Hanks - Car Conductor
- Berton Churchill as Luke Carson
- Cliff Thompson as Mr. Allen
- Snowflake as Titus - Car Porter
- Harry Semels as Evil Eye (scenes deleted)

Uncredited cast

- Ernie Adams as Taxi Driver
- Hooper Atchley as Conductor on Eastbound Train
- Jack Baxley as Conductor in Holton
- Walter Brennan as Switchman
- Raymond Brown as Bertillion Man
- James P. Burtis as Switchman
- Jack Cheatham as Foreman
- Ray Corrigan as Naba the Gorilla
- Sterling Holloway as Office Boy
- Olaf Hytten as Man Asking About Radio
- Wilfred Lucas as Train Conductor Thrown from Train
- Matt McHugh as Policeman Stopping John
- G. Raymond Nye as Detective
- Lee Phelps as Policeman Carrying Ruth

== Production ==
Exterior railroad scenes were filmed on the Southern Pacific Railroad at Dunsmuir and locations northward. ..

== Censorship ==
Before Murder in the Private Car could be exhibited in Kansas, the Kansas Board of Review required the removal of a "lewd picture of a woman," a reference to prohibition, and Godfrey D. Scott saying that he could only control himself so long and Georgia Latham's reply.
