= Oklahoma Blues =

- Theatrical release poster
- Directed by: Lambert Hillyer
- Screenplay by: Bennett Cohen
- Produced by: Louis Gray
- Starring: Jimmy Wakely; Dub Taylor; Virginia Belmont; I. Stanford Jolley; Zon Murray; George J. Lewis
- Cinematography: Harry Neumann
- Edited by: Fred Maguire
- Production company: Monogram Pictures
- Distributed by: Monogram Pictures
- Release date: March 28, 1948
- Running time: 56 minutes
- Country: United States
- Language: English

Oklahoma Blues is a 1948 American Western film directed by Lambert Hillyer and written by Bennett Cohen. The film stars Jimmy Wakely, Dub Taylor, Virginia Belmont, I. Stanford Jolley, Zon Murray and George J. Lewis. The film was released on March 28, 1948, by Monogram Pictures.

== Plot ==
After State Commissioner Walton tells Sheriff Sam Oldring that he thinks the town of Rainbow's End could become the new county seat, the stagecoach in which they are riding is held up by four gunmen, one of whom slugs Oldring with his revolver. When the stage reaches Rainbow's End, Walton tells Judge Emerson that, due to the holdup and general lawlessness, he no longer considers the town suitable for the county seat although the townspeople have raised over $40,000 to build a courthouse.

When "Cannonball" discovers that the town is in trouble, he tells the citizens that another notorious outlaw, "The Melody Kid," is coming to town. The Melody Kid is really Cannonball's friend Jimmy Wakely, a law-abiding cowboy, but Cannonball believes that having Jimmy pose as an outlaw will somehow enhance his reputation. Jimmy tangles with gunman Slip Drago in a restaurant run by Judy Joyce and later visits his old friend, Oldring. The ailing Oldring is packing to leave, having failed to capture the gang of gunslingers responsible for the town's misfortunes. Unknown to Oldring, Beasley, the local undertaker, is the leader of the gang and is attempting to have Yuba Junction, where he owns a lot of land, named the county seat.

After Slip reports to Beasley about his run-in with The Melody Kid, the gang goes after Jimmy, but he and Cannonball drive them off and kill two of them. Walton states that Rainbow's End could still be in the running if it can eliminate the lawlessness, and Judge Emerson suggests hiring The Melody Kid to clean up the town. Jimmy agrees to take the job until Oldring gets better and insists that Judy not sell her business as he likes "home cooking." Later, when Jimmy is about to take the town's funds to Capital City to turn them over to the commissioner, Beasley has him arrested on murder and robbery charges by a phony sheriff. However, with Cannonball's help, Jimmy escapes and later, because he feels he can trust no one, takes the money at gunpoint from Beasley and Emerson just before Drago and his brother ride up to stage a holdup.

The gang rides after Jimmy and takes him prisoner, but not before he conceals the money under his saddle. Back in town, Oldring informs Emerson and Beasley that Cannonball invented The Melody Kid so that Jimmy might infiltrate the gang and tells them that Jimmy had doubtless taken the money directly to Walton. When Emerson phones to confirm this, he is told that Jimmy has not delivered the cash.

Meanwhile, the Dragos try to force Jimmy to tell them where the money is. Cannonball and Oldring tail the fake sheriff to where Jimmy is being held and, in a shootout, rescue him and capture Beasley and his gang. When Jimmy leaves to take the money to the commissioner, Emerson and Judy ask him to return to Rainbow's End, but he and Cannonball plan to resume their wandering.

== Cast ==
- Jimmy Wakely as Jimmy Wakely
- Dub Taylor as Cannonball Taylor
- Virginia Belmont as Judy Joyce
- I. Stanford Jolley as Beasley
- Zon Murray as Matt Drago
- George J. Lewis as Slip Drago
- Steve Clark as Sheriff Sam Oldring
- Frank LaRue as Judge Emerson
- J.C. Lytton as Walton
- Milburn Morante as Amos
- Charles King as Gabe
- Bob Woodward as Bob
