= Crossed Trails =

1948 film by Lambert Hillyer

- Theatrical release poster
- Directed by: Lambert Hillyer
- Screenplay by: Adele Buffington
- Produced by: Louis Gray
- Starring: Johnny Mack Brown; Raymond Hatton; Lynne Carver; Douglas Evans; Kathy Frye; Zon Murray
- Cinematography: Harry Neumann
- Edited by: Fred Maguire
- Music by: Edward J. Kay
- Production company: Monogram Pictures
- Distributed by: Monogram Pictures
- Release date: April 11, 1948
- Running time: 53 minutes
- Country: United States
- Language: English

Crossed Trails is a 1948 American Western film directed by Lambert Hillyer and written by Adele Buffington. The film stars Johnny Mack Brown, Raymond Hatton, Lynne Carver, Douglas Evans, Kathy Frye, and Zon Murray. The film was released on April 11, 1948 by Monogram Pictures.

== Cast ==
- Johnny Mack Brown as Johnny Mack
- Raymond Hatton as Bodie Clark
- Lynne Carver as Maggie Flynn
- Douglas Evans as Jim Hudson
- Kathy Frye as Melissa Hendrix
- Zon Murray as Curtin
- Mary MacLaren as Mrs. Laswell
- Ted Adams as Bill Laswell
- Steve Clark as Blake
- Frank LaRue as Judge
- Milburn Morante as Steve Anderson
- Bob Woodward as Wright
- Pierce Lyden as Whitfield
- Henry Hall as Stoddard
- Hugh Murray as Jury Foreman
- Bud Osborne as Sheriff
