= Cowboy Cavalier =

1948 American western film

- Theatrical release poster
- Directed by: Derwin Abrahams
- Screenplay by: Ronald Davidson; J. Benton Cheney
- Produced by: Louis Gray
- Starring: Jimmy Wakely; Dub Taylor; Jan Bryant; Douglas Evans; Claire Whitney; William Ruhl
- Cinematography: Harry Neumann
- Edited by: Carl Pierson
- Production company: Monogram Pictures
- Distributed by: Monogram Pictures
- Release date: July 11, 1948
- Running time: 57 minutes
- Country: United States
- Language: English

Cowboy Cavalier is a 1948 American Western film directed by Derwin Abrahams and written by Ronald Davidson and J. Benton Cheney. The film stars Jimmy Wakely, Dub Taylor, Jan Bryant, Douglas Evans, Claire Whitney and William Ruhl. The film was released on July 11, 1948, by Monogram Pictures.

== Plot ==
In the Old West, Mary Croft operates a stage line with the help of her foreman, Jimmy Wakely and his pal, Cannonball. Mary's daughter, Pat, returns to town with newcomer, Lance Regan, to whom she is attracted. Lance tells Mary he was recently a prison guard where he met her friend, Pat Collins, an inmate, who referred him to her for a job. Mary hires Regan as a guard. It is revealed that Regan's actual purpose is to use his job as insider to coordinate stage robberies with his gang. Regan purposefully deserts an ambush forcing Jimmy and Cannonball to chase off the robbers by themselves. Jimmy tells Mary to fire Regan for his desertion, but Regan convinces her otherwise.

Jimmy suspects Mary's refusal to fire Regan suggests he is blackmailing her, and he visits Collins on a prison work crew. Collins reveals that he and Mary were once married and that Pat is their daughter. Collins disclosed that to Regan, who was a fellow prisoner, and now Reagan is using the story to blackmail Mary who does not want others to know of her relationship to Collins.

Regan kills Pete Morris and steals his gold mine claim papers after he overhears Pete tell Mary of his good fortune. Regan's next move is to steal a gold bullion shipment deposited in the Croft's safe. Collins breaks out of prison and tries to stop Regan, but is subdued and forced by Regan and his gang to open the office safe containing the bullion. Jimmy intervenes, chasing the henchman from the Croft's office. With evidence mounting against him, Regan flees on a buckboard pursued by Jimmy. A gunfight ensues and the chase ends when Jimmy shoots Regan dead.

Pat leaves town on the next stage, and Jimmy rides off singing.

== Cast ==
- Jimmy Wakely as Jimmy Wakely
- Dub Taylor as Cannonball
- Jan Bryant as Pat Croft
- Douglas Evans as Lance Regan
- Claire Whitney as Mary Croft
- William Ruhl as Mason
- Steve Clark as Patrick Collins
- Milburn Morante as Pete Morris
- Bud Osborne as Joe
- Bob Woodward as Graves
- Carol Henry as Prison Guard
