= Gunslingers (1950 film) =

- Directed by: Wallace W. Fox
- Screenplay by: Adele Buffington
- Produced by: Wallace W. Fox
- Starring: Whip Wilson; Andy Clyde; Reno Browne
- Cinematography: Harry Neumann
- Edited by: John C. Fuller
- Music by: Edward J. Kay
- Production company: Monogram Pictures Corp.
- Release date: April 9, 1950 (US)
- Running time: 55 minutes
- Country: United States
- Language: English

Gunslingers is a 1950 American Western film written by Adele Buffington, directed by Wallace W. Fox and starring Whip Wilson, Andy Clyde and Reno Browne.

== Plot ==
Lawman Whip Wilson arrests Tim Cramer and his gang after they conduct a payroll robbery. As he talks to Tim, Whip learns that Tim turned to a life of crime after his father was recently accused of cattle rustling. Lou, Tim's father, was a blacksmith in Rockville, the local town. When he goes into town, he learns from "Rawhide" Rosie Rawlins that Tim's father, Lou, the local blacksmith, is currently under trial in the town's saloon for his alleged crime. After Lou is convicted for rustling and sentenced to death, Marshal Dean takes him out of the saloon and is leading him to the jail. Whip feels that something is off about the whole process, so he masks his face and confronts the marshal. When Dean goes for his gun, Whip draws faster and shoots the gun from his hand, allowing Lou to escape.

With a $1,000 price on his head, Lou hides out in a cabin outside of town. "Rawhide" Rosie goes to Whip and lets him know that she suspects Ace Larabee might have framed Lou for the rustling that was actually done by his own gang. To support her suspicions, she shows Whip a letter that which indicates that Larabee has procured the mortgages of all the local rancher's from the bank. Whip knows that the railroad has plans to build a line through the local area, which greatly enhances the values of the ranches. After Whip tells Winks, his sidekick, that he knows that Lou is hiding out in a nearby cabin, Jeff Nugent, the owner of the Lazy "C" Ranch, one of the local ranches acquired by Ace, confronts Ace and tells him and tells him he knows of his criminal record. Whip takes over the responsibilities of Lou's blacksmith shop, and tell Winks and Jeff that Ace and his henchman know about the impending rail line. As he is telling Winks, the Marshal and his henchmen break down the blacksmith shop door and begins to fire upon the men. Whip and Winks escape, but Jeff is killed. The marshall sets up Whip as the fall guy in Jeff's death.

During the gunfight, Whip has heard Ace call the marshal by the name Barton. He goes to the telegraph office and instructs the operator, Libby to notify the authorities in the county seat of this information. After she sends the message, she takes some food to Lou at the cabin. Unbeknownst to her, she is followed there by Steve, one of Ace's gang members. Whip arrives shortly thereafter, and arrests Steve, but is forced to release him when three more of Ace's henchmen arrive. The following day, the county seat replies to Whip's telegram, letting them know that Marshall Dean is an imposter, who is also known by the names Hank Babbit and Brad Barton.

Steve goes to Jeff's house, where he is in the process of planting evidence of rustling, in the form of two branding irons which Ace and his cohorts had used to re-brand the cattle they rustled. Whip captures him in the act and takes him to the saloon where Dean and his gang are. As he is telling Dean that he knows of Ace's plan to cash in on the local ranches now that the railroad is going to run a line in the area, a real deputy marshal, by the name of Stoner, arrives from the county seat and places Ace, Dean/Babbit/Barton and their gang under arrest. With all in order, Whip and Winks say goodbye to their friends and head on their way.

== Cast ==
- Whip Wilson as Whip Wilson
- Andy Clyde as Winks
- Reno Browne as Libby
- Sarah Padden as "Rawhide" Rosie Rawlins
- Bill Kennedy as Ace Larabee
- Dennis Moore as Marshal Dean, aka Hank Babbit and Brad Barton
- George Chesebro as Jeff Nugent
- Frank McCarroll as Parsons
- Steve Clark as Lou Cramer
- Carol Henry as Steve
- Riley Hill as Tim Cramer
- Reed Howes as Stoner
- George De Normand as Pete
- Hank Bell as Hollister
- Carl Mathews as Kerner

== Production ==
It was reported that the film would be one of several released by Monogram in April 1950. The National Legion of Decency assigned the film an A-I rating, meaning it was "Unobjectionable for General Patronage".
