= The Law Comes to Gunsight =

1947 film directed by Lambert Hillyer

- Directed by: Lambert Hillyer
- Written by: J. Benton Cheney
- Produced by: Barney A. Sarecky
- Starring: Johnny Mack Brown; Raymond Hatton; Reno Browne
- Cinematography: Harry Neumann
- Edited by: Fred Maguire
- Music by: Edward J. Kay
- Production company: Monogram Pictures
- Distributed by: Monogram Pictures
- Release date: May 24, 1947
- Running time: 56 minutes
- Country: United States
- Language: English

The Law Comes to Gunsight is a 1947 American Western film directed by Lambert Hillyer and starring Johnny Mack Brown, Raymond Hatton and Reno Browne.

== Cast ==
- Johnny Mack Brown as Johnny Macklin
- Raymond Hatton as Reno
- Reno Browne as Judy Hartley
- Lanny Rees as Bud Hartley
- William Ruhl as Brad Foster
- Zon Murray as Drago - Henchman
- Frank LaRue as Mayor Jim Blaine
- Ernie Adams as Bert Simpson
- Kermit Maynard as Jim - Blacksmith
- Ted Adams as Ben Prescott
- Gary Garrett as Blackie - Henchman
- Lee Roberts as Pecos
- Willard W. Willingham as Henchman

== Bibliography ==
- Martin, Len D. The Allied Artists Checklist: The Feature Films and Short Subjects of Allied Artists Pictures Corporation, 1947-1978. McFarland & Company, 1993.
