= Gallant Lady (1942 film) =

1942 film by William Beaudine

- Directed by: William Beaudine
- Written by: Octavus Roy Cohen, Arthur St. Claire
- Produced by: Lester Cutler, Sam Efrus, Leon Fromkess
- Cinematography: Marcel Le Picard
- Edited by: Frederick Bain
- Production companies: Motion Picture Associates, Inc
- Release date: May 29, 1942
- Country: United States
- Language: English

Gallant Lady is a 1942 American drama film directed by William Beaudine. It stars Rose Hobart, Sidney Blackmer, Claire Rochelle, and Lynn Starr.

== Cast ==
- Rose Hobart as Rosemary Walsh
- Sidney Blackmer as Steve Carey
- Claire Rochelle as Nellie
- Lynn Starr as Linda
- Jane Novak as Lucy Walker
- Vince Barnett as Baldy
- Jack Baxley as Sheriff Verner
- Crane Whitley as Pete Saunders
- John Ince as Judge Stevens
- Frank Brownlee as Luke Walker
- Richard Clarke as Nick Morelli
- Spec O'Donnell as Ben Walker
- Inez Cole as Jane
- Pat McKee as Jed Hicks
- Ruby Dandridge as Sarah
