= Across the Rio Grande (film) =

1949 film directed by Oliver Drake

- Theatrical release poster
- Directed by: Oliver Drake
- Written by: Ronald Davidson
- Produced by: Louis Gray
- Starring: Jimmy Wakely; Dub Taylor; Reno Browne
- Cinematography: Harry Neumann
- Edited by: John C. Fuller
- Music by: Edward J. Kay
- Production company: Monogram Productions
- Release date: May 15, 1949
- Running time: 56 minutes
- Country: United States
- Language: English

Across the Rio Grande is a 1949 American Western film directed by Oliver Drake and starring Jimmy Wakely, Dub Taylor, Reno Browne and Polly Bergen in her film debut. It was released on May 15, 1949.

== Plot ==
Steve and Sally Blaine are traveling by stagecoach to investigate the murder of their father. The stage is held up by outlaws who are held at bay by Sally's sharpshooting with a six gun. Steve, a lawyer, is too frightened to shoot a firearm following a childhood tragedy. The Blaines are joined by Jimmy and Cannonball, an aspiring detective, who help in solving the mystery and bringing the guilty to justice.

== Cast ==
- Jimmy Wakely as Jimmy Wakely
- Dub Taylor as Cannonball (credited as "Cannonball" Taylor)
- Reno Browne as Sally Blaine
- Riley Hill as Steven Blaine
- Dennis Moore as Carson
- Kenne Duncan as Joe Bardet
- Ted Adams as Tom Sloan
- Myron Healey as Stage Holdup Man
- Bud Osborne as Stage Driver
- Polly Bergen as Cantina Singer (as Polly Burgin)
- Bob Curtis as Gil (henchman)
- Carol Henry as Lewis (henchman)
- Boyd Stockman as Ed (henchman)
- William Bailey as Sheriff Reid

== Songs ==
- "Across the Rio Grande" – Written by Ray Whitley and Jimmy Wakely / Sung by Jimmy Wakely and Polly Bergen
- "I'm Lonely and Nobody Cares" – Written by Ray Whitley and Jimmy Wakely / Sung by Jimmy Wakely
