= Gallant Lady (yacht) =

Super yacht built in 2007

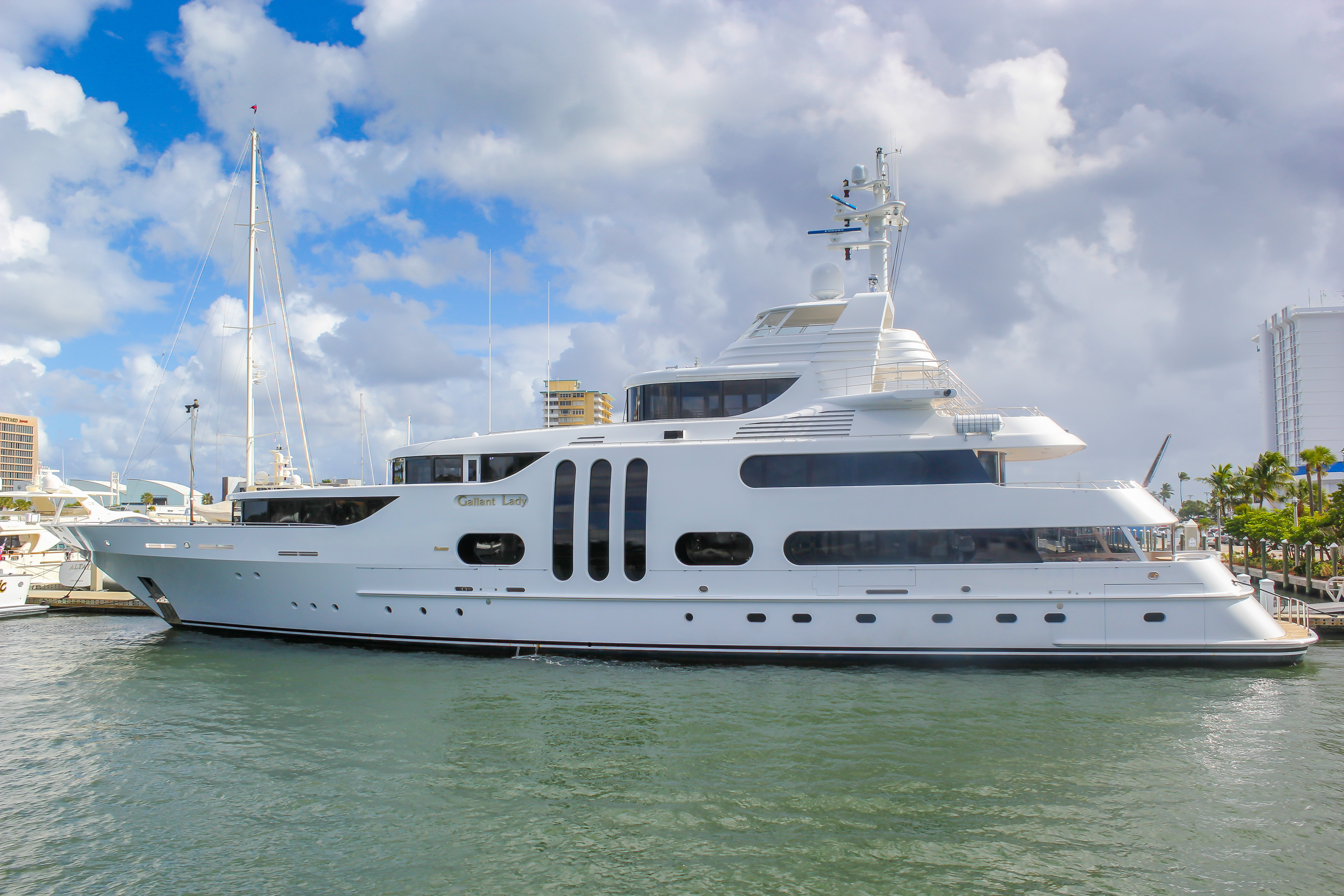
Gallant Lady - side view

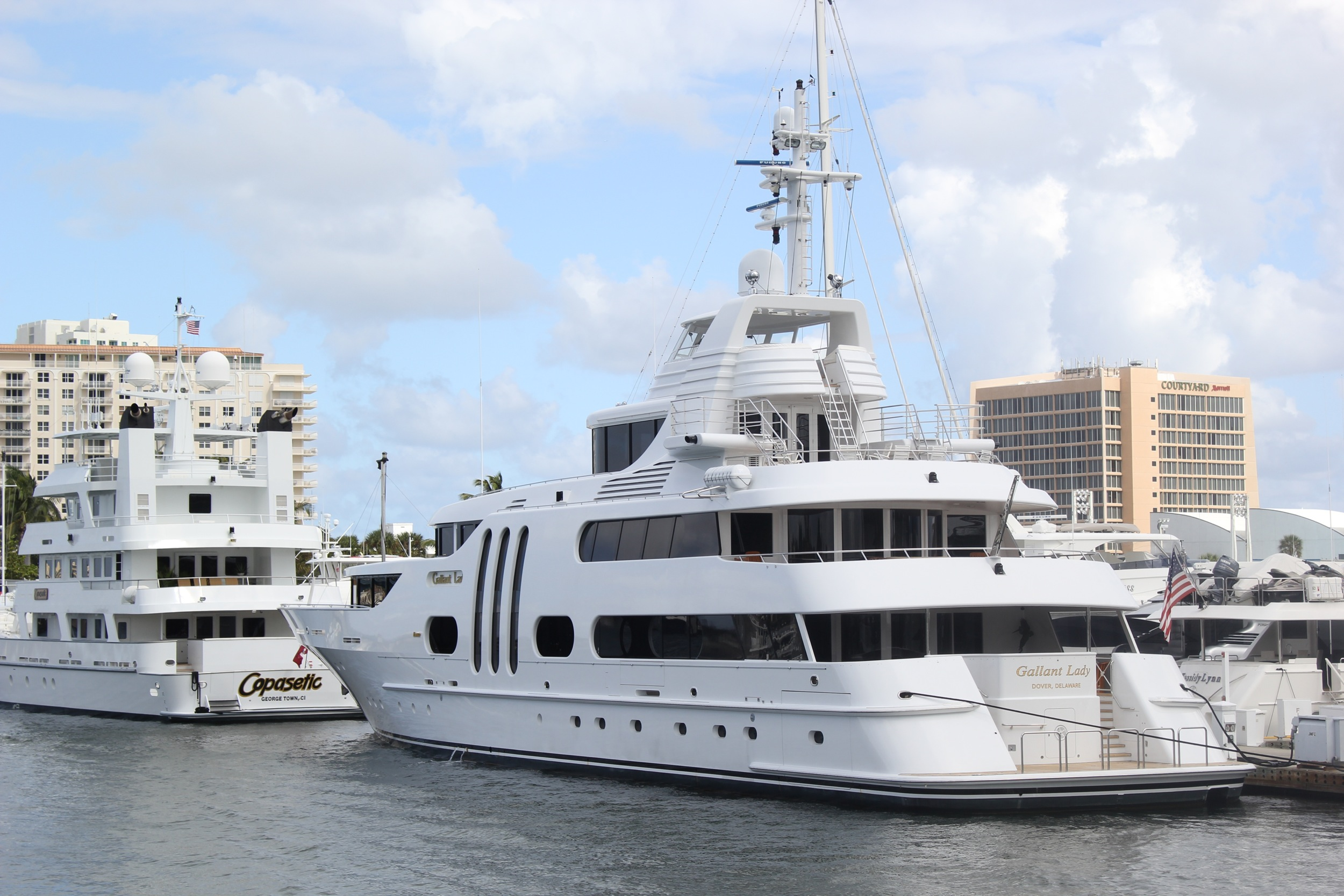
Gallant Lady - three quarter view

Gallant Lady is a super yacht, designed by De Voogt Naval Architects and built by Feadship for Jim Moran in 2007, shortly before his death. It measures 51.21 metres (168.0 ft) in length and has a crew of twelve and can accommodate ten guests. The yacht is registered in Dover, Delaware.

== Construction and design ==
It measures 51.21 metres (168.0 ft) in length with a gross tonnage of 765. The vessel has a beam of 9.6 metres (31 ft) and a draft of 2.15 metres (7 ft 1 in). The ship has six crew cabins to accommodate its twelve crew and five passenger cabins for ten guests.

The yacht's interior was designed by John Munford and features an exterior design by Richard Jorden. It is built from lightweight materials and is eco-friendly, and features interiors influenced by 18th and 19th century France and Italy, with woods including black walnut, sycamore, eucalyptus and myrtle burl. It also features a steel hull and aluminium superstructure. Gallant Lady has 4 teak decks.

The yacht is registered in Dover, Delaware.

The vessel is powered by two Caterpillar 3508B DITA engines, 1000HP each at 1600 RPM, giving it a top speed of 15 knots and a cruise speed of 12 knots. Gallant Lady has a range of 4200 nautical miles.

== History ==
Gallant Lady was listed for sale in 2012 for $49,500,000. In February 2012, the vessel was reduced by $7 million to $42,500,000.
