= Frontier Agent =

1948 film by Lambert Hillyer

- Theatrical release poster
- Directed by: Lambert Hillyer
- Screenplay by: J. Benton Cheney
- Produced by: Barney Sarecky
- Starring: Johnny Mack Brown; Raymond Hatton; Reno Browne; Kenneth MacDonald; Dennis Moore; Riley Hill
- Cinematography: Harry Neumann
- Edited by: John C. Fuller
- Production company: Monogram Pictures
- Distributed by: Monogram Pictures
- Release date: May 16, 1948
- Running time: 56 minutes
- Country: United States
- Language: English

Frontier Agent is a 1948 American Western film directed by Lambert Hillyer, and written by J. Benton Cheney. The film stars Johnny Mack Brown, Raymond Hatton, Reno Browne, Kenneth MacDonald, Dennis Moore and Riley Hill. The film was released on May 16, 1948, by Monogram Pictures.

== Cast ==
- Johnny Mack Brown as Johnny Mack Brown
- Raymond Hatton as Cappy
- Reno Browne as Sandra Kerrigan
- Kenneth MacDonald as Burton Wheelock
- Dennis Moore as Larry Foster
- Riley Hill as Joe Farr
- Frank LaRue as Dell Carson
- Ted Adams as Jim Kerrigan
- Virginia Carroll as Paula
- William Ruhl as Carson
- Kansas Moehring as Nevada
- Bill Hale as Eddie
