= William Ruhl =

American actor (1901–1956)

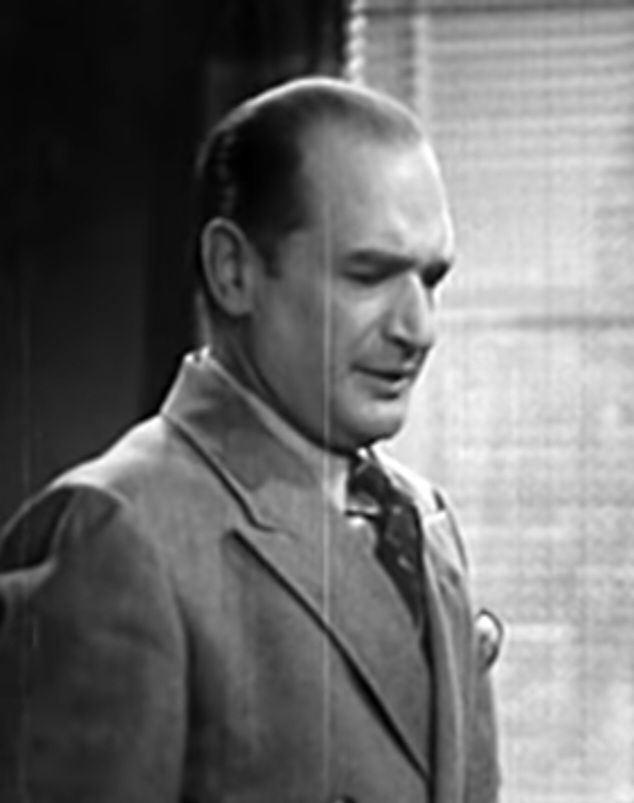
- Ruhl in Star Reporter (1939)
- Born: William Harris Ruhl; October 25, 1901; Colfax, Washington, U.S.
- Died: March 12, 1956 (aged 54); Hollywood, California, U.S.
- Resting place: Pierce Brothers Valhalla Memorial Park
- Occupation: Actor
- Years active: 1934–1952
- Spouse: Lu Miller

William Harris Ruhl (October 25, 1901 – March 12, 1956) was an American character actor of the 1930s, 1940s, and early 1950s.

== Early life ==
Born on October 25, 1901, in Colfax, Washington, Ruhl entered films in the small role of a shopper in 1934's The Man Who Reclaimed His Head, starring Claude Rains and Joan Bennett. During his career, he appeared in over 150 films and television shows, including over 125 feature films. During the 1940s, he was used frequently by Monogram Studios, appearing in several of their series, including Charlie Chan, The Bowery Boys, and Joe Palooka.

== Career ==
Notable films in which he appeared include: Pittsburgh (1942), starring John Wayne, Marlene Dietrich, and Randolph Scott; Alfred Hitchcock's Saboteur, also in 1942; Hit the Ice (1943), starring Bud Abbott and Lou Costello; Michael Curtiz's 1945 drama, Mildred Pierce, for which Joan Crawford won the Academy Award for Best Actress; Life With Father (1947), starring William Powell, Irene Dunne, and Elizabeth Taylor; and Cecil B. DeMille's epic, The Greatest Show on Earth in 1952. Ruhl's final film appearance was in 1953's Above and Beyond, which starred Robert Taylor and Eleanor Parker. In addition to his film work, Ruhl would also make appearances on several television shows, including The Lone Ranger, Hopalong Cassidy, and The Adventures of Wild Bill Hickok.

== Death ==
Ruhl died on March 12, 1956, in Hollywood, California, at the age of 54. He was buried in Pierce Brothers Valhalla Memorial Park in North Hollywood, California.

== Filmography (feature films) ==
(Per AFI database)

- The Man Who Reclaimed His Head (1934)
- Circus Shadows (1935)
- The Daring Young Man (1935)
- It Happened in New York (1935)
- Rendezvous at Midnight (1935)
- Three Kids and a Queen (1935)
- Sutter's Gold (1936)
- Easy to Take (1936)
- Crash Donovan (1936)
- Flying Hostess (1936)
- You Only Live Once (1937)
- Small Town Boy (1937)
- Let Them Live (1937)
- Something to Sing About (1937)
- Tough Kid (1938)
- Wives Under Suspicion (1938)
- Little Tough Guy (1938)
- Room Service (1938)
- Star Reporter (1939)
- The Big Guy (1939)
- They Asked for It (1939)
- Code of the Streets (1939)
- Two Bright Boys (1939)
- I Stole a Million (1939)
- Charlie McCarthy, Detective (1939)
- Gaucho Serenade (1940)
- Phantom Submarine (1940)
- Oklahoma Renegades (1940)
- Texas Terrors (1940)
- Black Friday (1940)
- Diamond Frontier (1940) (as Bill Ruhl)
- It's a Date (1940)
- Appointment for Love (1941)
- Badlands of Dakota (1941)
- Bedtime Story (1941)
- Double Date (1941)
- Gauchos of Eldorado (1941)
- Mr. Dynamite (1941)
- Nice Girl? (1941)
- Road Agent (1941)
- Criminals Within (1941)
- San Francisco Docks (1941)
- Behind the Eight Ball (1942)
- Call Out the Marines (1942)
- The Invisible Agent (1942)
- Jail House Blues (1942)
- The Mummy's Tomb (1942) (as Bill Ruhl)
- My Favorite Spy (1942)
- The Mystery of Marie Roget (1942) (as Bill Ruhl)
- North to the Klondike (1942)
- Paris Calling (1942)
- Pittsburgh (1942)
- Juke Box Jenny (1942)
- Saboteur (1942) - Deputy Marshal (uncredited)
- Treat 'Em Rough (1942)
- Unseen Enemy (1942)
- Days of Old Cheyenne (1943)
- Frontier Badmen (1943)
- Hit the Ice (1943)
- The Mad Ghoul (1943)
- Mister Big (1943)
- Rhythm of the Islands (1943)
- So's Your Uncle (1943)
- We've Never Been Licked (1943)
- None Shall Escape (1944)
- Roger Touhy, Gangster (1944)
- Bowery Champs (1944) (as Bill Ruhl)
- Adventures of Kitty O'Day (1945)
- Mildred Pierce (1945)
- The Shanghai Cobra (1945) (as Bill Ruhl)
- Behind the Mask (1946) (as Bill Ruhl)
- Below the Deadline (1946)
- Bowery Bombshell (1946)
- Dark Alibi (1946)
- Decoy (1946)
- Don't Gamble with Strangers (1946)
- House of Horrors (1946)
- In Fast Company (1946)
- The Killers (1946)
- Little Miss Big (1946)
- Live Wires (1946)
- Mr. Hex (1946)
- Unexpected Guest (1947)
- Hard Boiled Mahoney (1947)
- The Hat-box Mystery (1947)
- Kilroy Was Here (1947)
- The Law Comes to Gunsight (1947) (as William H. Ruhl)
- Life with Father (1947)
- Louisiana (1947) (as Bill Ruhl)
- Prairie Express (1947) (as William H. Ruhl)
- Ride the Pink Horse (1947)
- Violence (1947)
- Always Together (1948)
- All My Sons (1948)
- Angels' Alley (1948)
- Belle Starr's Daughter (1948) (as William H. Ruhl)
- Cowboy Cavalier (1948) (as William H. Ruhl)
- Frontier Agent (1948)
- I Wouldn't Be in Your Shoes (1948)
- Jinx Money (1948)
- Rocky (1948)
- Shanghai Chest (1948)
- Smugglers' Cove (1948)
- Song of My Heart (1948)
- Song of the Drifter (1948)
- Wallflower (1948)
- Who Killed Doc Robbin (1948) (as Bill Ruhl)
- Joe Palooka in Winner Take All (1948)
- Incident (1949)
- Alimony (1949)
- Haunted Trails (1949) (as William H. Ruhl)
- Henry, the Rainmaker (1949)
- Hold That Baby! (1949)
- Impact (1949) (as Bill Ruhl)
- The Lawton Story (1949)
- Shadows of the West (1949) (as William H. Ruhl)
- Side Street (1949)
- South of St. Louis (1949)
- Trouble Makers (1949)
- Brand of Fear (1949)
- California Passage (1950)
- Code of the Silver Sage (1950)
- The Great Jewel Robber (1950)
- Unmasked (1950)
- Pals of the Golden West (1951)
- The Company She Keeps (1951)
- Because of You (1952)
- The Greatest Show on Earth (1952)
- Above and Beyond (1953)
