= Courtin' Trouble =

1948 film by Ford Beebe

- Theatrical release poster
- Directed by: Ford Beebe
- Screenplay by: Ronald Davidson
- Produced by: Louis Gray
- Starring: Jimmy Wakely; Dub Taylor; Virginia Belmont; Leonard Penn; Marshall Reed; Steve Clark
- Cinematography: Harry Neumann
- Edited by: Carl Pierson
- Production company: Monogram Pictures
- Distributed by: Monogram Pictures
- Release date: November 21, 1948
- Running time: 56 minutes
- Country: United States
- Language: English

Courtin' Trouble is a 1948 American Western film directed by Ford Beebe and written by Ronald Davidson. The film stars Jimmy Wakely, Dub Taylor, Virginia Belmont, Leonard Penn, Marshall Reed and Steve Clark. The film was released on November 21, 1948, by Monogram Pictures.

== Plot ==
Jimmy Wakely, an undercover lawman posing as a singer at Dawson’s saloon, arrests a gunman named Becker after cattleman Curtis accuses him of murdering rancher Steve Graves. Meanwhile, rancher Reed, head of the Cattlemen’s Association, considers relocating their headquarters due to a series of attacks on local cattlemen. Dawson, who also leads the Merchants’ Association, hires attorney Carol Madison to defend Becker. The case takes a turn when Curtis, the key witness, is killed and Becker is released. Judge Madison, Carol’s father, returns to town after negotiating a railroad spur line extension but is soon murdered as well. Jimmy then sets out to uncover the truth behind the killings and the motive driving them.

== Cast ==
- Jimmy Wakely as Jimmy Wakely
- Dub Taylor as Cannonball
- Virginia Belmont as Carol Madison
- Leonard Penn as Dawson
- Marshall Reed as Cody
- Steve Clark as Mark Reed
- House Peters Jr. as Burt Larsen
- Frank LaRue as Judge Madison
- William Bailey as Curtis
- Bud Osborne as Sheriff
- Bill Hale as Ed Stewart
- Bob Woodward as Gill
- Carol Henry as Bartender
- Bill Potter as Steve Graves
