= Kay Morley (actress) =

American actress (1920–2020)

- Born: Leona Elaine Winona DaVinna; April 17, 1920; Pocatello, Idaho, U.S.
- Died: November 17, 2020 (aged 100); Palm Springs, California, U.S.
- Occupation: Actress
- Spouse(s): Richard Crane; Lloyd Baird
- Children: 1

Leona Elaine Winona DaVinna (April 17, 1920 – November 17, 2020), known professionally as Kay Morley, was an American actress who worked in Hollywood in the 1940s and 1950s. She was primarily known for her work in B movies.

Morley died on November 17, 2020, at her home in Palm Springs, California, aged 100.

== Biography ==
Leona Elaine Winona DaVinna was born on April 17, 1920, in Pocatello, Idaho, and she spent her childhood on a Native American reservation where her father was superintendent. She later recounted that she was visiting a friend in Hollywood when she was spotted by an agent at a soda counter.

Morley got her start in Hollywood as a Goldwyn glamour girl. She appeared in a series of films in the 1940s, including Up in Arms and The Princess and the Pirate. In the 1950s, she worked mostly in television.

She was married twice: to actor Richard Crane and to Lloyd Baird. She and Crane had at least one child together.

== Selected filmography ==
- Sealed Cargo (1951)
- Trails End (1949)
- Outlaw Brand (1948)
- Letter from an Unknown Woman (1948)
- Campus Honeymoon (1948)
- Secret Beyond the Door... (1947)
- Code of the Saddle (1947)
- Six-Gun Serenade (1947)
- Betty Co-Ed (1946)
- It's a Pleasure (1945)
- The Princess and the Pirate (1944)
- Youth Aflame (1944)
- Show Business (1944)
- Up in Arms (1944)
