= Valley of Fire (film) =

1951 film by John English

- Theatrical release poster
- Directed by: John English
- Written by: Gerald Geraghty
- Story by: Earle Snell
- Produced by: Armand Schaefer
- Starring: Gene Autry; Gail Davis; Russell Hayden; Christine Larson; Harry Lauter; Terry Frost
- Cinematography: William Bradford
- Edited by: James Sweeney
- Production company: Gene Autry Productions
- Distributed by: Columbia Pictures
- Release date: November 20, 1951
- Running time: 70 minutes
- Country: United States
- Language: English

Valley of Fire is a 1951 American Western film directed by John English, written by Gerald Geraghty and starring Gene Autry, Gail Davis, Russell Hayden, Christine Larson, Harry Lauter and Terry Frost. The film was released on November 20, 1951 by Columbia Pictures.

== Cast ==
- Gene Autry as Gene Autry
- Gail Davis as Laurie
- Russell Hayden as Steve Guilford
- Christine Larson as Bee Laverne
- Harry Lauter as Tod Rawlings
- Terry Frost as Grady McKean
- Barbara Stanley as Gail
- Teddy Infuhr as Virgil
- Margie Liszt as Widow Blanche
- Pat Buttram as Breezie Larrabee
- Champion as Champ
