= Brand of Fear =

1949 film by Oliver Drake

- Theatrical release poster
- Directed by: Oliver Drake
- Screenplay by: Basil Dickey
- Produced by: Louis Gray
- Starring: Jimmy Wakely; Dub Taylor; Tom London; Gail Davis; Marshall Reed; William Ruhl
- Cinematography: Harry Neumann
- Edited by: Carl Pierson
- Production company: Monogram Pictures
- Distributed by: Monogram Pictures
- Release date: July 10, 1949
- Running time: 56 minutes
- Country: United States
- Language: English

Brand of Fear is a 1949 American Western film directed by Oliver Drake and written by Basil Dickey. The film stars Jimmy Wakely, Dub Taylor, Tom London, Gail Davis, Marshall Reed and William Ruhl. The film was released on July 10, 1949, by Monogram Pictures.

== Plot summary ==
The film shows Jimmy and Cannonball taking Anne Lamont to Oreville, where two outlaws bother her. Marshal Blackjack Flint steps in, and the clash exposes his past as a wanted man and Anne’s father. When Derringer tries to use this against him, Jimmy and Cannonball back Flint in the final confrontation.

== Cast ==
- Jimmy Wakely as Jimmy Wakely
- Dub Taylor as Cannonball
- Tom London as Blackjack Flint
- Gail Davis as Anne Lamont
- Marshall Reed as Cal Derringer
- William Ruhl as Tom Slade
- Mike Ragan as Butch Keeler
- Boyd Stockman as Jed Mailer
- Myron Healey as Jeffers
- Bob Curtis as Steve
- Frank McCarroll as Larry
- William Bailey as Frank Martin
- Bill Potter as Mac
- Joe Galbreath as Nick
