= Crashing Thru (1949 film) =

1949 film

- Theatrical release poster
- Directed by: Ray Taylor
- Screenplay by: Adele Buffington
- Produced by: Barney Sarecky
- Starring: Whip Wilson; Andy Clyde; Christine Larson; Tris Coffin; Steve Darrell; George J. Lewis
- Cinematography: Harry Neumann
- Edited by: John C. Fuller
- Production company: Monogram Pictures
- Distributed by: Monogram Pictures
- Release date: January 9, 1949
- Running time: 58 minutes
- Country: United States
- Language: English

Crashing Thru is a 1949 American Western film directed by Ray Taylor and written by Adele Buffington. The film stars Whip Wilson, Andy Clyde, Christine Larson, Tris Coffin, Steve Darrell and George J. Lewis. The film was released on January 9, 1949, by Monogram Pictures.

== Cast ==
- Whip Wilson as Whip Wilson
- Andy Clyde as Winks Winkle
- Christine Larson as Stella Drew
- Tris Coffin as Cliff Devin
- Steve Darrell as John Mason
- George J. Lewis as Jarvis
- Jan Bryant as Janet Raymond
- Kenne Duncan as Tim Raymond
- Virginia Carroll as Mrs. Grey
- Tom Quinn as Bartender Gus
- Dee Cooper as Bill
- Jack Richardson as Baker
