= Dave Milton =

American art director

- Born: September 6, 1888; Lane, Kansas, United States
- Died: June 18, 1979 (aged 90); Woodland Hills, California; United States
- Other name: David Dorliska Milton
- Occupation: Art director
- Years active: 1940–1963

Dave Milton (1888–1979) was an American art director. He spent his career at Monogram Pictures where he was a prolific contributor to the studio's films, working on more than three hundred. He is sometimes credited as David Milton.

== Selected filmography ==
- French Leave (1948)
- Fighting Fools (1949)
- Texas Lawmen (1951)
- Whistling Hills (1951)
- Dead or Alive (1951)
- Yellow Fin (1951)
- Oklahoma Justice (1951)
- Fargo (1952)
- Kansas Territory (1952)
- Montana Incident (1952)
- The Women of Pitcairn Island (1956)

== Bibliography ==
- Pitts, Michael R. Western Film Series of the Sound Era. McFarland, 2009.
