= Song of the Drifter =

1948 film by Lambert Hillyer

- Theatrical release poster
- Directed by: Lambert Hillyer
- Screenplay by: Frank H. Young
- Produced by: Louis Gray
- Starring: Jimmy Wakely; Dub Taylor; Mildred Coles; William Ruhl; Marshall Reed; Patsy Moran
- Cinematography: Harry Neumann
- Edited by: Fred Maguire
- Production company: Monogram Pictures
- Distributed by: Monogram Pictures
- Release date: January 17, 1948
- Running time: 53 minutes
- Country: United States
- Language: English

Song of the Drifter is a 1948 American Western film directed by Lambert Hillyer and written by Frank H. Young. The film stars Jimmy Wakely, Dub Taylor, Mildred Coles, William Ruhl, Marshall Reed and Patsy Moran. The film was released on January 17, 1948, by Monogram Pictures.

== Cast ==
- Jimmy Wakely as Jimmy Wakely
- Dub Taylor as Cannonball
- Mildred Coles as Martha Fennamore
- William Ruhl as Philip Judson
- Marshall Reed as Easy
- Patsy Moran as Aunt Martha Fennamore
- Frank LaRue as Turner
- Steve Clark as Sheriff
- Wheaton Chambers as Doctor
- Bud Osborne as Eph
- Bob Woodward as Joe
- Dick Reinhart as Dick
- Fiddlin' Arthur Smith as Art
- Cliffie Stone as Cliff
