= Song of the Sierras =

1946 film directed by Oliver Drake

- Theatrical release poster
- Directed by: Oliver Drake
- Screenplay by: Elmer Clifton
- Story by: Oliver Drake
- Produced by: Oliver Drake
- Starring: Jimmy Wakely; Lee "Lasses" White; Jack Baxley; Jean Carlin; Iris Lancaster; Zon Murray
- Cinematography: Marcel Le Picard
- Edited by: Ralph Dixon
- Music by: Frank Sanucci
- Production company: Monogram Pictures
- Distributed by: Monogram Pictures
- Release date: December 28, 1946
- Running time: 58 minutes
- Country: United States
- Language: English

Song of the Sierras is a 1946 American Western film directed by Oliver Drake and written by Elmer Clifton. The film stars Jimmy Wakely, Lee "Lasses" White, Jack Baxley, Jean Carlin, Iris Lancaster and Zon Murray. The film was released on December 28, 1946, by Monogram Pictures.

== Cast ==
- Jimmy Wakely as Jimmy Wakely
- Lee "Lasses" White as Lasses White
- Jack Baxley as Ed Rawlins
- Jean Carlin as Mary Ann Blake
- Iris Lancaster as Flora Carter
- Zon Murray as Sam Phelps
- Budd Buster as Matt Blake
- Bob Duncan as Bill Danvers
- Buster Slaven as Horace Aikens
- Jonathan Black as Colonel Stockton
- Jasper Palmer as Hiram Hobbs
- Billy Dix as Billy
- Wesley Tuttle as Happy
