= Riders of the Dawn (1945 film) =

1945 film directed by Oliver Drake

- Directed by: Oliver Drake
- Written by: Bert Horswell; Louise Rousseau
- Produced by: Charles J. Bigelow
- Starring: Jimmy Wakely; Lee 'Lasses' White; Sarah Padden
- Cinematography: William A. Sickner
- Edited by: William Austin
- Music by: Frank Sanucci
- Production company: Monogram Pictures
- Distributed by: Monogram Pictures
- Release date: November 3, 1945
- Running time: 58 minutes
- Country: United States
- Language: English

Riders of the Dawn (re-titled for television as Riding the Dusty Trail) is a 1945 American Western film directed by Oliver Drake and starring Jimmy Wakely, Lee 'Lasses' White and Sarah Padden. It was produced and distributed by Monogram Pictures. The film's sets were designed by the art director Vin Taylor.

== Cast ==
- Jimmy Wakely as Jimmy Wakely
- Lee 'Lasses' White as Lasses White
- John James as Dusty Smith
- Sarah Padden as Melinda Pringle
- Horace Murphy as Sheriff Beasley
- Phyllis Adair as Penny Pringle
- Jack Baxley as Doc Judd Thomas
- The Texas Stars as Band

== Bibliography ==
- Terry, Rowan. The American Western A Complete Film Guide. 2013.
