= Carol Henry (actor) =

American actor (1918–1987)

Carol Henry (July 14, 1918 – September 17, 1987) was an American character actor who played the parts of henchmen in Western films and television series throughout the 1940s, 1950s and 1960s. He also served as a stunt man in various films although all his work in that field went uncredited.

Born in Oklahoma, he appeared in an episode of Sergeant Preston of the Yukon in 1955 as McClain, a murderer. In 1958 he appeared as a posse member in the TV western Tales of Wells Fargo in the episode titled "Butch Cassidy."

Carol Henry died in North Hollywood, aged 69.

== Selected filmography ==
- Gun Talk (1947)
- Courtin' Trouble (1948)
- Gunning for Justice (1948)
- Hidden Danger (1948)
- The Sheriff of Medicine Bow (1948)
- Across the Rio Grande (1949)
- Gun Law Justice (1949)
- Trails End (1949)
- Roll, Thunder, Roll! (1949)
- Range Land (1949)
- Outlaw Gold (1950)
- Gunslingers (1950)
- The Longhorn (1951)
