= Dub Taylor =

American actor (1907–1994)

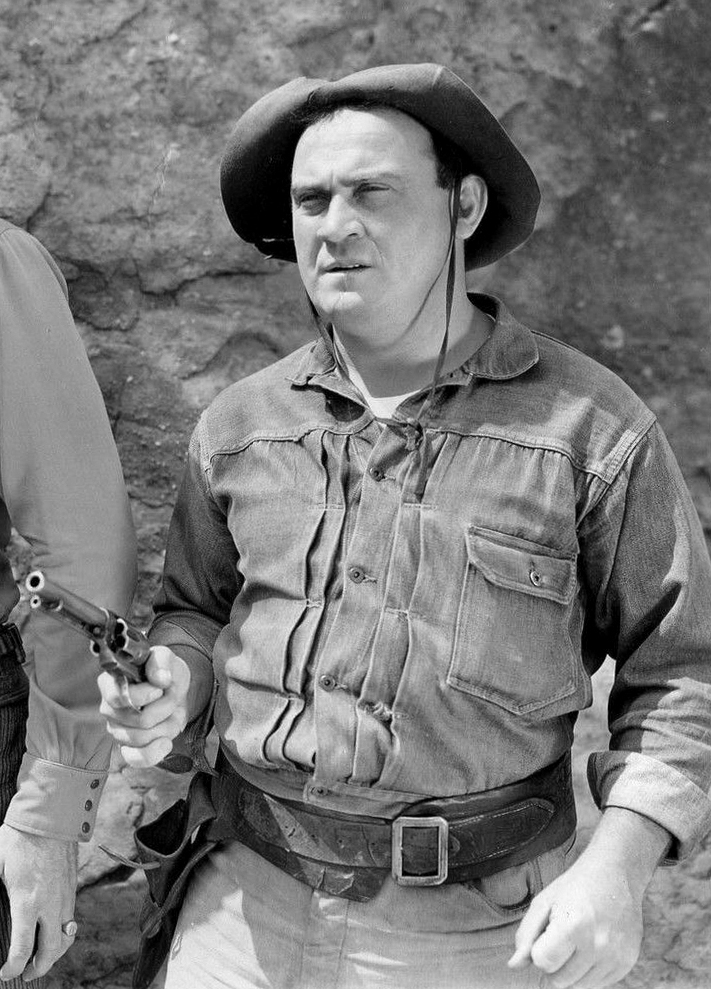
- Taylor in Rustlers of the Badlands (1945)
- Born: Walter Clarence Taylor Jr. February 26, 1907; Richmond, Virginia, U.S.
- Died: October 3, 1994 (aged 87); Los Angeles, California, U.S.
- Occupation: Actor
- Years active: 1938–1994
- Spouse: Florence Gertrude Heffernan (m. 1930; died 1987)
- Children: 2; including Buck Taylor

Walter Clarence "Dub" Taylor Jr. (February 26, 1907 – October 3, 1994) was an American character actor who from the 1940s into the 1990s worked extensively in films and on television, often in Westerns but also in comedies. He is the father of actor and painter Buck Taylor.

== Early life ==
Taylor was born February 26, 1907, in Richmond, Virginia, the middle child of five children of Minnie and Walter C. Taylor Sr. According to the federal census of 1920, he had two older sisters, Minnie Marg[aret] and Maud; a younger brother named George; and a little sister, Edna Fay. The family moved to Augusta, Georgia, around 1912, when Walter was five years old, and lived there until he was 13. Taylor's mother was a Pennsylvania native; and his father, who worked in Augusta at that time as a cotton broker, was from North Carolina. While in Georgia as a boy, Walter Jr. got his lifelong nickname when his friends began calling him "W", then shortened it further to "Dub".

== Career ==
=== Film ===
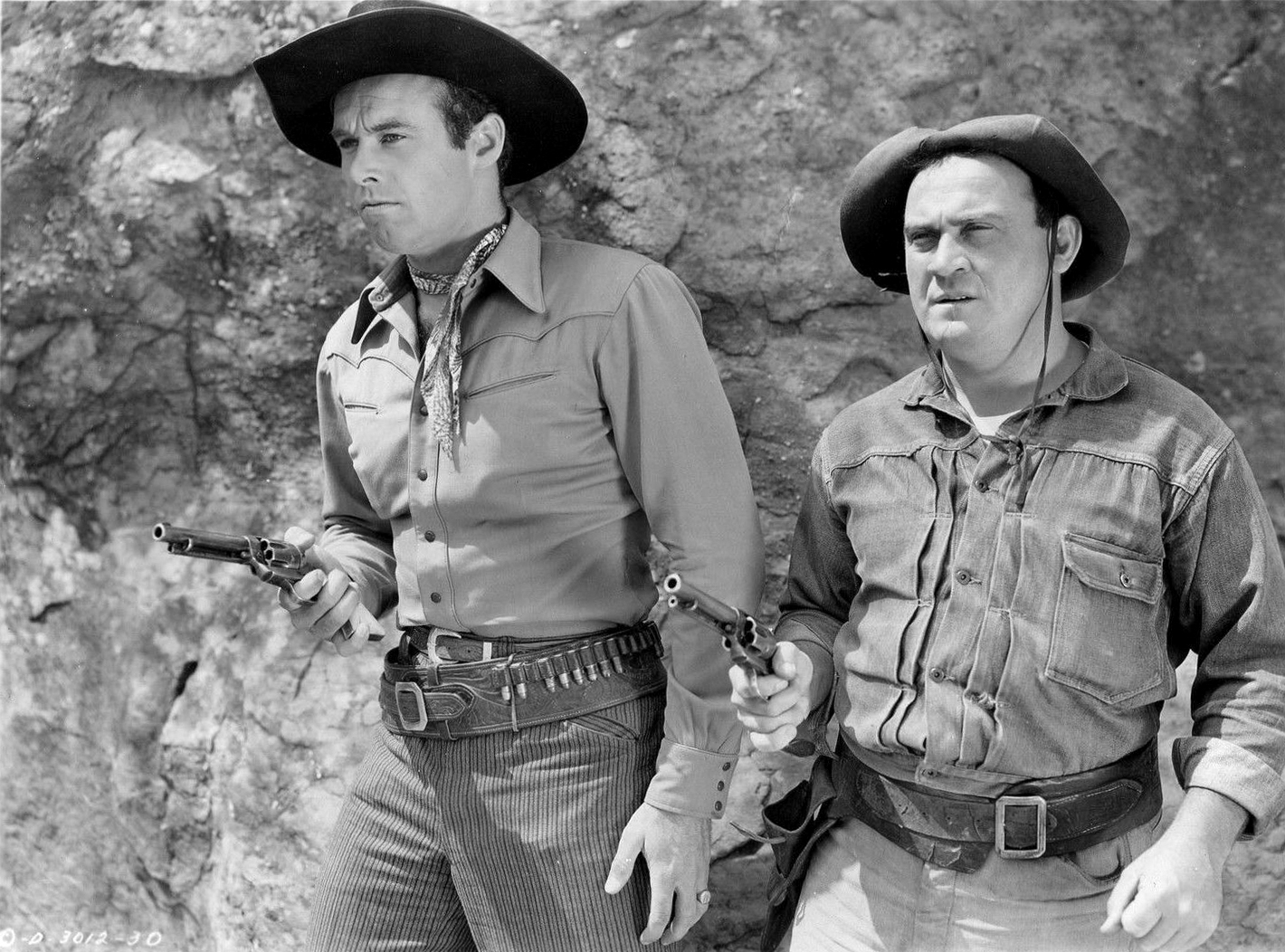
Tex Harding (left) and Taylor in the 1945 Western Rustlers of the Badlands

A vaudeville performer, Taylor made his film debut in 1938 as the cheerful ex-football captain Ed Carmichael in Frank Capra's You Can't Take It with You, released by Columbia Pictures. He secured the part because the role required an actor who could play tuned percussion. During the 1950s and early 1960s, he used his xylophone skills on several television shows, including the syndicated series Ranch Party.

== Cannonball ==
Columbia kept Taylor under contract -- Capra used him again in Mr. Smith Goes to Washington (1939). Columbia assigned him to play comic sidekicks in the studio's westerns. In the 1939 film Taming of the West he originated the character of Cannonball, a role he played for the next 10 years in more than 50 films. Cannonball played sidekick to Wild Bill Elliott in 13 features, then Russell Hayden in eight, and finally Charles Starrett in 15. Starrett was the studio's leading cowboy star and wanted to work with Dub Taylor indefinitely, but in 1945 Columbia replaced Taylor with Smiley Burnette. Burnette had just left Republic Pictures, and Columbia executives felt that Burnette's established name value would benefit the Starrett series. "I hated to see Dub go," recalled Starrett. "He was a good musician as well as a good actor. I begged studio bosses to keep him but they said, 'They're a dime a dozen.'"

In 1948 Taylor signed with Monogram Pictures to resume the Cannonball role opposite Monogram's newest cowboy star, Jimmy Wakely. Taylor later dropped the Cannonball name because he felt it held him back from roles in films with larger budgets.

== Character actor ==
The 1954 film Dragnet had Taylor in the uncredited role of gangster Miller Starkie, who is killed in the opening scene. He also had bits in two major features of 1954, A Star Is Born and Them!. He had a small role in the 1958 Walt Disney film Tonka as a rustler of stray horses for sale. The same year, he performed in No Time for Sergeants as the representative of the draft board who summoned Will Stockdale (Andy Griffith) from his rural home in Georgia to the United States Air Force.

He later joined Sam Peckinpah's stock company in 1965's Major Dundee, playing a professional horse thief. He also appeared in The Wild Bunch (1969) as a minister who gets his flock shot in the film's opening scene; in Junior Bonner (1972), The Getaway (1972), and Pat Garrett and Billy the Kid (1973) as an aging, eccentric outlaw friend of Billy's; and in Michael Cimino's crime film Thunderbolt and Lightfoot (1974), He also played Ivan Moss, father of Michael J. Pollard's character C. W. Moss, in Bonnie and Clyde (1967).

He portrayed an ill-tempered chuckwagon cook in the 1969 film The Undefeated, starring John Wayne and Rock Hudson, and appeared in Support Your Local Gunfighter (1971) as the drunken Doc Shultz.

He appeared in Back to the Future Part III (1990) with veteran Western actors Pat Buttram and Harry Carey Jr. Taylor's last film role was in Maverick (1994), and although he had only a fleeting appearance as an unnamed "Room Clerk", his name appears in the film's opening credits.

=== Television ===
In the 1950s, he guest-starred three times on the syndicated series The Range Rider, starring Jock Mahoney and Dick Jones. He appeared in the 1955 episode "The Outlander" of Cheyenne, and on the syndicated series Death Valley Days playing the Colorado silver miner "Chicken Bill" Lovell.

In 1957, Taylor was cast alongside Alan Hale, Jr., in the syndicated Casey Jones TV series. In 1960, he portrayed the lovable cantankerous Smudge in Laramie's "No Second Chance." He played in the 1961 Perry Mason episode "The Case of the Grumbling Grandfather". Taylor was on The Lloyd Bridges Show (1962–1963), in the episodes "My Child Is Yet a Stranger" and "The Tyrees of Capital Hill". He was in The Andy Griffith Show, first as the preacher who marries Charlene Darling to Dud Wash, then as postmaster Talbert, and next as the brother-in-law of town handyman Emmett Clark.

Taylor performed on other sitcoms, including Hazel with Shirley Booth. His character, Mitch Brady, was owner of a local cab company and a frequent boyfriend of Hazel's. He was cast in an episode of I Love Lucy, and on The Brian Keith Show, and in a fourth-season episode of The Cosby Show. He was on NBC's series Laredo and The High Chaparral.

Taylor played Houston Lamb in four episodes of Little House On The Prairie in seasons six and seven (1979 to 1981). He appeared on Hee Haw for six seasons, from 1985 to 1991, where he was mostly seen as a regular in the Lulu's Truck Stop skit featuring Lulu Roman and Gailard Sartain. Taylor was in several episodes of Designing Women as a rustic enamored with the women from Sugarbaker's during a camping expedition.

Starting in the late 1970s, Taylor appeared in a series of Western-style commercials for Hubba Bubba bubble gum. In the radio versions of the commercials, his character was named "The Geezer".

In 1994, he appeared in a commercial for Pace Foods, performing as one of four participants in a fair's "Dip-Off" contest, where two other competitors and he use their "secret ingredient" of Pace Picante Sauce in their dips. When the fourth participant holds up a jar of "Mexican sauce" as a "secret ingredient", Taylor's character proclaims that it was "made in New York City!"

== Death ==
Taylor died of a heart attack on October 3, 1994, in Los Angeles. He was cremated, and his ashes were scattered near Westlake Village, California.

== Partial filmography ==
=== Directed by Frank Capra ===
- You Can't Take It with You (1938) as Ed Carmichael
- Mr. Smith Goes to Washington (1939) as Reporter (uncredited)

=== Westerns starring Bill Elliott ===
- The Taming of the West (1939) as Cannonball
- The Return of Wild Bill (1940) as Cannonball
- Prairie Schooners (1940) as Cannonball
- The Wildcat of Tucson (1940) as Cannonball
- The Return of Daniel Boone (1941) as Cannonball
- Hands Across the Rockies (1941) as Cannonball Taylor
- The Son of Davy Crockett (1941) as Cannonball

=== Westerns starring Russell Hayden ===
- The Lone Prairie (1942) as Cannonball
- Riders of the Northwest Mounted (1943) as Cannonball
- Saddles and Sagebrush (1943) as Cannonball
- The Last Horseman (1944) as Cannonball

=== Westerns starring Charles Starrett ===
- Cowboy in the Clouds (1943) as Cannonball
- Saddle Leather Law (1944) as Cannonball
- Cowboy Canteen (1944) as Cannonball
- Cyclone Prairie Rangers (1944) as Cannonball
- Both Barrels Blazing (1945) as Cannonball
- Rustlers of the Badlands (1945) as Cannonball

=== Westerns starring Jimmy Wakely ===
- Courtin' Trouble (1948) as Cannonball
- Cowboy Cavalier (1948) as Cannonball
- Song of the Drifter (1948) as Cannonball
- Silver Trails (1948) as Cannonball
- Across the Rio Grande (1949) as Cannonball Taylor
- Brand of Fear (1949) as Cannonball

=== As character actor ===
- Tanks a Million (1941) as Malloy (uncredited)
- What's Buzzin', Cousin? (1943) as Jed (uncredited)
- Minesweeper (1943) as Seaman Stubby Gordon (uncredited)
- Riding High (1950) as Joe
- Lure of the Wilderness (1952) as Sheriff Jepson (uncredited)
- The Story of Will Rogers (1952) as Actor (scenes deleted)
- Woman of the North Country (1952) as Bob (uncredited)
- The Charge at Feather River (1953) as Danowicz
- Those Redheads from Seattle (1953) as Townsman (uncredited)
- Crime Wave (1953) as Gus Snider
- Riding Shotgun (1954) as Eddie (uncredited)
- Them! (1954) as Railroad Yard Watchman (uncredited)
- Dragnet (1954) as Miller Starkie (uncredited)
- The Bounty Hunter (1954) as Eli Danvers
- A Star Is Born (1954) as Norman's Driver (voice, uncredited)
- Tall Man Riding (1955) as Townsman (uncredited)
- The McConnell Story (1955) as Angry Technical Sergeant (uncredited)
- I Died a Thousand Times (1955) as Ed (uncredited)
- The Fastest Gun Alive (1956) as Nolan Brown (uncredited)
- Tension at Table Rock (1956) as Ruffian (uncredited)
- You Can't Run Away from It (1956) as Joe
- No Time for Sergeants (1958) as McKinney
- Hot Rod Gang (1958) as Al Berrywhiff
- Street of Darkness (1958) as Duffy Tyler
- Auntie Mame (1958) as County Veterinarian (uncredited)
- A Hole in the Head (1959) as Fred
- Home from the Hill (1960) as Bob Skaggs (uncredited)
- Parrish (1961) as Teet Howie
- Sweet Bird of Youth (1962) as Dan Hatcher
- Black Gold (1962) as Doc
- Spencer's Mountain (1963) as Percy Cook
- Major Dundee (1965) as Priam
- The Hallelujah Trail (1965) as Clayton Howell
- The Cincinnati Kid (1965) as First Dealer
- The Adventures of Bullwhip Griffin (1967) as Timekeeper
- Don't Make Waves (1967) as Electrician
- Bonnie and Clyde (1967) as Ivan Moss
- Johnny Banco (1967)
- The Money Jungle (1967) as Pete Jensen
- Bandolero! (1968) as Attendant
- The Shakiest Gun in the West (1968) as Pop McGovern
- Death of a Gunfighter (1969) as Doc Adams
- The Wild Bunch (1969) as Wainscoat
- The Learning Tree (1969) as Spikey
- The Undefeated (1969) as McCartney
- The Reivers (1969) as Dr. B.F. Peabody
- Ride a Northbound Horse (1969) as Purse
- ...tick...tick...tick... (1970) as Junior
- The Liberation of L.B. Jones (1970) as Mayor
- A Man Called Horse (1970) as Joe
- The Wild Country (1970) as Phil
- Menace on the Mountain (1970) as Cicero Everhart
- Support Your Local Gunfighter (1971) as Doc Schultz
- Man and Boy (1971) as Atkins
- Evel Knievel (1971) as Turquoise Smith
- Wild in the Sky (1972) as Officer Roddenberry
- Junior Bonner (1972) as Del
- The Getaway (1972) as Laughlin
- Country Blue (1973) as Jumpy Belk
- Tom Sawyer (1973) as Clayton
- Pat Garrett and Billy the Kid (1973) as Josh
- Thunderbolt and Lightfoot (1974) as Station Attendant
- The Fortune (1975) as Rattlesnake Tom
- Poor Pretty Eddie (1975) as Justice of the Peace Floyd
- Hearts of the West (1975) as Nevada Ticket Agent
- Flash and the Firecat (1975)
- Creature from Black Lake (1976) as Grandpaw Bridges
- Burnt Offerings (1976) as Walker
- Treasure of Matecumbe (1976) as Sheriff Forbes
- Pony Express Rider (1976) as Boomer Riley
- Gator (1976) as Mayor Caffey
- The Winds of Autumn (1976) as Rattler S. Gravley
- The Great Smokey Roadblock (1977) as Harley Davidson
- Moonshine County Express (1977) as Uncle Bill
- The Rescuers (1977) as Digger (voice)
- Beartooth (1978)
- They Went That-A-Way & That-A-Way (1978) as Gunner
- 1941 (1979) as Mr. Malcomb
- Soggy Bottom U.S.A (1980) as Cottonmouth Gorch
- Used Cars (1980) as Tucker
- Cannonball Run II (1984) as Sheriff
- The Best of Times (1986) as Mac
- Once Upon a Texas Train (1988, TV Movie) as Charlie Lee
- Back to the Future Part III (1990) as Levi, Saloon Old-Timer #1
- Conagher (1991, TV Movie) as Station Agent
- My Heroes Have Always Been Cowboys (1991) as Gimme Cap
- Falling from Grace (1992) as Grandpa Parks
- Maverick (1994) as Room Clerk (final film role)

=== Television ===
- I Love Lucy (1955), season 5, episode 8, titled "Lucy Goes to the Rodeo", as Rattlesnake Jones
- Casey Jones (1957-1958) as Wallie Sims, 32 episodes
- The Andy Griffith Show (1960) season 1, episode 3 titled “The Guitar Player” Talbot the postman
- Twilight Zone (1962) season 3, episode 23 titled "The Last Rites of Jeff Myrtlebank" as Mr. Peters
- Dennis the Menace (1960), season 1, episode 22, titled "Dennis and the TV Set" as Opie
- Laramie (1960), season 2, episode 11, titled "No Second Chance" as Smudge
- Hazel (1962-1963), as Mitch Brady, 4 episodes
- The Andy Griffith Show (1963), season 3, episode 31 titled "Mountain Wedding" as The Preacher
- My Favorite Martian (1964), season 1, episode 15, titled "Poor Litter Rich Cat",
- Please Don't Eat the Daisies (1965), as Ed Hewley, 5 episodes
- The Wild Wild West (1965), season 1, episode 5, "The Night of the Casual Killer", as Guard
- The Monroes (1966-1967) as Cyrus, 2 episodes
- The Wild Wild West (1967), season 3, episode 15, "The Night of the Running Death", as Pete
- The Monkees (1967) – Paw in S2:E7, "Hillbilly Honeymoon"
- Bonanza (1967-1971), 6 episodes as Barlow / Simon / Otto / Luke Calhoun
- Gunsmoke (1967-1970) as Farnum / Rev. Finney Cox / Noah Riker / Bartender / Cook / Sonny Starr
- The Andy Griffith Show (1968) season 8 "Emmett's brother-in-law"
- Hawaii Five-O (1971), Season 3 "Dear Enemy" as Ray Tobias
- Partridge Family (1971), season 2, episode 6, "Whatever Happened To Moby Dick" as Flicker
- Emergency! (1973) season 2, episode 16, "Syndrome" as an old man
- Chopper One (1974) episode 12, "Downtime" as Rudy
- Little House on the Prairie (1980), 4 episodes as Houston Lamb
- Darkroom (1981), season 1, episode 2, titled "Uncle George"
- The Cosby Show (1988), season 4, episode 16
- Designing Women (1989), season 4, episode 4, "The Nightmare From Hee Haw", and episode 20, "Tornado Watch" as Daddy Jones
