= Jimmy Wakely =

American singer-songwriter (1914–1982)

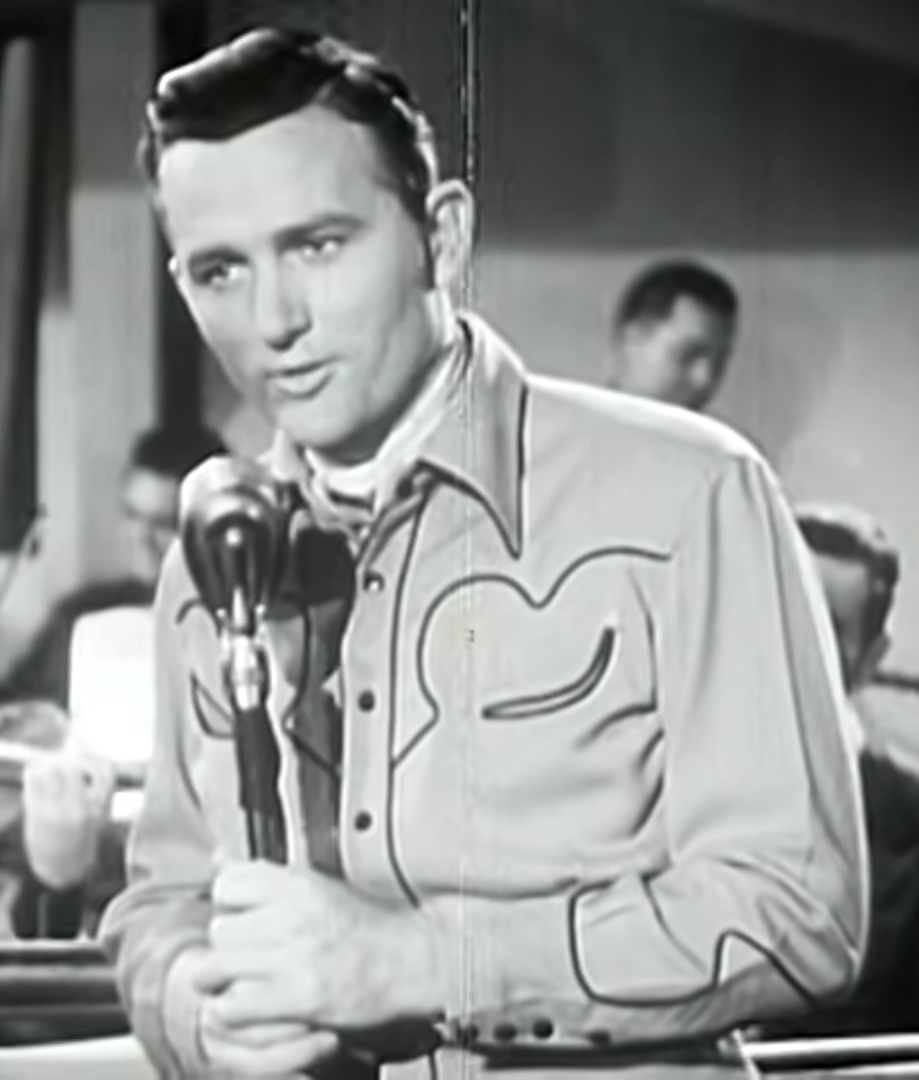
- Wakely in I'm from Arkansas (1944)

Background information
- Born: James Clarence Wakeley; February 16, 1914; Howard County, Arkansas, U.S.
- Died: September 23, 1982 (aged 68) Mission Hills, California, U.S.
- Genres: Country, Western films
- Occupations: Singer, songwriter, actor
- Instruments: Vocals, guitar
- Years active: 1939–1970s
- Labels: Decca, Capitol, Coral, Dot, Shasta Records

James Clarence Wakely (February 16, 1914 – September 23, 1982) was an American actor, songwriter, country music vocalist, and one of the last singing cowboys. During the 1930s, 1940s and 1950s, he released records, appeared in several B-Western movies with most of the major studios, appeared on radio and television and even had his own series of comic books. His duet singles with Margaret Whiting from 1949 until 1951, produced a string of top seven hits, including 1949's number one hit on the US country chart and pop music chart, "Slippin' Around". Wakely owned two music publishing companies in later years, and performed at the Grand Ole Opry until shortly before his death.

== Biography ==
=== Early years ===
Wakely was born in Howard County, Arkansas, but his family moved to Rosedale, Oklahoma by 1920. As a teenager, he changed his surname to Wakely, dropping the second "e".

=== Country musician ===
In 1937 in Oklahoma City, Oklahoma, he formed The Bell Boys, a country Western singing group, named after their Bell Clothing sponsor. The group performed locally, made some recordings, and did frequent radio broadcasts over Oklahoma City's WKY. Johnny Bond, Dick Reinhart, Scotty Harrell and Jack Cheney were members of the Bell Boys and later groups.

During a tour through Oklahoma, the musician and movie star Gene Autry invited Wakely to come to California. Autry felt the group might be a good addition to his new Melody Ranch radio show, which debuted on CBS in January 1940. The Wakely Trio joined the show in mid-1940. He stayed for a couple of years, then left because of movie commitments and a recording contract with Decca Records that ran from 1941–1942 through 1947. Johnny Bond stayed with the show for most of its run (the show left the air in 1956).

=== Personal life ===
Wakely married Dora Inez Miser on December 13, 1935. They had four children: Deanna, Carol, Linda and son Johnny. Their marriage lasted until his death in 1982.

=== Western movie actor ===
In 1939, Wakely made his screen debut (with the Jimmy Wakely Trio) in a Roy Rogers Western, Saga of Death Valley. In 1941, The Jimmy Wakely Trio appeared in Hopalong Cassidy films Twilight on the Trail and Stick to Your Guns, singing songs such as "Lonesome Guitar", "My Kind of Country", and "Twilight on the Trail". In the 1940s, Wakely groups provided songs and musical support for several B-western movies, including appearances with:

- the Range Busters at Monogram Pictures
- Don "Red" Barry at Republic Pictures
- Johnny Mack Brown and Tex Ritter at Universal Pictures
- Charles Starrett at Columbia Pictures

Wakely made only one film with Autry, Heart of the Rio Grande, at Republic in 1942. He was sometimes referred to as a low-budget Autry in films. His response was, "Everybody reminds somebody of someone else until they are somebody. And I had rather be compared to Gene Autry than anyone else. Through the grace of God and Gene Autry, I got a career." He appeared in 28 Westerns at Monogram between 1944 and 1949.

Wakely also appeared in some non-Westerns, including I'm from Arkansas in 1944, a showcase for country and hillbilly performers who bring their comedy, tunes and yodeling to Pitchfork, Arkansas.

=== Recording career ===
About 1941–1942, Decca gave Wakely a recording contract that ran until 1947. After leaving films, he continued to record, switching to the Capitol label. Though most of his songs were country Western, some crossed over to the pop charts, including collaborations with singer Margaret Whiting and Karen Chandler, and for the Christmas song "Silver Bells". He had a number one country hit with "One Has My Name (The Other Has My Heart)", a song originally released by Western singer Eddie Dean.

=== Comic books ===
Like other Western film stars of the era, Wakely had his own comic book series. DC Comics published 18 issues from Sept/Oct 1949–July/Aug 1952, billing him as "Hollywood's Sensational Cowboy Star!"

=== Radio and television appearances ===
In addition to Autry's Melody Ranch, Wakely had his own CBS Radio show and TV show. He also co-hosted other programs. He also made several appearances on television variety shows; and in 1961 he was one of five rotating hosts on the NBC-TV program Five Star Jubilee. Beginning September 11, 1950, he had a 30-minute disc jockey program on the ABC radio network. In addition to recorded music, the show featured "homespun humor, philosophy and interviews".

=== Recording company ===
In the 1960s and 1970s, Wakely developed Shasta Records and owned two music publishing companies. He converted part of his California ranch into a recording studio, producing recordings for himself as well as for other country Western performers, including Tex Williams, Merle Travis, Eddie Dean, Tex Ritter and Rex Allen. Wakely created a records by mail system for the Shasta label, becoming extremely successful despite lack of radio play. For his recording work, Wakely has a star on the Hollywood Walk of Fame on Vine Street.

=== Later years ===
Later in life, Wakely performed at the Grand Ole Opry and National Barn Dance. His nightclub act visited Las Vegas, Reno and other venues. He did a Christmas USO Tour with Bob Hope. He made a few recordings on the Coral, Decca/Vocalion and Dot labels. He made appearances at Western film nostalgia conventions and continued personal appearances and stage shows, often with his daughter Linda and son Johnny in the act.

=== Death ===
After contracting emphysema, Wakely died of heart failure at Mission Hills, California on September 23, 1982. He and his wife, who died in 1997, are interred next to each other in the Court of Remembrance at Forest Lawn Memorial Park (Hollywood Hills), Los Angeles, California.

=== Remembrance ===
Wakely's daughter, Linda, wrote a biography about Jimmy Wakely titled See Ya' Up There, Baby - The Jimmy Wakely Story

The family has established a YouTube channel entitled "The Jimmy Wakely Collection" to preserve and showcase footage and music featuring Jimmy Wakely.

== Awards and honors ==
Wakely was inducted into the Nashville Songwriters Hall of Fame in 1971, and the Western Music Association Hall of Fame in 1991.

He was awarded the "Western Life Achievement Award" by Tex Williams at the Hollywood Bowl, July 30, 1949.

== Discography ==
=== Albums ===
Year	Album	Label
1954	Songs of the West	Capitol
1954	Christmas on the Range	Capitol
1956	Santa Fe Trail	Decca
1957	Enter and Rest and Pray	Decca
1959	A Cowboy Serenade	Tops
1959	Country Million Sellers	Shasta
1959	Merry Christmas	Shasta
1960	Jimmy Wakely Sings	Shasta
1966	Slippin' Around	Dot
1966	Christmas with Jimmy Wakely	Dot
1967	I'll Never Slip Around Again	Hilltop
1969	Heartaches	Decca
1969	Here's Jimmy Wakely	Vocalion
1970	Big Country Songs	Vocalion
1970	Now and Then	Decca
1973	Blue Shadows	Coral

=== Selected singles ===
Year	Single	Chart Positions	
Year	Single	US Country	US
1943	"There's a Star-Spangled Banner Waving Somewhere"		14
1943	"Standing Outside of Heaven"		
1944	"I'm Sending You Red Roses"	2	
1946	"Somebody's Rose"		
1946	"Everyone Knew It But Me"		
1946	"One Little Teardrop Too Late"		
1948	"Signed Sealed and Delivered"	9	
1948	"One Has My Name (The Other Has My Heart)"	1	10
1948	"I Love You So Much It Hurts"	1	21
1948	"Mine All Mine"	8	
1949	"Forever More"	10	
1949	"Till the End of the World"	9	
1949	"I Wish I Had a Nickel"	4	
1949	"Someday You'll Call My Name"	10	
1949	"Tellin' My Troubles to My Old Guitar"	14	
1950	"Peter Cottontail" (c/w "Mr. Easter Bunny")	7	26
1950	"Mona Lisa" (c/w "Steppin' Out")	10	
1950	"Bandera Waltz" (c/w "Pot o' Cold")	—	
1952	"Love Song of the Waterfall" (c/w "Goodbye, Little Girl")	—	
1956	"The Call of the Canyon"		

=== Collaborations ===
Year	Single	Artist	Chart Positions	
Year	Single	Artist	US Country	US
1949	"Slippin' Around"	Margaret Whiting	1	1
1949	"Wedding Bells"	Margaret Whiting	6	30
1949	"I'll Never Slip Around Again"	Margaret Whiting	2	8
1950	"Broken Down Merry-Go-Round"	Margaret Whiting	2	12
1950	"The Gods Were Angry with Me"	Margaret Whiting	3	17
1950	"Let's Go to Church (Next Sunday Morning)"	Margaret Whiting	2	13
1950	"A Bushel and a Peck"	Margaret Whiting	6	6
1951	"My Heart Cries for You"	Les Baxter	7	12
1951	"Beautiful Brown Eyes"	Les Baxter	5	12
1951	"When You and I Were Young Maggie Blues"	Margaret Whiting	7	20
1951	"I Don't Want to Be Free"	Margaret Whiting	5	

== Filmography ==
=== Movies ===
This is a partial list of his movie credits, most of them are Westerns:

- Money, Women and Guns (1959)
- Arrow in the Dust (1954)
- The Marshal's Daughter (1953)
- Lawless Code (1949)
- Roaring Westward (1949)
- Brand of Fear (1949)
- Across the Rio Grande (1949)
- Gun Law Justice (1949)
- Gun Runner (1949)
- Courtin' Trouble (1948)
- Outlaw Brand (1948)
- Silver Trails (1948)
- Cowboy Cavalier (1948)
- Range Renegades (1948)
- Partners of the Sunset (1948)
- The Rangers Ride (1948)
- Oklahoma Blues (1948)
- Song of the Drifter (1948)
- Ridin' Down the Trail (1947)
- Song of the Wasteland (1947)
- Six-Gun Serenade (1947)
- Rainbow Over the Rockies (1947)
- Song of the Sierras (1946)
- Trail to Mexico (1946)
- West of the Alamo (1946)
- Moon Over Montana (1946)
- The Lonesome Trail (1945)
- Riders of the Dawn (1945)
- Saddle Serenade (1945)
- Springtime in Texas (1945)
- Montana Plains (1945)
- Rough Ridin' Justice (1945)
- Sagebrush Heroes (1945)
- Of the Range (1944)
- Git Along Little Pony (1944)
- Saddle Leather Law (1944)
- Song of the Range (1944)
- Cyclone Prairie Rangers (1944)
- I'm from Arkansas (1944)
- Cowboy from Lonesome River (1944)
- Swing in the Saddle (1944)
- Sundown Valley (1944)
- Cowboy Canteen (1944)
- Cowboy in the Clouds (1943)
- The Lone Star Trail (1943)
- Robin Hood of the Range (1943)
- Raiders of San Joaquin (1943)
- Cheyenne Roundup (1943)
- Tenting Tonight on the Old Camp Ground (1943)
- The Old Chisholm Trail (1942)
- Strictly in the Groove (1942)
- Little Joe, the Wrangler (1942)
- Deep in the Heart of Texas (1942)
- Come on Danger (1942)
- Heart of the Rio Grande (1942)
- Twilight on the Trail (1941)
- Stick to Your Guns (1941)
- Redskins and Redheads (1941)
- Bury Me Not on the Lone Prairie (1941)
- Six Lessons from Madame La Zonga (1941)
- Pony Post (1940)
- Texas Terrors (1940)
- Give Us Wings (1940)
- The Tulsa Kid (1940)
- Saga of Death Valley (1939)
- Ridin' Down the Trail (1939)

== Radio ==
- The Jimmy Wakely Show (1952–1958)
- Melody Ranch (1940–1942)
- CBS Hollywood Barn Dance (1945–1947)

== Television ==
Wakely appeared as himself on several TV shows including:

- The Jimmy Wakely TV Show(1950s)
- The Colgate Comedy Hour (1950)
- Toast of the Town (1951)
- Ozark Jubilee (ABC, 1956–58, 60)
- Country Hoedown (late 1950s, syndicated) sponsored by US Navy Recruiting
- Five Star Jubilee (NBC, 1961)
- Here's Hollywood (1961)

== Bibliography ==
- Seemann, Charlie (1998). "Jimmy Wakely". In The Encyclopedia of Country Music. Paul Kingsbury, Editor. New York: Oxford University Press. p. 566. ISBN 978-0195176087
