= Origins of the blues =

Little is known about the exact origin of the music now known as the blues. No specific year can be cited as its origin, largely because the style evolved over a long period but blues is inarguably a Black American art form as it is noted "it is impossible to say exactly how old blues is - certainly no older than the presence of black people in the United States. It is native American Music, the product of the Black in this Country or to put it more exactly the way I have come to think about it, blues could not exist if African Captives had not become American Captives". Ethnomusicologist Gerhard Kubik traces the roots of many of the elements that were to develop into the blues back to the African continent, the "cradle of the blues". One important early mention of something closely resembling the blues comes from 1901, when an archaeologist in Mississippi described the songs of black workers which had lyrical themes and technical elements in common with the blues.

== Precursive African elements of Black American blues ==
Blues historians such as Paul Oliver and Samuel Charters have suggested that the essential elements of the blues originated in the Sahel region of West Africa, brought over by Africans via the slave trade. Whereas the African Slaves brought to South America and the Caribbean were largely from Percussion based cultures in southern coastal west Africa (like southern Nigeria), central Africa and Bantu speaking parts of Africa lacking in many elements that created the blues, many of the slaves brought to North America were from the Sahel region and much more Familiar with stringed instruments basing the Banjo on string instruments from the Sahel like Akonting, Charters found that many Sahelian slaves were from Muslim cultures and favored stringed, melodic, and solo singing, which differed from the drum-based music of other African regions. These traditions, which were sometimes permitted by plantation owners who feared drums as tool of rebellion and thus evolved into the blues.

Blue note a hallmark of blues music and Rhythm and blues characterised by flattened thirds, fifths, or sevenths—has deep roots in the musical traditions of The Sahel region, making African American popular music like the blues having a Sahelian based origin in contrast to the more percussion based Afro-Brazilian music and Afro-Cuban music which have more of a southern coastal west African, Central African and Bantu influence where the blue note is absent. The Griot tradition of the Sahel also may have influenced Talking blues and by extension Hip hop,.

There are few characteristics common to all blues, as the genre takes its shape from the distinctive attributes of each individual performance. Some characteristics, however, were present prior to the creation of the modern blues, and are common to most styles of African American music. The earliest blues-like music was a "functional expression, rendered in a call-and-response style without accompaniment or harmony and unbounded by the formality of any particular musical structure". This pre-blues music was adapted from the field shouts and hollers performed during slave times, expanded into "simple solo songs laden with emotional content".

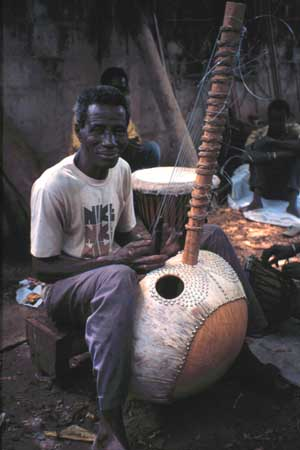
Master Kora maker Alieu Suso in the Gambia

Many of these blues elements, such as the call-and-response format, can be traced back to the music of Africa. The use of melisma and a wavy, nasal intonation also suggests a connection between the music of Sahelian West Africa and the blues. The belief that blues is historically derived from the West African music including from Mali is reflected in Martin Scorsese’s often quoted characterization of Ali Farka Touré’s tradition as constituting "the DNA of the blues".

Perhaps the most compelling African instrument that is a predecessor to an African-American instrument is the "Akonting", a folk lute of the Jola tribe of Senegambia. It is a clear predecessor to the American banjo in its playing style, the construction of the instrument itself and in its social role as a folk instrument. The Kora is played by a professional caste of praise singers for the rich and aristocracy (called griots or jalis) and is not considered folk music. Jola music may not have been influenced much by North African/Middle Eastern music. The music of the Akonting and that played by on the banjo by elder African-American banjo players, even into the mid 20th century is easily identified as being very similar. The akonting is perhaps the most important and concrete link that exists between African and African-American music.

While the findings of Kubik and others clearly attest to the essential Africanness of many essential aspects of blues expression, studies by Willie Ruff and others have situated the origin of "black" spiritual music inside enslaved peoples' exposure to their masters' Hebridean-originated gospels. Additionally, there are theories that the four-beats-per-measure structure of the blues might share its origins with the Native American tradition of pow wow drumming.

== Other African influence ==
The historian Sylviane Diouf and ethnomusicologist Gerhard Kubik identify Islamic music as an influence on blues music. Diouf notes a striking resemblance between the Islamic call to prayer (originating from Bilal ibn Rabah, a famous Abyssinian African Muslim in the early 7th century) and 19th-century field holler music, noting that both have similar lyrics praising God, melody, note changes, "words that seem to quiver and shake" in the vocal chords, dramatic changes in musical scales, and nasal intonation. She attributes the origins of field holler music to African Muslim slaves who accounted for an estimated 30% of African slaves in America. According to Kubik, "the vocal style of many blues singers using melisma, wavy intonation, and so forth is a heritage of that large region of West Africa that had been in contact with the Islamic world via the Maghreb since the seventh and eighth centuries." There was particularly a significant trans-Saharan cross-fertilization between the musical traditions of the Maghreb and the Sahel. Many of the elements that characterise early blues such as the blues Pentatonic scale, "Blue Notes" and Pitch Instability Declamatory and Melismatic Vocals can be found not just in the West African Sahel but all the way in the eastern Sahel in Sudan suggesting cross fertilisation along the Sahel. The blues with its origin in the American South has likely evolved as a fusion of an African just intonation scale with European 12-tone musical instruments and harmony.

There was a difference in the music performed by the predominantly Muslim Sahelian slaves and the predominantly non-Muslim slaves from coastal West Africa and Central Africa. The Sahelian Muslim slaves generally favoured wind and string instruments and melismatic solo singing, whereas the non-Muslim slaves generally favored drums and group chants. Plantation owners who feared revolt outlawed drums and group chants, but allowed the Sahelian slaves to continue singing and playing their wind and string instruments, which the plantation owners found less threatening. Among the instruments introduced by Muslim African slaves were ancestors of the banjo. While many were pressured to convert to Christianity, the Sahelian slaves were allowed to maintain their musical traditions, adapting their skills to instruments such as the fiddle and guitar. Some were also allowed to perform at balls for slave-holders, allowing the migration of their music across the Deep South.

== Influence of field hollers ==
Field holler music, also known as Levee Camp Holler music, was an early form of African American music, described in the 19th century. Field hollers laid the foundations for the blues, spirituals, and eventually rhythm and blues. Field hollers, cries and hollers of the slaves and later sharecroppers working in cotton fields, prison chain gangs, railway gangs (Gandy dancers) or turpentine camps were the precursor to the call and response of African American spirituals and gospel music, to jug bands, minstrel shows, stride piano, and ultimately to the blues, rhythm and blues, jazz and African American music in general. Sylviane Diouf and Gerhard Kubik have traced the origins of field hollers to African Muslim slaves, who were influenced by the Islamic musical tradition of West Africa (see African roots above).

== Influence of spirituals ==
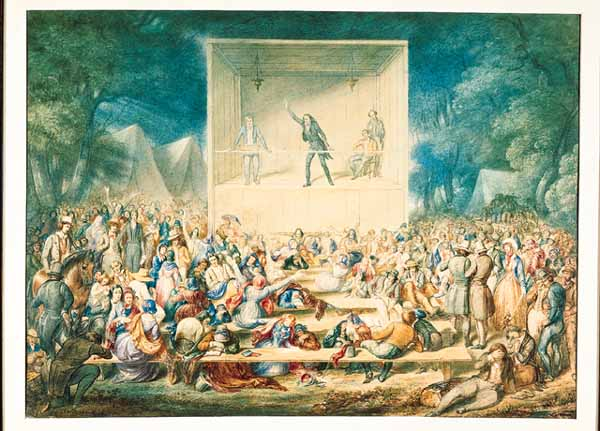
A watercolor painting of a camp meeting circa 1839 (New Bedford Whaling Museum).

The most important American antecedent of the blues was the spiritual, a form of religious song with its roots in the camp meetings of the Great Awakening of the early 19th century. Spirituals were a passionate song form, that "convey(ed) to listeners the same feeling of rootlessness and misery" as the blues. Spirituals, however, were less specifically concerning the performer, instead about the general loneliness of mankind, and were more figurative than direct in their lyrics. Despite these differences, the two forms are similar enough that they can not be easily separated — many spirituals would probably have been called blues had that word been in wide use at the time.

== Influence of Hawaiian guitar ==
In the early 20th century, Hawaiian music was the most popular music in America, and many Hawaiian musicians toured the deep south, where they popularized the lap steel guitar. Early blues musicians such as Son House referred to the slide style of playing as the Hawaiian way of playing. Blues slide guitarist Tampa Red described using a bottleneck as a slide as a "Hawaiian effect".

== Social and economic aspects ==
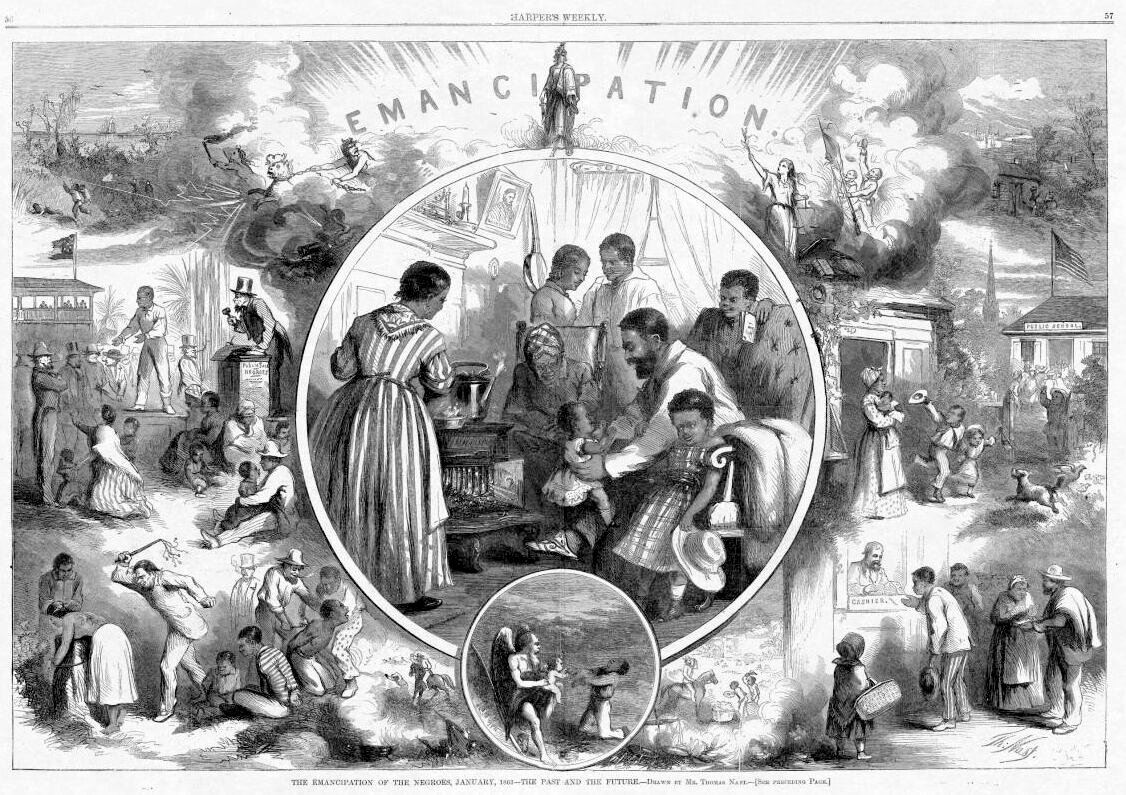
Emancipation from Freedmen's viewpoint; illustration from Harper's Weekly 1865

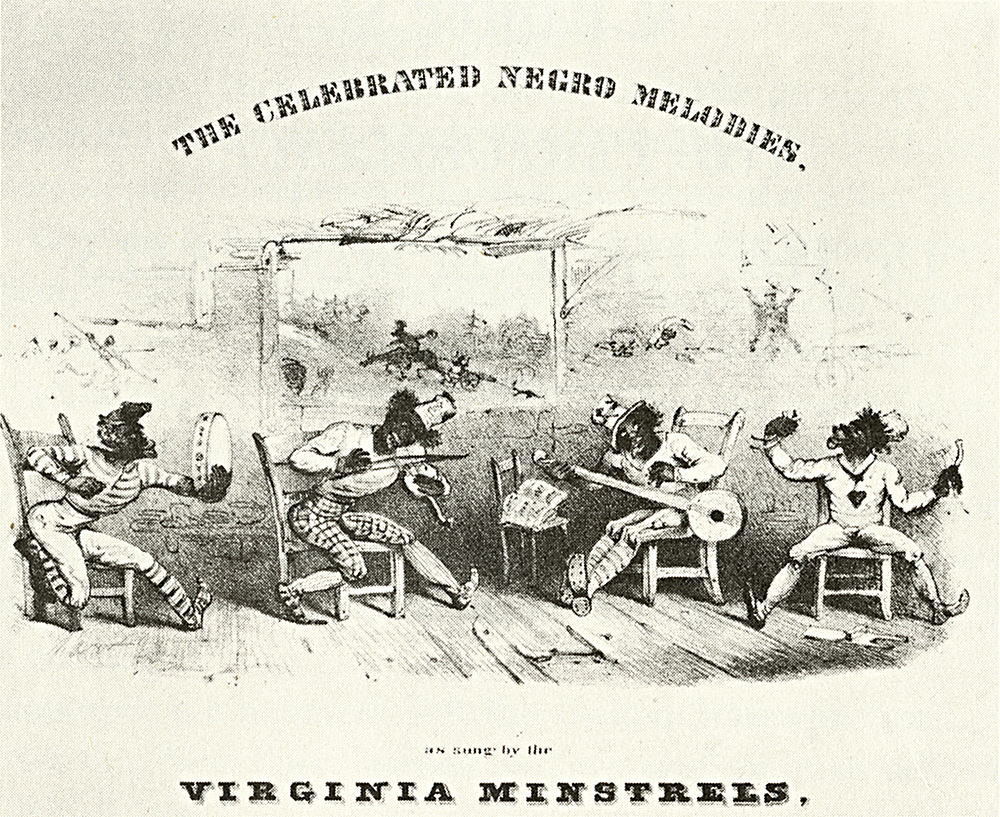
Detail from cover of The Celebrated Negro Melodies, as Sung by the Virginia Minstrels, 1843

The social and economic reasons for the appearance of the blues are not fully known. Blues has evolved from an unaccompanied vocal music of poor black laborers into a wide variety of styles and subgenres, with regional variations across the United States. African American work songs were an important precursor to the modern blues; these included the songs sung by laborers like stevedores and roustabouts, and the field hollers and "shouts" of slaves. The first appearance of the blues is not well defined and is often dated between 1870 and 1900, a period that coincides with the emancipation of the slaves and the transition from slavery to sharecropping and small-scale agricultural production in the southern United States.

Several scholars characterize the early 1900s development of blues music as a move from group performances to a more individualized style. They argue that the development of the blues is associated with the newly acquired freedom of the slaves. According to Lawrence Levine, "there was a direct relationship between the national ideological emphasis upon the individual, the popularity of Booker T. Washington's teachings, and the rise of the blues." Levine states that "psychologically, socially, and economically, Negroes were being acculturated in a way that would have been impossible during slavery, and it is hardly surprising that their secular music reflected this as much as their religious music did."

An important reason for the lack of certain knowledge about the origins of the blues is the earliest blues musicians' tendency to wander through communities, leaving little or no record of precisely what sort of music they played or where it came from. Blues was generally regarded as lower-class music, unfit for documentation, study or enjoyment by the upper- and middle-classes

== Blues around 1900 ==
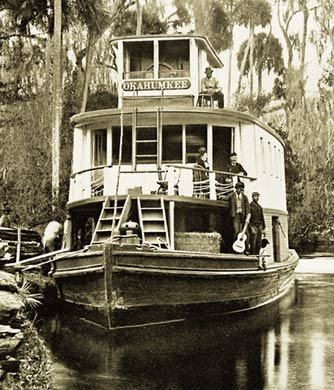
An 1890s photo of the tourist steamer Okahumke'e on the Ocklawaha River, with black guitarists on board

Blue notes pre-date their use in blues. English composer Samuel Coleridge-Taylor's "A Negro Love Song", from his The African Suite for Piano composed in 1898, contains blue third and seventh notes.

African American composer W. C. Handy wrote in his autobiography of the experience of sleeping on a train traveling through (or stopping at the station of) Tutwiler, Mississippi around 1903, and being awakened by:

... a lean, loose-jointed Negro who had commenced plucking a guitar beside me while I slept. His clothes were rags; his feet peeped out of his shoes. His face had on it some of the sadness of the ages. As he played, he pressed a knife on the strings in a manner popularized by Hawaiian guitarists who used steel bars. ... The effect was unforgettable. His song, too, struck me instantly... The singer repeated the line ("Going' where the Southern cross' the Dog") three times, accompanying himself on the guitar with the weirdest music I had ever heard.

Handy had mixed feelings about this music, which he regarded as rather primitive and monotonous, but he used the "Southern cross' the Dog" line in his 1914 "Yellow Dog Rag", which he retitled "Yellow Dog Blues" after the term blues became popular. "Yellow Dog" was the nickname of the Yazoo and Mississippi Valley Railroad.

Blues later adopted elements from the "Ethiopian (here, meaning "black") airs" of minstrel shows and Negro spirituals, including instrumental and harmonic accompaniment. The style also was closely related to ragtime, which developed at about the same time, though the blues better preserved "the original melodic patterns of African music".

Since the 1890s, the American sheet music publishing industry had produced a great deal of ragtime music. The first published ragtime song to include a 12-bar section was "One o' Them Things!" in 1904. Written by James Chapman and Leroy Smith, it was published in St. Louis, Missouri, by Jos. Plachet and Son. Another early rag/blues mix was "I Got the Blues" published in 1908 by Antonio Maggio of New Orleans

In a long interview conducted by Alan Lomax in 1938, Jelly Roll Morton recalled that the first blues he had heard, probably around 1900, was played by a singer and prostitute, Mamie Desdunes, in Garden District, New Orleans. Morton sang the blues: "Can’t give me a dollar, give me a lousy dime/ You can’t give me a dollar, give me a lousy dime/ Just to feed that hungry man of mine". The interview was released as The Complete Library of Congress Recordings.

== Continued development of the blues in the 1910s ==
In 1912, the sheet music industry published another blues composition—"Dallas Blues" by Hart A. Wand of Oklahoma City, Oklahoma. Two other blues-like compositions, precipitating the Tin Pan Alley adoption of blues elements, were also published in 1912: "Baby Seals' Blues" by Baby Franklin Seals (arranged by Artie Matthews) and "Memphis Blues", another ragtime arrangement with a single 12-bar section, by W. C. Handy. Also in 1912 (on November 9), another song, "Nigger Blues", was copyrighted by Lee "Lasses" White, but not actually published until 1913.

Handy was a formally trained musician, composer and arranger who helped to popularize the blues by transcribing and orchestrating blues in an almost symphonic style, with bands and singers. He became a popular and prolific composer, and billed himself as the "Father of the Blues"; however, his compositions can be described as a fusion of blues with ragtime and jazz, a merger facilitated using the Afro-Cuban habanera rhythm that had long been a part of ragtime; Handy's signature work was "Saint Louis Blues".

Songs from this period had many different structures. A testimony of those times can be found for instance in Henry Thomas's recordings. However, the twelve-, eight-bar, or sixteen-bar structure based on tonic, subdominant and dominant chords became the most common. Melodically, blues music is marked by the use of the lowered third and dominant seventh (so-called blue notes) of the associated major scale. The standard 12-bar blues form is noted in uncorroborated oral histories as appearing communities throughout the region along the lower Mississippi River during the decade of the 1900s (and performed in New Orleans at least since 1908). One of these early sites of blues evolution was along Beale Street in Memphis, Tennessee. However, author Eileen Southern has pointed out several contrasting statements by old-time musicians. She cites Eubie Blake as saying "Blues in Baltimore? Why, Baltimore is the blues!" and Bunk Johnson as claiming that the blues was around in his childhood, in the 1880s.

== Growth of the blues (1920s onward) ==
One of the first professional blues singers was Gertrude "Ma" Rainey, who claimed to have coined the term blues. Classic female urban or vaudeville blues singers were popular in the 1920s, among them Mamie Smith, Ma Rainey, Bessie Smith, and Victoria Spivey. Mamie Smith, more a vaudeville performer than a blues artist, was the first African-American to record a blues in 1920; her "Crazy Blues" sold over 75,000 copies in its first month.

The musical forms and styles that are now considered the "blues" as well as modern "country music" arose in the same regions during the nineteenth century in the southern United States. Recorded blues and country can be found from as far back as the 1920s, when the popular record industry developed and created marketing categories called "race music" and "hillbilly music" to sell music by blacks for blacks and by whites for whites respectively. At the time, there was no clear musical division between "blues" and "country", except for the race of the performer, and even that sometimes was documented incorrectly by record companies.
