= George O'Connor =

George O'Connor may refer to:

- George O'Connor (singer) (1874–1946), American singer and lawyer
- George O'Connor (hurler) (born 1959), retired Irish hurler
- George O'Connor (comics) (born 1973), American author, cartoonist and illustrator
- George O'Connor (footballer) (1892–1921), Australian rules footballer
- George G. O'Connor (1914–1971), U.S. Army general
- George Bligh O'Connor, Canadian lawyer and judge

== See also ==
- George Connor (disambiguation)
