= The Lonesome Trail =

The Lonesome Trail may refer to:

- The Lonesome Trail (1930 film), an American western film directed by Bruce Mitchell
- The Lonesome Trail (1945 film), an American western film directed by Oliver Drake
- The Lonesome Trail (1955 film), an American western film directed by Richard Bartlett
