= Dorothy Ford =

American actress and model (1922–2010)

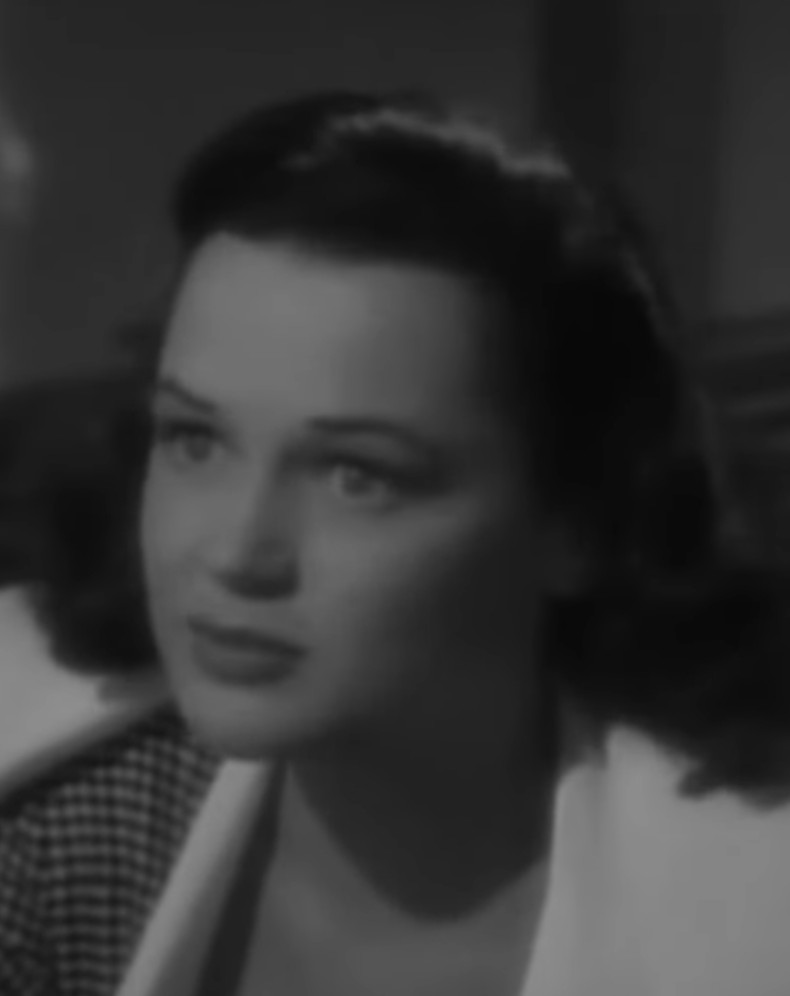
- Ford in Love Laughs at Andy Hardy (1946)
- Born: April 4, 1922
- Died: October 15, 2010 (aged 88)
- Occupations: Actress and Model
- Years active: 1943–1966
- Height: 6 ft 2 in (1.88 m)
- Spouse(s): James Sterlin (m. 1949; ann. 1949) Thomas B. Chambers (m. 1952; div. 1954) Mike Ragan (m. 1965; died 1995)

Dorothy Ford (April 4, 1922 – October 15, 2010) was an American actress and model active from the 1940s through the 1960s.

== Career ==
She began her career as a model, largely owing to her height of 6 feet 2 inches (188 cm) and a 38-26-38 1/2 figure. She went on to be the first woman signed by showman Billy Rose for the swimming chorus in his Aquacade at the Golden Gate International Exposition in San Francisco. She studied at the Actors' Laboratory Theatre. After seven months with the Aquacade, she became a showgirl at Earl Carroll's, where she worked for a year and a half.

In 1944, she made her screen debut in Lady in the Dark. She continued her acting career, including roles in the Andy Hardy movie Love Laughs at Andy Hardy (1946) and in Abbott and Costello's Jack and the Beanstalk (1952). She appeared in 39 movies from 1943 to 1962.

== Personal life ==
Ford and James Sterling wed in Las Vegas in April 1949. The marriage was annulled two months later. On April 23, 1952, she married Tommy Chambers, a tennis player. She had a miscarriage the next year and divorced. Her third and final husband was Hollis Bane, an actor who was also billed as Mike Ragan. They remained married until his death.

== Partial filmography ==
- Thousands Cheer (1943) - Dancer in Don Liper Number / Bathing Beauty in Red Skelton Skit (uncredited)
- Lady in the Dark (1944) - Model (uncredited)
- Broadway Rhythm (1944) - Co-ed in Drugstore (uncredited)
- Two Girls and a Sailor (1944) - Hotel Guest (uncredited)
- Meet the People (1944) - Tall Girl (uncredited)
- Bathing Beauty (1944) - Dorothy (uncredited)
- The Thin Man Goes Home (1944) - Tall Girl with Dog (uncredited)
- Here Come the Co-Eds (1945) - Bertha (uncredited)
- The Picture of Dorian Gray (1945) - Tall Chorine (uncredited)
- Thrill of a Romance (1945) - Hotel Guest (uncredited)
- Ten Cents a Dance (1945) - Hat Check Girl
- Nob Hill (1945) - Tall Showgirl in Sally's Act (uncredited)
- Lover Come Back (1946) - Tall Brunette (uncredited)
- Love Laughs at Andy Hardy (1946) - Coffy Smith
- On Our Merry Way (1948) - Lola Maxim
- 3 Godfathers (1948) - Ruby Latham
- One Sunday Afternoon (1948) - Daisy (uncredited)
- Sands of Iwo Jima (1949) - Tall Girl (uncredited)
- Key to the City (1950) - Miss Construction (uncredited)
- Let's Go Navy! (1951) - Kitten
- Flame of Araby (1951) - Naja (uncredited)
- Jack and the Beanstalk (1952) - Receptionist / Polly
- Feudin' Fools (1952) - Tiny Smith
- Limelight (1952) - Patrician Lady in Dress Circle (uncredited)
- A Perilous Journey (1953) - Rose
- The High and the Mighty (1954) - Mrs. Wilson (uncredited)
- The Seven Year Itch (1955) - Indian Girl / Tall Beauty at Train Station (uncredited)
- Indestructible Man (1956) - Tall Stripper (uncredited)
- Pardners (1956) - Amanda Wentworth (uncredited)
- Beyond a Reasonable Doubt (1956) - Tall Burlesque Blonde (uncredited)
- Gun Brothers (1956) - Molly MacLain
- Pagan Island (1961) - Pagan Woman
