= St. John's Academy (Alexandria, Virginia) =

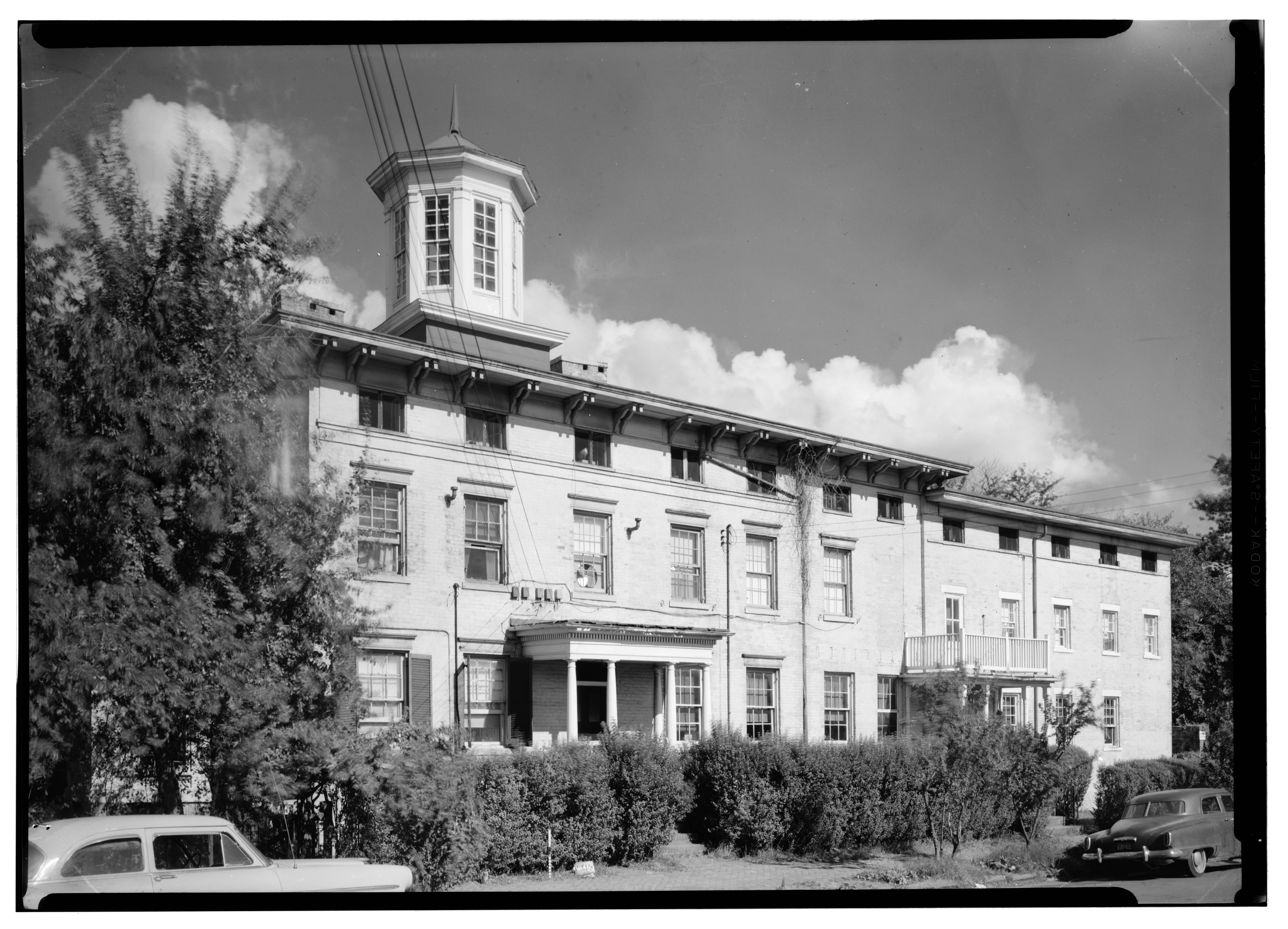
- St. John's Academy (Duke & South Columbus St.)

Location
- Duke & South Columbus Street; Alexandria, Virginia; United States

Information
- Other name: St. John's Military Academy
- Motto: Pro deo et pro patria (for God and country)
- Religious affiliation: Roman Catholic (Jesuit)
- Established: September 8, 1833
- Founder: Rev. John Smith, S.J. William F. Carne; Richard L. Carne
- Status: Closed
- Closed: 1895

St. John's Academy was a military academy for boys in Alexandria, Virginia established by Jesuits.

== History ==
St. John's Academy was established on September 8, 1833 on Prince Street in Alexandria, Virginia by brothers William F. Carne and Richard L. Carne, along with Reverend John Smith, S.J. and other Jesuits. In 1834, it moved to 57 South Royal Street, on the corner of Duke and South Royal Streets.

In 1841, St. John's shut down. In 1847, the school reopened under the leadership of Richard Libbey Carne Jr. (1826–1911). In the 1850s, a primary school was added to the Academy. Carne, the son of founder Richard L. Carne and previous student of St. John's, would serve as its principal for 45 years.

The Academy initially had a reduction in students during the Civil War, but the number enrolled steadily increased to 154 in the 1863–64 school year. On March 29, 1870, an act of the Virginia General Assembly allowed for the state to loan arms to the Academy for students to drill as a volunteer militia.

Starting in 1871, due to competition with state and endowed schools, St. John's started to see reduced enrollment. In 1884, St. John's moved to the corner of Duke & South Columbus Street on the site of a school operated by Caleb Hallowell, a nephew of Benjamin Hallowell. By 1892, more than 1,500 students had attended St. John's. In September 1892, Richard L. Carne turned over St. John's to William H. Sweeney. St. John's was incorporated in 1894. St. John's closed in late 1895, before its charter was issued.

In 1981, the building was converted into condominiums.

=== St. John's Cadets ===
In September 1869, the St. John's Cadets were organized. They were known to attend local Alexandria and Washington, D.C. parades. The Cadets participated in a number of special events, including the Centennial Exposition in 1876, Yorktown Centennial in 1881, Washington Monument Dedication in 1885, and the first inauguration of Grover Cleveland in 1885.

=== Principals ===
- 1833–1837 – Rev. John Smith, S.J.
- 1837–1839 – Stephen L. Dubuisson, S.J.
- 1839–18?? – John H. Kellenberger
- 18??–1841 – Hugh C. McLaughlin
- 1847–1892 – Richard L. Carne Jr.
- 1892–1895 – William H. Sweeney
- 1895 – J. M. Vianney Ficklin

== Notable alumni ==
- Richard Henry Lee Chichester (1870–1930), judge
- William Whitney Christmas (1865–1960), physician, aviator and supposed con man
- Lawrence W. Corbett (1859–1897), member of the Virginia House of Delegates
- Louis A. Cuvillier (1871–1935), lawyer and New York state politician
- George O'Connor (1874–1946), lawyer, businessman and singer; attended 1888-1891
