= Feudin' Fools =

1952 film by William Beaudine

- Directed by: William Beaudine
- Written by: Tim Ryan; Bert Lawrence
- Produced by: Jerry Thomas
- Starring: Leo Gorcey; Huntz Hall; David Gorcey; Bernard Gorcey
- Cinematography: Marcel LePicard
- Edited by: William Austin
- Music by: Edward J. Kay
- Production company: Monogram Pictures
- Distributed by: Monogram Pictures
- Release date: September 21, 1952 (U.S.)
- Running time: 63 minutes
- Country: United States
- Language: English

Feudin' Fools is a 1952 American comedy film directed by William Beaudine and starring the Bowery Boys, Anne Kimbell and Dorothy Ford. The film is the 27th in the Bowery Boys series.

== Plot ==
Sach Jones inherits a farm but discovers that the Smiths, a rival family, are enemies of the Joneses. However, Sach conceals his identity and befriends several of the Smiths. A gang of bank robbers arrives and hides in Saul's house. The Smiths mistake the thieves for Jones family members and begin shooting at them. The authorities capture the criminals, but Slip accidentally says that he is Mr. Jones and the Smiths direct their fire toward him.

== Cast ==
=== The Bowery Boys ===
- Leo Gorcey as Terrance Aloysius "Slip" Mahoney
- Huntz Hall as Horace Debussy "Sach" Jones
- David Gorcey as Chuck (as David Condon)
- Bennie Bartlett as Butch

=== Remaining cast ===
- Bernard Gorcey as Louie Dumbrowski
- Anne Kimbell as Ellie Mae Smith
- Dorothy Ford as Tiny Smith
- Paul Wexler as Luke Smith
- Robert Easton as Caleb Smith
- Lyle Talbot as Big Jim

== Production ==
Feudin' Fools is the first Bowery Boys film in which the gang consists of only four members, a size at which it would remain for the remainder of the film series.

== Home media ==
Warner Archives released the film on made-to-order DVD as part of The Bowery Boys, Volume Three set on October 1, 2013.

Preceded by Here Come the Marines; 1952	'The Bowery Boys' movies 1946-1958	Succeeded by No Holds Barred; 1952
