= George O'Connor (singer) =

American singer

- Born: George Henry O'Connor; August 20, 1874; Washington, D.C., U.S.
- Died: September 28, 1946 (aged 72); Washington, D.C., U.S.
- Occupation(s): Lawyer, businessman, singer
- Years active: 1894–1946

George Henry O'Connor (August 20, 1874 – September 28, 1946) was an American lawyer, businessman and singer, described at the time of his death as "almost beyond a doubt the most popular man in Washington".

== Biography ==
O'Connor was born in Washington, D.C. He attended St. John's Military Academy in Alexandria, Virginia, graduating in 1891, and then studied at the National University School of Law, graduating in 1894. He continued his studies at Georgetown University, and was admitted to the District of Columbia Bar in 1895. He was employed by the District of Columbia Title Insurance Company, becoming its vice-president in 1907 and then its president from 1941 until his death. He was admitted to the bar of the Supreme Court in 1918.

At the same time as his legal career, he became a leading stage entertainer and recording artist. Aged nine, in 1883, he was mentioned in the local press as a performer in a "juvenile masque carnival", and while at Georgetown was a leading member of the glee club. By 1900, he had begun performing newly-fashionable "rag-time" music, and formed the Birenomore Quartette with three friends. O'Connor became a popular entertainer at events hosted by such organizations as the Gridiron Club, the National Press Club, the Alfalfa Club, the Knights of Columbus, and the Bar Association.

He also recorded prolifically as a tenor singer between 1914 and 1918, specializing in dialect material, particularly "coon songs", as well as other popular songs and light opera. His July 1916 recording of "Nigger Blues", copyrighted four years earlier by Leroy "Lasses" White, is one of the first recordings of a twelve-bar blues song. His other successful recordings included "Everybody Rag With Me" (1915) and "Pray For the Lights to Go Out" (1917).

O'Connor was the favored entertainer of a succession of US Presidents, from Taft to Truman, particularly at White House Correspondents' Association dinners, and became known as the "Troubadour to the Presidents".

He died in 1946, aged 72, of a heart ailment.
