= On Our Merry Way =

1948 film by King Vidor, Leslie Fenton

- 1948 Theatrical Poster
- Directed by: Leslie Fenton; King Vidor
- Written by: John O'Hara
- Screenplay by: Laurence Stallings; Lou Breslow
- Story by: Arch Oboler
- Produced by: Benedict Bogeaus; Burgess Meredith
- Starring: Paulette Goddard; Burgess Meredith; James Stewart; Henry Fonda; Dorothy Lamour; Victor Moore; Fred MacMurray; William Demarest; Hugh Herbert; Eduardo Ciannelli; Charles D. Brown; Dorothy Ford; Carl Switzer; Eilene Janssen; Betty Caldwell; Frank Moran; David Whorf
- Cinematography: Gordon Avil; Joseph F. Biroc; Edward Cronjager; John F. Seitz
- Edited by: James Smith
- Music by: Heinz Roemheld
- Production company: Benedict Bogeaus Productions
- Distributed by: United Artists
- Release dates: February 3, 1948 (New York City, New York); June 1948 (United States)
- Running time: 107 minutes
- Country: United States
- Language: English
- Box office: $1,550,000 (US rentals)

On Our Merry Way is a 1948 American comedy film produced by Benedict Bogeaus and Burgess Meredith and released by United Artists. At the time of its release, King Vidor and Leslie Fenton were credited with its direction, although the DVD lists John Huston and George Stevens, who assisted with one of the segments, as well. The screenplay by Laurence Stallings and Lou Breslow, based on an original story by Arch Oboler, is similar in style to that of Tales of Manhattan (1942), another anthology film made up of several vignettes linked by a single theme. The picture stars Paulette Goddard, Burgess Meredith, James Stewart, Henry Fonda, Harry James, Dorothy Lamour, Victor Moore and Fred MacMurray. It marks the first joint movie appearance of Stewart and Fonda, who play a pair of musicians in their section of the film.

== Plot ==
Oliver Pease has deceived his bride Martha into believing he's an inquiring reporter for the Los Angeles Daily Banner when, in fact, he is employed there as a classified ads clerk. When Martha suggests Oliver ask people on the street, "What influence has a baby had on your life?," he submits the question to the real reporter, who dismisses it outright. Oliver approaches the editor and introduces himself as a representative of the publisher, who he claims wants to improve the feature by having Oliver roam the city and ask the question suggested by his wife.

Jazz musicians Slim and Lank mistake the word "baby" for "babe" and reminisce about a female trumpeter they met when their tour bus broke down in a rundown California seaside resort, where they tried to fix a talent contest so the mayor's son would win.

Hollywood film star Gloria Manners recalls the time she was hired to work with precocious child star Peggy Thorndyke, who unintentionally triggered her big break in the movies, transforming her from a drab Iowa secretary into a Polynesian goddess.

In a story similar to the O. Henry short story "The Ransom of Red Chief", successful stage magician Al relates how he and his buddy Floyd once were con artists who stumbled upon young runaway and practical joker Edgar Hobbs in the woods. Upon learning he lived with his wealthy banker uncle, they conspired to return the boy and claim a reward, only to discover his uncle did not want him back. All ended well when Al married Edgar's sister and made the two siblings part of his magic act.

At the end of the day, Oliver returns to the newspaper only to discover he's been fired from his real job for being AWOL. When he tells his wife what happened, she surprises him by telling him she knew about his job and doesn’t mind. The paper's editor, impressed by the notes Oliver made while talking to his various subjects, arrives to tell him he likes his column and plans to print it, and asks how he thought of the question in the first place. Martha confesses it came to her because she's going to have a baby.

== Cast ==
- Paulette Goddard as Martha Pease
- Burgess Meredith as Oliver H. Pease
- James Stewart as Slim
- Henry Fonda as Lank Solsky
- Harry James as Harry James
- Dorothy Lamour as Gloria Manners
- Victor Moore as Ashton Carrington
- Fred MacMurray as Al
- William Demarest as Floyd
- Hugh Herbert as Eli Hobbs
- Charles D. Brown as Mr Sadd
- Eduardo Ciannelli as Maxim
- Betty Caldwell as Cynthia Roobs
- Dorothy Ford as Lola Maxim
- Eilene Janssen as Peggy Thorndyke
- Frank Moran as Bookie
- Carl Switzer as Leopold "Zoot" Wirtz
- David Whorf as Edgar Hobbs, aka Sniffles Dugan

== Production notes ==
The film's original title A Miracle Can Happen was inspired by a segment that was deleted from the film prior to its national release. In it, Charles Laughton portrayed a minister who is asked by a young boy to pay a visit to his dying father (Henry Hull). In an effort to boost the man's spirits, the minister offers an overly dramatic rendition of the Biblical story of David and Saul that sparks the man's full recovery. Only then does the minister learn the boy who had asked for his help actually had died years earlier. Producer Benedict Bogeaus thought the story was too serious for the otherwise comic film and replaced it with the Gloria Manners (Lamour) episode. According to co-producer/star Burgess Meredith, he showed the footage to David O. Selznick, who offered $500,000 for it with the idea he would release it as a short, but Bogeaus refused and the sequence was destroyed. Nonetheless prints of the film under its original title and with the Charles Laughton sequence intact are extant in European sources.

The film opened as A Miracle Can Happen in New York City, Philadelphia, and Detroit in February 1948. Reviews were dismal—the New York Daily News described it as "a million dollar cast in a ten-cent film"—and it was pulled from release. Public polls revealed most people thought the movie had a religious theme, so after the Charles Laughton episode had been removed and replaced by one with Dorothy Lamour, nine minutes thus being trimmed from the running time, it re-opened in June and was nationally released as On Our Merry Way, accompanied by an advertising campaign that emphasized it was a comedy.

This was the first joint film appearance of lifelong best friends James Stewart and Henry Fonda, although the picture seems to have been completely forgotten in the publicity for their two subsequent movies together a couple of decades later, titled Firecreek (1968) and The Cheyenne Social Club (1970).

Dorothy Lamour spoofed her tropical screen image singing "Queen of the Hollywood Islands," with Frank Loesser providing the music and lyrics.

The song "Baby Made a Change in Me" was written by Skitch Henderson and Donald Kahn.

At the time of filming, Burgess Meredith and Paulette Goddard were married, which may explain why they were permitted to be shown sleeping in the same bed, which was normally forbidden by the Production Code.

== Critical reception ==
In his review in The New York Times, Bosley Crowther said, "Apparently all the actors had themselves a wonderful time clowning around . . . this is one of those multi-episode pictures in which a dozen or so familiar names are turned loose in comedy sketches and permitted to let themselves go — a simple temptation which few actors would do anything drastic to resist. In this particular instance, the pleasure of the actors seems to be a great deal more satisfying than that which the audience can expect."

The Variety critic stated, "The cast couldn't have been better. The story's execution falters because a scene here and there is inclined to strive too much for its whimsical effect. But Meredith responds capitally to the mood of the character he plays, being given more of a chance to do so than any of the other stars."
