= Mississippi Rhythm =

- Theatrical release poster
- Directed by: Derwin Abrahams
- Screenplay by: Gretchen Darling
- Story by: Louise Rousseau
- Produced by: Lindsley Parsons
- Starring: Jimmie Davis; Veda Ann Borg; Lee White; Sue England; James Flavin; Paul Maxey
- Cinematography: William A. Sickner
- Edited by: Ace Herman; Otho Lovering
- Production company: Monogram Pictures
- Distributed by: Monogram Pictures
- Release date: May 29, 1949
- Running time: 68 minutes
- Country: United States
- Language: English

Mississippi Rhythm is a 1949 American musical film directed by Derwin Abrahams and written by Gretchen Darling. The film stars Jimmie Davis, Veda Ann Borg, Lee White, Sue England, James Flavin and Paul Maxey. The film was released on May 29, 1949, by Monogram Pictures.

== Plot ==
On board a riverboat bound for Creek City, singer Jimmie Davis, who is going to become half-owner of a land development company willed to him by his uncle, shares a cabin with traveling salesman Dixie Dalrymple. After Dixie invites Jimmie to perform in a concert he is putting on for the other passengers, Jimmie is persuaded to participate in a crooked card game run by Judge Homer Kenworthy and his associates. However, with Dixie's intervention, Jimmie wins handsomely, then accuses the gamblers of trying to cheat him.

== Cast ==
- Jimmie Davis as Jimmie Davis
- Veda Ann Borg as Jeanette
- Lee White as Dixie Dalrymple
- Sue England as Dorothy Kenworthy
- James Flavin as Stan Caldwell
- Paul Maxey as Judge Kenworthy
- Paul Bryar as Sad Sam Beale
- Joel Marston as Duke McCall
- Guy Beach as Pop Lassiter
