= Mister Rock and Roll (film) =

1957 film by Charles S. Dubin

- Theatrical release poster
- Directed by: Charles S. Dubin
- Screenplay by: James Blumgarten
- Produced by: Ralph B. Serpe
- Starring: Alan Freed; Teddy Randazzo; Lois O'Brien; Rocky Graziano; Jay Barney; Al Fisher; Lou Marks
- Cinematography: Maurice Hartzband
- Edited by: Angelo Ross
- Production company: Aurora Productions LLC
- Distributed by: Paramount Pictures
- Release date: October 16, 1957
- Running time: 86 minutes
- Country: United States
- Language: English

Mister Rock and Roll is a 1957 American musical film directed by Charles S. Dubin and written by James Blumgarten.

The film stars Alan Freed, Teddy Randazzo, Lois O'Brien (Lois Pope), Rocky Graziano, Jay Barney, Al Fisher and Lou Marks.

The film was released on October 16, 1957, by Paramount Pictures.

== Plot ==
Following an opening credits sequence with Lionel Hampton singing the title song ("Mister Rock and Roll"), radio personality Alan Freed hosts a rock and roll concert at the Brooklyn Paramount, and introduces rising singer Teddy Randazzo and his song "Kiddio". After his performance, Teddy fends off his friends Fisher & Marks, a brash songwriting duo, and agrees to be interviewed by young reporter for World Magazine Carole Hendricks. Unpretentiously over dinner, he tells her an abbreviated account of how he came to draw the attention of Freed, and the two of them develop chemistry with each other, singing a duet ("It's Heavenly"). Concurrently, Freed works his shift at WINS radio, playing several singles that transition into filmed performances by their artists ("You'll Be There" by Clyde McPhatter, "Love Put Me Out Of My Head" by Frankie Lymon and the Teenagers, "The Get Acquainted Waltz" by Shaye Cogan, and "Barcelona Rock" by The Moonglows").

Joe Prentiss, columnist and Hendricks' supervisor at the magazine, grills her for prurient information about her interval with Teddy; as someone skeptical of the rock phenomenon and Freed's role in promoting it, his hope is to get a scandalous story about Teddy to discredit everyone involved. Freed introduces more songs during his shift ("This Moment Of Love" by Ferlin Husky, "Baby Doll" by Chuck Berry, "If Only I Had Known" by Brook Benton). A montage of headlines presents Prentiss' crusade against the rock movement.

Teddy, after performing another live show for Freed ("Next Stop Paradise"), is met backstage by Carole. He angrily confronts her about the hatchet job performed by Prentiss in his publications; Carole agrees to leave him be. In his dressing room, he sings to himself ("I Was the Last One to Know"), is interrupted by Fisher & Marks, then visited by Rocky Graziano seeking the younger star's advice on attracting women ("Rocky's Love Song"), and finally by Freed, who encourages him to mend fences with Carole, and says he will take care of fighting the bad press.

On his next broadcast, Freed challenges Prentiss by recounting his history with rock and roll, leading to a flashback to three years earlier in Cleveland, when Freed was working in that radio market. In a local record store, Alan and Rocky browse records, and first meet with Teddy and Fisher & Marks, discovering that the youths are drawn to rhythm and blues, not yet a staple of mainstream radio. He proceeds to play "Lucille" by Little Richard on his Cleveland show, and in montage, Freed details how the sound found its audience, leading to a "Rock'n'Roll Coronation Night" show, where Freed introduces Lionel Hampton and his band ("How Do You Do") to an integrated teen audience, and as they do another song ("Hey Poppa Rock"), a representative from WINS New York offers Freed a position. As Freed and the music become a national sensation, an earlier Paramount theatre concert showcases LaVern Baker ("Humpty Dumpty Heart"), Ferlin Husky ("Make Me Love Again"), and Clyde McPhatter ("Rock and Cry"). Returning to the present day studio, Freed appeals to Prentiss' memory of his own youth to reconsider his reactionary stance, and asks the listeners of the program to collect money and bring it to the radio station to donate to Prentiss' preferred charity, The Heart Fund. He closes the segment by playing "Star Rocket" by Lionel Hampton.

Prentiss and Carole have been listening to the broadcast, and while driving her home, they continue listening to the show on the car radio, as Freed declares how much money has been coming in for The Heart Fund. He segues to another LaVern Baker song ("Love Me Right (In the Morning)"). Instead of taking Carole home, he takes her to WINS, so that she can personally take a check from him to donate to The Heart Fund, send his apologies to Freed, and reunite with Teddy. Freed introduces another Shave Cogan song ("Pathway to Sin"), and upon recounting the record funds raised for the charity, Teddy and Carole celebrate, Rocky arrives to introduce his girlfriend, and Freed thanks the teens for their generosity and support. He introduces Frankie Lymon and the Teenagers ("Fortunate Fella"), and Teddy follows them to perform "I'd Stop Anything I'm Doing" to close the show.

== Cast ==
- Alan Freed as himself
- Teddy Randazzo as himself
- Lois O'Brien as Carole Hendricks
- Rocky Graziano as himself
- Jay Barney as Joe Prentiss
- Al Fisher as Al
- Lou Marks as Lou
- Leo Wirtz as Earl George
- Ralph Stantley as Station Representative
- Lionel Hampton as himself
- Ferlin Husky as himself
- Frankie Lymon as himself
- Little Richard as himself
- Brook Benton as himself
- Chuck Berry as himself
- Clyde McPhatter as himself
- LaVern Baker as herself
- Shaye Cogan as herself
