= Lorraine Miller (actress) =

American actress (1922–1978)

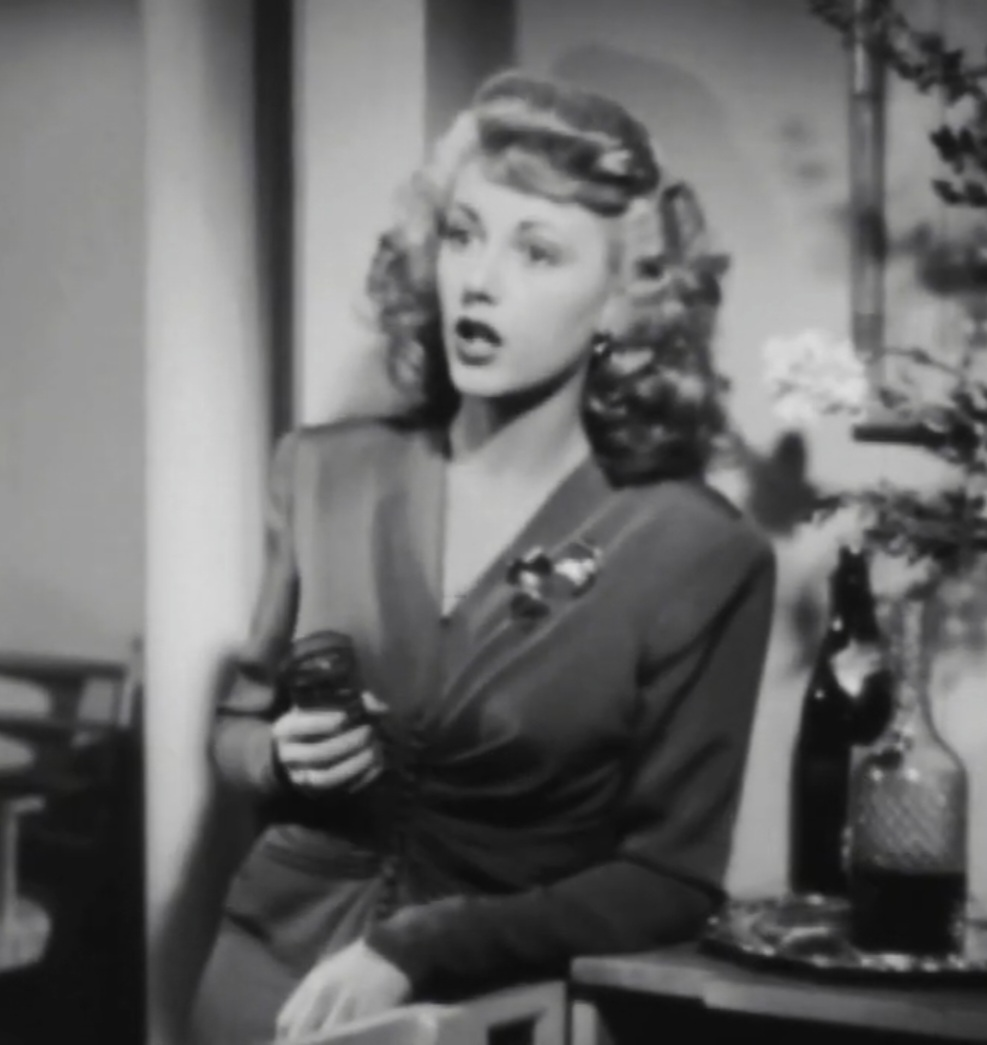
- Miller in Hi Diddle Diddle (1943)
- Born: January 5, 1922; Flint, Michigan, U.S.
- Died: February 6, 1978 (aged 56)
- Occupation: Actress
- Years active: 1936–1961
- Spouse(s): Edward Buzzell (m. 1949; div. 19??)

Lorraine Miller (January 5, 1922 – February 6, 1978) was an American actress. She is best known for appearing in the film The White Gorilla (1945).

== Early life ==
Miller was born in Flint, Michigan. She was the daughter of Charles W. Miller, an electrical engineer. She attended Michigan State College before she became an actress.

== Career ==
In 1944, a photograph of Miller that was printed on postcards resulted in a lawsuit. She sued Photo Specialty Company, Samuel Goldwyn, and others for $50,000, saying that the widely distributed postcards harmed her career, reduced her earning power, and embarrassed her. Taken when Miller worked for Goldwyn, the photograph showed Miller in black lingerie on a white fur rug and had the caption "Samuel Goldwyn's Most Cuddlesome Blonde". The lawsuit said that Miller had not given her consent for use of the image. In 1945 she was a dancer at Billy Rose's Diamond Horseshoe.

On Broadway, Miller appeared in Happy Birthday (1946) and Magdalena (1948).

== Personal life ==
She married American film actor and director Edward Buzzell on December 10, 1949, in Palm Springs, California.

== Filmography ==
=== Film ===
Year	Title	Role	Notes
1936	Colleen	Chorus Girl	(uncredited)
1939	All Women Have Secrets	Marie	
1941	All-American Co-ed	Cherry Queen	(uncredited)
1941	Mitt Me Tonight		(short)
1941	Ball of Fire	Girl in Café	(uncredited)
1942	She's in the Army	Nightclub Singer	
1942	Star Spangled Rhythm	Dancer - 'Swing Shift' Number / Girl - Bob Hope Skit	(uncredited)
1943	Happy Go Lucky	Showgirl	(uncredited)
1943	The Crystal Ball	Garter Girl	(uncredited)
1943	Riders of the Rio Grande	Janet Owens	
1943	Hi Diddle Diddle	Director's Friend	
1943	Beyond the Last Frontier	Susan Cook	
1943	Riding High	Blanche	(uncredited)
1944	Up in Arms	Goldwyn Girl	(uncredited)
1944	Marriage Is a Private Affair	Bit Role	(uncredited)
1944	Thirty Seconds Over Tokyo	Girl in Officers' Club	(uncredited)
1944	Music for Millions	Girl	(uncredited)
1945	The Picture of Dorian Gray	Chorine	(uncredited)
1945	Between Two Women	Marion	
1945	The White Gorilla	Ruth Stacey	
1945	Three in the Saddle	Peggy Barlow	
1945	Ziegfeld Follies	Dancer	(uncredited)
1945	Frontier Fugitives	Ellen Williams	
1945	Men in Her Diary	Pat Mann	
1945	Border Badmen	Helen Stockton	
1945	Mexicana	Dancer	(as Loretta Miller)
1945	The Lonesome Trail	Elsie Melford	
1946	Ambush Trail	Alice Rhodes	
1946	The Big Sleep	Hatcheck Girl	
1950	It's a Small World	Buttons	
1950	Rapture	Marisa Hutton	

=== Television ===
Year	Title	Role	Notes
1954	I Led 3 Lives	Sarah Holman	1 episode
1956	The Californians	Lorraine Lathrop	1 episode
1960	The Donna Reed Show	Woman	1 episode
1961	Target: The Corruptors!	Joyce Grantham	1 episode
