= Moon over Montana =

1946 film directed by Oliver Drake

- Theatrical release poster
- Directed by: Oliver Drake
- Screenplay by: Louise Rousseau
- Story by: Oliver Drake
- Produced by: Oliver Drake
- Starring: Jimmy Wakely; Lee "Lasses" White; Jennifer Holt; Jack Ingram; Louise Arthur; Stanley Blystone
- Cinematography: Harry Neumann
- Edited by: Ace Herman
- Music by: Frank Sanucci
- Production company: Monogram Pictures
- Distributed by: Monogram Pictures
- Release date: February 16, 1946
- Running time: 56 minutes
- Country: United States
- Language: English

Moon over Montana is a 1946 American Western film directed by Oliver Drake and written by Louise Rousseau. The film stars Jimmy Wakely, Lee "Lasses" White, Jennifer Holt, Jack Ingram, Louise Arthur and Stanley Blystone. The film was released on February 16, 1946, by Monogram Pictures.

== Cast ==
- Jimmy Wakely as Jimmy Wakely
- Lee "Lasses" White as Lasses White
- Jennifer Holt as Gwynn Randall
- Jack Ingram as Sam Barkeley
- Louise Arthur as Babs Turner
- Stanley Blystone as Joseph Colton
- Buster Slaven as Phil Barkley
- Terry Frost as Yuma Smith
- Eddie Majors as Dodger
- Bob Duncan as Brick Donovan
- Fiddlin' Arthur Smith as himself
- Woody Woodel as himself
