= West of the Alamo =

1946 film directed by Oliver Drake

- Theatrical release poster
- Directed by: Oliver Drake
- Screenplay by: Louise Rousseau
- Produced by: Oliver Drake
- Starring: Jimmy Wakely; Lee "Lasses" White; Ray Whitley; Jack Ingram; Iris Lancaster; Early Cantrell
- Cinematography: Harry Neumann
- Edited by: William Austin
- Music by: Frank Sanucci
- Production company: Monogram Pictures
- Distributed by: Monogram Pictures
- Release date: April 20, 1946
- Running time: 57 minutes
- Country: United States
- Language: English

West of the Alamo is a 1946 American Western film directed by Oliver Drake and written by Louise Rousseau. The film stars Jimmy Wakely, Lee "Lasses" White, Ray Whitley, Jack Ingram, Iris Lancaster and Early Cantrell. The film was released on April 20, 1946, by Monogram Pictures.

== Cast ==
- Jimmy Wakely as Jimmy Wakely
- Lee "Lasses" White as 'Lasses' White
- Ray Whitley as Keno Wilson
- Jack Ingram as Clay Bradford
- Iris Lancaster as Jane Morgan
- Early Cantrell as Helen Morgan
- Betty Lou Head as Mary Jones
- Budd Buster as Shotgun
- Eddie Majors as Dean Thomas
- Rod Holton as Emmett
- Billy Dix as Pecos Smith
- Arthur 'Fiddlin' Smith as Saddle Pals Fiddle Player
- Roy Butler as Sheriff
