= Six-Gun Serenade =

1947 film directed by Ford Beebe

- Theatrical release poster
- Directed by: Ford Beebe
- Screenplay by: Bennett Cohen
- Produced by: Barney Sarecky
- Starring: Jimmy Wakely; Lee "Lasses" White; Kay Morley; Jimmy Martin; Steve Clark; Pierce Lyden
- Cinematography: Marcel Le Picard
- Edited by: Edward A. Biery
- Music by: Frank Yanucci
- Production company: Monogram Pictures
- Distributed by: Monogram Pictures
- Release date: April 15, 1947
- Running time: 55 minutes
- Country: United States
- Language: English

Six-Gun Serenade is a 1947 American Western film directed by Ford Beebe and written by Bennett Cohen. The film stars Jimmy Wakely, Lee "Lasses" White, Kay Morley, Jimmy Martin, Steve Clark and Pierce Lyden. The film was released on April 15, 1947, by Monogram Pictures.

== Cast ==
- Jimmy Wakely as Jimmy Wakely
- Lee "Lasses" White as 'Lasses' White
- Kay Morley as Mary Saunders
- Jimmy Martin as Curt Weldon
- Steve Clark as Martin Kaly
- Pierce Lyden as Buck
- Bud Osborne as Sheriff
- Rivers Lewis as Lon
- Arthur 'Fiddlin' Smith as Bill
- Stanley Ellison as Joe
