= Louise Rousseau =

American screenwriter

- Born: Louise S. Rousseau; July 22, 1910; Provincetown, Massachusetts, USA
- Died: September 25, 1981 (aged 71); Ojai, California, USA
- Education: Massachusetts Institute of Technology
- Occupation: Screenwriter
- Spouse: John Belding (m. 1930)

Louise Rousseau (1910-1981) was an American screenwriter known primarily for penning B Westerns in the 1940s.

== Biography ==
Rousseau was born in Provincetown, Massachusetts, to Louis Rousseau (a famous French tenor) and his American wife, Frances Simkins (daughter of a prominent Texas lawyer). Her parents split up when she was a baby; her father returned to France, and she was sent to Texas to live with her aunts. She later reconnected with her father in 1932.

While Rousseau was a senior in high school she worked as a reporter for the Dallas Dispatch. After graduating high school at age 15, she became the only female student in the school of engineering at the University of Texas that fall. She studied chemistry at the Massachusetts Institute of Technology. After school, she became a secretary to the manager of the Rivoli Theatre in New York before moving on to Pathe, where she became the assistant of Frank Donovan.

Early on in her Hollywood career, Rousseau worked as a director (one of very few women at the time) of newsreels at Pathe-RKO. She later made a living writing low-budget Westerns — at least until she was called to testify before the House Un-American Activities Committee in 1951.

== HUAC testimony ==
As Counsel Frank S. Tavenner Jr. ran through the standard litany of introductory questions, the customary education query inadvertently set the stage for Rousseau's preemptive rebuttal. "My most important education was gained at my grandmother's knee," protested the audibly outraged writer, who then proceeded to recount lessons learned regarding her heritage as an American, descended from the Huguenots who landed at Jamestown in 1617—those same Huguenots whose somewhat less distant descendants had joined a revolution to transform that colony into a sovereign nation.

Following this unsolicited history lesson, the inevitable "Are you now or have you ever been" litmus test predictably resulted in the sole instance of Rousseau resorting to a stock response—or, rather, non-response (although she did, much to spectators' amusement, volunteer the characterization of her pre-Blacklist employment as writing "historical westerns dealing with the efforts of the little people to overthrow the big people"). (Note: As it happens, the Associated Press—via that brief Rousseau item and another, more extensive article published the same day—provides a novel and dramatically divergent side-by-side comparison, at least as laid out in that day's Kansas City Times, between two HUAC witnesses: the resolutely defiant Rousseau and fellow female B-Western scripter Elizabeth Wilson (wife of director Richard Wilson); the latter being, by contrast, an openly avowed, utterly repentant—and, as duly noted by AP, "honey-haired [and] beaut[iful]"—ex-Party member and fully cooperative witness whose interview evidently took place on the same day.) Before concluding her testimony, Rousseau made sure to get the following remarks on the record.

There has come a time in the life of each generation when they must make a stand. And this is the time when I must make mine. I know that when enough people in this country understand what is happening to their basic human rights they too, will make that stand and the Un-American Committee and the hysteria it has created will be driven into the oblivion of those other kangaroo courts which have cropped up in the moments of unreason in our country. Knowing this history, I would indeed be a poor, crawling creature should I surrender lightly to this, or any other un-American [sic] committee, my heritage of 344 years.

== Selected filmography ==
- Fuzzy Settles Down (1944)
- Swing Hostess (1944)
- Rockin' in the Rockies (1945)
- Rhythm Round-Up (1945)
- Riders of the Dawn (1945)
- Fighting Bill Carson (1945)
- The Lonesome Trail (1945)
- Moon Over Montana (1946)
- Gunning for Vengeance (1946)
- West of the Alamo (1946)
- Lone Star Moonlight (1946)
- Over the Santa Fe Trail (1947)
- Under Colorado Skies (1947)
- Prince of the Plains (1949)
- Mississippi Rhythm (1949)
- Air Hostess (1949)
