= George Connor =

George Connor may refer to:

- George Connor (racing driver) (1906–2001), American racecar driver
- George Connor (American football) (1925–2003), American football player
- George Connor (bishop) (born 1942), Anglican bishop in New Zealand
- George Connor (priest) (1822–1883), Anglican Dean of Windsor
- George Skeffington Connor (1810–1863), lawyer, judge and political figure in Canada West
- George Connor (Australian politician) (1878–1941), member of the South Australian House of Assembly

== See also ==
- George O'Connor (disambiguation)
