= Comin' Round the Mountain =

1951 film by Charles Lamont

- Theatrical release poster
- Directed by: Charles Lamont
- Written by: Robert Lees; Frederic Riedel
- Produced by: Howard Christie
- Starring: Bud Abbott; Lou Costello; Dorothy Shay; Kirby Grant; Shaye Cogan; Joe Sawyer
- Cinematography: George Robinson
- Edited by: Edward Curtiss
- Distributed by: Universal-International
- Release date: July 26, 1951 (New York)
- Running time: 77 minutes
- Country: United States
- Language: English
- Budget: $638,120
- Box office: $1,550,000 (US rentals)

Comin' Round The Mountain is a 1951 film starring the comedy team of Abbott and Costello. It is a hillbilly comedy in the vein of Universal's successful Ma and Pa Kettle series. The film's director Charles Lamont had directed the first two Ma and Pa Kettle films and would later direct three more.

== Plot ==
Theatrical agent Al Stewart has booked his client Dorothy McCoy, the "Manhattan Hillbilly", at a New York nightclub. He has also booked an inept escape artist, the Great Wilbert, at the same location. During his performance, Wilbert cannot escape his shackles and screams for help. Dorothy recognizes Wilbert's shrill scream as the "McCoy clan yell". More evidence of Wilbert's heritage, including a photograph and concertina, are found in his dressing room, and prove that he is the long-lost grandson of "Squeeze Box" McCoy, leader of the McCoy clan. Granny McCoy has been looking for Wilbert, as she will reveal where Squeeze Box hid his gold to family only. Al, Dorothy and Wilbert head to Kentucky, and Granny recounts the story of the McCoy-Winfield feud that began more than 60 years ago. The McCoys choose Wilbert to represent them against Devil Dan Winfield in a turkey shoot. Wilbert has never even seen a gun, and his carelessness leads to a revival of the feud.

Granny informs Wilbert that although he is Squeeze Box's kin, he must marry before the location of the gold can be revealed. Kalem, the longtime head of the clan, declares that Wilbert should marry his 14-year-old daughter Clora (called Matt). Wilbert proposes to Dorothy, who declines because she is in love with Clark Winfield. Granny sends Wilbert to Aunt Huddy, the local witch, to obtain a love potion to use on Dorothy. While obtaining the potion, Huddy and Wilbert make voodoo dolls of each other and stick pins in them, which inflicts pain in the other person. After finally obtaining the potion, Wilbert flies Huddy's broom through the door and crashes into a tree.

The potion initially works well, as Dorothy falls for Wilbert, but then everyone sips it and they all fall in love. The potion's effects eventually fade, and Clark and Dorothy prepare to marry. The Winfield clan soon arrives ready for a fight and a stray bullet breaks the love-potion jar, leading Devil Dan to taste it and fall for Wilbert. Matt reveals the secret to the treasure: a map hidden in Wilbert's concertina that leads to a mine in Winfield territory. Devil Dan helps them enter the mine, where they eventually break through the rock, reaching a vault filled with gold. Armed guards arrive to arrest the hapless treasure seekers, who have breached the United States Bullion Depository at Fort Knox.

== Cast ==
- Bud Abbott as Al Stewart
- Lou Costello as Wilbert Smith
- Dorothy Shay as Dorothy McCoy
- Kirby Grant as Clark Winfield
- Joe Sawyer as Kalem McCoy
- Glenn Strange as Devil Dan Winfield
- Ida Moore as Granny McCoy
- Shaye Cogan as Clora McCoy (Matt)
- Margaret Hamilton as Aunt Huddy
- Guy Wilkerson as Uncle Clem McCoy

== Production ==
Comin' Round the Mountain was filmed from January 15 through February 12, 1951 and was shot almost entirely in sequence.

== Reception ==
In a contemporary review for The New York Times, critic Oscar A. Godbout called the film a "flabby production" and wrote: "Although movies are supposed to be better than ever, Bud Abbott and Lou Costello offer seventy-seven minutes of film time in 'Comin' Round the Mountain'° toward disproving the slogan. ... A broad, slap-stick farce can push a person into a state of happy laughter, but this affair merely pushes you out the door."

== Home media ==
This film has been released twice on DVD: as part of The Best of Abbott and Costello Volume Three in 2004, and as part of the Abbott and Costello: The Complete Universal Pictures Collection in 2008.
