= Song of the Wasteland =

1947 film directed by Thomas Carr

- Theatrical release poster
- Directed by: Thomas Carr
- Screenplay by: J. Benton Cheney
- Produced by: Barney Sarecky
- Starring: Jimmy Wakely; Lee White; Dottye Brown; Henry Hall; John James; Mike Ragan
- Cinematography: Harry Neumann
- Edited by: Fred Maguire
- Production company: Monogram Pictures
- Distributed by: Monogram Pictures
- Release date: May 31, 1947
- Running time: 58 minutes
- Country: United States
- Language: English

Song of the Wasteland is a 1947 American Western film directed by Thomas Carr and written by J. Benton Cheney. The film stars Jimmy Wakely, Lee White, Dottye Brown, Henry Hall, John James and Mike Ragan. The film was released on May 31, 1947, by Monogram Pictures.

== Cast ==
- Jimmy Wakely as Jimmy Wakely
- Lee White as Doc Henderson
- Dottye Brown as Sandra Crane
- Henry Hall as Steve Crane
- John James as Lance Bennett
- Mike Ragan as Tex
- Marshall Reed as Drake
- Gary Garrett as Potter
- Ted Adams as Luke Forbes
- Pierce Lyden as Forrester
- George Chesebro as Fred Brooks
- Chester Conklin as The Jailer
- Johnny Carpenter as Turner
- Johnny Bond as Shorty
- Dick Reinhart as Saddle Pals Concertina Player
- Rivers Lewis as Jack
