= Jack and the Beanstalk (1952 film) =

1952 Abbott & Costello film

- Theatrical release poster
- Directed by: Jean Yarbrough
- Written by: Nat Curtis; Pat Costello
- Produced by: Alex Gottlieb; Pat Costello; Bud Abbott; Lou Costello
- Starring: Bud Abbott; Lou Costello; Buddy Baer; Dorothy Ford; Shaye Cogan; James Alexander
- Cinematography: George Robinson
- Edited by: Otho Lovering
- Music by: Heinz Roemheld
- Production company: Exclusive Productions
- Distributed by: Warner Bros.
- Release date: April 7, 1952 (New York)
- Running time: 78 minutes
- Country: United States
- Language: English
- Budget: $682,580
- Box office: $1.6 million (U.S. rentals)

Jack and the Beanstalk is a 1952 American fantasy comedy film starring the team of Abbott and Costello and featuring Buddy Baer, Dorothy Ford and Barbara Brown. The screenplay is a comic retelling of the "Jack and the Beanstalk" fairy tale.

== Plot ==
Mr. Dinkle and Jack Strong are assigned by an employment agency to babysit an obnoxious boy named Donald. When they try to read the fairy tale "Jack and the Beanstalk" to the boy, Jack stumbles over the longer words and Donald reads the story instead. Jack falls asleep and dreams that he is the young Jack of the fairy tale.

In his dream, Jack learns that a giant who lives in a castle in the sky has taken all of the kingdom's food and the crown jewels. The princess is obliged to marry a prince from a neighboring kingdom whom she has never met. Jack's mother sends him to sell the last family possession, their beloved cow Henry, to the butcher, Mr. Dinklepuss. Along the way, Jack meets the prince, disguised as a troubadour, who is kidnapped by the giant soon afterward. The unscrupulous Dinklepuss pays Jack five magic beans for the cow. Jack later learns that the giant has also kidnapped the princess and Henry.

Jack's mother, exasperated about the beans, tells Jack to plant them, and a gigantic beanstalk grows overnight. He climbs the beanstalk to rescue everyone from the giant's clutches and retrieve Nellie, the hen that the giant had previously stolen from Jack's family. Dinklepuss joins Jack on the adventure, and when they reach the top of the beanstalk, they are captured by the giant and imprisoned with the prince and princess. The princess falls in love with the troubadour only to later learn that it is the same prince to whom she was betrothed.

The giant releases Dinklepuss and Jack from the dungeon in order to toil around his castle. Jack mixes gunpowder with the chicken feed, causing the giant's omelette to explode in his face. They befriend his housekeeper Polly, who helps them escape over the castle wall along with the royal prisoners, Nellie and some of the giant's stolen gems. They flee down the beanstalk with the giant in pursuit. During the descent, Dinklepuss loses Nellie, who falls into the arms of Jack's mother, and then the gems, which rain down upon the impoverished townsfolk below. Once they all reach the ground, Jack chops the beanstalk, sending the giant falling to his death. The villagers rejoice by dancing around the hole left when the giant fell.

Just before being rewarded by the king for heroism, Jack is rudely awakened when Donald breaks a vase over his head. A second blow to the head from Dinkle returns Jack to his dream state.

Jack and the Beanstalk, without its copyrighted music

== Cast ==
- Bud Abbott as Mr. Dinkle/Mr. Dinklepuss
- Lou Costello as Jack/Jack Strong
- Dorothy Ford as Receptionist/Polly
- Buddy Baer as Police Sergeant Riley/Giant
- Shaye Cogan as Eloise Larkin/Princess Eloise
- David Stollery as Donald Larkin
- James Alexander as Arthur/Prince Arthur
- Barbara Brown as Mrs. Strong
- William Farnum as King
- Arthur Shields as Patrick the Harp
- Johnny Conrad and Dancers

Mel Blanc provides the voices of the woodland animals of the giant's land.

== Production ==
Lou Costello conceived of the idea for Jack and the Beanstalk in order to appeal to children and also to shed a common criticism that he and Bud Abbott had been repeatedly regurgitating stale comedy routines. The story had been brought to the screen as a feature film only once before, as a silent film in 1917. Abbott and Costello researched the fairy tale and discovered at least five separate versions in circulation, which provided them with expanded opportunities for story ideas.

When Universal-International refused to finance the color photography of the film, Abbott and Costello, whose contract allowed them one independent film per year, produced the film through Costello's company, Exclusive Productions. Warner Bros. distributed the film but did not provide financing or production services.

Jack and the Beanstalk was filmed from July 9 through August 2, 1951 at Hal Roach Studios using sets from Joan of Arc (1948).

Before the film's release, Abbott and Costello excised more than 26 minutes, a total of $50,000 worth of production. Some sequences were cut because the team had inadvertently reverted to some tired old lines and gags.

As with The Wizard of Oz, the film's opening and closing segments are presented in sepia tone, although many DVD releases present the sequences in black-and-white. The main portion of the film was filmed in Eastmancolor and presented in the SuperCinecolor process.

== Music ==
Songs written by Lester Lee and Bob Russell:

- "Darlene"
- "Jack and the Beanstalk"
- "I Fear Nothing"
- "Dreamer's Cloth"
- "He Never Looked Better in His Life"

A soundtrack album, including songs and dialogue, was released by Decca Records on June 9, 1952.

== Release ==
RKO Radio Pictures acquired the film in the late 1950s and rereleased it in 1960.

== Reception ==
In a contemporary review for The New York Times, critic Oscar Godbout wrote: "[T]he spotlight is on the pratfalls and mayhem that Abbott and Costello concoct. They have not refined their particular brand of slapstick to any great degree, and the marked improvement can be traced mainly to their choice of a story. While the pair have turned out a film that falls far short of distinguished slapstick comedy, they deserve a plaudit or two for leaving behind the dreary routine of inane stories and meaningless antics. Stay with it, boys, you're gaining."

== Legacy ==
RKO attempted to renew the film's copyright in 1980, but as Jack and the Beanstalk was first copyrighted in 1951, the renewal should have occurred in 1979, 28 years after the original copyright. As a result, the film entered the public domain.

== Home media ==
As the film is in the public domain, Jack and the Beanstalk has been released multiple times in VHS and DVD formats by several companies. It was released on Blu-ray in 2008, 2015 and 2020. In 2020, a Kickstarter campaign to fund a Blu-ray restoration reached its $7,500 goal in two hours. ClassicFlix released the restoration on Blu-ray and DVD on July 26, 2022 in commemoration of the film's 70th anniversary.
