= Shaye Cogan =

American actress (1923 - 2009)

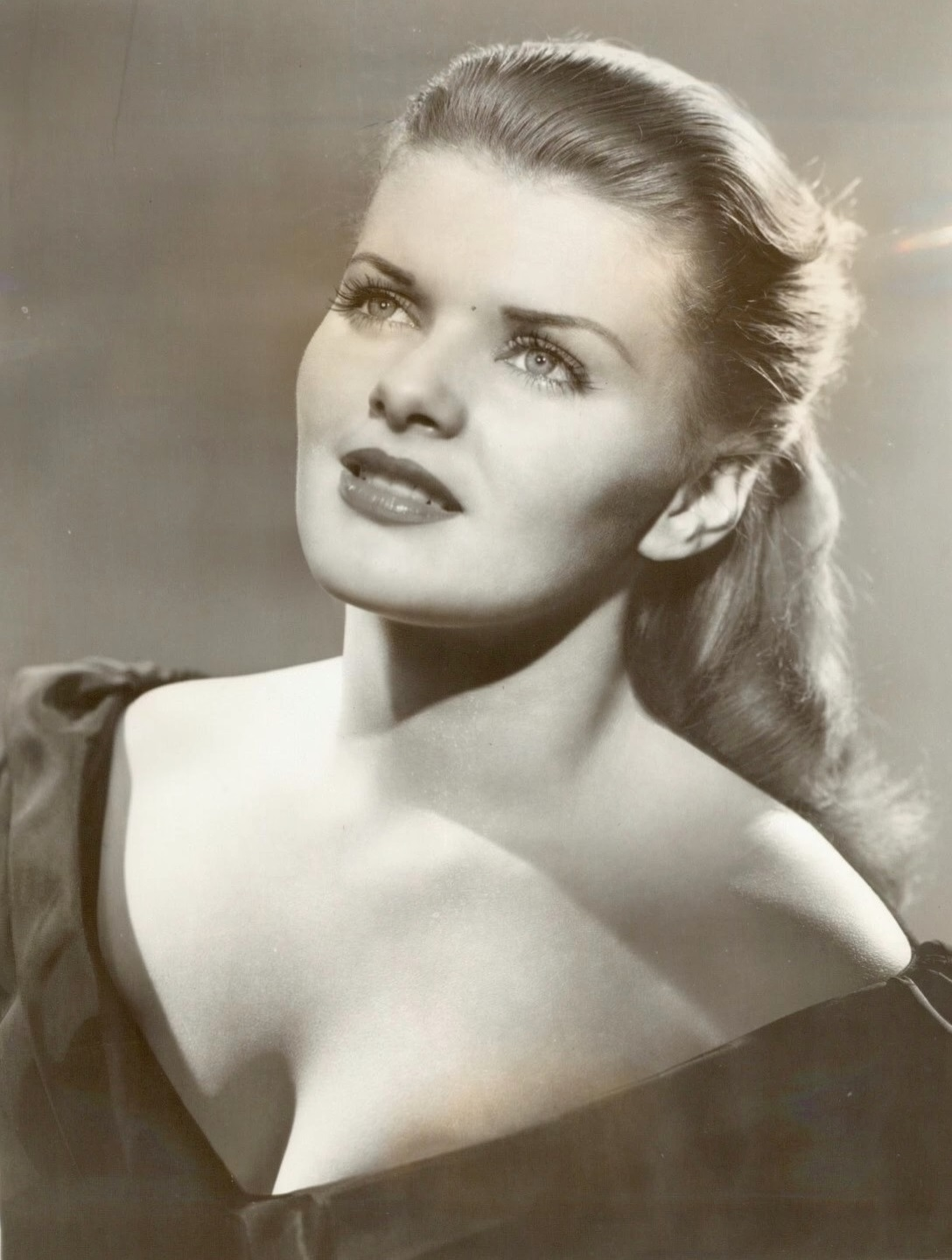
- Cogan in 1952
- Born: Helen J. Coggins; September 20, 1923; Hudson, Massachusetts, U.S.
- Died: June 12, 2009 (aged 85)
- Other name: Shaye Cogan-Morris
- Occupations: Actress; singer
- Years active: 1951–1960
- Spouse: Phil Kahl

Shaye Cogan (September 20, 1923 – June 12, 2009) was an American singer and film actress who appeared in several popular movies in the early 1950s.

== Career ==
She was born Helen J. Coggins, in Hudson, Massachusetts. She started her professional career as a performer in vaudeville with her brothers, Mike and Charlie, as the Coggins Trio. In 1948, having changed her stage name, she appeared as one of the singers in a show at the Village Vanguard in New York City.

After being discovered singing at the Copacabana club, she became a vocalist with Vaughn Monroe's orchestra, singing on the Camel Caravan radio and television programs. She also appeared in the Abbott and Costello movies Comin' Round the Mountain (1951) as Clora McCoy, and Jack and the Beanstalk (1952) as Eloise/Princess/Darlene.

She was married to Phil Kahl, an associate of Roulette Records owner Morris Levy, and won a recording contract with the company, releasing a succession of pop and novelty records in the mid and late 1950s, including "Doodle Doodle Doo" (1957). In the same year, she featured in the early rock and roll movie, Mister Rock and Roll, which starred Alan Freed as himself and also featured Chuck Berry, Little Richard, Frankie Lymon, Lionel Hampton, Brook Benton and Ferlin Husky. She also appeared with Buddy Holly, Little Richard and others as part of the Alan Freed Great Holiday Rock 'n Roll Show in New York in 1957. One of her last records, "Mean to Me", reached no. 40 in the UK singles chart in 1960.

In later years she lived in Modesto, California as Shaye Cogan-Morris. She died in 2009 at the age of 85.

== Partial filmography ==
- Comin' Round the Mountain (1951)
- Jack and the Beanstalk (1952)
