= Mike Ragan =

American film and television actor

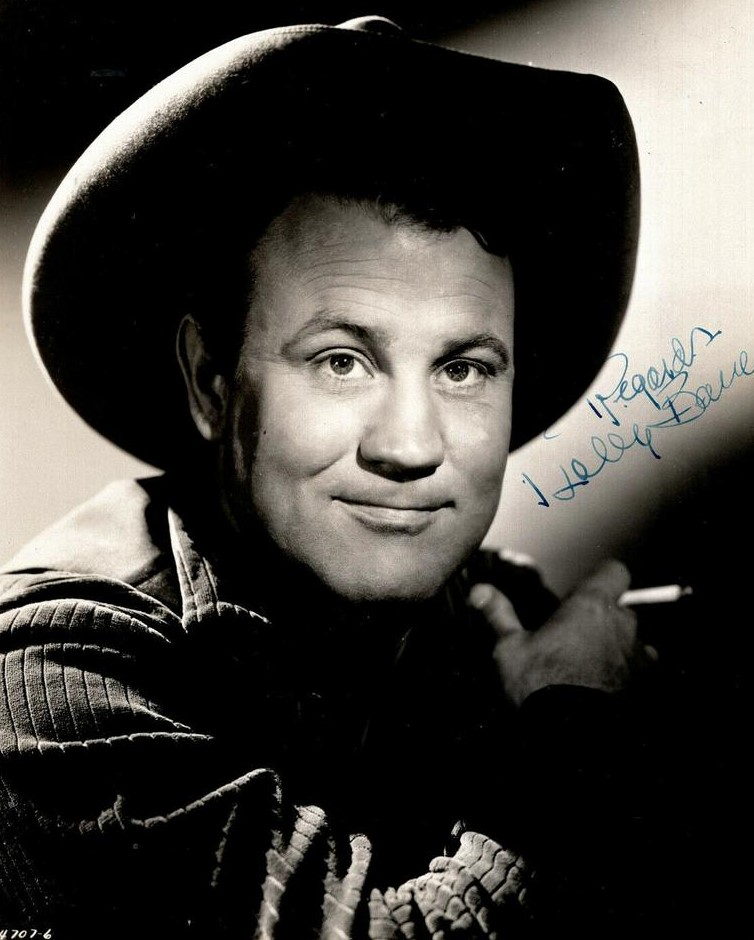
- Ragan in 1947
- Born: Hollis Alan Bane; February 18, 1918; Los Angeles, California, U.S.
- Died: August 25, 1995 (aged 77); Los Angeles, California, U.S.
- Occupations: Film and television actor
- Spouse: Dorothy Ford (m. 1965)

Hollis Alan Bane (February 18, 1918 – August 25, 1995), known professionally as Holly Bane and Mike Ragan, was an American film and television actor.

== Life and career ==
Ragan was born in Los Angeles, California, and was raised in San Francisco, California. He worked as an office boy at MGM. He originally worked as a make-up artist, and he served in the United States Marine Corps during World War II. He began his screen career in 1942, appearing in the film Wake Island. In 1944, he appeared in the film Fuzzy Settles Down.

Later in his career, Ragan guest-starred in numerous television programs including Gunsmoke, Bonanza, The Life and Legend of Wyatt Earp, Tombstone Territory, Wagon Train, Tales of Wells Fargo, Cheyenne, Wanted Dead or Alive, Bat Masterson, Trackdown and The Sheriff of Cochise. He also appeared in films such as West of Wyoming, Song of the Wasteland, Texas Manhunt, Gunpoint, Stagecoach to Dancers' Rock, Texans Never Cry, Christmas Eve, Desperadoes of the West and Jesse James Rides Again.

Ragan retired from acting in 1973, appearing in the film The Outfit.

== Death ==
Ragan died on August 25, 1995, in Los Angeles, California, at the age of 77.
