= Trail to Mexico =

1946 film directed by Oliver Drake

- Theatrical release poster
- Directed by: Oliver Drake
- Screenplay by: Oliver Drake
- Produced by: Oliver Drake
- Starring: Jimmy Wakely; Lee "Lasses" White; Julian Rivero; Dolores Castelli; Dora Del Rio; Terry Frost
- Cinematography: James S. Brown Jr.
- Edited by: Ralph Dixon
- Music by: Frank Sanucci
- Production company: Monogram Pictures
- Distributed by: Monogram Pictures
- Release date: June 29, 1946
- Running time: 56 minutes
- Country: United States
- Language: English

Trail to Mexico is a 1946 American Western film written and directed by Oliver Drake. The film stars Jimmy Wakely, Lee "Lasses" White, Julian Rivero, Dolores Castelli, Dora Del Rio and Terry Frost. The film was released on June 29, 1946, by Monogram Pictures.

== Cast ==
- Jimmy Wakely as Jimmy Wakely / Jimmy Jones
- Lee "Lasses" White as Lasses White
- Julian Rivero as Don Roberto Lopez
- Dolores Castelli as Chinita Lopez
- Dora Del Rio as Dolores
- Terry Frost as Bart Thomas
- Forrest Matthews as Fred Jackson
- Buster Slaven as The Texas Kid
- Alex Montoya as Captain Martinez
- Jonathan McCall as Paymaster McGrath
- Juan Duval as Francisco Valdez
- Arthur 'Fiddlin' Smith as Saddle Pals Fiddle Player
