= Louis A. Cuvillier =

American politician

Louis Andrew Cuvillier (February 4, 1871 – May 18, 1935) was an American lawyer and politician from New York.

== Life ==
He was born on February 4, 1871, in Fairfax County, Virginia, the son of Samuel Cuvillier (1836–1900) and Jane P. (Taylor) Cuvillier (1842–1880). He attended St. John's Military Academy, in Alexandria, Virginia; and Georgetown University. He married Margaret Sheridan (died 1930), and they had one daughter. He practiced law in New York City.

He served in the U.S. Army during the Spanish–American War; and during World War I.

Cuvillier was a member of the New York State Assembly (New York Co., 30th D.) in 1907, 1908 and 1909. In November 1909, he ran for re-election but was defeated by Republican Peter Donovan. Cuvillier 1911, 1912 and 1913; and was Chairman of the Committee on Military Affairs in 1911 and 1913.

He was again a member of the State Assembly (New York Co., 20th D.) in 1920, and was one of the fiercest supporters of the expulsion of the five Socialist assemblymen. In November of that year, he ran for re-election but was defeated by his Republican opponent Mario G. DiPirro.

Cuvillier was again a member of the State Assembly in 1922, 1923, 1924, 1925, 1926, 1927, 1928, 1929, 1930, 1931, 1932 and 1933. In November 1933, he ran for re-election but was defeated by Republican Wilbur J. Murphy.

Cuvillier was the Democratic minority candidate for Clerk of the New York State Assembly in January 1934, and returned as a member to the Assembly in 1935.

He died on May 18, 1935, at the home of his sister at 1120 Bryant Avenue in the Bronx, of bronchial pneumonia; and was buried at Arlington National Cemetery.

Louis Cuvillier Park, located at the Manhattan approach to the Triborough Bridge, was named in his honor.

== Sources ==
New York State Assembly
Preceded by Maurice F. Smith	New York State Assembly; New York County, 30th District; 1907–1909	Succeeded by Peter Donovan
Preceded by Peter Donovan	New York State Assembly; New York County, 30th District; 1911–1913	Succeeded by Edward S. Boylston
Preceded by Charles A. Winter	New York State Assembly; New York County, 20th District; 1920	Succeeded by Mario G. DiPirro
Preceded by Mario G. DiPirro	New York State Assembly; New York County, 20th District; 1922–1933	Succeeded by Wilbur J. Murphy
Preceded by Wilbur J. Murphy	New York State Assembly; New York County, 20th District; 1935	Succeeded by Michael J. Keenan
