= Beyond the Last Frontier =

1943 film

- Theatrical poster
- Directed by: Howard Bretherton
- Written by: John K. Butler; Morton Grant
- Produced by: Louis Gray
- Starring: Eddie Dew; Smiley Burnette; Lorraine Miller; Robert Mitchum
- Cinematography: Bud Thackery
- Edited by: Charles Craft
- Music by: Mort Glickman
- Distributed by: Republic Pictures
- Release date: August 18, 1943
- Running time: 60 minutes
- Country: United States
- Language: English

Beyond the Last Frontier is a 1943 American Western film about an undercover Texas Ranger, John Paul Revere, within Big Bill Hadley's gang of crooks. Howard Bretherton directed the film and John K. Butler and Morton Grant wrote the screenplay. The film stars Eddie Dew as Johnny Revere, Harry Woods as Big Bill Hadley, Robert Mitchum as Trigger Dolan, Lorraine Miller as Susan Cook, and Smiley Burnette as Frog Millhouse.

It was the first in the 'John Paul Revere' series of films, followed by Pride of the Plains and Beneath Western Skies.
