= The White Gorilla =

- Directed by: Harry L. Fraser
- Written by: Harry L. Fraser (story)
- Produced by: Louis Weiss (executive producer); Harry L. Fraser (producer) (uncredited); George M. Merrick (producer) (uncredited)
- Starring: Ray Corrigan
- Narrated by: Ray Corrigan
- Cinematography: Robert E. Cline; Bert Longenecker; William C. Thompson
- Edited by: Adrian Weiss
- Music by: Lee Zahler
- Release date: 1945
- Running time: 62 minutes
- Country: United States
- Language: English

The White Gorilla is a 1945 American film written and directed by Harry L. Fraser and starring Ray Corrigan, Lorraine Miller, and George J. Lewis. The film was made by re-editing Fraser's 1927 silent serial Perils of the Jungle, and adding new footage as a framing plot. This was done without regard to differences in film quality or speed. This film is in the public domain.

The full film

== Plot summary ==
As a jungle trading post, explorer Steve Collins relates the strange story of a man and a woman being stalked and imperiled by jungle beasts, and a mischievous native boy who plays among the animals. Collins discovers a rare albino gorilla in the heart of the jungle. As he forms a unique bond with the majestic creature, Ruth, an ambitious journalist, becomes determined to uncover the mystery behind Collins's groundbreaking discovery. The white gorilla ultimately battles another gorilla, until one of them dies.

== Cast ==
- Ray Corrigan as Steve Collins / Konga, the White Gorilla / Narrator
- Lorraine Miller as Ruth Stacey
- George J. Lewis as Hutton
- Charles King as Morgan
- Francis Ford as Stacey
- Budd Buster as Carter
- Frank Merrill as Bradford, in silent footage
- Eugenia Gilbert as the damsel, in silent footage
- Bobby Nelson as the boy, in silent footage

== Production and reception ==
In 1945 producer Louis Weiss urgently needed a first-run "gorilla picture" when theaters couldn't get many new films, owing to a shortage of film stock. Weiss asked Fraser to write and direct a feature film in time for a San Francisco premiere six weeks later, which had already been arranged. Fraser came up with The White Gorilla, which he frankly admitted was pure hokum.

True to the Weiss tradition of cutting costs, most of the action was taken from Fraser's 1927 silent serial Perils of the Jungle, starring silent-screen Tarzan Frank Merrill. Unlike most Hollywood jungle pictures of the 1940s, which use occasional vintage stock shots of wild animals to add atmosphere, The White Gorilla devotes fully half of the feature's running time to the vintage-1927 footage, with music and sound effects added. So much of the material is antique that leading man Ray Corrigan narrates the story of hero Frank Merrill and heroine Eugenia Gilbert in flashback, with new reaction shots of spectator Corrigan inserted into each of the old sequences. ("He generally manages to stay well out of the way of the action," commented a critic reviewing the film in 1947.) The half-hour of new material, with Corrigan playing both the leading role and the white gorilla, was filmed in four days in a trading-post interior and a standing jungle set, with a small cast of six actors.

Despite the obvious patchwork, the film did well as an exploitable attraction. It was distributed not by a major studio or even a minor one, but through independent channels, so it didn't reach some cities until 1946 or 1947. The White Gorilla, as Fraser recalled in his memoirs, "played in movie theaters across the country, making a bundle for several years, for the Louis Weiss company and for Harry Fraser, who got his cut regularly. It was a stinker of a picture, but it made money. Which only goes to prove that P. T. Barnum was right."
