= George O'Connor (footballer) =

Australian rules footballer

Personal information
- Full name: George Alfred O'Connor
- Born: 28 March 1892; Chewton, Victoria
- Died: 23 September 1921 (aged 29); Fitzroy, Victoria

Playing career^{1}
Years	Club	Games (Goals)
1910–11	Richmond	3 (2)
1911	St Kilda	2 (0)
Total		5 (2)
- ^{1} Playing statistics correct to the end of 1911.

George Alfred O'Connor (28 March 1892 – 23 September 1921) was an Australian rules footballer who played with Richmond and St Kilda in the Victorian Football League (VFL).
