= The Lonesome Trail (1945 film) =

1930 film by Oliver Drake and Lindsley Parsons

- Directed by: Oliver Drake
- Screenplay by: Louise Rousseau
- Story by: Oliver Drake
- Produced by: Oliver Drake; Lindsley Parsons
- Starring: Jimmy Wakely; Lee "Lasses" White; John James
- Cinematography: William A. Sickner
- Edited by: Fred Maguire
- Music by: Frank Sanucci
- Production company: Monogram Pictures
- Release date: December 8, 1945 (United States)
- Running time: 57 minutes
- Country: United States
- Language: English

The Lonesome Trail is a 1945 American Western film directed by Oliver Drake and Lindsley Parsons, starring Jimmy Wakely, Lee "Lasses" White, and John James. It premiered in New York City on December 8, 1945.

== Cast ==
- Jimmy Wakely as Jimmy Wakely
- Lee "Lasses" White as Lasses White
- John James as Dusty James
- Iris Clive as Rita Kelly
- Horace Murphy as Judge Melford
- Lorraine Miller as Elsie Melford
- Eddie Majors as Pete Jones
- Zon Murray as Vincent Worth
- Roy Butler as Pop
- Jasper Palmer as Billy
- Frank McCarroll as Spike Brown
- Jack Hendricks as Henchie
- Jack Pitts as Citizen
- Billy Hammond as Stagecoach driver
- Frank Neill as Dr. O'Neill
- Dee Cooper as Rancher
- The Sunshine Girls
- Arthur B. Smith as Arthur Smith
