= Nigger Blues =

1913 song by Lee "Lasses" White

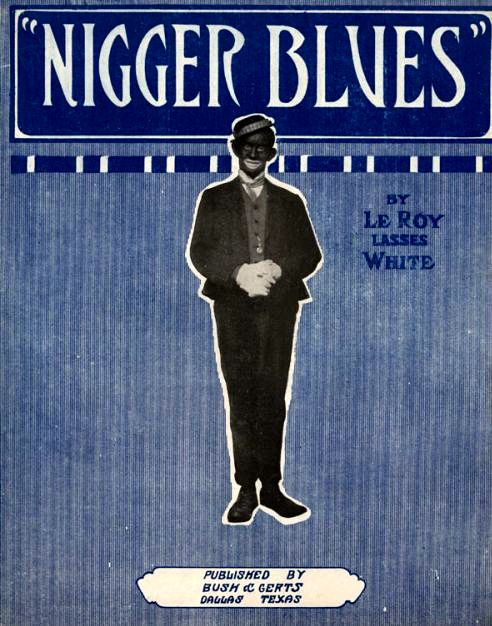
- Sheet music cover, 1913

Song by Lee "Lasses" White
- Written: 1912
- Published: 1913
- Genre: Blues
- Songwriter: Lee "Lasses" White

"Nigger Blues", written by Lee White, was one of the first blues songs published. Copyrighted by the Texas-born White in 1912, it was first titled "Negro Blues", but for unknown reasons when White published it in 1913, he retitled it.

In addition to the importance of the "Nigger Blues" for being one of the first published blues songs and written by one of the first composers of twelve-bar blues, it was the first whose lyrics were in what would become the standard blues form used by the 1920s vaudeville performers and found in the folk blues songs collected and recorded in the 1930s. e.g.:

Oh! the blues aint nothing, Oh! the blues aint nothing
Oh! the blues aint nothing, But a good man feeling bad
Oh! the blues aint nothing, But a good man feeling bad
Oh! that's a feeling That I've often had

and:

Oh! yonder comes, Oh! yonder comes
Oh! yonder comes the train coming down the track
Oh! yonder comes the train coming down the track
To take me away, But it aint going to bring me back

== Early recordings ==
Date	Artist	Label
July 1916	George O'Connor	Columbia A-2064
August 1916	Prince's Band	Columbia A-2064
October 1916	Victor Military Band	Victor 18174
1919	Al Bernard	Edison Blue Amberol 3766

== Bibliography ==
- Cylinder Preservation and Digitization Project. "Nigger Blues". University of California, Santa Barbara.
- Carlin, Richard. Country Music: A Biographical Dictionary. New York: Routledge (2002)
- Gracyk, Tim. Popular American Recording Pioneers: 1895-1925. New York: Routledge (2000).
- Monge, Luigi; David Evans. "New Songs of Blind Lemon Jefferson". Journal of Texas Music History 3:2 (Fall 2003).
- Oliver, Paul; Harrison, Max; Bolcom, William. The New Grove Gospel, Blues and Jazz: With Spirituals and Ragtime. New York: W. W. Norton & Company (1997).
- Rust, Brian. The Columbia Master Book Discography. Westport, CT: Greenwood Press (1999)
- White, Le Roy "Lasses". "Nigger Blues" (sheet music). Dallas, TX: Bush & Gerts (1913).
