= Lee "Lasses" White =

American actor (1888–1949)

- Screen capture of White
- Born: Leroy Robert White; August 28, 1888; Wills Point, Texas, U.S.
- Died: December 16, 1949 (aged 61); Hollywood, California, U.S.
- Resting place: Forest Lawn Memorial Park (Glendale)
- Other names: Lasses White; Leroy "Lasses" White; Lee Roy White
- Occupations: Actor, songwriter, pianist, comic entertainer
- Years active: c.1905–1949
- Spouse: Norma White

Leroy Robert White (August 28, 1888 – December 16, 1949), better known as Lee "Lasses" White or Leroy (sometimes Le Roy or Lee Roy) "Lasses" White, was an American vaudeville pianist, songwriter and entertainer who became an actor of the stage, screen and radio. He became famous doing minstrel shows during the early part of the 1900s, and wrote one of the first copyrighted twelve-bar blues, "Nigger Blues". After spending some time on radio, White entered the film industry in the late 1930s. During his eleven-year career he appeared in over 70 films.

== Life and career ==
Leroy Robert White was born on August 28, 1888, in Wills Point, Texas. He gained the nickname "Lasses" as a child because of his love of molasses. By the age of 12, after his father's death, he was living in Dallas with his mother and siblings, and by about 1905 had started to make a name for himself working in minstrel shows, such as the A.G. Fields Minstrels, and vaudeville. In 1912, he wrote one of the first blues songs ever published, "The Negro Blues", popularized as "Nigger Blues" and known more recently as "Lasses' Blues". Its lyrics became a standard blues form used in the 1920s and '30s.

In 1912 he started a vaudeville troupe with partner Frank Hughes, and two years later joined a larger minstrel show run by George "Honey Boy" Evans, as a singer and comic entertainer. By 1916, after Evans' death, White had taken over the leadership of the company, renamed it Lasses White and his Southern Sunflowers, and toured widely. As a 'blackface' entertainer he also performed in several other minstrel shows, notably Al G. Field's Greater Minstrels, while continuing his songwriting. In 1920 he formed Lasses White's All Star Minstrels, a group of about 50 performers. In the mid-1920s he formed part of a duo with "Honey" Wilds, to whom White gave the nickname as a complement to his own, Lasses. In 1932 White hosted his own Friday night radio program on WSM. In 1934, White & Wilds were given a contract to work at the Grand Ole Opry, where they remained until 1939, having one of the most popular programs at the Opry. Their routine included both songs and dialogues that parodied and satirized the growing commercialism in the United States, particularly in the South.

In 1939 White, along with Wilds and their friend Chill Wills went to Hollywood to enter the film industry. His first role was as a shopkeeper in the Gene Autry western Rovin' Tumbleweeds. While both he and Wills remained in Hollywood, Wilds returned to Nashville. In the early 1940s, White became one of two sidekicks in a series of westerns starring Tim Holt at RKO. He replaced Emmett Lynn, who had been one of Holt's dual sidekicks in the first four films Holt did at RKO. White, in the role of Whopper Hatch, worked on the next eight Holt oaters at Radio during 1941–42. At the same time, White was also a regular in the Scattergood Baines films, playing Ed Potts, the husband of the town gossip. He also appeared in other films during this period, including such notable ones as 1941's biopic Sergeant York, starring Gary Cooper.

White died on December 16, 1949, in Hollywood, California, of leukemia. He was buried in Forest Lawn Memorial Park in Glendale, California.

== Filmography ==
(Per AFI database)

- Midnight Club (1933)
- Trailin' West (1936)
- Grandpa Goes to Town (1940)
- If I Had My Way (1940)
- Oklahoma Renegades (1940)
- The Bandit Trail (1941)
- Come on Danger (1941)
- Cyclone on Horseback (1941)
- Dude Cowboy (1941)
- Scattergood Baines (1941)
- Scattergood Pulls the Strings (1941)
- Sergeant York (1941) - Luke - Target Keeper (uncredited)
- Six-Gun Gold (1941)
- The Round Up (1941)
- Thundering Hoofs (1942)
- You Can't Escape Forever (1942)
- The Talk of the Town (1942)
- Land of the Open Range (1942)
- Riding the Wind (1942)
- Cinderella Swings It (1943)
- Klondike Kate (1943)
- The Unknown Guest (1943)
- Minstrel Man (1944)
- The Adventures of Mark Twain (1944)
- Alaska (1944)
- Song of the Range (1944)
- When Strangers Marry (1944)
- Dillinger (1945)
- The Lonesome Trail (1945)
- Saddle Serenade (1945)
- Springtime in Texas (1945)
- West of the Alamo (1946)
- Fear (1946)
- Moon Over Montana (1946)
- Song of the Sierras (1946)
- Suspense (1946)
- Trail to Mexico (1946)
- Ginger (1946)
- Rainbow Over the Rockies (1947)
- Cheyenne (1947)
- Louisiana (1947)
- Magic Town (1947)
- Six-Gun Serenade (1947)
- Song of the Wasteland (1947)
- The Wistful Widow of Wagon Gap (1947)
- The Trouble with Women (1947)
- The Babe Ruth Story (1948)
- The Dude Goes West (1948)
- The Golden Eye (1948)
- Indian Agent (1948)
- The Lawton Story (1949)
- Mississippi Rhythm (1949)
- Red Rock Outlaw (1949)
- The Valiant Hombre (1949)
- Please Believe Me (1950)
- The Texan Meets Calamity Jane (1950)
