= Charlton Heston filmography =

This is a listing of the film and television appearances of actor Charlton Heston. Several of his radio credits are listed as well.

== Filmography ==
=== 1941–1959 ===
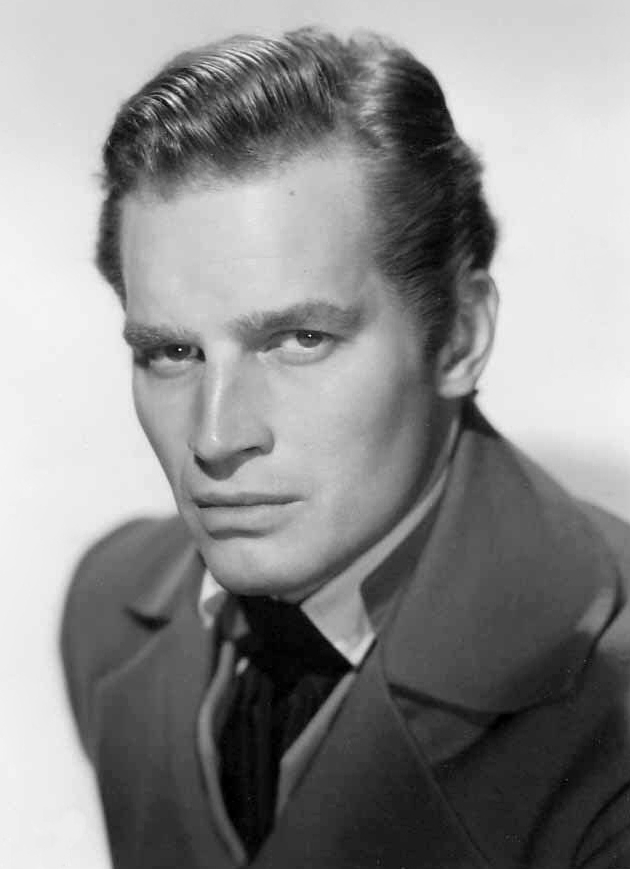
Heston as President Andrew Jackson in 1953

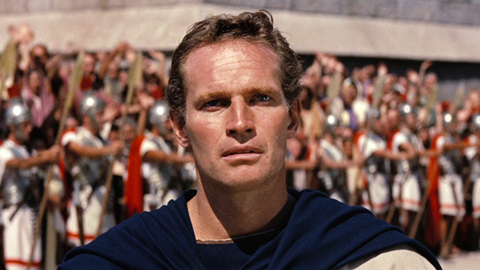
Heston as Ben-Hur

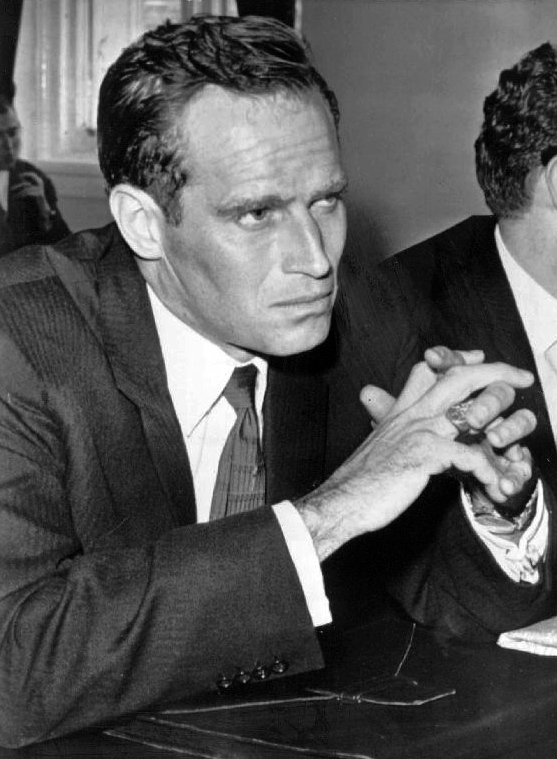
Heston in 1961

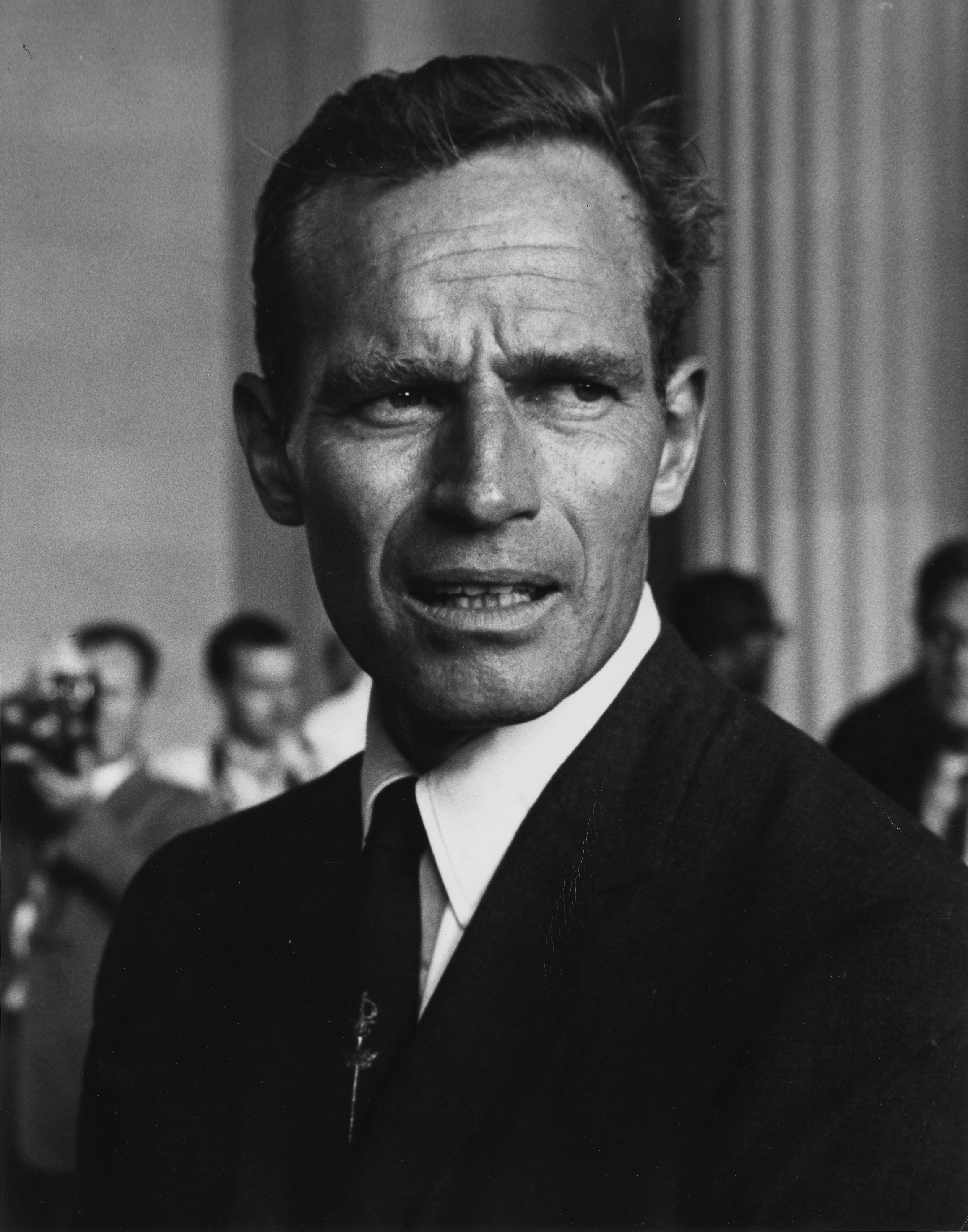
Heston in 1963

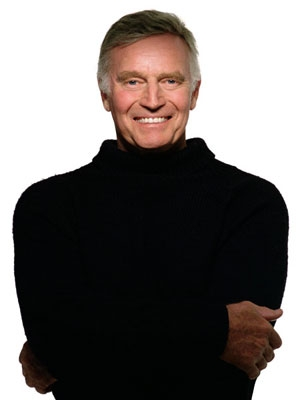
Heston in 2001

Year	Title	Role	Director	Other players
1941	Peer Gynt	Peer Gynt	David Bradley	Betty Hanisee, Lucielle Powell
1950	Julius Caesar	Mark Antony	David Bradley	Harold Tasker, David Bradley
1950	Dark City	Danny Haley / Richard Branton	William Dieterle	Lizabeth Scott, Viveca Lindfors, Dean Jagger
1952	The Greatest Show on Earth	Brad Braden	Cecil B. DeMille	Betty Hutton, Cornel Wilde, Dorothy Lamour, James Stewart
1952	Ruby Gentry	Boake Tackman	King Vidor	Jennifer Jones, Karl Malden
1952	The Savage	James "Jim" Aherne Jr. aka War Bonnet	George Marshall	Susan Morrow
1953	The President's Lady	President Andrew Jackson	Henry Levin	Susan Hayward, John McIntire
1953	Pony Express	"Buffalo Bill" Cody	Jerry Hopper	Rhonda Fleming, Jan Sterling, Forrest Tucker
1953	Arrowhead	Ed Bannon	Charles Marquis Warren	Jack Palance, Katy Jurado, Brian Keith
1953	Bad for Each Other	Dr. Tom Owen	Irving Rapper	Lizabeth Scott
1954	The Naked Jungle	Christopher Leiningen	Byron Haskin	Eleanor Parker, William Conrad
1954	Secret of the Incas	Harry Steele	Jerry Hopper	Robert Young, Nicole Murray
1955	The Far Horizons	William Clark	Rudolph Maté	Fred MacMurray, Donna Reed
1955	The Private War of Major Benson	Maj. Bernard R. "Barney" Benson	Jerry Hopper	Julie Adams, William Demarest
1955	Lucy Gallant	Casey Cole	Robert Parrish	Jane Wyman
1956	The Ten Commandments	Moses	Cecil B. DeMille	Yul Brynner, Anne Baxter, Edward G. Robinson, Nina Foch, Debra Paget, John Derek, Yvonne De Carlo, Vincent Price, Martha Scott
1957	Three Violent People	Capt. Colt Saunders	Rudolph Maté	Anne Baxter, Tom Tryon, Gilbert Roland
1958	Screen Snapshots: Salute to Hollywood	Himself	Ralph Staub	John Wayne, Zsa Zsa Gabor
1958	Touch of Evil	Ramon Miguel "Mike" Vargas	Orson Welles	Janet Leigh, Orson Welles, Dennis Weaver, Zsa Zsa Gabor, Marlene Dietrich
1958	The Big Country	Steve Leech	William Wyler	Gregory Peck, Jean Simmons, Carroll Baker, Burl Ives, Charles Bickford, Chuck Connors
1958	The Buccaneer	Gen. Andrew Jackson	Anthony Quinn	Yul Brynner, Claire Bloom, Inger Stevens, Charles Boyer, Henry Hull, Lorne Greene
1959	Ben-Hur	Judah Ben-Hur	William Wyler	Jack Hawkins, Haya Harareet, Stephen Boyd, Martha Scott, Cathy O'Donnell, Sam Jaffe, Hugh Griffith, Finlay Currie
1959	The Wreck of the Mary Deare	John Sands	Michael Anderson	Gary Cooper, Virginia McKenna, Michael Redgrave, Richard Harris

=== 1961–1970 ===
Year	Title	Role	Director	Other players
1961	El Cid	El Cid (Rodrigo Díaz de Vivar)	Anthony Mann	Sophia Loren, Raf Vallone, Geneviève Page, John Fraser, Gary Raymond, Hurd Hatfield, Herbert Lom
1962	The Pigeon That Took Rome	Capt. Paul MacDougall / Benny the Snatch / Narrator	Melville Shavelson	Elsa Martinelli
1963	Diamond Head	Richard "King" Howland	Guy Green	Yvette Mimieux, George Chakiris, James Darren
1963	55 Days at Peking	Maj. Matt Lewis	Nicholas Ray	David Niven, Ava Gardner
1963	The Five Cities of June	Narrator	Bruce Herschensohn	
1965	The Greatest Story Ever Told	John the Baptist	George Stevens	Max von Sydow, Telly Savalas
1965	The Agony and the Ecstasy	Michelangelo Buonarroti	Carol Reed	Rex Harrison, Diane Cilento
1965	Major Dundee	Major Amos Charles Dundee	Sam Peckinpah	Richard Harris, Jim Hutton, James Coburn
1965	The War Lord	Chrysagon	Franklin J. Schaffner	Richard Boone, Rosemary Forsyth
1966	Khartoum	Gen. Charles "Chinese" Gordon	Basil Dearden	Laurence Olivier, Ralph Richardson
1967	All About People	Narrator	Saul Rubin	
1967	While I Run This Race	Narrator	Edmund Levy	
1968	Counterpoint	Lionel Evans	Ralph Nelson	Maximilian Schell, Kathryn Hays
1968	Will Penny	Will Penny	Tom Gries	Joan Hackett, Donald Pleasence
1968	Planet of the Apes	George Taylor	Franklin J. Schaffner	Roddy McDowall, Kim Hunter, Maurice Evans, Linda Harrison
1969	Number One	Ron "Cat" Catlan	Tom Gries	Jessica Walter, Bruce Dern
1970	Beneath the Planet of the Apes	George Taylor	Ted Post	James Franciscus, Kim Hunter, Maurice Evans, Linda Harrison
1970	The Hawaiians	Whipple "Whip" Hoxworth	Tom Gries	Tina Chen, Geraldine Chaplin, John Phillip Law
1970	Julius Caesar	Mark Antony	Stuart Burge	Jason Robards, John Gielgud, Robert Vaughn, Richard Chamberlain, Diana Rigg, Christopher Lee
1970	King: A Filmed Record... Montgomery to Memphis	Narrator	Sidney Lumet; Joseph L. Mankiewicz	Harry Belafonte, Ruby Dee, Ben Gazzara, Charlton Heston, James Earl Jones, Burt Lancaster, Paul Newman, Anthony Quinn, Marlon Brando, Clarence Williams III, Joanne Woodward

=== 1971–1980 ===
Year	Title	Role	Director	Other players
1971	Escape from the Planet of the Apes	George Taylor (archival footage only)	Don Taylor	Roddy McDowall, Kim Hunter
1971	The Omega Man	Robert Neville	Boris Sagal	Anthony Zerbe, Rosalind Cash
1972	Antony and Cleopatra	Mark Antony	Charlton Heston	Hildegarde Neil, Eric Porter
1972	Skyjacked	Capt. Henry "Hank" O'Hara	John Guillermin	Yvette Mimieux, James Brolin
1972	The Call of the Wild	John Thornton	Ken Annakin	Michele Mercier
1973	Soylent Green	Detective Robert Thorn	Richard Fleischer	Edward G. Robinson, Leigh Taylor-Young, Chuck Connors, Joseph Cotten
1973	The Three Musketeers	Cardinal Richelieu	Richard Lester	Michael York, Raquel Welch, Richard Chamberlain, Oliver Reed, Faye Dunaway, Christopher Lee, Geraldine Chaplin
1974	Airport 1975	Capt. Alan Murdock	Jack Smight	Karen Black, George Kennedy, Gloria Swanson, Efrem Zimbalist Jr., Susan Clark, Helen Reddy, Linda Blair, Dana Andrews, Roy Thinnes, Sid Caesar, Myrna Loy, Ed Nelson, Nancy Olson, Larry Storch, Martha Scott
1974	The Four Musketeers	Cardinal Richelieu	Richard Lester	Michael York, Raquel Welch, Richard Chamberlain, Oliver Reed, Faye Dunaway, Christopher Lee, Geraldine Chaplin
1974	Earthquake	Stewart Graff	Mark Robson	Ava Gardner, George Kennedy, Lorne Greene, Geneviève Bujold, Richard Roundtree, Marjoe Gortner, Barry Sullivan, Lloyd Nolan, Victoria Principal, Monica Lewis, Walter Matthau
1975	The Fun of Your Life	Narrator	John J. Hennessy	
1976	Midway	Capt. Matthew Garth	Jack Smight	Henry Fonda, Toshirō Mifune, Robert Mitchum
1976	Two-Minute Warning	Capt. Peter Holly	Larry Peerce	John Cassavetes, Martin Balsam, Beau Bridges, Jack Klugman, Gena Rowlands, David Janssen, Marilyn Hassett, Walter Pidgeon, Mitchell Ryan, Pamela Bellwood, David Groh, Brock Peters
1976	The Last Hard Men	Sam Burgade	Andrew V. McLaglen	James Coburn, Barbara Hershey, Jorge Rivero, Michael Parks
1977	The Prince and the Pauper	King Henry VIII	Richard Fleischer	Oliver Reed, Raquel Welch, Mark Lester, Ernest Borgnine, George C. Scott, Rex Harrison
1978	Gray Lady Down	Capt. Paul Blanchard	David Greene	David Carradine, Stacy Keach, Ned Beatty, Christopher Reeve
1980	The Mountain Men	Bill Tyler	Richard Lang	Brian Keith, Stephen Macht, John Glover
1980	The Awakening	Matthew Corbeck	Mike Newell	Susannah York, Stephanie Zimbalist

=== 1982–2003 ===
Year	Title	Role	Director	Other players
1982	Mother Lode	Silas McGee / Ian McGee	Charlton Heston	Kim Basinger, Nick Mancuso
1985	The Fantasy Film Worlds of George Pal	Himself	Arnold Leibovit	George Pal
1989	Call from Space	Alien (voice only)	Richard Fleischer	James Coburn
1990	Solar Crisis	Adm. "Skeet" Kelso	Richard C. Sarafian	Tim Matheson, Peter Boyle, Jack Palance
1990	Almost an Angel	God	John Cornell	Paul Hogan, Linda Kozlowski
1992	Genghis Khan (unfinished)	Togrul	Ken Annakin, Peter Duffell, Antonio Margheriti	Richard E. Grant, Richard Tyson
1993	Wayne's World 2	Good Actor	Stephen Surjik	Mike Myers, Dana Carvey, Tia Carrere, Christopher Walken, Kim Basinger
1993	Tombstone	Henry Hooker	George P. Cosmatos	Kurt Russell, Val Kilmer, Sam Elliott, Bill Paxton, Powers Boothe, Michael Biehn, Thomas Hayden Church, Billy Zane, Billy Bob Thornton, Dana Delaney
1994	True Lies	Spencer Trilby	James Cameron	Arnold Schwarzenegger, Jamie Lee Curtis, Bill Paxton, Tom Arnold, Tia Carrere
1994	In the Mouth of Madness	Jackson Harglow	John Carpenter	Sam Neill, Julie Carmen, Jürgen Prochnow
1996	The Dark Mist	Narrator	Ryan Carroll	Teri Austin
1996	Alaska	Colin Perry, the Poacher	Fraser Clarke Heston	Thora Birch, Vincent Kartheiser
1996	Hamlet	Player King	Kenneth Branagh	Kenneth Branagh, Julie Christie, Billy Crystal, Gérard Depardieu, Derek Jacobi, Jack Lemmon, Robin Williams, Kate Winslet
1997	Hercules	Narrator (Cameo)	Ron Clements, John Musker	Tate Donovan, James Woods, Rip Torn, Danny DeVito, Susan Egan
1998	Armageddon	Narrator	Michael Bay	Bruce Willis, Billy Bob Thornton, Ben Affleck, Liv Tyler, Michael Clarke Duncan
1999	Gideon	Addison Sinclair	Claudia Hoover	Christopher Lambert, Carroll O'Connor, Shirley Jones
1999	Any Given Sunday	Commissioner	Oliver Stone	Al Pacino, Cameron Diaz, Dennis Quaid, James Woods, Jamie Foxx
2001	Town & Country	Mr. Claybourne	Peter Chelsom	Warren Beatty, Diane Keaton, Andie MacDowell, Goldie Hawn, Garry Shandling
2001	Cats & Dogs	The Mastiff (voice only)	Lawrence Guterman	Jeff Goldblum, Elizabeth Perkins, Tobey Maguire
2001	Planet of the Apes	Zaius, Thade's Father	Tim Burton	Mark Wahlberg, Tim Roth, Helena Bonham Carter, Paul Giamatti, Michael Clarke Duncan
2001	The Order	Prof. Walter Finley	Sheldon Lettich	Jean-Claude Van Damme
2002	Bowling for Columbine	Himself (interviewee)	Michael Moore	Michael Moore
2003	Greatest Heroes and Legends of the Bible	narration + voice of Moses	William R. 'Bill' Kowalchuk, Jr. & Glenn Patterson	
2003	Ben Hur	Judah Ben-Hur (voice only)	William R. Kowalchuk, Jr.	Scott McNeil, Gerald Plunkett
2003	Rua Alguem 5555: My Father	The Father (Josef Mengele)	Egidio Eronico	Thomas Kretschmann, F. Murray Abraham

=== Box office ranking ===
For several years, the Quigley Company's "Poll of Film Exhibitors" ranked Heston as one of the most popular stars in the US:

- 1953 - 23rd
- 1960 - 16th
- 1961 - 18th
- 1962 - 12th most popular

== Television ==
=== 1949–1960 ===
Date	Title	Episode	Role
March 15, 1949	Suspense	"Suspicion"	?
June 15, 1949	Studio One	"Smoke"	?
September 26, 1949	Studio One	"The Outward Room"	?
October 24, 1949	Studio One	"Battleship Bismark"	Gunnery Officer
November 8, 1949	Suspense	"Suspicion"	?
November 21, 1949	Studio One	"Of Human Bondage"	Philip Carey
December 12, 1949	Studio One	"Jane Eyre"	Edward Rochester
February 27, 1950	Studio One	"The Willow Cabin"	Michael Knowle
March 22, 1950	The Clock	"The Hypnotist"	?
June 5, 1950	Studio One	"The Taming of the Shrew"	Petruchio
June 25, 1950	The Philco Television Playhouse	"Hear My Heart Speak"	?
October 30, 1950	Studio One	"Wuthering Heights"	Heathcliff
December 4, 1950	Studio One	"Letter from Cairo"	?
October 2, 1951	Suspense	"Santa Fe Flight"	?
October 8, 1951	Lux Video Theatre	"Route 19"	?
October 13, 1951	Your Show of Shows	"Episode: October 13, 1951"	Himself
October 22, 1951	Studio One	"Macbeth"	Macbeth
November 12, 1951	Studio One	"A Bolt of Lightning"	James Otis
November 23, 1951	Schlitz Playhouse of Stars	"One Is a Lonesome Number"	?
December 22, 1951	Your Show of Shows	"Episode dated 22 December 1951"	Himself
January 14, 1952	Robert Montgomery Presents	"Cashel Byron's Profession"	Cashel Bryon
March 10, 1952	Studio One	"The Wings of the Dove"	Merton Densher
August 22, 1952	Curtain Call	"The Liar"	?
December 29, 1952	Robert Montgomery Presents	"The Closed Door"	Peter Handley
January 25, 1953	The Philco Television Playhouse	"Elegy"	?
December 12, 1953	Medallion Theatre	"A Day in Town"	?
January 16, 1954	Your Show of Shows	"Episode: January 16, 1954"	Himself
February 2, 1954	Danger	"Freedom to Get Lost"	?
March 3, 1955	The George Gobel Show	"Episode: March 3, 1955"	Himself/Sketch Performer
June 12, 1955	The Colgate Comedy Hour	"Episode #5.30"	Himself – Host
June 26, 1955	The Colgate Comedy Hour	"Episode #5.31"	Himself – Host
August 7, 1955	The Colgate Comedy Hour	"Episode #5.36"	Himself
August 28, 1955	The Colgate Comedy Hour	"Episode #5.38"	Himself – Host
September 4, 1955	The Colgate Comedy Hour	"Episode #5.39"	Himself – Host
September 26, 1955	Robert Montgomery Presents	"Along Came Jones"	Melody Jones
October 9, 1955	Omnibus	"The Birth of Modern Times"	Himself
October 14, 1955	Person to Person	"Episode #3.7"	Himself
December 11, 1955	General Electric Theater	"The Seeds of Hate"	Tim
December 29, 1955	Climax!	"Bailout at 43,000 Feet"	Lieutenant Paul Peterson
October 4, 1956	Playhouse 90	"Forbidden Area"	Major Jesse Price
October 28, 1956	What's My Line?	"Episode #8.6"	Mystery Guest
December 2, 1956	The Steve Allen Show	"Episode #2.11"	Himself
May 17, 1957	Schlitz Playhouse of Stars	"Switch Station"	?
June 27, 1957	Climax!	"The Trial of Captain Wirtz"	Chipman
November 17, 1957	The Ed Sullivan Show	"Episode #11.8"	Himself
December 11, 1957	This Is Your Life	"Dennis Weaver"	Himself
January 12, 1958	Shirley Temple's Storybook	"Beauty and the Beast"	The Beast
February 20, 1958	Playhouse 90	"Point of No Return"	Charles Gray
January 25, 1959	The Ed Sullivan Show	"Episode #12.20"	Himself
March 15, 1959	The Steve Allen Show	"Episode #4.26"	Himself – Guest
July 26, 1959	The Ed Sullivan Show	"Episode #12.45"	Himself
December 27, 1959	The Ed Sullivan Show	"Episode #13.15"	Himself
April 11, 1960	The Steve Allen Show	"Episode #5.25"	Himself – Guest
May 1, 1960	The Ed Sullivan Show	"Episode #13.31"	Actor – Dramatic Reading
May 5, 1960	The Revlon Revue	"Tiptoe Through TV"	Himself
November 6, 1960	The Ed Sullivan Show	"See America with Ed Sullivan: Chicago"	Actor – Dramatic Reading

=== 1961–1980 ===
Date	Title	Episode	Role
October 17, 1961	Alcoa Premiere	"The Fugitive Eye"	Paul Malone
November 15, 1963	Hallmark Hall of Fame	"The Patriots"	Thomas Jefferson
June 8, 1966	A Whole Scene Going	"Episode #1.23"	Actor
January 31, 1968	Hallmark Hall of Fame	"Elizabeth the Queen"	Robert Devereux
March 31, 1968	The Ed Sullivan Show	"Episode #21.30"	Himself – Dramatic Reader
June 9, 1968	The Ed Sullivan Show	"Episode #21.39"	Dramatic Reader
June 4, 1970	The Merv Griffin Show	"Episode: June 4, 1970"	Himself
October 1, 1970	The Tonight Show Starring Johnny Carson	"Episode: October 1, 1970"	Himself
August 18, 1971	The Tonight Show Starring Johnny Carson	"Episode: August 18, 1971"	Himself
August 21, 1971	The Irv Kupcinet Show	"Episode: August 21, 1971"	Himself
November 26, 1971	V.I.P.-Schaukel	"Episode #1.3"	Himself
December 12, 1971	Parkinson	"Episode #1.21"	Himself
February 26, 1972	Film Night	"Episode: February 26, 1972"	Himself
May 7, 1972	The Special London Bridge Special	(TV special)	Tennis Player
May 11, 1972	The Tonight Show Starring Johnny Carson	"Episode: May 11, 1972"	Himself
December 12, 1972	The Tonight Show Starring Johnny Carson	"Episode: December 12, 1972"	Himself
March 28, 1973	The Tonight Show Starring Johnny Carson	"Episode: March 28, 1973"	Himself
August 23, 1973	The Tonight Show Starring Johnny Carson	"Episode: August 23, 1973"	Himself
October 18, 1973	Jack Paar Tonite	"Episode: October 18, 1973"	Himself
October 23, 1973	Dinah's Place	"Episode: October 23, 1973"	Himself
May 29, 1974	ABC's Wide World of Entertainment	"That's Entertainment! 50 Years of MGM"	Himself
October 15, 1974	The Mike Douglas Show	"Episode: October 15, 1974"	Himself
May 3, 1976	Dinah!	"Episode: May 3, 1976"	Himself
September 17, 1976	Dinah!	"Episode: September 17, 1976"	Himself
December 10, 1976	The Tonight Show Starring Johnny Carson	"Episode: December 10, 1976"	Himself
November 22, 1977	Energy: A National Issue	(TV special)	Narrator (voice)
April 10, 1978	America 2-Night	"60 Seconds of Fame"	Himself

=== 1981–1990 ===
Date	Title	Episode	Role
December 15, 1981	The Tonight Show Starring Johnny Carson	"Episode: December 15, 1981"	Himself
December 13, 1983	Chiefs	(TV mini-series)	Hugh Holmes
October 17, 1984	Nairobi Affair	(TV movie)	Lee Cahill
January 12, 1985	Aspel & Company	"Episode #2.1"	Himself
October 9, 1985	Dynasty	"The Californians"	Jason Colby
October 16, 1985	Dynasty	"The Man"	Jason Colby
November 13, 1985	Dynasty	"The Titans"	Jason Colby
November 20, 1985	The Colbys	(Series regular — 48 episodes)	Jason Colby
December 4, 1985	The Tonight Show Starring Johnny Carson	"Episode: December 4, 1985"	Himself
April 3, 1986	Good Morning America	"Episode: April 3, 1986"	Himself
November 9, 1986	The Wonderful World of Disney	"Walt Disney World's 15th Anniversary Celebration"	Himself
March 28, 1987	Saturday Night Live	"Charlton Heston / Wynton Marsalis"	Host
October 1, 1987	Proud Men	(TV movie)	Charley Mac Leod Sr.
October 10, 1987	The Dame Edna Experience	"Episode #1.5"	Himself
December 25, 1987	The Two Ronnies 1987 Christmas Special	(TV special)	Bar Customer
December 21, 1988	A Man for All Seasons	(TV movie)	Sir Thomas More
February 20, 1989	Original Sin	(TV movie)	Louis Mancini
January 22, 1990	Treasure Island	(TV movie)	Long John Silver
August 17, 1990	The Little Kidnappers	(TV movie)	James MacKenzie

=== 1991–2003 ===
Date	Title	Episode	Role
February 20, 1991	The Man Who Saw Tomorrow (1991 remake)	(documentary)	Narrator (voice)
March 18, 1991	Cults: Saying No Under Pressure	(documentary)	Narrator (voice)
November 4, 1991	The Crucifer of Blood	(TV movie)	Sherlock Holmes
February 24, 1992	A Thousand Heroes aka Crash Landing: The Rescue of Flight 232	(TV movie)	Captain Al Haynes
December 1, 1992	Noël	(TV special)	Narrator (voice)
November 10, 1993	The Mystery of the Sphinx	"Charlton Heston /John Anthony West"	Host
December 4, 1993	Saturday Night Live	"Charlton Heston /Paul Westerberg"	Host
April 13, 1994	This Is Your Life	"Charlton Heston"	Himself
May 1, 1994	SeaQuest DSV	"Abalon"	Abalon
December 26, 1994	The Great Battles of the Civil War	(documentary)	Abraham Lincoln (voice)
January 22, 1995	The Avenging Angel	(TV movie)	Brigham Young
April 16, 1995	Texas aka James A. Michener's Texas	(TV mini-series)	Narrator (voice)
November 17, 1995	Clive Anderson Talks Back	"Episode #10.8"	Himself
December 2, 1995	Corazón, corazón	"Episode: December 2, 1995"	Himself
January 22, 1996	Àngels de nit	"Episode #1.2"	Himself
February 25, 1996	The Mysterious Origins of Man	(documentary)	Host
February 25, 1996	Ruby Wax Meets...	"Goldie Hawn"	Himself
December 2, 1996	Corazón, corazón	"Episode: December 2, 1996"	Himself
January 17, 1997	Dennis Miller Live	"Gun Control"	Himself
March 17, 1997	Biography	"Sophia Loren: Actress Italian Style"	Himself
June 4, 1997	The Rosie O'Donnell Show	"Episode:June 4, 1997"	Himself
December 5, 1997	Space Ghost Coast to Coast	"Dam"	Himself
January 1, 1998	Private Screenings	"Charlton Heston"	Himself
February 5, 1998	Friends	"The One with Joey's Dirty Day"	Himself
March 15, 1998	Biography	"John Wayne: American Legend"	Himself
July 13, 1998	Secrets of War	(documentary)	Narrator (voice)
August 13, 1998	Biography	"Rex Harrison: The Man Who Would Be King"	Himself
September 1, 1998	Bagpipe: Instrument of War – Part 1	(documentary)	Narrator (voice)
October 8, 1998	Late Night with Conan O'Brien	"Episode: October 8, 1998"	Himself
October 8, 1998	Biography	"Roddy McDowall: Hollywood's Best Friend"	Himself
May 8, 1999	The Howard Stern Radio Show	"Episode: May 8, 1999"	Himself
September 1, 1999	Bagpipe: Instrument of War – Part 2	(documentary)	Narrator (voice)
December 4, 1999	Camino de Santiago	(TV mini-series)	Professor Marcelo Rinaldi
September 3, 2000	The Outer Limits	"Final Appeal"	Chief Justice Haden Wainwright
December 14, 2000	Cursed	"...And Then Larry Brought; Charlton Heston Home"	Himself
January 1, 2001	Intimate Portrait	"Shirley Jones"	Himself
August 18, 2001	Biography	"Jennifer Jones: Portrait of a Lady"	Himself
November 24, 2001	Mad TV	(comedy)	Himself
January 1, 2002	Film Genre	"Epic"	Himself
December 20, 2002	20/20	"Episode: December 20, 2002"	Himself

== Radio ==
Selected appearances:

Date	Series	Episode	Role	Co-star
September 21, 1952	Hollywood Star Playhouse	"The Last Chance"		
November 3, 1952	Lux Radio Theatre	"Viva Zapata!"	Emiliano Zapata	Jean Peters
February 2, 1953	Lux Radio Theatre	"Captain Carey, U.S.A."	Webster Carey	Wanda Hendrix
September 28, 1953	Lux Radio Theatre	"The President's Lady"	Andrew Jackson	Joan Fontaine
June 7, 1954	Lux Radio Theatre	"The Naked Jungle"	Christopher Leiningen	Donna Reed
December 14, 1954	Lux Radio Theatre	"Secret of the Incas"	Harry Steele	Nicole Maurey
