= John Castle =

English actor (born 1940)

- Born: John Michael Frederick Castle; 14 January 1940 (age 86); Croydon, Surrey, England
- Education: Brighton College; Trinity College Dublin; Royal Academy of Dramatic Art
- Occupation: Actor
- Years active: 1964–2013

John Michael Frederick Castle (born 14 January 1940) is an English actor. He is best known for his film and television work, most notably playing Bill in Michelangelo Antonioni's Blowup (1966) and Geoffrey in The Lion in Winter (1968). Other significant credits include Man of La Mancha (1972), I, Claudius (1976) and RoboCop 3 (1993). He is also a noted voice actor and has recorded an audiobook version of Vanity Fair.

== Early life ==
Born in Croydon, Castle was educated at Brighton College and Trinity College, Dublin, and trained at the Royal Academy of Dramatic Art (RADA).

== Career ==
Castle's first appearance was as Westmoreland on stage in Henry V on 5 June 1964, at the Open Air Theatre, Regent's Park. He was 24 years old. His first Broadway theatre appearance was in February 1970 as "Jos" in the short-lived musical Georgy.

His screen debut was in Michelangelo Antonioni's 1966 film Blowup playing David Hemmings' artist friend, Bill. In 1968, he portrayed the plotting Prince Geoffrey in the film adaptation of The Lion in Winter, starring Peter O'Toole and Katharine Hepburn. According to Rotten Tomatoes, The Lion in Winter is Castle's "highest-rated" film. Also in 1967, he appeared in the British TV series The Prisoner as Number 12, a sympathetic guardian in the episode entitled "The General". Castle also played the role of Octavius Caesar in Charlton Heston's film version of Antony and Cleopatra (1972), as well as the role of Postumus Agrippa in the 1976 BBC series I, Claudius.

Castle made two appearances in the hard-hitting police drama The Professionals. In his first appearance he played CI5 Officer Tommy McKay in the episode "Heroes", whilst his subsequent appearance saw him in the role of Peter Crabbe, an underworld hitman in the episode "Man Without a Past".

Castle appeared as Carruthers, the most honourable of a trio of schemers, in an episode of Granada Television's series Sherlock Holmes ("The Solitary Cyclist", 1984). His association with Sherlock Holmes continued with his role as Nigel St Clair in the film version of The Crucifer of Blood (1991).

He played Inspector Craddock in an adaptation of the Agatha Christie story A Murder is Announced (1985), a role he recreated in the Miss Marple mystery The Mirror Crack'd from Side to Side (1992). He also played the title role in the 2000 made-for-TV version of Christie's Lord Edgware Dies. In 1990 Castle starred as Superintendent George Thorne in the BBC's radio adaptations of John Penn's novels. Castle appeared in other TV series, including Ben Hall and Lost Empires.

Among Castle's stage performances was his role as Oswald in the Royal Shakespeare Company's revival of Ibsen's Ghosts in 1967. He played the title character in the play about Mohandas Gandhi (Gandhi, by Guerney Campbell), performed in 1982 at the Tricycle Theatre in London, under the direction of Peter Stevenson.

== Personal life ==
Castle is married to writer Maggie Wadey.

== Selected filmography ==
=== Film ===
- Blowup (1966) – Bill
- The Lion in Winter (1968) – Geoffrey
- The Promise (1969) – Marat Yestigneyev
- Antony and Cleopatra (1972) – Octavius Caesar
- Made (1972) – Father Dyson
- Man of La Mancha (1972) – Sanson Carrasco / The Duke
- The Incredible Sarah (1976) – Damala
- Eliza Fraser (1976) – Captain Rory McBride
- Eagle's Wing (1979) – The Priest
- Never Never Land (1980) – Jim
- King David (1985) – Abner
- Dealers (1989) – Frank Mallory
- RoboCop 3 (1993) – Paul McDaggett
- Sparrow (1993) – Giuseppe
- Merisairas (1996) – Chief Engineer Josif Mantz
- Gods and Generals (2003) – Brig. Gen. William N. Pendleton
- I Against I (2012) – Tommy Carmichael

=== Television ===
- The Prisoner (1967) – Number Twelve in the episode "The General"
- The Shadow of the Tower (1972) – Thomas Flamank
- Softly, Softly (1973) – Billy Mason
- Ben Hall (TV series) (1975, ABC, BBC, 20th Century Fox) – Frank Gardiner
- Warship (1975) – Lieutenant-Commander Peter Tremayne, officer commanding the Royal Navy submarine HMS Ovid in the episode "Under the Surface"
- I, Claudius (1976) – Agrippa Postumus
- The New Avengers (1976) – Colonel Miller in the episode "Dirtier by the dozen"
- The Three Hostages (1977) – Dominick Medina
- 1990 (1977) – Philip Carter
- The Prime of Miss Jean Brodie (1978) – Teddy Lloyd
- Lillie (1978) – Prince Louis of Battenberg
- The Professionals (1978) — CI5 Agent Tommy McKay ('Shotgun Tommy') in A05 "Heroes"; Peter Crabbe in B04 "Man Without a Past"
- Tales of the Unexpected – "Fat Chance" (1980) – John Burge
- Strangers (1982) – Martin Hargreaves
- Reilly, Ace of Spies (1983) – Count Massino
- The Adventures of Sherlock Holmes "The Solitary Cyclist" (1984) – Carruthers
- Miss Marple Series 1 Episode 1: "A Murder is Announced" (1985) – Detective Inspector Craddock
- Lost Empires with Laurence Olivier and Colin Firth (1986)
- Tales of the Unexpected
- The Crucifer of Blood (1991) – Neville St Clair
- Inspector Morse Series 5 Episode 3: "Who Killed Harry Field?" (1991) – Tony Doyle
- Miss Marple "The Mirror Crack'd from Side to Side" (1992) – Detective Inspector Craddock
- Lovejoy (1994) Series 6, Episode 2: Day of Reckoning – Max Hunter
- Bramwell (1994) – Guy Le Saux
- Little Lord Fauntleroy (1995) – Mr. Havisham
- Pie in the Sky (1996) – Charles Rider
- The Ruth Rendell Mysteries (1997) – Mark in the episode "A Dark Blue Perfume"
- Wycliffe (1998, HTV for ITV) – Land's End – Peter Selby
- Catherine Cookson's A Dinner of Herbs (2000) – Alfred Cottle
- Agatha Christie's Poirot Season 8 Episode 2: "Lord Edgware Dies" (2000) – Lord Edgware
- Nova (2000, Public Broadcasting Service) – David Irving
- Casualty (2004) – Brian 'Bullet' Taylor
- The Princes in The Tower (2005, Channel 4 production) – Dr John Argentine
- Spooks (2006) – Jocelyn Myers
- Midsomer Murders Series 10 Episode 3: King's Crystal (2007) – Charles King
- A Touch of Frost (2008) Mind Games – Charlie Collingham
- The Tractate Middoth (2013, BBC) – John Eldred
