= The Crucifer of Blood =

Play by Paul Giovanni

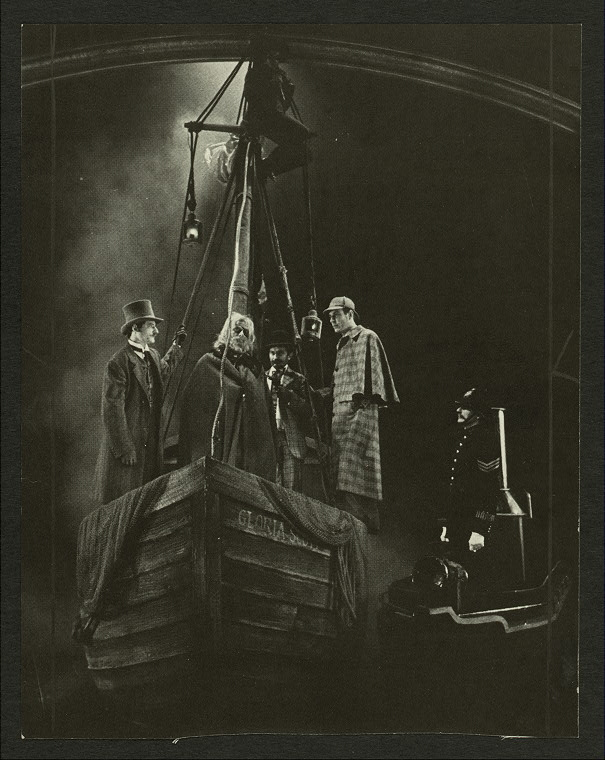
Scene from The Crucifer of Blood (1978)

The Crucifer of Blood is a play by Paul Giovanni that is adapted from the Arthur Conan Doyle novel The Sign of the Four. It depicts the character Irene St. Claire hiring the detective Sherlock Holmes to investigate the travails that her father and his three compatriots suffered over a pact made over a cursed treasure chest in colonial India during the Indian Rebellion of 1857.

== Broadway production ==
The play, directed by the author, opened on Broadway at the Helen Hayes Theatre on September 28, 1978, and ran for 236 performances.

The production was nominated for four Tony Awards, including Giovanni for Best Direction of a Play, and won the award for Roger Morgan's lighting design. It also received Drama Desk Awards for Morgan as well as for John Wulp's scenic design. Bran Ferren received the Los Angeles Drama Critics Circle award for Special Visual & Sound Effects.

=== Cast ===
- Paxton Whitehead – Sherlock Holmes
- Glenn Close – Irene St. Claire
- Christopher Curry – Jonathan Small
- Andrew Davis – Mohammed Singh & Mordecai Smith
- Martin LaPlatney – Hopkins
- Timothy Landfield – John Watson, M.D.
- Melvin Lum – Fung Tching, A Chinaman
- Tuck Milligan – Wali Dad & Birdy Johnson
- Roumel Reaux – Tonga
- Dwight Schultz – Major Alistair Ross
- Nicolas Surovy – Captain Neville St. Claire
- Edward Zang – Durga Dass & Inspector Lestrade

== London production ==
The play, directed by the author, opened in London at the Theatre Royal Haymarket on March 15, 1979, and ran for 397 performances. Denis Lill, who played Dr. Watson, would later go on to play Inspector Bradstreet in Sherlock Holmes (1984 TV series). In September 1979, the roles of Holmes, Watson and Irene were taken over by Gerald Harper, David Horovitch and Kate O'Mara respectively.

=== Cast ===
- Keith Michell - Sherlock Holmes
- Susan Hampshire - Irene St. Claire
- Nicholas Day - Jonathan Small
- Geoffrey Snell - Mohammed Singh & Mordecai Smith
- James Curran - Hopkins
- Denis Lill - John Watson, M.D.
- Klim Leh T'Chei - Fung Tching, a Chinaman
- Billy McColl - Wali Dad & Birdy Johnson
- Reis Etan - Tonga
- John Quentin - Major Alistair Ross
- Edward Petherbridge - Captain Neville St. Claire
- John Cater - Durga Dass & Inspector Lestrade

== Los Angeles production ==
The play, directed by the author, premiered in Los Angeles at the Ahmanson Theatre in the Los Angeles Music Center on December 5, 1980, and ran through January 17, 1981. A notable feature of this production was that Jeremy Brett, who later became one of the most famous portrayers of Sherlock Holmes, played Dr. Watson.

=== Cast ===
- Charlton Heston - Sherlock Holmes
- Jeremy Brett - John Watson, M.D.
- Suzanne Lederer - Irene St. Claire
- Christopher Curry - Jonathan Small
- J. Christopher O'Connor - Mohammed Singh
- Richard Denison - Hopkins
- Liu Han T'Seng - Fung Tching, a Chinaman
- Ronald Dennis - Tonga
- Dwight Schultz - Major Alistair Ross
- Ian Abercrombie - Durga Dass & Inspector Lestrade
- Alan Coates - Captain Neville St. Claire
- Tuck Milligan - Wali Dad & Birdy Johnson
- C. Edward Pogue - Mordecai Smith

== Film ==
The Cruifer of Blood was adapted into a television movie for Turner Network Television and first broadcast on November 4, 1991. The cast featured Charlton Heston as Holmes, Richard Johnson as Watson, Clive Wood as Small, John Castle as St. Clair, Edward Fox as Ross, Simon Callow as Inspector Lestrade, Susannah Harker as Irene St. Claire, Stefan Kalipha as Wali Dad, Kaleem Janjua as Durga Das, Lloyd McGuire as Kiran Shah, Sidney Livingstone as Roly Lamas Dir, and James Coyle as Birdy Johnson. It was directed by Heston's son Fraser Clarke Heston.
