= Andrew Scheinman =

American film and television producer

- Education: Juris Doctor
- Alma mater: University of Virginia School of Law (1973)
- Occupations: Film producer, television producer, film director, screenwriter

Andrew Scheinman is an American film and television producer, as well as a film director and screenwriter. Before he got his start in entertainment, he worked as a professional tennis player, as well as earning a JD from the University of Virginia School of Law in 1973. He is one of the heads of Castle Rock Entertainment.

He won an Emmy Award for producing Seinfeld and was nominated for an Academy Award for producing A Few Good Men.

Scheinman, formerly a member of Writers Guild of America West, left and maintained financial core status in 2009.

== Filmography ==
He was producer for all films unless otherwise noted.

=== Film ===
Year	Film	Credit
1980	The Mountain Men	
1980	The Awakening	Co-producer
1981	Modern Romance	
1985	The Sure Thing	Co-producer
1986	Stand by Me	
1987	The Princess Bride	Co-producer
1989	When Harry Met Sally...	
1990	Misery	
1992	A Few Good Men	
1994	North	Executive producer
1996	Extreme Measures	Executive producer
1996	Ghosts of Mississippi	
2014	And So It Goes	Executive producer

As writer

Year	Film	Notes
1994	North	
2000	Bait	
2004	Kangaroo Jack: G'Day U.S.A.!	Direct-to-video
2010	Flipped	
2012	The Magic of Belle Isle	Uncredited

As director

Year	Film
1994	Little Big League

Script and continuity department

Year	Film	Role	Notes
2007	The Bucket List	Script revisions	Uncredited

Miscellaneous crew

Year	Film	Role
1982	Mother Lode	Presenter

Thanks

Year	Film	Role
2003	A Mighty Wind	Special thanks: Castle Rock

=== Television ===
Year	Title	Credit
1991−93	Seinfeld	Executive producer

As writer

Year	Title
1989	Homeroom
