= While I Run This Race =

1967 film

- Directed by: Edmond Levy
- Produced by: Carl V. Ragsdale
- Narrated by: Charlton Heston
- Cinematography: Ross Lowell
- Production company: Sun Dial Films
- Distributed by: Office of Economic Opportunity
- Release date: 1967
- Country: United States
- Language: English

While I Run This Race is a 1967 American short documentary film about poverty in the United States directed by Edmond Levy. It was nominated for an Academy Award for Best Documentary Short.

== See also ==
- Charlton Heston filmography
