= Lydia Clarke =

American actress and photographer (1923-2018)

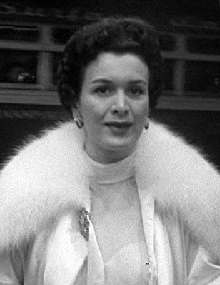
- Clarke in 1956
- Born: Lydia Marie Clarke; April 14, 1923; Two Rivers, Wisconsin, U.S.
- Died: September 3, 2018 (aged 95); Santa Monica, California, U.S.
- Occupation: Actress
- Years active: 1950–2001
- Spouse: Charlton Heston (m. 1944; died 2008)
- Children: 2, including Fraser Clarke Heston

Lydia Marie Clarke Heston (April 14, 1923 – September 3, 2018) was an American actress and photographer. She was the wife of actor Charlton Heston.

== Biography ==
Clarke attended high school in Lexington, Kentucky, and graduated from Northwestern University.

A comment by Carl Sandburg after he saw her perform with the Asheville Little Theatre led her to change her career plans from practicing law to acting.

On Broadway, Clarke portrayed Mary McLeod in Detective Story (1949). She appeared on Studio One on television. Her film debut came in The Greatest Show on Earth (1952).

Clarke took photographs "all over the world, recording everything from Afghan refugees in the Khyber Pass to the fellahin in their Nile villages." Time and Fortune were among the magazines that published her work. She also exhibited her photographs in museums and galleries and had her work published in two books.

She married actor Charlton Heston on March 17, 1944, at Grace Methodist Church in Greensboro, North Carolina, and their marriage lasted for 64 years until his death on April 5, 2008. They had two children: Fraser Clarke Heston and Holly Heston Rochell.

Clarke and Heston were co-directors and acted at the Thomas Wolfe Memorial Theatre in Asheville, North Carolina.

Clarke died from complications due to pneumonia on September 3, 2018, at UCLA Medical Center, in Santa Monica, California, at the age of 95. She was a breast cancer survivor and had undergone a mastectomy.

== Filmography ==
=== Film ===
Year	Title	Role	Notes
1952	The Greatest Show on Earth	Circus girl	Uncredited
1952	The Atomic City	Martha Addison	
1952	Bad for Each Other	Rita Thornburg	
1968	Will Penny	Mrs. Fraker	
1971	The Omega Man	—N/a	Still photographer
1982	Mother Lode	—N/a	Still photographer

=== Television ===
Year	Title	Role	Notes
1950–1952	Studio One	Various characters	2 episodes
1953	The Philco Television Playhouse	—N/a	Episode: "Elegy"
