= The Crucifer of Blood (film) =

1991 film by Fraser Clarke Heston

- Based on: The Crucifer of Blood by Paul Giovanni; Sherlock Holmes characters by Sir Arthur Conan Doyle
- Screenplay by: Paul Giovanni; Fraser C. Heston
- Directed by: Fraser Clarke Heston (as Fraser C. Heston)
- Starring: Charlton Heston; Richard Johnson; Edward Fox; Simon Callow
- Music by: Carl Davis
- Countries of origin: United States; United Kingdom
- Original language: English

Production
- Producer: Fraser C. Heston
- Cinematography: Robin Vidgeon
- Editor: Eric Boyd-Perkins
- Running time: 103 minutes
- Production companies: Turner Pictures; British Lion

Original release
- Network: TNT
- Release: November 14, 1991

The Crucifer of Blood is a 1991 TV movie based on the play of the same name by Paul Giovanni, who wrote the screenplay along with Fraser C. Heston, who directed the picture. The play and film are an adaptation of Arthur Conan Doyle's The Sign of the Four.

Charlton Heston, the father of Fraser Heston, plays Sherlock Holmes, a role he first played in a Los Angeles production of Giovanni's play. Richard Johnson co-stars as Dr. Watson and Simon Callow plays Inspector Lestrade.

The film was made in England by British Lion and Turner Films for cable television, and was first broadcast on TNT on November 14, 1991.

== Plot ==
A beautiful young woman asks Holmes to help her father, a former army captain and hopeless opium addict break free of the curse surrounding a treasure stolen decades ago, when he was stationed in India during The Raj.

== Cast ==
- Charlton Heston as Sherlock Holmes
- Richard Johnson as Dr. Watson
- Edward Fox as Alistair St. Claire
- Susannah Harker as Irene St. Claire
- Simon Callow as Inspector Lestrade

== Production ==
The play, directed by the author, premiered in Los Angeles at the Ahmanson Theatre in the Los Angeles Music Center on December 5, 1980, and ran through January 17, 1981. Charlton Heston played Sherlock Holmes and Jeremy Brett, who later became one of the most famous portrayers of the Victorian consulting detective, played Dr. Watson.

Frasier Heston had written the script for 1980 movie The Mountain Men that had starred Charlton Heston, and had produced his father's TV adaptation of A Man For All Seasons (1988). He directed his father as Long John Silver in an adaptation of Treasure Island for TNT the year before helming The Crucifer of Blood.

Prior to their pairing as Holmes and Watson, Heston and Johnson had worked together several times before. Their collaborations included 1966's Khartoum, 1970's Julius Caesar, the 1988 TV movie A Man for All Seasons (which Heston himself directed), and the aforementioned Treasure Island.
