= Bad for Each Other =

1953 film by Irving Rapper

- Directed by: Irving Rapper
- Screenplay by: Irving Wallace; Horace McCoy
- Based on: Scalpel; 1952 novel by Horace McCoy
- Produced by: William Fadiman
- Starring: Charlton Heston; Lizabeth Scott; Dianne Foster
- Cinematography: Franz Planer
- Edited by: Al Clark
- Music by: Mischa Bakaleinikoff
- Production company: Columbia Pictures
- Distributed by: Columbia Pictures
- Release date: December 24, 1953 (New York City)
- Running time: 82 minutes
- Country: United States
- Language: English

Bad for Each Other is a 1953 American drama film noir directed by Irving Rapper and starring Charlton Heston, Lizabeth Scott and Dianne Foster. It was produced and distributed by Columbia Pictures. Its genre has been characterized as a "medical melodrama" with a film noir "bad girl".

== Plot ==
Army colonel and doctor Tom Owen returns home to Coalville, Pennsylvania, on leave. He learns from wealthy mine owner Dan Reasonover that his brother Floyd, a mine safety engineer, has been killed in an explosion. He further discovers that Floyd had betrayed Dan's trust by purchasing substandard equipment and taking kickbacks. Tom discovers that Floyd was also heavily in debt at the time. Tom wants to pay Dan back, but the latter declines his offer.

Dan's daughter, the twice-divorced socialite Helen Curtis, meets Tom at a party and asks him for a date. She arranges for him to meet Dr. Homer Gleeson, who runs a Pittsburgh clinic catering to wealthy women suffering from minor ailments (some of which are plainly imaginary). Gleeson informs Tom that his former associate has quit to open his own practice, so he offers Tom the vacancy. Knowing that Tom has vowed to pay his late brother's debts, Helen talks him into accepting. Tom appears reluctant at first but eventually turns down the security his army career offers and accepts Gleeson's job. This disappoints Tom's mother who had hoped he would return to Coalville where he could do some genuine good. Tom informs her that he is doing this for the money.

As a nurse to assist him, Tom hires Joan Lasher, an idealistic young woman who plans to become a doctor herself. Meanwhile, Tom and Helen begin dating. Tom proposes marriage and Helen accepts. Dan attempts to intervene and dissuade Tom from proceeding with the marriage. He warns Tom that Helen's wealth poisoned her first two marriages, but Tom remains adamant that this won't happen. Lasher becomes disappointed that Tom treats wealthy society patients for minor ailments when he could be doing better elsewhere. Dr. Jim Crowley, a former sergeant in Tom's squad approaches Tom for help. He is trying to secure a position as a doctor. Tom half-heartedly offers to help Jim who, disappointed by his reception, goes to leave. On the way out he bumps into Joan who informs him that Tom is a good doctor and would not have offered assistance unless he meant to follow through. Jim explains that he only returned to the medical field after witnessing Tom in action in the war. Tom had inspired him to give medicine another chance and to treat the truly needy.

Joan confronts Tom and explains Jim's inspirational story and Tom agrees to send Jim to see Dr. Lester Scobee, who cares for the miners of Coalville and their families. Jim is hired and starts to see more and more cases of men from the mine developing lung conditions. He approaches Tom with some X-rays. Before Tom can review the X-rays, he gets a call from Helen who is with her aunt who has become ill. Tom rushes out and after examining Helen's rich and influential aunt, Mrs. Roger Nelson, discovers that she is ill and in dire need of emergency surgery. Mrs. Nelson insists on not proceeding until she sees her personal physician Dr. Gleeson. Tom explains to Gleeson that the surgery is required, and Gleeson admits that he is not equipped to perform surgery and that he actually has not performed any surgery in over ten years. Instead, his former partner had been the surgeon. Tom performs the surgery, saving Mrs. Nelson, and Gleeson urges Tom to allow him to take credit. Tom resists at first but eventually agrees to do this. Later, Joan upbraids Tom for this unethical behavior and quits the surgery.

Gleeson decides to charge Mrs. Nelson an exorbitant fee, which he splits with Tom. Mrs. Nelson later learns that it was Tom who performed her operation and questions his ethics. Before Tom can defend himself, he is called away to help at a mine explosion at Coalville. Tom enters the mine and joins Jim treating and rescuing miners underground. They rescue the miners, but Jim is fatally injured. Tom tells Helen he is quitting the Pittsburgh clinic to work in Coalville. Helen tells him she cannot live there, so they reluctantly part. Tom arrives at his new office to find Joan already at work.

== Cast ==
- Charlton Heston as Dr. Tom Owen
- Lizabeth Scott as Helen Curtis
- Dianne Foster as Joan Lasher
- Mildred Dunnock as Mrs. Mary Owen
- Arthur Franz as Dr. Jim Crowley
- Ray Collins as Dan Reasonover
- Marjorie Rambeau as Mrs. Roger Nelson
- Lester Matthews as Dr. Homer Gleeson
- Rhys Williams as Dr. Leslie M. Scobee
- Lydia Clarke as Rita Thronburg
- Lisa Golm as Mrs. Marzano

== Screenplay and development ==
The screenplay was adapted from Scalpel, an unpublished novel by Horace McCoy, to which Hal Wallis bought the rights for Paramount Pictures for $100,000 in 1951, by McCoy and Irving Wallace after Columbia acquired the rights in 1953.

It mirrored the plot of the 1938 British film The Citadel closely enough for one reference work to call it "the poor man's version" of that film.

The film's trailer promoted it as an exposé of "ghost surgeons" in the contemporary medical profession, the practice of a doctor misrepresenting himself to a patient and taking credit for surgery performed by someone else. The practice was a topic much discussed and condemned at the time. The American College of Surgeons condemned the practice in 1951.

== Reception ==
Writing in The New York Times, Howard Thompson called the film "erratic" and recapped its plot as a "romanticized endorsement of the Hippocratic Oath, as opposed to cash in the bank". He nevertheless allowed that the film had merits: "the lacquered, carefully engineered proceedings have their persuasive aspects". He singled out "bits and snatches" of the dialogue and the acting of all but the two leads. He preferred the plot of the doctor's career choice dilemma to the romance of the title: "The hero's liaison with the tippling, muddle-headed Miss Scott takes up a good, pointless third of the footage."

TV Guide calls it a "real bore" that "may be dangerous to your health", says Heston "has never been stiffer or more self-righteous", but that "[s]ome excellent character actors are totally wasted in this film". Others have complained that the film's title misrepresents it. Turner Classic Movies calls it "obscure and forgotten".
