= Antony and Cleopatra (1972 film) =

1972 film by Charlton Heston

- Directed by: Charlton Heston
- Written by: Federico De Urrutia; Charlton Heston
- Based on: Antony and Cleopatra by William Shakespeare
- Produced by: Peter Snell
- Starring: Charlton Heston; Hildegarde Neil; Eric Porter; John Castle; Fernando Rey; Juan Luis Galiardo; Carmen Sevilla
- Cinematography: Rafael Pacheco
- Edited by: Eric Boyd-Perkins
- Music by: John Scott
- Production company: Rank Organisation
- Distributed by: Rank Organisation (UK)
- Release date: 2 March 1972 (UK)
- Running time: 160 minutes
- Countries: United Kingdom; Spain; Switzerland
- Language: English
- Budget: $1.8 million

Antony and Cleopatra is a 1972 film adaptation of the play of the same name by William Shakespeare, directed by and starring Charlton Heston, and made by the Rank Organisation. Heston and Hildegarde Neil portray the titular roles of Mark Antony and Cleopatra, with a supporting cast featuring Eric Porter, John Castle, Fernando Rey, Carmen Sevilla, Freddie Jones, Peter Arne, Douglas Wilmer, Julian Glover and Roger Delgado. The picture was produced by Peter Snell from a screenplay by Federico De Urrutia and the director.

== Plot ==
In Egypt, messengers from Rome arrive to inform Mark Antony, a Roman general and member of the Second Triumvirate, of Rome's political affairs. Antony, who has fallen in love with Cleopatra, the Queen of Egypt, is uninterested but Cleopatra persuades him to listen. Proculeius informs Antony that his wife Fulvia has died after she and Antony's brother Lucius Antonius had rebelled against Octavius, another triumvir.

In Rome, Octavius notifies Lepidus, the third triumvir, that Antony has abandoned his responsibilities. Lepidus defends Antony's weaknesses, and the two agree to raise an army against Sextus Pompey. Antony returns to Rome to amend relations with Octavius, in which Agrippa suggests Antony marry Octavius's sister Octavia. Before battle, the triumvirs meet with Pompey and offer him control of Sicily and Sardinia on the condition he drives out the pirates and pay tribute. After some hesitation, Sextus agrees. They engage in a drunken celebration on Sextus' galley. Meanwhile, Menas suggests to Sextus that he defeat his political rivals and make himself ruler of the Roman Republic, but Sextus refuses.

Back in Egypt, Cleopatra learns Antony's marriage to Octavia and strikes her messenger for delivering the news. She sends her messenger to witness the marriage union in Rome, in which the messenger then returns to Egypt and describes Octavia's physical features. While in Rome, Antony asks a soothsayer whether his or Octavius's fortunes will rise. The soothsayer replies in favor of Octavius and advises Antony to keep his distance. Antony then returns to Egypt and reunites with Cleopatra, where he crowns her and himself as coregents of Egypt. In the wake, Octavius finds Antony is displeased with his allocation of Sextus Pompey's territories and dictates that Lepidus be disposed as triumvirate.

Octavius agrees with the latter demand but declares war against Antony. Enobarbus urges Antony to fight on land, believing that Octavius's naval forces hold the greater advantage. Antony however refuses and battles Octavius's forces in the Battle of Actium, with assistance from Cleopatra's fleet. During the battle, Cleopatra's fleet withdraws and Antony follows, leaving his forces defeated. Antony returns to the palace and lies in shame accusing himself of dishonor. Cleopatra comforts Antony, and as the two kiss, he remarks that even her kiss repays him for his shame.

On the eve of battle, Antony sends the soothsayer requesting a truce, but Octavius declines. Octavius then sends Thidias, a messenger, to ask Cleopatra to give up Antony and switch sides. She hesitates and flirts with the messenger until Antony walks in and angrily denounces her behavior. He has Thidias whipped. Eventually, Antony forgives Cleopatra. The next day, Antony challenges Octavius, whose forces are near Alexandria, to a one-on-one combat. Antony's forces depart to battle Octavius's on land while Enobarbus stays behind. Believing Antony's forces will fall to Octavius, Enobarbus throws himself off a cliff and dies.

Antony loses the battle and as he deserts en masse, he denounces Cleopatra for betrayal. Inside the palace, Cleopatra locks herself inside a monument, and sends her messenger to falsely inform Antony of her death. Believing she has died, Antony requests Eros, his aide, to impale him with his sword. Eros declines and instead impales himself, leaving Antony to do it himself. As Antony bleeds, the soothsayer informs him that Cleopatra is still alive. A dying Antony returns to Cleopatra and dies in her arms.

Octavius is informed of Antony's death and sends Proculeius to demand for Cleopatra's surrender. Cleopatra tries to take her own life but is prevented. Sometime later, Octavius arrives and assures her that as his prisoner of war, she will be treated with respect. Cleopatra imagines she will be humiliated and proceeds to kill herself through the venomous bite of an asp. Her handmaidens Charmian and Iras follow her in death. Upon learning of Cleopatra's death, Octavius decides to have her buried next to Antony.

== Cast ==
- Charlton Heston as Mark Antony
- Hildegarde Neil as Cleopatra
- Eric Porter as Enobarbus
- John Castle as Octavius Caesar
- Fernando Rey as Lepidus
- Carmen Sevilla as Octavia
- Freddie Jones as Sextus Pompey
- Peter Arne as Menas
- Douglas Wilmer as Agrippa
- Roger Delgado as Soothsayer
- Julian Glover as Proculeius

== Production ==
The film was produced by Peter Snell, who had just made another film adaptation of a Shakespeare play with Charlton Heston, Julius Caesar. Heston had played the role of Marc Antony in that movie, as well as other adaptations of Julius Caesar. He had appeared in Antony and Cleopatra on Broadway with Katherine Cornell, in a small role, and loved the play. Heston and Snell decided to make a film of Anthony and Cleopatra.

Heston adapted the play into a screenplay himself, working on it in 1969. He wrote in his diary that this was "one of the most satisfying experiences in my career" calling the original text "the most filmable of all Shakespeare’s plays. He has been described as the first screenwriter. If so, this is his best screenplay."

Heston originally considered Jack Gold to direct and for several months in early 1970 it seemed this might happen. Peter Grenville was also considered. In Heston's diaries he saw Chimes and Midnight in September 1970 and was so impressed he decided to offer the job of directing to Orson Welles. Welles was interested but by the end of October said he was unavailable so Heston decided to do it himself.

Heston asked Laurence Olivier and Orson Welles to direct but both turned it down, so he decided to do it himself. He said both men advised him to make it only if Heston found a "great" Cleopatra. In his diaries, Heston mentions considering Irene Pappas, Anne Bancroft and Sophia Loren and Susannah York; he dismissed Glenda Jackson after seeing Women in Love although later said this was a mistake, and thought Barbara Jefford was not sexy enough. He filmed tests of Barbara Jefford and Hildegarde Neil and eventually cast the latter.

Raising finance was difficult with Commonwealth United promising support then withdrawing. On 24 June 1970 Heston wrote "I have to make this picture... I think it can be the best picture I ever made... and I hope, desperately, that someone with a million and a half dollars thinks so too." Eventually distributors in 21 countries put up 65 percent of the $1.8 million budget (which was actually $2.7 million but Heston and Snell deferred their fees). A bank put up the remainder 35 percent.

Some finance came from Rank.

The film was shot in Spain. Heston re-used leftover footage of the sea battle from his 1959 film Ben-Hur as well as outtakes from the 1963 film Cleopatra.

Charlton Heston had played Mark Antony in two previous Shakespearean films, both adaptations of Julius Caesar, the first in 1950, the second in 1970 (also produced by Peter Snell).

== Reception ==
The film was a box office bomb, receiving poor reviews and failing to attract audiences, which led to the film withdrawing from theatres.

In 2023, the film was featured in a MovieWeb list of "10 Best Movies about Cleopatra, Ranked". MovieWeb also said of it: "[w]ith great costumes and lavish sets, it's a great film that is underrated".

== Home video ==
The film received poor reviews and, as a consequence, a very limited release in the United States. It was released on DVD in March 2011.

== Notes ==
- Heston, Charlton (1979). The actor's life : journals, 1956-1976. Pocket Books.
