= The Mountain Men =

1980 film by Richard Lang

- Theatrical release poster
- Directed by: Richard Lang
- Written by: Fraser Clarke Heston
- Produced by: Martin Shafer; Andrew Scheinman
- Starring: Charlton Heston; Brian Keith; Stephen Macht
- Cinematography: Michel Hugo
- Edited by: Eva Ruggiero
- Music by: Michel Legrand
- Color process: Metrocolor
- Production company: Polyc International BV
- Distributed by: Columbia Pictures
- Release date: June 1, 1980
- Running time: 100 minutes
- Country: United States
- Language: English
- Box office: $6 million

The Mountain Men is a 1980 American adventure Western film directed by Richard Lang and starring Charlton Heston and Brian Keith. Heston's son, Fraser Clarke Heston, wrote the screenplay.

== Plot ==
Bill Tyler is an argumentative, curmudgeonly mountain man. Henry Frapp is Tyler's good friend and fellow trapper. Together, they trap beaver, fight Native Americans, and drink at a mountain man rendezvous while trying to sell their "plews", or beaver skins, to a cutthroat French trader named Fontenelle.

Tyler looks for a legendary valley in Blackfoot territory "so full of beaver that they just jump in the traps." Running Moon leaves her abusive husband, a ruthless Blackfoot warrior named Heavy Eagle, and comes across the two trappers in the dying days of the fur trapping era. While at first Bill only wants to take her to safety at the rendezvous, she refuses to leave and eventually becomes his lover. While trapping, Bill and Henry are attacked by Blackfoot warriors and Henry is scalped by Heavy Eagle in front of Bill. Tyler runs back to camp and he and Running Moon flee only to be caught. Later, Tyler (thinking Running Moon has also been killed) is given a chance to run for his life (similar to the real life event of John Colter) and is chased by warriors whom he initially eludes by hiding in a beaver den. They pursue him until he and Heavy Eagle fall into a raging river. Heavy Eagle makes it to shore and Bill goes over a waterfall. Heavy Eagle returns to his camp and rapes Running Moon, but she refuses to submit to him. He knows Bill Tyler survived and will come for her, just as he had done previously.

On his survival trek, Bill comes across Henry, who had survived the scalping, and eventually learns that Running Moon is still alive. He and Henry set out to rescue her while they are followed by another pair of trappers, Le Bont and Walters, who are also looking for the valley of beavers. After Le Bont and Walters are killed by Heavy Eagle and his warriors, Henry is shot in the chest with an arrow and dies in Tyler's arms. Tyler then sneaks into the Blackfoot camp and finds Running Moon, but before they can escape, Heavy Eagle arrives. Tyler and Heavy Eagle engage in hand-to-hand combat, and just as Heavy Eagle is about to kill Tyler with a knife, Running Moon shoots him with a musket, killing him. Tyler constructs a traditional Blackfoot sky burial platform next to a river and places Henry's corpse on it before he and Running Moon ride away for the high country, in search of the beaver valley.

== Cast ==
- Charlton Heston as Bill Tyler
- Brian Keith as Henry Frapp
- Victoria Racimo as Running Moon
- Stephen Macht as Heavy Eagle
- John Glover as Nathan Wyeth
- Seymour Cassel as La Bont
- David Ackroyd as Medicine Wolf
- Cal Bellini as Cross Otter
- William Lucking as Jim Walter (as Bill Lucking)
- Ken Ruta as Fontenelle
- Victor Jory as Iron Belly
- Danny Zapien as Blackfoot Chief
- Tim Haldeman as Whiskey Clerk
- Buckley Norris as Trapper
- Daniel Knapp as Trapper
- Michael Greene as Trapper
- Stewart East as Trapper
- Terry Leonard as Crow Brave
- Steven Chambers as Blackfoot Brave (as Steve D. Chambers)
- Bennie Dobbins as Blackfoot Brave
- Suzanna Trujillo as Iron Belly's Squaw
- Melissa Sylvia as Frapp's Squaw
- James Ecoffey as Dog Of the Sun

== Production ==
This was an early script by Fraser Heston, son of Charlton Heston, and an enthusiastic outdoorsman in real life. He sold the script, originally called Wind River, to Martin Ransohoff, who set up the project at Columbia, and offered the lead role to Charlton Heston. Heston later recalled, "Fraser's script had, shall we say, an elegiac quality. That is very hard to capture on film, but I think we succeeded by shooting on wonderful, truly monumental locations."

The film was shot in Wyoming at Bridger-Teton National Forest, Grand Teton National Park, Shoshone National Forest and Yellowstone National Park.

According to Heston during post production "much of that wonderfully inspiring footage was cut and the editors focused on exploiting the raw action between" characters played by him and Brian Keith, which "violated the agreement I thought we had with Ransohoff about what the picture should be about."

== Reception ==
The film received mixed reviews with Michael Blowen of The Boston Globe writing that the picture "is, quite simply, the worst film of the year". Variety assessed the film as "loaded with vulgarities, bloody, and takes ages to drag from one plot development to another". Both Gene Siskel and Roger Ebert gave the film negative reviews, selecting it as one of their "dogs of the year" in a 1980 episode of Sneak Previews. Siskel added, "Heston has simply failed to grow up, this is a 1950s movie in its look, its comedy and in its racist attitude towards Indians. It portrays them in some battle scenes as shuffling freaks in redface." In his annual publication, Leonard Maltin rated the film "BOMB" and described it as "crude, bloody and tiresome good-guys-vs-Indians western".

Linda Gross of the Los Angeles Times gave a partially favorable review, writing that "for the most part, the film...is an enjoyable yarn". Marylynn Uricchio echoed the same assessment in The Pittsburgh Post-Gazette. In The New York Times, Janet Maslin praised the Wyoming scenery.

Heston said shortly after the film's release:

The film that you saw was not the film that we conceived or shot. We compromised. My son's script was much darker. It emphasized the sort of autumnal recognition that they earned as trappers. I confess that I miss that aspect bitterly. My son found it difficult to swallow. He poured everything into the script and he resented the changes. But all artists compromise. Every one of my films could have been better. Every one of them. My son learned that the people who put up the money control the film. When we saw the final cut, he was heartbroken.... I could have walked out. I could have put everything on the line but I don't like to do that. It was the director's (Richard Lang) first feature and I don't like to throw my weight around. But maybe I should have. Maybe I made a mistake.

In his 1995 memoir, Heston wrote that while he approved of the change of title, he disliked the print advertising and felt the editing "was pretty much slash-and-burn... a shocking violation of assurances Ransohoff had given me. It was my first and to this day the most outrageous encounter in this town with that kind of behavior. Mountain Men remains a bitter memory of what could've been a fine film."

== See also ==
- List of American films of 1980
