= Fraser Clarke Heston =

American film director

- Born: February 12, 1955 (age 71)
- Occupations: film director, film producer, screenwriter and actor
- Years active: 1955–present
- Known for: infant Moses in The Ten Commandments
- Notable work: produced his father's TV adaptation of A Man For All Seasons; directed his father as Long John Silver in a 1990 adaptation of Treasure Island; helmed The Crucifer of Blood starring his father as Sherlock Holmes
- Spouse: Marilyn Heston (m. 1980)
- Children: 1
- Parents: Charlton Heston (father); Lydia Clarke (mother)

Fraser Clarke Heston (born February 12, 1955) is an American film director, film producer, screenwriter and actor.

== Early life ==
Heston was born in 1955 to actors Charlton Heston and Lydia Clarke. He has a sister.

As a baby, Heston made his film debut as the infant Moses (his father played the grown Moses) in the Cecil B. DeMille epic The Ten Commandments.

== Work with his father ==
While in the process of writing Wind River, a romantic adventure novel about 19th-century fur trappers, Heston was convinced by producer Martin Shafer to turn the story into a film script. Discovering that film-writing came naturally for him, 22-year-old Heston wrote his first screenplay, The Mountain Men, for Columbia Pictures, which became the feature film.

Fraser Heston produced his father's TV adaptation of A Man For All Seasons (1988). He directed his father as Long John Silver in a 1990 adaptation of Treasure Island for TNT and helmed The Crucifer of Blood starring his father as Sherlock Holmes the following year.

== Other work ==
After directing 2nd unit work on City Slickers in Spain, Heston directed Needful Things (1993) and Alaska.

== Credits ==
=== Acting credit ===
- The Ten Commandments (1956) - The Infant Moses
- The Search for Michael Rockefeller (2010, documentary) - Narrator

=== Director credits ===
- Mother Lode (1982) (uncredited)
- Treasure Island (1990, TV movie)
- The Crucifer of Blood (1991, TV movie)
- City Slickers (1991, Pamplona, Spain crew, 2nd unit director)
- Needful Things (1993)
- Alaska (1996)
- The Search for Michael Rockefeller (2010, documentary)

=== Producer credits ===
- Mother Lode (1982)
- A Man for All Seasons (1988, TV movie)
- Treasure Island (1990, TV movie)
- The Crucifer of Blood (1991, TV movie)
- Charlton Heston Presents the Bible (1997, video documentary, executive producer)
- Ben Hur (2003, video, executive producer)
- The Search for Michael Rockefeller (2010, documentary)

=== Screenplay credits ===
- The Mountain Men (1980)
- Mother Lode (1982)
- Treasure Island (1990, TV movie)
- The Crucifer of Blood (1991, TV movie)
- The Search for Michael Rockefeller (2010, documentary)

== Personal life ==
Fraser and his wife Marilyn Heston have been married since 1980. The couple have a son.
