= Charlton Heston =

American actor (1923–2008)

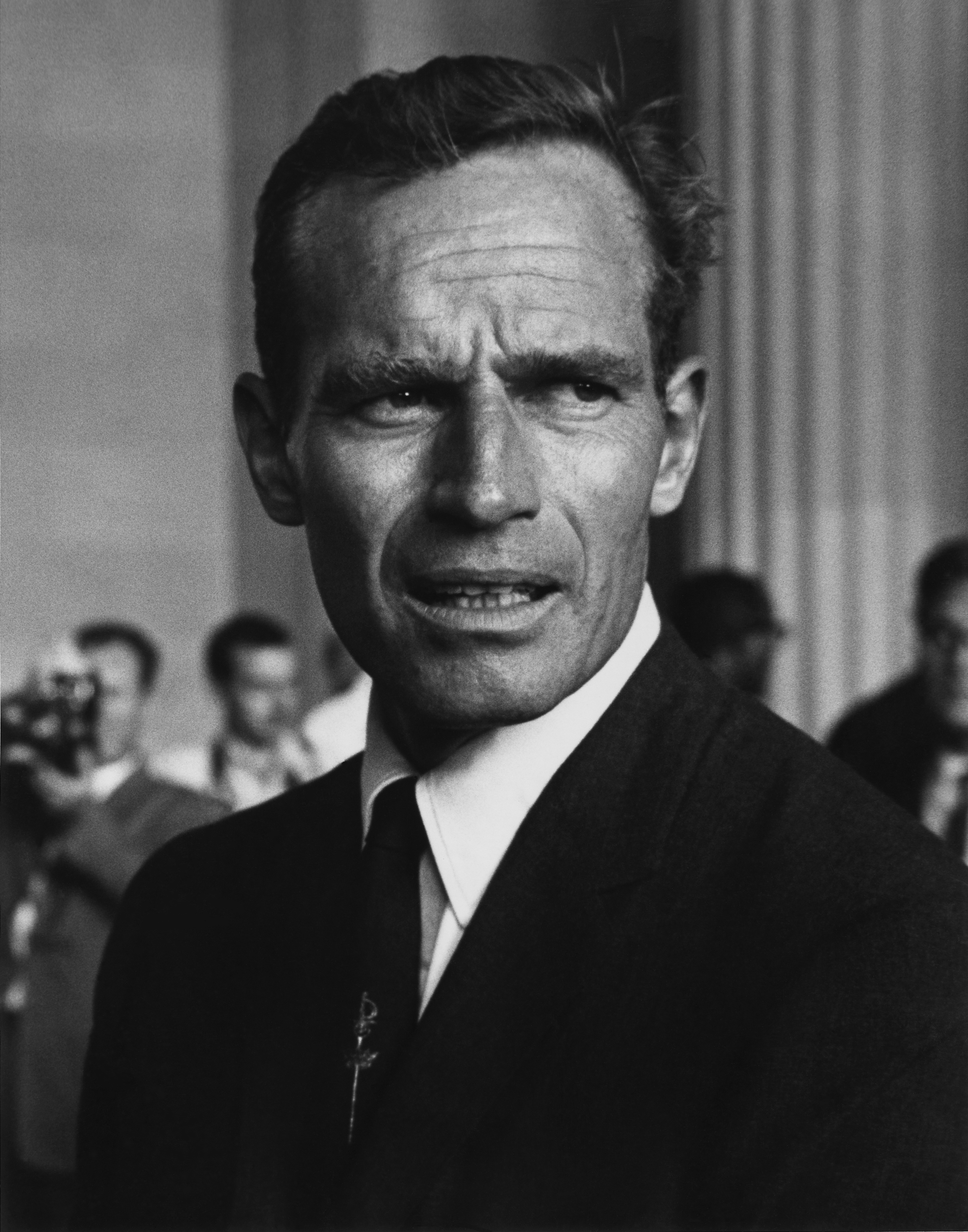
- Heston at the March on Washington in 1963
- Born: John Charles Carter; October 4, 1923; Wilmette, Illinois, U.S.
- Died: April 5, 2008 (aged 84); Beverly Hills, California, U.S.
- Resting place: Saint Matthew's Episcopal Church Columbarium
- Occupations: Actor; activist
- Years active: 1941–2003
- Works: Filmography
- Political party: Republican (after 1987); Democratic (before 1987)
- Spouse: Lydia Clarke (m. 1944)
- Children: 2, including Fraser
- Awards: Academy Award for Best Actor; Hollywood Walk of Fame; Presidential Medal of Freedom

56th President of the National Rifle Association
- In office 1998–2003
- Preceded by: Marion P. Hammer
- Succeeded by: Kayne Robinson

President of the Screen Actors Guild
- In office 1965–1971
- Preceded by: Dana Andrews
- Succeeded by: John Gavin
- Military career
- Branch: United States Army Air Forces
- Service years: 1944–1946
- Rank: Staff sergeant
- Unit: 77th Bombardment Squadron
- Conflicts: World War II

Charlton Heston (born John Charles Carter; October 4, 1923 – April 5, 2008) was an American actor and political activist. He gained stardom for his leading man roles in numerous Hollywood films including biblical epics, historical drama films, science-fiction films, and action films. He won an Academy Award, a David di Donatello Award, a Laurel Award, a Photoplay Award, a Golden Globe Award (plus three additional nominations), as well as nominations for three Primetime Emmy Awards. He received numerous honorary accolades including a Hollywood Walk of Fame Star in 1960, the Golden Globe Cecil B. DeMille Award in 1967, the Screen Actors Guild Life Achievement Award in 1971, an honorary Saturn Award in 1975, the Jean Hersholt Humanitarian Academy Award in 1978, the ShoWest Convention Lifetime Achievement Award in 1984, the Kennedy Center Honors in 1997, and the Presidential Medal of Freedom in 2003.

Heston gained stardom for his leading roles as Moses in The Ten Commandments (1956) and as the title role of Ben-Hur (1959), the latter of which earned him the Academy Award for Best Actor. His other notable credits include The Greatest Show on Earth (1952), Secret of the Incas (1954), Touch of Evil, The Big Country (both 1958), El Cid (1961), 55 Days at Peking (1963), The Greatest Story Ever Told (1965), Khartoum (1966), Planet of the Apes (1968), Julius Caesar (1970), The Omega Man (1971), Antony and Cleopatra (1972), Soylent Green, The Three Musketeers (both 1973), Airport 1975, Earthquake (both 1974), and Crossed Swords (1978). He later acted in Mother Lode (1982), Tombstone (1993), True Lies (1994), Alaska, Hamlet (both 1996), and Cats & Dogs (2001).

In the 1950s and early 1960s, he was one of a handful of Hollywood actors who openly denounced racism and he was also an active supporter of the civil rights movement. In 1987, Heston left the Democratic Party and became a Republican, founding a conservative political action committee and supporting Ronald Reagan. Heston was a five-term president of the National Rifle Association (NRA), from 1998 to 2003. After announcing that he had Alzheimer's disease in 2002, he retired from acting and the NRA presidency.

== Early life ==
=== Family ===
John Charles Carter was born on October 4, 1923, in Cook County, Illinois, to Lilla (née Baines; 1899–1994) and Russell Whitford Carter (1897–1966), a sawmill operator. His autobiography states that he was born in Wilmette, Illinois, while most sources indicate that he was born in adjacent Evanston, Illinois. His birth certificate, registered when he was 11 days old, lists his name as Charlton Carter and records his birthplace as Evanston.

Heston said in a 1995 interview that he was not very good at remembering addresses or his early childhood. Heston was of Scottish descent, including from the Clan Fraser, and of English ancestry. His earliest colonial ancestors arrived in America from England in the 1600s. His maternal great-grandparents and namesakes were Englishman William Charlton from Sunderland and Scotswoman Mary Drysdale Charlton. They emigrated to Canada, where his grandmother, Marian Emily Charlton, was born in 1872. In his autobiography Heston refers to his father participating in his family's construction business. When Heston was an infant, his father's work moved the family to St. Helen, Michigan. It was a rural, heavily forested part of the state, and Heston lived an isolated yet idyllic existence, spending much time hunting and fishing in the backwoods of the area.

When Heston was ten years old, his parents divorced after having three children. Shortly thereafter, his mother remarried and Charlton, with his younger sister Lilla and younger brother Alan, next moved to Wilmette. Heston and his two siblings took the surname of his mother's new husband. The three children attended New Trier High School, which would become the high school attended by Rock Hudson and Ann-Margret. He recalled living there, "All kids play pretend games, but I did it more than most. Even when we moved to Chicago, I was more or less a loner. We lived in a North Shore suburb, where I was a skinny hick from the woods, and all the other kids seemed to be rich and know about girls". Contradictions on paper and in an interview surround when "Charlton" became Heston's first name. His birth certificate lists his name as Charlton Carter, and the 1930 United States census record for Richfield, Michigan, in Roscommon County, shows his name as being Charlton J. Carter at age six. Later accounts and movie studio biographies say he was born John Charles Carter. When Russell Carter died in 1966, Charlton's brother and sister changed their surname from Carter to Heston the following year; Charlton did not.

Charlton was his maternal grandmother Marian's maiden name, not his mother Lilla's. This is contrary to how 20th-century references read and what Heston said. When Heston's maternal grandmother and his biological maternal grandfather Charles Baines separated or divorced in the early 1900s, Marian (née Charlton) Baines married William Henry Lawton in 1907. Charlton Heston's mother, Lilla, and her sister May were adopted by their maternal grandfather and changed their last name to Charlton in order to distance themselves from their biological father, Mr. Baines, who was an undesirable father figure. The Carters divorced in 1933 and Lilla Carter married Chester Heston. The newly married Mrs. Heston preferred her children use the same last name as hers. It was thus as Charlton Heston that he appeared in his first film with younger brother Alan Carter (small role), an adaptation of Henrik Ibsen's Peer Gynt (1941). His nickname was always Chuck.

=== Education ===
Heston frequently recounted that while growing up in northern Illinois in a sparsely populated area, he often wandered in the forest, "acting" out characters from books he had read. Later, in high school, he enrolled in New Trier's drama program, playing the lead role in an amateur silent 16 mm film adaptation of Peer Gynt (from the Ibsen play) by future filmmaker David Bradley, released in 1941. From the Winnetka Community Theatre (or the Winnetka Dramatist's Guild, as it was then known) in which he was active, he earned a drama scholarship to Northwestern University. He attended college from 1941 to 1943 and among his acting teachers was Alvina Krause, but dropped out without earning a degree. Several years later, Heston teamed up with Bradley to produce the first sound version of William Shakespeare's Julius Caesar, in which Heston played Mark Antony.

=== World War II service ===
In March 1944 Heston married Northwestern University student Lydia Marie Clarke at Grace Methodist Church in downtown Greensboro, North Carolina. That same year, he joined the military. Heston enlisted in the United States Army Air Forces and served for two years as a radio operator and aerial gunner aboard a North American B-25 Mitchell medium bomber stationed in the Alaskan Aleutian Islands with the 77th Bombardment Squadron of the Eleventh Air Force. He reached the rank of staff sergeant.

After his rise to fame, Heston narrated for highly classified U.S. Armed Forces and Department of Energy instructional films, particularly relating to nuclear weapons, and "for six years Heston [held] the nation's highest security clearance" or Q clearance. The Q clearance is similar to a DoD or DIA clearance of top secret.

== Career ==
=== 1947–1955: Early theatre and film roles ===
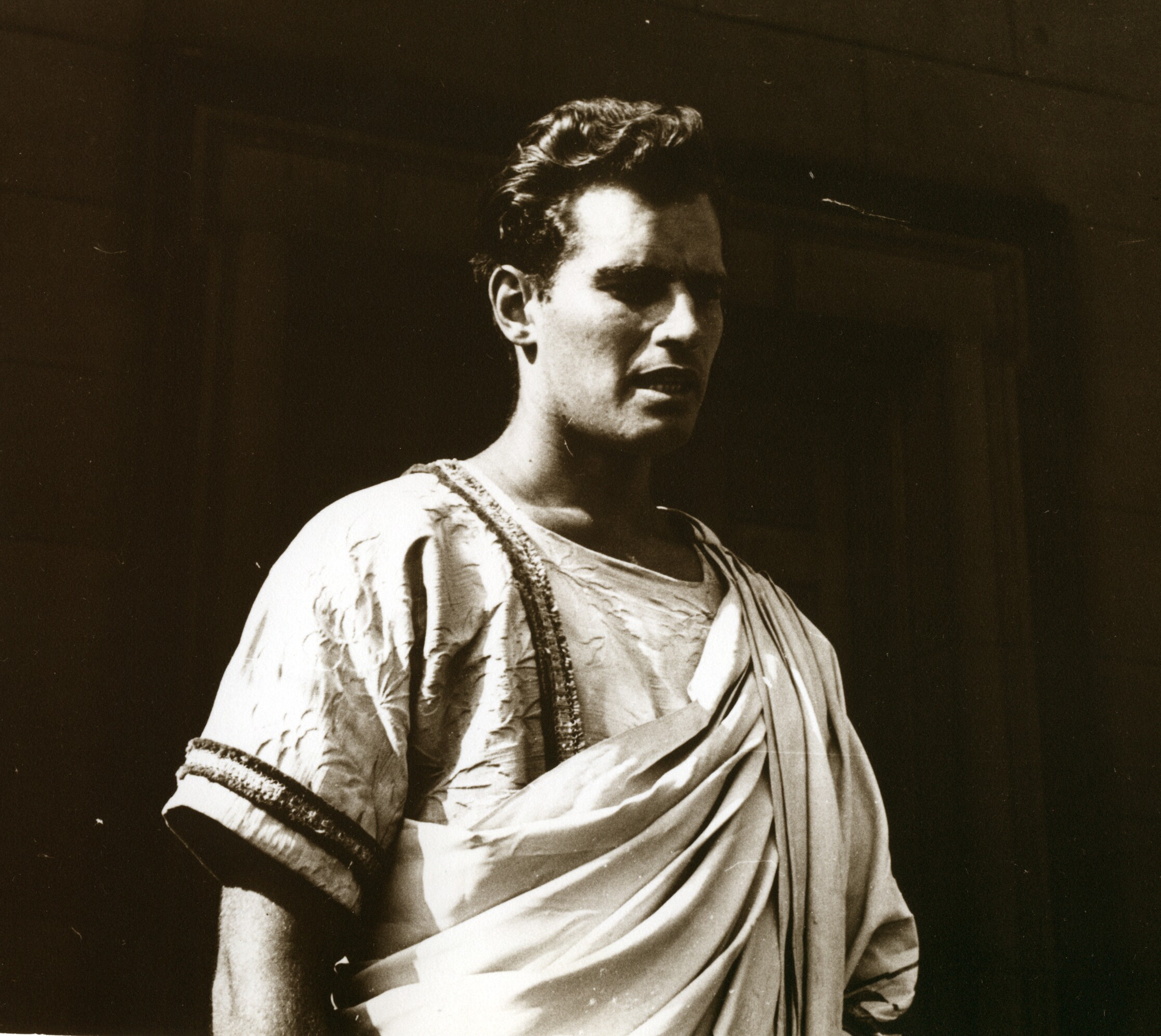
Heston as Mark Antony in Julius Caesar (1950)

After the war, the Hestons lived in Hell's Kitchen, New York City, where they worked as artists' models. Seeking a way to make it in theatre, they decided to manage a playhouse in Asheville, North Carolina, in 1947, making $100 a week (roughly equivalent to $1,400 in 2025). In 1948, they returned to New York, where Heston was offered a supporting role in a Broadway revival of Shakespeare's Antony and Cleopatra, starring Katharine Cornell. In television, Heston played a number of roles in CBS's Studio One, one of the most popular anthology dramas of the 1950s. In 1949 Heston played Mark Antony in an independent film adaptation of Julius Caesar (1950). Film producer Hal B. Wallis spotted Heston in a 1950 television production of Wuthering Heights and offered him a contract. When his wife reminded Heston they had decided to pursue theater and television, he replied, "Well, maybe just for one film to see what it's like."

Heston with Katy Jurado in Arrowhead (1953)

Heston's first professional movie appearance was the leading role at age 26 in Dark City, a 1950 film noir produced by Hal Wallis. His breakthrough came when Cecil B. DeMille cast him as a circus manager in The Greatest Show on Earth, which was named by the Motion Picture Academy as the Best Picture of 1952. It was also the most popular movie of that year. King Vidor used Heston in a melodrama with Jennifer Jones, Ruby Gentry (1952). He followed it with a Western at Paramount, The Savage (1952), playing a white man raised by Indians. 20th Century Fox used him to play Andrew Jackson in The President's Lady (1953) opposite Susan Hayward. Back at Paramount Heston was Buffalo Bill in Pony Express (1953). He followed this with another Western, Arrowhead (1953).

In 1953, Heston was Billy Wilder's first choice to play Sefton in Stalag 17. However, the role was given to William Holden, who won an Oscar for it. Hal Wallis reunited Heston with Lizabeth Scott in a melodrama Bad for Each Other (1953). In 1954, he made two adventure films for Paramount Pictures. The Naked Jungle had Heston battle a plague of killer ants. He played the lead in Secret of the Incas, which was shot on location at the archeological site Machu Picchu and has numerous similarities to Raiders of the Lost Ark, which appeared a quarter of a century later. Heston played the explorer William Clark in The Far Horizons (1955) with Fred MacMurray as Meriwether Lewis. Heston tried a comedy The Private War of Major Benson (1955) at Universal, then supported Jane Wyman in a drama Lucy Gallant (1955).

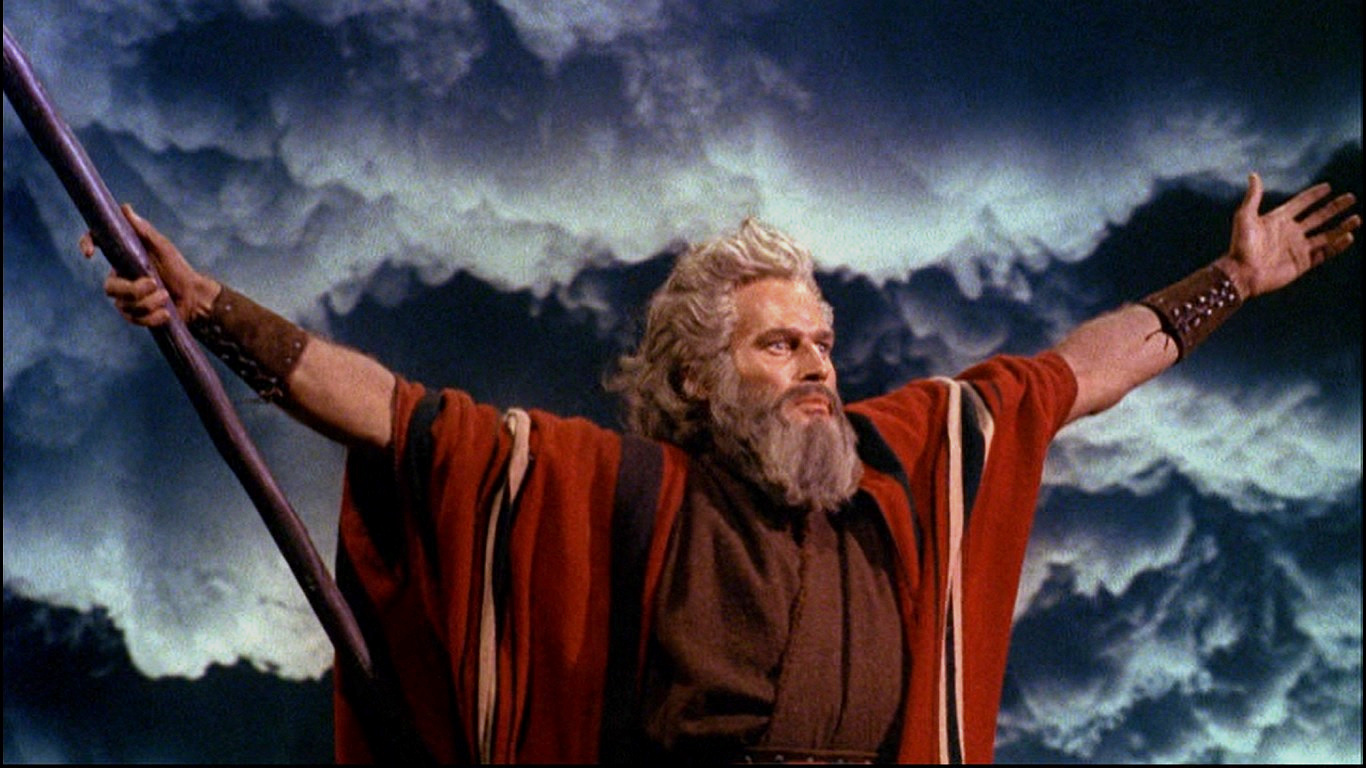
Heston as Moses in Cecil B. DeMille's The Ten Commandments (1956)

Heston played Moses in the hugely successful biblical epic The Ten Commandments (1956), selected by director Cecil B. DeMille, who thought Heston bore an uncanny resemblance to Michelangelo's statue of Moses. DeMille cast Heston's three-month-old son Fraser Clarke Heston as the infant Moses. The Ten Commandments became one of the greatest box office successes of all time and is the eighth-highest-grossing film adjusted for inflation. His portrayal of the Hebrew prophet and deliverer was praised by film critics. The Hollywood Reporter described him as "splendid, handsome and princely (and human) in the scenes dealing with him as a young man, and majestic and terrible as his role demands it". The New York Daily News wrote that Heston "is remarkably effective as both the young, princely Moses and as the Patriarchal savior of his people". His performance as Moses earned him his first nomination for the Golden Globe Award for Best Actor – Motion Picture Drama and Spain's Fotogramas de Plata Award for Best Foreign Performer. When the Egyptian Theater reopened in December 1998, it screened Cecil B. DeMille's 1923 original The Ten Commandments, which had premiered there 75 years earlier. Charlton and Lydia Heston were honored guests at this opening showing and were seated with their longtime friends, brothers Charles Elias Disney and Daniel H. Disney.

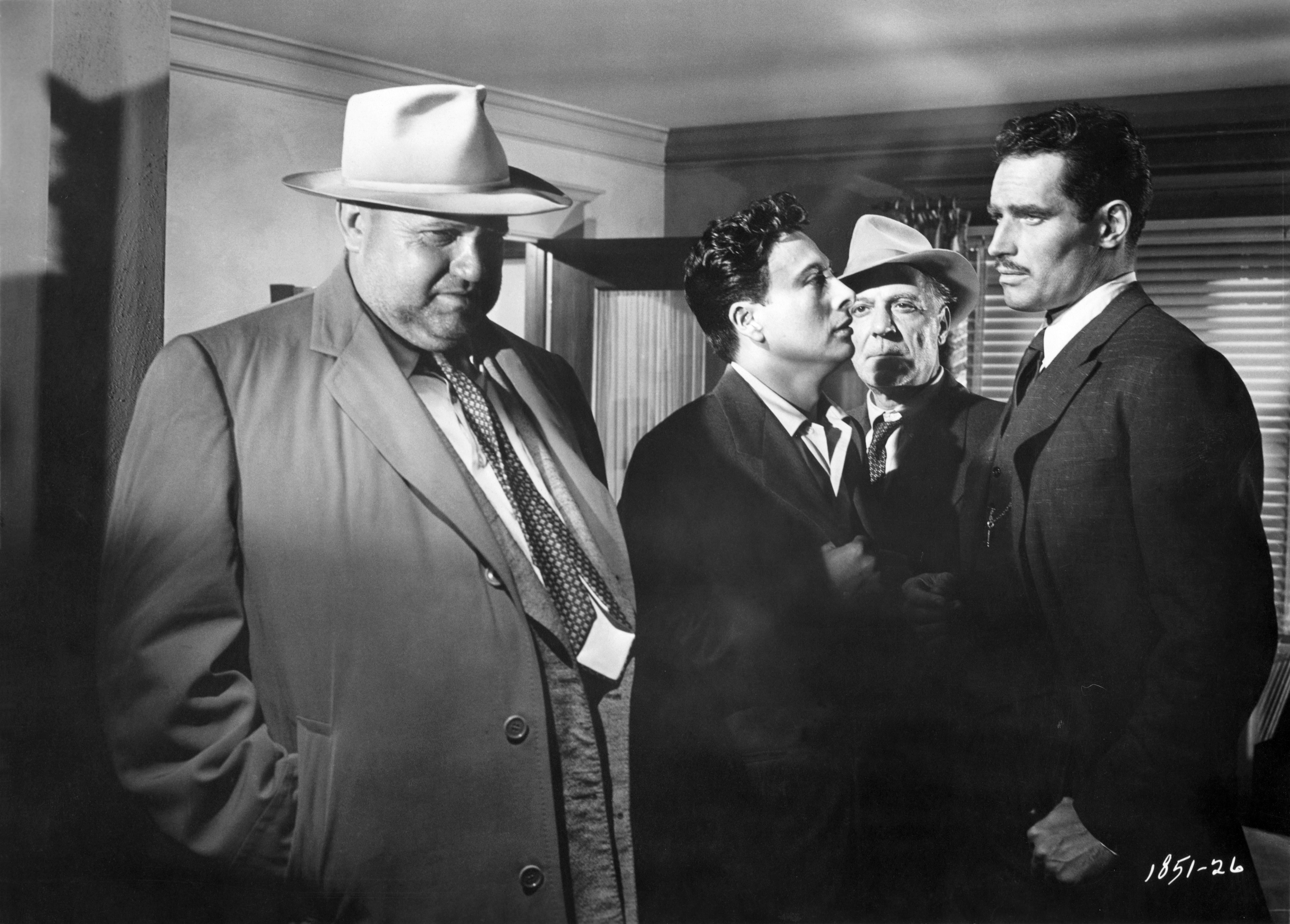
Orson Welles, Victor Millan, Joseph Calleia, and Heston in Touch of Evil (1958)

Heston went back to Westerns with Three Violent People (1957). Universal tried to interest him in a thriller starring Orson Welles, Touch of Evil; Heston agreed to be in it if Welles directed. The film has come to be regarded as a masterpiece, despite criticism for Heston playing the role of Mexican prosecutor Mike Vargas in brownface. He also played a rare supporting role in William Wyler's The Big Country opposite Gregory Peck and Burl Ives. Heston had another chance to play Andrew Jackson in The Buccaneer (1958), produced by De Mille and starring Yul Brynner.

=== 1956–1967: Film stardom ===
After Marlon Brando, Burt Lancaster, and Rock Hudson turned down the title role in Ben-Hur (1959), Heston accepted the role, winning the Academy Award for Best Actor, one of the unprecedented 11 Oscars the film earned. After Moses and Ben-Hur, Heston became more identified with Biblical epics than any other actor. He later voiced Ben-Hur in an animated television production of the Lew Wallace novel in 2003. Heston followed it with The Wreck of the Mary Deare (1959) co-starring Gary Cooper, which was a box office disappointment.

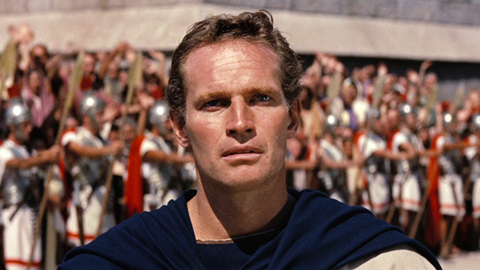
Heston in Ben-Hur (1959)

Heston turned down the lead opposite Marilyn Monroe in Let's Make Love to appear in Benn W. Levy's play The Tumbler, directed by Laurence Olivier. Called a "harrowingly pretentious verse drama" by Time, the production went through a troubled out-of-town tryout period in Boston and closed after five performances on Broadway in February 1960. Heston, a great admirer of Olivier the actor, took on the play to work with him as a director. After the play flopped, Heston told columnist Joe Hyams, "I feel I am the only one who came out with a profit. ... I got out of it precisely what I went in for—a chance to work with Olivier. I learned from him in six weeks things I never would have learned otherwise. I think I've ended up a better actor."

Heston enjoyed acting on stage, believing it revivified him as an actor. He never returned to Broadway but acted in regional theatres. His most frequent stage roles included the title role in Macbeth, and Mark Antony in both Julius Caesar and Antony and Cleopatra. Heston considered himself to be a Shakespearean actor and collected significant works by and about William Shakespeare. He played Sir Thomas More in A Man for All Seasons in several regional productions in the 1960s, 1970s and 1980s, eventually playing it in London's West End. The play was a success and the West End production was taken to Aberdeen, Scotland, for a week, where it was staged at His Majesty's Theatre. Samuel Bronston pursued Heston to play the title role in an epic shot in Spain, El Cid (1961), which was a big success. He was in a war film for Paramount, The Pigeon That Took Rome (1962), and a melodrama shot in Hawaii, Diamond Head (1963). Bronston wanted him for another epic and the result was 55 Days at Peking (1963), which was a box office disappointment.

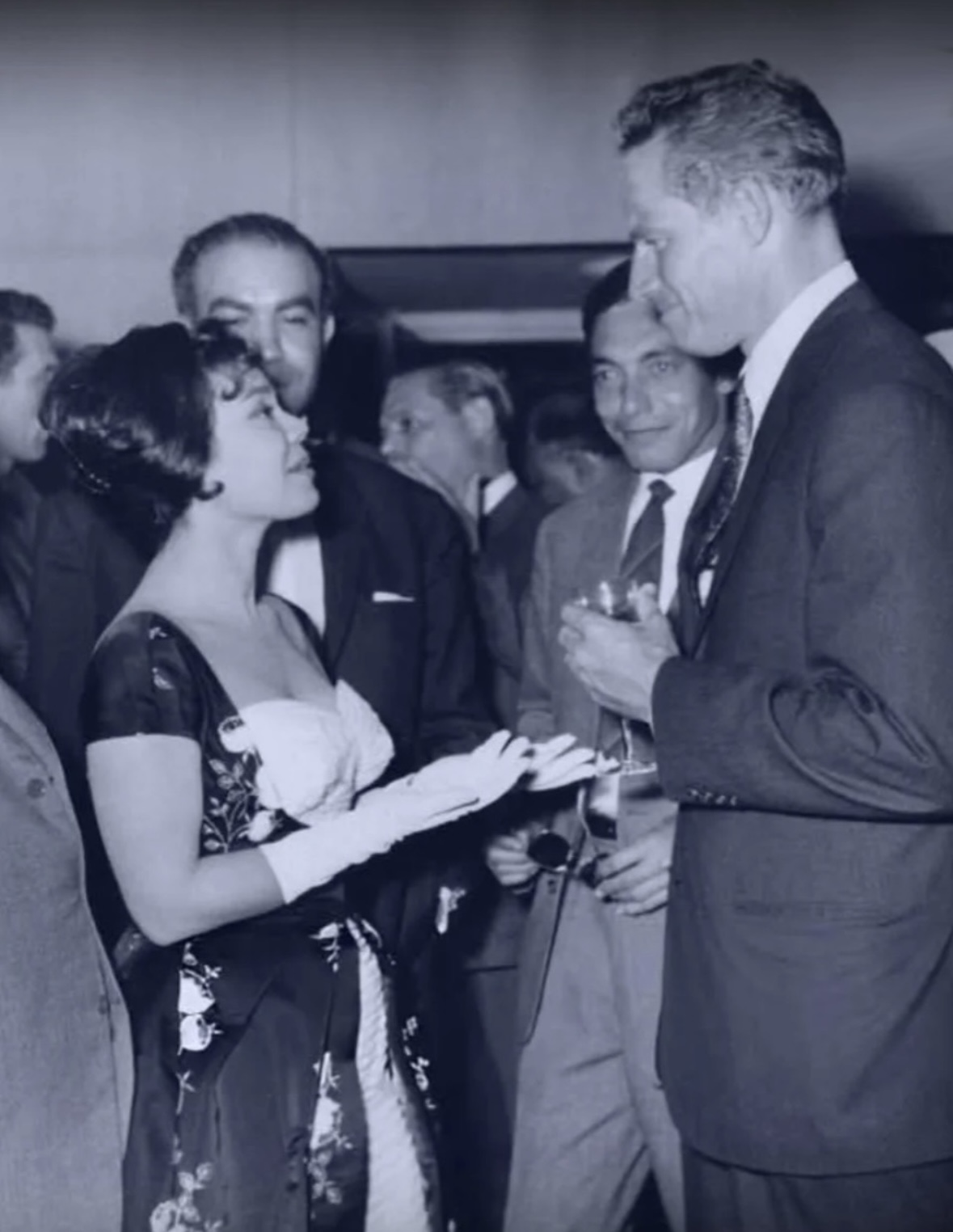
Heston speaking to Magda during the 11th Berlin International Film Festival, 1961

Heston focused on epics: he was John the Baptist in The Greatest Story Ever Told (1965); Michelangelo in The Agony and the Ecstasy (1965) opposite Rex Harrison; the title role in Major Dundee (1965), directed by Sam Peckinpah. The War Lord (1965), directed by Franklin J. Schaffner, was on a smaller scale and critically acclaimed, though commercially it fared poorly. In Khartoum (1966) Heston played General Charles Gordon. From 1965 until 1971, Heston served as president of the Screen Actors Guild. The Guild had been created in 1933 for the benefit of actors, who had different interests from the producers and directors who controlled the Academy of Motion Picture Arts and Sciences. He was more conservative than most actors and publicly clashed with outspoken liberal actors such as Ed Asner. Counterpoint (1968) was a war film that was not particularly successful at the box office. Neither was the Western Will Penny (1968), directed by Tom Gries; however, Heston received excellent reviews and it was one of his favorite films.

=== 1968–1976: Established star ===
Heston had not been in a big hit for a number of years but in 1968 he starred in Planet of the Apes, directed by Schaffner, which was hugely popular. Less so was a football drama, Number One (1969) directed by Gries. Heston had a smaller supporting role in Beneath the Planet of the Apes (1970), which was popular. However, The Hawaiians (1970), directed by Gries, was not. In 1970, he portrayed Mark Antony again in another film version of Shakespeare's Julius Caesar. His co-stars included Jason Robards as Brutus, Richard Chamberlain as Octavius, Robert Vaughn as Casca, and English actors Richard Johnson as Cassius, John Gielgud as Caesar, and Diana Rigg as Portia.

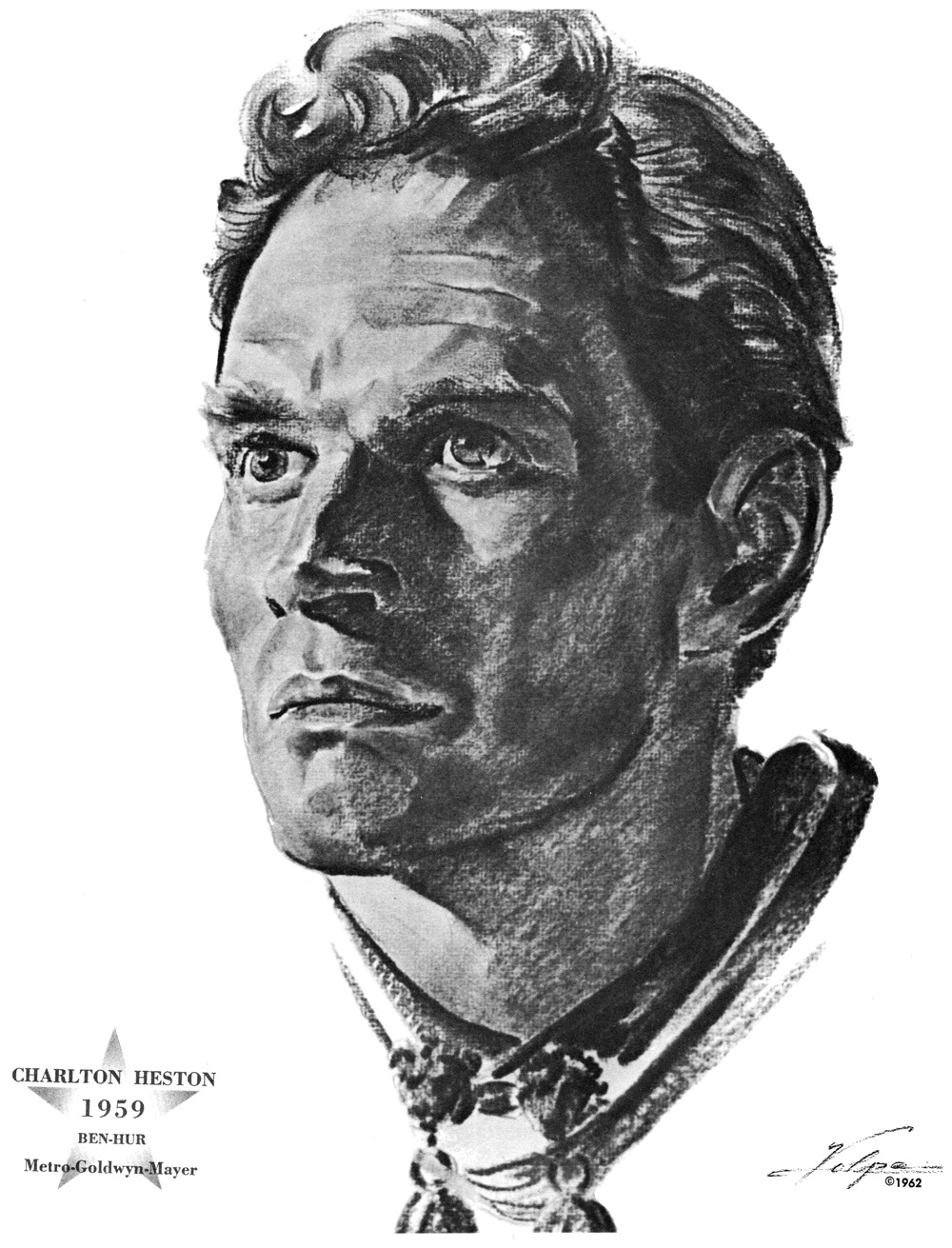
Drawing of Heston after he won an Oscar for Ben-Hur in 1959 (artist: Nicholas Volpe)

In 1971, he starred in the post-apocalyptic science-fiction film The Omega Man, which has received mixed critical reviews, but was popular, and has become a cult film in the years since release. It was also during this time he became a gun rights advocate. In 1972, Heston made his directorial debut and starred as Mark Antony in an adaptation of the William Shakespeare play he had performed earlier in his theater career, Antony and Cleopatra. Hildegarde Neil was Cleopatra and English actor Eric Porter was Ahenobarbus. After receiving scathing reviews, the film was never released to theaters and is rarely seen on television.

His next film, Skyjacked (1972) was a hit. However The Call of the Wild (1972) was a flop, one of Heston's least favorite films. He quickly recovered with a string of box office hits: Soylent Green (1973), another dystopian science fiction film that has since achieved cult status; The Three Musketeers (1973), playing Cardinal Richelieu as part of an all-star cast ensemble; two back-to-back disaster films, the hugely successful Earthquake (1974), and Airport 1975 (1974), also a success; and Midway (1976) a war film, also a box office hit.

=== 1977–2000: Later film roles ===
Heston's long run as a box office draw effectively ended with Two-Minute Warning (1976), a suspense film, and The Last Hard Men (1976), a Western. He played King Henry VIII for The Prince and the Pauper (1977) from the Musketeers team, then starred in a disaster-suspense film Gray Lady Down (1978). Heston was in a Western written by his son, The Mountain Men (1980), and a horror film, The Awakening (1980). He made his second film as a director, Mother Lode (1982), also written by his son, and it was a commercial disappointment.

From 1985 until 1987, he starred in his only prime time stint on a television series in the soap The Colbys. With his son Fraser, he produced and starred in several TV movies, including remakes of Treasure Island and A Man for All Seasons. In 1992, Heston appeared on the A&E cable network in a short series of videos, Charlton Heston Presents the Bible, reading passages from the King James version.

In 1993, Heston teamed with John Anthony West and Robert M. Schoch in an Emmy Award-winning NBC special, The Mystery of the Sphinx. West and Schoch had proposed a much earlier date for the construction of the Great Sphinx than the one which is generally accepted. They had suggested that the main type of weathering evident on the Great Sphinx and surrounding enclosure walls could only have been caused by prolonged and extensive rainfall and that the whole structure was carved out of limestone bedrock by an ancient advanced culture (such as the Heavy Neolithic Qaraoun culture). Never taking himself too seriously, Heston also made several appearances as "Chuck" in Dame Edna Everage's shows, both on stage and on television. Heston appeared in 1993 in a cameo role in Wayne's World 2 in a scene where Wayne Campbell (Mike Myers) requests casting a better actor for a small role. After the scene is reshot with Heston, Campbell weeps in awe. That same year, Heston hosted Saturday Night Live. He had cameos in the films Hamlet, Tombstone, and True Lies.

Heston starred in many theatrical productions at the Los Angeles Music Center, where he appeared in Detective Story, The Caine Mutiny Court-Martial, and as Sherlock Holmes in The Crucifer of Blood opposite Richard Johnson as Dr. Watson. In 2001, he made a cameo appearance as an elderly dying simian in Tim Burton's remake of Planet of the Apes. His last film role was as Josef Mengele in Rua Alguem 5555: My Father, which had limited release (mainly to festivals) in 2003. Heston's distinctive voice landed him roles as a film narrator, including the opening scenes of Armageddon and Disney's Hercules. He played the title role in Mister Roberts three times and cited it as one of his favorite roles. In the early 1990s, he tried unsuccessfully to revive and direct the show with Tom Selleck in the title role. In 1998, Heston had a cameo role playing himself in the American television series Friends in the episode "The One with Joey's Dirty Day". In 2000, he played Chief Justice Haden Wainwright in The Outer Limits episode "Final Appeal".

== Acting credits and accolades ==
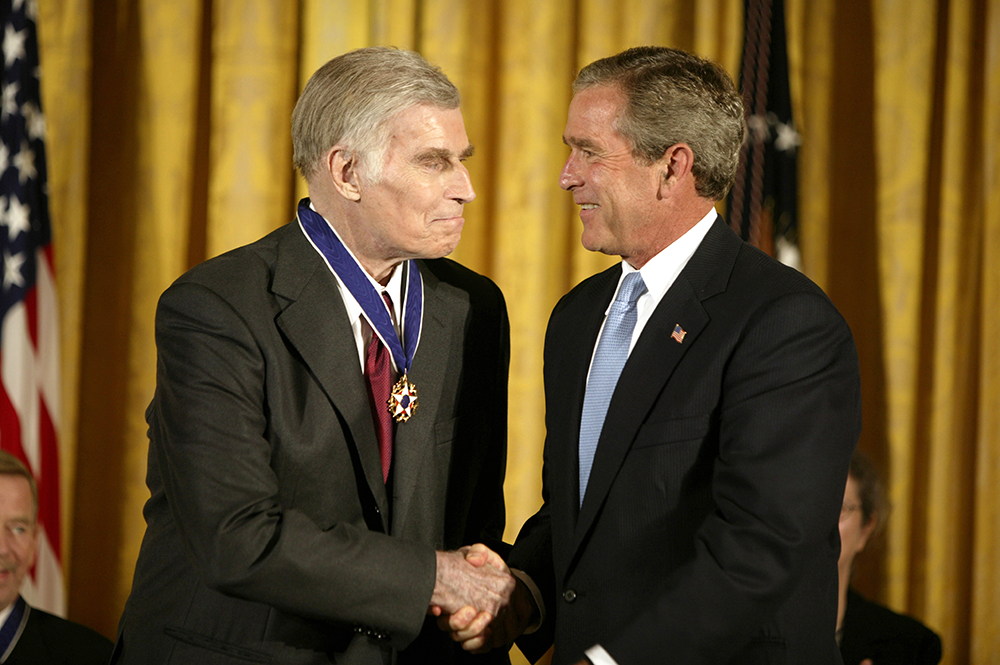
Heston is presented the Presidential Medal of Freedom by President George W. Bush in 2003, which ended up being his final public appearance

Richard Corliss wrote in Time magazine, "From start to finish, Heston was a grand, ornery anachronism, the sinewy symbol of a time when Hollywood took itself seriously, when heroes came from history books, not comic books. Epics like Ben-Hur or El Cid simply couldn't be made today, in part because popular culture has changed as much as political fashion. But mainly because there's no one remotely like Charlton Heston to infuse the form with his stature, fire, and guts." In his obituary for the actor, film critic Roger Ebert noted, "Heston made at least three movies that almost everybody eventually sees: Ben-Hur, The Ten Commandments and Planet of the Apes." Heston's cinematic legacy was the subject of Cinematic Atlas: The Triumphs of Charlton Heston, an 11-film retrospective by the Film Society of the Lincoln Center that was shown at the Walter Reade Theatre from August 29 to September 4, 2008.

On April 17, 2010, Heston was inducted into the National Cowboy and Western Heritage Museum's Hall of Great Western Performers. In his childhood hometown of St. Helen, Michigan, a charter (independent) school, Charlton Heston Academy, opened on September 4, 2012. It is housed in the former St. Helen Elementary School. Enrollment on the first day was 220 students in grades kindergarten through eighth.

Charlton Heston was commemorated on a United States postage stamp issued on April 11, 2014. Charlton Heston was inducted as a Laureate of the Lincoln Academy of Illinois and awarded the Order of Lincoln (the State's highest honor) by Illinois Governor James R. Thompson in 1977 in the area of Performing Arts.

== Political views ==
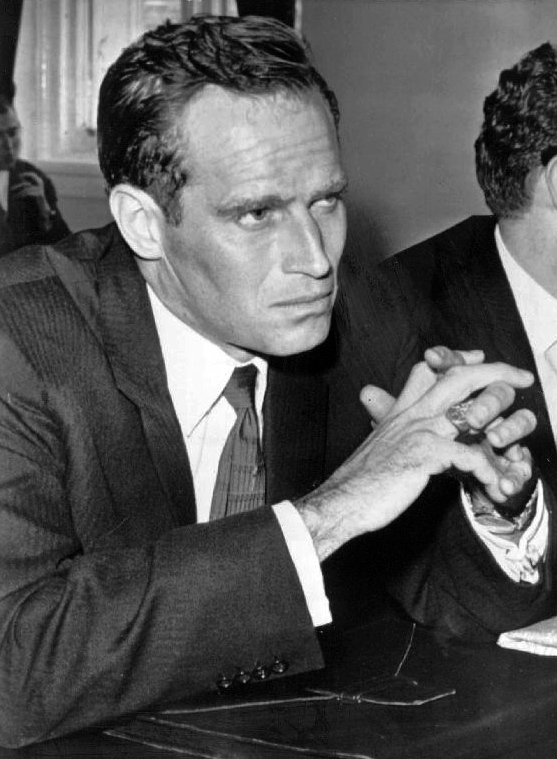
Heston at a congressional hearing in 1961

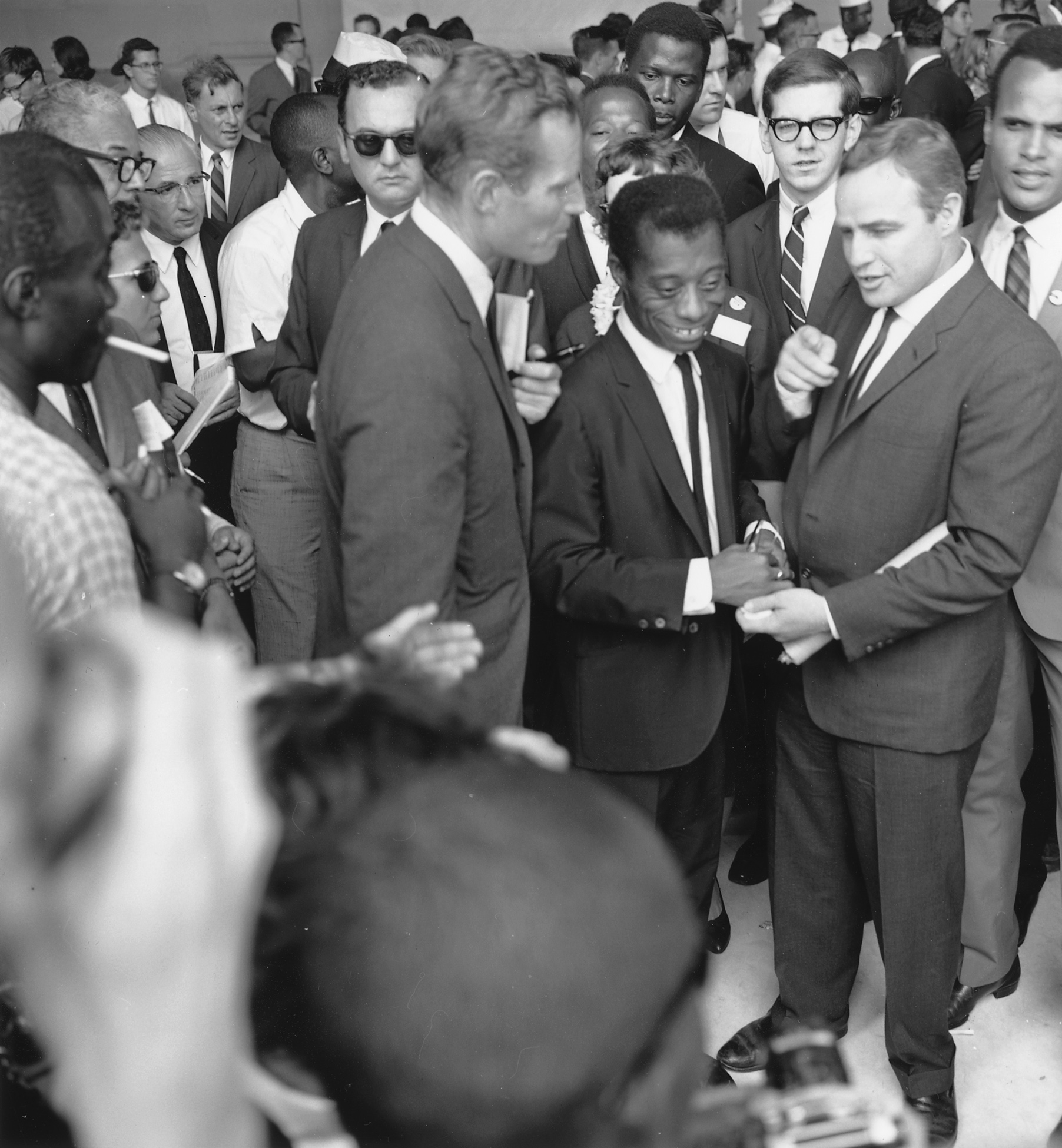
Charlton Heston (left) with James Baldwin, Marlon Brando, and Harry Belafonte at the Civil Rights March on Washington for Jobs and Freedom 1963: Sidney Poitier is in the background.

Heston's political activism had four stages:

In the first stage, 1955–1961, he endorsed liberal Democratic candidates for president and signed on to petitions for liberal political causes.

From 1961 until 1972, the second stage, he continued to endorse Democratic candidates for president. Moving beyond Hollywood, he became nationally visible in 1963 in support of the Civil Rights Act of 1964. From 1965 until 1971, he served as the elected President of the Screen Actors Guild and clashed with his liberal rival Ed Asner. In 1968, he helped publicize gun control measures when he joined fellow Hollywood stars in support of the Gun Control Act of 1968.

The third stage began in 1972. Heston rejected the liberalism of George McGovern and supported Republican Richard Nixon in 1972 for president. In the 1980s, he gave strong support to Ronald Reagan during his conservative presidency.

In 1995, Heston entered his fourth stage by establishing his own political action fund-raising committee and jumped into the internal politics of the National Rifle Association. He gave numerous culture wars speeches and interviews upholding the conservative position, blaming media and academia for imposing affirmative action, which he saw as unfair reverse discrimination.

=== Civil rights advocate ===
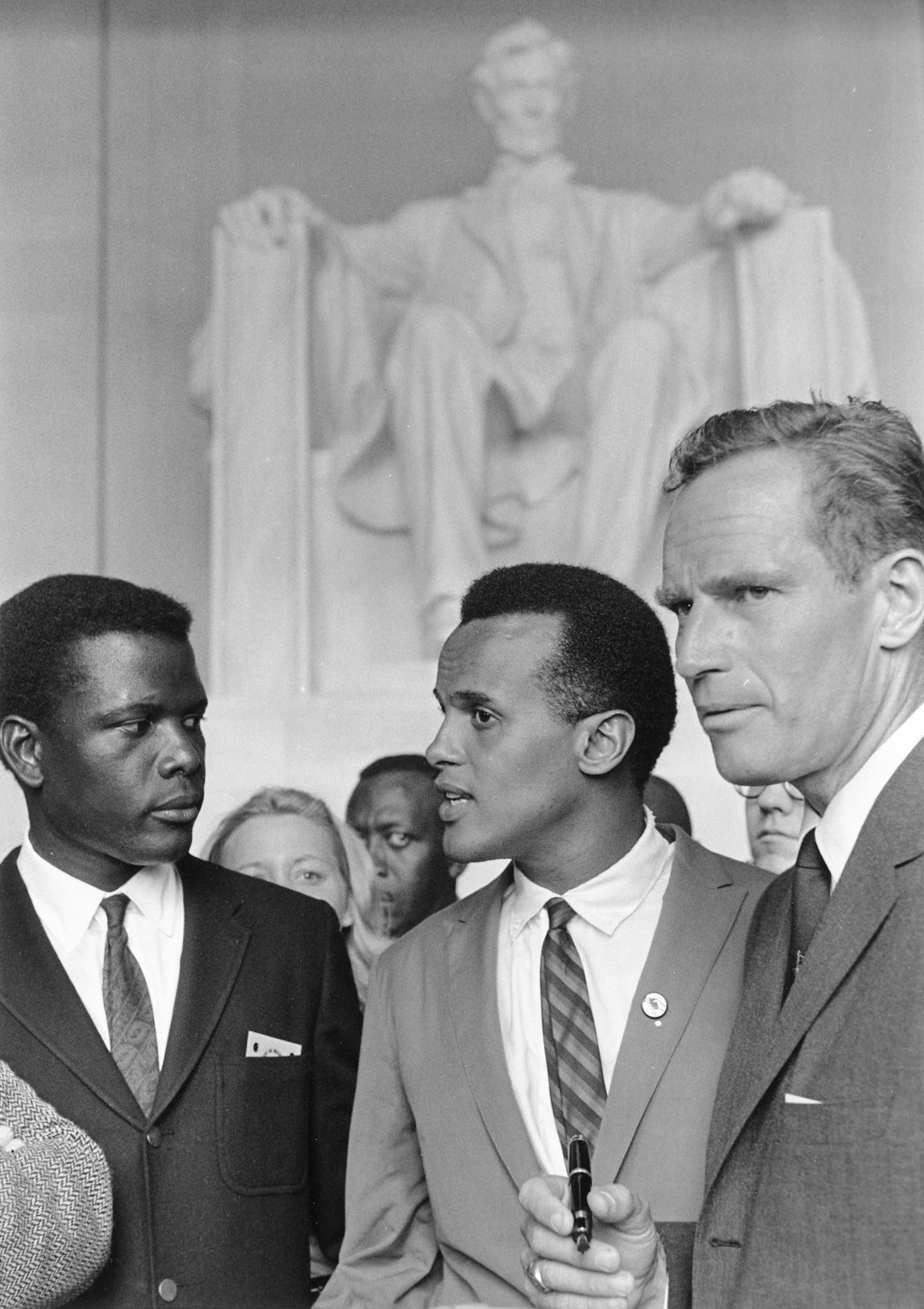
Heston at the 1963 Civil Rights March on Washington, D.C. with Sidney Poitier (left) and Harry Belafonte

Heston campaigned for presidential candidate Adlai Stevenson in 1956, although he was unable to campaign for John F. Kennedy in 1960 because he was filming El Cid in Spain. Reportedly, when a segregated Oklahoma movie theater was showing his movie El Cid for the first time in 1961, he joined a picket line outside the movie theater. Heston made no reference to this incident in his autobiography but he described traveling to Oklahoma City to picket segregated restaurants, to the chagrin of the producers of El Cid, Allied Artists. During the March on Washington for Jobs and Freedom held in Washington, D.C., in 1963, he accompanied Martin Luther King Jr. In later speeches, he said he helped the civil rights cause "long before Hollywood found it fashionable".

In the 1964 election, he endorsed Lyndon B. Johnson, who had masterminded the passage of the Civil Rights Act of 1964 through Congress over the vociferous opposition of southern Democrats. That year, Heston publicly opposed California Proposition 14 that rolled back the state's fair housing law, the Rumford Fair Housing Act.

=== Vietnam war ===
Heston opposed the Vietnam War during its course (though he changed his opinion in the years following the war) and in 1969 was approached by the Democratic Party to run for the U.S. Senate against incumbent George Murphy. He agonized over the decision but ultimately determined he could never give up acting. He supported Richard Nixon in 1972, though Nixon is not mentioned in his autobiography.

=== Gun rights ===
In his 1995 autobiography In the Arena, written after he became a conservative Republican, Heston wrote that while driving back from the set of The War Lord in 1964, he saw a "Barry Goldwater for President" billboard with his campaign slogan "In Your Heart You Know He's Right" and thought to himself, "Son of a bitch, he is right." Heston later said that his support for Goldwater was the event that helped turn him against gun control laws.

Following the assassination of Senator Robert F. Kennedy in 1968, Heston, Gregory Peck, Kirk Douglas, and James Stewart issued a statement in support of President Johnson's Gun Control Act of 1968. The Johnson White House had solicited Heston's support. He endorsed Hubert Humphrey in the 1968 presidential election.

By the 1980s, Heston supported gun rights and changed his political affiliation from Democratic to Republican. When asked why he changed political alliances, Heston replied "I didn't change. The Democratic Party changed." In 1987, he first registered as a Republican. He campaigned for Republicans and Republican presidents Ronald Reagan, George H. W. Bush, and George W. Bush.

=== Culture war ===
"the God-fearing, law-abiding, Caucasian, middle-class Protestant—or even worse, evangelical Christian, Midwestern or Southern—or even worse, rural, apparently straight—or even worse, admitted heterosexuals, gun-owning—or even worse, NRA card-carrying, average working stiff—or even worse, male working stiff—because, not only don't you count, you are a down-right obstacle to social progress. Your voice deserves a lower decibel level, your opinion is less enlightened, your media access is insignificant; and frankly, mister, you need to wake up, wise up, and learn a little something from your new America; and until you do, would you mind shutting up?"

— Heston, "Fighting the Culture War in America" speech (1997)

Heston resigned in protest from Actors Equity, saying the union's refusal to allow a white actor to play a Eurasian role in Miss Saigon was "obscenely racist". Heston charged that CNN's telecasts from Baghdad were "sowing doubts" about the allied effort in the 1990–1991 Gulf War. At a Time Warner stockholders' meeting, Heston castigated the company for releasing an Ice-T album which included a song "Cop Killer" about killing police officers. While filming The Savage, Heston was initiated by blood into the Miniconjou Lakota Nation, saying that he had no natural American Indian heritage, but elected to be "Native American" to salvage the term from exclusively referring to American Indians.

In Heston's 1997 speech, called "Fighting the Culture War in America", Heston rhetorically deplored a culture war he said was being conducted by a generation of media people, educators, entertainers, and politicians. He stated, "The Constitution was handed down to guide us by a bunch of wise old dead white guys who invented our country! Now some flinch when I say that. Why! It's true ... they were white guys! So were most of the guys that died in Lincoln's name opposing slavery in the 1860s. So why should I be ashamed of white guys? Why is "Hispanic Pride" or "Black Pride" a good thing, while "White Pride" conjures shaven heads and white hoods? Why was the Million Man March on Washington celebrated by many as progress, while the Promise Keepers March on Washington was greeted with suspicion and ridicule? I'll tell you why: Cultural warfare!" In an address to students at Harvard Law School entitled "Winning the Cultural War", Heston said, "If Americans believed in political correctness, we'd still be King George's boys—subjects bound to the British crown."

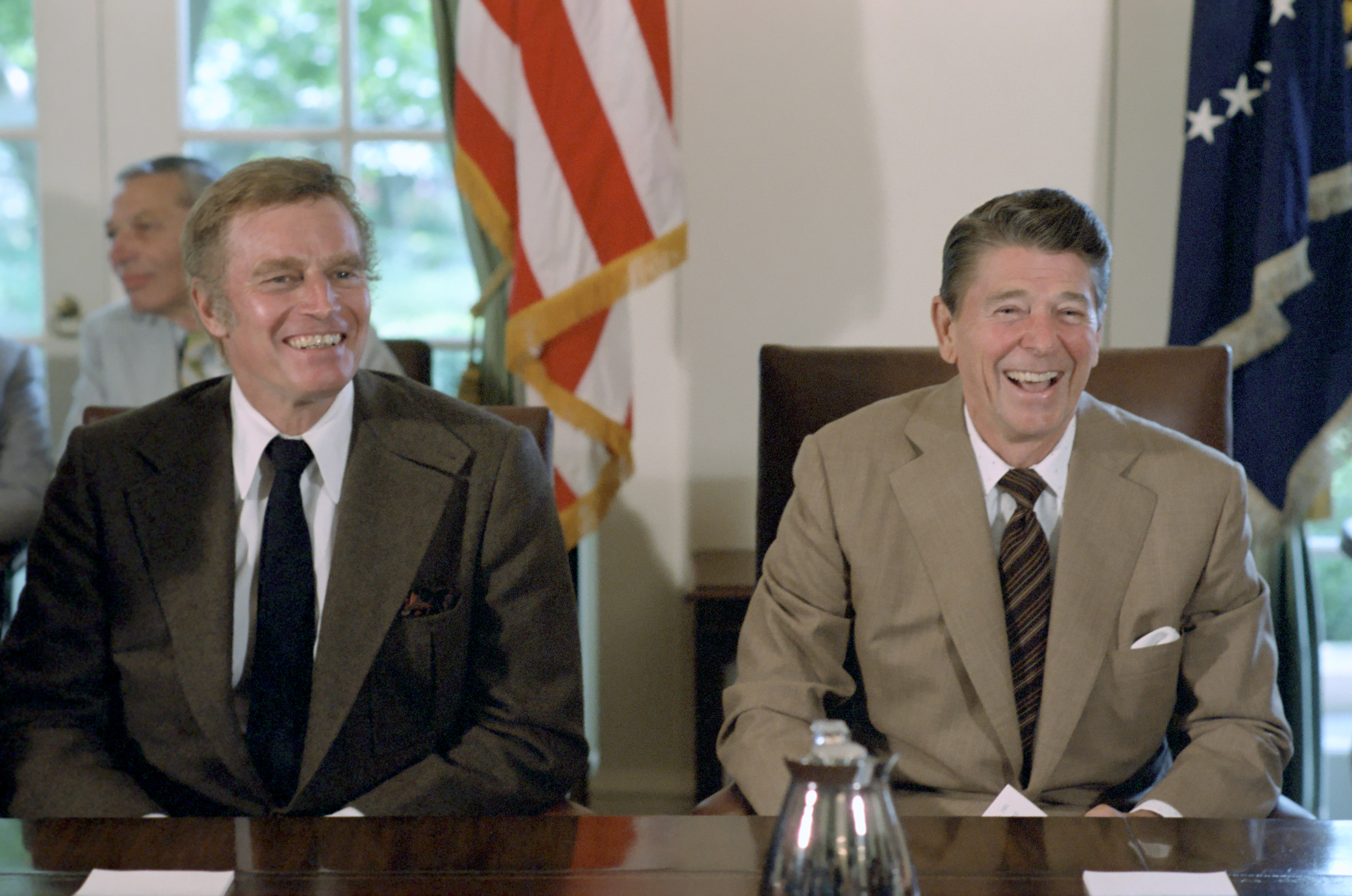
Heston with President Ronald Reagan during a meeting for the Presidential Task Force on the Arts and Humanities in the White House Cabinet Room in 1981

He said to the students: "You are the best and the brightest. You, here in this fertile cradle of American academia, here in the castle of learning on the Charles River. You are the cream. But I submit that you and your counterparts across the land are the most socially conformed and politically silenced generation since Concord Bridge. And as long as you validate that and abide it, you are, by your grandfathers' standards, cowards". During a speech at Brandeis University, he stated, "Political correctness is tyranny with manners". In a speech to the National Press Club in 1997, Heston said, "Now, I doubt any of you would prefer a rolled up newspaper as a weapon against a dictator or a criminal intruder."

=== NRA president ===
Heston was the president of the NRA from 1998 until his resignation in 2003. At the 2000 NRA convention, he raised a rifle over his head and declared that he would not allow a potential Al Gore administration to take away his Second Amendment rights except "from my cold, dead hands". In announcing his resignation from the presidency in 2003, he again raised a rifle over his head, repeating the words of his 2000 speech.

In the 2002 film Bowling for Columbine, Michael Moore interviewed Heston at Heston's home, asking him about an April 1999 meeting the NRA held in Denver, Colorado, shortly after the Columbine High School massacre. Moore criticized Heston for the perceived thoughtlessness in the timing and location of the meeting. When Moore asked Heston for his thoughts on why gun-related homicide is so much higher in the United States than in other countries, Heston said it was because, "we have probably more mixed ethnicity" and that "we have a history of violence, perhaps more than most countries". Heston subsequently excused himself on-camera and walked away, and Moore was later criticized by some for having conducted the interview as an ambush. The interview was conducted early in 2001 before Heston publicly announced his Alzheimer's diagnosis, but the film was released afterward, causing some to say that Moore should have cut the interview from the final film.

=== Iraq war ===
In April 2003, he sent a message of support to the American forces in the Iraq War, attacking opponents of the war as "pretend patriots".

=== Abortion views ===
Heston opposed abortion and introduced Bernard Nathanson's 1987 anti-abortion documentary Eclipse of Reason, which focuses on late-term abortions. Heston served on the advisory board of Accuracy in Media, a conservative media watchdog group founded by Reed Irvine.

== Personal life ==
In March 1944, Heston married Northwestern University student Lydia Marie Clarke at Grace Methodist Church in downtown Greensboro, North Carolina.

Heston was an Episcopalian, and he has been described as "a spiritual man" with an "earthy flair", who "respected religious traditions" and "particularly enjoyed the historical aspects of the Christian faith". From 1971 to 1974, he served as president of the Episcopal Actors Guild.

=== Illness and death ===
In 1996, Heston received a hip replacement. He was diagnosed with prostate cancer in 1998. Following a course of radiation treatment, the cancer went into remission. In 2000, he publicly disclosed that he had been treated for alcoholism at a Utah clinic in May–June of that year.

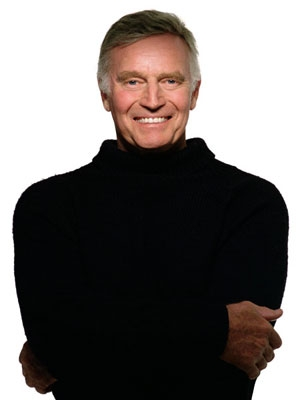
Heston in 2001

On August 9, 2002, he publicly announced (via a taped message) that he had been diagnosed with symptoms which are consistent with Alzheimer's disease. In July 2003, in his final public appearance, Heston received the Presidential Medal of Freedom at the White House from President George W. Bush. In March 2005, various newspapers reported that family and friends were shocked by the progression of his illness and that he was sometimes unable to get out of bed.

Heston died on the morning of April 5, 2008, at his home in Beverly Hills, California, with Lydia, his wife of 64 years, by his side. He was 84 years old. Heston was also survived by their son, Fraser Clarke Heston, and their daughter, Holly Ann Heston. The cause of Heston's death was not disclosed by his family. A month later, media outlets reported his death was due to pneumonia.

Early tributes came in from leading figures; President George W. Bush called Heston "a man of character and integrity, with a big heart ... He served his country during World War II, marched in the civil rights movement, led a labor union and vigorously defended Americans' Second Amendment rights." Former First Lady Nancy Reagan said that she was "heartbroken" over Heston's death and released a statement, reading, "I will never forget Chuck as a hero on the big screen in the roles he played, but more importantly I considered him a hero in life for the many times that he stepped up to support Ronnie in whatever he was doing."

Heston's funeral was held a week later on April 12, 2008, in a ceremony which was attended by 250 people including Nancy Reagan and Hollywood stars such as California Governor Arnold Schwarzenegger, Olivia de Havilland, Keith Carradine, Pat Boone, Tom Selleck, Oliver Stone (who had cast Heston in his 1999 movie Any Given Sunday), Rob Reiner, and Christian Bale.

The funeral was held at Episcopal Parish of St. Matthew's Church in Pacific Palisades, the church where Heston had regularly worshipped and attended Sunday services since the early 1980s. He was cremated and his ashes were originally given to his family yet later on his ashes were interred in the Urn Garden columbarium at St. Matthew's Episcopal Church in Pacific Palisades, California.

== Bibliography ==
By Heston:

- The Actors Life: Journals 1956–1976 (1978); ISBN 0-671-83016-3
- Beijing Diary (1990); ISBN 0-671-68706-9
- In the Arena: An Autobiography (1995); ISBN 1-57297-267-X
- Charlton Heston Presents the Bible (1997); ISBN 1-57719-270-2
- To Be a Man: Letters to My Grandson (1997); ISBN 0-7432-1311-4
- Charlton Heston's Hollywood: 50 Years in American Film (1998) with Jean-Pierre Isbouts; ISBN 1-57719-357-1
- The Courage to Be Free (2000), speeches ISBN 978-0-9703688-0-5

Non-profit organization positions
Preceded by Dana Andrews	President of the Screen Actors Guild; 1965–1971	Succeeded by John Gavin
National Rifle Association of America
Preceded by Marion Hammer	President of the NRA; 1998–2003	Succeeded by Kayne Robinson
