= Mother Lode (1982 film) =

1982 film by Charlton Heston

- Theatrical release poster
- Directed by: Charlton Heston
- Written by: Fraser Clarke Heston
- Produced by: Fraser Clarke Heston
- Starring: Charlton Heston; Nick Mancuso; Kim Basinger
- Cinematography: Richard Leiterman
- Edited by: Eric Boyd-Perkins
- Music by: Ken Wannberg
- Production company: Agamemnon Films
- Distributed by: Agamemnon Films
- Release date: 23 September 1982; (Australia)
- Running time: 101 minutes
- Language: English
- Budget: $9 million

Mother Lode (also called Search for the Mother Lode: The Last Great Treasure) is a 1982 adventure thriller film directed by and starring Charlton Heston. It was written and produced by his son Fraser Clarke Heston. The film also stars Nick Mancuso and Kim Basinger as a gold-hunting couple.

== Plot ==
Mollyco Company employee George Spalding disappears after a flight into northern British Columbia's interior wilderness to search for gold. His friend and colleague, Jean Dupre, contacts his wife Andrea to ask if George told her where he was going before he left. Dupre, who just happens to be available to search for George, having been fired after intimidating a surly manager with aerobatic manoeuvres in a Mollyco Company Cessna 206 aircraft by landing and walking away from the plane as it continues to taxi onto an active runway into the path of a landing Cessna 185, with the Mollyco executive still on board.

Together, Dupre and Spalding embark on a search in a dilapidated de Havilland Canada DHC-2 Beaver. Along the way, they recover from a mechanical breakdown and encounter native fisherman Elijah, who earnestly urges them to stay away from "the headwaters".

On arrival at the headwaters, Dupre accidentally crashes the aircraft during the water landing, yet he and Spalding survive, shaken but unhurt. From there, the pair become involved in suspicious activities with Silas McGee, a prospector and hermit intent on protecting his silver mine. Encountering his brother, Ian McGee, their search turns into a whodunit mystery/adventure, involving mistaken identities, greed and murder. When Dupre discovers the Mollyco aircraft in which George Spalding was last seen, submerged in a lake, the searchers eventually learn the truth about Spalding's disappearance.

== Cast ==
- Charlton Heston as Silas McGee / Ian McGee
- Nick Mancuso as Jean Dupre
- Kim Basinger as Andrea Spalding
- John Marley as Elijha
- Dale Wilson as Gerrard Elliot
- Rocky Zantolas as George Patterson
- Marie George as Elijha's Wife

== Production ==
Mother Lode involved members of Charlton Heston's family. While he directed and starred, his son Fraser Clarke Heston came up with the idea, wrote the script and acted as producer, while his wife Lydia is credited as still photographer. "The family firm, Agamemnon Films, produced the film, and along with several other long-lost titles it has been licensed for distribution through Warner Home Video." The featurette that accompanied the DVD release revealed: "... Fraser Heston admits to being heavily influenced by John Huston's masterpiece The Treasure of the Sierra Madre (1948) though structurally the film is like a Canuck version of Peter Benchley's The Deep: young adventurer becomes obsessed with buried treasure; voluptuous girlfriend wants to pack up and go home; eccentric but experienced treasure hunter manipulates them both."

Filming for Mother Lode took place primarily at Lake Lovely Water near Squamish, British Columbia, with most aerial scenes filmed along the Fraser River Valley. Additional photography took place near Vancouver, British Columbia.

=== Aircraft used ===
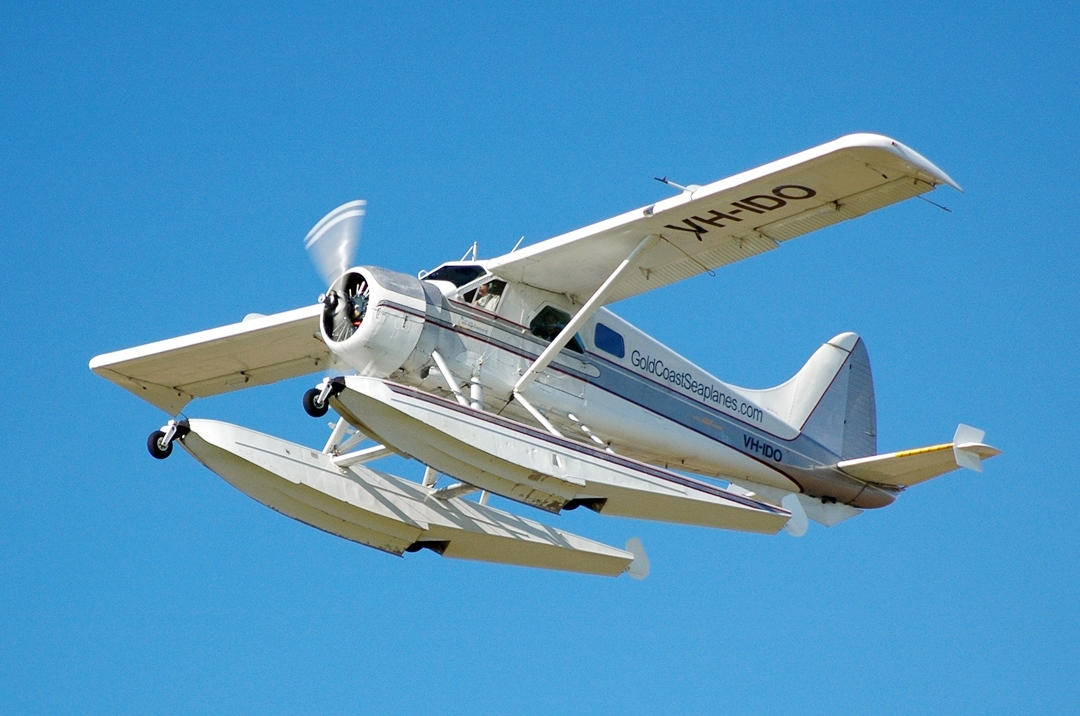
A de Havilland Canada DHC-2 Beaver Mk 1 on floats

The de Havilland Canada DHC-2 Beaver floatplane used in Mother Lode was not intended to be crashed, nor was a crash part of the original storyline. Trying a "glassy water landing", the pilot reduced his descent too late as the left float contacted, created drag and hooked, followed by the right float doing the same, whereupon all control was lost and the aircraft slewed around, flipped over, and sank. (Note: When attempting a "glassy water landing", where the glass-like surface can lead pilots into misjudging relative height and rate of descent during landing, a crash can occur. This was the case as the film clearly depicts the aircraft descending at both a high sink rate and a high rate of forward speed.) With no fiscal options remaining, the Hestons were forced to incorporate the crash into the plot. The scene is regarded by many fans as the highlight of the film.

The Beaver floatplane was recovered from the lake and transported to Kelowna, British Columbia, where it was fully restored, put back on wheels and sold to an American business, which licensed the aircraft as N323RS.

The aircraft which is landing when the Mollyco Cessna 206 wanders onto its runway is a Cessna 185, which performs an abrupt "firewall" (application of full power) and pull-up to clear the 206. Neither the Cessna 206 nor 185 was normally rated for such aerial maneuvers as depicted in the film.

The submerged Cessna floatplane is either a Cessna 180 or 185, exact model indeterminate; the wing flap width distinguishes it from a Cessna 206. It cannot be determined if the submerged aircraft was a scratch-built movie prop or an actual salvaged airframe.

== Reception ==
Mother Lode was not well received by critics. The review in TV Guide dismissed the film as "mediocre".

Variety was more positive: "As the title indicates, the consuming issue in Mother Lode is a search for gold. The picture is not without shortcomings, but is long on good performances, charismatic people in the three principal roles, compelling outdoor aerial sequences in the Cassiar Mountains of British Columbia and high-level suspense throughout."

Mother Lode had a very limited cinematic release in the United States, and a limited VHS release shortly after, with a DVD release on March 29, 2011. The film has yet to be released in Blu-ray format. In a review of the DVD version, Stuart Galbraith IV of DVD Talk thought the film worked best as a thriller and was "occasionally extremely effective".
