= List of Bat Masterson episodes =

Bat Masterson is an American Western television series which was a fictionalized account of the life of real-life marshal, gambler, and journalist Bat Masterson. The title character was played by Gene Barry, and the half-hour black-and-white series ran on NBC from 1958 to 1961. The show was produced by Ziv Television Productions. "Bat" is a nickname for Masterson's first name, Bartholemew, although in several episodes, including the 1958 pilot "Double Showdown", he says his name is William Barkley Masterson.

== Series overview ==
| Season | Episodes | Originally released | |
| Season | Episodes | First released | Last released |
|---|---|---|---|
| 1 | 37 | October 8, 1958 | July 29, 1959 |
| 2 | 37 | October 1, 1959 | July 1, 1960 |
| 3 | 34 | September 29, 1960 | June 1, 1961 |

== Episodes ==
=== Season 1 (1958–1959) ===
| No. overall | No. in season | Title | Directed by | Written by | Original release date |
|---|---|---|---|---|---|
| 1 | 1 | "Double Showdown" | Walter Doniger | Story by : Andy White & Frank Pittman; Teleplay by : Gene Levitt | October 8, 1958 |
Arizona, June 20, 1883. Big Keel Roberts, owner of the Oriental gambling hall, has his men causing trouble at competing hall Alhambra, trying to shut it down. William Barkley "Bat" Masterson shows up to help a friend keep the Alhambra open. After a gun fight at the Alhambra, Marshal Ed Caulder closes down both halls in the interest of public safety. Keel offers Masterson an opportunity to settle things once and for all - one hand of poker, winner take all. Lucy Slater, a former love interest of Masterson and Big Keel's main dealer at the Oriental, is the dealer. Masterson pulls Keel away from the Oriental to play their hand in the street. Bat has Keel deal the hand, stopping Keel at the last card and forcing him to set the deck on the table and deal only the top card. Keel loses the hand and Bat has the Marshal pull the bottom card, revealing it to be Keel's winning ace. Exposed as a crooked game, Keel is forced to leave town. In an alternate ending, Bat lets Lucy deal the hand at the Oriental. Bat forces Lucy to deal from the top of the deck, winning the hand. Keel heads up the stairs while his men shoot at Bat, missing and hitting Lucy. Bat shoots them both and calls Keel down the stairs. As Keel draws, Bat shoots and kills Keel. Lucy is only injured, and Bat carries her away. Guest cast : Robert Middleton as Big Keel Roberts, Jean Willes as Lucy Slater, Charles Maxwell as Marshal Ed Caulder
| 2 | 2 | "Two Graves for Swan Valley" | Walter Doniger | Story by : Andy White & Frank Pittman; Teleplay by : Andy White | October 15, 1958 |
Swan Valley, Wyoming territory, August 11, 1883. Bat is flirting with saloon girl, Molly Doyle (Marcia Henderson). Leader of the local renegades, Sgt. Foley (Broderick Crawford) walks into the saloon and sees Bat with his girl. Foley tells Bat to get out of town, but Bat says he'll be back. Justice of the peace Tom Noble (Raymond Bailey) and stableman Pete (Paul Lambert) both tell Bat he'd be smart to leave town. Molly comes to Bat's hotel room to tell him he should leave town or Foley will kill him. At the saloon, Noble tries to get Bat to leave town as a vagrant, but Bat declares he is a professional gambler and is working in the saloon as owner Angus McLarnin's (Patrick McVey) partner. Walking back to the hotel, Foley's renegades ride through town, shooting at Bat, who kills one of the men. The next morning, Angus offers Bat a room above the saloon. That night, Foley and his gang face down Bat at the saloon. In the ensuing shootout, Foley shoots Bat, who shoots Foley, who then shoots and kills Molly. After Molly is buried, Bat says he won't leave town until he knows Foley is dead. When Foley's men come to the saloon to confront Bat, he kills one, forcing the other to take him to Foley, who Bat kills in a shootout. Leaving town, Pete tells Bat he's brought good back to the town. Noting that Molly is dead, Bat says that some of the good is gone, to which Pete replies that most of the bad is also gone. Guest cast : Broderick Crawford
| 3 | 3 | "Dynamite Blows Two Ways" | Bernard Girard | Gene Levitt | October 22, 1958 |
August 21, 1880, Laramie, Wyoming. Bat wins 1000 head of cattle from rancher Jim Thompson (Tyler McVey) in a high stakes poker game. They're worth $5000 in Laramie, but $25,000 if he can get them to Cheyanne, but it's a difficult trip. Rancher Raoul Cummings (Reed Hadley) offers $10 per head, but Bat refuses. Jim has other cattle and hired wranglers and suggests to Bat that if they work together, they stand a better chance of getting them all the Cheyenne. Another rancher, Valorie Mitchell (Susan Cummings) joins them. Along the way, they decide on the river route as it's easier. When they camp for the night, Raoul sneaks into Valerie's camp and she tells him the route they are taking the cattle. The next day, as they make the halfway point, Valerie tells Bat that Raoul has set a trap, telling Bat she didn't want him to get killed. They decide to take the canyon route instead. Raoul and his men are watching from afar and he has already planned for the canyon route, expecting Valerie would double-cross him. Bat expects Raoul to have accounted for their change in route, and he rides ahead. When he comes upon Raoul and his men, he shoots the dynamite they set to fill the canyon, bringing a landslide comes down on Raoul and his men. Bat, Jim, Valerie, and the wranglers arrive with the cattle in Cheyenne. Guest cast : Reed Hadley, Susan Cummings, Tyler McVey
| 4 | 4 | "Stampede at Tent City" | David Friedkin | Morton Fine & David Friedkin | October 29, 1958 |
Nevada, September 5, 1886. Bat encounters a group of wranglers led by Clark Benson (William Conrad) herding what they claim to be wild horses, but Bat notes that wild horses don't wear metal shoes. Riding into town, Bat encounters Joe Best (James Best) who is being held for shooting Clark's brother in the back, which Joe denies. An old flame of Bat's, Laura Hopkins, has sent for Bat because she is in love with Joe, and she's worried they will hang him before the circuit judge comes around for a trial. Clark says he's going to hang Joe after a trial, but he's not waiting for the circuit rider. Bat tells the townspeople that the horses being driven into town are shod and branded, and silence from them is the same as being party to horse thieving, just as remaining silent when a lynch mob is trying to hang Joe is being party to lynching. Clark starts his own trial for Joe. While Clark prepares to hang Joe, Bat and Laura cause the horses to stampede, disrupting the hanging. In the confusion, Bat and Laura free Joe and put him on a horse to escape. Clark tries to stop him, but Joe's horse rears up and tramples Clark. As Joe says he and Laura are going to ride on, Bat says that he promised to save him from a lynching but not from facing a trial. He says he thinks Joe could have shot Clark's brother in the back. Joe fights with Bat, and Bat subdues him. Guest cast : William Conrad, James Best, Joan Marshall
| 5 | 5 | "The Fighter" | Eddie Davis | Turnley Walker | November 5, 1958 |
Silverton, Colorado, May 20, 1886. Bat breaks up a prize fight with Jim Bemis (Patrick Waltz) because his manager, Bull Kirby (Robert J. Wilke), is risking the safety of the fighters. Later, gambling in the saloon, Kirby comes in to play poker with Bat. Bat wants to buy Bemis's contract, but Kirby won't sell. Bat wins all of Kirby's money, so Bat offers him $500 for Bemis's contract to keep playing. Polly Landers (Marie Windsor) is partners with Kirby in the fights. She seeks to partner with Bat. After Bemis has healed up from the last fight, Kirby meets with Bat to organize another fight. Bat meets with Polly to bet all he has on Jim, but she allows Kirby's men hold Bat in Polly's room while the fight goes on. Bat escapes and makes it down to the fight and exposes the fight as fixed. Bat fights Kirby and knocks him out cold. Afterwards, Bat puts Jim on a stage to San Francisco with the name of a boxing manager to look up when he gets there. Guest cast : Marie Windsor, Robert J. Wilke, Patrick Waltz
| 6 | 6 | "Bear Bait" | Bernard Girard | Andy White | November 12, 1958 |
The Montana Rockies, October 12, 1885. Shapley Howell (James Westerfield), his sister Joyce (Patricia Donahue), and their guide Roger (Bobby Hall) are stopped by a U.S. Marshal (Wayne Burson) who's searching for a gang of bank robbers. Shapley kills him. In town, Sheriff Clark (Milton Frome) tells Bat that Shapley is looking for a guide into the Canadian Rockies to hunt a trophy bear, but Bat doesn't want to do a guide job. The sheriff tells Bat the job isn't really to guide him, but to get the reward for his capture. Bat meets with Shapley and agrees to take them into Canada. Once out in the mountains, Bat baits a tree for Shapley to get a trophy bear. In town, Sheriff Clark receives notice that Shapley is now wanted for murder. As he rides out to meet up with Bat's hunting party, Joyce distracts Bat while Shapley shoots the sheriff from a distance. Hall knocks out Bat, and Shapley and Hall tie Bat to the tree with the bear bait. When Joyce and Shapley arrive at their hideout cabin, Bat is already there. He subdues both of them. When Roger gets there, Bat knocks him out cold. Guest cast : James Westerfield, Patricia Donahue, Milton Frome, Bobby Hall
| 7 | 7 | "A Noose Fits Anybody" | Eddie Davis | John Elliotte | November 19, 1958 |
A Nebraska cow town, July 26, 1884. Gun slinger Ben Thompson (Robert Swan) saves Bat Masterson's life, but Ben is hurt in the process. In return, Bat says he'll ride up to Ogallala as Ben's kid brother Billy (Gary Vinson) is sentenced to hang for a killing he didn't do. In Ogallala, Big Ed Bacon (Murvyn Vye) and Sheriff Griff Hanley (William Henry) tell Bat that if he's in town to stop Billy Thompson from hanging, he's wasting his time. Acrobat Lola Faire (Ernestine Clark) tells Bat about what happened to Bill: A man won a lot of money at the Golden Peacock; Big Ed and Ray Clinton (Les Hellman) killed him, and Billy was shot trying to help the man. They accused him of the murder. After meeting Big Ed at the Golden Peacock, Bat heads to the Sheriff's office to get Billy out his cell, but Billy has a splint on his leg. Bat hides a gun in Billy's splint but before they can escape, the sheriff comes to and locks Bat in Billy's cell. Later, Bat calls the sheriff into the cell area, draws the gun hidden in Billy's splint, but suggests that before they get Billy free, he'd like to make the town a little better. He puts the sheriff on the gallows and gets him to start talking. As he's about to expose Big Ed, Big Ed pulls the lever for the gallows, but Bat had cut the rope. As sheriff Hanley tells the truth about Big Ed and Meeks, the two men open fire on Bat, but Bat kills them both. Guest cast : Murvyn Vye, William Henry, Gary Vinson
| 8 | 8 | "Dude's Folly" | Otto Lang | Don Brinkley | November 26, 1958 |
Fortune City, Nevada, November 25, 1882. Siblings Woody (Joe Turkel) and Jan Larkin (Nancy Hadley) have come to town to take over their father's store after he had been killed in Joe Quince's (Leo Gordon) mine. After realizing that Quince wants their store, Jan asks Bat to teach Woody to use a gun. Local blackjack dealer Ellie Winters (Allison Hayes) tells Bat that she thinks Quince killed the Larkin's father and that Bat should stay out of it. Packy Morrow (Jack Reitzen) comes by the store to shoot it up, as Bat comes out of the saloon and shoots Packy off his horse. Packy runs into the alley, Bat catches him and forces Packy to talk. As Packy tells Bat that Quince wants the Larkins' store, Quince shows up and shoots Packy before he can reveal more. Later, Bat shows the Larkins a map of their property and how it aligns with Quince's mining property. He believes that the vein that has run dry in Quince's mine runs through the Larkin property. Woody heads to the saloon to face Quince. Quince tells woody to leave town, and Woody shoots Quince in the back. Bat goes looking for Woody. Hiding at the store, Woody tries to get the drop on Bat, but Bat shoots him in the gun hand, then takes him to the marshal. Jan tells Bat that Woody's trial is in Carson City. Bat tells her maybe they'll go easy on Woody as Quince had baited him. Ellie asks Bat to come back after the trial, and he tells her he'll be back. Guest cast : Leo Gordon, Nancy Hadley, Joe Turkel, Allison Hayes
| 9 | 9 | "The Treasure of Worry Hill" | John Rich | Gene Levitt | December 3, 1958 |
Tonopa, Nevada, 1882. Cousins Caulder Larson (Ross Martin), Abigail Feather (Audrey Dalton), and Richard Woodman (Bob Anderson) hire Bat, offering him $10,000 to help them find a $100,000 left to them by their recently deceased uncle, Felix Feather. Their uncle left them each a piece of a map to where the money was hidden, requiring the untrustworthy cousins to work together. Before accepting the job, Bat seeks to verify their story with hermit millionaire Isaac Parker (Harvey Stephens), who lives in a castle and had been partners with their late uncle. Parker tells Bat that Felix died a pauper, but yes, he had buried the money at "Worry Hill". Bat agrees to the job and takes the maps from the cousins, memorizes it, then burns the pieces, requiring the cousins to not double-cross him. A mysterious stranger has been following Bat from the beginning. Bat finally catches up with the stranger, only to find he's been shot by Parker. Before the stranger dies, he tells Bat that Parker wants the map because he and Felix had made their stake by robbing a bank before heading west and had killed two men. The $100,000 Felix hid was still in the bank's money bags, which would prove Parker a murderer. Bat rides to Parker's castle where Parker tries to kill him, but as Bat heads for the money bags, Parker chases him, falls from the organ loft, and dies. Bat tells the cousins the money belongs to the Omaha bank and they will split the 5% reward between them. Guest cast : Audrey Dalton, Ross Martin, Harvey Stephens, Bob Anderson
| 10 | 10 | "Cheyenne Club" | Walter Doniger | D. D. Beauchamp | December 17, 1958 |
August 1881, Cheyenne, Wyoming. At the Cheyenne Club, Bat meets with John Conant (William Tannen) who has sent for Bat to check out a crooked card game. His daughter, Sara Lou Conant (Louise Fletcher) is engaged to Steven Haley (Dean Harens), and John has heard that Haley cheats at cards. Later, it turns out Bat knows Haley, and knows him to be a card mechanic. Bat reveals to Haley that there's a rumor about a crooked card game. Haley tells Bat he believes John Pate (Karl Swenson) is the one spreading the rumor, and that Pate doesn't like that Haley has fenced in his homestead, preventing Pate, who is an open range rancher, from running cattle through it. In the card game, Haley bets it all, including his homestead, against Pate. Haley shows four sevens, but Pate says it doesn't beat his four kings, showing three kings and a jack. Haley says he must have misread his hand, and leaves in anger. Later, Bat tells Conant the game is crooked and that it's not Haley, but doesn't reveal the cheat. Meeting Pate at the bar, Bat hands Pate the fourth king, revealing he knows that Pate is the cheat. Pate's men try to assassinate Bat, who foils their attempt, turning the men over to the marshal (Frank Warren). Bat decides to stay at the club and live it up for a week. Guest cast : Karl Swenson, Dean Harens, William Tannen, Louise FletcherAlso appearing: Olan Soule
| 11 | 11 | "Sherman's March Through Dodge City" | Eddie Davis | Maurice Tombragel | December 24, 1958 |
Dodge City, Kansas, 1880. The marshal (Michael Whalen) asks Bat to help with the arrival of President Rutherford B. Hayes (Joseph Hamilton) and General William T. Sherman (John Gallaudet). He needs Bat to guard Sherman in a town full of Texas cowboys. Bat finds Luke Cavender (Robert Stevenson) in a card game, and tells Luke and his boys to get out of town while Sherman is a guest in Dodge. Bat takes Sherman on a tour of Dodge as Sherman wants to experience the dance halls, gambling, girls, and cowboys. Meanwhile, Luke and his boys are planning an assassination. Bat takes Sherman to the Palace Bar, where the bartender (Charlie Crafts) pours drinks for everyone and toasts Sherman, who asks the piano player to play the Virginia reel. Sherman wants a whirl with a dance hall girl. At the dance hall, Cherry (Darlene Fields) confronts Sherman with ire from the war, but Sherman charms her by asking her to dance. Cherry asks the General to forgive her behavior. They head to the Alhambra, where Sherman plays roulette. While there, Bat sees Drew (William Joyce) and says he thought he told them to get out of town. Drew says he went along with Luke when it was throwing eggs, but killing the General is another thing entirely. Drew takes Bat to where Luke is set up to assissinate the General, but he doublecrosses Bat who then shoots Drew with a derringer pistol he had taken from Cherry earlier. When Bat confronts Luke in the alley, where Luke is shot. The next day, as Sherman boards the train, he thanks Bat and mentions Dodge is no more exciting than Peoria. As the presidential train pulls out, Bat drops his badge into the marshal's hat. Guest cast : John Gallaudet, Robert J. Stevenson, Michael Whalen, William Joyce, Darlene Fields
| 12 | 12 | "Trail Pirate" | Bernard Girard | Wells Root | December 31, 1958 |
July 27, 1879, Good Springs in the Nevada desert. A wagon train trail boss has turned up murdered. The sheriff (Jim Bannon) suspects trail pirates of changing signs on the trail, sending the wagons away from water, then robbing and murdering them when they run out of water. Bat says he will lead the next wagon train. Ellen Parish (Gloria Talbott), leader of the next wagon train, doesn't trust Bat, since he's a gambler and lives by the gun. She hires Egan (Barry Atwater) to lead the train. Bat rides to the desert to follow the wagon train anyway, where he finds the remains of the previous train. A dust storm blows up and Egan calls on the wagon train to stop until the storm passes. During the storm, a rattlesnake startles Bat's horse and he is thrown to the ground. After the storm has past, while the others break camp, Egan rides ahead saying he's going to look for the trail marker. Out on the trail, Egan changes the signs. Meanwhile, Bat stumbles into the camp on foot, blinded from the sandstorm. As Egan rides back into camp, he accuses Bat of being the trail pirate and has Bat chained to one of the wagons. When they get to the marker, Bat claims the signs have been switched and that there's no water in the wrong direction. The wagon train follows Egan's lead. Later, Egan meets up with his partners, revealing the real trail pirates. As Bat tries to escape, Ellen helps him. Bat rides past the camp of the trail pirates and a shootout ensues, and Bat captures the trail pirates. As they ride on to Sunday Springs, Ellen invites Bat to ride on to California with them. Guest cast : Gloria Talbott, Barry Atwater, Jim Bannon, Howard Wright Also appearing: Hank Patterson
| 13 | 13 | "Double Trouble in Trinidad" | Montgomery Pittman | Story by : Richard O'Connor; Teleplay by : Mikhail Rykoff and Richard O'Connor | January 7, 1959 |
Silver City, Nevada, May 1883. A traveling salesman reveals to Bat that the sheriff in Trinidad is going by the name Bat Masterson. Arriving in Trinidad, Bat checks into the hotel under the name of Robertson. Jessie Simmons (Yvette Vickers) knows Bat and tells him that Chad Hornsby (Lance Fuller) is claiming to be Bat Masterson. Between them, they don't know what Hornsby is up to. Bat heads over to the sheriff's office to meet Hornsby and his deputies, George Swift (Richard Reeves) and Sam Teller (Richard Bakalyan). Bat asks to get hired on as a deputy, but Hornsby says he doesn't need any. Asking the local bartender for information, Bat learns that the government opened a transfer station in town for gold shipments, and there is a shipment coming in tomorrow. Bat (as Robertson), checks out of the hotel, telling the clerk he's leaving town, but he doubles back as the gold shipment comes in, foiling Hornsby's attempt to steal the gold and revealing that he is Bat Masterson. Back in Silver City, Bat rejoins his regular poker game. Guest cast : Gloria Talbott, Barry Atwater, Jim Bannon, Howard Wright
| 14 | 14 | "Election Day" | Monroe P. Askins | Turnley Walker | January 14, 1959 |
Protection, Kansas, 1878. Bat rides into town after a 500 mile cattle drive, boarding the herd with livery owner Joe Rankin (Dan Sheridan). Teddy Wright (Peter Hanson) tells Bat there's a town ordinance of $2/head to get his cattle out of town, which Bat refuses. Rankin tells Bat that Wright is good with a gun and no one will stand up to him. Bat becomes aware that the traveling dancing show led by Kitty Meadows (Kasey Rogers) is being charged an "entertainment fee". At the saloon, Wright attempts to charge Bat a "table fee" to join the poker game when the sheriff (Vance Skarstedt) breaks up a potential standoff between them, telling Bat that the mayor wants to see him. Mayor Oliver Hinton (Gene Roth) tells Bat these fees are city ordinances. Hinton runs the town for his own profit, runs for mayor unopposed, and Wright is his enforcer. Bat convinces Rankin to run for mayor and organizes the local townsfolk to stand up to Hinton, Wright, and their gang. The sheriff meets with Bat and tells him he was sheriff long before Hinton came to town, and he wants to help Rankin. At the debate between Hinton and Rankin, Wright draws Bat into a standoff. Bat shoots Wright in the gun hand and tells the town to settle this with ballots instead of bullets. On election day, Kitty, Bat, and the town celebrate Rankin's win as mayor. As Bat rides out of town, he knocks down a "Hinton for Mayor" sign with his cane. Guest cast : Peter Hanson, Dan Sheridan, Kasey Rogers, Gene Roth, Vance Skarstedt
| 15 | 15 | "One Bullet from Broken Bow" | Allen H. Miner | Andy White | January 21, 1959 |
Broken Bow, Kansas, 1876. Bat Masterson had already established himself as an Indian fighter at the Battle of Adobe Walls. Captain Dayton (Bob Shield) interrupts Bat's evening with Dolores Clark (Joan O'Brien), requesting he meet with General Phil Sheridan (Charles Maxwell). Stone Calf (H.M. Wynant) had attacked a homestead, killing the parents, and Sheridan believes Stone Calf is holding the two daughters, Barbara (Donna Martell) and Lori Rafferty (Susan Whitney), as prisoners. Sheridan can't spare the men because they are to meet Custer at Little Big Horn. Initially refusing to help, Bat accepts the challenge after Dolores's urging; but Bat asks Sheridan to ride south on his way so that Stone Calf's scouts will see him. Bat rides to Stone Calf's camp and tells Stone Calf that the army is coming to get the girls. He doesn't believe Bat, but a scout rides in to say he saw the army coming and Stone Calf releases the girls to Bat. As Stone Calf rides out to meet the army, he realizes he has been tricked and rides back after Bat and the girls and cut them off from the road to town. Bat and the girls take cover, and a gun fight ensues. As Bat signals the town by shooting at the town's bell, Stone Calf catches him. Having heard the bell, troops arrive. Bat brings in Stone Calf, and the general gives him a commendation. Guest cast : H. M. Wynant, Joan O'Brien, Donna Martell, Charles Maxwell, Bob Shield
| 16 | 16 | "A Personal Matter" | Eddie Davis | Fran van Hartesveldt | January 8, 1959 |
New Mexico Territory, early summer, 1881. Bat happens upon a riderless horse. Inspecting it, he is roped by Bailey Harper (Alan Hale) who recognizes Bat right away and robs him of his horse, gun, and cash. Harper warns Bat that no one in the territory will help Bat catch him. In town, Bat gets very little help from the locals, but manages to get a horse and gun. At the next town, in the stage office, Louisa Carey (Peggy Knudsen) announces to the driver (Don Eitner) that she's headed to Harper's place. Bat overhears and offers to ride shotgun on the stage. Harper's men run down the stage, but they are there to pick up Louisa with a new horse that Harper wants her to try (the one he stole from Bat). Later, Bat catches up to Louisa and ties to her horse making it appear that she decided to leave Harper to ride to Phoenix with Bat. Harper finds out, he heads out after them, and steps into Bat's trap. Bat ties him up the way Harper had done to him, then retrieves his money and his gun. Bat turns Harper over to the sheriff (Tom London) and Louisa tells Bat she's taking the stage to Phoenix. Guest cast : Alan Hale, Peggy Knudsen, Raymond Hatton, Dennis Moore, Tom London
| 17 | 17 | "License to Cheat" | Jesse Hibbs | George F. Slavin | February 4, 1959 |
Mason City, Kansas, October 1879. Ken Wills (William Phipps) claims one of the local poker games is crooked and starts a ruckus. Sheriff Jeb Crater (Douglas Kennedy) locks him up for disturbing the peace. Curly the bartender (Jean Paul King) tells Bat that there are four local games, all crooked, the sheriff controls the take and the "squawks". Bat gets a gambling license and starts his own game, as the other dealers try to convince Bat to join the "Dealers Protective Association". After Bat refuses, They accuse Bat of running a crooked game with a shaved deck. The sheriff shuts down Bat's game, arrests him, and revokes his gambling license. In the jail, Bat offers to teach Ken how to beat a crooked game. After covering their bail, Bat takes his protege to the Palace, where he starts to beat the game. Bat sits close by, giving signalls to Ken by tapping his cane. As Ken beats the various games and exposes them as crooked, the dealers pressure the sheriff to give them the protection they're paying for. They concoct a plan to put gun powder in a look-alike cane and switch the canes. A tap on the floor will trigger an explosion. Ellie Winters (Allison Hayes) warns him that they're up to something, but doesn't know what. At the next game, Bat notices every time he moves his cane, the sheriff and the observing dealers flinch. Bat realizes it's the cane, and as they draw down on him, he hurls the cane at them and it explodes. Guest cast : Douglas Kennedy, Allison Hayes, William Phipps, Brett King, James Winslow, Frank J. Scannell, Jean Paul King
| 18 | 18 | "Sharpshooter" | John Rich | Maurice Tombragel | February 11, 1959 |
Dodge City, Kansas, May 1883. Saloon owner Harry Varden (Conrad Nagel) owes Bat several thousand dollars. Sharpshooter Danny Dowling (Paul Dubov) is performing in Varden's saloon and happens to owe Varden quite a bit of money. Varden offers to forgive Dubov's debt if he kills Bat. Danny's wife and assistant Lori La Rue (Lisa Gaye) finds out. She warns Bat to leave town, although she doesn't know who hired Danny. Not knowing that Varden is the one, Bat asks Varden to help find out who is staking Danny. Bat confronts Danny during a part of the show where Danny brings an audience member into the act. Danny shoots a cigar out of Bat's mouth, while Bat draws from his holster and shoots the cigar out of Danny's hand while Danny is raising the cigar. Danny tries to back out of the contract, but Varden refuses to let him and has additional men to make sure he follows through. Bat finds out Lori is pregnant and goes to help Danny confront Varden and his men. Bat offers Varden a way out of his debt - $10,000 for controlling interest in the Palace saloon and that Varden leave town, and if he refuses he'd sell the IOU to Varden's hired guns. Bat puts Danny and Lori to work running the Palace. Guest cast : Conrad Nagel, Paul Dubov, Lisa Gaye Also appearing: Harry Fleer
| 19 | 19 | "River Boat" | Walter Doniger | Gene Levitt | February 18, 1959 |
Dakota Territory, Summer 1883. Passengers on a riverboat are asked to check-in their guns before boarding. Bat heads to the captain's (Robert Nash) office to put his money in the safe and realizes the ship has been commandeered by pirates, led by King Henry (Jacques Aubuchon). King Henry collects several of the women and holds them as hostages, while the men are instructed to inform all of the passengers to bring everything they have to the captain's quarters. Kyle Henderson (Brett Halsey) and McCabe (Byron Morrow) intend to forcibly oppose King Henry, which Bat discourages. Bat uses Kyle's sister Nora (Patricia Powell) to distract King Henry's man Paulson (Walter Barnes) so he can listen in to King Henry's plans, which are to off-load at "Trader's Dock", a ghost town gateway to the badlands. Bat hides in a barrel of rare cheeses, which the pirates load with their loot at Trader's Dock. As the pirates make their way to the badlands, at night Bat springs his trap and captures them. Guest cast : Jacques Aubuchon, Patricia Powell, Walter Barnes, Clark Howat, Brett Halsey
| 20 | 20 | "Battle of the Pass" | Alan Crosland, Jr. | Don Brinkley | February 25, 1959 |
Omaha, Nebraska, 1886. Mace Pomeroy (Wayne Morris) asks Bat to help ensure his railroad beats another to a specific canyon that will make an ideal roadbed. Bat won't do it unless Pomeroy pays an old debt first, which he refuses to pay in advance. Bat seeks out the competing rail boss, General Zachary Moran (Emile Meyer) and offers to get him to the canyon first, for a $1 fee. Bat intends to get to the canyon to hold it, and then backtrack. Bat recruits Billy Willow (Will Wright) as his scout. At the canyon, Pomeroy has beat them there and holds the high ground with 50 men and rifles. Masterson meets with Pomeroy and agrees to yield the canyon for $5,000. Bat points out to Moran that the canyon isn't well suited as a rail roadbed, but the river that has dried up is a straight course and is a better plan. When Pomeroy realizes he's been had, he comes after Bat, but Bat and Willow get the drop on him. Bat talks Moran into a poker game for the $5,000. Guest cast : Wayne Morris, Will Wright, Roy Engel, Emile Meyer
| 21 | 21 | "Marked Deck" | Otto Lang | Story by : Charles B. Smith; Teleplay by : Mikhail Rykoff | March 11, 1959 |
Morganville, Wyoming Territory, 1881. Amelia Roberts (Cathy Downs) and her brother William (Richard Emory) have been swindled by Dan Morgan (Denver Pyle) on a land deal. Thinking they were buying an idyllic farm, Morgan sold them a dried-up mine. They hire Bat to help them, who convinces Morgan that he bought 2 1/2 acres of the property for $500 because he believes there is silver in the slag. Bat gets Morgan to offer to buy back the property, which the Roberts are willing to trade in exchange for the farm they originally thought they were buying. Morgan agrees, as long as there is silver on the property, and also buys Bat's share for $1,000. After the assayer (Ollie O'Toole) lets Morgan know that while there is silver present, it's not worth mining. Guest cast : Denver Pyle, Cathy Downs, Phil Chambers, Richard Emory Also appearing: Phil Chambers
| 22 | 22 | "Incident in Leadville" | Alan Crosland, Jr. | Harry Essex | March 18, 1959 |
Leadville, Colorado, April, 1879. The Leadville Post, edited by Jo Hart (Kathleen Crowley), has printed an article describing Bat as a notorious gunfighter, including him with the likes of King Fisher (Jack Lambert). Her disdain for Bat stems from his killing Jack Wagner, who Bat explains killed his brother, Ed. Roy Evens (Edward Platt) welcomes Bat to his saloon, hoping Bat will help him shut down the newspaper, which has published negative articles about him, too, but Bat isn't interested in joining forces. Instead, Bat helps Jo distribute her newspaper. Bat learns of a plot by Evens and his henchman Jess Santola (John Cliff) to sabotage the paper and follows Santola out of town. When Fisher arrives with the same intention, to shut down the paper, a gunfight ensues between all of the men and Fisher is shot. Bat captures Evens and takes him to town to confess his plot, which Bat publishes in the paper. Jo asks Bat to stay and work on the paper, but he defers, saying that maybe someday he'd have enough to write about. Guest cast : Kathleen Crowley, Edward Platt, John Cliff, Jack Lambert, Jonathan Hole
| 23 | 23 | "The Tumbleweed Wagon" | Walter Doniger | Wells Root | March 25, 1959 |
Summer, 1881. Bat arrives in Concho to transport Luke Steiger (Paul Lambert) to Fort Smith to hang for murder. Sheriff Vince Morgan (John Carradine) is presiding over a wedding of Luke to Julie Poe (Fay Spain), who believes Luke was justified in the killing. During the ceremony, Julie passes a gun to Luke, but Bat stops her. The now jailed Julie passes a special bullet for Luke to place in the lock that will explode when the Sheriff pushes in the key. The explosion bends the key and Luke is unable to free Julie, but tells her he will meet the tumbleweed wagon to free her. On the road to Fort Smith, Bat tries to convince Julie that Luke is an outlaw and is just using her. At a river crossing, Julie asks for a last bath before being taken to the Fort Smith jail. To prevent her escape, Bat takes her clothes. Luke arrives and gives Julie clothes and a gun to get the drop on Bat. Ultimately, Luke shoots Bat. As they effect their escape, Julie realizes Bat was right about Luke. As they stop, Bat appears, having hidden in the back of the wagon and Luke is shot and killed. At Fort Smith, Bat has convinced Julie to tell the truth to the judge. Bat tells Julie he'll ask for clemency. Guest cast : Fay Spain, Paul Lambert, John Carradine
| 24 | 24 | "Brunette Bombshell" | Alan Crosland, Jr. | John Elliotte | April 1, 1959 |
Denver, Colorado. Bat arrives from Dodge City to find his newly purchased boxing club being closed down as a condemned property, where he meets Isabel Fowler (Rebecca Welles), the sister of Mayor Monroe Fowler (George Eldridge). At a meeting of the city commissioners, Isabel introduces Bat to Police Commissioner Whit Marrison (Gene Nelson), Fire Commissioner Ross (Dan Riss), and Health Commissioner Clint (Jack Mann). They refuse to explain to Bat why his property has been condemned. Whit offers to pay Bat what he paid for the property to make him whole, but Bat refuses. When Bat opens his club anyway, Whit has him arrested. In jail, Whit offers to pay Bat's fine in exchange for him releasing his club. When Whit meets with Isabel, they discuss their plans to build a casino. Later, Whit blackmails Bat's boxing trainer, Marty (Charles Fredericks) to plant dynamite in the club's punching bag. Bat catches Marty putting the dynamite in the bag. He goes to confront the mayor to make him aware of the grift and murder going on under his nose. On the club's opening day, Bat, the mayor, Ross, and Clint are waiting for Whit who has not shown up. The Mayor tells Ross and Clint they are fired for corruption. He says Isabel has confessed her part. Isabel brings in Whit at gunpoint. Having planned to have a gunman shoot the bag from across the street to detonate the dynamite at noon, Whit steps in front of the bag and is gunned down. Guest cast : Gene Nelson, Rebecca Welles, Charles Fredericks, George Eldredge, Dan Riss, Jack Mann
| 25 | 25 | "Deadline" | John Rich | George F. Slavin | April 8, 1959 |
Webster, Texas, 1887, Riding on a stage, Bat and his fellow passenger, Lorna Adams (Eve Brent) are left stranded when the stage is held up by Jay Simms (Harry Dean Stanton) and Tim Mint (Ken Lynch). Left alone to walk the Texas desert, Lorna tells Bat how she is trying to get to the governor to stop the execution of her fiancée, Jimmy, who is accused of a murder he didn't commit. Bat uses smoke signals to call for help, and several Indians arrive. Bat trades his cane for a horse. Jay and Mint show up and capture Bat and Lorna. It turns out that Mint is the man that Jimmy was mistaken for in the murder charge, and they intend to prevent Lorna from getting to the governor to stop the execution. Bat gets Jay and Mint to turn on each other and in the shootout, Jay is killed. Bat turns Mint in at the governor's office, Jimmy is released. Bat returns to the Indians and trades two horses to get his cane back. Guest cast : Ken Lynch, Harry Dean Stanton, Eve Brent
| 26 | 26 | "Man of Action" | Alan Crosland, Jr. | Gene Levitt | April 22, 1959 |
Junction, New Mexico territory, Spring, 1881. Bat rides into town to find Oliver Jenkins (Gavin Muir), a London tailor, to ask him to make a new suit. Jenkins tells Bat how Jess Hobart (Harold J. Stone), who owns the Blue Chip Saloon, runs the town. Jenkins heads a committee to bring law and order to Junction, but Bat believes that without a gun to back things up, there is no respect for the law. On his way to the committee meeting, Jenkins is kidnapped by two of Hobart's thugs. Jenkins's daughter, Deborah (Joan Elan), warns Bat to stay away from her father, believing it would be safer for her father. Bat makes his way to Hobart's ranch where they are holding Jenkins. While trying to escape, a gunfight ensues and Jenkins refuses to use a gun. In the gunfight, Hobart is seemingly killed and Jenkins is shot but survives. After being freed, Jenkins leaves the tailor business to set up a town council and manage its affairs, but he tells Bat he will make one last suit. Guest cast : Harold J. Stone, Joan Elan, Gavin Muir, Mickey Simpson
| 27 | 27 | "A Matter of Honor" | Walter Doniger | Wells Root | April 29, 1959 |
July 1885, Apache Springs, last stop on the trail to the gold strike at Telegraph Pass. Stopping in Apache Springs on his way to Telegraph Pass, Bat confronts Chip Grimes (John Vivyan) outside Grimes's casino and mentions the crooked game he ran in Deadwood. As Bat buys into the game with $10,000, Aton von Landi (Stephen Bekassy) overhears. Anton later tries to rob the casino. Dance hall girl Millie Wilkins (Paula Raymond) explains to Bat that Anton is a count from Europe who joined the wrong side and escaped to America, and he wants to marry her. Bat offers to hire her at the new casino he intends to build at Telegraph Pass. Bat gets an immediate trial for Anton with Judge Dorset (Kenneth MacDonald), who sentences Anton to five years, suspending all but four months, which he'll serve at the convict labor camp at Telegraph Pass. He appoints Bat to deliver him to the camp. At the labor camp, Bat meets with camp manager Tack Colby (Kenneth MacDonald), whom he knows. Tack can't take another prisoner with so few guards, but Bat pledges Anton won't try to escape. But when Anton finds out Millie is back working for Grimes, he escapes. Bat is forced to leave Telegraph Pass to track down Anton, finding him in Apache Springs with Millie. When Grimes uses the sheriff to go after them, Bat shows the sheriff how Grimes rigged his roulette wheel, freeing the sheriff from obligation to Grimes. When he catches up to the others at the prison camp, he finds Anton and Millie are married and that the gold strike at Telegraph Pass is bust. Guest cast : Paula Raymond, John Vivyan, Stephen Bekassy, Kenneth MacDonald, Morris Ankrum, Keith Richards
| 28 | 28 | "Lottery of Death" | Walter Doniger | Don Ingalls | May 13, 1959 |
Tucson, Arizona. In a poker game with Andrew Stafford (John Sutton), Jack Latigo (Myron Healey), and Sonny Parsons (Warren Oates), Bat accepts a $100,000 lottery ticket as payment on a note from Sonny. Offering to split it, Bat tears the ticket in half. In the morning, the ticket is the winner, but Bat is unaware. Meanwhile, Sonny's sister Gwen (Constance Ford) shows up looking for him. When Bat has the hotel manager (Len Hendry) put his money in the safe, he realizes he and Sonny have the winning ticket. Stafford finds Sonny sleeping in the livery loft, steals the half of the ticket and kills Sonny. Bat tells Gwen he suspects Latigo and Stafford. Gwen tells Bat about the family ranch that she and Sonny had hoped to buy back, but they needed $75,000, and also that she wouldn't suspect Stafford. Bat contacts Stafford and Latigo individually, laying a trap to find the murderer. He knocks out Stafford and secures the ticket, but Latigo tries to get it from him and Latigo is shot in the struggle. Bat gives $75,000 to Gwen for the ranch. When she says that's more than Sonny's half, Bat says he wants an interest in the ranch, which Gwen decides to call the 50/50. Guest cast : John Sutton, Constance Ford, Myron Healey, Warren Oates
| 29 | 29 | "The Death of Bat Masterson" | Alan Crosland, Jr. | Don Brinkley | May 20, 1959 |
Bonanza, Colorado, 1882. Bat Masterson comes to Bonanza to close a bank account with $20,000 from a cattle drive the previous year. The bank manager (Willard Waterman) informs him the account was closed by order of the probate court and the proceeds given to Mrs. Masterson three months earlier. A. J. Mulcaney (Cliff Edwards), the mortician, confirms Bat Masterson was buried with his derby hat and cane. Upon paying a visit to Judge D. B. Hodie (Sam Buffington), Hodie orders the sheriff to take Bat out of town. Before leaving town, Bat catches the judge sending a telegram to Jack Fontana, who is hiding under the name Jack Foster, warning him that Bat has returned. The sheriff fights with Bat and knocks him out, and the judge orders him to jail. Meanwhile, on the Foster ranch, Jack (Claude Atkins) and Nellie (Ruta Lee) have received the telegram from Hodie. Their conversation reveals they bribed the judge and that the body buried as Bat was gunned down by Jack. While in jail, Bat cleans out the sheriff in a card game but gives it back to him if the sheriff lets him out of jail. At the ranch, Hodie arrives and informs Nellie that Bat is in jail. As Hodie leaves the ranch house, Jack shoots him in the back. Bat shows up in the ranch house and Nellie reveals to him what they've done. She takes him to Jack and in the confrontation, Bat shoots and kills Jack. The bank manager gives Bat the deed for the ranch, which Bat asks him to sell, indicating he'd rather have the cash. Guest cast : Claude Akins, Ruta Lee, Willard Waterman, Cliff Edwards, Sam Buffington, George Cisar
| 30 | 30 | "The Secret is Death" | Otto Lang | Mikhail Rykoff | May 27, 1959 |
Guest cast : Allison Hayes
| 31 | 31 | "Promised Land" | Walter Doniger | D.D. Beauchamp | June 10, 1959 |
| 32 | 32 | "The Conspiracy" | Alan Crosland, Jr. | Don Brinkley | June 17, 1959 |
| 33 | 33 | "The Conspiracy" | Alan Crosland, Jr. | Don Brinkley | June 24, 1959 |
Guest cast : Diane Brewster
| 34 | 34 | "The Black Pearls" | Alan Crosland, Jr. | Don Brinkley | July 1, 1959 |
Guest cast : James Coburn and Jacqueline Scott
| 35 | 35 | "The Desert Ship" | Walter Doniger | Wells Root | July 15, 1959 |
Guest cast : Karen Steele
| 36 | 36 | "The Romany Knives" | Walter Doniger | Barney Slater | July 22, 1959 |
| 37 | 37 | "Buffalo Kill" | Eddie Davis | Leo Gordon | July 29, 1959 |

=== Season 2 (1959–1960) ===
| No. overall | No. in season | Title | Guest star(s) | Directed by | Written by | Original release date |
|---|---|---|---|---|---|---|
| 38 | 1 | "To the Manner Born" | James Hong | John Rich | Wells Root | October 1, 1959 |
Bat visits his brother in St. Joseph, Missouri, only to find him running for mayor against a corrupt political machine. When thugs try to intimidate the voters, Bat dons his finest suit and cane, using charm to rally the townsfolk and his quick draw to fend off hired guns. Uncovering a vote-rigging scheme, he exposes the machine’s leader in a tense town hall confrontation. The dusty streets of St. Joseph become a battleground for democracy, as Bat’s loyalty to family drives his fight for justice. This episode blends political intrigue with Western action, showcasing Bat’s ability to navigate high society and lowlife schemes. His triumph ensures his brother’s campaign survives, proving that Bat’s elegance is as deadly as his aim. The season opens with a reminder that Bat Masterson’s honor shines brightest when defending those he loves in the wild frontier.
| 39 | 2 | "Wanted -- Dead" | John Dehner | William Conrad | Gene Levitt | October 15, 1959 |
A $5,000 bounty on Bat’s head draws a ruthless bounty hunter to Cheyenne. Mistaken for a wanted man, Bat must clear his name while dodging the hunter’s traps. Using his gambling skills, he lures the hunter into a high-stakes poker game, exposing his ties to a corrupt sheriff. In a dusty saloon showdown, Bat’s quick draw outmatches the hunter’s greed. This episode blends mistaken identity with thrilling action, as Bat navigates danger with his trademark wit. The bounty’s shadow amplifies the stakes, but Bat’s cunning turns the tables, proving his innocence and bringing the real culprits to justice. His triumph clears his name and cements his legend as a man who can outsmart any predator in the wild West, where a price on his head only sharpens his resolve to fight for truth.
| 40 | 3 | "No Funeral for Thorn" | Elisha Cook Jr., Ray Teal, Joi Lansing, Dehl Berti, John Cliff | Alan Crosland Jr. | John McGreevy | October 22, 1959 |
Western Colorado, the 1880s. Bat arrives in a mining town to find his friend Thorn accused of murder and facing a lynch mob. The real killer, a wealthy mine owner, manipulates the crowd to protect his interests. Bat infiltrates the owner’s inner circle, using charm to uncover evidence of the frame-up. When the mob storms the jail, Bat orchestrates a daring escape, leading to a tense confrontation in the mine’s depths. His sharpshooting and quick thinking expose the owner’s guilt, saving Thorn. This episode blends mystery with Western action, as Bat navigates a volatile town. The mines’ dark tunnels amplify the danger, but Bat’s loyalty to his friend drives his fight for justice. His triumph restores peace, proving that Bat Masterson’s courage can shine through even the darkest conspiracies in the rugged frontier.
| 41 | 4 | "Shakedown at St. Joe" | TBA | Alan Crosland Jr. | Maurice Tombragel | October 29, 1959 |
In St. Joseph, Bat uncovers a protection racket targeting local merchants, led by a crooked saloonkeeper. Posing as a gambler, he infiltrates the gang, using his poker skills to gain their trust. When the saloonkeeper’s goons threaten a shopkeeper’s family, Bat rallies the merchants for a stand. In a smoky saloon showdown, his quick draw and cunning expose the racket, bringing the leader to justice. This episode blends urban crime with Western drama, showcasing Bat’s ability to unite a community against corruption. The bustling streets of St. Joseph set the stage for his heroics, as he proves that his charm is as effective as his gun. His triumph frees the merchants, cementing his legend as a protector of the innocent in the wild frontier, where justice always prevails under Bat’s watchful eye.
| 42 | 5 | "Lady Luck" | Dyan Cannon | John Rich | Harry Essex | November 5, 1959 |
| 43 | 6 | "Who'll Bury My Violence?" | Jack Ging | Walter Doniger | Don Brinkley | November 12, 1959 |
| 44 | 7 | "Dead Men Don't Pay Debts" | TBA | Lew Landers | Daniel B. Ullman | November 19, 1959 |
| 45 | 8 | "Death and Taxes" | TBA | Alan Crosland Jr. | Paul Franklin | November 26, 1959 |
| 46 | 9 | "Bat Plays a Dead Man's Hand" | TBA | Otto Lang | Harry Essex | December 3, 1959 |
| 47 | 10 | "Garrison Finish" | #Frankie Darro | Eddie Davis | Maurice Tombragel | December 10, 1959 |
| 48 | 11 | "The Canvas and the Cane" | Jacqueline Scott | Walter Doniger | Don Brinkley | December 17, 1959 |
| 49 | 12 | "The Inner Circle" | Jean Willes and Frank Ferguson | Walter Doniger | Andy White | December 31, 1959 |
| 50 | 13 | "The Pied Piper of Dodge City" | Don "Red" Barry | Alan Crosland Jr. | Barney Slater | January 7, 1960 |
| 51 | 14 | "A Picture of Death" | Lisa Montell | John Rich | Samuel A. Peeples | January 14, 1960 |
| 52 | 15 | "Pigeon and Hawk" | TBA | Alan Crosland Jr. | John Tucker Battle | January 21, 1960 |
| 53 | 16 | "Flume to the Mother Lode" | TBA | Walter Doniger | Gene Levitt | January 28, 1960 |
| 54 | 17 | "Death by the Half Dozen" | TBA | Alan Crosland Jr. | Guy de Vry | February 4, 1960 |
| 55 | 18 | "Deadly Diamonds" | Kenneth Tobey and Allison Hayes | Walter Doniger | John McGreevey | February 11, 1960 |
| 56 | 19 | "Mr. Fourpaws" | TBA | Eddie Davis | D.D. Beauchamp & Mary M. Beauchamp | February 18, 1960 |
| 57 | 20 | "Six Feet of Gold" | James Coburn | Walter Doniger | Don Brinkley | February 25, 1960 |
| 58 | 21 | "Cattle and Cane" | TBA | Eddie Davis | Harry Essex | March 3, 1960 |
| 59 | 22 | "The Disappearance of Bat Masterson" | Oscar Beregi Jr. | Walter Doniger | Maurice Tombragel | March 10, 1960 |
| 60 | 23 | "The Snare" | TBA | Eddie Davis | Samuel A. Peeples | March 17, 1960 |
| 61 | 24 | "Three Bullets for Bat" | Kent Taylor | Alan Crosland Jr. | Paul Franklin | March 24, 1960 |
| 62 | 25 | "The Reluctant Witness" | Allison Hayes and Harry Lauter | William Conrad | George F. Slavin | March 31, 1960 |
| 63 | 26 | "Come Out Fighting" | TBA | Alan Crosland Jr. | Paul Franklin | April 7, 1960 |
| 64 | 27 | "Stage to Nowhere" | James Seay | Eddie Davis | Wells Root & Ron Bishop | April 14, 1960 |
| 65 | 28 | "Incident at Fort Bowie" | Will Wright | Franklin Adreon | Don Brinkley | April 21, 1960 |
| 66 | 29 | "Masterson's Arcadia Club" | X Brands | Alan Crosland Jr. | Paul Franklin | April 28, 1960 |
| 67 | 30 | "Welcome to Paradise" | TBA | James Goldstone | Guy de Vry | May 5, 1960 |
| 68 | 31 | "A Grave Situation" | TBA | Franklin Adreon | Maurice Tombragel | May 12, 1960 |
| 69 | 32 | "Gold Is Where You Steal It" | TBA | Alan Crosland Jr. | Michael Fessier | May 19, 1960 |
| 70 | 33 | "Wanted -- Alive Please" | Joe Turkel | Eddie Davis | D.D. Beauchamp & Mary M. Beauchamp | May 26, 1960 |
| 71 | 34 | "The Elusive Baguette" | Leslie Parrish and Allison Hayes | Alan Crosland Jr. | George F. Slavin | June 2, 1960 |
| 72 | 35 | "The Big Gamble" | Arch Johnson and Morgan Woodward | Franklin Adreon | Michael Fessier | June 16, 1960 |
| 73 | 36 | "Blood on the Money" | Walter Coy and Len Lesser | Alan Crosland Jr. | Mikhail Rykoff | June 23, 1960 |
| 74 | 37 | "Barbary Castle" | Gloria Talbott | Alan Crosland Jr. | Don Brinkley | July 1, 1960 |

=== Season 3 (1960–1961) ===
| No. overall | No. in season | Title | Guest star(s) | Directed by | Written by | Original release date |
|---|---|---|---|---|---|---|
| 75 | 1 | "Debt of Honor" | Edgar Buchanan | Norman Foster | Barney Slater | September 29, 1960 |
| 76 | 2 | "Law of the Land" | Barbara Lawrence and Leo Gordon | Herman Hoffman | Andy White | October 6, 1960 |
| 77 | 3 | "Bat Trap" | Lon Chaney Jr. | Allen H. Miner | John Tucker Battle | October 13, 1960 |
| 78 | 4 | "The Rage of Princess Ann" | TBA | Eddie Davis | Ellis Kadison | October 20, 1960 |
| 79 | 5 | "The Hunter" | John Vivyan | Eddie Davis | Joseph Stone & Paul King | October 27, 1960 |
| 80 | 6 | "Murder Can Be Dangerous" | Allison Hayes | Herman Hoffman | Mikhail Rykoff | November 3, 1960 |
| 81 | 7 | "High Card Loses" | Joan O'Brien | Alan Crosland Jr. | Gene Levitt | November 10, 1960 |
| 82 | 8 | "Dakota Showdown" | James Best and James Seay | Earl Bellamy | Don Brinkley | November 17, 1960 |
| 83 | 9 | "The Last of the Night Raiders" | TBA | Jerry Hopper | Richard Collins | November 24, 1960 |
| 84 | 10 | "Last Stop to Austin" | TBA | Eddie Davis | Teddi Sherman | December 1, 1960 |
| 85 | 11 | "A Time to Die" | TBA | Lew Landers | Frank Grenville | December 15, 1960 |
| 86 | 12 | "Death by Decree" | Paul Richards | Hollingsworth Morse | Don Brinkley | December 22, 1960 |
| 87 | 13 | "The Lady Plays Her Hand" | Wanda Hendrix and William Schallert | Norman Foster | Guy de Vry | December 29, 1960 |
| 88 | 14 | "Tempest at Tioga Pass" | George Macready | Eddie Davis | Andy White | January 5, 1961 |
| 89 | 15 | "The Court Martial of Major Mars" | John Anderson | Elliott Lewis | Joseph Stone & Paul King | January 19, 1961 |
| 90 | 16 | "The Price of Paradise" | Dyan Cannon | Lew Landers | John McGreevey | January 19, 1961 |
| 91 | 17 | "End of the Line" | TBA | Eddie Davis | Lee Karson | January 26, 1961 |
| 92 | 18 | "The Prescott Campaign" | John Dehner | Elliott Lewis | Ellis Kadison | February 2, 1961 |
| 93 | 19 | "Bullwhacker's Bounty" | TBA | Eddie Davis | Don Brinkley | February 16, 1961 |
| 94 | 20 | "A Lesson in Violence" | TBA | Franklin Adreon | Frank Grenville | February 23, 1961 |
| 95 | 21 | "Run for Your Money" | Gerald Mohr | Eddie Davis | John McGreevey | March 2, 1961 |
| 96 | 22 | "Terror on the Trinity" | William Conrad and Lisa Lu | Elliott Lewis | Andy White | March 9, 1961 |
| 97 | 23 | "Episode in Eden" | TBA | Eddie Davis | Ellis Kadison | March 16, 1961 |
| 98 | 24 | "The Good and the Bad" | Jeanette Nolan and Grace Lee Whitney | William Conrad | Ellis Kadison | March 23, 1961 |
| 99 | 25 | "No Amnesty for Death" | DeForest Kelley and R.G. Armstrong | Elliott Lewis | Andy White | March 30, 1961 |
| 100 | 26 | "Ledger of Guilt" | TBA | William Conrad | Frank Grenville | April 6, 1961 |
| 101 | 27 | "Meeting at Mimbres" | TBA | Elliott Lewis | Ron Bishop | April 13, 1961 |
| 102 | 28 | "Dagger Dance" | TBA | Eddie Davis | Don Brinkley | April 20, 1961 |
| 103 | 29 | "The Fourth Man" | George Kennedy | Alvin Ganzer | Mikhail Rykoff | April 27, 1961 |
| 104 | 30 | "Dead Man's Claim" | Stefanie Powers | Lew Landers | George F. Slavin | May 4, 1961 |
| 105 | 31 | "The Marble Slab" | Marvin Miller | Allen H. Miner | Glenhall Taylor & Paul Franklin | May 11, 1961 |
| 106 | 32 | "Farmer with a Badge" | John Agar | Allen H. Miner | Alan Woods & Monroe Manning | May 18, 1961 |
| 107 | 33 | "The Fatal Garment" | Ron Hayes | Hollingsworth Morse | S.H. Barnett & Fran van Hartesveldt | May 25, 1961 |
| 108 | 34 | "Jeopardy at Jackson Hole" | TBA | Franklin Adreon | Guy de Vry | June 1, 1961 |
