= Dorothy Bromiley =

British actress (1930–2024)

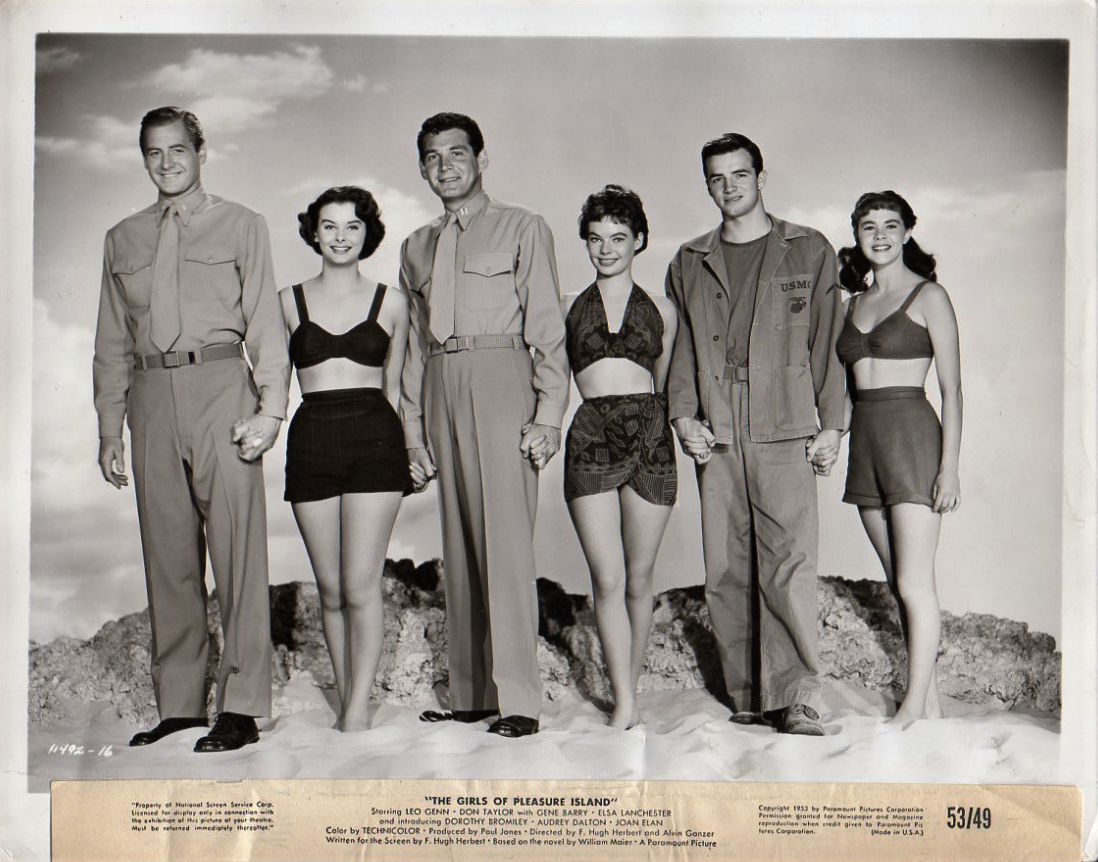
- 1953 promotional photo for the film The Girls of Pleasure Island. Left to right: Don Taylor, Audrey Dalton, Gene Barry, Joan Elan, Peter Baldwin, and Dorothy Bromiley
- Born: 18 September 1930; Manchester, England
- Died: 3 May 2024 (aged 93); England
- Education: Royal Central School of Speech and Drama
- Occupation: Actress
- Years active: 1953–1977
- Spouse: Joseph Losey (m. 1956; div. 1963)
- Partner: Brian Phelan (1963–2024)
- Children: 2

Dorothy Bromiley Phelan (18 September 1930 – 3 May 2024) was a British film, stage and television actress. In later life, she became an authority and writer on historic domestic needlework.

== Early life and education ==
Bromiley was born in Manchester, Lancashire, England, on 18 September 1930. She was the only child of Frank Bromiley and Ada Winifred (née Thornton).

Bromiley attended the Royal Central School of Speech and Drama.

== Career ==
Bromiley played a role in a Hollywood film before returning to the U.K. where, in 1954, she started work as assistant stage manager at the Central Library Theatre, Manchester; followed by a West End stage role in The Wooden Dish directed by the exiled American film and theatre director Joseph Losey. He became Bromiley's husband in 1956, and the two remained married until 1963. They had a son by this relationship, the actor Joshua Losey.

=== Film ===
Bromiley successfully auditioned for the role of Gloria in the Hollywood film The Girls of Pleasure Island (Paramount, 1952). Her major roles in several British films include sixth former Paulette at Angel Hill Grammar School (aged 26 at the time) in It's Great to Be Young (1956) in which Bromiley's singing voice for the Paddy Roberts/ Lester Powell Ray Martin song "You are My First Love" was dubbed by Edna Savage (and by Ruby Murray in the pre-credits sequence), Rose in A Touch Of The Sun (1956) co-starring with Frankie Howerd, Sarah in Zoo Baby (1957) with Angela Baddeley, Small Hotel (1957), Angela in The Criminal (1960) and a minor role in The Servant (1963), the latter two directed by Losey.

=== Television ===
Bromiley made her television drama debut as Pauline Kirby in "The Lady Asks For Help" (1956) an episode of Television Playhouse produced by Towers of London for ITV. This was followed by the role of Ann Fleming in "Heaven and Earth" (1957) part of the Douglas Fairbanks Presents series for ATV. Directed by Peter Brook, it also starred Paul Scofield and Richard Johnson, and was set on board a plane that develops engine trouble. Bromiley also had roles in such popular television series as The Adventures of Robin Hood (1956) as Lady Rowena ("Hubert" episode), Armchair Theatre (1957), Play of the Week ("Arsenic and Old Lace") (1958), Saturday Playhouse ("The Shop at Sly Corner") (1960), Z-Cars (1964), The Power Game (1966) and No Hiding Place (1965, 1966), and the television play Jemima and Johnny (1966). Her last television drama role was as Sarah Malory in Fathers and Families (BBC Television, 1977) directed by Christopher Morahan.

=== Later career ===
Bromiley taught at the London Academy of Music and Dramatic Art (LAMDA) between 1966 and 1972 and left to create The Common Stock Theatre Company, staging socially relevant theatre in colleges and non-traditional halls.

== Personal life and death ==
Once retired from acting, Bromiley lived in Dorset, and developed an interest in 16th and 17th-century amateur domestic needlework, writing on the subject, and curating two major exhibitions.

Bromiley was married to American film and theatre director Joseph Losey from 1956 until 1963. She was later the partner of Dublin-born actor and screenwriter Brian Phelan from 1963 until her death. Together they had a daughter, Kate. Bromiley died on 3 May 2024, at the age of 93. Phelan died five days after Bromiley, on 8 May.

== Works ==
- The Point of the Needle: Five Centuries of Samplers and Embroideries, an Exhibition of Needlework at the Dorset County Museum. (ISBN 1-874336-97-0)
- The Goodhart Samplers (www.needleprint.com ISBN 978-0-9552086-2-1) with Eva Lotta Hansson and Jacqueline Holdsworth, 2008
