= Joan Elan =

English actress (1928–1981)

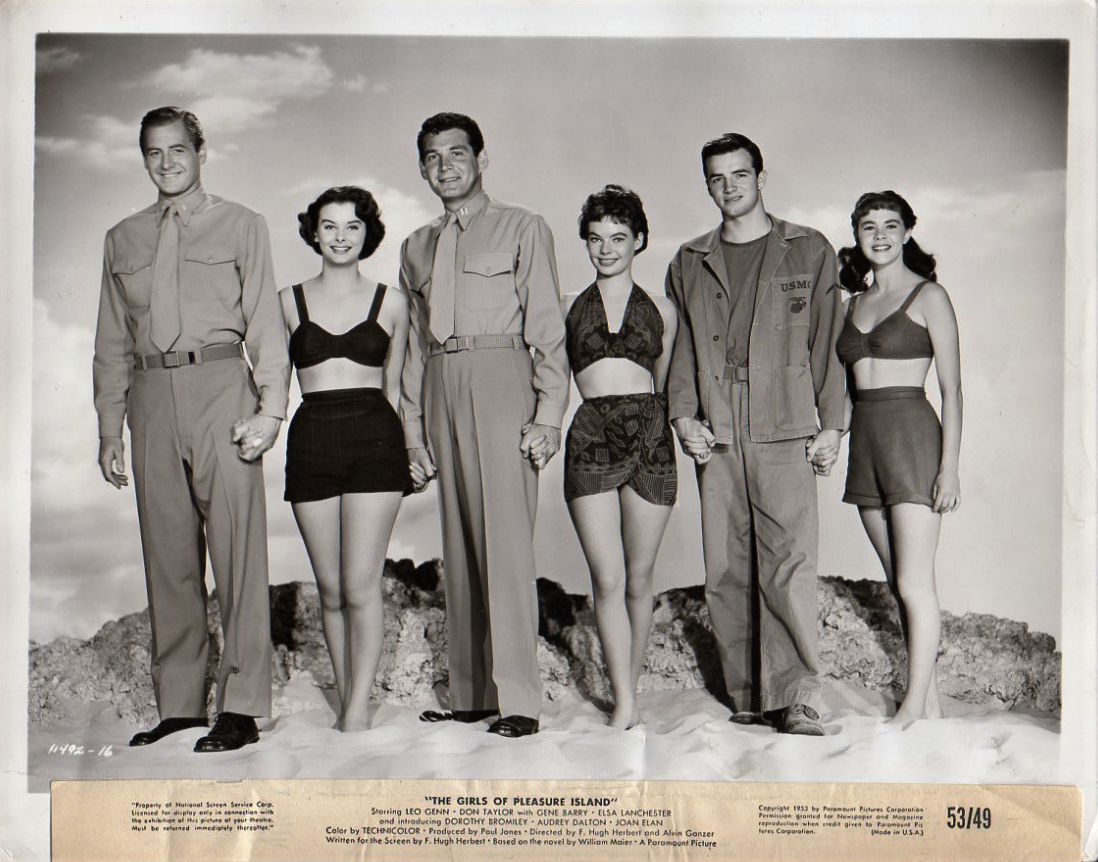
- Elan (center) in The Girls of Pleasure Island (1953)
- Born: Joan Georgina Bingham-Newland; July 24, 1928; Colombo, British Ceylon
- Died: January 7, 1981 (aged 52); New York City, New York, U.S.
- Occupation: Actress
- Years active: 1951–1962
- Spouse: Harry F. "Bud" Nye (1967–1981)
- Parent(s): Richard C. Bingham-Newland, Georgina Low

Joan Elan (July 24, 1928 – January 7, 1981) was an English actress, whose film, stage, and television career occurred mainly in the United States. She is best remembered today for her appearances on television.

== Early life ==
She was born Joan Georgina Bingham-Newland in Colombo, in what was then British Ceylon (modern Sri Lanka). She was the youngest of three children for parents Richard C. Bingham-Newland and Georgina Low. Her father owned a tea plantation near Colombo, where young Joan spent her early years. When her father retired from the tea business the family returned permanently to England. Joan attended school at both Heron's Ghyll and Horsham in Sussex. She later described to an American interviewer hearing the noise of buzz bombs overhead while at school during World War II.

== UK career ==
Following the lead of her older sister, who performed under the stage name Sally Newland, Joan attended the Webber Douglas Academy of Dramatic Art in London. It was here she took on her own stage name, but friends and family continued to know her as Puck, a nickname bestowed for her elfin face and impish ways. She performed with stock companies in England, in Summer Day's Dream and as the lead in a London production of Junior Miss when she was seventeen. She also had an uncredited role in the 1951 Nettleton Studios film Hell Is Sold Out, which led to talent scouts from Paramount "discovering" her.

Writer-director F. Hugh Herbert had adapted William Maier's 1949 novel Pleasure Island for the screen, and was looking for three authentic English lasses to play the ingenue roles. He gave the approval for hiring Joan Elan and two other actresses, Audrey Dalton and Dorothy Bromiley, and escorted all three via BOAC from London to New York City on March 19, 1952.

== First years in America ==
Paramount launched a full publicity campaign around the three girls, with photo-ops, including the cover of Life magazine. Press releases acknowledged that Joan was the eldest of the trio, but shaved two years off her real age and falsely claimed none of the actresses had professional experience, though Pacific Stars & Stripes soon reported Joan's prior work. One interviewer described Joan as having "blue-green, slanted eyes" and "brown hair... close cropped like a boy's", while another reviewer said she "looks like a sophisticated pixie". A film editor at Paramount was less impressed, praising actresses Dalton and Bromiley, while saying "...but the third one is hard to dig".

For the film's world premiere on March 20, 1953, Joan Elan and other stars were flown to Seoul, South Korea, where the showing was jointly sponsored by the Department of Defense and the USO. Joan Elan and co-stars Audrey Dalton and Don Taylor, along with other Paramount contract players, put on a skit for the troops.

Despite its title, reviewers found The Girls of Pleasure Island to be innocent family fare. Reviews for Joan's work were more focused on the character than the performance, but she drew no negative comments. The picture was successful, but not overwhelmingly so, especially considering the long press campaign. It did not lead immediately into other film roles for Joan; columnists noted the contrast with her co-star Audrey Dalton. Joan herself may have had some reservations about continuing to work in America, for she enrolled as a voter for the first time in late 1953 at her parents residence at Tilford in Surrey, a status she would maintain for the next few years.

On September 15, 1955, she was one of eight women who tested for the role of Princess Aouda in Around the World in 80 Days (1956).

== Television debut ==
Her Paramount contract had been renewed in 1953, but wasn't continued any further. By early 1954 she had turned to television, work that at the time was less prestigious than film. She had leading roles in four small-screen productions that year, three of them for anthology series. One of these productions was an ambitious two hour version of Great Expectations, for which Joan played Estella.

As Joan Elan matured into her late twenties, her appearance suggested to some casting directors that she might play "exotic" ethnic types. During 1955 she played Eurasian, Chinese, and Eastern European characters on television, and surprisingly, an English lady. She also had a small role in her third film, MGM's colorful but leaden Restoration era swashbuckler, The King's Thief, where she played a shy Quaker girl.

== Broadway stage ==
In late October 1955 she opened in Boston for the original production of The Lark. She played the young queen in the adaptation of Jean Anouilh's 1952 French language two-act play about Joan of Arc. After its trial run, the show moved to Broadway in November 1955. Nominated for five Tony Awards (with a win for Julie Harris), the show lasted for 229 performances, a six-month run that later led one commentater to describe Joan Elan as a "New York actress". Her stage success also raised her visibility in Hollywood, leading to her most prolific performing years. When the touring company was formed for off Broadway, Joan's part was taken up by Barbara Stanton, who also performed the role on the Hallmark Hall of Fame television adaptation in February 1957.

== Later career ==
Joan Elan spent the remainder of 1956 making seven one-hour features for television's Matinee Theater. This color anthology series was shown by NBC in mid-afternoon. According to John Conte, who acted as host and co-starred in some of the features, the rationale for the broadcast time was so that RCA (parent company of NBC) showrooms would have a color TV program to display for their customers. Joan Elan's English accent lent an air of authenticity to the show, which often adapted literary works in the public domain to reduce costs.

Elan would make four more of these features for Matinee Theater during the next two years. One 1957 program had her playing the title role in Jane Eyre alongside her drama school classmate Patrick Macnee. This was easily the most widely viewed of Joan's performances, though the one-hour running time necessitated drastic cuts in the storyline. It was a staple of later broadcast for many years on US television, and is still available on YouTube today.

Her experience in filmed television led to her obtaining more parts in popular episodic shows, such as Perry Mason, Maverick, 77 Sunset Strip, Rawhide, and Bat Masterson. However, the English accent that she was so careful to maintain, being her most marketable feature, also made her too distinctive for repeat usage during the same season on these shows. She could handle both comic and dramatic roles, but had no demonstrable skills in singing or dancing. Coupled with her natural reserve, this meant she had no opportunities for early television's many variety shows, nor did she ever seem to do any talk shows. Another drawback for her television career, in which Westerns would play so big a part, was her fear of horses.

Her last film role, Darby's Rangers (1958), was one of her most popular turns, playing a light romantic part opposite Stuart Whitman. In spite of this well-liked movie and her many television roles during 1957–1960, Joan Elan's career halted abruptly with the coming of 1961. She had no performing work at all that year. She had one last performance in 1962, on Have Gun – Will Travel, playing opposite Richard Boone.

== Personal life ==
After her last television role in 1962, Elan stopped performing altogether. She and Harry F. "Bud" Nye, a teleplay writer and occasional author, took out a marriage license in Manhattan in late 1966 but were not married until the next year. There was no issue from the marriage, which was her first and his second. Elan died on January 7, 1981, in New York City, and was interred in Island Cemetery, Newport, Rhode Island as "Joan Elan Nye". Her headstone carries a birthdate of 1930, perhaps a legacy of those two years Paramount shaved off her age decades before.

== Filmography ==
List of acting performances in British and American films
Year	Title	Role	Notes
1951	Hell Is Sold Out	Nurse	Her only British film role, albeit uncredited
1953	The Girls of Pleasure Island	Violet Halyard	
1955	The King's Thief	Charity Fell	
1958	Darby's Rangers	Wendy Hollister	

List of acting performances on American television
Year	Series	Episode	Role	Notes
1954	The Lone Wolf	The Sid Story	Jeanne	
1954	Robert Montgomery Presents	Great Expectations	Estella Havisham	Two hour-long parts for this ambitious TV production
1954	Lux Video Theater	To Each His Own	Ida Lorimer	
1954	Robert Montgomery Presents	End of a Mission		Joan co-starred with Leslie Nielsen
1955	Four Star Playhouse	The Returning	Laura	Joan played a Eurasian teacher in a Tokyo school opposite Dick Powell
1955	TV Reader's Digest	Incident on the China Coast	Rose	Joan was cast as a Chinese air hostess
1955	Schlitz Playhouse	Visa for X	Mary Mercer	
1955	Front Row Center	The Barretts of Wimpole Street	Henrietta Barrett	
1955	Crusader	The Boxing Match	Lisa	Joan and co-star Charles Bronson were cast as Eastern Europeans
1956	Turning Point	Unfair Game	Sylvia Rouse	Triangle in the Australian Outback
1956	Matinee Theater	There's Always Juliet		Joan's co-star for this was series host John Conte
1956	Matinee Theater	The Feast		Joan co-starred with Nora O'Mahoney in an adaptation of Margaret Kennedy's 1950 novel
1956	Matinee Theater	The Fall of the House of Usher	Madeleine Usher	Edgar Allan Poe's classic story has Joan playing a cataleptic
1956	Matinee Theater	Perfect Alibi		From an A. A. Milne short story, Joan's co-star was Reginald Denny
1956	Matinee Theater	September Tide	Cherry	Daphne Du Maurier story of a love triangle co-starred Donald Murphy and Irene Hervey
1956	Matinee Theater	Pride and Prejudice		Jane Austen's novel, adapted by Helen Hanff.
1956	Matinee Theater	The Egotist	Clara Middleton	
1957	Climax!	Deadly Climate		
1957	Matinee Theater	The Man in Half-Moon Street		John Baragrey was Joan's co-star; filmed in 1956 but broadcast in January 1957
1957	Matinee Theater	Mr. Pim Passes By	Dinah	
1957	Matinee Theater	Jane Eyre	Jane Eyre	Joan had the title role opposite Patrick Macnee
1958	Matinee Theater	The Thunderbolt		Joan had a secondary lead in this which again featured Patrick Macnee
1958	The Adventures of McGraw	Vivian	Vivian Morrow	Joan played an amnesia victim helped by series star Frank Lovejoy
1958	Perry Mason	The Case of the Terrified Typist	Mrs. Lumis	Joan played a South African woman in Los Angeles
1958	The Silent Service	The Pargo's Lucky Seventh	Carol – Missionary's Daughter	
1958	Maverick	The Belcastle Brand	Lady Ellen Belcastle	
1959	77 Sunset Strip	The Secret of Adam Cain	Jane Neddleton	Credits have character as "Lois Neddleton" but on screen she introduces herself as "Jane"
1959	Bat Masterson	Man of Action	Deborah Jenkins	
1960	Maverick	Iron Hand	Ursula Innescourt	
1960	One Step Beyond	The Mask	Nurse	
1960	Rawhide	Incident in the Garden of Eden	Nancy	
1960	Stagecoach West	By the Deep Six	Molly Moriarty	Joan's character was Boston Irish with a very posh lilt
1962	Have Gun – Will Travel	The Hunt	Vanessa Stuart	
