= The King's Thief =

1955 adventure film by Robert Z. Leonard

- Australian film poster
- Directed by: Robert Z. Leonard; Hugo Fregonese (uncredited)
- Written by: Christopher Knopf
- Based on: story by Robert Hardy Andrews
- Produced by: Edwin H. Knopf
- Starring: Ann Blyth; Edmund Purdom; David Niven; George Sanders; Roger Moore
- Cinematography: Robert H. Planck
- Edited by: John McSweeney, Jr.
- Music by: Miklós Rózsa
- Distributed by: Metro-Goldwyn-Mayer
- Release date: August 5, 1955
- Running time: 78 mins.
- Country: United States
- Language: English
- Budget: $1,577,000
- Box office: $1,549,000

The King's Thief is a 1955 CinemaScope historical adventure film directed by Robert Z. Leonard, who replaced Hugo Fregonese during filming. Released on August 5, 1955, the film takes place in London at the time of Charles II and stars Ann Blyth, Edmund Purdom, David Niven, George Sanders and Roger Moore.

== Plot ==
James (Niven), the Duke of Brampton and the richest man in England, is so trusted by King Charles II (Sanders), he is able to have two of the King's loyal friends executed for treason. The second is the father of Lady Mary (Blyth). She travels from France to London to seek justice. While there, she meets Michael Dermott (Purdom), a soldier who fought to restore Charles to the throne.

He and many others were never paid for their services, unbeknownst to the King. He therefore turned highwayman. He and his comrades rob the Duke and come into possession of the Duke's notebook. In it are listed twelve rich and powerful people, as well as details of their possessions. Two names are crossed out; it does not take long for Michael to realize that the other ten are in peril for their lives. Michael first tries to blackmail the Duke, but without much success. A fence named Simon betrays his hiding place. Michael and his comrade Jack (Moore) escape from the Duke's soldiers, though Michael is wounded in the shoulder. Adventure abounds as the Duke tries to retrieve his property before it can be used against him.

== Cast ==
- Ann Blyth as Lady Mary
- Edmund Purdom as Michael Dermott
- David Niven as James - Duke of Brampton
- George Sanders as Charles II
- Roger Moore as Jack
- John Dehner as Captain Herrick
- Sean McClory as Sheldon
- Tudor Owen as Simon
- Melville Cooper ... Henry Wynch
- Alan Mowbray ... Sir Gilbert Talbot
- Rhys Williams ... Turnkey
- Joan Elan ... Charity Fell
- Charles Davis ... Apothecary
- Ashley Cowan ... Skene
- Ian Wolfe ... Fell
- Paul Cavanagh ... Sir Edward Scott
- Lillian Kemble-Cooper ... Mrs. Fell
- Isobel Elsom ... Mrs. Bennett
- Milton Parsons ... Adam Urich
- Jacob Hall ... Lord Layton
- Queenie Leonard ... Apothecary's Wife
- Owen McGiveney ... Hoskins
- Robert Dix ... Husky
- Michael Dugan ... Husky
- James Logan ... Guard
- Jimmy Aubrey ... Little Man (uncredited)
- Leonard Carey ... Servant (uncredited)
- Leslie Denison ... Beadle (voice) (uncredited)
- Ronald Green ... Hired Swordsman (uncredited)
- Peter Hansen ... Isaac Newton (uncredited)
- Ramsay Hill ... Lord (uncredited)
- Charles Keane ... Guard (uncredited)
- Keith McConnell ... Usher (uncredited)
- John Monaghan ... Shaddy (uncredited)
- Matt Moore ... Gentleman (uncredited)
- Clive Morgan ... Captain of Guards (uncredited)
- Vesey O'Davoren ... Courier (uncredited)
- Gordon Richards ... Courier (uncredited)
- Lewis L. Russell ... Gentleman (uncredited)
- Gilchrist Stuart ... Clerk (uncredited)
- Trevor Ward ... Perspiring Man (uncredited)
- Trude Wyler ... Celestine (uncredited)

== Production notes ==
MGM had a big hit at the box office with Ivanhoe (1952), a swashbuckling adventure film, leading to them making a cycle of such films. In October 1952 they announced they would make The King's Thief based on an original story by Robert Hardy Andrews about an Irish patriot during the reign of Charles II (likely based on Thomas Blood). Edwin Knopf was to produce and Knopf's son Christopher wrote the script. It was originally envisioned as a vehicle for Stewart Granger, who had recently made a swashbuckler for the studio, The Prisoner of Zenda 1952).

MGM then announced Robert Taylor would play the lead. Then by April 1953 Granger was back as star. Eventually the lead was given to Edmund Purdom who MGM were building into a star at the time.

In February 1954 MGM announced the film would be part of its schedule for the following year and would be directed by Gottfried Reinhardt.

The female lead went to Ann Blyth. Michael Wilding was going to play the villain before being replaced by David Niven in early December. It was a rare villain part for Niven.

Filming started 15 December 1954 under the direction of Hugo Fregonese. By early January, Fregonese had been replaced by MGM veteran Robert Z. Leonard who had been in semi-retirement since completing Her Twelve Men (1954) about twelve months previously. The Los Angeles Times reported that Fregonese and Edward Knopf "did not see eye to eye during production."

The cast included wrestler Jacob Hall who played Lord Layton who fought Edmund Purdom.

== Reception ==
=== Box Office ===
According to MGM records the film earned only $478,000 in the US and Canada and $1,071,000 elsewhere, resulting in a loss to the studio of $707,000.

=== Critical ===
The Los Angeles Times called it "glittering and excellently made."

== See also ==
- List of American films of 1955
