= Confession (1955 film) =

British film by Ken Hughes

- Theatrical release poster
- Directed by: Ken Hughes
- Written by: Ken Hughes
- Based on: Confession by Don Martin
- Produced by: Alec C. Snowden
- Starring: Sydney Chaplin; Audrey Dalton; John Bentley; Peter Hammond
- Cinematography: Phil Grindrod
- Edited by: Geoffrey Muller
- Music by: Richard Taylor
- Production company: Merton Park Studios
- Distributed by: Anglo-Amalgamated
- Release dates: June 1955 (UK); 29 January 1956 (US)
- Running time: 90 minutes
- Country: United Kingdom
- Language: English

Confession, released in the United States as The Deadliest Sin, is a 1955 British second feature ('B') drama film directed and written by Ken Hughes and starring Sydney Chaplin, Audrey Dalton and John Bentley.

== Plot ==
A man enters a confessional box in a church and tells the priest: "I have killed a man, Father".

Mike Nelson arrives at a country cottage. He has been in the USA working in the oil business for many years. He is greeted enthusiastically by his sister, Louise, but his elderly father is more reserved. Their childhood friend Alan welcomes Mike. Louise shows Mike to his old room where, alone, he unlocks his suitcase and reveals a secret compartment full of dollar bills and a gun. He hides the suitcase.

At dinner he is surprised to receive a phone call at the family home. Someone has tracked him down.

At the bank he changes a $50 bill. A man approaches him and demands his "cut". They arrange to meet near a railway shunting yard. Mike goes to the meeting with his gun; a scuffle starts when he produces it. Alan is passing, and Mike, who is near to being killed by the other man, tells him to grab the gun. Alan reluctantly shoots the man dead to stop him killing Mike. They leave him and drive off, arguing whether to tell the police. Alan believes it was justifiable self-defence, but Mike says if Alan goes to the police, he will not support Alan's story. The police find the body, and tyre tracks leading from the scene.

Alan is Roman Catholic and decides to confess his crime (shown in the opening scene). As he receives absolution, an unseen assailant shoots him dead. The priest refuses to tell the police what had been confessed, despite them suggesting he may become a target. The police compare the bullets and (wrongly) decide that both victims were killed by the same man. They match the tyre tracks with Alan's car. They establish that Mike's alibi is false, but they cannot work out how he is connected.

The police inspector takes Louise to dinner. He implies that Mike had been in trouble with the American police, and tells her Mike lied about being in a pub with Alan on the night of the murder, but he gets nothing from her. Louise is disturbed and searches Mike's room. Mike catches her, he tells her that Alan murdered the man, and he lied about the pub to protect Alan. Louise is unsure what to think, but asks if Alan killed the man, who killed Alan?

The police start to work out what happened but have no proof. They ask the priest to go about his work as usual, and they will watch him, in case the murderer comes after him, to which he agrees. Meanwhile Mike decides to flee to South Africa.

Louise forces Mike's suitcase and finds both the cash and the gun. Mike confronts her and then confesses what happened both next to the railway and in the church. He says the truth will kill their father.

The police set a trap by telling the family untruthfully that the priest has obtained permission from Rome to make a statement the next morning about Alan's confession. Louise leaves to visit an aunt, in order to keep away from Mike before he goes, but the inspector tells her they are trying to trap her brother and she must stay with the police until Mike is apprehended. She sadly agrees to take part in the trap by taking a rerouted telephone call from Mike, pretending that she is at their aunt's house. Meanwhile, their father has realised that something is wrong and, when Mike tries to leave the house to kill the priest, he confronts Mike. Mike pushes his father out of his wheelchair onto the floor and leaves the house, hearing his father call out 'Murderer!'

Mike heads for the church, but the police are watching. He hides in the organ loft and is about to shoot the priest mid-service when the organ starts playing and throws him off aim. The police rush in, joined by Louise. Mike climbs to the bell tower, firing at the police, but runs out of bullets. The bell starts to ring, he is deafened, and falls to his death.

== Cast ==
- Sydney Chaplin as Mike Nelson
- Audrey Dalton as Louise Nelson
- John Bentley as Inspector Kessler
- Peter Hammond as Alan Poole
- John Welsh as Father Neil
- Jefferson Clifford as Pop Nelson
- Patrick Allen as Corey, the murdered man
- Pat McGrath as Williams
- Robert Raglan as Becklan
- Betty Wolfe as Mrs. Poole, Alan's mother
- Richard Huggett as young priest
- Eddie Stafford as photographer
- Percy Herbert as barman
- Felix Felton as bar customer
- Dorinda Stevens as blonde in bar

== Production ==
The film was made at Merton Park Studios by Anglo-Amalgamated. Along with Little Red Monkey, released the same year, the film was an international hit and led to the company producing films with a higher production quality than they had previously, often importing American stars to give the films more international appeal.

== Reception ==
The Monthly Film Bulletin wrote: "This is an average melodrama, technically quite competent, but the situation is scarcely developed and little depth is given to any of the characters. The slow pace makes for a slackening of tension, and the contrived story loses its grip some time before the over-predictable dénouement."

Kine Weekly wrote: "Exciting and unusual crime melodrama ... Its box-office Anglo-American cast and experienced director make the most of the provocative and gripping plot, and the by-play is both touching and apposite. At once thoughtful and hair-raising, it should click with all classes."
