= The Girls of Pleasure Island =

1953 film

- Theatrical release poster by Pete Hawley
- Directed by: Alvin Ganzer; F. Hugh Herbert
- Written by: F. Hugh Herbert (screenplay); Based on a novel by William Maier
- Produced by: Paul Jones
- Starring: Don Taylor; Leo Genn; Elsa Lanchester; Philip Ober
- Cinematography: Daniel L. Fapp; W. Howard Greene
- Edited by: Ellsworth Hoagland
- Music by: Lyn Murray
- Distributed by: Paramount Pictures
- Release date: April 1, 1953
- Running time: 95 minutes
- Country: United States
- Language: English

The Girls of Pleasure Island is a 1953 Technicolor comedy film directed by Alvin Ganzer and F. Hugh Herbert. The screenplay by F. Hugh Herbert is based on the novel Pleasure Island by former Marine William Maier. The original music score is composed by Lyn Murray.

== Plot ==
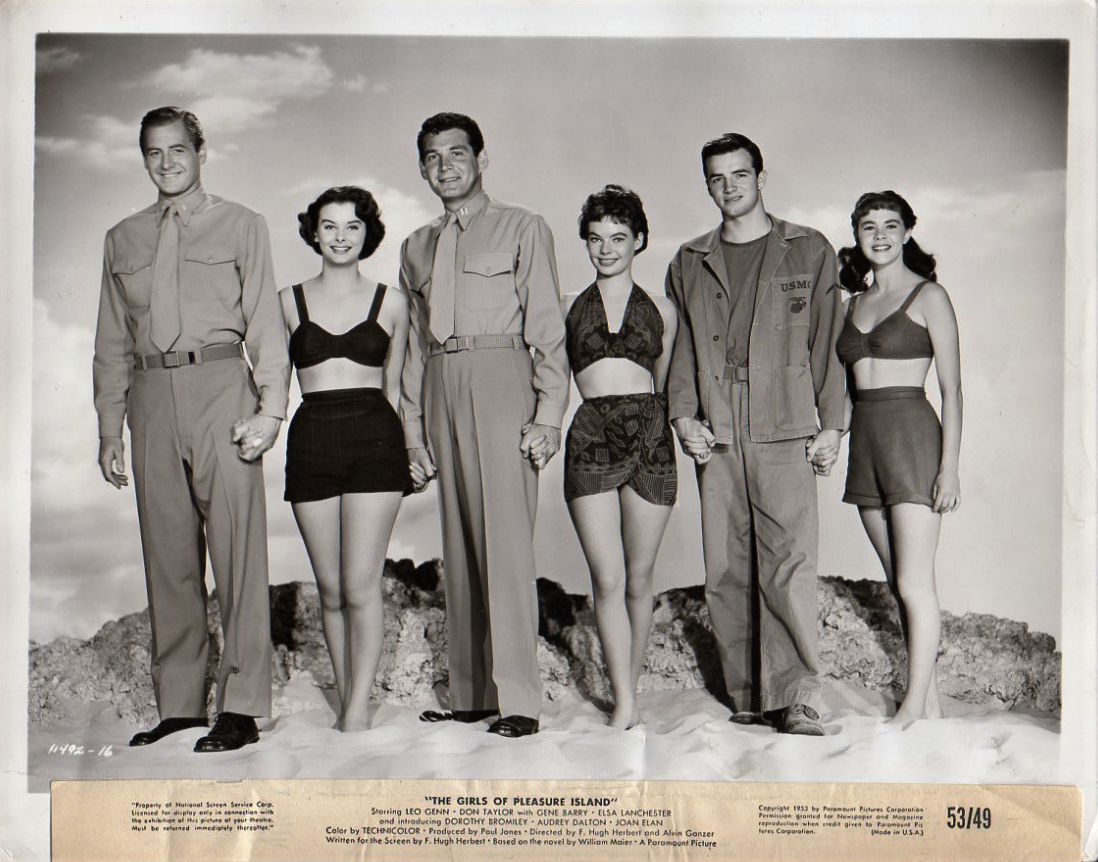
Left to right: Don Taylor, Audrey Dalton, Gene Barry, Joan Elan, Peter Baldwin, Dorothy Bromiley

In 1945, Roger Halyard is a stiff-upper-lipped British gentleman who lives on a South Pacific island with his three nubile, naive daughters, Violet, Hester and Gloria. Hoping to shelter the girls from the lascivious advances of the opposite sex, Halyard is thwarted when 1,500 Marines arrive to transform the island into an aircraft landing base. Despite the best efforts of Halyard, his housekeeper Thelma, and Marine Colonel Reade, romance blossoms between the three girls and a trio of handsome leathernecks.

== Cast ==
- Don Taylor - Lieutenant Gilmartin
- Leo Genn - Roger Halyard
- Elsa Lanchester - Thelma
- Philip Ober - Colonel Reade
- Joan Elan - Violet Halyard
- Audrey Dalton - Hester Halyard
- Dorothy Bromiley - Gloria Halyard
- Peter Baldwin - Private Henry Smith
- Gene Barry - Captain Beaton
- Arthur Gould-Porter - Reverend Bates
- Barry Bernard - Wilkinson

== Movie rights and storyline revisions ==
William Maier was a USMC officer who served in the South Pacific during World War II, rising to the rank of Major by 1945. His book was a mixed genre effort, often pastoral in tone, and largely dealt with the protagonist's efforts to prevent disruption to the indigenous way of life on the half of the island he owned. Louella Parsons revealed in her syndicated newspaper column that the movie rights to the book had been purchased by Harry Cohn for Columbia Studios three months before its publication.

Cohn's intent was to film the picture on Jamaica, using the working title of Virgin Island. The producer was to be S. Sylvan Simon, with Roland Kibbee writing the screenplay. However, nothing came of the venture, and the movie rights were later picked up by Paramount, with F. Hugh Herbert assigned to write and direct the film.

Herbert's screenplay removed the fictional island from Melanesia to Polynesia, made the central character Roger Halyard the British Administrator of the island instead of a private landowner, and dispensed entirely with the indigenous population and most of the European colonists. The three daughters, who had independent lifestyles and seldom interacted in the book, were rendered as less mature and closer knit in the screenplay, which also invented the character of Thelma the housekeeper. The book's chief villain, Colonel Reade, was whitewashed from a boozy lecher to a sympathetic commander, while the youngest daughter was renamed from Elsie to Gloria and made two years younger in the movie.

== Production ==
Based on a 1949 novel Pleasure Island that was the working title, Paramount acquired the property in 1951 from Columbia Pictures who did not produce it.

At times, Robert Donat and William Holden were considered for the film.

For the three English daughters, Paramount interviewed 900 aspiring actresses, with nine given screen tests at Pinewood Studios. Joan Elan, Audrey Dalton and Dorothy Bromiley, each of them then attending a different drama school, were chosen.

The three were contracted by Paramount and were given massive publicity including a cover story in LIFE magazine and made tours to promote the film, including "GI Premieres" to troops fighting the Korean War.

The film was made on Paramount's backlot in 1952. During the filming director F. Hugh Herbert became ill and was replaced by assistant director Alvin Ganzer.

Included in the cast playing marines were Earl Holliman, Ross Bagdasarian, Sr., Benny Bartlett, Buck Young and Johnny Downs.
