= Casanova's Big Night =

1954 film by Norman Z. McLeod

- 1954 US Theatrical Poster
- Directed by: Norman Z. McLeod
- Written by: Aubrey Wisberg
- Screenplay by: Edmund Hartmann; Hal Kanter
- Produced by: Paul Jones
- Starring: Bob Hope; Joan Fontaine; Basil Rathbone; John Carradine; Lon Chaney Jr. Raymond Burr
- Cinematography: Lionel Lindon
- Edited by: Ellsworth Hoagland
- Music by: Lyn Murray
- Production company: Paramount Pictures
- Distributed by: Paramount Pictures
- Release date: April 7, 1954
- Running time: 86 minutes
- Country: United States
- Language: English
- Box office: $1.6 million

Casanova's Big Night is a 1954 American comedy film starring Bob Hope and Joan Fontaine, which is a spoof of swashbuckling historical adventure films. It was directed by Norman Z. McLeod.

Hope plays a tailor who impersonates Giacomo Casanova, the great lover. The film also stars Audrey Dalton, Basil Rathbone, Hugh Marlowe, John Carradine, Hope Emerson, Lon Chaney Jr., Raymond Burr, Natalie Schafer, and Vincent Price (in a cameo appearance as the real Casanova).

== Plot ==
Pippo, a tailor, impersonates Casanova to woo the girls, particularly the widow Bruni. Casanova has left town, pursued by creditors who persuade Pippo to impersonate Casanova at the behest of a Genoan family that will pay "Casanova" to test the fidelity of the son's betrothed.

Pippo, the widow Bruni and Casanova's valet Lucio travel to Venice. The Doge of Venice, "a snake with whiskers," to use Pippo's description, intends to use the intended seduction as an excuse to wage war against Genoa. After many humorous adventures, exploiting Pippo's traits of vanity, arrogance and cowardice, the heroine so impresses Pippo with her dignity that he refuses to cooperate in the plot to ruin her character. He is arrested by the Doge and sentenced to death by beheading. A desperate Pippo turns the audience for help, but is shocked when they prefer that he lose his head.

== Cast ==
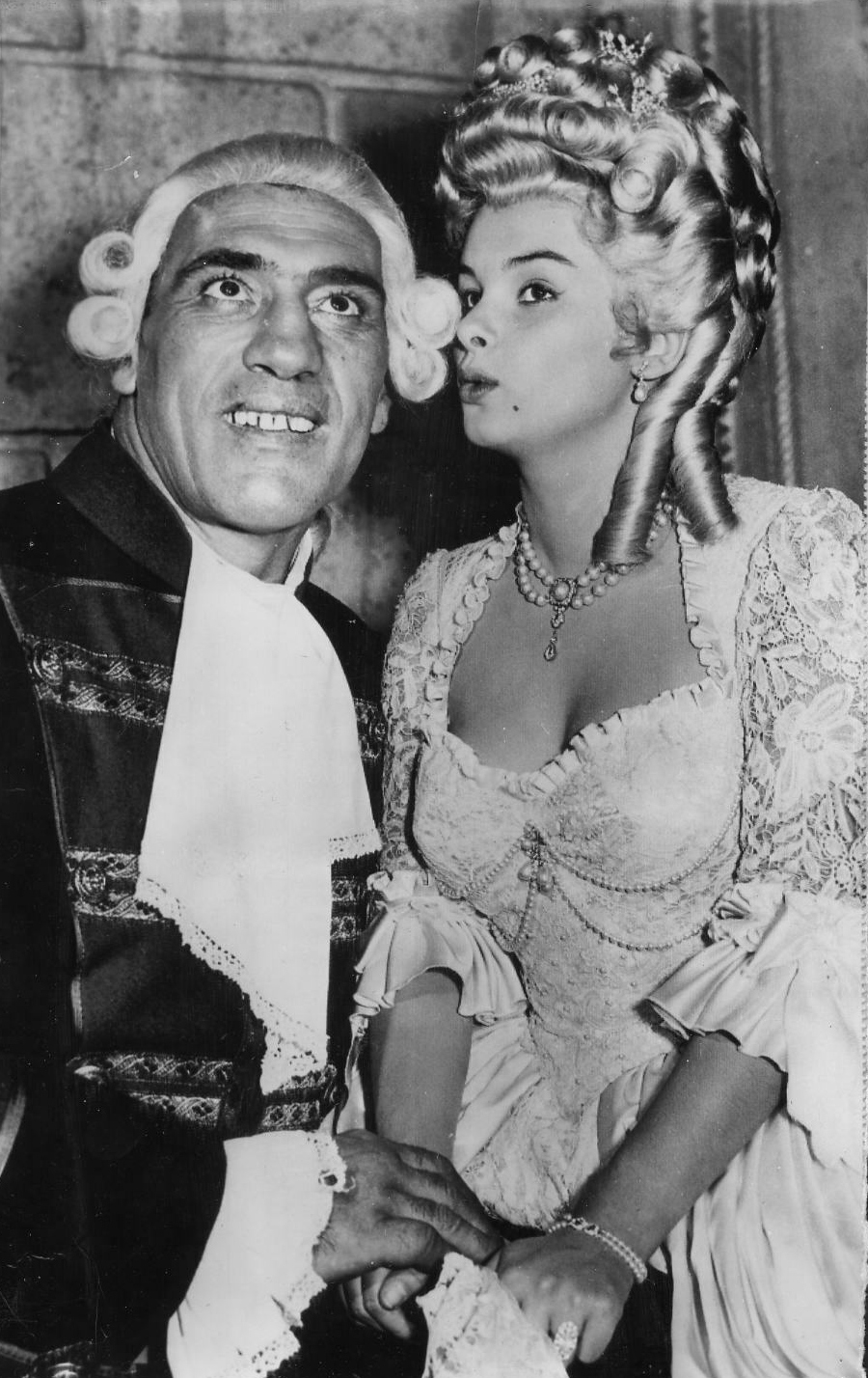
Primo Carnera and Audrey Dalton in the film

- Bob Hope as Pippo Popolino
- Joan Fontaine as Francesca Bruni
- Audrey Dalton as Elena Di Gambetta
- Basil Rathbone as Lucio / Narrator
- Hugh Marlowe as Stefano Di Gambetta
- Arnold Moss as The Doge
- John Carradine as Foressi
- John Hoyt as Maggiorin
- Hope Emerson as Duchess of Castelbello
- Robert Hutton as Raphael, Duc of Castelbello
- Lon Chaney Jr. as Emo the Murderer (as Lon Chaney)
- Raymond Burr as Bragadin
- Frieda Inescort as Signora Di Gambetta
- Primo Carnera as Corfa
- Frank Puglia as Carabaccio
- Paul Cavanagh as Signor Alberto Di Gambetta
- Romo Vincent as Giovanni
- Henry Brandon as Captain Rugello
- Natalie Schafer as Signora Foressi
- Douglas Fowley as Second Prisoner
- Nestor Paiva as Gnocchi
- Lucien Littlefield as First Prisoner
- Vincent Price as Casanova (cameo)

== Production ==
Paramount built a 400 feet-long full-scale imitation of the Grand Canal in Venice together with bridge and 16 buildings for the film.
