= Bat Masterson (TV series) =

American Western television series (1958–1961)

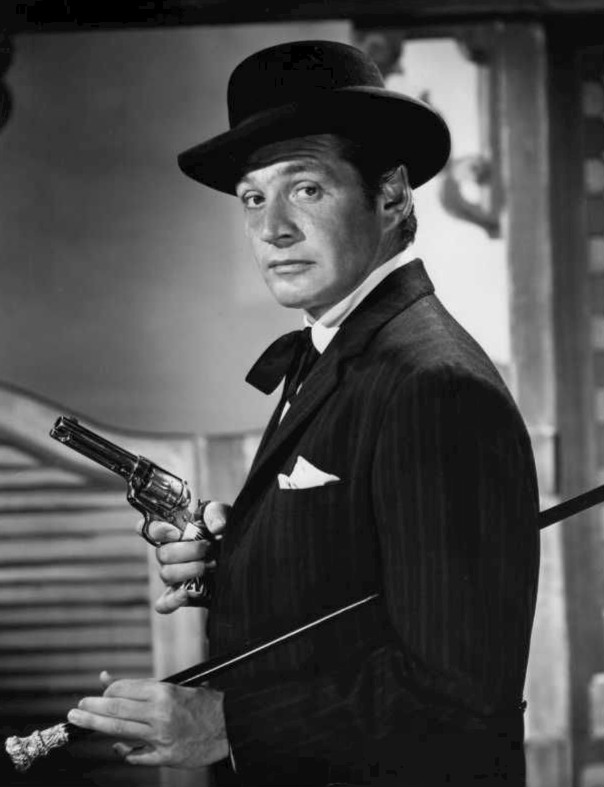
- Gene Barry as Bat Masterson, 1958
- Genre: Western
- Starring: Gene Barry
- Narrated by: Bill Baldwin, Bob LeMond
- Theme music composer: Havens Wray (David D. Rose)
- Ending theme: Bill Lee (Singer)
- Country of origin: United States
- Original language: English
- No. of seasons: 3
- No. of episodes: 108 (list of episodes)

Production
- Producers: Frank Pittman; Andy White; Frederick W. Ziv
- Running time: 30 minutes
- Production companies: Ziv Television Programs; (1958–1960); Ziv-United Artists; (1960–1961); MGM Television

Original release
- Network: NBC
- Release: October 8, 1958 – June 1, 1961

Bat Masterson is an American Western television series which was a fictionalized account of real-life marshal, gambler, and journalist Bat Masterson. The title character was played by Gene Barry, and the half-hour black-and-white series ran on NBC from 1958 to 1961. The show was produced by Ziv Television Productions. "Bat" is a nickname for Masterson's first name Bartholemew, although the fictional Masterson says that his name is William Barkley Masterson.

The series was based on the biography Bat Masterson by Richard O'Connor, as noted in the closing credits.

== Overview ==
The fictionalized Masterson dressed in expensive clothing, including a walking stick with a hidden sword. He preferred to use his cane rather than a gun to get himself out of trouble. He was portrayed as a ladies' man who traveled the West looking for women and adventure. He also came to the aid of innocents wrongly accused of crimes.

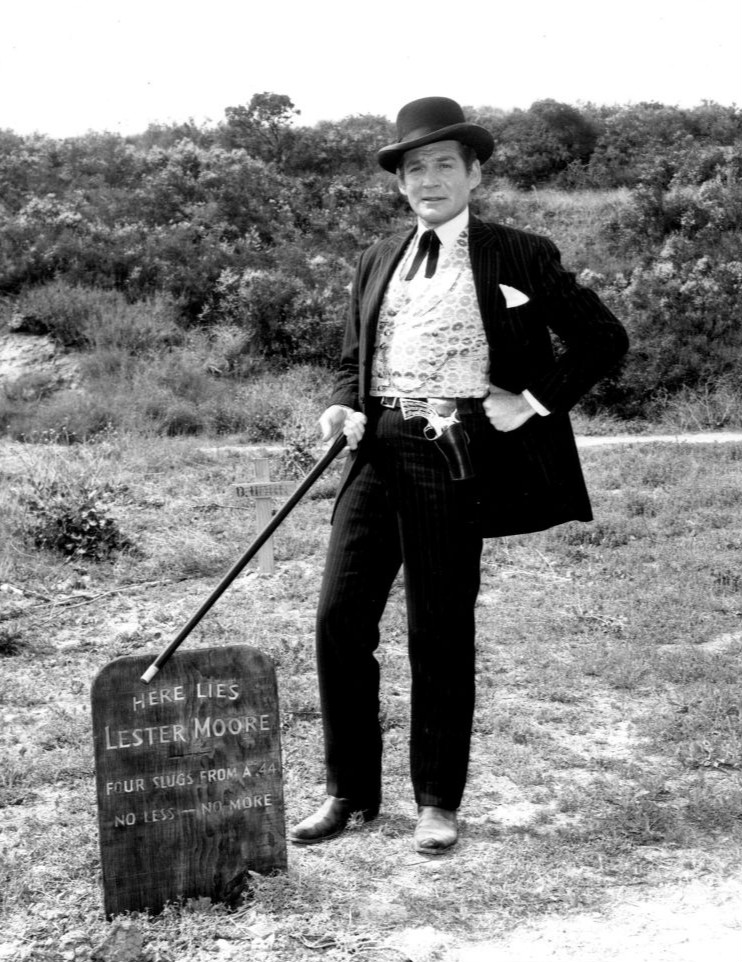
Gene Barry as Bat Masterson (1960)

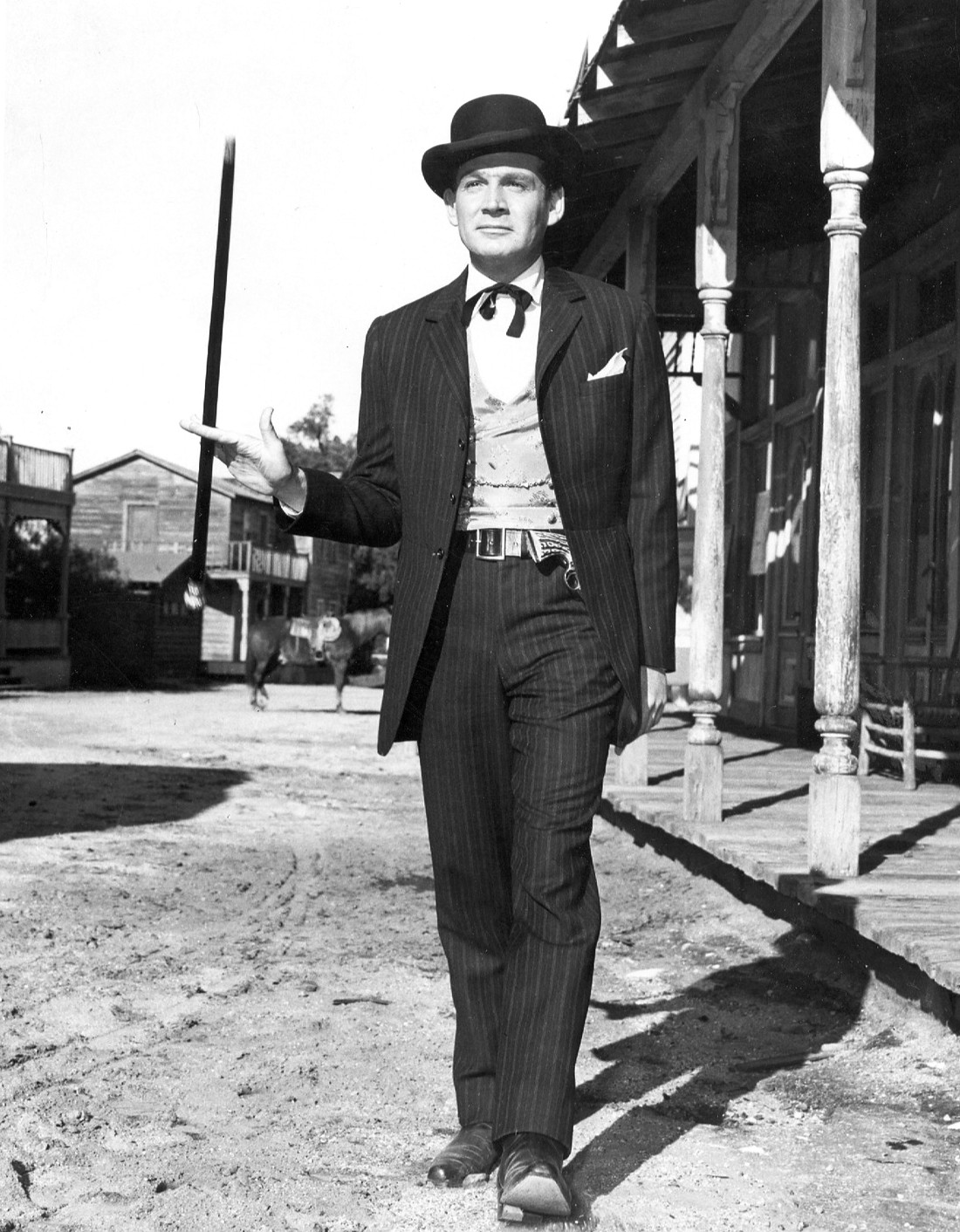
Gene Barry as Bat Masterson (1958)

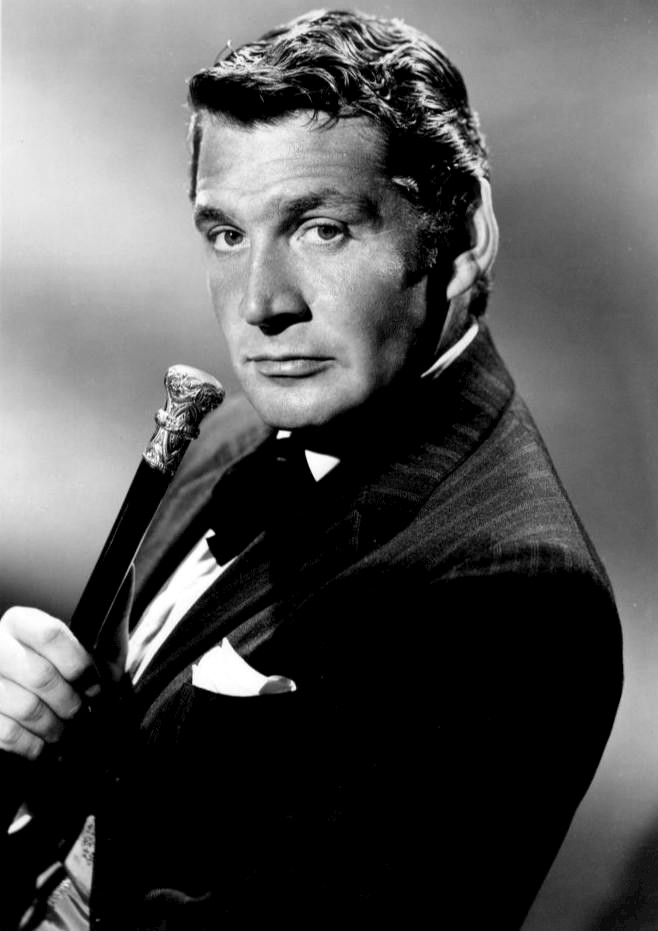
Gene Barry as Bat Masterson (1960)

== Cast ==
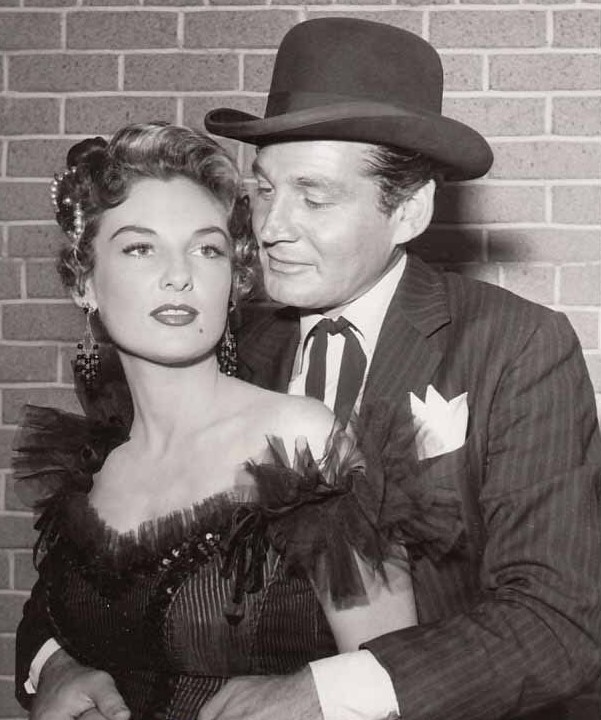
Allison Hayes appeared in 7 episodes (1958)

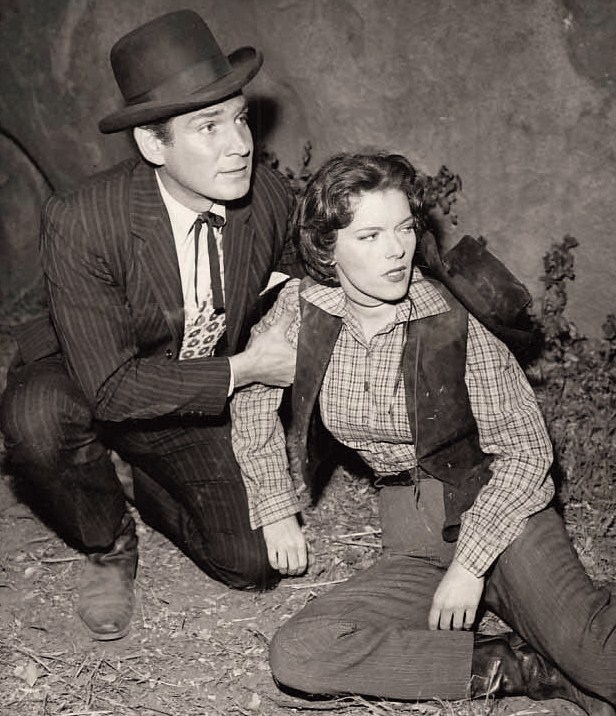
With Jacqueline Scott in "The Black Pearls"

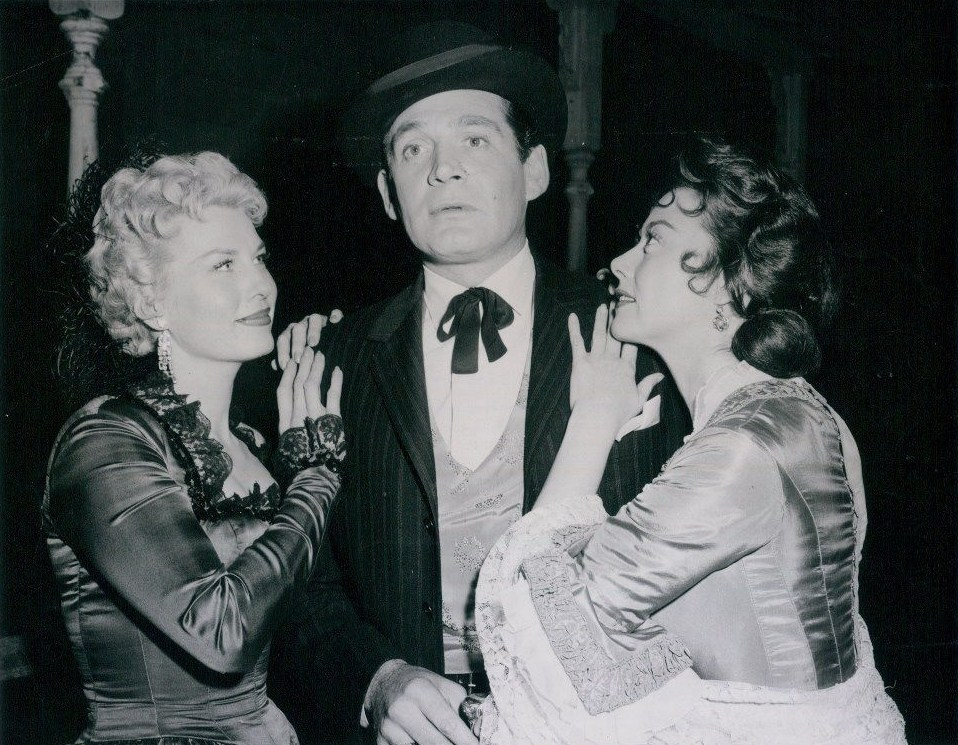
Jean Willes, Gene Barry and Adele Mara in first series episode

=== Main cast ===
- Gene Barry as Bat Masterson (108 episodes)
- Allison Hayes as Ellie Winters (7 episodes)
- Allen Jaffe as belligerent drunk (7 episodes)
- Ken Drake as Burdette (6 episodes)
- Troy Melton as government agent (6 episodes)

== Episodes ==
Season	Episodes	Originally released	
Season	Episodes	First released	Last released
1	37	October 8, 1958	July 29, 1959
2	37	October 1, 1959	July 1, 1960
3	34	September 29, 1960	June 1, 1961

== Production ==
=== Development ===
The series is a fictionalized account of the life of real-life Bat Masterson, who had been an Army scout, Indian fighter, lawman, and a deputy of Wyatt Earp. It was produced by Ziv Television Productions, and is loosely based on Richard O'Connor's 1957 biography of Masterson. This was highlighted by the book's front cover being shown at the end of the closing credits with an onscreen notation "based on". A 1959 TV Guide article quoted the producer as stating they wanted the show to be as accurate as possible. The series was sponsored by Kraft.

=== Casting ===
Gene Barry originally turned down the role of Bat Masterson because he preferred to stay working in film, and he did not like ordinary cowboys. But when Barry, who wore a homburg and chesterfield coat when looking for work as an actor in New York, found out the character carried a cane and wore a derby hat, he jumped at the opportunity. Barry was selected for the part directly by Fred Ziv. Barry was the only regular cast member of the series, while guest stars each week included both name and soon-to-be-name performers.

=== Production design ===
While Bat Masterson's dapper attire and gold-tipped cane might not seem like the look of a typical Wild West hero, Bat Masterson's derby hat and cane were trademarks of the real-life Masterson, having been presented to him by the citizens of Dodge City and were thus incorporated into the character as portrayed in the series. In the series, his cane contained a hidden sword.

=== Music ===
The popularity of the singing cowboys of the fifties led to several classic Westerns having themes resembling cowboy ballads, and Bat Masterson was no exception. According to BMI and the sheet music, the theme music was written by Havens Wray (although incorrectly spelled by BMI as Ravens Wray). However, it was likely written by David Rose, an ASCAP member who couldn't use his own name for a BMI composition. The words were by BMI writer Bart Corwin. The theme song was sung by Bill Lee, a member of the Mellomen.

=== Cancellation ===
Although Bat Masterson was positively reviewed by critics, the show was aired at a time when there were many other Westerns, and it was lost in the crowd. It never appeared in the Nielsen top 25. The show was cancelled after only three seasons.

== Release ==
=== Broadcast ===
The show originally aired on NBC from October 8, 1958 to September 21, 1961. It was placed in a different time slot for each of its three seasons:

- October 1958–September 1959, Wednesdays from 9:30–10:00
- October 1959–September 1960, Thursdays from 8:00–8:30
- September 1960–September 1961, Thursdays from 8:30–9:00

=== Home media ===
Barry and Goulart in 1961

TGG Direct released the first and second seasons on DVD in Region 1 on January 29, 2013. The third and final season was released on November 5, 2013. Due to licensing issues, the episode Terror on the Trinity is not included.

== Reception ==
A fictional Bat Masterson appeared in 34 episodes of the unrelated ABC/Desilu western series The Life and Legend of Wyatt Earp from 1955 to 1959. Mason Alan Dinehart played the role of Bat Masterson, with Hugh O'Brian as frontier peace officer Wyatt Earp. Dinehart was so associated with the role of Masterson that it was difficult for television audiences to adapt to a different actor in the role.

The show was extremely popular in Brazil. Gene Barry visited the country in 1961, the year that the show was first broadcast there, and he was received by President João Goulart for a talk in Brasilia.

== Other media ==
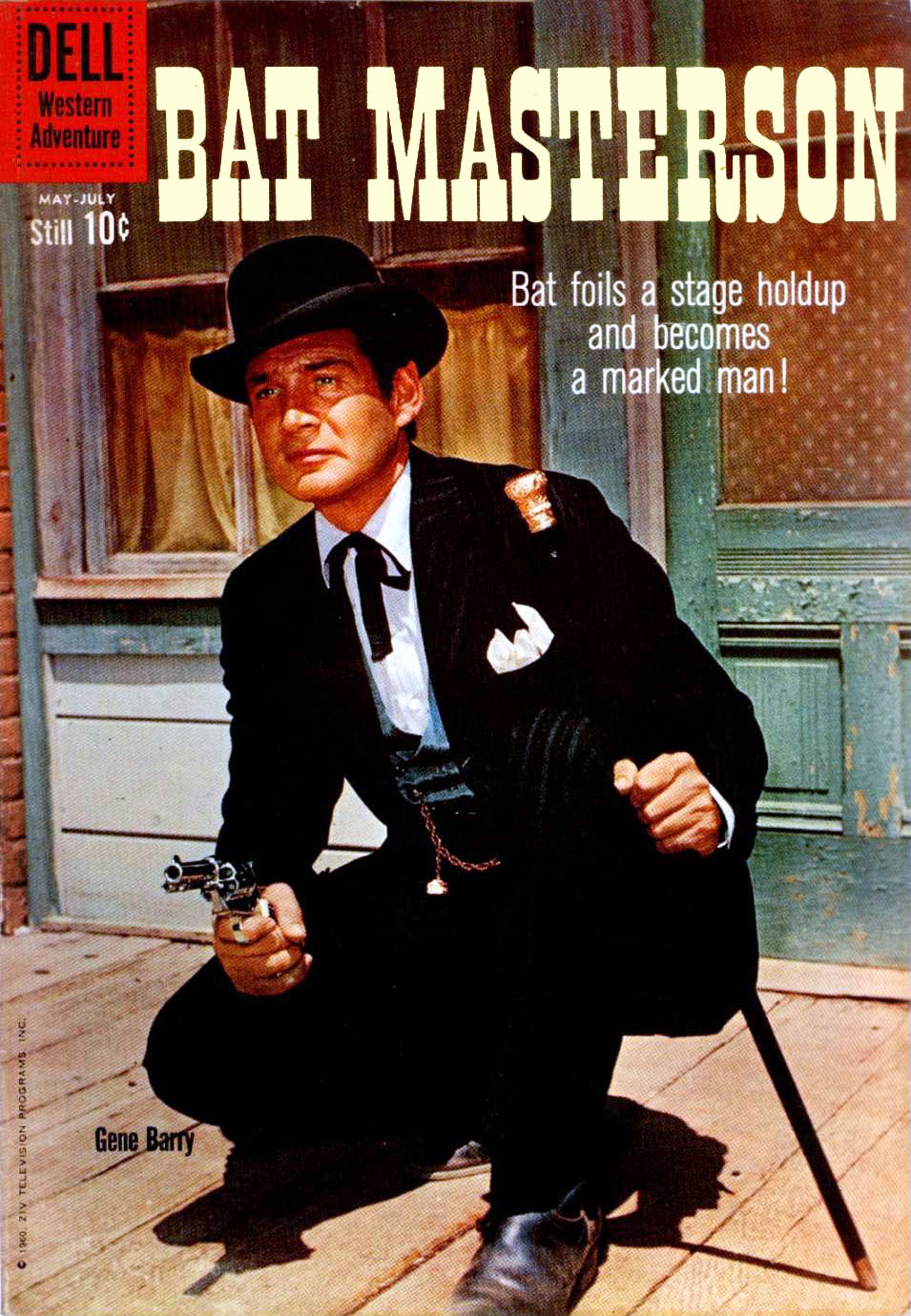
Front cover of Bat Masterson number 3 (Dell Comics, June, 1960)

=== Guns of Paradise (1990) ===
Barry recreated the role of Bat Masterson in an episode of the television series Guns of Paradise (1990), alongside Hugh O'Brian as Wyatt Earp.

=== The Gambler Returns: The Luck of the Draw (1991) ===
In The Gambler Returns: The Luck of the Draw (1991) Barry played Masterson, also with O'Brian as Earp, as well as Jack Kelly as Bart Maverick and Clint Walker as Cheyenne Bodie.

=== Comic book ===
Dell Comics issued nine issues of a quarterly Bat Masterson comic book between Aug./Oct. 1959 and Nov. 1961/Jan. 1962 with the initial issue a Four Color tryout (#1013).

=== Comic strip ===
Columbia Features syndicated a comic strip from September 7, 1959 to April 1960 written by Ed Herron and drawn by Howard Nostrand (Sept. 1959–Dec. 1959) and Bob Powell (Dec. 1959–April 1960). Nostrand was assisted (on backgrounds) by Neal Adams who had just graduated from the School of Industrial Arts; it was among his first professional art jobs.
