= Audrey Dalton =

Irish actress (born 1934)

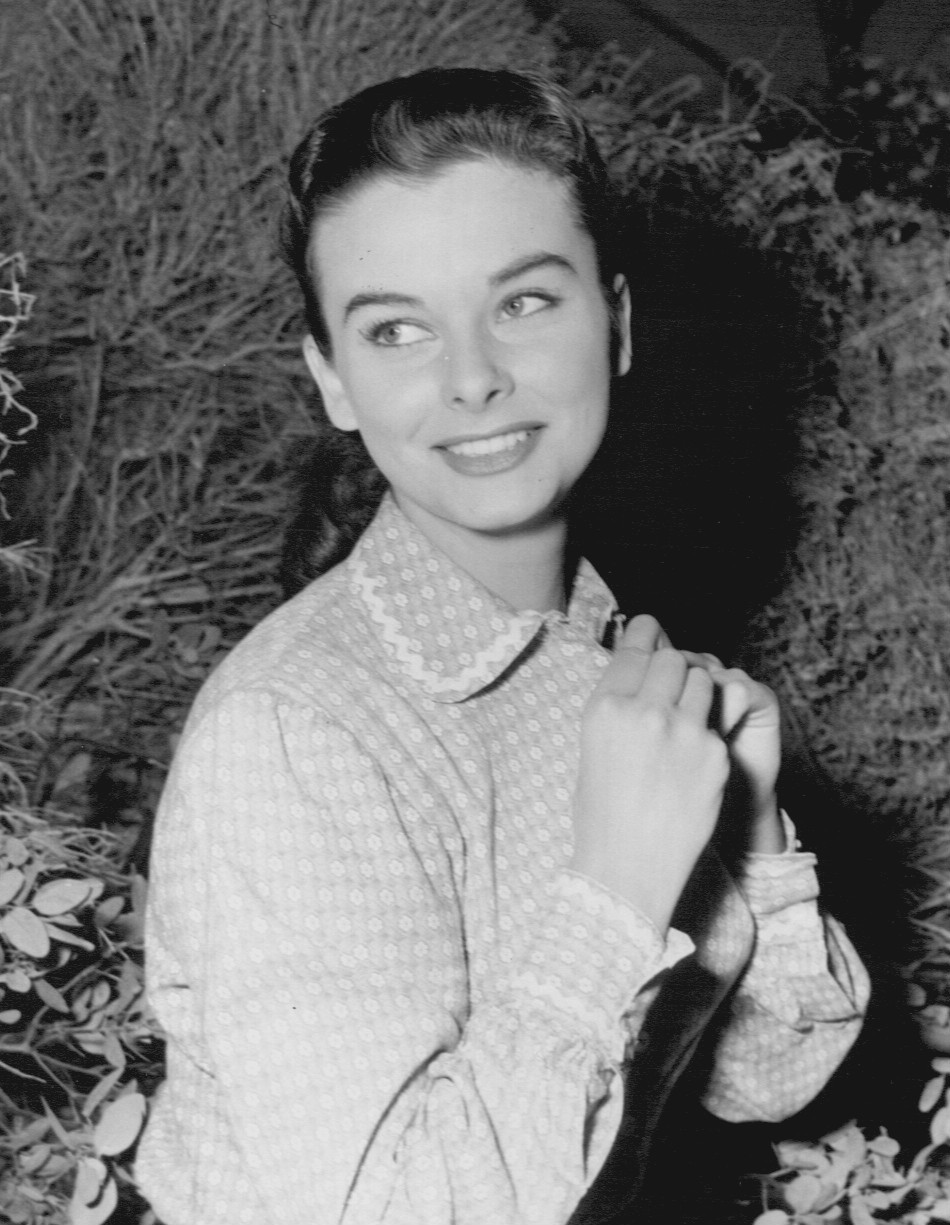
- Audrey Dalton in Wagon Train, 1958
- Born: 21 January 1934 (age 92); Dublin, Ireland
- Education: Royal Academy of Dramatic Art
- Occupation: Actress
- Years active: 1952–1978
- Spouse(s): James H. Brown (m.1953–div.1977); Rod F. Simenz (m. 1979)
- Children: 5
- Father: Emmet Dalton

Audrey Dalton (born 21 January 1934) is an Irish-born American retired actress who mostly worked in the United States during the Golden Age of Hollywood.

== Biography ==
Dalton was born in Dublin, Ireland, the daughter of Alice Shannon and soldier and film producer Emmet Dalton, the third of their five children. Her father was a recipient of the Military Cross for his service in the British Army in World War I. During the Irish Civil War, he was a major general in the National Army.

Dalton attended the Convent of the Sacred Heart in Dublin. After the family moved to London, she studied acting in the Royal Academy of Dramatic Art (RADA). She moved to the United States on 17 March 1952, for a part in The Girls of Pleasure Island. She took a break from acting in 1953 after the birth of her daughter, but returned in 1954, appearing in her first roles without using her British accent.

In 1977, Dalton divorced James H. Brown, father of her four children, after 25 years of marriage, and in 1979 married Rod F. Simenz, an engineer.

Among Dalton's many television appearances were six episodes of Wagon Train between 1958 and 1964. In 1958, she was Ellen Curry, the recipient of a million-dollar check in a 1958 episode of The Millionaire. She made a guest appearance on Perry Mason in 1961 as Kate Eastman in "The Case of the Injured Innocent." In 1962, she appeared on Gunsmoke (S8:E18) in "The Renegades".

She is a naturalized citizen of the United States, a practicing Roman Catholic, and she is a conservative Republican who was supportive of Richard Nixon, Gerald Ford, Ronald Reagan, George H.W. Bush, and George W. Bush.

== Filmography ==
- My Cousin Rachel (1952) as Louise Kendall
- The Girls of Pleasure Island (1953) as Hester Halyard
- Titanic (1953) as Annette Sturges
- Casanova's Big Night (1954) as Elena Di Gambetta
- Drum Beat (1954/I) as Nancy Meek
- The Prodigal (1955) as Ruth
- Confession (1955) as Louise Nelson
- The 20th Century-Fox Hour (1956, TV Series) as Carey Rydal
- Hold Back the Night (1956) as Kitty
- The Monster That Challenged the World (1957) as Gail MacKenzie
- Lux Video Theatre (1956–1957, TV Series) as Jean / Barbara / Romo
- The Bob Cummings Show (1957, TV Series) as Rita
- Thundering Jets (1958) as Susan Blair
- The Millionaire (1958, TV Series) as Ellen Curry
- Man with a Camera (1958, TV Series) as Sharon Rogers
- Separate Tables (1958) as Jean
- Disneyland (1959, TV Series) as Mrs. Cunningham
- Lone Texan (1959) as Susan Harvey
- This Other Eden (1959) as Maire McRoarty
- Thriller (22 November 1960, TV Series) as Norine in "The Prediction"
- Dante (1961, TV Series) as Hazel Kennicut
- The Aquanauts (1961, TV Series) as Sylvia Jurgen
- The Tab Hunter Show (1961, TV Series) as Ariel Evans
- National Velvet (1961, TV Series) as Fiona Mulcahey
- Bat Masterson (1958–1961, TV Series) as Cally Armitage / Abby Chancellor / Abigail Feather
- Lock Up (1961, TV Series) as Susan Carter
- Michael Shayne (1961, TV Series) as Pat Marshall
- Bringing Up Buddy (1961, TV Series) as Mary Beth Davenport / Ami Davenport
- Whispering Smith (1961, TV Series) as April Fanshaw
- Mr. Sardonicus (1961) as Baroness Maude Sardonicus
- The Investigators (1961, TV Series) as Constance Moreno (episode "The Oracle")
- Perry Mason (1961, TV Series) as Kate Eastman
- Checkmate (1961, TV Series) as Ann Miles
- King of Diamonds (1962, TV Series) as Lola Hayes
- Bonanza (1962, TV Series) as Melinda Banning
- Thriller (1960–1962, TV Series) as Meg O'Danagh Wheeler / Nesta Roberts / Norine Burton
- Kraft Mystery Theater (1962, TV Series) as Marion
- Ripcord (1962, TV Series) as Janice Dean
- Gunsmoke (1963, TV Series) as Lavinia
- Death Valley Days (1963, TV Series) as Mary O'Connell
- The Wide Country (1963, TV Series) as Nancy Kidwell
- The Dakotas (1963, TV Series) as Ronnie Kane
- Temple Houston (1963, TV Series) as Amy Hart
- Dr. Kildare (1964, TV Series) as Jo Grant
- Wagon Train (1958–1964, TV Series) as Danna Bannon / Lola Medina / Nancy Bigelow / Mary Naughton / Laura Grady / Harriet Field
- Kitten with a Whip (1964) as Virginia Stratton
- The Bounty Killer (1965) as Carole Ridgeway
- Voyage to the Bottom of the Sea (1965, TV Series) as Lydia Parrish
- Laredo (1965, TV Series) as Alice Coverly
- The Big Valley (1965–1966, TV Series) as Amy / Ann
- Insight (1966, TV Series)
- The Wild Wild West (1966, TV Series) as Veda Singh
- The Girl from U.N.C.L.E. (1966, TV Series) as Mrs. Wainright
- Dragnet 1967 (1967, TV Series) as Patricia Filmore
- Me and Benjy (1967, TV Movie) as Ruth
- Family Affair (1967, TV Series) as Mrs. Thompson
- Police Woman (1974–1978, TV Series) as Mrs. Hunter / Rose Hess (final appearance)
