= Michael Moore (actor) =

American film actor (1925–1998)

- Born: Michael Lang Morehouse; May 28, 1925; Boston, Massachusetts, U.S.
- Died: February 4, 1998 (aged 71); Medford, Oregon, U.S.
- Occupation: Film actor
- Years active: 1943–1956

Michael Lang Moore (né Morehouse; May 28, 1925 – February 4, 1998) was an American actor. He was known for playing the role of "Sgt. Manfredi" in the 1953 film Stalag 17.

== Career ==
Moore was born in Boston, Massachusetts. He began his career in 1943, first appearing in the film We've Never Been Licked, where he played the uncredited role of a student. He then played the role of "Bill Taff" in the 1951 film Silver City, after Moore came back into acting. Moore starred in the 1952 film The Atomic City, where he played the role of "Russ Farley", in which he starred with Gene Barry, Lydia Clarke, Nancy Gates and Lee Aaker.

Moore played the role of "Robert Clayton" in the 1953 film Jamaica Run. He also played the role of "Rance Hastings" in the film Pony Express. Moore appeared in films such as Little Boy Lost and The Desperate Hours and television programs such as Death Valley Days and The Adventures of Rin Tin Tin. He played the role of Sgt. Klinger in the 1953 film Sabre Jet. In the same year, Moore played the role of Sgt. Manfredi in Stalag 17, and the film was nominated for three Academy Awards.

Moore played the role of Roy in the 1954 film Alaska Seas. He retired in 1956, and his last credit was from the film The Ten Commandments.

== Filmography ==
Year	Title	Role	Notes
1943	We've Never Been Licked	Student	Uncredited
1951	Silver City	Bill Taff	
1952	The Atomic City	Russ Farley	
1953	Jamaica Run	Robert Clayton	
1953	Stalag 17	Sgt. Manfredi	
1953	Pony Express	Rance Hastings	
1953	Sabre Jet	Sgt. Klinger	
1953	Little Boy Lost	Attache	
1954	Alaska Seas	Roy	
1955	The Desperate Hours	Detective	Uncredited
1956	The Ten Commandments	Father	Uncredited, (final film role)
