= List of The Adventures of Rin-Tin-Tin episodes =

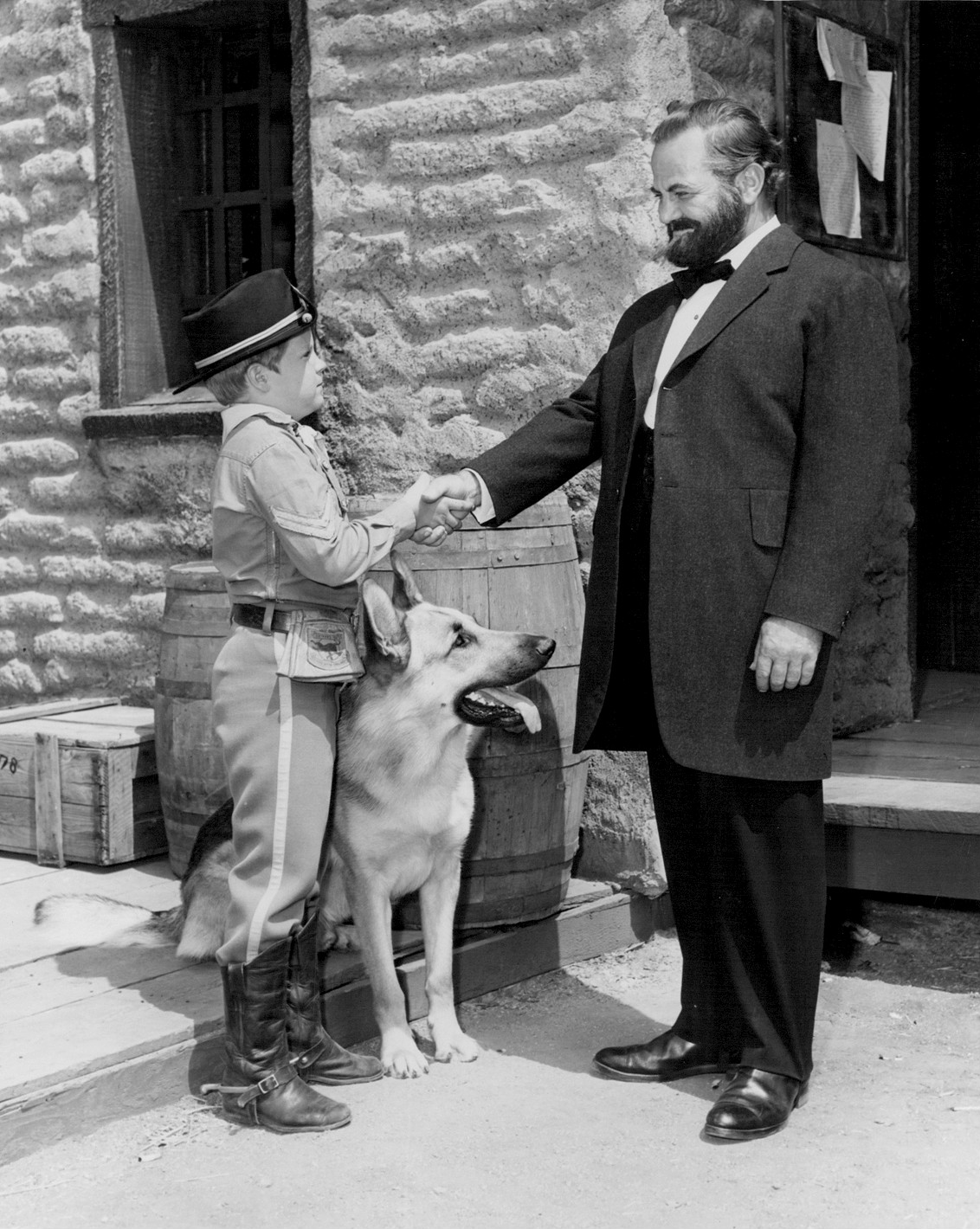
Paul Birch as President Grant, Lee Aaker as Rusty, and Rin Tin Tin IV in The Adventures of Rin Tin Tin

The Adventures of Rin-Tin-Tin is an American children's television series in the Western genre that aired from October 1954 to May 1959 on the ABC television network. In all, 164 episodes aired. The show starred Lee Aaker as Rusty, a boy orphaned in an Indian raid, who was being raised by the soldiers at a US Cavalry post known as Fort Apache. Rusty and his German Shepherd dog, Rin Tin Tin, help the soldiers to establish order in the American West. James E. Brown appeared as Lieutenant Ripley "Rip" Masters. Co-stars included Joe Sawyer as Sergeant Biff O'Hara and Rand Brooks as Corporal Randy Boone.

The character of Rin Tin Tin was named after Rin Tin Tin, a legendary screen dog of the 1920s and 1930s. The character was nominally played by Rin Tin Tin IV, who was either a descendant or related to the original dog. However, due to Rin Tin Tin IV's poor screen performance, the character was mostly performed by an unrelated dog, Flame Jr.

== Series overview ==
Season	Episodes	Originally released	
Season	Episodes	First released	Last released
1	34	October 15, 1954	June 3, 1955
2	38	September 9, 1955	June 1, 1956
3	40	September 7, 1956	June 21, 1957
4	26	September 20, 1957	April 18, 1958
5	26	September 19, 1958	May 8, 1959

== Episodes ==
=== Season 1 (1954-55) ===
No. overall	No. in season	Title	Directed by	Written by	Original release date
1	1	"Meet Rin Tin Tin"	Robert G. Walker	Douglas Heyes	October 15, 1954
2	2	"Wolf Cry"	Robert G. Walker	Douglas Heyes	October 22, 1954
3	3	"Rin Tin Tin in the Flaming Forest"	Robert G. Walker	Douglas Heyes	October 29, 1954
4	4	"Rin Tin Tin and the Raging River"	Robert G. Walker	Laurence Heath & Douglas Heyes	November 5, 1954
5	5	"The Killer Cat"	Robert G. Walker	Wallace Bosco & Douglas Heyes	November 12, 1954
6	6	"The Education of Corporal Rusty"	Robert G. Walker	Douglas Heyes & Frank L. Moss	November 19, 1954
7	7	"Rin Tin Tin and the Apache Chief"	Charles S. Gould	Lee Berg & Douglas Heyes	November 26, 1954
8	8	"Rin Tin Tin, Outlaw"	Charles S. Gould	Story by : Samuel Newman & Louis B. Appleton Jr. Screenplay by : Douglas Heyes	December 3, 1954
9	9	"The Outcast of Fort Apache"	Charles S. Gould	Douglas Heyes	December 10, 1954
10	10	"Rin Tin Tin and the Ancient Mariner"	Douglas Heyes	Roy Erwin	December 17, 1954
11	11	"Rin Tin Tin and the Raw Recruit"	Robert G. Walker	Douglas Heyes & Frank L. Moss	December 24, 1954
12	12	"Blood Brothers"	Douglas Heyes	Douglas Heyes & Paul Pierce	December 31, 1954
13	13	"Rin Tin Tin and the Gold Bullion"	Robert G. Walker	Douglas Heyes & Hugh King	January 7, 1955
14	14	"Rin Tin Tin and the Sacred Lance"	Don McDougall	Roy Erwin and Douglas Heyes	January 14, 1955
15	15	"Rin Tin Tin and the Shifting Sands"	Earl Bellamy	Roy Erwin & Douglas Heyes	January 21, 1955
16	16	"Rusty Plays Cupid"	Don McDougall	Story by : Samuel Newman & Louis B. Appleton Jr. Screenplay by : Wallace Bosco & Douglas Heyes	January 28, 1955
17	17	"Rin Tin Tin and the Medicine Man"	Don McDougall	Douglas Heyes	February 4, 1955
18	18	"Rin Tin Tin and the Babe in the Woods"	Robert G. Walker	Lee Berg and Douglas Heyes	February 11, 1955
19	19	"Rin Tin Tin and the Eagle's Nest"	Robert G. Walker	Douglas Heyes and Wallace Bosco	February 18, 1955
20	20	"Rusty Resigns from the Army"	Don McDougall	Story by : Samuel Newman and Louis B. Appleton Jr. Screenplay by : Douglas Heyes	February 25, 1955
21	21	"The Legacy of Sean O'Hara"	Robert G. Walker	Douglas Heyes and Wallace Bosco	March 4, 1955
22	22	"Rin Tin Tin and the Barber of Seville"	Robert G. Walker	Story by : Douglas Heyes; Screenplay by : Roy Erwin	March 11, 1955
23	23	"Rin Tin Tin and the Blushing Brides"	Don McDougall	Roy Erwin and Douglas Heyes	March 18, 1955
24	24	"The Guilty One"	Don McDougall	Douglas Heyes & Paul Garrison	March 25, 1955
25	25	"Rin Tin Tin and the Magic Box"	Robert G. Walker	Story by : Samuel Newman & Louis B. Appleton Jr. Screenplay by : Roy Erwin & Douglas Heyes	April 1, 1955
26	26	"Rin Tin Tin and the Bandit Kingdom"	Robert G. Walker	Story by : Douglas Heyes; Screenplay by : Wallace Bosco	April 8, 1955
27	27	"Rin Tin Tin and the Printer's Devil"	Robert G. Walker	Roy Erwin & Douglas Heyes	April 15, 1955
28	28	"Rin Tin Tin and the Dead Man's Gold"	Robert G. Walker	Douglas Heyes & Eve O'Hara	April 22, 1955
29	29	"Rin Tin Tin and the Ghost Town"	Robert G. Walker	Douglas Heyes & David Robinson	April 29, 1955
30	30	"O'Hara Gets Busted"	Earl Bellamy	Douglas Heyes	May 6, 1955
31	31	"Rin Tin Tin and the Bounty Hunters"	Earl Bellamy	Douglas Heyes	May 13, 1955
32	32	"Farewell to Fort Apache"	Robert G. Walker	Douglas Heyes & Paul Pierce	May 20, 1955
33	33	"Rin Tin Tin and the Lost Scotchman"	Don McDougall	Douglas Heyes & Wallace Bosco	May 27, 1955
34	34	"Rin Tin Tin and the Lonesome Road"	Robert G. Walker	Story by : Douglas Heyes; Screenplay by : Roy Erwin	June 3, 1955

=== Season 2 (1955–56) ===
No. overall	No. in season	Title	Directed by	Written by	Original release date
35	1	"Rin Tin Tin and the Bugle Call"	Robert G. Walker	Story by : Douglas Heyes; Teleplay by : Samuel F. Roeca	September 9, 1955
36	2	"Rin Tin Tin Meets Shakespeare"	Robert G. Walker	Douglas Heyes & David Robinson	September 16, 1955
37	3	"Rin Tin Tin and the Wild Stallion"	Robert G. Walker	John O'Dea & Jerry Thomas	September 23, 1955
38	4	"Rusty Volunteers"	Robert G. Walker	John O'Dea & Jerry Thomas	September 30, 1955
39	5	"Rin Tin Tin and the Poor Little Rich Boy"	Robert G. Walker	Douglas Heyes	October 7, 1955
40	6	"Rin Tin Tin and the White Buffalo"	Douglas Heyes	Douglas Heyes	October 14, 1955
41	7	"Rin Tin Tin Meets Mister President"	Earl Bellamy	Tony Barrett	October 21, 1955
42	8	"Rin Tin Tin and the Iron Horse"	Robert G. Walker	Story by : Douglas Heyes; Teleplay by : Paul Pierce	October 28, 1955
43	9	"Rin Tin Tin and the Connecticut Yankee"	Earl Bellamy	Roy Erwin	November 4, 1955
44	10	"Higgins Rides Again"	Robert G. Walker	Douglas Heyes	November 11, 1955
45	11	"Boone's Wedding Day"	Earl Bellamy	Lee Berg	November 18, 1955
46	12	"Rusty Goes to Town"	Robert G. Walker	Jerry Thomas & John O'Dea	November 25, 1955
47	13	"Rin Tin Tin and the Lost Patrol"	Unknown	Unknown	December 2, 1955
48	14	"Rin Tin Tin and the Star Witness"	Robert G. Walker	Story by : Roy Erwin; Teleplay by : Harry Bekkar	December 9, 1955
49	15	"Rin Tin Tin and the Last Chance"	Robert G. Walker	Tony Barrett & Paul Pierce	December 16, 1955
50	16	"Rin Tin Tin and the Christmas Story"	Douglas Heyes	Douglas Heyes	December 23, 1955
51	17	"Rin Tin Tin and the Indian Burial Grounds"	Unknown	Unknown	December 30, 1955
52	18	"Rin Tin Tin and the Missing Heir"	Douglas Heyes	John O'Dea & Jerry Thomas	January 13, 1956
53	19	"Rusty's Romance"	Robert G. Walker	Harry Bekkar	January 20, 1956
54	20	"Rin Tin Tin and the Tin Soldier"	Robert G. Walker	Lee Erwin	January 27, 1956
55	21	"Rin Tin Tin and the Big Top"	Unknown	Unknown	February 3, 1956
56	22	"Rusty's Bank Account"	Unknown	Unknown	February 10, 1956
57	23	"Rin Tin Tin Meets O'Hara's Mother"	Robert G. Walker	Charles Stewart	February 17, 1956
58	24	"Rin Tin Tin and the Return of the Ancient Mariner"	Don McDougall	Unknown	February 24, 1956
59	25	"The Failing Light"	Unknown	Unknown	March 2, 1956
60	26	"Rusty's Mystery"	Unknown	Unknown	March 9, 1956
61	27	"The Third Rider"	Douglas Heyes	Douglas Heyes	March 16, 1956
62	28	"Rusty Surrenders"	Earl Bellamy	John O'Dea & Jerry Thomas	March 23, 1956
63	29	"Rin Tin Tin and the Rainmaker"	Harve Foster	Story by : Michael Cramoy; Teleplay by : John O'Dea & Jerry Thomas	March 30, 1956
64	30	"Scotchman's Gold"	Douglas Heyes	Roy Erwin	April 6, 1956
65	31	"Attack on Fort Apache"	Douglas Heyes	Douglas Heyes & Paul Pierce	April 13, 1956
66	32	"Rin Tin Tin and Homer the Great"	Robert G. Walker	Story by : Harry Poppe Jr. Teleplay by : John O'Dea & Jerry Thomas	April 20, 1956
67	33	"Rinty Finds a Bone"	Douglas Heyes	Charles Stewart	April 27, 1956
68	34	"Rin Tin Tin Meets Mister Nobody"	Robert G. Walker	Douglas Heyes	May 4, 1956
69	35	"Rin Tin Tin and the Circle of Fire"	Harve Foster	Buckley Angell	May 11, 1956
70	36	"Hubert Goes West"	Robert G. Walker	John O'Dea & Jerry Thomas	May 18, 1956
71	37	"Rin Tin Tin and the Lost Treasure"	Robert G. Walker	Charles Stewart	May 25, 1956
72	38	"Rin Tin Tin and the Second Chance"	Robert G. Walker	John O'Dea & Jerry Thomas	June 1, 1956

=== Season 3 (1956-57) ===
No. overall	No. in season	Title	Directed by	Written by	Original release date
73	1	"Forward Ho!"	Douglas Heyes	Douglas Heyes	September 7, 1956
74	2	"Rin Tin Tin and the Witch of the Woods"	Douglas Heyes	Roy Erwin	September 14, 1956
75	3	"Sorrowful Joe"	Charles S. Gould	Story by : Ty Cobb; Teleplay by : Buckley Angell & Jerry Thomas	September 21, 1956
76	4	"Rin Tin Tin and the Return of the Chief"	Harry Gerstad	John O'Dea & Jerry Thomas	September 28, 1956
77	5	"Silent Battle"	Robert G. Walker	Lee Erwin	October 5, 1956
78	6	"Yo-o Rinty"	Douglas Heyes	Douglas Heyes	October 12, 1956
79	7	"Rin Tin Tin and the White Wolf"	Lew Landers	Lee Berg & John O'Dea	October 19, 1956
80	8	"Return of Rin Tin Tin"	Lew Landers	John O'Dea	October 26, 1956
81	9	"Boone's Grandpappy"	Robert G. Walker	Jennings Cobb & Jerry Thomas	November 2, 1956
82	10	"The Lost Puppy"	Robert G. Walker	Lee Erwin	November 9, 1956
83	11	"Presidential Citation"	Robert G. Walker	John O'Dea	November 16, 1956
84	12	"Wagon Train"	Lew Landers	Lee Erwin & Jerry Thomas	November 23, 1956
85	13	"Fort Adventure"	Unknown	Unknown	November 30, 1956
86	14	"Rin Tin Tin and the Invaders"	Robert G. Walker	John O'Dea & Jerry Thomas	December 14, 1956
87	15	"Racing Rails"	Lew Landers	Buckley Angell & Arthur Rowe	December 28, 1956
88	16	"Higgins' Last Stand"	Robert G. Walker	Roy Erwin	January 4, 1957
89	17	"The Indian Hater"	Robert G. Walker	Story by : Arthur Browne Jr. Teleplay by : Jerry Thomas & Arthur Browne Jr.	January 11, 1957
90	18	"Rin Tin Tin Meets the Southern Colonel"	Lew Landers	Jennings Cobb & Jerry Thomas	January 18, 1957
91	19	"The Warrior's Promise"	Lew Landers	Arthur Fitzrichards	January 25, 1957
92	20	"Sorrowful Joe Returns"	Lew Landers	Jerry Thomas	February 1, 1957
93	21	"The Lieutenant's Lesson"	Lew Landers	Jennings Cobb	February 8, 1957
94	22	"The Swedish Cook"	Unknown	Unknown	February 15, 1957
95	23	"Rusty Gets Busted"	Lew Landers	Sidney Morse	February 22, 1957
96	24	"O'Hara's Gold"	Unknown	Teleplay by : Jerry Thomas; Based on a Short story by : Ralph W. Peterson	March 1, 1957
97	25	"O'Hara Gets Culture"	Unknown	Unknown	March 8, 1957
98	26	"The Frame-Up"	Unknown	Unknown	March 15, 1957
99	27	"Boone's Commission"	Unknown	Unknown	March 22, 1957
100	28	"The Silent Witness"	Lew Landers	Jennings Cobb	March 29, 1957
101	29	"Indian Blood"	Lew Landers	John O'Dea	April 5, 1957
102	30	"The Old Soldier"	Lew Landers	Don Brand & Lee Erwin	April 12, 1957
103	31	"Stagecoach Sally"	Lew Landers	Jerry Thomas	April 19, 1957
104	32	"Bitter Medicine"	Unknown	Unknown	April 26, 1957
105	33	"Corporal Carson"	Lew Landers	Jerry Thomas	May 3, 1957
106	34	"Hubert's Niece"	Fred Jackman Jr.	Jerry Thomas	May 10, 1957
107	35	"O'Hara Gets Amnesia"	Fred Jackman Jr.	Sidney Morse	May 17, 1957
108	36	"Along Came Tubbs"	Lew Landers	John O'Dea & Jerry Thomas	May 24, 1957
109	37	"Swanson's Choice"	Lew Landers	Arthur Rowe	May 31, 1957
110	38	"The Gentle Kingdom"	Fred Jackman Jr.	Roy Erwin & Jerry Thomas	June 7, 1957
111	39	"The Swapper"	Lew Landers	Jennings Cobb	June 14, 1957
112	40	"The Old Man of the Mountain"	Fred Jackman Jr.	John O'Dea	June 21, 1957

=== Season 4 (1957-58) ===
No. overall	No. in season	Title	Directed by	Written by	Original release date
113	1	"Return to Fort Apache"	Robert G. Walker	Jennings Cobb	September 20, 1957
114	2	"The Courtship of Marshal Higgins"	Robert G. Walker	Roy Erwin	September 27, 1957
115	3	"Rusty's Reward"	Fred Jackman Jr.	Jerry Thomas	October 4, 1957
116	4	"A Look of Eagles"	Robert G. Walker	Roy Erwin	October 11, 1957
117	5	"The Last Navajo"	Robert G. Walker	John O'Dea	October 18, 1957
118	6	"Mother O'Hara's Marriage"	William Beaudine	Jennings Cobb	October 25, 1957
119	7	"Hostage of War Bonnet"	Fred Jackman Jr.	John O'Dea	November 1, 1957
120	8	"Rodeo Clown"	Fred Jackman Jr.	Sidney Morse	November 8, 1957
121	9	"Rusty's Strategy"	Fred Jackman Jr.	Roy Erwin	November 15, 1957
122	10	"Frontier Angel"	Unknown	Unknown	November 22, 1957
123	11	"The Hunted"	Robert G. Walker	Jennings Cobb	December 6, 1957
124	12	"White Chief"	Robert G. Walker	Jerry Thomas	December 13, 1957
125	13	"Boundary Busters"	Unknown	Unknown	December 20, 1957
126	14	"Rin Tin Tin and the River Chase"	Robert G. Walker	John O'Dea & Samuel F. Roeca	January 10, 1958
127	15	"Top Gun"	Fred Jackman Jr.	John O'Dea	January 24, 1958
128	16	"Tomahawk Tubbs"	Fred Jackman Jr.	Jerry Thomas	February 7, 1958
129	17	"The New C.O."	Fred Jackman Jr.	John O'Dea	February 14, 1958
130	18	"Pritikin's Predicament"	Unknown	Unknown	February 21, 1958
131	19	"Rusty's Remedy"	Fred Jackman Jr.	Jerry Thomas	February 28, 1958
132	20	"Spanish Gold"	Robert G. Walker	Roy Erwin	March 7, 1958
133	21	"Bitter Bounty"	William Beaudine	John O'Dea	March 14, 1958
134	22	"Sorrowful Joe's Policy"	William Beaudine	Jerry Thomas	March 21, 1958
135	23	"Border Incident"	William Beaudine	Unknown	March 28, 1958
136	24	"Wind-Wagon McClanahan"	William Beaudine	Roy Erwin	April 4, 1958
137	25	"Rin Tin Tin and the Secret Weapon"	William Beaudine	Victor McLeod	April 11, 1958
138	26	"Brave Bow"	Fred Jackman Jr.	John O'Dea	April 18, 1958

=== Season 5 (1958-59) ===
No. overall	No. in season	Title	Directed by	Written by	Original release date
139	1	"The General's Daughter"	Robert G. Walker	Arthur Rowe	September 19, 1958
140	2	"Escape to Danger"	William Beaudine	Unknown	September 26, 1958
141	3	"Decision of Rin Tin Tin"	Fred Jackman Jr.	Jerry Thomas	October 3, 1958
142	4	"The Foot Soldier"	Robert G. Walker	Roy Erwin & Jerry Thomas	October 10, 1958
143	5	"Rusty's Opportunity"	Robert G. Walker	Story by : Sheila Lynch; Teleplay by : Jerry Thomas	October 17, 1958
144	6	"Running Horse"	William Beaudine	Unknown	October 24, 1958
145	7	"The Cloudbusters"	William Beaudine	Jennings Cobb	October 31, 1958
146	8	"Deadman's Valley"	William Beaudine	Arthur Rowe	November 7, 1958
147	9	"Grandpappy's Love Affair"	Lew Landers	Jennings Cobb	November 14, 1958
148	10	"The Epidemic"	William Beaudine	Unknown	November 21, 1958
149	11	"The Best Policy"	William Beaudine	Unknown	December 5, 1958
150	12	"Miracle of the Mission"	William Beaudine	Unknown	December 12, 1958
151	13	"Star of India"	Lew Landers	Roy Erwin	January 2, 1959
152	14	"The Misfit Marshal"	William Beaudine	Jerry Thomas	January 9, 1959
153	15	"Old Betsy"	William Beaudine	Victor McLeod & Jerry Thomas	January 16, 1959
154	16	"Stagecoach to Phoenix"	Lew Landers	Jerry Thomas	January 23, 1959
155	17	"Major Mockingbird"	William Beaudine	Unknown	January 30, 1959
156	18	"The Matador"	William Beaudine	Roy Erwin	February 6, 1959
157	19	"The Accusation"	Lew Landers	Arthur Rowe	February 13, 1959
158	20	"Royal Recruit"	William Beaudine	Unknown	February 20, 1959
159	21	"The Devil Rides Point"	William Beaudine	Unknown	February 27, 1959
160	22	"Pillajohn's Progress"	William Beaudine	Jerry Thomas	March 6, 1959
161	23	"The Ming Vase"	Unknown	Unknown	March 13, 1959
162	24	"Apache Stampede"	Lew Landers	Story by : John O'Dea; Teleplay by : John O'Dea & Jerry Thomas	March 20, 1959
163	25	"The Luck of O'Hara"	William Beaudine	John O'Dea	April 3, 1959
164	26	"The Failure"	Robert G. Walker	Roy Erwin & Douglas Heyes	May 8, 1959
