= Sabre Jet (film) =

1953 film

- Original film poster
- Directed by: Louis King
- Screenplay by: Dale Eunson; Katherine Albert
- Story by: Carl Krueger
- Produced by: Carl Krueger
- Starring: Robert Stack; Coleen Gray; Richard Arlen; Julie Bishop; Leon Ames
- Cinematography: Charles Van Enger; Tom Tutwiler (aerial photography)
- Edited by: Arthur H. Nadel
- Music by: Herschel Burke Gilbert
- Production company: Carl Krueger Productions
- Distributed by: United Artists
- Release date: September 4, 1953 (United States)
- Running time: 90 minutes
- Country: United States
- Language: English

Sabre Jet is a 1953 American drama war film set during the Korean War, directed by Louis King and starring Robert Stack, Coleen Gray, Richard Arlen, Julie Bishop and Leon Ames. It was shot in Cinecolor using United States Air Force footage. Sabre Jet was based on a story by the producer Carl Krueger with the screenplay written by the husband and wife playwright and screenwriting team of Dale Eunson and Katherine Albert. The opening credits state: "This picture is dedicated to the air force wives who shared their men with a world made desperate by the most brutal aggressor in history."

== Plot ==
The United States Air Force at Itazuke Air Base during the Korean War has a visitor: Jane Carter, a female journalist who wishes to do a feature story on the wives of the American pilots. Jane admits to the wing commander, General Hale, that she is the wife of one of his squadron leaders, Colonel Gil Manton. This surprises everyone.

Gil and Jane have been separated for two years. Jane prefers life under her former name as a major journalist with frequent travel, while Gil prefers a wife who will stay home and have a family. Gil is not only upset that Jane left their anniversary celebration to get a story from the wife of a Death Row prisoner about to be executed, but also feels Jane callously used and exploited the woman for a story. Gil has kept their separation a secret, as a divorce would hurt his career.

Jane meets the wives and learns their motivations and that though they are open with each other, they hide their fears from their husbands lest it affect their performance.

Meanwhile, with the Korean War raging, military intelligence has discovered a North Korean air base filled with Soviet-built Mikoyan-Gurevich MiG-15 fighter jets and piston-engine Yakovlev Yak-9 aircraft threatening the United Nations forces. General Hale wishes to lead a carefully synchronized combined airstrike of Boeing B-29 Superfortress bombers escorted by North American F-86 Sabres to deal with the enemy aircraft and Lockheed F-80 Shooting Star ground-attack aircraft to destroy the enemy’s anti-aircraft defenses.

General Hale’s superiors are sympathetic but inform the general that approval for such a massive combined operation could take a long time to obtain. Hale replies that the wet season in North Korea will begin in a week, which would make the operation impossible once it has begun.

General Hale disobeys orders by personally flying an F-86 on a reconnaissance mission without escort over the target. After he leaves, intelligence discovers the air base is located elsewhere and that what the general is flying over is a stronghold full of anti-aircraft weapons and enemy fighter aircraft.

The general is shot down; Jane is with the general's wife, Marge, when Gil breaks the news of the loss of the general. Marge's composure and courage brings Jane to tears and makes her reevaluate her marriage and behavior towards Gil.

Gil takes over command of the fighter wing and leads the escort mission protecting F-80 fighter-bombers and B-29 bombers on an attack against the North Korean air base. While their mission is successful, Gil loses three jet pilots. After consoling the wives of the pilots that were lost, Gil sees Jane waiting for him at the gate, and they embrace.

== Cast ==
- Robert Stack as Col. Gil Manton
- Coleen Gray as Mrs. Gil Manton aka Jane Carter
- Richard Arlen as Gen. Robert Hale
- Julie Bishop as Mrs. Marge Hale
- Leon Ames as Lt. Col. George Eckert
- Amanda Blake as Helen Daniel
- Reed Sherman as Lt. Ronnie Crane
- Michael Moore as Sgt. Klinger
- Lucy Knoch as Lee Crane
- Tom Irish as Lt. Bill Crenshaw
- Kathleen Crowley as Susan Crenshaw
- Jerry Paris as Capt. Bert Flanagan
- Jan Shepard as Betty Flanagan

== Production ==
Producer Carl Krueger had previously produced the William Wyler aviation film Thunderbolt! (1947) that was shot during World War II but not released until after the conflict. (Note: In 1966 Krueger attempted to produce a screenplay about the USAF in the Vietnam War called Wings of the Tiger. When Hollywood would not produce the film, he turned the screenplay into a novel of the same name.)

The film was announced in February 1953. Krueger would make it independently for United Artists.

Sabre Jet was made in cooperation with the United States Air Force and used four Korean War veterans of the air war as technical advisors. (Note: North American Aviation was also credited for its assistance to the film.) The film was mostly shot at Nellis Air Force Base near Las Vegas but also featured extensive use of actual World War II aerial combat film footage. (Note: The archival footage was a "... very poor use of combat stock footage ... mainly World War II vintage piston-engined fighters and B-17 bombers being shot down!") When Sabre Jet eventually was relegated to television broadcasts, the film was screened in a black-and-white version.

The aircraft seen in Sabre Jet include Lockheed F-80 Shooting Star fighters as well as F-86 Sabres. Other aircraft included Republic F-84 Thunderjet, Aeronca L-16A, Douglas A-26 Invader and Boeing B-29 Superfortress (in archive footage). A number of F-86 Sabres were repainted to act as MiG-15s.

== Reception ==
Sabre Jet was premiered in Dayton, Ohio, on September 3, 1953, during the National Air Show, in the presence of nine Korean aces, including Joseph McConnell Jr. The film was critically reviewed by Bosley Crowther in The New York Times. He noted: "You'd never guess it from the title, but the little picture called 'Sabre Jet', which opened last night at the Criterion, is a great deal more concerned with the bravery of the wives of jet pilots than with that of the fellows who fly the planes." In his book The Aircraft-Spotter's Film and Television Companion, aviation film historian Simon D. Beck considered Sabre Jet a "... thoughtful if emotionally distant" account of the air war in Korea.

In similar reviews, aviation film historian Stephen Pendo described Sabre Jet as a "weak" example of the air war in Korea, especially singling out the female characters as being a stereotype of military wives, who were "... overly hysterical" when their husbands went to war. In a similar assessment, aviation film historian Michael Paris noted that the film was built around two elements, the missions flown by "Sabre" fighter pilots, and the effect on their families.
