= The Adventures of Rin-Tin-Tin =

American children's television series (1954–1959)

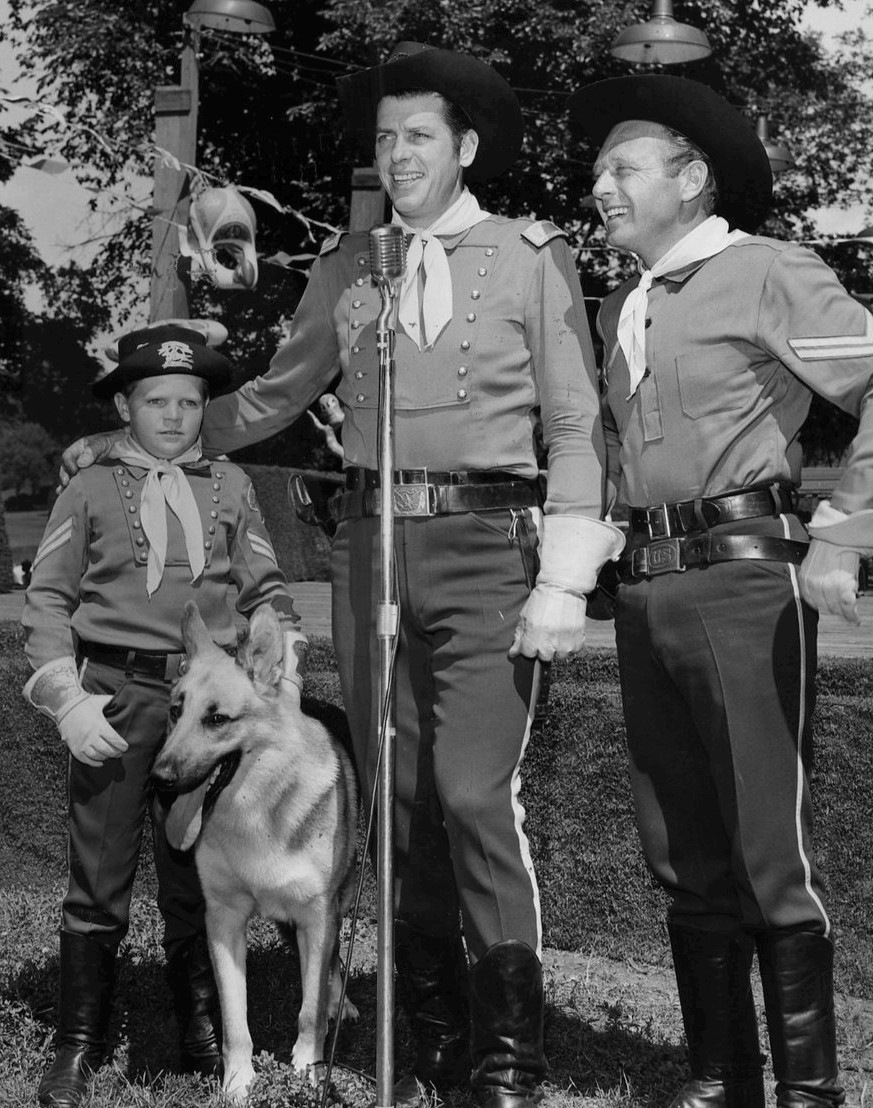
- From left: Lee Aaker, Rin-Tin-Tin, James Brown, and Rand Brooks in 1956.
- Genre: Adventure; Family; Western
- Directed by: Robert G. Walker; William Beaudine
- Starring: Lee Aaker; James Brown; Joe Sawyer; Rand Brooks; Rin Tin Tin, Flame Jr., other dogs
- Country of origin: United States
- Original language: English
- No. of seasons: 5
- No. of episodes: 164 (list of episodes)

Production
- Producer: Herbert B. Leonard
- Running time: 25–27 minutes
- Production company: Screen Gems

Original release
- Network: ABC
- Release: October 15, 1954 – May 8, 1959

Related
- Boots and Saddles

The Adventures of Rin-Tin-Tin is an American children's Western television series that aired 164 episodes from October 1954 to May 1959 on the ABC television network.

The show starred Lee Aaker as Rusty, a boy orphaned in an Indian raid, who was being raised by the soldiers at a US Cavalry post known as Fort Apache. Rusty and his German Shepherd dog, Rin Tin Tin, help the soldiers to establish order in the American West. James E. Brown appeared as Lieutenant Ripley "Rip" Masters. Co-stars included Joe Sawyer as Sergeant Biff O'Hara and Rand Brooks as Corporal Randy Boone.

The character of Rin Tin Tin was named after Rin Tin Tin, a legendary screen dog of the 1920s and 1930s. The character was nominally played by Rin Tin Tin IV, who was either a descendant or related to the original dog. However, due to Rin Tin Tin IV's poor screen performance, the character was mostly performed by unrelated dogs belonging to trainer Frank Barnes, primarily one named Flame Jr.

== Synopsis ==
Rusty and his dog, Rin Tin Tin (Rinty), are the only survivors of an Indian raid on their wagon train. The boy and his dog are adopted by the 101st Cavalry at Fort Apache, Arizona, where Rusty is given the honorary rank of corporal. Throughout the series, Rusty and Rinty help the cavalry and the nearby people to establish order in the American West.

== Cast ==
- Lee Aaker as Corporal Rusty "B-Company"
- James Brown as Lt. Ripley "Rip" Masters
- Rin Tin Tin IV/Flame Jr. as Rin Tin Tin
- Joe Sawyer as Sgt. Biff O'Hara
- Rand Brooks as Corporal Randy Boone
- William Forrest as Major Swanson
- Hal Hopper as Cpl. Clark
- John Hoyt as Colonel Barker
- Harry Strang as Sheriff
- Dean Fredericks as Komawi
- Mildred von Hollen as Mrs. Barrington
- George Keymas as Black Billy
- Ralph Moody as Silas Gunn
- Tom McKee as Capt. Davis
- William Fawcett as Captain Longey/Marshal George Higgins
- Morris Ankrum as Chief Red Eagle
- Lane Bradford as Barrows
- Ernest Sarracino as Hamid Bey
- Jack Littlefield as Karl
- Dehl Berti as Katawa
- Bill Hale as Cole Hogarth
- Steven Ritch as Lone Hawk
- Lee Roberts as Aaron Depew
- Larry Chance as Apache Jack
- Charles Stevens as Geronimo
- Gordon Richards as Hubert Twombly
- Pierre Watkin as The Vet
- Tommy Farrell as Carpenter
- Harry Hickox as John Carter
- Andy Clyde as Homer Tubbs
- Ed Hinton as Seth Ramsey
- Patrick Whyte as McKenzie
- Stanley Andrews as Ed Whitmore
- Abel Fernandez as O-ye-tza
- Louis Lettieri as Chief Pokiwah
- Jan Arvan as Chief Running Horse
- William Henry as Bill Anderson

=== Guest stars ===
- Mary Adams
- Rico Alaniz
- Chris Alcaide
- Roscoe Ates
- Rayford Barnes
- Ray Boyle
- Lane Bradford
- X Brands
- Robert Burton
- Bill Coontz
- Noreen Corcoran
- Richard Devon
- William Fawcett
- Dean Fredericks
- Terry Frost
- Robert Fuller
- Robert Griffin
- Herman Hack
- Ron Hagerthy
- Edmund Hashim
- Rodolfo Hoyos Jr.
- Anthony Jochim
- Brad Johnson
- William Kendis
- Robert Knapp
- Lou Krugman
- Ethan Laidlaw
- Nolan Leary
- Norman Leavitt
- William Leslie
- Ken Mayer
- Kermit Maynard
- Ewing Mitchell
- John Pickard
- Richard Reeves
- Chuck Roberson
- Jan Shepard
- Harry Dean Stanton
- William Tannen
- Lee Van Cleef
- Max Wagner
- Peter Walker
- Alan Wells

== Episodes ==
Season	Episodes	Originally released	
Season	Episodes	First released	Last released
1	34	October 15, 1954	June 3, 1955
2	38	September 9, 1955	June 1, 1956
3	40	September 7, 1956	June 21, 1957
4	26	September 20, 1957	April 18, 1958
5	26	September 19, 1958	May 8, 1959

== Production ==
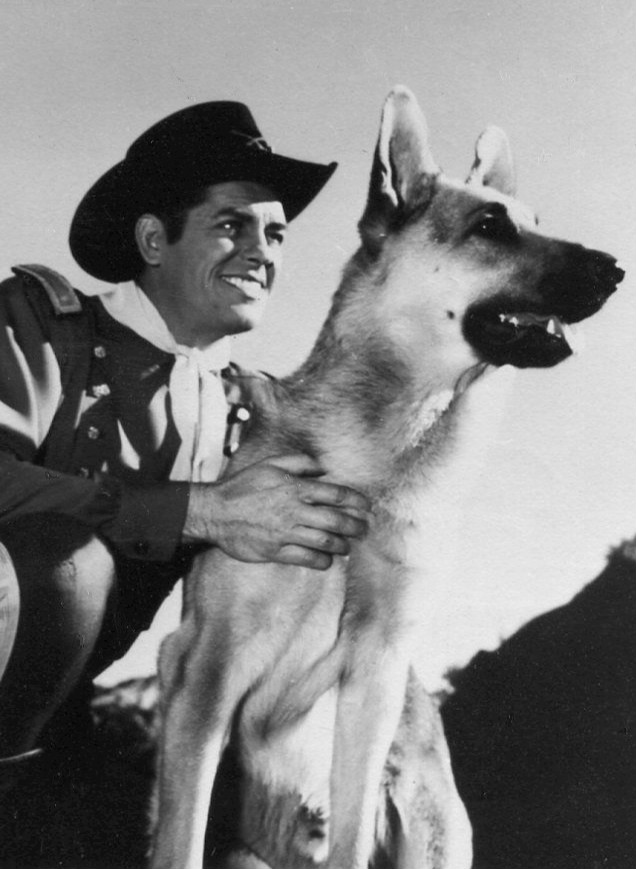
Brown and Rin Tin Tin on a 1955 publicity postcard

=== Development ===
Producer Herbert Leonard got the idea for the show while shooting at the Corrigan Movie Ranch. He had taken his lunch at the Fort Apache set and got the idea for the entire format, but he needed to convince "Rinty" owner Lee Duncan to get the rights. Leonard convinced Douglas Heyes to work on the script and they presented it to Duncan. Duncan and Leonard made the agreement to do the show over a handshake and an initial payment of ten dollars.

=== Casting ===
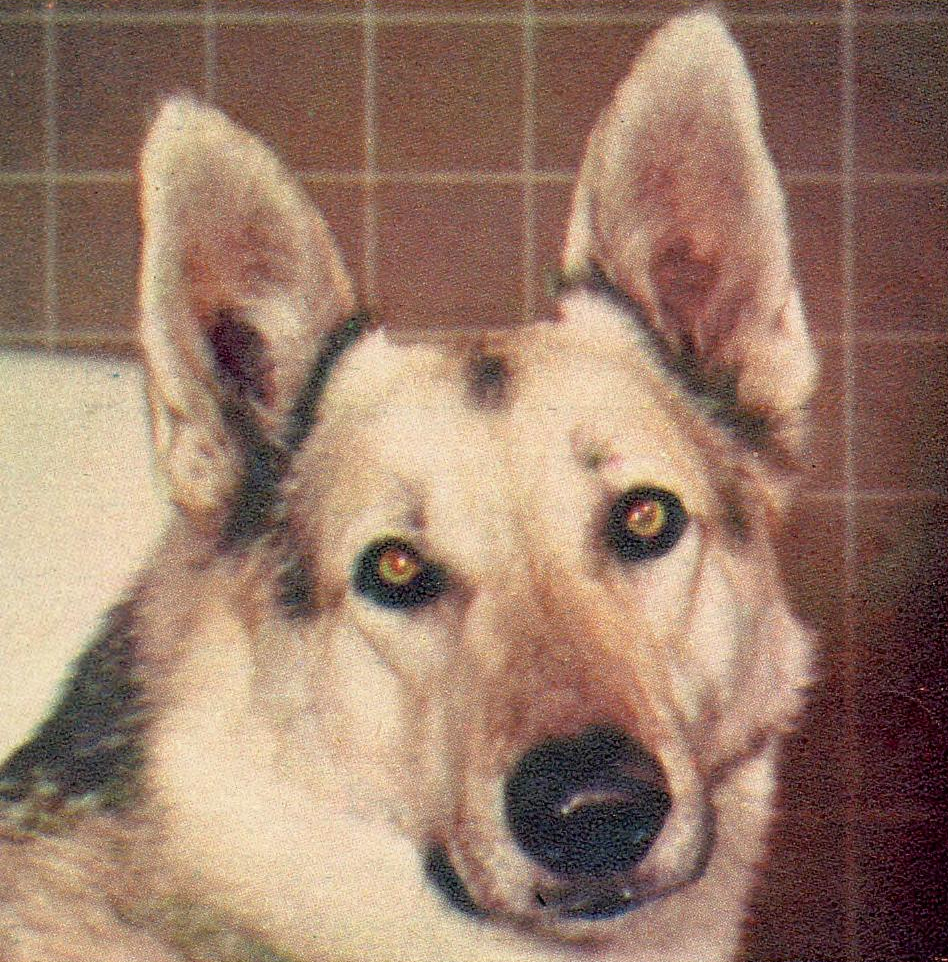
Rin Tin Tin IV c. 1954

Three different German Shepherds were used as the titular character. Rin Tin Tin IV and one other dog were descended from the original "Rinty" of movie fame. The other dog used was an unrelated dog named Flame, Jr. Due to Rin Tin Tin IV's poor screen performance, the character was mostly performed by Flame, Jr.

=== Filming ===
The episodes were filmed on a low budget, with Screen Gems limiting it to less than $50,000 per episode. Outdoor action was shot largely at Corriganville Movie Ranch northwest of Los Angeles in Simi Valley, where the production made ample use of the facility's set from the movie Fort Apache. Additional action sequences were shot on the Iverson Movie Ranch in Chatsworth, known for its huge sandstone boulders and widely recognized as the most heavily filmed outdoor shooting location in the history of Hollywood.

The show's troupe of twelve character actors was often required to play multiple parts in the same episode, sometimes to the point of one actor fighting himself, wearing a cavalry uniform in one shot and an Apache outfit in another.

== Themes ==
As a show targeting the youth audience, it not only displayed stories with action, but also included moral lessons. Actor James Brown explained, "Our stories simply taught that right was right and wrong was wrong."

== Broadcast ==
The show ran for five seasons on ABC on Friday evenings from October 1954 to May 1959. ABC reran the series on late afternoons from September 1959 to September 1961. During its first season (1954-1955), The Adventures of Rin Tin Tin finished at number 23 in the Nielsen ratings, making it the second-highest rated series on ABC at the time behind Disneyland, which placed number six.

Reruns ran on Saturdays on CBS from September 1962 until September 1964. A new package of reruns was shown in 1976, and continued into the mid-1980s. The original black-and-white prints were tinted sepia with new opening and closing segments filmed in color in Utah. Due to poor scheduling practices of local stations, the rebroadcasts were not successful.

Modern syndication includes remastered episodes produced by Cerulean Digital Color and Animation, with lines redubbed for some scenes using actors other than those from the original series cast, with a different generic theme song.

== Reception ==
Critics were generally positive, with TV Guide calling it "crammed with action, gunplay and chase scenes," and that it "makes fine viewing for kids and nostalgic viewing for grownups". Variety, however, was much more critical, calling Aaker "precocious" and "not helped by the direction", and that "the dog does nothing exceptional either".
