= The Atomic City =

1952 film by Jerry Hopper

- Directed by: Jerry Hopper
- Written by: Sydney Boehm
- Produced by: Joseph Sistrom
- Starring: Gene Barry; Lydia Clarke; Michael Moore; Nancy Gates; Lee Aaker
- Cinematography: Charles B. Lang Jr
- Edited by: Archie Marshek
- Music by: Leith Stevens
- Distributed by: Paramount Pictures
- Release date: May 1, 1952 (New York)
- Running time: 85 minutes
- Country: United States
- Language: English

The Atomic City is a 1952 American thriller film noir film directed by Jerry Hopper and starring Gene Barry and Lydia Clarke.

The plot involves a nuclear physicist whose son is kidnapped by terrorists who demand the H-bomb formula.

Screenwriter Sydney Boehm was nominated for the Academy Award for Best Writing (Story and Screenplay).

== Plot ==
Physicist Frank Addison and his wife Martha live in Los Alamos, New Mexico, where he performs top-secret work. Their young son Tommy accompanies school mates to a carnival in Santa Fe with their teacher, Ellen Haskell. During a puppet show, Tommy disappears, and his absence is not noticed until his name is announced as the winner of a raffle at the end of the show.

Frank and Martha fear the worst and receive a ransom note assembled with words clipped from different newspapers. They also receive a phone call warning them to remain silent.

Ellen passes along her concerns to her boyfriend, FBI agent Russ Farley, who begins tailing the Addisons. When a kidnapper instructs Frank to steal a file from the atomic lab and mail it to a Los Angeles hotel, Frank wants to inform the authorities, but Martha fears for their boy.

Small-time thief David Rogers collects an envelope with the file at a post office, but the FBI is alerted. Rogers attends a baseball game, followed by FBI agents who ask the television cameras to focus and zoom on him. After the game, his car explodes, killing him. However, Rogers no longer has the envelope. The FBI men watch the film footage, presuming that Rogers had passed the file to someone at the game. Watching the footage, the FBI men spot a hot-dog vendor who is actually Donald Clark, a man with communist ties. The FBI bring him in but are limited in what they can extract. Frank is left alone with Clark and physically assaults him to force him to reveal Tommy's location.

Tommy is moved by his kidnappers to the Puye Cliff Dwellings, led by physicist Peter Rassett, and they briefly encounter the Fenton family. Rassett studies the file that Frank has mailed and deems it a fake. Rassett orders the boy killed, but Tommy has escaped and is hiding in a cave.

The Fentons' son finds Tommy's raffle ticket at the ruins and tries to exchange it for the raffle prize at the carnival in Santa Fe. FBI agents ask where the ticket was found, receiving the vital clue to Tommy's location. Agents rush to the site, where Rassett is arrested after killing his accomplices and Tommy is saved.

== Cast ==
- Gene Barry as Dr. Frank Addison
- Lydia Clarke as Martha Addison
- Michael Moore as Russ Farley
- Nancy Gates as Ellen Haskell
- Lee Aaker as Tommy Addison
- Milburn Stone as Insp. Harold Mann
- Bert Freed as Emil Jablons
- Frank Cady as F.B.I. Agent George Weinberg
- Houseley Stevenson Jr. as "Greg" Gregson
- Leonard Strong as Donald Clark
- Jerry Hausner as John Pattiz
- John Damler as Dr. Peter Rassett
- George Lynn as Robert Kalnick
- Olan Soule as Mortie Fenton
- Anthony Warde as Arnie Molter

== Production ==
The Atomic City is the first feature film allowed to be shot in Los Alamos during the period when the entire community was closed to the public at large. It includes views at the main entrance gate (including a scene inside the building) and within laboratory buildings (with faces of workers redacted). Filming also took place at the Puye Cliff Dwellings.

== Reception ==
In a contemporary review for The New York Times, critic Bosley Crowther wrote:

Paramount has got a "sleeper'—a low-budget, high-voltage film—in its new "The Atomic City" ... Streamlined and realistic in its feverish telling of a tale of the rescue of a small son of a Los Alamos physicist who has been kidnapped by H-bomb spies, this trim little piece of melodrama wastes no time on solemn messages. It is made for suspense and excitement, and those are what it gives. ... But it is a tow-headed youngster named Lee Aaker who runs away with the show—at the end, at least, when he is struggling to escape from the kidnapping spies. If this little fellow doesn't pull you right off the edge of your chair, which is where you should most of the time be sitting, then we'll miss our guess about this film.
