= Jeopardy (film) =

1953 film by John Sturges

- Theatrical release poster
- Directed by: John Sturges
- Screenplay by: Mel Dinelli
- Based on: "A Question of Time" (radio play) by Maurice Zimm
- Produced by: Sol Baer Fielding
- Starring: Barbara Stanwyck; Barry Sullivan; Ralph Meeker
- Cinematography: Victor Milner
- Edited by: Newell P. Kimlin
- Music by: Dimitri Tiomkin
- Distributed by: Metro-Goldwyn-Mayer
- Release date: March 30, 1953 (United States)
- Running time: 69 minutes
- Country: United States
- Language: English
- Budget: $589,000
- Box office: $1,615,000

Jeopardy is a 1953 American crime drama directed by John Sturges. The black-and-white film stars Barbara Stanwyck and Barry Sullivan as a married couple, and Ralph Meeker as an escaped convict. The film was based on the 22-minute radio play "A Question of Time".

Award-winning cinematographer Victor Milner, in addition to photographing the film, has a bit part in the movie.

Dana Point, California stands in for the Mexican fishing cove that is the setting of the film. The decrepit pier was demolished before construction of Dana Point harbor began in 1966.

A portion of the film was shot in Pioneertown, and features footage of the "cantina" building that now houses Pappy & Harriet's.

== Plot ==
Americans Doug and Helen Stilwin and their young son, Bobby, embark on a vacation driving across the border into desolate Baja California in Mexico to a remote fishing spot along the coast that Doug used to frequent with his old military buddies.

Upon arrival at the remote beach, young Bobby goes exploring out onto a precarious, rotting pier, high above the water. His foot gets stuck in a crack between boards. After Doug frees him, they start back, but part of the wharf collapses, and a wooden piling falls on Doug's leg, trapping him on the beach just as the tide starts coming in. Helen tries to lift the piling with their car jack, but it breaks. Doug sends her for a rope or help at a deserted gas station they stopped at earlier. He estimates they have four hours before he drowns in the rising surf. sly Helen speeds away in the family car. Helen reaches the gas station the family had stopped in previously and finds rope. A man, Lawson, appears. Helen explains her predicament, and he gets in the car. Hidden out of her sight, however, is a dead man. It soon becomes clear that Lawson has no interest in helping her husband, he is a dangerous escaped convict. He finds Doug's pistol in the glove compartment. When they spot a police car approaching, Lawson makes her drive and pretends to be asleep. He threatens to kill her if she betrays him.

Meanwhile, a fishing boat passes by the beach, but too far away for Doug and Bobby's shouts for help to be understood. A crewman thinks they are just friendly tourists and the boat sails away.

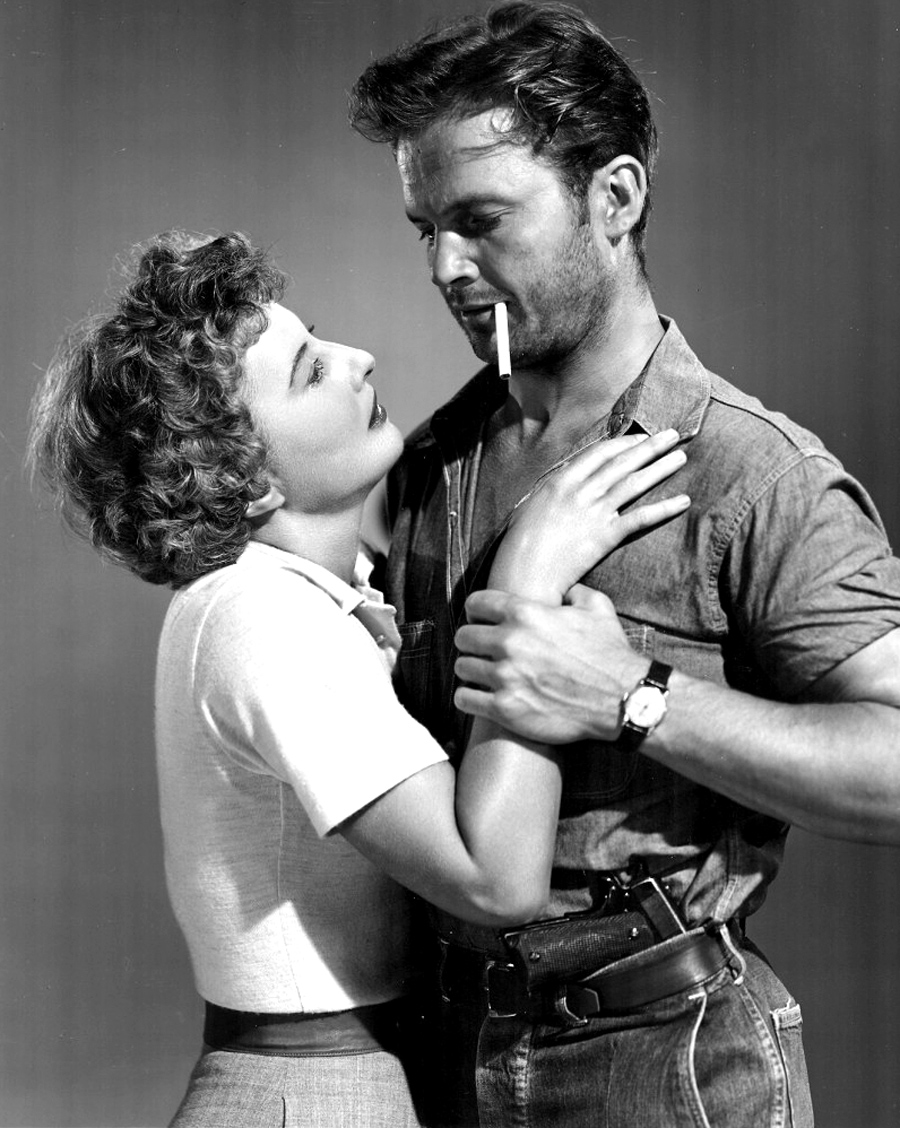
Helen alone with Lawson

Lawson runs through a police roadblock and eventually blows out a tire. As he changes the tire, Helen tries to hit him but he is too alert. Another police car pursues them, but Lawson drives it off the road, flipping it. Lawson hides out in an abandoned house to wait for the police to pass. While waiting there, Helen tells him she will do "anything" to save her husband. Lawson kisses her several times. Helen points out that he will need to change his clothes, his shirt has a prisoner number on the back and he left his jacket behind while fleeing the police. She says he is about the same size as her husband and he could also take Doug's identification. She would go along to corroborate his disguise. Lawson is convinced and drives to the beach. He ties the rope to the fallen piling and the car bumper, then tries to pull it loose without success. He then decides to leave but Helen refuses to give up. Lawson comes up with another idea. He uses a plank to wedge the piling off Doug, saving his life.

Helen offers to hold up her end of the bargain and leave with Lawson but he decides to go on alone. Then he sees the car has another flat tire as a police siren is heard. Helen shakes hands with Lawson before he flees on foot down the coast. When the police drive up Helen does not tell them about Lawson.

== Cast ==
- Barbara Stanwyck as Helen Stilwin
- Barry Sullivan as Doug Stilwin
- Ralph Meeker as Lawson
- Lee Aaker as Bobby Stilwin

== Reception ==
=== Box office ===
According to MGM records, the film earned $1,206,000 in the U.S. and Canada and $409,000 in other markets, resulting in a profit of $264,000.

=== Critical response ===
Film critic Dennis Schwartz gave the film a positive review, writing "John Sturges (Joe Kidd / Ice Station Zebra / Bad Day at Black Rock / The Magnificent Seven / Gunfight at the O.K. Corral / The Great Escape) directs with his usual aplomb this slick family vacation horror story, viewed as a tense psychological thriller...Sturges, always the master craftsman, got the most he could have from this routine thriller. The modestly budgeted film turned into a surprise box-office hit for MGM."
