= Ray Boyle =

American film and television actor (1923–2022)

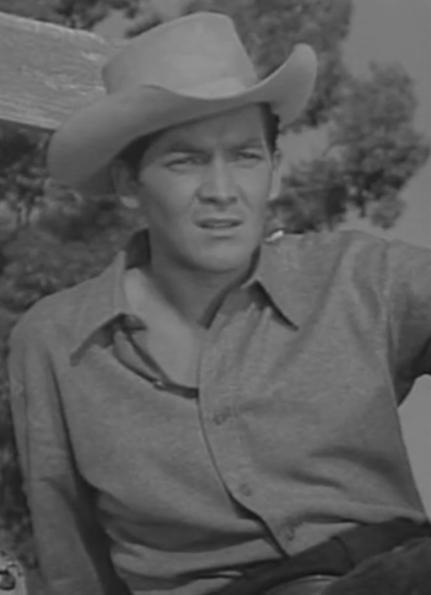
- Boyle in The Mickey Rooney Show, 1954
- Born: Raymond Cornelius Boyle; June 28, 1923; Lisbon, North Dakota, U.S.
- Died: January 6, 2022 (aged 98); Burbank, California, U.S.
- Other name: Dirk London
- Occupations: Film and television actor
- Years active: 1952–2022
- Spouse: Jan Shepard (m. 1954)
- Children: 1

Raymond Cornelius Boyle (June 28, 1923 – January 6, 2022), known professionally as Dirk London and Ray Boyle, was an American film and television actor. He was best known for playing Wyatt Earp's brother Morgan Earp in the American western television series The Life and Legend of Wyatt Earp.

== Life and career ==
Boyle was born in Lisbon, North Dakota, the son of Cornelius Hugh Boyle and Elma Mae Harrison. He served in the United States Marine Corps during World War II, training at Marine Corps Base Camp Pendleton. After his discharge, he worked as a model. He began his screen career in 1952, appearing in the film Zombies of the Stratosphere. In the same year, he appeared in the television programs The Web, Celanese Theatre, Gang Busters, Rocky King Detective and Captain Video and His Video Rangers. In 1954, he played as Bruce Matthews in an episode of the western television series Death Valley Days.

Later in his career, in 1956, Boyle starred as Wyatt Earp's brother Morgan Earp in the ABC western television series The Life and Legend of Wyatt Earp, starring along with Hugh O'Brian, Morgan Woodward, Douglas Fowley and John Anderson. After the series ended in 1961, he guest-starred in numerous television programs including Gunsmoke, Perry Mason, Lawman, The Millionaire, ER, Tales of the Texas Rangers, Harbor Command, Navy Log, The Adventures of Rin Tin Tin and Highway Patrol. He also appeared in films such as Ride Clear of Diablo, Prisoner of War, Return from the Sea and The Bridges at Toko-Ri. During his screen career, he ran an actors' workshop, and was a production designer for two films.

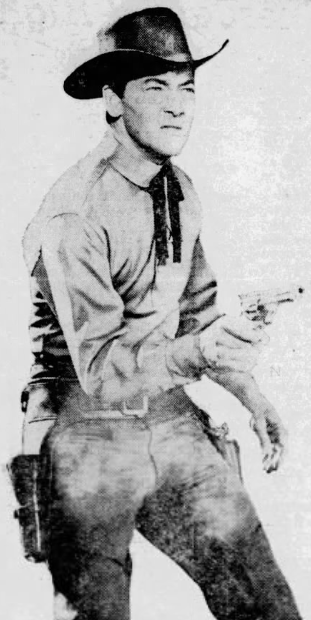
Boyle as Morgan Earp in The Life and Legend of Wyatt Earp, 1961

Boyle retired from acting in 1995, last appearing in the Fox teen drama television series Beverly Hills, 90210. After retiring from acting, in 1996, he appeared in the syndicated comedy television talk show Night Stand with Dick Dietrick.

== Personal life and death ==
In 1951, Boyle met actress Jan Shepard. They married on February 6, 1954. Their marriage lasted until Boyle's death in 2022. His wife Shepard died in 2025.

Boyle died on January 6, 2022, in Burbank, California, at the age of 98. He was buried at San Fernando Mission Cemetery.
