= Lee Aaker =

American actor (1943–2021)

- Aaker in 1956
- Born: Lee William Aaker; September 25, 1943; Los Angeles, California, U.S.
- Died: April 1, 2021 (aged 77); Maricopa County, Arizona, U.S.
- Occupations: Actor; producer; carpenter; ski instructor
- Years active: 1951–1963 (actor)
- Spouse: Sharon Ann Hamilton (m. 1969; div. 1971)

Lee William Aaker (September 25, 1943 – April 1, 2021) was an American former child actor, producer, carpenter, and ski instructor known for his appearance as Rusty of "B-Company" in the 1950s television program The Adventures of Rin Tin Tin. He was the final surviving cast member of the series. In 1952, Aaker appeared in Desperate Search with Howard Keel and Keenan Wynn.

== Early years ==
Aaker was born to DeForest LeRoy Aaker and Dorothy Dean Baker. His mother later married Myles Wilbour in Los Angeles on January 19, 1951. She was the owner of a Los Angeles dance school. (Another source says that she "ran a children's theatre academy" and that when Aaker was 4, she had him "singing and dancing at local clubs.") Lee Aaker had an elder brother, Dee Aaker (born 1941), also a child actor.

== Film ==
Aaker appeared on television as a young child, and landed uncredited roles in motion pictures beginning at age eight, in films such as The Greatest Show on Earth (1952) and High Noon (1952). He quickly moved to featured status by the end of that year. He played the kidnapped "Red Chief" in a segment of the film O. Henry's Full House (1952) and another kidnap victim as the son of scientist Gene Barry in The Atomic City (1952). In 1953, Aaker co-starred in the John Wayne western classic Hondo (1953), as the curious blond son of homesteader Geraldine Page. He also appeared in other film styles such as the film noir thriller Jeopardy (1953) with Barbara Stanwyck, the horse opera drama Arena (1953) with Gig Young, and the comedies Mister Scoutmaster (1953) with Clifton Webb and Ricochet Romance (1954) with Marjorie Main.

== Television ==
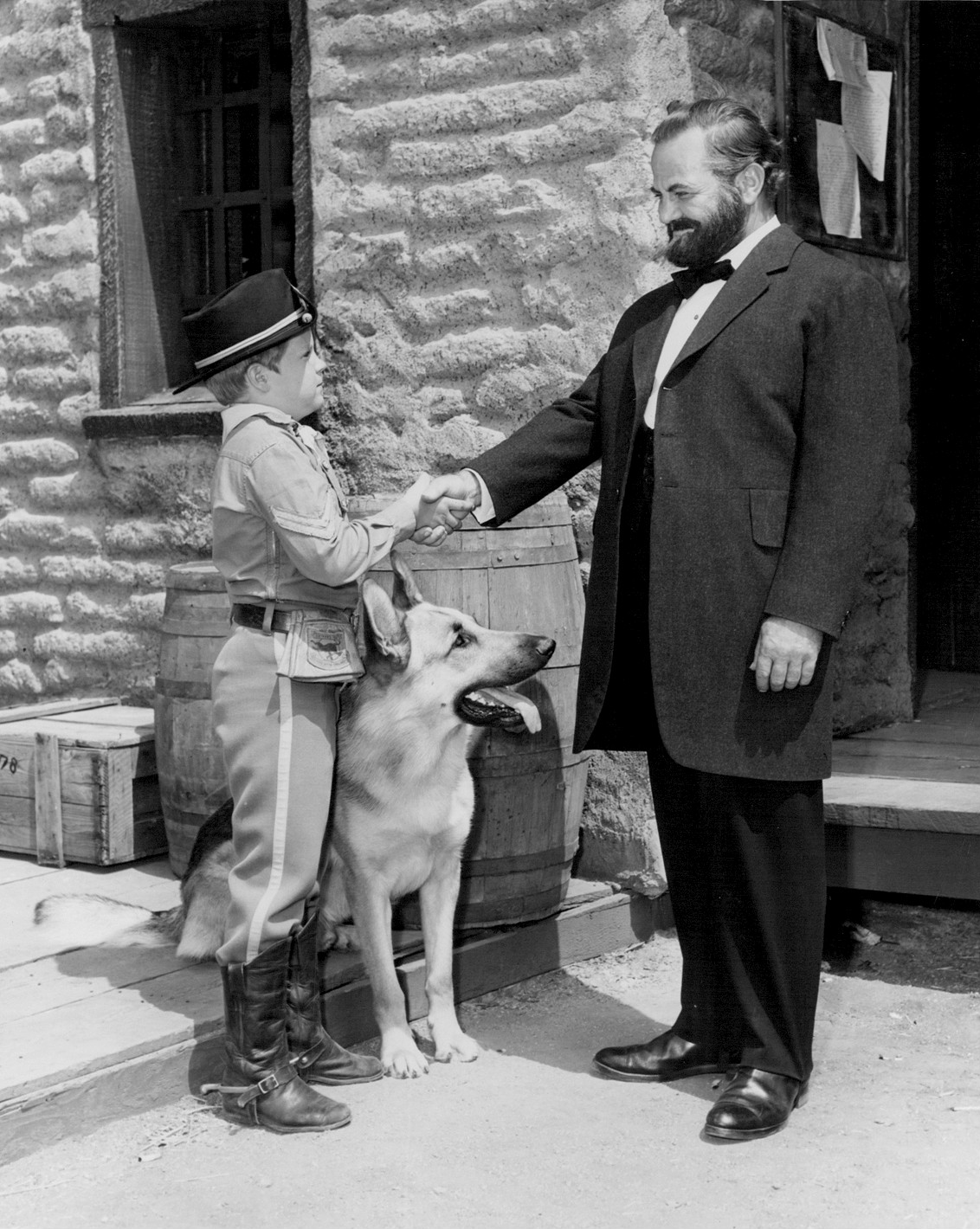
Lee Aaker, Rin Tin Tin and Paul Birch (1956)

In 1953–54, Aaker was among the many child actors who auditioned for the role of "Jeff Miller" on the original 1954 Lassie series, which later aired as Jeff's Collie. That role went to Tommy Rettig. Two weeks later, Aaker won the role of "Rusty" on The Adventures of Rin-Tin-Tin, co-starring James Brown (1920–1992) as Lieutenant Ripley "Rip" Masters.

Aaker and Rettig were friends, and both shows were popular with audiences. The two actors and the two star dogs appeared together in a photograph used on the cover of the July 2, 1955 issue of TV Guide.

== Later years ==
Aaker told a newspaper reporter that when he reached the age of 21, he was paid a $10,000 lump sum (equivalent to $103,800 in 2025) by the studio that produced Rin Tin Tin "and he spent the rest of the '60s traveling around the world 'as sort of a flower child.'" Unable to find work as an adult actor, Aaker got involved as a producer and later worked as a carpenter.

== Personal life and death ==
In the late 1960s, Aaker was married to Sharon Ann Hamilton for two years. He resided in Mammoth Lakes, California, for many years and was the first adaptive sports instructor for Disabled Sports Eastern Sierra at Mammoth Mountain.

According to Paul Petersen, an advocate for former child actors, Aaker experienced poverty toward the end of his life, and had struggled for years with substance abuse. Petersen said Aaker had suffered a stroke and died in Maricopa County, Arizona, near the city of Mesa, on April 1, 2021, and was listed as an "indigent decedent". Petersen was arranging Aaker's burial. As a US Air Force veteran of the Vietnam War, Aaker was buried at the National Memorial Cemetery of Arizona in Phoenix.

== Recognition ==
In 2005, Aaker won the Golden Boot Award as Kids of the West.

== Filmography ==
=== Film ===
| Year | Title | Role | Notes |
|---|---|---|---|
| 1951 | Benjy | Benjy | |
| 1952 | The Greatest Show on Earth | Boy | Uncredited |
| 1952 | Something to Live For | Alternate Boy | Uncredited |
| 1952 | My Son John | Boy | Scenes deleted |
| 1952 | No Room for the Groom | Donovan | |
| 1952 | High Noon | Boy | Uncredited |
| 1952 | The Atomic City | Tommy Addison | |
| 1952 | O. Henry's Full House | J. B. Dorset aka Red Chief (The Ransom of Red Chief) | |
| 1952 | Desperate Search | Don Heldon | |
| 1952 | Hans Christian Andersen | Little Boy | Uncredited |
| 1953 | Jeopardy | Bobby Stilwin | |
| 1953 | Take Me to Town | Corney Hall | |
| 1953 | Arena | Teddy Hutchins | |
| 1953 | Mister Scoutmaster | Arthur | |
| 1953 | A Lion Is in the Streets | Johnny Briscoe | Uncredited |
| 1953 | Hondo | Johnny Lowe | |
| 1954 | Ride Clear of Diablo | Boy | Uncredited |
| 1954 | The Raid | Larry's Friend | Uncredited |
| 1954 | Her Twelve Men | Michael Elliott | Uncredited |
| 1954 | Ricochet Romance | Timmy Williams | |
| 1954 | Destry | Eli Skinner | |
| 1954 | Black Tuesday | Little Boy | Uncredited |
| 1957 | The Challenge of Rin Tin Tin | Rusty | |
| 1963 | Bye Bye Birdie | Student leader | |

=== Television ===
| Year | Title | Role | Notes |
|---|---|---|---|
| 1952 | Your Jeweler's Showcase | | Episode: "Teacher of the Year" |
| 1953 | Fireside Theatre | Sandy | Episode: "The Boy Down the Road" |
| 1953–1954 | The Ford Television Theatre | Tony Evans / Joey | 3 episodes |
| 1953–1955 | Letter to Loretta | Jimmy Preston / Myron | 2 episodes |
| 1954 | Schlitz Playhouse of Stars | | Episode: "Pearl-Handled Guns" |
| 1954 | General Electric Theater | Tim Kelly | Episode: "Wild Luke's Boy" |
| 1954–1959 | The Adventures of Rin Tin Tin | Rusty | 164 episodes |
| 1955 | The Adventures of Spin and Marty on Walt Disney Presents | Russell | |
| 1955 | The Lone Ranger | Tommy Righter | Episode: "The School Story" |
| 1955 | Screen Directors Playhouse | Cowhide | Episode: "The Brush Roper" |
| 1956–1957 | The Ford Show, Starring Tennessee Ernie Ford | (two Christmas episodes, with Rin Tin Tin) | |
| 1957 | Tales of the 77th Bengal Lancers | Govinda | Episode: "The Glass Necklace" |
| 1959 | The Millionaire | Tommy Spencer | Episode: "Millionaire Henry Banning" |
| 1959 | Rescue 8 | Billy | Episode: "Runaway" |
| 1959–1961 | The Donna Reed Show | Walter the Wizard / Kenny | 2 episodes |
| 1959–1962 | Disneyland | Willy / Chuck Taylor | 4 episodes |
| 1960 | Make Room For Daddy | Charles Crane | Episode: "Rusty Meets Little Lord Fauntleroy" |
| 1963 | The Lucy Show | Cadet Blake | Episode: "Lucy and the Military Academy" |
