= Alaska Seas =

1954 film by Jerry Hopper

- Directed by: Jerry Hopper
- Written by: Walter Doniger; Daniel Mainwairing
- Produced by: Mel Epstein
- Starring: Robert Ryan; Brian Keith; Jan Sterling; Gene Barry
- Cinematography: William C. Mellor
- Edited by: Archie Marshek
- Production company: Paramount Pictures
- Distributed by: Paramount Pictures
- Release date: January 27, 1954
- Running time: 78 minutes
- Country: United States
- Language: English

Alaska Seas is a 1954 American adventure film directed by Jerry Hopper and starring Robert Ryan and Brian Keith. The supporting cast features Jan Sterling, Gene Barry and Aaron Spelling. The picture is a loose remake of the 1938 film Spawn of the North, which had starred George Raft, Henry Fonda and John Barrymore.

== Plot ==
Matt Kelly is released from jail and skips town in his boat without paying outstanding storage fees. Back in his home town he is hired by his old friend Jim Kimmerly, the head of the local salmon fishermen who have formed a canning co-operative. The fishermen are battling against an organised gang who are robbing the fishing traps. Matt however, short on cash, joins the raiders.

Jim, unaware of Kelly's duplicity, keeps covering for him amongst the other fishermen. Furthermore, Kelly has his eyes upon Jim's fiancée, Nicki. Kelly's recklessness eventually causes the loss of Kimmerly's fishing boat in a glacier avalanche. He tries to make amends for his misdemeanours in an act of self-sacrifice.

== Cast ==
- Robert Ryan as Matt Kelly
- Brian Keith as Jim Kimmerly
- Jan Sterling as Nicki Jackson
- Gene Barry as Verne Williams
- Richard Shannon as Tom Erickson
- Ralph Dumke as Dad Jackson
- Ross Bagdasarian, Sr. as Joe
- Timothy Carey as Wycroff
- Peter Coe as Greco
- Jim Hayward as The jailer
- Aaron Spelling as The knifer
- William Fawcett as The silversmith

== Production ==
Van Heflin was meant to star alongside Ryan and Jan Sterling. He pulled out just before filming and he was replaced by Brian Keith, who was playing another part. Gene Barry stepped into Keith's old role.
