= Jan Shepard =

American actress (1928–2025)

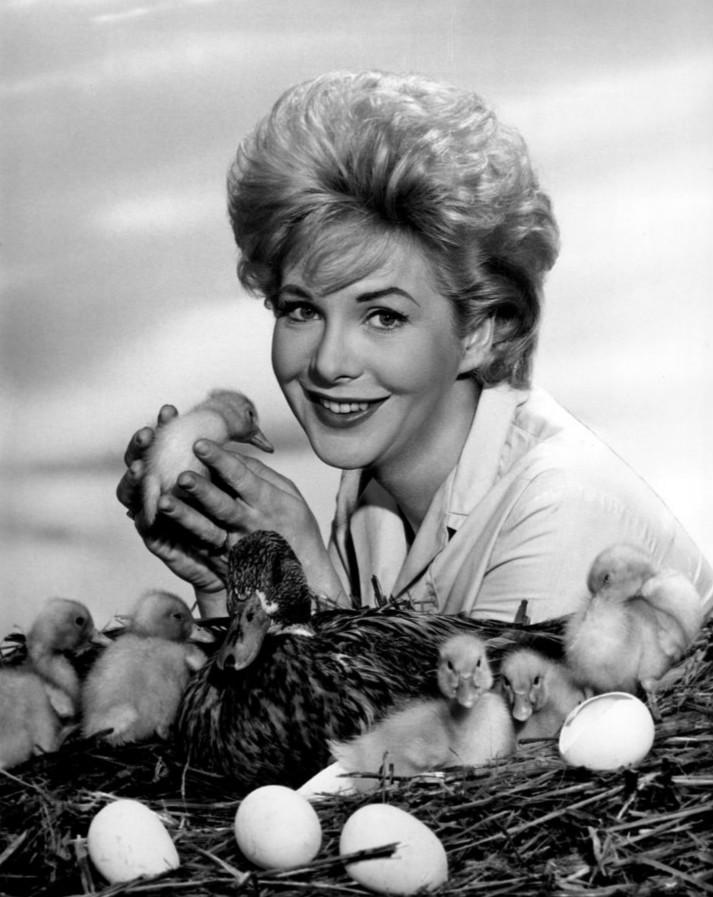
- Jan Shepard in 1963
- Born: Josephine Angela Sorbello; March 19, 1928; Quakertown, Pennsylvania, U.S.
- Died: January 17, 2025 (aged 96); Burbank, California, U.S.
- Occupation: Actress
- Years active: 1954–2017
- Spouse: Ray Boyle (m. 1954; died. 2022)
- Children: 1

Josephine Angela Sorbello (March 19, 1928 – January 17, 2025), known professionally as Jan Shepard, was an American actress.

== Early years ==
Josephine Angela Sorbello was born in Quakertown, Pennsylvania, on March 19, 1928, to parents of Sicilian descent, Mr. and Mrs. Sam Sorbello. She was valedictorian of her class at Quakertown High School, and acted in plays produced locally.

== Career ==
Shepard honed her acting skills at the Pasadena Playhouse. She appeared in the films Sabre Jet, as well as King Creole (1958) and Paradise, Hawaiian Style (1966) with Elvis Presley, thus before and after his Army induction and his mother's death. She played Nurse Betty in the syndicated television series Dr. Christian and appeared in the television series Waterfront, Bat Masterson, The Man Behind the Badge, Tales of the Texas Rangers, Private Secretary, Dr. Christian, Rawhide, Laramie, Perry Mason, Highway Patrol, Gunsmoke, Tombstone Territory, The High Chaparral and The Virginian, among others.

== Personal life and death ==
In 1951, Shepard met actor Ray Boyle. They married in 1954, and remained together until Boyle's death in 2022. Shepard died from pneumonia at Providence St. Joseph Medical Center, in Burbank, California, on January 17, 2025. She was 96.

== Filmography ==
=== Television ===
Year	Title	Role	Notes
1959	Wanted Dead or Alive	Lilith Preston	Season 2 Episode 17 "Mental Lapse"
1964	Gunsmoke	Marge	Season 9 Episode 17 "Friend"
1965	Bonanza	Sally	Season 7 Episode 21 "The Code"

1962

  ' ' [Perry Mason (1957 TV series)|Perry Mason TV series)]]
  Joanne Proctor
  Season 6 Episode 2 "The Case of the Capricious Corpse" 

1964

 ‘ ‘ [Perry Mason (1957 TV series)|Perry Mason TV series)]]
 Margaret Foster
 Season 8 Episode 2 “The Case of the Paper Bullets”

1965

 ‘ ‘ [Perry Mason (1957 TV series)|Perry Mason TV series)]]
 Marge Leonard
 Season 9 Episode 10 “The Case of the Runaway Racer”
