= Gene Barry =

American actor (1919–2009)

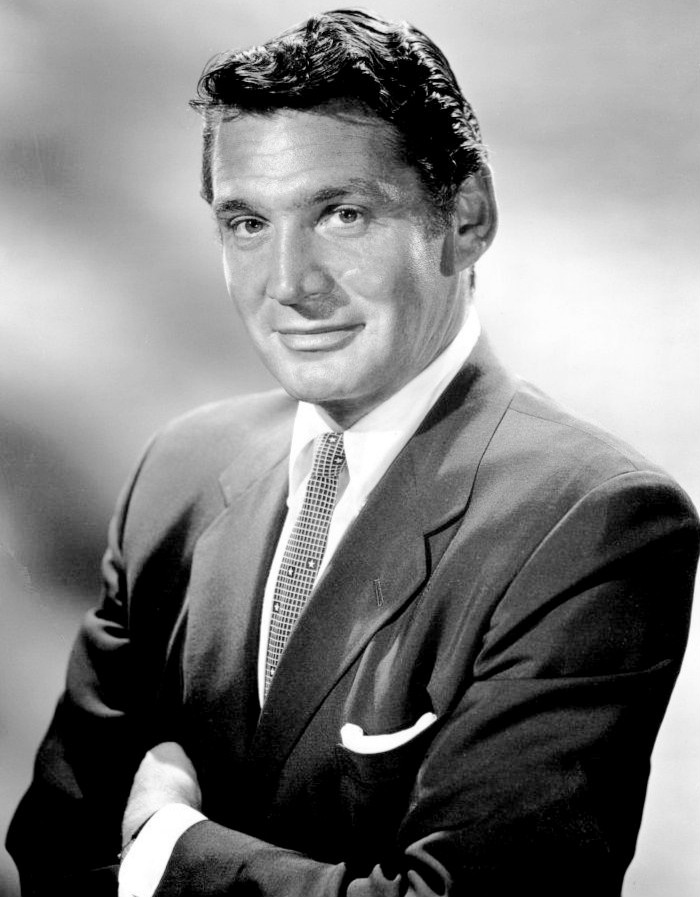
- Barry in 1959
- Born: Eugene Klass; June 14, 1919; New York City, U.S.
- Died: December 9, 2009 (aged 90); Los Angeles, California, U.S.
- Resting place: Hillside Memorial Park, Culver City
- Occupations: Actor, singer
- Years active: 1942–2005
- Spouse: Betty Claire Kalb (m. 1944; died 2003)
- Children: 3

Gene Barry (born Eugene Klass; June 14, 1919 – December 9, 2009) was an American stage, screen, and television actor and singer. Barry is best remembered for his leading roles in the films The Atomic City (1952) and The War of the Worlds (1953) and for his portrayal of the title characters in the TV series Bat Masterson and Burke's Law, among many roles.

== Early life ==
Barry was born Eugene Klass on June 14, 1919, in New York City, the son of Eva (née Conn) and Martin Klass; all of his grandparents were Jewish immigrants from Latvia and Poland. Barry grew up in New York City and attended New Utrecht High School in the borough of Brooklyn. Barry exhibited early artistic skills with singing and playing violin as a child and later spent two years at the Chatham Square School of Music in Greenwich Village on a scholarship awarded for his vocal ability.

== Career ==
Barry chose his professional name in honor of John Barrymore and made his Broadway debut as Captain Paul Duval in the 1942 revival of Sigmund Romberg's The New Moon. He later portrayed Falke in Rosalinda (1942), Nova Kovich in The Merry Widow (1943), Lieutenant Bunin in Catherine Was Great (1944), Dorante and Comte De Chateau-Gaillard in The Would-Be Gentleman (1946),The Doctor in Happy as Larry (1950), and played a variety of roles in the musical revue Bless You All (1950).

In 1950 Barry began appearing on television with the NBC Television Opera Theatre. In 1955 he appeared on the CBS Television anthology series Appointment with Adventure.

In 1951 Barry was hired for his first movie, in the role of Dr. Frank Addison in The Atomic City (1952). In 1953 he was cast as Dr. Clayton Forrester in the science fiction film The War of the Worlds (1953). (Much later, Barry also made a cameo appearance along with his co-star Ann Robinson from the film of 1953, in Steven Spielberg's remake of War of the Worlds (2005).

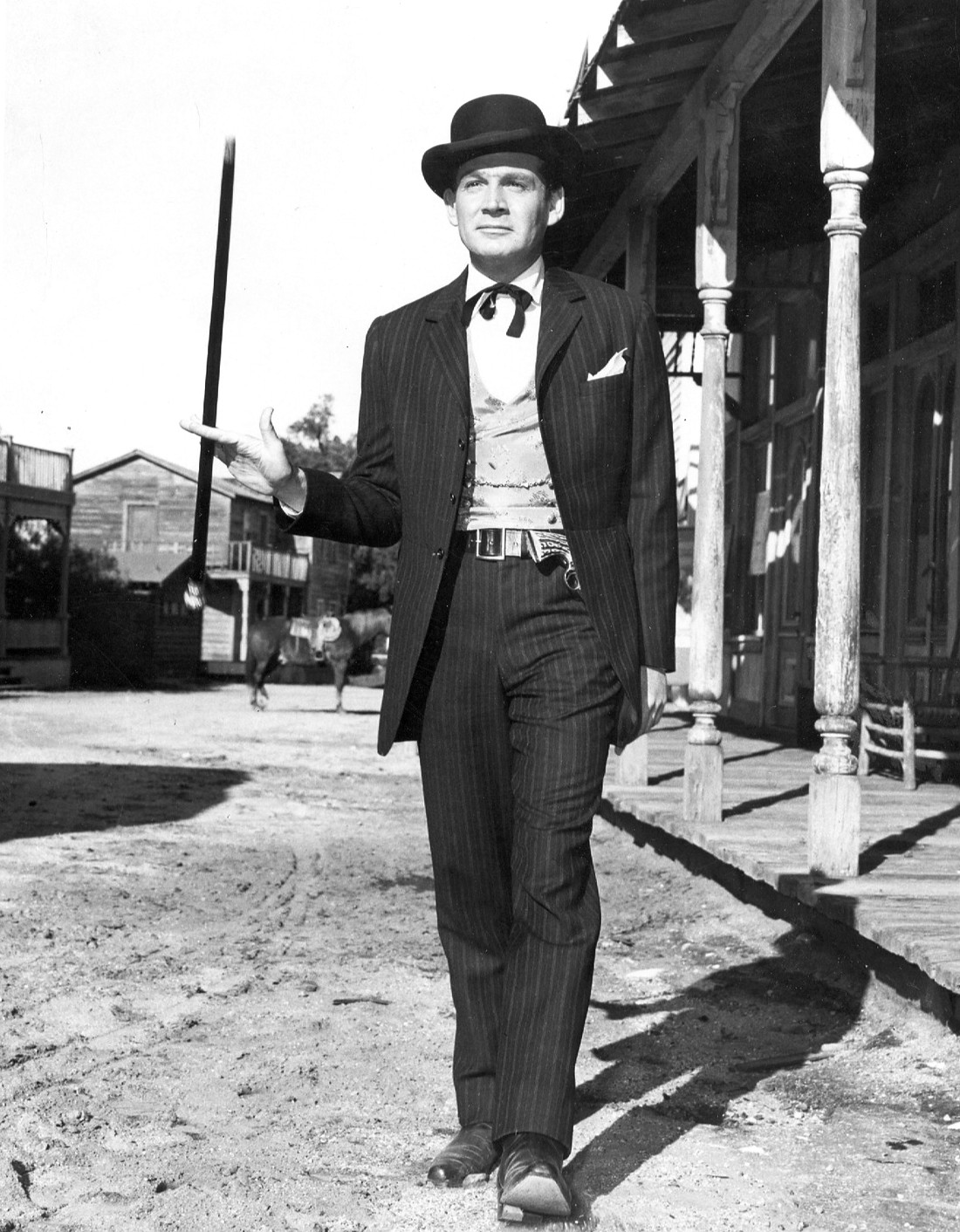
Gene Barry as Bat Masterson

Barry was cast in a recurring role as the physical education teacher Gene Talbot, the new romantic interest of series star Eve Arden, in the situation comedy Our Miss Brooks (1955).

He portrayed a fictionalized recounting of the life of the real-life U.S. Marshal, gambler, and gunman Masterson, his life as a writer and bon vivant occurred long after the time-frame featured in the series, in NBC-TV's Bat Masterson (1958–1961). In 1990, Barry recreated the role of Bat Masterson for two episodes of Guns of Paradise, along with Hugh O'Brian as Wyatt Earp and the following year in The Gambler Returns: The Luck of the Draw (1991).

In his next TV series, Barry played a millionaire homicide investigator who was chauffeured in his Rolls-Royce as he solved crimes. This series was broadcast on ABC-TV in Burke's Law, (1963–65). For his performance in it, Barry won the Golden Globe Award for Best Actor in 1965. In 1965–66, the final season of the series, the title of the show changed to Amos Burke, Secret Agent. In 1994, a revival of the Burke's Law series returned to television for two seasons on CBS. Barry again played in the title role, this time as a widower working with his son Peter (Peter Barton).

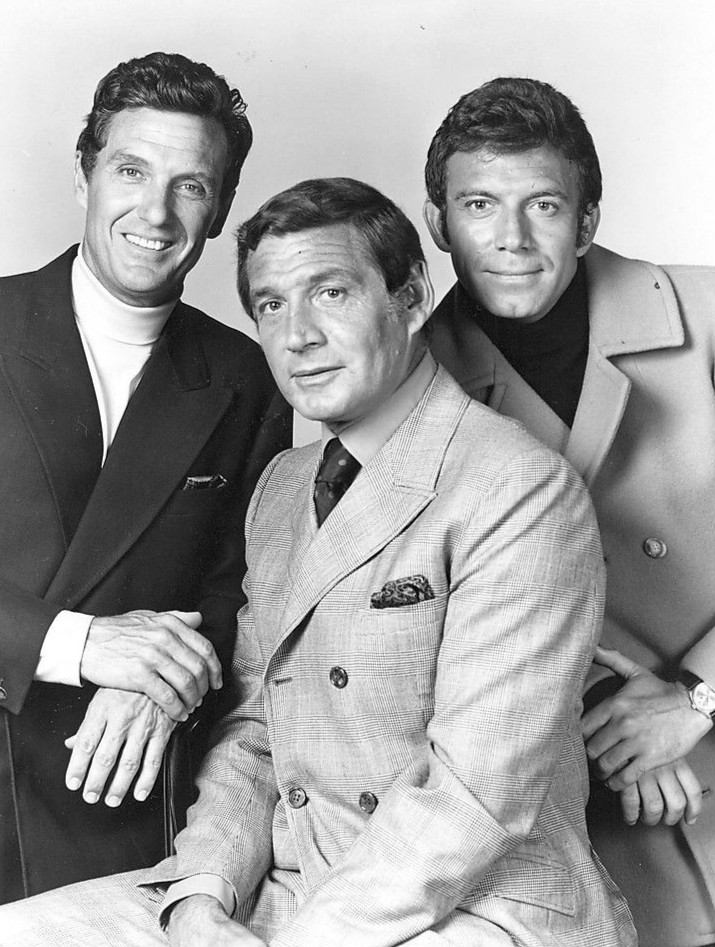
With Robert Stack and Tony Franciosa in The Name of the Game (1968–1971)

Barry's third TV series was The Name of the Game, in which he played the sophisticated publisher of a family of magazines, and was one of three lead characters. The other two lead actors were Robert Stack and Tony Franciosa, who rotated with Barry week by week as the primary character in each week's program. This series was shown by NBC from 1968 to 1971. One of the magazines that Barry's character published was called People, several years before the actual People began publication.

Shortly before the filming of The Name of the Game series began, Barry played the villain—a wealthy psychiatrist in a two-hour TV movie (that became the precursor of the TV series Columbo) in Prescription: Murder.

In 1972, Barry starred in the ITV television series The Adventurer, along with Barry Morse and Catherine Schell. He played Gene Bradley, a government agent of independent means who posed as a glamorous American movie star. Also in 1972, Barry acted in The Second Coming of Suzanne, an avant-garde drama directed by his son Michael and starring Sondra Locke and Paul Sand. He co-financed the film with private backers.

Barry returned to Broadway acting on two occasions—in 1962 in The Perfect Setup and in 1983, in the Broadway premiere of the musical La Cage aux Folles. Barry was nominated for a Tony Award for his portrayal of Georges in Cage.

For his contribution to live theatre, Gene Barry received a star on the Hollywood Walk of Fame at 6555 Hollywood Boulevard. In 1975 Barry bought a home in Palm Springs, California. A Golden Palm Star on the Palm Springs Walk of Stars was dedicated to him in 1994.

== Personal life ==
On October 22, 1944, at age 25, Barry married Betty Claire Kalb (1923–2003), whom he met on the set of Catherine Was Great. Kalb was an actress known by the stage name Julie Carson.

== Death ==
Barry died on December 9, 2009, at Sunrise Senior Living in Woodland Hills, California, at the age of 90. He was buried at the Hillside Memorial Park Cemetery in Culver City, California with his wife Betty, who died in 2003. He outlived Richard Todd, his costar on the movie Subterfuge (1968), by six days.

== Filmography ==
- The Atomic City (1952) – Dr. Frank Addison
- The War of the Worlds (1953) – Dr. Clayton Forrester
- The Girls of Pleasure Island (1953) – Capt. Beaton
- Those Redheads From Seattle (1953, filmed in 3-D) – Johnny Kisco
- Alaska Seas (1954) – Verne Williams
- Red Garters (1954) – Rafael Moreno
- Naked Alibi (1954) – Al Willis
- Soldier of Fortune (1955) – Louis Hoyt
- The Purple Mask (1955) – Capt. Charles Laverne
- The Houston Story (1956) – Frank Duncan
- Back from Eternity (1956) – Jud Ellis
- China Gate (1957) – Sgt. Brock
- The 27th Day (1957) – Jonathan Clark
- Forty Guns (1957) – Wes Bonell
- Thunder Road (1958) – Troy Barrett
- Hong Kong Confidential (1958) – Agent Casey Reed
- Maroc 7 (1967) – Simon Grant
- Subterfuge (1968) – Michael A. Donovan
- The Second Coming of Suzanne (1974) – Jackson Sinclair, the TV Commentator
- Guyana: Crime of the Century (1979) – Congressman Lee O'Brien
- Sahara (1983) – R.J. Gordon
- War of the Worlds (2005) – Grandfather (final film role)

== Television credits ==
- Science Fiction Theatre (1955) – Joe Ferguson
- Our Miss Brooks (1955–1956) – Gene Talbot
- The Jane Wyman Show (1955) (Season 8 Episode 10: “Nailed Down")
- Alfred Hitchcock Presents (1955) (Season 1 Episode 3: "Triggers in Leash") – Del Delaney
- Alfred Hitchcock Presents (1955) (Season 1 Episode 6: "Salvage") - Dan Varrel
- Playhouse 90 – Ain't No Time for Glory (1957) – Lieutenant Roy Koalton
- The Walter Winchell File "The Witness" (1957) – Billy Peterson
- Bat Masterson (1958–1961) – Bat Masterson
- Pete and Gladys as himself in "Crossed Wires" (1961) – Himself
- The Alfred Hitchcock Hour (1963) (Season 1 Episode 30: "Dear Uncle George") – John Chambers / Uncle George
- Burke's Law (1963–1966) – Amos Burke, Secret Agent / Snooky Martinelli
- Columbo: Prescription: Murder (1968)
- Istanbul Express (1968) – Michael London
- The Name of the Game (1968–1971) – Glenn Howard / Will Manning
- Do You Take This Stranger? (1971) – Murray Jarvis
- The Devil and Miss Sarah (1971) – Rankin
- The Adventurer (1972–1973) – Gene Bradley
- Ransom for Alice! (1977) – Harry Darew
- Aspen (1977) (miniseries) – Carl Osborne
- The Feather and Father Gang – "The Apology" (March 7, 1977) – Generalis
- Charlie's Angels – Angels in the Wings (November 23, 1977) – Frank Jason
- A Cry for Love (1980) – Gordon Harris
- The Girl, the Gold Watch & Dynamite (1981) – Andrew Stovall
- The Adventures of Nellie Bly (1981) – John Cockerill
- The Love Boat (1982) – Ted Anderson
- Crazy Like a Fox (1984–1986) – Nicholas Roland
- The Twilight Zone (1987) – Prince of Darkness
- Perry Mason: The Case of the Lost Love (1987) – Glenn Robertson
- My Secret Identity (1988) – Fred Cooper / Captain Noble
- Turn Back the Clock (1989) – John Forrest
- Murder, She Wrote (1989) – Henry Reynard
- The Gambler Returns: The Luck of the Draw (1991) – Bat Masterson
- Burke's Law (1994–1995) – Chief Amos Burke
- These Old Broads (2001) – Mr. Stern
