= East Gate Bel Air, Los Angeles =

East Gate Bel Air
- Neighborhood of Los Angeles
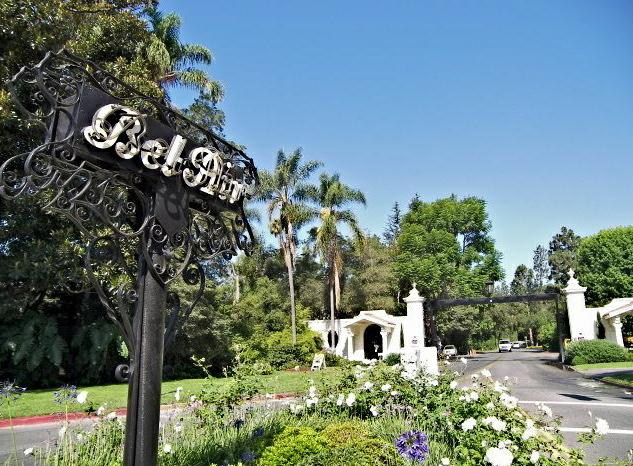
- The East Gate entrance to Bel Air at Beverly Glen and Sunset Blvds.

- Location within Western Los Angeles
- Coordinates: 34.081°N 118.436°W
- Country: United States
- State: California
- County: Los Angeles
- City: Los Angeles

East Gate Bel Air (or Old Bel Air) is a small area within the Bel Air section of Los Angeles, California. It is made up of large, old estates developed mostly before World War II.

== Location ==
As shown in the “Bel Air First Residential Allotment” map from 1923, the original Bel Air tract of East Gate Old Bel Air founded and opened by Alphonzo E. Bell, Sr. was composed of 128 lots on Bel Air Road (which passes north from South Beverly Glen and Sunset Boulevards through the East Gate entrance—and hence the logical East Gate name) and the five roads which branch from it: Saint Pierre, Saint Cloud, Bellagio (to Stone Canyon), Copa De Oro, and Nîmes Roads.

Though many of these 128 lots have since been combined into single properties, this original 1923 Bel Air allotment is what distinguishes East Gate Old Bel Air from the rest of present-day Bel Air, which was gradually added by Bell starting in 1931 with Stone Canyon (known then as Bel Air Woodland), and by 1937 Bel Air extended westward all the way to Sepulveda Boulevard (its westernmost boundary today).

At its southernmost edge (where Copa de Oro Road meets Sunset Boulevard), East Gate Old Bel Air flanks the campus of UCLA. At its easternmost edge, it borders Holmby Hills. This combined contiguous area of East Gate Bel Air and Holmby Hills straddles North Beverly Glen Boulevard (at a bend of Saint Pierre Road and De Neve Square Park).

In general, the further one moves west from Saint Pierre Road to West Gate Lower Bel Air and north from Sunset Boulevard up the Santa Monica Mountains to Upper Bel Air, the smaller and the less flat the building lots and the more varied the styles and price ranges of the homes (with development fueled largely by postwar demand in the 1950s).

== History ==
On the undeveloped hillsides of original Bel Air in 1922, Alphonzo Bell built water and sewage pipes, installed underground electric and telephone lines, and planted thousands of trees along winding streets traversing the hilly terrain. Bell refused to sell the original East Gate Old Bel Air allotments to anyone in the film business, though changed his mind on all of Bel Air with the arrival of the Great Depression.

A design committee has existed to the present day to preserve the architectural harmony of the community, with restrictions including low masses, horizontal lines, pitched roofs, and unobtrusive and harmonious colors, and deed restrictions required land purchasers to spend a minimum of $20,000 on home construction.

== Notable residents ==
- Beny Alagem
- John Anderson (former)
- Stephen Bollenbach (former)
- Sonny Bono and Cher (former)
- Franklin Otis Booth, Jr. (former)
- Bruce Cabot (former)
- Nicolas Cage (former)
- B. Gerald Cantor (former)
- Johnny Carson (former) and Joanna Carson
- Marion Davies (former)
- Mac Davis (former)
- Michael Eisner
- Jay-Z and Beyoncé
- Georgia Frontiere
- Zsa Zsa Gabor (former)
- Judy Garland (former)
- Brad Grey
- Salma Hayek
- Rick Hilton
- Darby Hinton, Daryn Hinton and Ed Hinton (former)
- Alfred Hitchcock (former)
- Alan Horn
- Howard Hughes (former)
- Ray Irani
- Mick Jagger (former)
- Jonas Brothers (former)
- Tom Jones (former)
- Jordan Kerner (former)
- Otto Klemperer (former)
- Carole Lombard (former)
- Jennifer Lopez and Marc Anthony (former)
- Dean Martin (former)
- Louis Mayer (former)
- Colleen Moore (former)
- Bob Newhart (former)
- Jerry Perenchio
- John Phillips (former)
- Tyrone Power, Linda Christian, Romina Power and Taryn Power (former)
- Elvis Presley (former)
- Prince Rainier of Monaco (former)
- Basil Rathbone (former)
- Ronald Reagan and Nancy Reagan (former), 668 St. Cloud Road
- Terry Semel
- Mark Spitznagel
- Elizabeth Taylor (former)
- Cheryl Tiegs
- Sir Peter Ustinov (former)
- Johnny Weissmuller (former)
- Brian Wilson (former; see also Beach Boys Studio)
