= The Ohio Story =

Ohio Story historical radio and TV series

The Ohio Story was a scripted American radio and made-for-television film series broadcast in Ohio from 1947 to 1961. At the time, the series held the record for the longest-running regional scripted program in the nation. When the series ended, 1,309 radio and 175 TV episodes had been produced.

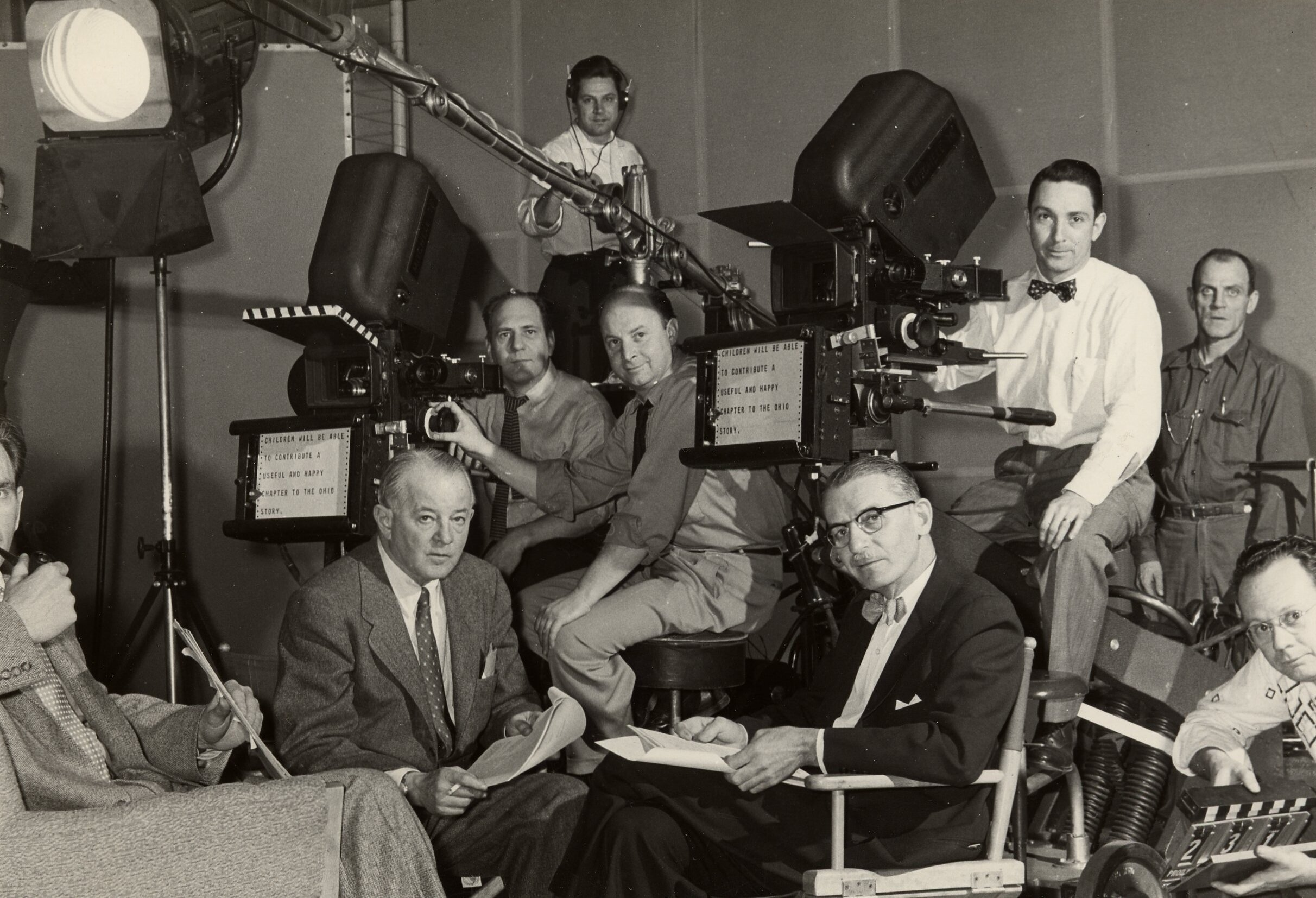
Cinécraft used teleprompters and multi-camera setups to film The Ohio Story television series. Photo courtesy of the Hagley Museum & Library.

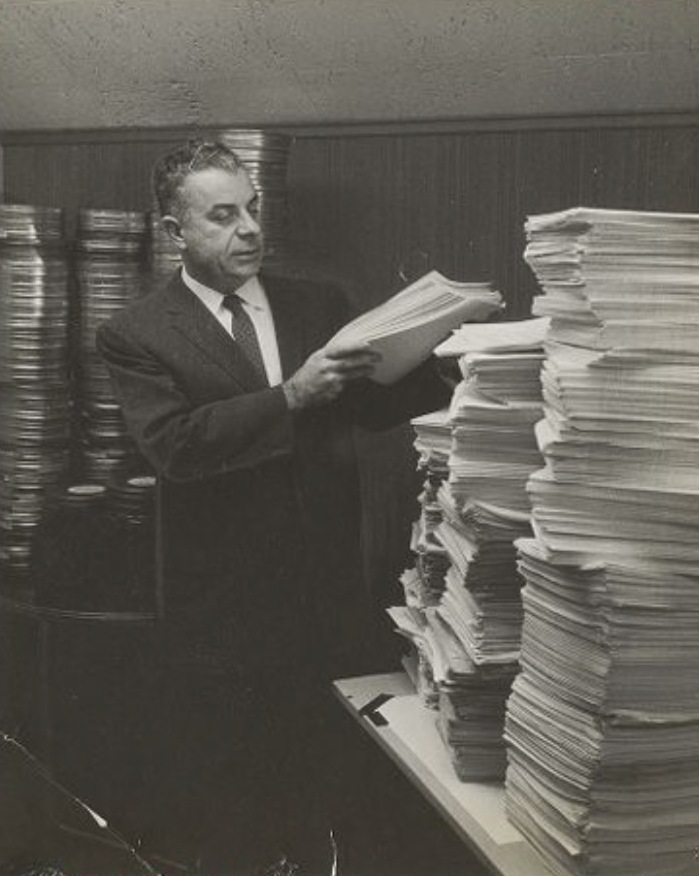
Frank Siedel created The Ohio Story radio and film series and wrote most of the scripts. Photo courtesy of the Hagley Museum & Library.

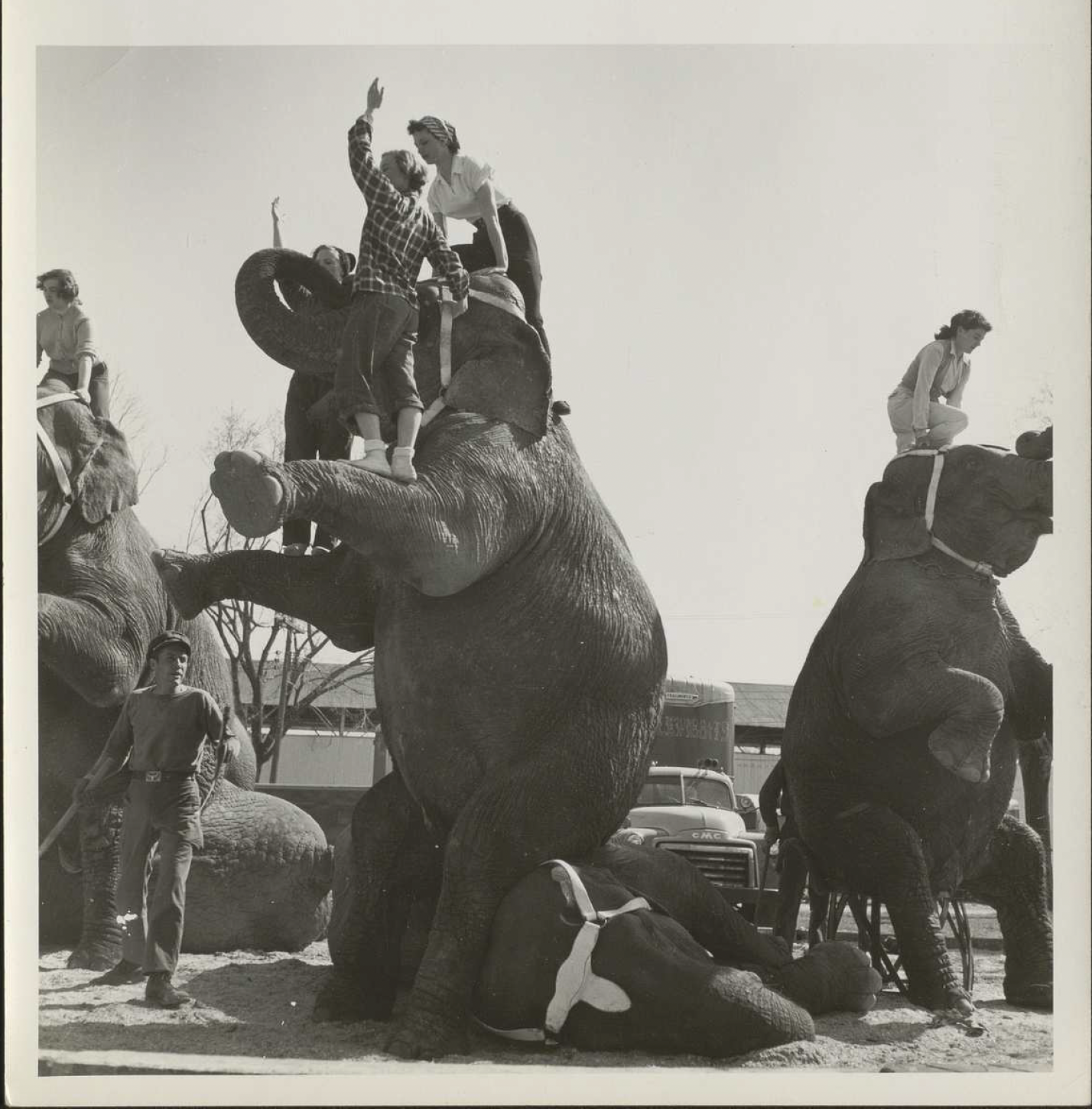
Backstage at the Big Top: A visit to the winter quarters of Ohio's Mills Brothers Circus.1956 Cinécraft production photo. The Ohio Story TV series. Photo courtesy of the Hagley Museum & Library.

The series provided engaging overviews of a variety of local topics that were off the beaten path for many Ohioans. Some episodes provided information on industries and businesses that were significant at the time of recording, but have since faded into obscurity. A number of episodes focused on important people in Ohio history, including sharpshooter and exhibition shooter Annie Oakley; famed African-American poet Paul Laurence Dunbar; the abolitionist and author Harriet Beecher Stowe; President William McKinley; Victoria Claflin Woodhull, the first woman to run for president; Civil War-era financier, Jay Cooke, and cartoonist Milton Caniff.

Frank Siedel created the series and wrote most of the scripts. Scripts were also written by William Ellis, known for his Rivers of America series, Lee Templeton, and Jan Hostetter. Stuart Buchanan of McCann-Erickson Advertising Agency in Cleveland produced the series. Ray Culley of Cinécraft Productions in Cleveland directed the television film series.

The first Ohio Story radio episode, Knowest the Land, aired on January 6, 1947, and introduced what the series would be about.

"The Ohio Story, then, will be a record of achievement, a narrative account of a free and progressive people. Its purpose: to provide good listening, to increase understanding, to promote a respect for the past, an appreciation of the present, and a hope for the future. In the weeks and months to come, we hope to earn a regular welcome into every Ohio home. We promise to be a polite and interesting guest."

Great care was taken to balance the episodes geographically and report carefully. Before each episode was run, the Ohio State Historical Society reviewed the scripts for accuracy.

In an interview with the television & radio editor of the Columbus Evening Dispatch, Siedel was asked how he could possibly come up with so many scripts on Ohio. Siedel said:

"There are nearly 9 million people in Ohio, and every one of them is worth a story. Most of our leads, though, are more obvious. If you keep your eyes open. One of the best leads is the plaques you see in public buildings. Usually, they go unnoticed by the passerby, but they were put up there for a reason. Generally, there's a story behind them."

Siedel cited the bronze locomotive on the wall near the High Street entrance of the Ohio Statehouse. Very few people ever notice it, but Siedel did. It led to his writing a radio and TV episode titled "The General," the story of Andrews' Raiders, a group of Ohioans who stole a locomotive and raised havoc throughout the South during the Civil War. Siedel said the Walt Disney film, The Great Locomotive Chase, was about the same historical event, but the story was first told as an Ohio Story episode.

Siedel loved to tell the Tale of Lottie Moon, a Confederate spy from Ohio. The first time Lottie's story appears is in a 15-minute Ohio Story radio episode broadcast live in 1945. In 1950, Siedel reworked the story for a live June 13, 1950 broadcast of the Cavalcade of America radio show. Lucille Ball read the part of Lottie Moon. Siedel included the tale of Lottie Moon along with a number of Ohio Story episodes in his 1950 book, The Ohio Story. Siedel told the tale one last time in the television version of the programme, The Taming of Lottie Moon, which aired on November 22, 1957.

The Ohio Story and Out of the Midwest, two of Frank Siedel's books, and The Bounty Lands, a book by Bill Ellis, were offshoots of the radio series.

Stuart Buchanan, the series producer, said. "There never has been-or will be-a radio series that commanded the respect and attention of this state or, for that fact, the nation. The Ohio Story reached its peak in the heyday of radio… the late 1940s. Only one show in the nation had a higher rating — that was the Jack Benny Show. I guess of all the things I've done in my lifetime, I'm most proud to have had a hand in developing and producing The Ohio Story."

In later years, Nelson Olmsted, a California-based actor, narrated about 300 radio shows and almost all of the television episodes.

Anson Hardman, General Advertising Manager of Ohio Bell Telephone, coordinated the first five years of the radio series. Ohio Bell sponsored the entire series run and used it to launch many new telephone features.

== The Ohio Story radio series (1947–1955) ==
The Ohio Story radio series
- Written by: Frank Siedel
- Produced by: Stuart Buchanan
- Narrated by: Robert Waldrop; Tom Field
- Music by: Earl Rohlf
- Production companies: WTAM Studio, Cleveland, OH
- Release date: 1947
- Running time: 15 minutes
- Country: United States
- Language: English

The radio series began in 1947 as a three-times-a-week evening radio show broadcast live from the WTAM studios in Cleveland to a statewide network of radio stations.

In 1947, Robert Waldrop left his job as a staff announcer with NBC in New York to become the radio series announcer. Waldrop announced the series for nine years, 1947 to 1955. John Shurtleff, who previously worked on the Jack Benny and Gene Autry radio shows, handled the sound effects for the radio series. Tom Field read the Bell Telephone commercials embedded in the radio episodes.

The radio episodes opened and closed with the Di Provenza score from Verdi's opera La Traviata. Earl Rohlf played the score on a Hammond organ on every live episode for the first five years. After the radio series switched to a pre-recorded format, Rohlf was no longer mentioned in the show credits.

In June 1952, the radio episode format was changed from 15 minutes to 10 minutes a night, and the scripts indicated the shows were pre-recorded instead of broadcast live for distribution over a 26-station network.

A 1953 Ohio Bell press release claimed the radio series earned more awards than any other regional program nationwide.

The last Ohio Story radio episode, Captain Dodge's Uncommon Courage, aired on December 29, 1955.

Although all 1,309 radio scripts are preserved, few recordings of radio episodes have been found. In 2026, Hagley Library posted 40 digitized radio episodes of The Ohio Story on the Hagley digital archive.

== Representative radio episodes ==
No.	Title	Year
37	"THE BLENNERHASSETT CONSPIRACY"	1947
Aaron Burr's scheme to gain world control from a small island on the Ohio River just below Marietta.
38	"SOUND ON PAPER"	1947
The Story of the Brush Development Company of Cleveland. The business was founded in 1919 by Alfred L. Williams as Brush Labs to develop products that used piezoelectric crystals.
41	"PETROLEUM VESUVIUS NASBY"	1947
The story of Toledo newspaperman, David Ross Locke's most famous works, the "Nasby Letters." The letters were written in the character of, and over the signature of, "Rev. Petroleum V(Vesuvius) Nasby", a Copperhead and Democrat, who supported the Confederate cause.
57	"DAN EMMETT AND "DIXIE""	1947
The story of Dan Emmett of Mt. Vernon, Ohio, the Minstrel Man. Emmett is best remembered as the composer of the song "Dixie."
127	"THE GAY CABALLERO"	1947
The story of Frank Crumit of Jackson, Ohio, an American singer, composer, radio entertainer, and vaudeville star. He wrote his most famous song, "Sweet Lady," as a favor to his sister.
178	"THE GOLDEN LAMB INN"	1948
The story of the Golden Lamb Inn. Founded in 1803 and Ohio's oldest hotel, it has a rich history with connections to notable figures like Charles Dickens and Neil Armstrong.
204	"HOMBRE FROM OHIO"	1948
Author Zane Grey of Zanesville. Usually when a writer publishes a book at his own expense, his relatives each buy a copy and that's the last you hear of it but today "Betty Zane" is in its 17th edition and still going strong.
212	"UP FROM THE SOUTH AT BREAK OF DAY"	1948
"Sheridan's Ride" is a famous 1864 poem by Thomas Buchanan Read of Cincinnati that immortalizes Union General Philip Sheridan's dramatic ride to rally his troops at the Battle of Cedar Creek during the Civil War.
283	"THE LAKE ERIE COLLEGE CHOIR"	1948
The story of the Lake Erie College for Women in Painesville, Ohio and the voices of its distinguished musical organization.
286	"FRANK SKELDEN'S ZOO IN TOLEDO"	1948
Under Frank Skeldon's leadership, the Toledo zoo obtained its first gorillas, bred gorillas and orangutans for the first time, and became the first zoo in North America to breed cheetahs.
313	"HAPPY BIRTHDAY TO YOU"	1949
A celebration of The Ohio's Story radio series third year on the air.
316	"RARE BOOK MAN"	1948
Ernest Wessen began collecting books at an early age, and became a prominent antiquarian book dealer during the mid-twentieth century. With a strong interest in Americana, he started the Midland Rare Book Co., in Mansfield, Ohio. Wessen is known for his dealer catalog "Midland Notes," which he published from 1938 to 1969.
322	"KARAMU HOUSE OF CLEVELAND"	1948
Karamu House became nationally known for its dedication to interracial theater and the arts. It was founded in 1915 by two young social workers with the support of the Second Presbyterian Church in Cleveland.
355	"HOT DOG STEVENS"	1948
The story of Harry M. Stevens, the Columbus, Ohio food concessionaire credited with being America's foremost ballpark concessionaire and inventor of the hot dog.
358	"THE BIRTH OF THE MAJORS"	1948
Professional baseball began in 1866 when Aaron Champion decided he wanted to see his favorite athletes, the Cincinnati Red Stockings, win a few ball games. By the 1870 season, the Red Stockings ran their winning streak to 78 victories and one tie in 79 starts - the longest winning streak in baseball history. In 1876, the National League was formed on the professional foundations the Red Stockings had built.

== The Ohio Story television series (1953–1961) ==
The Ohio Story television series
- Directed by: Ray Culley
- Written by: Frank Siedel
- Produced by: Stuart Buchanan
- Starring: Nelson Olmsted
- Narrated by: Nelson Olmsted
- Cinematography: Harry Horrocks
- Production companies: Cinécraft Productions Inc., Cleveland, OH
- Release date: 1953
- Running time: 10 minutes
- Country: United States
- Language: English

The Ohio Story television series began its run with a show titled "The House that Jack Built," the story of a man's devotion to his mule. The 10-minute episode premiered on October 4, 1953.

Moving from a radio program to a television format required a lot of additional but necessary effort. Whereas the radio programs merely needed a writer, a narrator, a cast, a researcher, and someone to distribute the shows, the latest TV format also required sets, a director, camera operators, sound technicians, props, film editors, and labs to process the film. TV added considerable cost and time to produce a story.

By 1958, The Ohio Story was broadcast over an 8-station television network. The episodes were often used to fill airtime after a 20-minute news block.

Jan Hofstetter, a scriptwriter with Storycraft, Frank Siedel's writing firm, noted that The Ohio Story television episodes consistently earned "an 18 rating across the state," as high as the series did in its heyday in the days of radio." She attributed the success of the TV series to the fact that the program has evolved with the changing techniques used on Television.

"The men behind the Ohio Bell series have always been willing to experiment with better production techniques. Early television episodes used a form of still animation with voice-over narration. "While the show itself achieved a good audience, the artwork method was rather inflexible to produce. Shortly thereafter, the animation method was dropped in favor of an all-dramatic presentation, using local talent, including Cleveland Play House personnel, in the featured roles.

Twenty-six Ohio Story television broadcasts were produced annually in the first few years, dropping later to 13 per year. Only six television shows were made in 1960. The last Ohio Story television episode aired on WSTV-TV in Steubenville, Ohio, in May 1961.

In 1957, Ohio Bell aired a 10-minute television episode titled "Ohio Story Anniversary" during "Ohio Story" week in Ohio. The episode highlights how the series began and what kind of stories they planned to tell in the future. Nelson Olmsted, host of some radio episodes and almost all television episodes, noted that the children who were two years old when the series began are now in college and starting to write their own version of The Ohio Story. The 10th anniversary episode is on the Hagley Library website.

In March 1961, The Ohio Story radio and television series came to an end. C.O. Poleni, Assistant VP of Ohio Bell Telephone, explained it this way: "The time has come to change the direction of our television programming. The advantages gained by our co-sponsorship of the Bell Telephone Hour and by use of more flexible, local television attractions are among the major considerations in this decision."

The television programs continued to be available for loan through libraries and shown at Rotary, Elks, Lions, and other fraternal group meetings, as well as in-school classes, for years after.

== Television episodes ==
Title
"150,000 ORCHIDS"
Shows how the breeding and cultivation of orchids in Gates Mills, Ohio, has become a multimillion-dollar business.
""A" IS FOR AX"
William Holmes McGuffey of Warren, Ohio, changed the elementary education structure for the entire nation.
"ABOARD A LAKES FREIGHTER"
Follow the Charles White of the Republic Fleet of ore carriers as it plies its way from Ohio ports to loading docks along Lake Superior.
"ACCOUNT PAYABLE"
The story of Arthur St. Clair, who was made governor of the Northwest Territory in 1788. In 1791, he commanded an American army at St. Clair's Defeat, also known as the Battle of the Wabash, which became the greatest Native American victory against the United States.
"ADAMS ‘RINOS"
Seth Adams outsmarts the king of Spain and establishes a Merino sheep dynasty in Ohio.
"AIRSHIPS"
Devoted to the airship age and construction of the big blimps at Goodyear Aircraft.
"ALWAYS READY"
A visit to the Marblehead Coast Guard Station on some of their rescue operations in Lake Erie.
"AND PASS THE AMMUNITION"
Rev. Howell Forgy, an Ohioan, originated the phrase "Praise the Lord and pass the ammunition" while encouraging sailors in action during the Pearl Harbor attack, 7 December 1941. Soon after, it became the title and theme of a popular song.
"ANNIE OAKLEY"
The remarkable story of an unknown girl from Greenville, Ohio, who became an international idol because of her sharpshooting skill.
"ANOTHER MAN'S SON"
The heartwarming story of a Confederate soldier in Ohio territory, who saw the war in a more personal light.
"ANTARCTIC FLIGHT"
Lincoln Ellsworth of Hudson, Ohio, and his daring trip to the Antarctic.
"ART FOR EVERYONE"
The Toledo Museum of Art was the first of its kind to offer a free art educational program for everyone.
"ARTIST IN GLASS"
The story of stained glass making in the Cleveland Studio of Rudolph Sandon.
"BACKSTAGE AT THE BIG TOP"
A visit to the winter quarters of the Mills Brothers Circus in Jefferson, Ohio.
"BALLOON OVER OHIO"
Free ballooning across Ohio with all the fun and glamour of a Jules Verne novel. This episode takes you for a ride in Ohio's only free balloon, one of only two in the country.
"BEAUTIFUL DREAMER"
Merv Griffin plays Stephen Foster in a musical dramatization of Stephen Foster's years in Cincinnati, Ohio.
"BEE CAPITAL OF THE WORLD"
Episode on how candles are made in Medina, Ohio. It also shows the hand-painting and decorating of the famous Easter Paschal candles.
"BELLS OF KENYON"
The story of Peter Neff's defeat in his court battle with the bells of Kenyon.
"BIG DAY AT THE FAIR"
The episode follows a future farmer of America and his first big day as an exhibitor at the Ohio State Fair in Columbus.
"BIG TIMBER IN OHIO"
The story of growing, cutting, and sawing trees for shipping from the 1,800 sawmills in Ohio.
"BIGGEST LITTLE SHIPS IN THE WORLD"
The story of tug boats on the Great Lakes.
"BIRTH OF A GAS STATION"
The story of Harvey Wickliffe, who opened the first gasoline station in the country at Columbus, Ohio.
"BORDER COLLIES"
In Wooster, Ohio, a breed of intelligent dogs is raised under conditions similar to those of their native Scotland. The episode is also titled BUCKEYE SHEPARD.
"BOYS TOWN, OHIO"
A visit to an Ohio Boys Town, where you see government by and of the young boys who participate in its activities.
"BRADY'S LEAP"
The story of the dramatic leap by Sam Brady, a famous Indian fighter, which gave the name to Brady's Lake near Ravenna, Ohio.
"BY HEAVEN WE CAN"
The story of Fort Stephenson, a key War of 1812 supply fort in northern Ohio (near modern-day Fremont). The Fort is famous for the decisive American victory in an August 1813 battle, when Major George Croghan's small force repelled a large British assault, boosting American morale and leading to the British withdrawal.
"CASE OF SIMON GIRTY"
The story of Simon Girty, a man who became a legend in Ohio history.
"CHRISTMAS TREE FARM"
Over and above its sentimental and seasonal values, the Christmas tree plays a vital role in Ohio's billion-dollar farm economy.
"CIRCUIT RIDER"
Early preachers, called circuit riders, were able to visit a settlement once in four or five months. When he finally arrived he performed a number of services besides preaching ad prayer meetings.
"CLARENCE DARROW AND THE HARNESS"
Clarence Darrow of Kinsman, Ohio, was a lawyer who spent nine years fighting a case that involved a $30 harness and a principle of justice that lives to this day.
"CLEVELAND'S PLAY HOUSE"
The inside story of this dedicated theatre company and why it has earned the right to be called the "world's outstanding Community Theatre."
"COL. GIBSON'S FLOUR BARREL"
The story of a barrel of flour, the last of Ft. Laurens' meager supply, and the unexpected manner in which it saved the outpost on the Tuscarawas from certain death. The episode features a brief appearance by Alan Alda (pre-Hawkeye days) playing Killbuck, a Delaware Indian.
"CONSPIRACY ON THE OHIO"
The story of Aaron Burr's conspiracy to overthrow the government and how the fifteen large river boats were built to carry Burr's armed force of 500 men.
"COONSKIN LIBRARY"
The story of how the thirst for knowledge in Amesville, Ohio, started a world-famous library.
"CRIB, THE"
The story of Ohio's human-made Rock of Gibraltar in Lake Erie off Cleveland.
"CROWN JEWELS OF OBERLIN"
The tale of two men and a quest that began in 79 A. D. and ended in Oberlin, Ohio, nearly two thousand years later, when in 1881, Charles Martin Hall and Frank Manning Jewett collaborated, and Hall eventually produced a few beads of aluminum.
"DARLING NELLIE GRAY"
Between 1830 and 1860, more than 40,000 slaves escaped across the Ohio River; Ben Hanby saw this happen and was inspired to write the famous Civil War Song, "Darling Nellie Gray."
"DAY AT ROSEMARY"
A visit to the Rosemary Home for Crippled Children in Cleveland, Ohio, where children are taught the regular school courses and also learn to walk, talk, and play.
"DAY WITH THE FISHING FLEET, A"
The story of commercial fishing, as done in Sandusky, Ohio, one of the world's leading freshwater fishing ports.
"DEATH RAY"
The story of Dr. Benjamin Franklin Thomas, a notable American physicist at The Ohio State University, who was an early X-ray pioneer and tragically died due to overexposure in his research.
"DEPARTMENT OF LIFE AND DEATH"
An episode on the Ohio Department of Health's services and activities safeguards every minute of every Ohioan's life.
"DIXIE"
The story of the great Mt. Vernon, Ohio, songwriter, Dan Emmett, creator of the first minstrel show.
"DOC BEEMAN'S PEPSIN"
The story of Dr. Edward Beeman, who added pepsin (a digestive aid from hog stomachs) to gum in the 1890s to help his patients. The result was Pepsin Gum, a nostalgic, herbal/wintergreen-flavored chewing gum.
"DOWN BY THE OLD MILL STREAM"
The story of the writing of "Down by the Old Mill Stream" by Tell Taylor, from Findlay, Ohio.
"DRIVERS WITH DIPLOMAS"
The story of the 60-hour driver's training course taught in many high schools in Ohio. Since 1947, 170,000 students have been trained to be skillful, safety-minded drivers. The episode was filmed at Rocky River High School in Rocky River, Ohio.
"DRUMMER BOY OF SHILOH"
The story of Johnny Clem of Newark, Ohio, an eleven-year-old drummer boy who became the center of a rallying point at Shiloh, Ohio, during the Civil War. Clem and his drum help turn the tide of the battle.
"EARL SLOAN'S LINIMENT"
How a bottle of ointment helped build the best small-town library in the United States at Zanesfield, Ohio.
"EARLY BIRD, THE"
The story of Stanley Vaughn of the Curtiss-Wright Airplane Division in Columbus, Ohio, whose career has spanned present-day aviation.
"EARTHQUAKE REPORTER"
A story about the seismograph at John Carroll University in Cleveland, Ohio that records earthquakes all over the world.
"ED ALLEN'S BIGGEST DEAL"
The story of the founder of the Society for Crippled Children. Ed Allen's first hospital was built in his hometown, Elyria, Ohio, and today there is a chain of such hospitals worldwide.
"FALSE WITNESS"
The strange story of David Wyrick, engineer and archaeologist. Wyrick claimed evidence found in Newark's Indian mounds proved the American Indians migrated here from Asia and were descended from the Israelites.
"FARMING BY AIR"
The story of a flying farmer shows how the airplane has become a vital piece of Ohio farm machinery.
"FIELD TRIALS"
The story of how ardent sportspeople put their prize hunting dogs through their paces at the Ohio Field Trials.
"FIRE ENGINE CALLED JOE"
The story of the first fire engine in the United States. An event on January 1, 1853, in Cincinnati, Ohio, marked the beginning of paid fire departments and the end of political gangs that controlled volunteer fire companies in major cities.
"FIRST CHRISTMAS TREE"
The episode dramatizes the acceptance of the custom of trimming an evergreen at Christmas time.
"FIVE PANELS FOR GARFIELD"
The five stone panels of the James A. Garfield Monument in Cleveland, Ohio, depict the remarkable life of Garfield, from schoolteacher to President of the United States.
"FLIGHT WITHOUT POWER"
The story of the Toledo, Ohio Glider Club, an organization dedicated to gliding flight.
"FOREST FIRE CONTROL"
How keeping Ohio's five million acres of forest lands green is the task of Ohio's Division of Forestry.
"GARDEN OF EVIL"
The story behind Ohio State University's fascinating and weird cultivation of the most poisonous plants common to Ohio.
"GENERAL, THE"
The story of the little locomotive immortalized in a bronze plaque at the Ohio State Capitol in Columbus. The General gained fame during the Civil War when it played a pivotal role in the desperate dash of 22 Union soldiers through Confederate lines.
"GENTLE JOHNNY APPLESEED"
Johnny Appleseed was born Jonathan Chapman near Boston in 1775 and came to Ohio in 1800 with a canoe-load of apple seeds. He wandered through the countryside planting the seeds, and as the years went by, Johnny's apple orchards sprang up all over Ohio.
"GEORGE HOPPER AND THE TRAMP"
The poorest man in Unionville, Ohio, George Hopper, was always willing to share his food and give shelter to the less fortunate. He accidentally achieved great wealth and success after sheltering a tramp who gave him the formula to prevent oil barrels from leaking.
"GIFT OF SONG"
Depicts the life of the famed Black poet, Paul Laurence Dunbar. Born in Dayton, Ohio, to parents who had been enslaved in Kentucky before the American Civil War, Dunbar began writing stories and verse as a child.
"GLASS BLOWERS OF BREMEN"
The episode tells the story of how "freehand" glass is still being made by Carl Erickson and his skilled craftsmen in Bremen, Ohio.
"GOVERNMENT IN ACTION"
The story of your child in school.
"GRAPES OF WRATH"
The story of a bitter feud, back in 1820, and how the Delaware, Ohio grape got its name.
"HEALTH MUSEUM"
What's the breathing capacity of your lungs? This and many other mysteries are explained in this episode as you take an enlightening and fascinating trip through the Health Museum in Cleveland, Ohio.
"HERE COME THE MOUNTIES"
The behind-the-scenes story of the training of the Cleveland Mounted Police Troop A Division, the only mounted troop left in Ohio, and the most famous troop in the world.
"HERE COMES THE SHOWBOAT"
The Majestic (riverboat), the last floating theatre on the Ohio River. The paddle wheeler was leased by Hiram College for summer student theatre, providing acting experience, vaudeville, and entertainment to river towns, featuring plays and student-run acts with college performers on the historic vessel.
"HEROES OF SPRING STREET"
The true story of 132 prisoners at the Ohio State Penitentiary who volunteered to have cancer cells injected into their bloodstreams for a medical research study, helping doctors understand how the human immune system reacts to foreign cells.
"HOLE IN THE EARTH"
Using a studio as a space ship, the unusual theory of what exists under the earth's surface, put forth in 1818 by John Cleves Symmes of Hamilton, Ohio, is explored.
"HOME TOWN PAPER"
A day in the life of the editor of a small-town newspaper, the Medina County Gazette.
"HORNS O' PLENTY"
A visit to the H. N. White Company (King Musical Instruments in Cleveland, makers of fine band instruments.
"HORSESHOE JUSTICE"
Two men were falsely accused of robbing Jennie Archer of $300. They might have spent the rest of their lives in prison had it not been for Colonel Ferguson, the defense attorney, who reviewed the facts and eventually tracked down the real criminals.
"HOT DOG!"
Tells how a Columbus ballpark concessionaire's ingenuity and a Tad Dorgan cartoon combined to create a great American institution, the "Hot Dog."
"HOUSE THAT JACK BUILT"
The story of the unusual circumstances that caused a man to build a home for a mule near Bellaire, Ohio, 83 years ago.
"HOW THE NICKEL PLATE GOT ITS NAME"
The story of the feud between Norwalk and Bellevue's citizens in 1881, when the railroad was being built.
"I WONDER I WONDER"
The Lake Erie Junior Museum, a kind of open doorway through which children can pass into the wonderful world of nature.
"ICE DETECTIVE"
The Ohio Story radio and TV series marks its 13th anniversary with the 'The Ice Detective' episode. Using motion picture footage of glaciers, Dr. Richard P. Goldthwait, Professor of Geology at OSU, recreates Ohio's historic ice age and gives his views on whether or not Ohioans can expect another deep freeze.
"INNER-CITY"
Follow cameras through the maze of poverty and neglect that hovers in the center of a city, then see the inspired Inner City Protestant Parish in greater Cleveland fight an uphill battle against overwhelming odds.
"JAY COOKE, FINANCIER"
The story of Jay Cooke of Sandusky, Ohio, whose political genius kept the Union on its feet at one time during the Civil War.
"JOHNSON'S ISLAND"
The historical plot to free some 3,000 Confederate prisoners from a stockade on Johnson's Island in Sandusky Bay during the Civil War.
"JUGGLER AND THE STATIONMASTER"
Heartwarming drama of a $10,00 loan to W. C. Fields by a stationmaster in Kent.
"JUSTICE"
An Ohio Story episode about the tensions between the native Onondaga people and the encroaching white settlers in early 19th century Ohio. The episode focuses on a trial that took place outside of current-day Youngstown, after a settler is accused of murdering the Onondaga chief. Although the settler is acquitted, he is then shot and killed by the chief's brother.
"KIDRON AUCTION"
The story of Cy Sprunger, auctioneer, a real Ohio success story about a man who started a prosperous business with a five-dollar bill.
"KING OF THE KEELS"
The story of Mike Fink, King of the Keelboat men, in the days when hard-fighting, Swashbuckling keelboat men ruled the Ohio River.
"LADY FROM CINCINNATI"
The story of a remarkable horse that couldn't pace and a trainer who wouldn't admit defeat.
"LAND BILL ALLEN"
The story of the untiring efforts of Bill Allen, an Ohio peddler, to popularize the Homestead Acts and the effect of his work on the development of our country.
"LAND UNDER GLASS"
The story of how fresh vegetables are raised during the winter in Cleveland's huge greenhouse industry.
"LANTERN TO MY FEET"
A warm drama of the selfless organization in Columbus, Ohio, Pilot Dogs. The episode shows the behind-the-scenes training that transforms a playful boxer into a qualified guide dog for a blind student.
"LIFELINE OF THE ISLANDS"
Unfolds a 25-year legend of one of the world's shortest and most vital airlines, the Island Air Service, which serves as a lifeline for the isolated Lake Erie island country. The film contains some of the dramatic incidents that this aviation operation shares with the daily life of the Lake Erie islands.
"LIGHT IN THE DARKNESS"
The story of children who are taught to live in a world of blindness. It was filmed at the Ohio State School for the Blind, located in Worthington, Ohio.
"LITTLE BROWN JUG"
The story of the world's richest harness race, held annually in Delaware, Ohio.
"LITTLE LEAGUE"
Baseball youth organization explained through the eyes of a Little League volunteer manager.
"LITTLE SWITZERLAND"
The finest cheese in the world is made by the Swiss who left Europe to settle among the gently rolling hills of Wayne, Holmes, and Tuscarawas counties.
"LONG LONG TRAIL OF JAMES BROWN"
Historical drama of James Brown, the famous Smith County counterfeiter, and his Pony Express method of passing counterfeit money.
"LOW WATERMARK OF SAMUEL VINTON"
The dramatic story of Samuel Vinton, an Ohio Lawyer, who changed Ohio's southern boundary in a Virginia courtroom.
"MAGNIFICENT FAILURE"
The story of an Ohio plowboy who became a brilliant general and served two terms as President of the United States - Ulysses S. Grant.
"MAIL DETECTIVE"
Cites the courage and ingenuity employed by federal agent John Wheeler in solving a series of thefts on the Cleveland to Columbus stage line.
"MAN IN STATUARY HALL"
One of the most colorful characters in Ohio was a man called "Rise-up" William Allen. He was the congressman, governor, and conscience of the state.
"MAN WHO WRECKED THE TEMPLE"
The story of George W. Bellows prizefight painting, "A Stag at Sharkey's," that hangs in the Cleveland Art Museum.
"MAPLE SUGAR FESTIVAL"
The episode looks at a highlight in the spring calendar - maple syrup boiling time and Geauga County's annual maple sugar festival in Chardon.
"MATTER OF REVENGE"
James Copus and frontier justice in Ashland County.
"MILTON CANIFF STORY"
Steve Canyon's creator, Milton Caniff, tells of his Ohio background.
"MINUTEMEN WITH WINGS"
Features the Ohio Air National Guard and a trip to Collins Air Force Base in Alpena, Michigan.
"MISSION ACCOMPLISHED"
A sequel to the Ohio Story "Strategic Air Command" episode; bombers scout targets all over the world on training missions.
"MISSION IN MARIETTA"
The inspiring story of Catherine Fay of Marietta, Ohio. Her remarkable courage in the face of opposition enabled her to found the first orphan home in the United States.
"MONUMENT TO A BROKEN ARM"
Some 66 citizens of Gallipolis lost their lives when Yellow Jack came calling up the river.
"MONUMENT TO A PIG"
The story behind a plain marble monument found in the little Southern Ohio Village of Blue Ball.
"MORGAN'S ESCAPE"
Rebel leader, John Hunt Morgan, escapes from the Ohio State Penitentiary in a historical drama.
"MOTHER MOLLY"
The story of Molly Bawn, the mother of the Holsteins in Ohio. Molly was Ohio's first imported cow from Holland, brought to Wellington, Ohio, in 1881.
"MOTHER THOMPSON AND THE MEANEST MAN IN OHIO"
"MOUND BUILDERS"
2700-year-old burial mounds are excavated and explored at the Niles Wolford site near Circleville, Ohio.
"MR. LINCOLN'S RIGHT-HAND"
Edwin Stanton was vain, stubborn, unjust, and cruel but without his chapter, all the Ohio story pages since 1861 might have been written very differently.
"MRS. STOWE'S WAR"
A frightened, half-frozen slave girl named Eliza helped precipitate the war between the states, as Harriet Beecher Stowe's early days in Cincinnati inspired Uncle Tom's Cabin, the most controversial book of its time.
"MUSIC TO SEE BY"
The film documents the use of the Optophone, a machine that allows blind people to read by ear.
"MYSTERY OF MR. RAREY"
The story of the internationally acclaimed horse trainer, John Solomon Rarey of Groveport, Ohio, who won lasting fame for his simple yet effective principles.
"NIKE: GUARDIAN GODDESS OF OHIO"
Describes how Nike missiles are prepared to protect Ohio in the event of an attack.
"NINTH PRESIDENT"
The story of Edward James Roye of Newark, Ohio, who became President of Liberia.
"OBERLIN ART DETECTIVE"
Under Richard Buck's direction, the laboratory at Oberlin examines and refurbishes the lovely works of art.
"OH, SAY CAN YOU SEE?"
This film describes the research Dr. Samuel Renshaw, Professor of Physics at Ohio State University, is doing to improve our way of life through proper use of our God-given senses.
"OHIO - MICHIGAN WAR"
Started in 1835 when two armies marched on Toledo, ended when a clerk put a court record in his hat, and is revived each fall when eleven representatives of each state meet in Ann Arbor or Columbus to commit collegiate mayhem on each other.
"OHIO GRIT"
Today in South Amherst, the world's largest sandstone quarries produce stone for factories, homes, churches, etc. This film shows the process of mining and cutting the sandstone.
"OHIO HAS SAVED THE NATION"
Historical drama of the turbulent Ohio gubernatorial campaign during the Civil War, which prompted President Lincoln to send his famous telegram, "Ohio Has Saved the Nation."
"OHIO STATE BAND"
Even if the well of football talent would run dry, the fans would still flock to the stadium on Saturday afternoons in autumn.
"OHIO STATE HIGHWAY PATROL"
The story of this fast-moving patrol that supervises almost 86,000 miles of highways. Its activities are unlimited. In the Sandusky Bay area, the patrol is seaborne. The airborne patrol conducts aerial surveys, and the highway patrol is responsible for law enforcement on the highways.
"OHIO STORY ANNIVERSARY"
In a celebration of The Ohio Story's tenth anniversary, Nelson Olmsted, the series narrator, and John A. Greene, President of Ohio Bell Telephone, present a general overview of Ohio's history and share predictions of what the future may hold for the state.
"OUT OF THIS WORLD"
A visit to the Ohio State School for the Deaf. The school staff, dedicated to training the deaf children to take their place in the "outer world," carefully trains them.
"PASSPORT TO WAITING WORLDS"
Diary of the second largest library in the country, the Cleveland Public Library.
"PERKINS EQUATION"
How astronomy professor Hiram Perkins was able to donate a quarter of a million dollars for an observatory, even though he never received a salary exceeding $1,800 a year, because of a fortune that was built through his famous equation for raising hogs at a profit.
"PLATT SPENCER'S SYSTEM"
The story of Platt Rogers Spencer, the man who taught the country to write beautiful letters that are "Plain to the eye and gracefully combined to train the muscles and inform the mind."
"PORT OF TOLEDO"
The story of why a river town in the Midwest happens to be the world's coal shipping capital.
"POSTBOY OHIO"
The story of Ralph Johnson and his near-tragic part in the naming of the crossroads settlement of Postboy, Ohio. His identification of a murderer at his hanging is the powerful climax to this story.
"POWER SQUADRON"
Safety afloat demonstrated by Ohio Chapters of the US Power Squadron.
"PRICE OF FREEDOM"
The story of another century, when the city of Zanesville, Ohio, helped provide and preserve the dollars and cents for ex-slave George Root to buy his last son's freedom.
"PROSECUTOR"
The story of Thomas Ewing, the bold young prosecuting attorney from Lancaster, Ohio, who later became a United States Senator and then President Harrison's Secretary of the Treasury.
"READIN', RITIN' AND TV"
Thousands of children in Cincinnati, Ohio, have schoolwork TV lessons. From first-grade arithmetic to high school chemistry, lessons are piped into the classrooms.
"RETURN OF THE ZANES"
The famous tales of the Old West by Zane Grey were inspired in an attic in Zanesville, Ohio, years ago.
"REVOLT OF LUCY STONE"
When Lucy Stone, American orator, abolitionist, and suffragist, enrolled at Oberlin College in 1843, she was only the fourth woman to do so. Her suffrage antics and activities at Oberlin reached the ears of many - in gratitude by women, in anger by men.
"'RITHMETIC RAY"
The remarkable story of Joseph Ray, the man who revolutionized the teaching of mathematics.
"SAFE SAFES"
The story of the Mosler Safe Company, of Hamilton, Ohio, the company whose safes guard 75% of the world's wealth.
"SCARLET CARNATION"
The strange story of a red carnation's role in the life of Ohio's martyred president, William McKinley.
"SCHOOL FOR THE BLIND"
At the Ohio State School for the Blind in Columbus, Ohio, great emphasis is placed on vocational training. Every opportunity is provided for students to help themselves, and when they graduate, to face the outside world.
"SEAWAY TO OHIO"
The day when foreign ships can sail directly to Ohio Ports is not far away. By 1960, life in Ohio will change significantly due to the St. Lawrence Seaway.
"SHAKESPEARE UNDER THE STARS"
A visit to the campus of Antioch College, the home of a drama festival that has gained international recognition.
"SHERIDAN'S RIDE"
The link between history and literature was never stronger than on the November night in 1864 when Cincinnati poet, Thomas Buchanan Read, immortalized General Philip Sheridan's charge at the Battle of Cedar Creek during the American Civil War.
"SHOES"
The early settlers of Mesopotamia, Ohio, overcame most of the hardships they were forced to endure. The problem of shoes proved almost too much for them until Hezekiah Sperry, the town's founder, finally found the answer.
"SILENT WITNESS"
This story takes you behind the Cleveland Police Bureau of Scientific Identification scenes to show how Dave Cowles and his crack crew of crime fighters bring speedy justice to lawbreakers.
"SILVER ON SALT CREEK"
Bits of silver in Sam Chandler's new well started the Ohio silver rush and proved a silver dollar can go a long way, especially when it is fired down a well.
"SON OF MOTHER MACHREE"
Merv Griffin is cast as Cleveland composer Ernest Ball, an American singer and songwriter, most famous for composing the music for the song "When Irish Eyes Are Smiling" in 1912. Ball was not Irish, and neither were the lyricists.
"SOUNDS FROM THE STARS"
The story is set in Columbus, Ohio, at the Ohio State University, where radio can be received from many planets and stars in our universe.
"SPIRIT OF ARCHIE WILLARD"
The famous painting, The spirit of '76, hanging in Cleveland City Hall, was inspired by vivid tales of the Revolutionary War, as told to Archie Willard, the Bedford, Ohio boy.
"STAND OF CAPTAIN McCONNELL"
The courageous captain who saved three Indian prisoners accused of murdering a group of settlers from mob violence.
"STORM, THE"
On November 18, 1913, 36 ships and 136 seamen were lost in one of the worst hurricanes ever to strike the Great Lakes. This is the story of Milt Smith, assistant engineer of the ill-fated SS Charles S. Price.
"STORYTELLER OF SPRING STREET"
A true "O. Henry" story enacted in Columbus, Ohio, years ago. When O. Henry, then known as Will Porter, was serving a term in the Ohio State Penitentiary. 50 years ago, he participated in a dramatic incident in which a safecracker named Dick Price opened a safe to foil a stock promotion swindle. From this affair, the writer created the Jimmy Valentine story.
"STRANGE REUNION"
The story of Magdalena Hartman, a widow, and her reuniting with her 18-year-old daughter who had been captured by the Seneca Indians when she was a baby. A childhood lullaby used by the mother to reclaim her long-lost daughter is the basis of the drama.
"STRATEGIC AIR COMMAND"
Filmed at Lockbourne Air Base in Columbus, Ohio, this film examines the operation of SAC's "RB 47s," the jet bombers that fly to the far corners of the globe.
"TAMING OF LOTTIE MOON, THE"
The famous Confederate spy, Lottie Moon, is outmaneuvered in every way. Frank Siedel, the scriptwriter loved the story and told the story as an Ohio Story radio episode, a TV episode and an episode on Cavalcade of America. The Cavalcade of America episode starred Lucille Ball playing Lottie Moon. Siedel also told the story in his 1950 book, The Ohio Story.
"TENTH FRENCHMAN"
The story of buried treasure said to be hidden away for nearly 200 years near Minerva, Ohio. A letter written in 1755 describes the treasure as the French Army's gold taken from Fort Duquesne during the British attack on that stronghold.
"TOLEDO MALL"
The story of the new "Shoppers' See-Way," an experimental pedestrianized mall in Toledo, Ohio. Developed in an attempt to revitalize the city's downtown area, the mall includes shops, fountains, outdoor statues loaned by the Toledo Museum of Art, small parks, a playground, and more.
"TRAINING FOR TOMORROW"
A visit to the new Industrial Arts School in Parma, Ohio. Here, young artisans are learning how to become citizens of an industrial age and an industrial world.
"TREES FOR TOMORROW"
The story of the efforts of Forest Rangers in the Muskingum Watershed Conservancy District to save our beautiful woodlands.
"TRIAL BY DEATH"
The story of Clement Vallandingham, who was ostracized because he attacked President Lincoln's administration. He finally squared himself with the nation when he suffered a strange death at the Golden Lamb Inn in Lebanon, Ohio, to prove an accused murderer's innocence.
"TRIAL OF DORSEY VIERS, THE"
After the acquittal of the murder of Rupert Charlesworth, the accused, Dorsey Viers, finds that the hangman's noose would have been more merciful.
"UP ON THE HOUSETOPS"
The story of Ben Hanby, a young minister in New Paris, Ohio, whose gift to the children on Christmas Eve long ago was the happy song "Up on the Housetops."
"VICKIE FOR PRESIDENT"
A historical film of the life of Victoria Claflin Woodhull, the first woman to run in a presidential campaign.
"VIOLIN MAKERS OF MAIN STREET"
A visit to the only American violin manufacturing company in the US, the Jackson-Guldan Company in Columbus, Ohio.
"VOLUNTEERS, THE"
A visit to a small town to pay tribute to the volunteer firemen.
"WANTED, A HOME"
A visit through Cleveland's Animal Protective League kennels with director "Uncle Henry" Leffingwell and a young client.
"WHEN OLD BETSY SPOKE"
The story of a cannon that stands today in Birchard Library Park in Fremont, but which back in 1813 played a significant role in ensuring the young American Republic's survival.
"WHO IS THERE TO MOURN FOR LOGAN?"
"Who is there to mourn for Logan? Not one" comes from the famous "Logan's Lament," a speech by Logan (Iroquois leader) after colonists massacred his family in 1774. The speech highlights his profound isolation and grief as he sought vengeance but found no one left to mourn him.
"WINTERTIME ZOO"
The Ohio Story takes you behind the scenes at The Toledo Zoo.
"WITCHCRAFT ON TRIAL"
Humorous dramatization of Ohio's only witchcraft trial in 1823.
"WRECK OF THE SHENANDOAH"
The story of the tragic wreck of the dirigible, USS Shenandoah (ZR-1), near Ava, Ohio, in 1925.
"X-RAY INCIDENT"
Dr. George W. Crile of Chille, Ohio, and Professor Dayton Miller of Cleveland took the first medical X-ray picture.
