= Nelson Olmsted =

American actor (1914–1992)

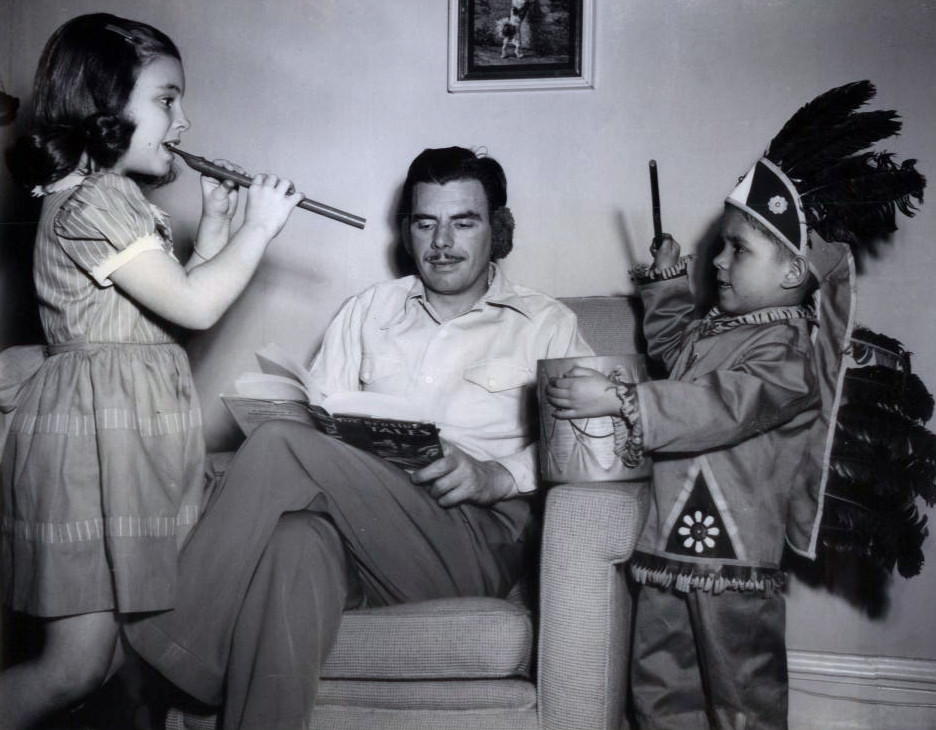
- Olmsted and his two children in 1947.
- Born: Leroy Nelson Olmsted Jr. January 28, 1914; Minneapolis, Minnesota, U.S.
- Died: April 8, 1992 (aged 78); Torrance, California, U.S.
- Occupation: Actor
- Years active: 1937–1978

Nelson Olmsted (January 28, 1914, Minneapolis, Minnesota – April 8, 1992, Torrance, California) was an actor in films and recordings, and on radio and television, from the 1950s to the 1970s. Sometimes billed as Nelson Olmstead, he was best known for an unusual NBC radio series, Sleep No More (1956–57), in which he narrated his own adaptations of terror tales and science-fantasy stories.

== Life & legacy ==
After study at the University of Texas, Olmsted began in radio in the late 1930s as an announcer for WBAP in Fort Worth, Texas. When he launched Black Night (1937–1939), a late-night 30-minute horror series, it was only a local program, but it created a sensation, with mail arriving at WBAP from ten states. A review in Radio News took note of the chilling music (by Gene Baugh) and horrific sound effects (by A.M. Woodford). Produced by Ken Douglass, the series began November 5, 1937, with Edgar Allan Poe's "The Tell-Tale Heart" and then continued on with original scripts by Virginia Wiltten. Olmsted starred and was heard in a variety of different roles.

Within a year, the impact of Black Night catapulted Olmsted to New York, where he was immediately established as NBC's resident storyteller, a position he held for over a decade, beginning with The World's Greatest Short Stories (1939, 1944, 1947) and Dramas by Olmsted (1940–41).

Today, Olmsted is best remembered for his spoken word recordings released by the Vanguard Recording Society. One of these was the LP version of Sleep No More! The album's back cover featured a box in which Olmsted delivered a capsule summary of his life:

Now that I think of it, we had a sort of Golden Age of Drama down in Austin, Texas, during those depressed middle thirties. There was the Curtain Club of the University of Texas and Austin's Little Theatre, and working between them were such aspirants as Zachary Scott, Elaine Anderson Scott, Eli Wallach, Walter Cronkite, Brooks West and Alma Holloway, whom I had sense enough to marry. Most of them came on to New York, fought the actor's battle, and made it one way or another. I stayed behind with the security of a radio announcer's job. By the time I moved to WBAP, in Fort Worth, this security was pulling, and the announcer's life seemed endlessly sterile. What to do about it? Dramatic shows cost money and there were no budgets. The cheapest drama for radio I could think of was good literature, read aloud. Especially the work of that great dramatist who never wrote a play – Edgar Allan Poe. WBAP gave me some time with which to experiment. That was way back in 1939 – and it worked. By 1940, the storytelling show was on NBC for a ten-year run. There were a couple of years out for the Army, but even so I managed to tell stories over the Army radio network in Italy. Television brought rough competition to the industry. Rather than fight, I joined by adapting some of the best stories into plays, selling them to Fred Coe, and playing a part in them – sometimes the lead. So – in the long run – I got to New York, too, and made it as an actor, literally by telling stories!

At one point, Olmsted lived in Flower Hill, New York, at 243 Mason Drive. A small green space on Mason Drive just north of his former home is named Nelson Olmsted Green in honor of Olmsted.

== Television and films ==
Olmsted's appearances during the era of live television began in 1950 with The Chevrolet Tele-Theatre and Lights Out, followed by Schlitz Playhouse of Stars (1951). The Philco Television Playhouse (1951–52), Kraft Television Theatre (1951–52), Tales of Tomorrow (1952), Hallmark Hall of Fame (1952), Goodyear Television Playhouse (1953), Robert Montgomery Presents (1953–54), Studio One (1954–55), The Phil Silvers Show (1955–59) and NBC Sunday Showcase (1959).

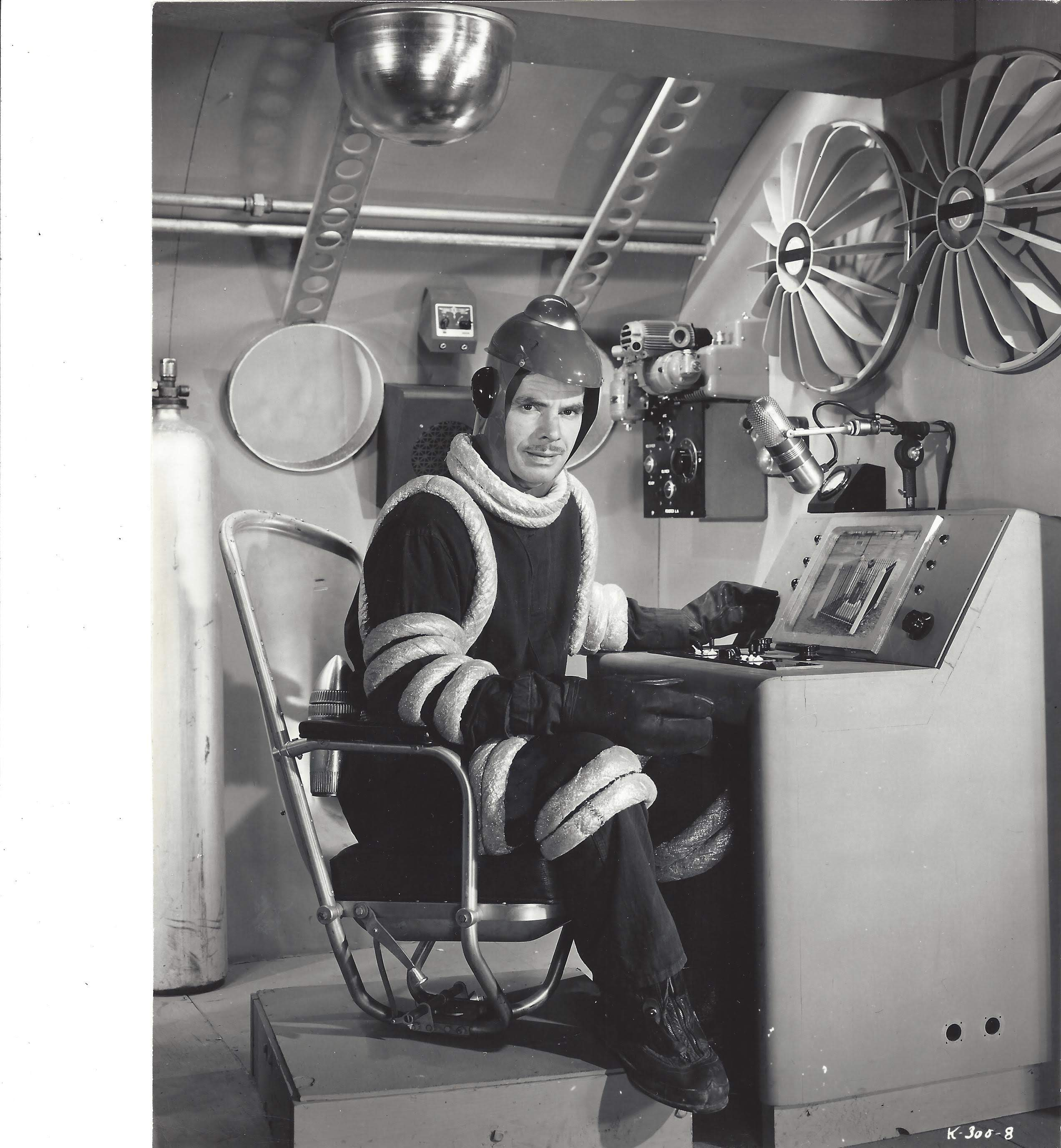
Nelson Olmsted narrated and acted in over 150 episodes of the Ohio Story television series. Image courtesy of Hagley Museum and Library

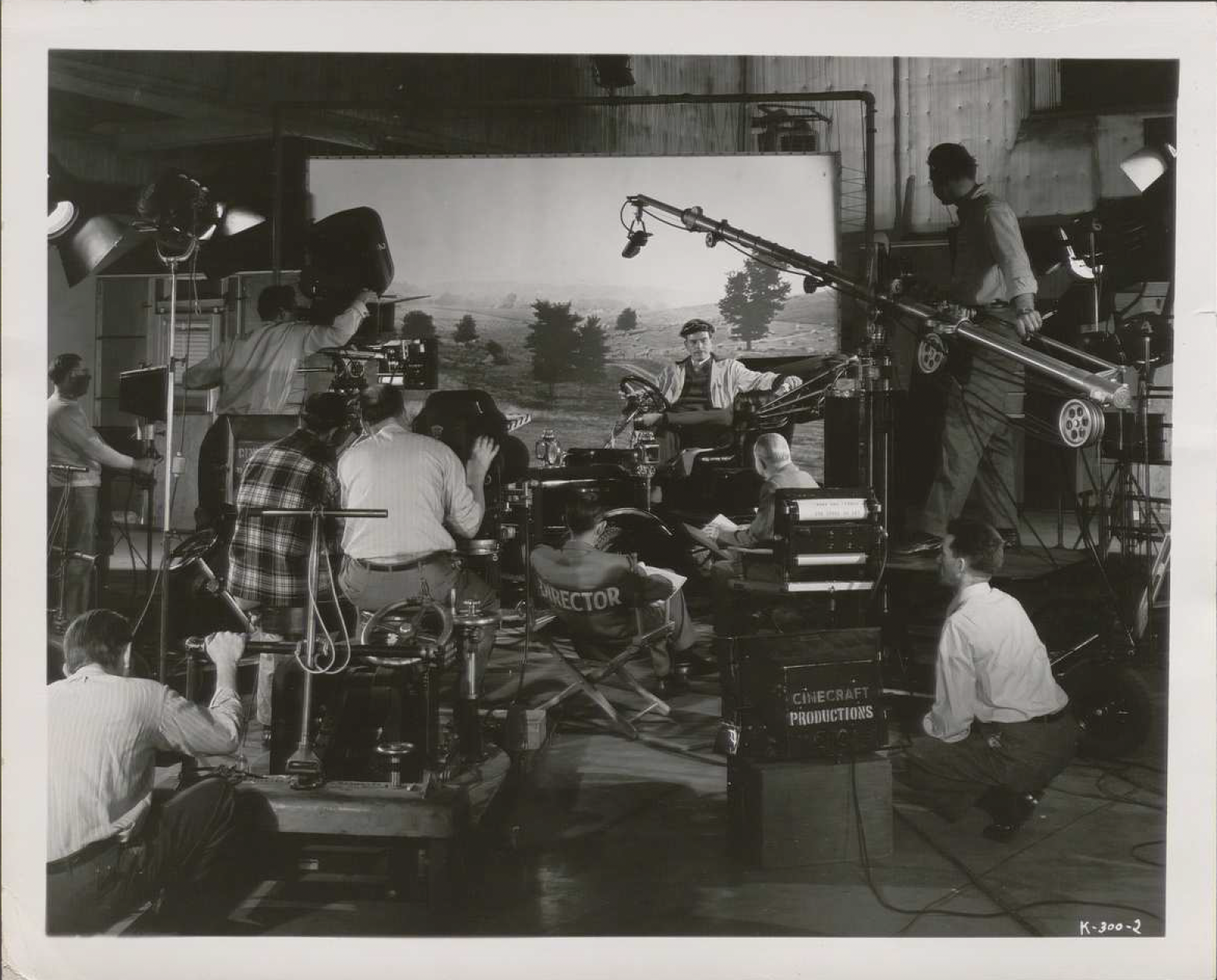
Olmsted (facing camera) was a popular actor in the early days of television. Image courtesy of Hagley Museum and Library

In October 1952, Olmsted replaced Robert Waldrop as the narrator and star of the regional Ohio Story radio and television series. The series, sponsored by Ohio Bell, written by Frank Siedel and produced by Stuart Buchanan, ran for 15 years. At the time the series was the longest-running regional scripted program in the nation.

When the series came to an end in 1961, 1,309 radio and 175 television episodes had been produced. Olmsted narrated and starred in almost all of the television episodes and approximately 300 of the radio episodes. Ray Culley of Cinécraft Productions directed the television episodes.

Olmsted made guest appearances on the CBS court drama series Perry Mason, including the role of murderer Arthur Colemar in the 1960 episode, "The Case of the Treacherous Toupee." He guest-starred in the Fess Parker Daniel Boone series, Season 5 episode 19 as Thaddeus King from Bourbon County, Kentucky. He also guest-starred in a 1961 episode, "A Doctor Comes to Town," of the series Window on Main Street. He continued in television until the mid-1970s.

His film roles included Middle of the Night (1959), That Touch of Mink (1962), Diary of a Madman (1963), Fitzwilly (1967) and Butch Cassidy and the Sundance Kid (1969). His last movie was Hughes and Harlow: Angels in Hell (1977).

== Filmography ==
Year	Title	Role	Notes
1959	Middle of the Night	Erskine	
1961	The Outsider	Radio Announcer	Uncredited
1961	Lover Come Back	District Attorney Wesson	Uncredited
1962	Moon Pilot	Police Officer Dennis	Uncredited
1962	Lad, A Dog	Dog Show Judge	Uncredited
1962	That Touch of Mink	Paul Hackett	Uncredited
1963	Diary of a Madman	Dr. Borman	
1964	Quick Before It Melts	Scientist	
1964	Dear Heart	Herb	
1965	Hazel - Noblesse Oblige	Mr. Prichard	
1967	In Like Flint	Captain	Uncredited
1967	The Reluctant Astronaut	Dr. Lowe	Uncredited
1967	Fitzwilly	Simmons	
1969	Butch Cassidy and the Sundance Kid	Photographer	
1977	Hughes and Harlow: Angels in Hell	Judge	
