= Daryn Hinton =

American former child actress

- Born: Santa Monica, California, USA
- Occupations: Actress, Business manager, Businesswoman
- Years active: 1955–1970 a child actress, 1976–present as businesswoman, designer, author and manager
- Father: Ed Hinton
- Relatives: Darby Hinton (brother)

Daryn Hinton is an American former child actress who was reared in the Hollywood entertainment industry in the 1950s and 1960s. Hinton had a spiritual conversion and left the Hollywood to pursue her newfound faith.

== Family and background ==
Born in Santa Monica, California, Hinton was the daughter of Ed Hinton and granddaughter of Edgar Latimer Hinton, both of whom were actors. Her grandfather was also a big developer along with his brothers in Wilmington and Wrightsville Beach North Carolina. Her mother was entertainment socialite Marilynn Hinton who was president emeritus of WAIF and president of ANTAN (American National Theater Authorities), alongside John Forsythe.

In her autobiography, actress Jane Russell called Marilynn Hinton "Dynamite...and a walking who's who", who knew everyone important and could make anything happen. Hinton's sister, Darcy Hinton Cook, was also an actress whose godparents were actors Steve Cochran and Denise Darcel.

Hinton's father, Ed Hinton, was killed on Columbus Day 1958 in a seaplane crash on Santa Catalina Island, California, with his family at the site of the crash. Fess Parker, who played brother Darby Hinton's father, Daniel Boone on the television series of the same name, which aired from 1964 to 1970, became an important father figure to Hinton and her brother, according to Darby Hinton who spoke at the 2010 Fess Parker memorial in Santa Barbara, California.

Hinton grew up at 1234 Bel Air Road in East Gate Old Bel Air, Los Angeles. The home was featured in Life Magazine essays on Bel Air because of its jungle-like atmosphere and pool in the living room. The Hintons were friends with many of their celebrity neighbors including Zsa Zsa Gabor and former president Ronald Reagan. Hinton's actor father Ed Hinton appeared on Reagan's CBS anthology series, General Electric Theater. Upon Reagan's death, Hinton expressed her views of Reagan to the Los Angeles Times on June 6, 2004. "This man made Americans feel good about being American and right now we need to remember that, especially in these difficult times," said Hinton. Hinton spoke out internationally about Reagan as well to The Guardian in the United Kingdom. She recounted Reagan's legendary ability as the "Great Communicator" to reach out to the American people. "He was able to communicate to people how he felt about America. He was an actor, after all."

=== Hollywood career ===
Hinton started acting and modeling at one year of age and was on numerous television shows and movies including Lassie, One Step Beyond, Rescue 8, Death Valley Days, Shoot-Out at Medicine Bend, and The Tennessee Ernie Ford Show.

Hinton also worked on the crew of Don Ho's television program. In 1979, she promoted the Las Vegas Film Festival at the Cannes Film Festival with movie and TV personalities Stuart Whitman and Sivi Aberg supervising filming for Dick Clark on board The Jolly Joker. In 1981, Hinton produced a television pilot in Hawaii starring Gilad Jankowitz using the second unit Magnum, P.I. production team, including Bruce Shirley. It was the first exercise show shot on location. Jankowitz later developed the show for international audiences under the name Bodies in Motion.

== Spiritual conversion ==
After the death of Hinton's mother in 1982, Hinton's life changed with a born again experience with Christ. She walked away from Hollywood connections and pursued her newfound faith. Hinton states "I became a miracle junkie, loving a one-on-one relationship with God, walking in miracles and feeling HIM guiding me." Hinton, although never before involved with the music industry, managed three Christian bands that gained mainstream international attention.

=== Rock Bands ===
Stryper: (managed/financed by Hinton) Hinton talks about thinking the heavy metal band Stryper was using God as a gimmick and being turned around while seeing them perform in 1984 in their "In The Beginning" video. Stryper is recognized as the first openly Christian heavy metal band to gain recognition in the mainstream music world.

Holy Soldier: (managed/financed by Hinton) signed for debut record to Word Records/Myrrh Records and A&M Records. In 1989 Hinton signed Holy Soldier to A&M records and Myrrh Records (Word Records) as that label's first Hard Rock act. Their self-titled debut album was released in 1990 to critical and commercial acclaim. The band garnered two Dove Awards in 1991, in the hard rock song and album of the year categories.

Charizma from Sweden: (managed by Hinton beginning 8/8/88) They were the first Christian band signed to a Russian record label. Hinton signed them to Russia's only record label at the time, Melodiya Records releasing the record 'Rock'in The World Together.
