= List of Daniel Boone episodes =

This is a list of episodes for the television series Daniel Boone.

== Series overview ==
Season	Episodes	Originally released		Color	DVD release date
Season	Episodes	First released	Last released	Color	DVD release date
1	29	September 24, 1964	April 29, 1965	Black & White	September 26, 2006
2	30	September 16, 1965	April 21, 1966	Color	September 26, 2006
3	28	September 15, 1966	April 13, 1967	Color	May 8, 2007
4	26	September 14, 1967	April 4, 1968	Color	June 19, 2007
5	26	September 19, 1968	May 1, 1969	Color	August 7, 2007
6	26	September 18, 1969	May 7, 1970	Color	November 18, 2008

Cast
Character	Portrayed by	Season					
Character	Portrayed by	1	2	3	4	5	6
Daniel Boone	Fess Parker	Main	Main	Main	Main	Main	Main
Yadkin	Albert Salmi	Main					
Mingo	Ed Ames	Main	Main	Main	Main		
Rebecca Boone	Patricia Blair	Main	Main	Main	Main	Main	Main
Jemima Boone	Veronica Cartwright	Main	Main				
Josh Clements	Jimmy Dean					Main	Main
Gabe Cooper	Rosey Grier						Main
Israel Boone	Darby Hinton	Main	Main	Main	Main	Main	Main
Jericho Jones	Robert Logan		Recurring				
Cincinnatus	Dallas McKennon	Recurring	Recurring	Recurring	Recurring	Recurring	Recurring

== Episodes ==
=== Season 1 (1964–1965) ===
All episodes in black-and-white

No. overall	No. in season	Title	Directed by	Written by	Original release date
1	1	"Ken-Tuck-E"	George Marshall	Borden Chase	September 24, 1964
When Daniel and his new friends start carrying out their plan to build a fort, they must add to their plans to prevent conflict with warring Indians.
2	2	"Tekawitha McLeod"	Thomas Carr	Paul King	October 1, 1964
A slave trader shows up at the fort to sell the "adopted daughter" of the Cherokee chief. Daniel recognizes her and takes her in, but the chief intends to get her back.
3	3	"My Brother's Keeper"	John English	Paul King	October 8, 1964
An Indian who resembles Mingo turns on Mingo's friends, and only Daniel's son Israel will believe Mingo is innocent.
4	4	"The Family Fluellen"	Byron Paul	Herman Miller	October 22, 1964
The family of a Welsh fugitive is found in the woods and brought to Fort Boonesborough, but may be arrested and taken to pay the man's debts.
5	5	"The Choosing"	Thomas Carr	Paul King	October 29, 1964
Daniel takes his daughter Jemima to see some prime territory he hopes to give her, but after they meet some men with their own agenda and are forced to fall in with them, Jemima isn't sure that land is her preferred gift.
6	6	"Lac Duquesne"	Thomas Carr	Paul Savage	November 5, 1964
A traitorous Frenchman has some folks in the area fooled, but Daniel is on the job to foil his plan.
7	7	"The Sound of Wings"	Harry Harris	John Hawkins	November 12, 1964
A disgraced British officer impersonates Daniel Boone to attempt to turn things his way with the Indians.
8	8	"A Short Walk to Salem"	Harry Harris	Paul King	November 19, 1964
Daniel takes his son Israel on a trading trip with him, and the boy is introduced to the dangers of the wilderness.
9	9	"The Sisters O'Hannrahan"	John English	Story by : Samuel Roeca; Teleplay by : David Duncan	December 3, 1964
Two Irish indentured girls are accidentally bought by Daniel and Yad, and the men must figure out what to do for them.
10	10	"Pompey"	Joseph H. Lewis	David Duncan	December 10, 1964
Daniel meets a runaway slave who won't accept Daniel's efforts to free him.
11	11	"Mountain of the Dead"	Byron Paul	David Duncan	December 17, 1964
Daniel tries to find the connection between two men who propose meeting him at a certain mountain.
12	12	"Not in Our Stars"	John English	Story by : Calvin Clements; Teleplay by : John Hawkins	December 31, 1964
The Kentuckians don't take kindly to threats of being driven off their lands by order of the governor of Virginia.
13	13	"The Hostages"	George Sherman	Carey Wilber	January 7, 1965
Rebecca Boone is taken hostage by a band headed by a woman who plans to ally with the British.
14	14	"The Returning"	John English	Don Ingalls	January 14, 1965
An old acquaintance of Daniel's kills three Indians and then heads to Boonesborough, confident that Daniel will protect him.
15	15	"The Prophet"	Robert Webb	Carey Wilber	January 21, 1965
The Indians have a man staying with them who claims to be a prophet, and is inciting them to attack the settlers.
16	16	"The First Stone"	Harry Harris	Story by : Theodore Apstein; Teleplay by : Theodore Apstein & Herman Miller	January 28, 1965
17	17	"A Place of 1000 Spirits"	George Sherman	Story by : Cecil Dan Harmon; Teleplay by : David Humphreys Miller	February 4, 1965
18	18	"The Sound of Fear"	Harry Harris	Story by : Truman Clay; Teleplay by : Dick Nelson & Truman Clay	February 11, 1965
19	19	"The Price of Friendship"	John English	Frank Chase	February 18, 1965
20	20	"The Quietists"	George Sherman	Herman Groves	February 25, 1965
21	21	"The Devil's Four"	David Butler	Story by : Mark Rodgers; Teleplay by : Herman Groves	March 4, 1965
22	22	"The Reunion"	George Marshall	Story by : Rita Lakin; Teleplay by : Rita Lakin & Jack Paritz	March 11, 1965
23	23	"The Ben Franklin Encounter"	Nathan Juran	David Duncan	March 18, 1965
24	24	"Four-Leaf Clover"	John English	Preston Wood	March 25, 1965
25	25	"Cain's Birthday"	Paul Landres	Carey Wilber	April 1, 1965
26	26	"Cain's Birthday"	Paul Landres	Carey Wilber	April 8, 1965
27	27	"Daughter of the Devil"	Joseph Sargent	Stephen Lord	April 15, 1965
28	28	"Doll of Sorrow"	Paul Landres	Herman Miller	April 22, 1965
29	29	"The Courtship of Jericho Jones"	Nathan Juran	Story by : Edward J. Lasko; Teleplay by : Edward J. Lasko & D.D. Beauchamp	April 29, 1965

=== Season 2 (1965–1966) ===
All episodes filmed in color beginning in Season 2 and onwards

No. overall	No. in season	Title	Directed by	Written by	Original release date
30	1	"Empire of the Lost"	Nathan Juran	Herman Groves	September 16, 1965
Enemy Chickasaws help Daniel save Kentucky and its settlers from the greed of a fanatical British officer (Edward Mulhare) who means to seize the rich country for himself and sell its dwellers into bondage.
31	2	"The Tortoise and the Hare"	George Sherman	D.D. Beauchamp	September 23, 1965
Boonesborough's chances to win the annual Spring Foot-Race with the Indians hangs in the balance when Daniel, the fort's best runner, sprains his ankle prior to the hotly contested race.
32	3	"The Mound Builders"	Nathan Juran	Clyde Ware	September 30, 1965
Daniel and Mingo find themselves party to a mysterious figure from the long dead Aztec nation on a journey to the Shawnee's forbidden valley of the Death.
33	4	"My Name Is Rawls"	George Sherman	Story by : William Putnam; Teleplay by : William Putnam & D.D. Beauchamp	October 7, 1965
Daniel strikes out alone to capture Rawls, a powerful runaway slave, who steals fur pelts by night to earn his passage back to Africa.The renegades who hired him to steal also want him back so they can turn him in and collect the bounty. They kidnap Jemima Boone to force Daniel to make a trade.
34	5	"The Old Man and the Cave"	George Marshall	Walter Black	October 14, 1965
Israel Boone rescues a half starved aged Indian, Nitashanta, from death in a dark cave, only to discover he has violated a centuries-old burial custom.
35	6	"The Trek"	George Sherman	Clair Huffaker	October 21, 1965
Daniel develops a mutual respect for and bonds with a notorious renegade, John Benton, as they fight untold odds together on the lengthy trek to Benton's hanging.
36	7	"The Aaron Burr Story"	Maurice Geraghty	Raphael Hayes	October 28, 1965
A stranger arrives at the fort and wins a shooting contest for a turkey with a pistol. The stranger is Aaron Burr (Leif Erickson), who impresses Jericho and wants to be at the mouth of the Cumberland River in 15 days. Daniel, unsure of Burr's motivations declines but Jericho agrees to take him for $200 and potentially more in the future. Burr is on the way to meet a 300-man party of soldiers to start a new country in that area. Daniel and Mingo catch up to arrest Burr, but are captured and taken prisoner by him. Daniel turns the tables but is stopped by Jericho, who challenges Burr to a duel, but Burr's pistol is empty and Jericho deliberately misses. In the fracas that follows, Burr escapes, but the returning trio watches him ride by, a prisoner as they return to Boonesborough.
37	8	"Cry of Gold"	Nathan Juran	Dick Nelson & M. Finley	November 4, 1965
In a plot to take over most of Boonesborough's land, owners of the Salem Land Development Company hire two rogues, Tom Cromwell and Blake, to murder Daniel Boone. Over time, however, Tom becomes Daniel's ally and eventually saves his life.
38	9	"The Peace Tree"	George Sherman	John and Ward Hawkins	November 11, 1965
Israel Boone, Monlutha and Dougle (son of a Scottish settler), work together to prevent a war between the settlers and Indians by preparing a "peace medicine"
39	10	"The Thanksgiving Story"	George Marshall	Story by : Melvin Levy & Thomas P. Levy; Teleplay by : Raphael Hayes & Melvin Levy & D.D. Beauchamp	November 25, 1965
Daniel's eccentric father-in-law helps Israel catch a turkey and then leads the warring Choctaws into a peaceful trap where all can celebrate Thanksgiving peacefully together.
40	11	"A Rope for Mingo"	John Florea	Raphael Hayes	December 2, 1965
Daniel's effort to save Mingo from a mob intent upon hanging him for killing a white trader's family nearly fail until he can find the real culprit.
41	12	"The First Beau"	John Florea	Barry Trivers	December 9, 1965
Jemima Boone experiences the sweet pangs of first love with a dashing young outlaw, who ends up going straight because of his feelings for her.
42	13	"The Perilous Journey"	John Florea	D.D. Beauchamp	December 16, 1965
Daniel Boone acts as a messenger for the President of the United States, carrying a dispatch confirming the Louisiana purchase, despite opposition by British agents.
43	14	"The Christmas Story"	Maurice Geraghty	Stephen Lord	December 23, 1965
The birth of an Indian child poses a threat to the peace of Boonesborough as Daniel's kindness in giving shelter to the new mother is misinterpreted.
44	15	"The Tamarack Massacre Affair"	James Clark	Story by : David Duncan; Teleplay by : David Duncan & Tom Blackburn	December 30, 1965
Daniel and Mingo undermine a British plot to instigate war between the settlers and the Five Nations of Indians.
45	16	"Gabriel"	Gerd Oswald	David Duncan	January 6, 1966
Daniel and Mingo sabotage a hostile Spanish search for a French Daniel Boone look-alike.
46	17	"Seminole Territory"	John Florea	Stephen Lord	January 13, 1966
The Seminoles are about to go to war at the instigation of a magician who has convinced them he's a god.
47	18	"The Deserter"	Nathan Juran	Robert Bloomfield	January 20, 1966
Bounty hunters who are seeking two army deserters capture young Shawnee Reuben Stone, and by mistake, Daniel Boone.
48	19	"Crisis by Fire"	Bruce Humberstone	Story by : Lee Loeb; Teleplay by : Lee Loeb & David Duncan	January 27, 1966
A smallpox epidemic threatens Boonesborrough, and an ambitious ex-officer in the Continental Army sees a way to use the scourge to gain power.
49	20	"The Gun"	Robert Totten	Raphael Hayes	February 3, 1966
In Pennsylvania, Daniel gets a new gun made and outwits two scoundrels who try to force him to guide them through Indian country.
50	21	"The Prisoners"	John Florea	Robert Bloomfield	February 10, 1966
Escaped Army prisoners hold Daniel's children hostage to force him to aid them in revenge on their former commander, but instead he organizes their capture.
51	22	"The Fifth Man"	George Sherman	Jack Guss	February 17, 1966
Daniel Boone and four companions try to blow up a key bridge on the route to Fort Wayne to prevent the British from capturing the fort.
52	23	"The Gun-Barrel Highway"	John Florea	Tom Blackburn	February 24, 1966
The Shawnees go on the warpath when construction engineers violate an agreement with the tribe and build a highway through Indian hunting grounds.
53	24	"The Search"	Harmon Jones	David Duncan	March 3, 1966
On his way to sell furs in New Orleans, Daniel Boone is ambushed and robbed. While tracking his assailant he becomes involved in a search for pirate gold.
54	25	"Fifty Rifles"	John Florea	William Putman	March 10, 1966
A British army officer steals a wagon carrying fifty rifles that he intends to trade with the Shawnee for a tract of land. Daniel, Mingo and Jerricho must stop them.
55	26	"The Trap"	Gerd Oswald	Story by : Paul King; Teleplay by : D.D, Beauchamp	March 17, 1966
Renegade scalp hunter rob Daniel's cabin and head up river where Mingo and Israel are retrieving furs. Mingo is injured and they grab Israel. Daniel heads out after them.
56	27	"The Accused"	John Florea	David Duncan	March 24, 1966
Sam Thurston (Jerome Thor), a Factor (broker) and his fiancée Lacey (Joanna Moore) stage his death and the burning of his office to cover his embezzlement of company funds and blames it on Daniel Boone. The charge is that Daniel, unhappy about the sale of his furs earlier that day, murdered the factor, robbed the office and burnt it down to cover his crime. The town believes the charge mostly on the testimony of the fiancee. Daniel escapes the jail while waiting for what surely would be a foregone conclusion of a trial. He finds the fiancée on the trail after leaving town, and finds Sam, the supposedly dead man with her. The sheriff catches up with all of them and finds Sam still alive, who confesses the body they found was a company overseer whom Sam had shot when the overseer discovered his embezzlement.
57	28	"Cibola"	Gerd Oswald	Raphael Hayes	March 31, 1966
Daniel and Mingo while hunting have an old man and a boy come into their camp. The old man claims he found the boy and the boy only says one word: "Cibola", the name of a lost city somewhere in the mountains of gold. The old man persuades Daniel and Mingo to help him return the boy to his home although the two suspect the old man is only after the gold thought to be in Cibola. They find the hidden valley and the boy's father, from whom the old man in fact stole the boy. The people living there are the remnants of a French patrol that deserted in search of the fabled city and in fact fought and killed a group of natives with gold jewelry but killed all the natives before they could find out from where they came. The residents decide to kill the three to keep their area from being known but the boy and his father, convinced that Daniel and Mingo only wanted to return the boy, help them to escape. With the residents guarding the only mountain exit they know, the father shows them a second way out if they will take his son and give him a better life than he could have trapped in Cibola.
58	29	"The High Cumberland"	George Sherman	Story by : D.D, Beauchamp; Teleplay by : D.D, Beauchamp & Jack Guss	April 14, 1966
59	30	"The High Cumberland"	George Sherman	Story by : D.D, Beauchamp; Teleplay by : D.D, Beauchamp & Jack Guss	April 21, 1966
Part 1: Daniel Boone leads a wagon caravan toward Kentucky where he plans to construct a settlement. One of the travellers is Rebecca Bryant (Patricia Blair), a bondswoman to Cincinnatus (Dallas McKennon) who will be a storekeeper in the settlement. Jim Santee (Armando Silvestre), a gambler, is also in the party. During an Indian attack, Rebecca takes an arrow to the shoulder and must stay behind in Clinch Station while Daniel contracts with Cash Doyle (Roy Jemson), the outpost's storekeeper, and pays for food and other items needed for the new settlement to survive the upcoming winter. When Daniel and Mingo return to Clint's Station in September to determine why the food and items had not been delivered, he finds the goods much more in demand and Doyle reneging on their earlier deal and payment. The goods that Daniel paid for are already loaded on wagons and intended for another settlement; Daniel takes the wagons and heads for Boonesborough with Jim Santee, Mingo, Rebecca, and the wagon drivers. Part 2: The group meets the people to whom Cash Doyle was going to sell their goods at a higher price. The other group offer lots of gold or the goods but Daniel will not sell to them. Dissension rises among the teamsters. The group eventually arrives in Boonesborough. Episode music by Jerry Wallace.

=== Season 3 (1966–1967) ===
Veronica Cartwright no longer appeared in the show as Jemima Boone (from some reports at the insistence of Patricia Blair)

No. overall	No. in season	Title	Directed by	Written by	Original release date
60	1	"Dan'l Boone Shot a B'ar"	Alex Nicol	Story by : David T. Chantler; Teleplay by : D.D, Beauchamp	September 15, 1966
After a bear kills his father and his brother, a Cletus Mott vows to personally kill it at the sametime that Daniel and Mingo try to track it down on behalf of Boonesborough, leading to Mott vowing to shoot them if they interfere in his hunt.
61	2	"The Allegiances"	Earl Bellamy	Story by : Luanna S. Poole; Teleplay by : David Duncan	September 22, 1966
When a Mohican chief forges an alliance with the British to drive out all settlers from the revolutionary Colonies, Mingo is caught between his loyalty to Daniel Boone and the patriots, and to his own people. A suspicion of Mingo informing Daniel of the plan leads to a British plot to assassinate Daniel Boone.
62	3	"Goliath"	Barry Shear	D.D, Beauchamp	September 29, 1966
When Boonesborough horse trader Otis Cobb is sent to buy draft horses for the town, he instead uses the money to buy an immensely strong slave named Goliath to beat up the gang following him. This leads to a problem for Boonesborough to determine what to do with Goliath and if he can be of any use.
63	4	"Grizzly"	William Wiard	Raphael Hayes	October 6, 1966
After a backwoods trapper is accused of killing a debtor, Daniel must clear his name, with some very unexpected help from Israel.
64	5	"First in War, First in Peace"	Barry Shear	Story by : Frank L. Moss; Teleplay by : D.D, Beauchamp	October 13, 1966
65	6	"Run a Crooked Mile"	Anton Leader	D.D, Beauchamp	October 20, 1966
66	7	"The Matchmaker"	Robert Douglas	Story by : Sam Gilman; Teleplay by : D.D, Beauchamp	October 27, 1966
A spirited and colonially educated Creek princess Little Faun (Brenda Benet) is given to Daniel and Mingo to transport to the Shawnee tribe to marry the son of the tribe's chief to avert a war between the two tribes. The indian princess turns out to be quite a handful for everyone involved. Larie Main and James J Griffith guest as two ne'er-do-wells (Stinch and Coll) that briefly kidnap the princess for ransom only to glady return her after a short time.
67	8	"Onatha"	Earl Bellamy	David Duncan	November 3, 1966
68	9	"The Loser's Race"	William Wiard	Story by : Judith Barrows; Teleplay by : Judith Barrows & D.D, Beauchamp	November 10, 1966
69	10	"The Enchanted Gun"	R. G. Springsteen	Story by : William L. Stuart; Teleplay by : David Duncan & Charles O'Neal & William L. Stuart	November 17, 1966
70	11	"Requiem for Craw Green"	George Sherman	Story by : Sid Harris; Teleplay by : William Driskill	December 1, 1966
71	12	"The Lost Colony"	Alex Nicol	Story by : Ken Pettus; Teleplay by : D.D, Beauchamp & Ken Pettus	December 8, 1966
Daniel and Mingo must escape bondage by descendants of the "Lost Colony of Roanoke"
72	13	"River Passage"	William Witney	D.D, Beauchamp	December 15, 1966
73	14	"When a King Is a Pawn"	Lesley Selander	Story by : William Davis Jr. Teleplay by : David Duncan	December 22, 1966
Daniel and Israel travel with a man, woman, and young boy as Daniel has been hired to drive their stagecoach. Although secretive at first the young boy is France's Louis XIV, fleeing the revolution in France and his certain execution there. As it becomes clear they are being pursued and that all is not as it seems, it becomes also clear that the man is likely to murder the Boones at the end of their journey. Nearing the river Daniel leaves with who he thought was Israel but is in fact Louis. Meeting the followers Daniel turns Louis over to them for protection and rides off to save Israel. At the coach the leader of following party also meets and he and the man in from the coach shoot each other, both revealing neither had good plans for Louis. Madam decides to go to some French settlement in America where she and Louis can live out their lives in the safety of anonymity.
74	15	"The Symbol"	R. G. Springsteen	Story by : W.J. Voorhees; Teleplay by : David Duncan & W.J. Voorhees	December 29, 1966
75	16	"The Williamsburg Cannon"	William Witney	Story by : Raphael Hayes; Teleplay by : D.D, Beauchamp & Raphael Hayes	January 12, 1967
76	17	"The Williamsburg Cannon"	William Witney	Story by : Raphael Hayes; Teleplay by : D.D, Beauchamp & Raphael Hayes	January 19, 1967
77	18	"The Wolf Man"	Earl Bellamy	William Driskill	January 26, 1967
78	19	"The Jasper Ledbedder Story"	William Wiard	Helen McAvity & Martha Wilkerson	February 2, 1967
79	20	"When I Became a Man, I Put Away Childish Things"	Earl Bellamy	Story by : Jack Guss; Teleplay by : Joel Bernard	February 9, 1967
80	21	"The Long Way Home"	Earl Bellamy	D.D, Beauchamp	February 16, 1967
81	22	"The Young Ones"	Gerd Oswald	Story by : Sid Harris; Teleplay by : D.D, Beauchamp	February 23, 1967
82	23	"Delo Jones"	R. G. Springsteen	Clyde Ware	March 2, 1967
83	24	"The Necklace"	Earl Bellamy	David Duncan	March 9, 1967
84	25	"Fort West Point"	Gerd Oswald	Story by : Terry Kingsley-Smith; Teleplay by : D.D, Beauchamp	March 23, 1967
85	26	"Bitter Mission"	R. G. Springsteen	Jim Byrnes	March 30, 1967
86	27	"Take the Southbound Stage"	Gerd Oswald	Story by : Terry Kingsley-Smith; Teleplay by : D.D, Beauchamp	April 6, 1967
87	28	"The Fallow Land"	William Witney	Story by : William Driskill; Teleplay by : D.D, Beauchamp & Terry Kingsley-Smith	April 13, 1967

=== Season 4 (1967–1968) ===
No. overall	No. in season	Title	Directed by	Written by	Original release date
88	1	"The Ballad of Sidewinder and the Cherokee"	Gerd Oswald	Melvin Levy	September 14, 1967
89	2	"The Ordeal of Israel Boone"	James B. Clark	Paul Playdon	September 21, 1967
90	3	"The Renegade"	William Wiard	Story by : Rick Husky; Teleplay by : Rick Husky & David Levy	September 28, 1967
91	4	"Tanner"	John Newland	Raphael Hayes	October 5, 1967
92	5	"Beaumarchais"	Arthur H. Nadel	Story by : Terry Kingsley-Smith; Teleplay by : Richard J. Collins	October 12, 1967
93	6	"The King's Shilling"	Ida Lupino	Joel Oliansky	October 19, 1967
94	7	"The Inheritance"	Nathan Juran	David Duncan	October 26, 1967
95	8	"The Traitor"	William Wiard	Jack B. Sowards	November 2, 1967
96	9	"The Value of a King"	John Newland	Judith Barrows & Robert Guy Barrows	November 9, 1967
97	10	"The Desperate Raid"	Nathan Juran	Story by : Fred De Gorter & Frank Goss Jr. Teleplay by : Harold Medford	November 16, 1967
98	11	"The Spanish Horse"	William Wiard	Story by : Tom W. Blackburn; Teleplay by : D.D, Beauchamp	November 23, 1967
99	12	"Chief Mingo"	Gerd Oswald	Jim Byrnes	December 7, 1967
100	13	"The Secret Code"	William Wiard	Joel Oliansky	December 14, 1967
101	14	"A Matter of Blood"	Nathan Juran	Judith Barrows & Robert Guy Barrows	December 28, 1967
102	15	"The Scrimshaw Ivory Chart"	George Marshall	Story by : Melvin Levy; Teleplay by : Melvin Levy & Thomas P. Levy	January 4, 1968
103	16	"The Imposter"	William Wiard	Merwin Gerard	January 18, 1968
104	17	"The Witnesses"	William Wiard	Rick Husky	January 25, 1968
105	18	"The Flaming Rocks"	Nathan Juran	David Duncan & Lee Karson	February 1, 1968
106	19	"Then Who Will They Hang from the Yardarm If Willy Gets Away?"	Fess Parker	Martha Wilkerson	February 8, 1968
107	20	"The Spanish Fort"	William Wiard	Raphael Hayes	February 15, 1968
108	21	"Hero's Welcome"	Nathan Juran	Story by : Erich Faust; Teleplay by : Joel Oliansky	February 22, 1968
109	22	"Orlando, the Prophet"	William Wiard	Story by : Patricia Bouchard; Teleplay by : Mevlin Levy	February 29, 1968
110	23	"The Far Side of Fury"	William Wiard	Judith Barrows	March 7, 1968
111	24	"Nightmare"	George Marshall	Paul Playdon	March 14, 1968
112	25	"Thirty Pieces of Silver"	Nathan Juran	Story by : Richard J. Collins; Teleplay by : D.D, Beauchamp & Jim Byrnes	March 28, 1968
113	26	"Faith's Way"	Joel Oliansky	Martha Wilkerson	April 4, 1968

=== Season 5 (1968–1969) ===
Ed Ames no longer appeared in seasons 5 and 6.

No. overall	No. in season	Title	Directed by	Written by	Original release date
114	1	"Be Thankful for the Fickleness of Women"	William Wiard	Don Balluck	September 19, 1968
115	2	"The Blackbirder"	William Wiard	Story by : Robert Bloomfield; Teleplay by : D.D, Beauchamp	October 3, 1968
116	3	"The Dandy"	William Wiard	Merwin Gerard	October 10, 1968
117	4	"The Fleeing Nuns"	William Wiard	Story by : Patricia Falkenhagen; Teleplay by : Irve Tunick	October 24, 1968
118	5	"The Plague That Came to Ford's Run"	Fess Parker	Harold Medford	October 31, 1968
119	6	"The Bait"	Nathan Juran	Raphael Hayes	November 7, 1968
120	7	"Big, Black and Out There"	William Wiard	Harry Basch	November 14, 1968
121	8	"Flag of Truce"	William Wiard	Irve Tunick	November 21, 1968
122	9	"The Valley of the Sun"	Nathan Juran	Story by : James Raker; Teleplay by : David Duncan	November 28, 1968
123	10	"The Patriot"	Fess Parker	Melvin Levy	December 5, 1968
124	11	"The Return of Sidewinder"	Nathan Juran	Melvin Levy	December 12, 1968
125	12	"Minnow for a Shark"	Nathan Juran	Nathan Juran	January 2, 1969
126	13	"To Slay a Giant"	Nathan Juran	Story by : Rapahel Hayes; Teleplay by : Raphael Hayes & Arthur Browne Jr.	January 9, 1969
127	14	"A Tall Tale of Prater Beaseley"	George Marshall	Melvin Levy	January 16, 1969
128	15	"Copperhead Izzy"	William Wiard	James Duncan	January 30, 1969
129	16	"Three Score and Ten"	George Marshall	Raphael Hayes	February 6, 1969
130	17	"Jonah"	William Wiard	D.D, Beauchamp	February 13, 1969
131	18	"Bickford's Bridge"	Nathan Juran	Story by : Al Ramrus & John Herman Shaner; Teleplay by : D.D, Beauchamp & Al Ramrus & John Herman Shaner	February 20, 1969
132	19	"A Touch of Charity"	William Wiard	Judith Barrows	February 27, 1969
133	20	"For Want of a Hero"	Lee Philips	Stanley Adams & George F. Slavin	March 6, 1969
134	21	"Love and Equity"	William Wiard	Melvin Levy	March 13, 1969
135	22	"The Allies"	George Marshall	Story by : D.D, Beauchamp & Rick Husky; Teleplay by : D.D, Beauchamp	March 27, 1969
136	23	"A Man Before His Time"	William Wiard	Don Balluck	April 3, 1969
137	24	"For a Few Rifles"	John Newland	Judith Barrows	April 10, 1969
138	25	"Sweet Molly Malone"	William Wiard	Story by : Patricia Falkenhagen & Jack Guss; Teleplay by : Patricia Falkenhagen	April 17, 1969
139	26	"A Pinch of Salt"	William Wiard	Merwin Gerard	May 1, 1969

=== Season 6 (1969–1970) ===
No. overall	No. in season	Title	Directed by	Written by	Original release date
140	1	"A Very Small Rifle"	Nathan Juran	Melvin Levy & Thomas P. Levy	September 18, 1969
141	2	"The Road to Freedom"	William Wiard	Frank L. Moss & Virginia Rooks	October 2, 1969
142	3	"Benvenuto... Who?"	William Wiard	Walter Black	October 9, 1969
143	4	"The Man"	Nathan Juran	Jack Guss	October 16, 1969
144	5	"The Printing Press"	William Wiard	Lionel E. Siegel	October 23, 1969
145	6	"The Traitor"	Nathan Juran	David Duncan	October 30, 1969
146	7	"The Grand Alliance"	Nathan Juran	Judith Barrows	November 13, 1969
147	8	"Target Boone"	William Wiard	Story by : M. Bernard Fox; Teleplay by : D.D, Beauchamp & M. Bernard Fox	November 20, 1969
148	9	"A Bearskin for Jamie Blue"	William Wiard	Frank Chase	November 27, 1969
149	10	"The Cache"	Nathan Juran	Irve Tunick	December 4, 1969
150	11	"The Terrible Tarbots"	Nathan Juran	Harold Medford	December 11, 1969
151	12	"Hannah Comes Home"	Fess Parker	Harry Basch	December 25, 1969
152	13	"An Angel Cried"	Fess Parker	Martha Wilkerson	January 8, 1970
153	14	"Perilous Passage"	Nathan Juran	Lee Karson	January 15, 1970
154	15	"The Sunshine Patriots"	William Wiard	Story by : Merwin Gerard & Jack Guss; Teleplay by : Jack Guss & Rick Husky	January 22, 1970
155	16	"Mama Cooper"	William Wiard	Lionel E. Siegel	February 5, 1970
156	17	"Before the Tall Man"	George Marshall	Albert Beich & William H. Wright	February 12, 1970
157	18	"Run for the Money"	Christian Nyby	Walter Black	February 19, 1970
158	19	"A Matter of Vengeance"	Nathan Juran	Story by : Al Ramrus & John Herman Shaner; Teleplay by : Irve Tunick	February 26, 1970
159	20	"The Landlords"	William Wiard	Melvin Levy	March 5, 1970
160	21	"Readin', Ritin', and Revolt"	William Wiard	Lee Karson	March 12, 1970
161	22	"Noblesse Oblige"	Nathan Juran	David Duncan	March 26, 1970
162	23	"The Homecoming"	Nathan Juran	Melvin Levy	April 9, 1970
163	24	"Bringing Up Josh"	William Wiard	Jack Guss	April 16, 1970
164	25	"How to Become a Goddess"	William Wiard	Story by : Jim Byrnes & Melvin Levy; Teleplay by : Don Balluck & Melvin Levy	April 30, 1970
165	26	"Israel and Love"	Nathan Juran	Melvin Levy	May 7, 1970
