= John E. Anderson =

American businessperson and philanthropist

- Born: September 12, 1917; Minneapolis, Minnesota, U.S.
- Died: July 29, 2011 (aged 93); Los Angeles, California, U.S.
- Education: University of California, Los Angeles (BA); Harvard University (MBA); Loyola Marymount University (JD)
- Occupation: Businessman
- Spouses: Margaret (m. 1942–1965) Marion (m. 1967–2011)
- Children: 5

John Edward Anderson (September 12, 1917 – July 29, 2011) was an American billionaire businessman who was the president and owner of Topa Equities, Ltd. Anderson oversaw more than 40 wholly owned subsidiaries in agriculture, automotive dealerships, insurance, real estate, oil, and wholesale beverage distribution. In 2006, he was ranked #189 on the Forbes magazine list of the 400 richest Americans, with a net worth of $1.9 billion. He made charitable donations to the University of California, Los Angeles, Children's Hospital Los Angeles, and other Southern California educational institutions during his lifetime. Anderson died from pneumonia at the Ronald Reagan UCLA Medical Center.

== Early life and education ==
Anderson was born on September 12, 1917, in Minneapolis, Minnesota. He was the son of a barber. Anderson was the valedictorian of his high school class. Anderson also earned the rank of Eagle Scout in the Boy Scouts of America in 1931. He attended the University of California, Los Angeles from 1936 to 1940, playing on the ice hockey team, and graduating Phi Beta Kappa with a bachelor's degree in business administration. While at UCLA, he was a member of the Beta Theta Pi fraternity. He then attended Harvard Business School on a scholarship, graduating with an M.B.A. after World War II had broken out. While at Harvard, he was a George Fisher Baker Scholar. Anderson entered the military on the staff of an admiral, and passed his CPA exam while in the Navy. Anderson continued his education after the war, earning his J.D. from Loyola Law School in 1950. He graduated first in his class at Loyola, and was offered a full-time teaching position. For the next 25 years, Anderson taught at the law school in mornings and evenings while he worked at his law firm.

== Career ==
Anderson was the founding partner of Kindel & Anderson law firm in 1953. On April 1, 1956, Anderson founded Ace Beverage Co. with exclusive rights to distribute Budweiser in Los Angeles, California. In 1980, he founded Topa Properties, Ltd., which owns high-rise office buildings in Los Angeles, Ventura County, California, and Honolulu, as well as a sizeable amount of property in the US Virgin Islands. His portfolio included 4,000,000 square feet (370,000 m^{2}) of commercial property and 4,500 residential units. He created the Silver Star new car dealership group in Thousand Oaks, California, including Mercedes-Benz, Cadillac, Jaguar and Range Rover. He was a chairman of the YMCA of Metropolitan Los Angeles, a trustee and former president of Saint John's Hospital and Health Center Foundation and trustee of Claremont McKenna College. Anderson was on the Board of Visitors at the Anderson School of Management, which is named after him. Anderson also taught several business courses at UCLA.

Anderson received the Southern California Entrepreneur of the Year award in 1987 and the Master Entrepreneur of the Year in 2002. He was honored as the Business Person of the year by the U.S. Business Hall of Fame in 2002.

== Philanthropy ==
Among his charitable endeavors, Anderson and his wife Marion donated more than $50 million for the construction of a new building for Children's Hospital Los Angeles, where Marion Anderson was a board member. Beginning in 1987, the Andersons donated $42 million to the University of California, Los Angeles.

Anderson received the Distinguished Service Award, Loyola Law School in 1985. Two years later, in 1987, the UCLA Graduate School of Management was renamed the John E. Anderson School of Management after he donated $15 million He received the Outstanding Individual Philanthropist on National Philanthropy Day award in 1989 He also received the UCLA Alumnus of the Year award and the UCLA Medal in 1995. In 2002, he received the John E. Anderson Distinguished Alumnus Award from the UCLA John E. Anderson School of Management He received the Humanitarian Award from the National Conference for Community and Justice in 2004.

== Personal life ==
In 1942, Anderson married his UCLA sweetheart, Margaret Stewart, and they had five children. Margaret died of cancer in 1965, and he married Marion in 1967. His daughter Debbie died at the age of seventeen in a car accident in 1969. Anderson's son John Jr. is an executive vice president of Topa Equities, Ltd., his daughter Judith manages the agricultural ranch in Ojai, California. His sons also manage the family's beverage distribution and automotive businesses. He resided in the East Gate Bel Air section of Los Angeles, California.

== Death and legacy ==
Anderson died on July 29, 2011. He had 15 grandchildren and ten great-grandchildren. His widow Marion ran the Marion & John E. Anderson Foundation charity. On May 14, 2015, she donated $100 million to the UCLA Anderson School. She died on May 14, 2017.

Educational offices
Preceded by Calvin Perry Stone	52nd President of the American Psychological Association; 1943–44	Succeeded by Gardner Murphy
