= Ed Hinton (actor) =

American film and television actor (1919–1958)

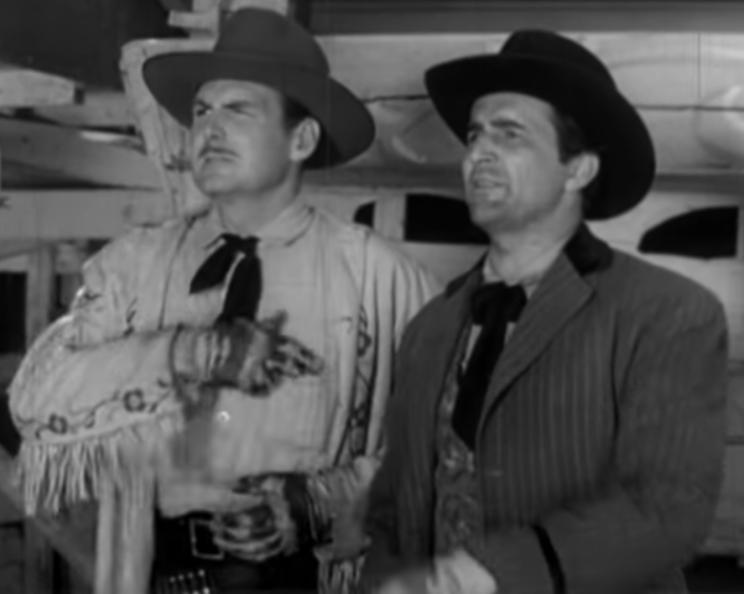
- Hinton (left) with Rick Vallin in The Adventures of Champion, 1955
- Born: Edgar Latimer Hinton; March 26, 1919; North Carolina, U.S.
- Died: October 12, 1958 (aged 39); Los Angeles County, California, U.S.
- Occupations: Film and television actor
- Years active: 1938–1958
- Spouse: Marilynn Mau
- Children: 3; including Daryn and Darby

Edgar Latimer Hinton (March 26, 1919 – October 12, 1958) was an American film and television actor. He was known for playing Special Agent Henderson in the American drama television series I Led 3 Lives.

Hinton was born in North Carolina. In 1938 he made his first screen appearance in the film Spring Madness, which starred Maureen O'Sullivan and Lew Ayres. He made an appearance to the 1948 film Harpoon. In 1953, he made his television debut in the television series Boston Blackie. In the same year, he played Special Agent Henderson in I Led 3 Lives.

Hinton appeared in numerous films such as Samson and Deliah (1949); I Was a Communist for the FBI (1951); Leadville Gunslinger (1952); The Hitch-Hiker (1953); River of No Return (1954); The Man from Bitter Ridge (1955); Walk the Proud Land (1956); Escape from Red Rock (1957), and Good Day for a Hanging (1959).

Hinton guest-starred in television programs including Space Patrol, Wagon Train, Sky King, The Life and Legend of Wyatt Earp, Tales of Wells Fargo, Sugarfoot, The Adventures of Rin Tin Tin, Tombstone Territory, Death Valley Days, Tales of the Texas Rangers and Perry Mason.

He died in October 1958 in a plane crash at Santa Catalina Island in Los Angeles County, California, at the age of 39. His pilot, Vincent Pardew and a fellow passenger, Marcella Crum, died along with Hinton. After his death, his son Darby starred in the action and adventure television series Daniel Boone.
