= De Neve Square Park =

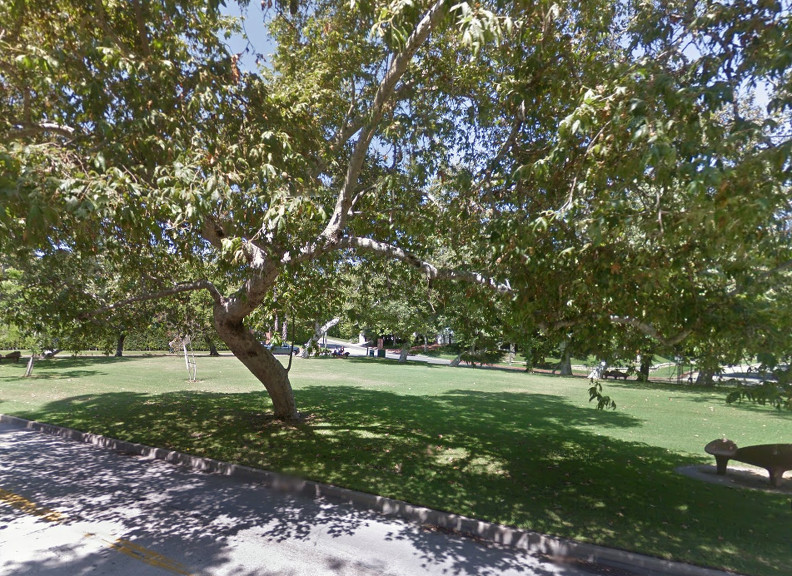

- Location within the Los Angeles metropolitan area Location within California Location within the United States
- Type: Municipal
- Location: Holmby Hills, Los Angeles
- Coordinates: 34.0847°N 118.4348°W
- Open: From dawn to dusk

De Neve Square Park is an urban pocket park located in the neighborhood of Holmby Hills in West Los Angeles, Los Angeles, California. It is located at the northern terminus of Mapleton Drive where it meets Saint Pierre Road at Beverly Glen Boulevard, where Holmby Hills borders East Gate Bel Air to the west. The trapezoidal (rather than square) park is ringed by mature sycamore trees as well as English-style street lamps from the 1920s (created exclusively for Holmby Hills). De Neve Square Park is one of two parks in Holmby Hills (the other being Holmby Park).

== History ==
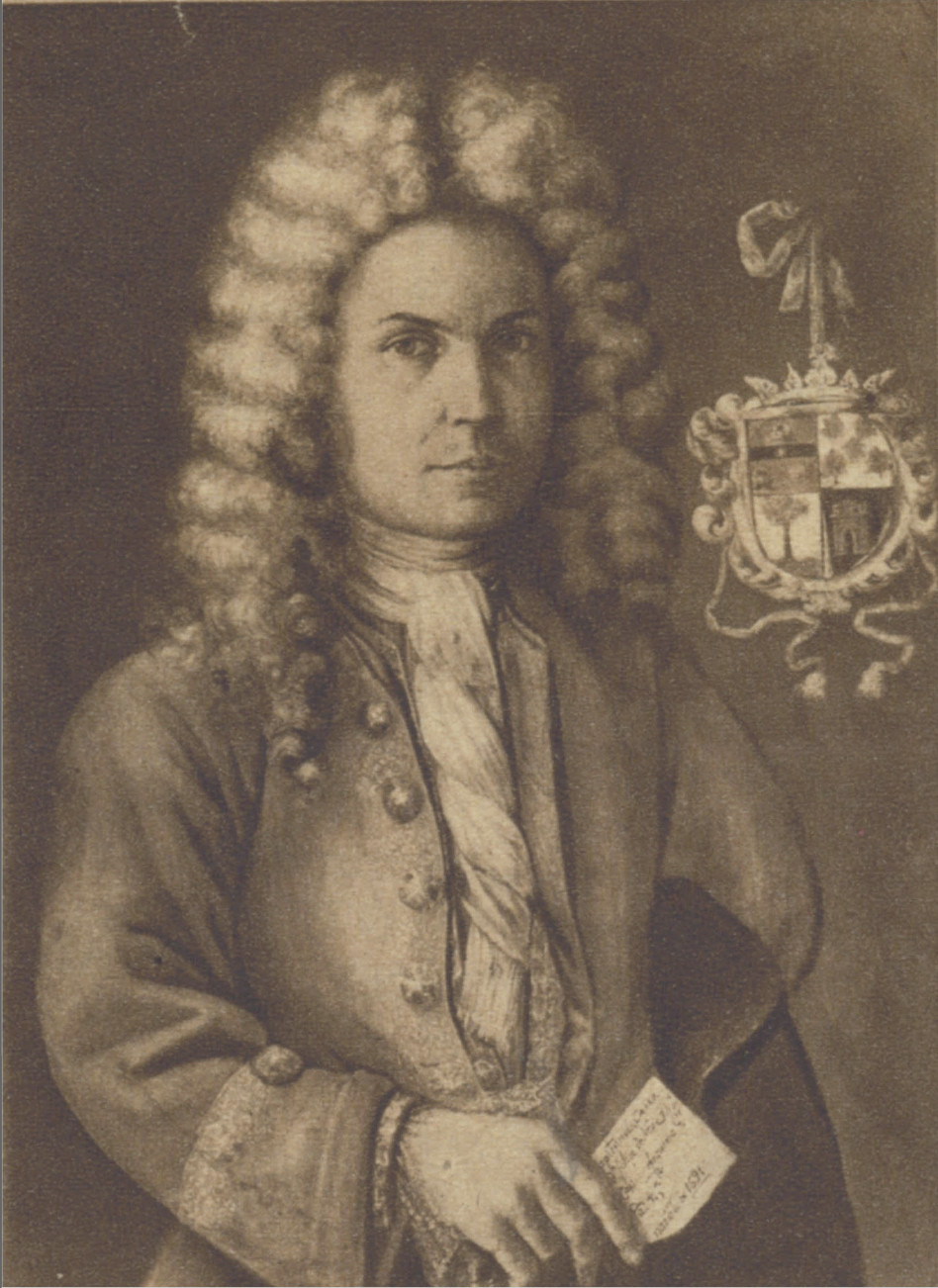
The park is named after Felipe de Neve, founder of Los Angeles and 4th Governor of the Californias.

De Neve Square Park is dedicated to the memory of Felipe de Neve, regarded as the founder of Los Angeles in 1781.

De Neve Square Park has a very prominent history as the location of Elvis Presley's regular organized touch-football games during the 1950s and 60s when he was residing in Los Angeles making films.

== See also ==
- List of parks in Los Angeles
