= Frank Siedel =

American writer, historian, educator, and broadcaster

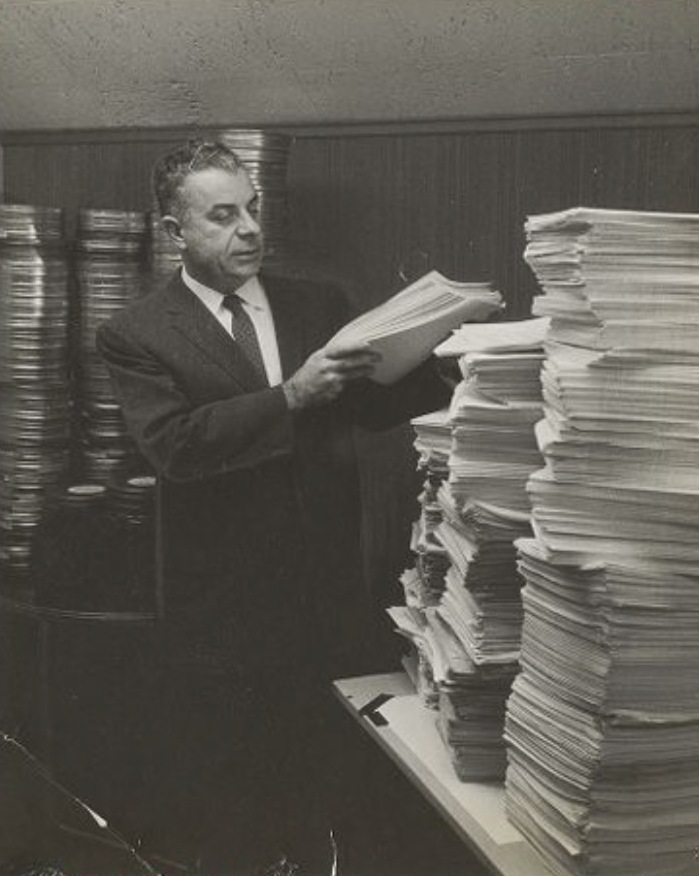
- Siedel with his radio and TV scripts
- Born: Elmer Frank Siedel; September 5, 1914; Strongsville, Ohio, U.S.
- Died: May 9, 1988 (aged 73); Catawba Island, Ohio, U.S.
- Occupations: Writer, historian, educator, and broadcaster
- Years active: 1936–1988
- Spouse(s): Alyce Louise van den Mooter and Mardith Ray Jacobson (later Hany)

Frank Siedel (September 5, 1914 – May 9, 1988) was an American writer, historian, educator, and broadcaster. Siedel wrote over 1,500 movie, radio, and television scripts, and six books including two historical novels: The Ohio Story and Out of The Midwest.

In 1947, Siedel created and wrote the first scripts for The Ohio Story radio program. For five years, the 15-minute show was broadcast live three days a week from WTAM's studios in Cleveland to a network of Ohio radio stations. In 1952, the format changed to 10 minutes a night, and the shows were pre-recorded for distribution to 20 Ohio radio stations. "Captain Dodge's Uncommon Courage," the last radio show, aired on December 29, 1955.

In 1953, Siedel initiated a weekly television version of "The Ohio Story. For two years, the Ohio Story radio and TV episodes overlapped. One hundred seventy-five Ohio Story TV episodes were produced.

The Ohio Story radio-TV series (1947–1961) is said to be the longest-running scripted regional radio/TV show of its time. Two of Siedel's six books, The Ohio Story and Out of the Midwest, were offshoots of the radio and television series.

Two other television series written by Siedel were the 1952-1954 half-hour program "Prescription for Living," produced by Standard Oil of Ohio with the Cleveland Academy of Medicine, and the 1968 "Ohio Heritage" series of eleven 15-minute black-and-white films produced by Standard Oil of Ohio for early Educational TV (ETV). "Prescriptions for Living" won the American Federation of Radio and Television Artists award in 1953, 1954, and 1955 for the most outstanding public service program in Ohio.

In 1965, Siedel created Salespoint, a sales training program, for the Westinghouse Electric Corporation, one of his biggest clients. Using compact cassette recorders, then a brand-new technology originally meant for office dictation, Siedel produced monthly 60-minute audio programs that salespeople could listen to in their cars as they drove between appointments. Scripts were written, professionally narrated and recorded, duplicated onto hundreds of cassettes, and mailed out on a subscription basis. The program ran for at least ten years. Its mobility, direct delivery to listeners, and inventive use of new technology make Salespoint a legitimate ancestor of the modern podcast.

== Early life ==
The son of Frank and Mary Ann Junglas Siedel, Frank Siedel was born in Strongsville, Ohio. Siedel attributed his home-spun storytelling style of writing to his experiences listening to the pot-bellied stove storytellers in his father's general store. He began his scriptwriting career in 1936 as a freelance writer, working for radio stations WHKC in Columbus, Ohio and WCAE in Pittsburgh, Pennsylvania. In 1940, he took a job with ESCAR Motion Pictures in Cleveland. When World War II broke out, he wrote scripts for over 100 armed forces training films.

The first ten years of his journalism career, Siedel wrote freelance radio scripts for such shows as the Kate Smith Hour, the Rudy Vallee show, Just Plain Bill, and Cavalcade of America shows before organizing his own firm, Storycraft, Inc. in 1947, where he worked until his death in 1988.

== Cinécraft and Storycraft years ==
In 1946, Siedel began working with Cinécraft Productions as a screenwriter and a year later founded Storycraft, Inc., a Cleveland-based scriptwriting company. Storycraft launched the careers of many young writers. Bill Ellis and Jerry Turk were the first to join Siedel in Storycraft, Inc. Later, he added Lee Templeton, Leo Trefzger, Fred Lipp, Jan Hofstetter, and others. Storycraft became famous throughout the country for its radio and television shows as well as the industrial and commercial films they produced from the company’s founding in 1947.

== Personal life ==
A longtime resident of Rocky River, Ohio, Siedel served as president of that suburb's board of education and, in 1955, was elected to the first State of Ohio Board of Education, where he successfully fought to have Ohio history taught in public schools.

Siedel was married twice. Alyce Louise van den Mooter (1911–1978) and Siedel had three children: sons James and Jonathan and daughter Jeri Siedel Audiano. In 1982, he married Mardith Ray Jacobson [later Hany]. He died on Catawba Island, Ohio in 1988 and is buried in the Catawba Island Cemetery.

In 2019, the Hagley Museum and Library started a project to digitize and post online the movies and TV episodes Siedel produced through Cinécraft Productions.

== Publications ==
- Siedel, Frank (1950). The Ohio Story. Cleveland, Ohio: World Publishing Co.
- Siedel, Frank (January 1, 1953). Out of the Midwest: More Chapters in the Ohio Story. Cleveland, Ohio: World Publishing Co.
- Siedel, Frank, Frank G. Hoover and Bill Ellis (1955). Fabulous Dustpan: The Story of the Hoover. Cleveland, Ohio: World Publishing Co.
- Siedel, Frank and James M. (1968). Pioneers in Science. Boston, MA: Houghton Mifflin.
- Ellis, William Donohue and Frank Siedel (January 1, 1956). How to Win the Conference. Englewood Cliffs, NJ: Prentice-Hall.
- Siedel, Frank and James M. Siedel, The Ohio Heritage Library (Jan. 1, 1963) Publisher: The Standard Oil Company of Ohio (SOHIO)

== Notable Siedel TV and radio episodes ==
- 1939 Crusade. Wayside Theatre, a popular US old-time radio dramatic series featuring romantic comedies and lighthearted misadventures.
- 1946 Crystal Clear. Sponsor: Fostoria Glass Company
- 1947–1953 Ohio Story radio episodes. Sponsor: Ohio Bell Telephone Company
- 1947 Naturally, It's FM. Sponsor: General Electric Company
- 1947 A Name You Can Trust in Rubber. Sponsor: Seiberling Rubber Company
- 1948 Miracle on Mulberry Street. Sponsor: Seiberling Rubber Company
- 1948 Moulders of Progress. Sponsor: Eljer Plumbing Company
- 1950 A Day at the Federal Reserve Bank. Sponsor: Federal Reserve Bank of Cleveland
- 1950 Let's Explore Ohio TV series. Sponsor: Standard Oil of Ohio (SOHIO)
- 1950 Pennywise Guy on Mulberry Street. Sponsor: Seiberling Rubber Company
- 1950 The Year Nobody Gave. Sponsor: United Fund of Allegheny County
- 1951 Fasteners for Progress. Sponsor: Tinnerman Products Inc.
- 1952–1961 Ohio Story TV Series. Sponsor: Ohio Bell Telephone Company
- 1952-1954 Prescriptions for Living radio series. Sponsor: Standard Oil of Ohio (SOHIO) and the Cleveland Academy of Medicine
- 1953 Freedom's Proving Grounds. Sponsor: Standard Oil of Ohio (SOHIO)
- 1954 Milestones of Motoring. Sponsor: Standard Oil of Ohio (SOHIO)
- 1954 The Builders. Sponsor: Wire Reinforcement Institute. With Bill Ellis
- 1954 Young Mother Hubbard. Sponsor: Republic Steel Corporation's Berger Manufacturing Division
- 1955 Land of Promise. Sponsor: Cleveland Electric Illuminating Company
- 1959 Case Closed. Sponsor: Cleveland Department of Public Welfare
- 1959 Cleveland World Port. Sponsor: Cleveland Electric Illuminating Company
- 1960 Integrity. Sponsor: Westinghouse Atomic Power and the U.S. Navy. Won awards in the Industrial Film Section of the New York festival, top honors as the best employee relations movie of the year at the Sales Executive Film Festival, and another first at the Brussels Festival International for Industrial Films.
- 1961 Letter to Youngstown. Sponsor: Youngstown Sheet & Tube. Copies of the movie are posted on the internet. Frank Siedel and his company, Storycraft, are listed in the film credits
- 1962 Cleveland City on Schedule. Sponsor: Cleveland Development Foundation
- 1964 Invitation to Ohio. Sponsor: Ohio Bell Telephone Company
- 1964 Search. Sponsor: Youngstown Sheet and Tube
- 1966 Cover the Earth. Sponsor: Sherwin-Williams Company
- 1968 Ohio Heritage TV Series: Sponsor Standard Oil of Ohio (SOHIO)
- 1970 Projection 70 TV Series. Sponsor: Standard Oil of Ohio (SOHIO)
- 1970 The Spoilers. Sponsor: Super Market Institute
- 1976 Work in Progress. Sponsor: American Iron and Steel Institute
- 1978 Looking Good. Sponsor: Bonne Bell Company
