= Daniel Boone (1964 TV series) =

American action-adventure television series (1964–1970)

- Genre: Action-adventure
- Starring: Fess Parker; Patricia Blair; Albert Salmi; Ed Ames; Rosey Grier; Jimmy Dean; Darby Hinton; Veronica Cartwright; Robert Logan; Dallas McKennon
- Theme music composer: Lionel Newman; Ken Darby
- Composers: Lionel Newman; Alexander Courage; Herman Stein; Joseph Mullendore
- Country of origin: United States
- Original language: English
- No. of seasons: 6
- No. of episodes: 165 (list of episodes)

Production
- Executive producer: Aaron Rosenberg
- Producers: Barney Rosenzweig; Ted Schilz; George Sherman; Joseph Silver
- Running time: 60 minutes
- Production companies: 20th Century-Fox Television; Arcola Pictures Corp. Fespar Enterprises, Inc., in association with NBC-TV

Original release
- Network: NBC
- Release: September 24, 1964 – May 7, 1970

Daniel Boone is an American action-adventure television series, starring Fess Parker as the frontiersman Daniel Boone, that aired from September 24, 1964, to May 7, 1970, on NBC for 165 episodes, and was produced by 20th Century Fox Television, Arcola Enterprises, and Fespar Corp. Ed Ames co-starred as Mingo, Boone's Cherokee friend, for the first four seasons of the series. Albert Salmi portrayed Boone's companion Yadkin in season one only. Country Western singer-actor Jimmy Dean was a featured actor as Josh Clements during the 1968–1970 seasons. Actor and former NFL football player Rosey Grier made regular appearances as Gabe Cooper in the 1969 to 1970 season. The show was broadcast "in living color" beginning in fall 1965, the second season, and was shot entirely in California and Kanab, Utah. The show was highly fictionalized with very little historical accuracy.

An earlier television series based on Daniel Boone appeared on the Walt Disney Presents anthology in 1960, with Dewey Martin as Boone.

== Characters ==
=== Main characters ===
- Daniel Boone – The title character of the series, played by Fess Parker
- Rebecca Boone – Daniel's wife, played by Patricia Blair
- Jemima Boone – Boone's daughter, played by Veronica Cartwright (Season 1–2)
- Israel Boone – Boone's son, played by Darby Hinton
- Mingo – Boone's companion and an Oxford-educated half-British Native American – played by Ed Ames (Seasons 1–4)
- Cincinnatus – The store-keeper and a fixture of Boonsborough village life, played by Dallas McKennon.

== Episodes ==
Season	Episodes	Originally released		Color	DVD release date
Season	Episodes	First released	Last released	Color	DVD release date
1	29	September 24, 1964	April 29, 1965	Black & White	September 26, 2006
2	30	September 16, 1965	April 21, 1966	Color	September 26, 2006
3	28	September 15, 1966	April 13, 1967	Color	May 8, 2007
4	26	September 14, 1967	April 4, 1968	Color	June 19, 2007
5	26	September 19, 1968	May 1, 1969	Color	August 7, 2007
6	26	September 18, 1969	May 7, 1970	Color	November 18, 2008

== Background ==
Daniel Boone was one of two significant historical figures played by Fess Parker. He previously appeared as Davy Crockett in a series of episodes of the Walt Disney anthology television series, to considerable acclaim amid the launch of a national craze. For his role as Boone, which lasted much longer, but had far less impact, Parker again wore a coonskin cap, which had been popularized years earlier by the Crockett shows. Daniel Boone's headgear was even mentioned in the show's theme song: "From the coonskin cap on the top of ol' Dan....". Efforts had been made to secure the rights to Crockett from Walt Disney, but Disney refused to sell, so the series wound up being about Boone instead.

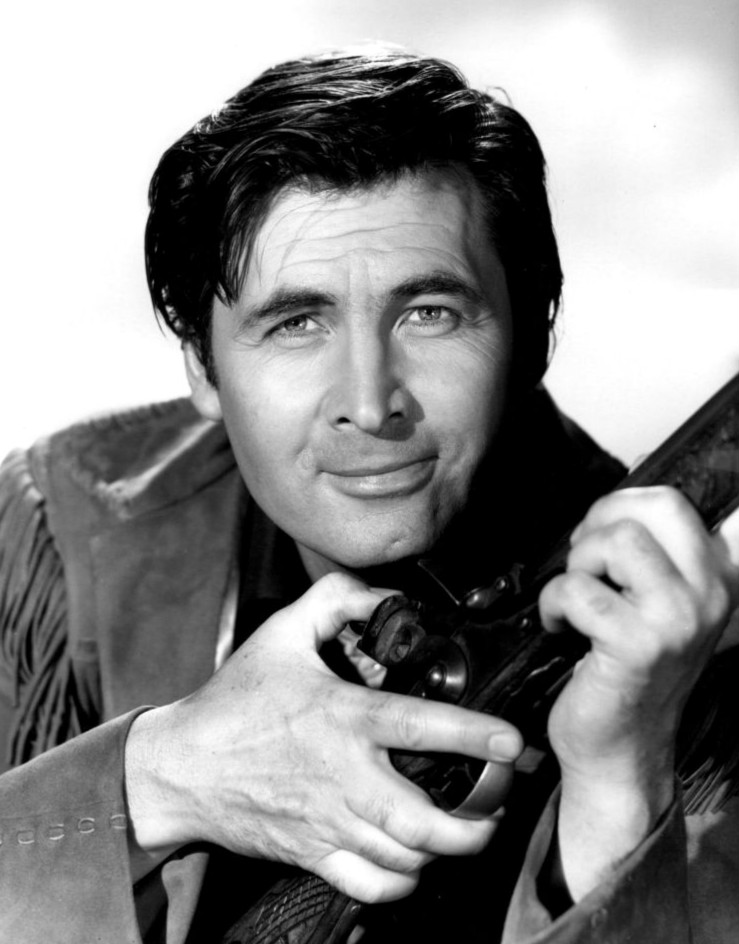
Parker as Daniel Boone

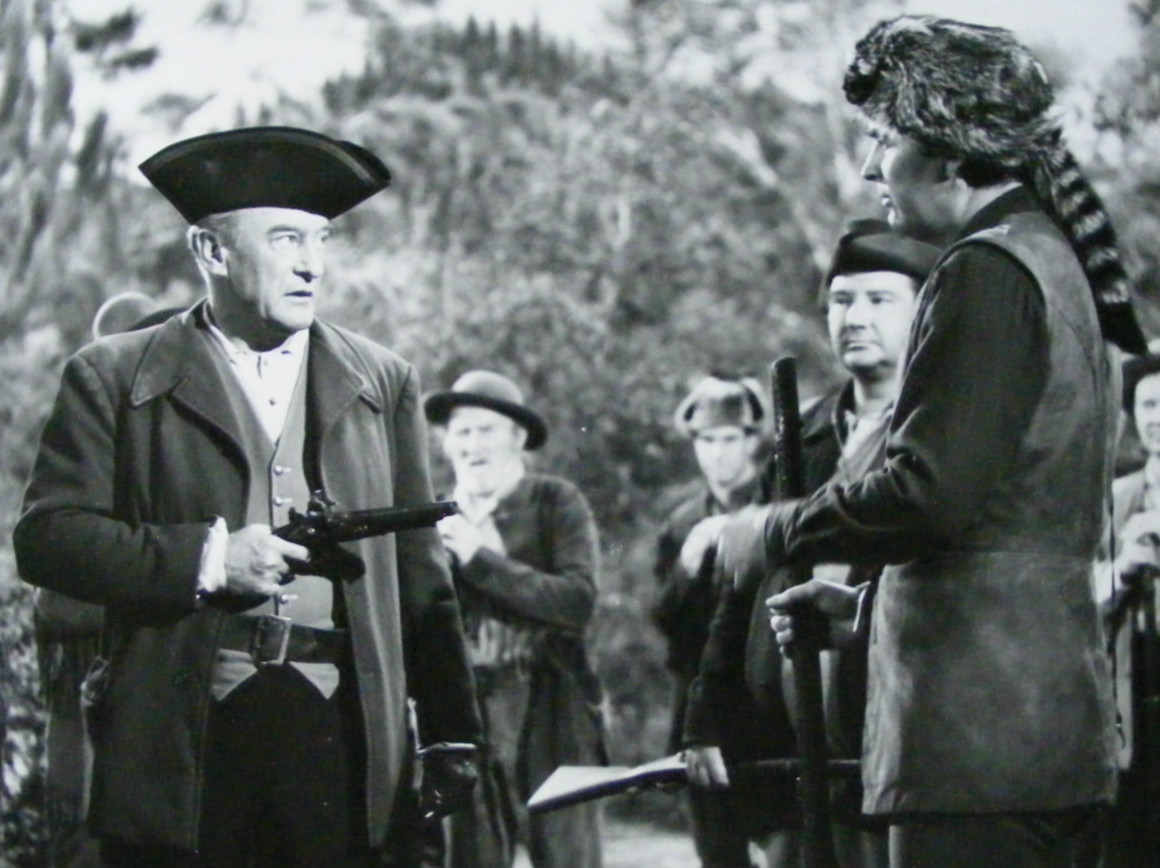
Parker with guest star George Sanders, 1966

In contrast, Parker's Boone was less of an explorer and more a family man than Parker's Crockett. Parker as Crockett also generally wore a light beard, whereas his Boone was predominantly clean-shaven. Boone's wife Rebecca (played by Patricia Blair) and son Israel (Darby Hinton) were often featured in the stories. In reality, Boone had 10 children. During the first two seasons, his daughter Jemima was shown (played by Veronica Cartwright), but she disappeared with no explanation toward the end of the second season. Western actor Chris Alcaide appeared twice on the series, once as an Indian, Flathead Joseph. Walter Coy made his last major television appearance in 1970 on Daniel Boone in the role of Chief Blackfish. Rico Alaniz played the Indian Crooked Hand in the 1969 episode "The Allies". Med Flory was cast in seven episodes, the last three in the role of the drifter Bingen.

The series is set in the 1770s and 1780s, just before, during, and after the American Revolution, and mostly centered on fictional adventures in and about Boonesborough, Kentucky. Nearly all of the aspects of the show were less than historically faithful and completely fictional, which at one point led the Kentucky legislature to condemn the inaccuracies. The series' story line does not follow historical events; instead, story lines run back and forth concerning historical events. Inconsistencies include episodes such as "The Aaron Burr Story," a second-season episode in which the former Vice President of the United States visits Boonesborough. The episode was based on Burr's raising an armed group, allegedly to commit treason, in 1806. Meanwhile, another episode in the second season hinged on allegations that the Boonesborough settlers were planning insurrection against the British Crown, prior to the American Revolution. Still other episodes took place during the Revolutionary War. No explanation was made for the 30-year discrepancy.

The character Caramingo, shortened to Mingo, was half-Cherokee, but highly educated somewhat in the Tonto mold, but with updated sensibilities and English descent through his father, the fourth Earl of Dunmore. (The 12th Earl now lives in Tasmania, Australia.). (A graduate of Oxford University, Mingo passed as a British officer in at least two episodes, and sang opera in another.) In reality, the Mingo were a small group of natives (and not one man) who were related to the Iroquois. (However, from the native perspective, mingo is a word for "chief" in the Choctaw native language; in Chickasaw, minko is the word for "chief"). Ames also portrayed Mingo's evil twin brother, Taramingo, in "My Brother's Keeper". His role as Mingo led to a famous tomahawk-throwing demonstration on The Tonight Show, that was rerun on anniversary clip shows for decades afterward, in which Ames threw a tomahawk at a target of a man and the hatchet landed between the cutout's legs, much to host Johnny Carson's amusement; this incident was later spoofed in a 1980 episode of SCTV.

Mingo's character resembles Joseph Brant; Brant was a Mohawk Indian, who became a captain in the British Army. His sister, Molly, was the consort of Sir William Johnson, of Johnstown, Montgomery County, New York. Johnson took an interest in Molly's younger brother, acting as a surrogate father, and sent him to Moore's Indian Charity School, the precursor to Dartmouth College. Brant was, therefore, well educated for men of his time, and exceptionally well educated for a Mohawk. A project in later years was to work on a Mohawk translation of the Bible. Brant's parents were both American Indians, unlike Mingo. Brant, despite his role in the American Revolution, is largely unknown outside Central New York, although he is a national hero in Canada. In Ontario, along Lake Ontario's shores, between Toronto and Niagara Falls, a town and hospital are named after him. A replica of his Canadian home is located next to Joseph Brant Memorial Hospital.

Any similarities possibly are coincidental. Boone's character needed an American Indian companion, and as the show was produced in the United States, the character needed to support the rebelling colonists to be believable as Boone's friend. Giving Mingo an education, a better one, incidentally, than Fess Parker's Boone, distanced Mingo from the traditional Western violent, uneducated savage stereotype. If creators were unaware of Moore's Indian Charity School, a British father would have been the easiest way to explain Mingo's background. Status in some Indian tribes is through women. An Indian mother and a British officer father provided status in both worlds. Nothing indicates that Brant was the basis for Mingo, and differences are notable, starting with Brant's stance as a Loyalist, but Mingo closely resembles Brant. (In many ways, having an educated background and a European father was more similar to another Iroquois diplomat, John "Cornplanter" Abeel, the son of a Seneca mother and a Dutch-American father, descended from colonial politician Johannes Abeel.)

One oddity to the show was that Parker's Boone rarely used a horse for transportation. He instead walked to his destinations, sometimes incurring interstate travel.

== Production ==
Parts of the series were filmed in Kane County, Utah.

=== Music ===
The show's main title featured three versions of the theme song written by Vera Matson and Lionel Newman (although the lyrics were written by Ken Darby, credited under the name of his wife Matson). The third "groovy version" was sung by The Imperials.

== Release ==
=== Home media ===
Liberation Entertainment (distributed by Goldhil Home Media) released all six seasons on DVD in Region 1 for the first time between 2006 and 2008.

On September 23, 2014, 20th Century Fox Home Entertainment released Daniel Boone- The Complete Series: 50th Anniversary Collector's Edition on DVD in Region 1 via amazon.com's CreateSpace program. This is a manufacture-on-demand release, available exclusively through amazon.com.

On January 8, 2016, it was announced that Shout! Factory had acquired the rights to the series in Region 1. They have subsequently released new collector's editions of the first five seasons on DVD. The sixth and final season was re-released on December 19, 2017.

DVD name	Ep #	Release date
Season One	13	September 26, 2006; April 19, 2016 (re-release)
Season Two	22	September 26, 2006; July 19, 2016 (re-release)
Season Three	20	May 8, 2007; January 24, 2017 (re-release)
Season Four	26	June 19, 2007; March 14, 2017 (re-release)
Season Five	23	August 7, 2007; May 2, 2017 (re-release)
Season Six	23	November 18, 2008; December 19, 2017 (re-release)
The Complete Series	103	September 23, 2014

=== Syndication ===
As of August 2022, Daniel Boone airs on INSP. The series is also occasionally aired on over-the-air broadcast channel Heroes & Icons in weekend binge blocks, FETV, and joined the new over-the-air broadcast network WEST when it launched on September 29, 2025.

== See also ==
- List of films about the American Revolution
- Young Dan'l Boone
