= Darby Hinton =

American actor (born 1957)

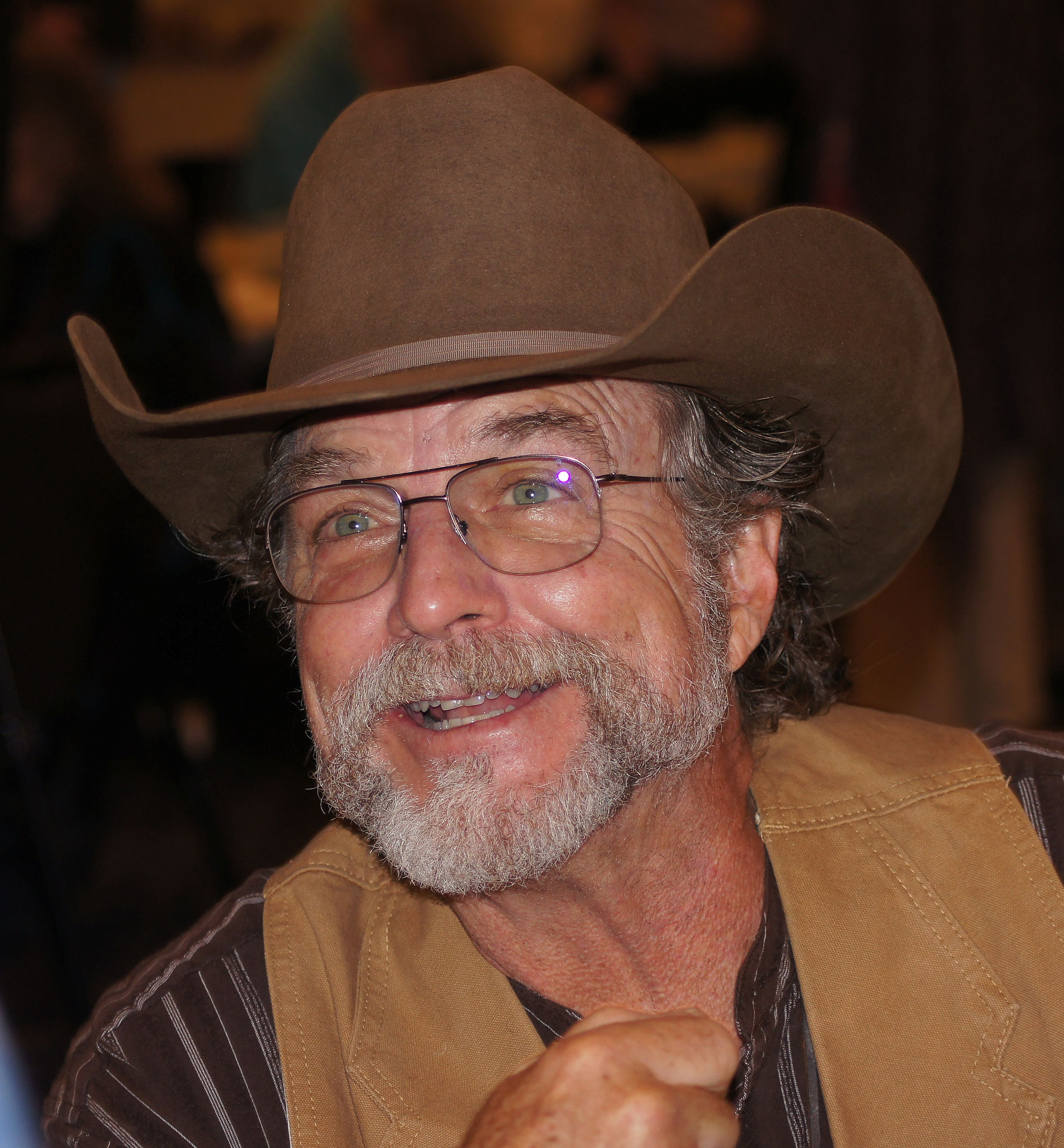
- Hinton in 2019
- Born: Edgar Raymond Darby Hinton; August 19, 1957 (age 69); Santa Monica, California, U.S.
- Occupation: Actor
- Years active: 1962–present
- Parent(s): Ed and Marilynn Hinton
- Relatives: Daryn Hinton (sister)

Edgar Raymond Darby Hinton (born August 19, 1957) is an American actor. His parents were actor Ed Hinton (1919–1958) and Marilyn Mau Hinton (1922–1982). Both of his sisters, Darcy and Daryn Hinton, were actresses from childhood. Hinton is best known for playing Israel Boone on Daniel Boone.

== Acting career ==
Hinton’s acting debut was as an infant in a 1958 Playhouse 90 episode with his father. In 1962 he played a four-year-old boy in Hero's Island and a reviewer stated he and six-year-old Morgan Mason were natural child actors. His other early roles were on Mister Ed, Route 66, Wagon Train, and The Adventures of Ozzie and Harriet.

When Hinton was six years old, his mother dropped him off at 20th-Century Fox to audition for a part in The Sound of Music, and then she went to park the car. Hinton made a mistake, stood in line for Daniel Boone auditions, and so impressed the casting department that he was signed for the role of Israel Boone, though they had been looking for an older boy for the part. He was on the series from 1964 to 1970, and became especially close to Fess Parker, who played his father. Hinton had been only a year old when his own father died, and Parker became a father figure to him.

After Daniel Boone ended, Hinton continued acting. He was in the 1978 film Goodbye, Franklin High, the 1979 ABC special When the West Was Fun: A Western Reunion, the 1981 martial arts film Firecracker and the 1985 film Malibu Express. From 1985 to 1986, Hinton played Ian Griffith on Days of Our Lives. In 2015, Hinton appeared as David G. Burnet in Texas Rising, which was shown on History, and in 2019 he played Philip Fuller in the Hallmark Channel film Christmas Wishes and Mistletoe Kisses.

== Personal life ==
In 1983, Hinton married Diannale Preisman. The couple had two children, Nick and Dakota, before divorcing. He later married Shan Griffiths, and had two more children, Ryder and India.
