= Ray Culley =

Studio owner (1904–1983)

- Born: Raymond F. Culley; October 12, 1904; Norwalk, Ohio U.S.
- Died: September 18, 1983 (aged 78); Cleveland, Ohio U.S.
- Occupations: Actor; Director; Producer; Studio co-founder
- Years active: 1930–1970
- Spouse: Betty Buehner (m. 1939)
- Children: 3

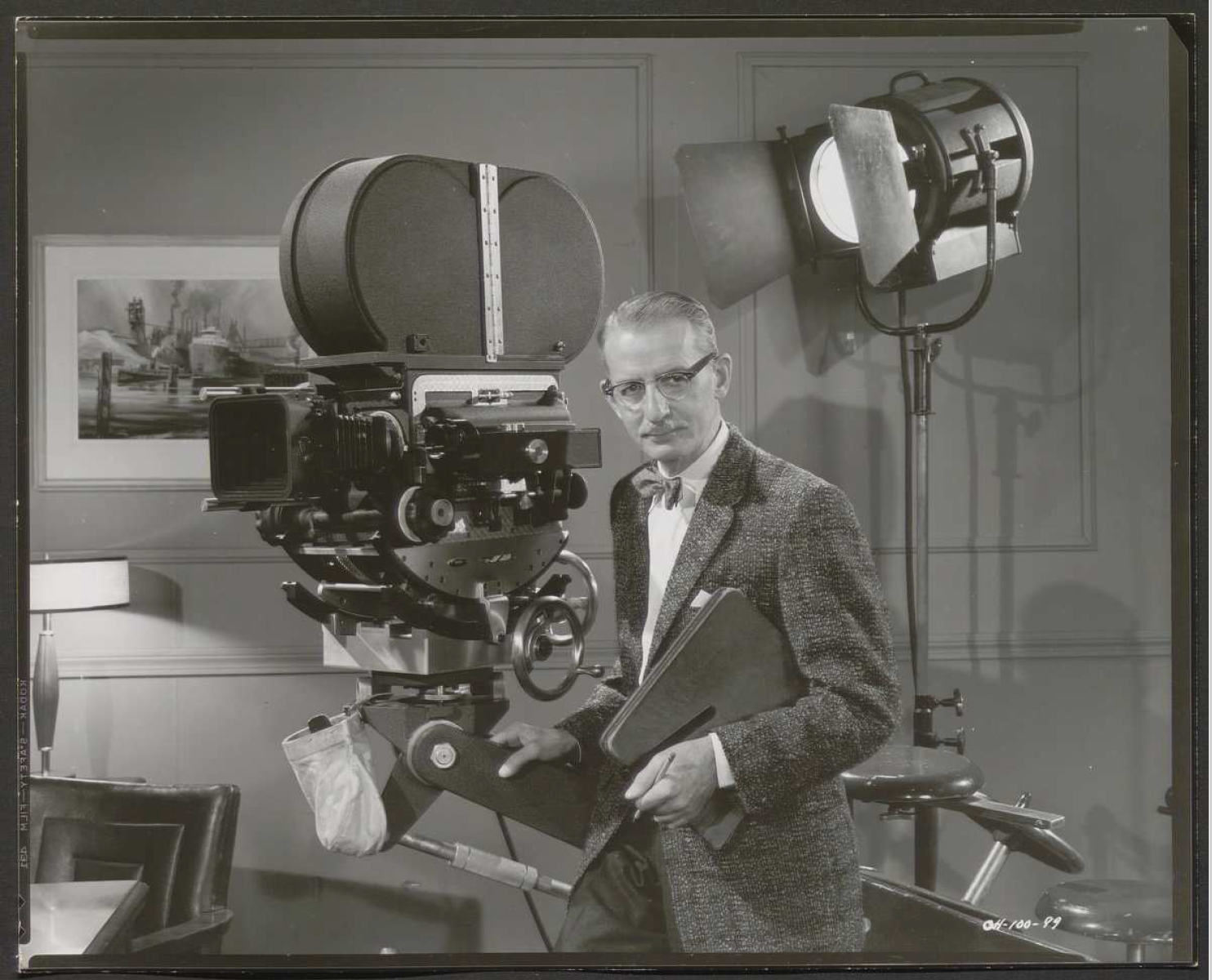
Ray Culley in 1960. Photo courtesy of the Hagley Museum & Library.

Raymond F. Culley (October 12, 1904 - September 18, 1983) and his wife, Betty (Buehner) Culley (May 16, 1914 – June 4, 2016), co-founded Cinécraft Productions, Inc., a sponsored film studio, in 1939. Promoting "Sound Business Pictures in Natural Color," Cinécraft specialized in producing films and slide shows for businesses.

The Culleys were early users of multiple-camera setups with teleprompters to film the same scene from different angles simultaneously. They called their technique Cinéscope.

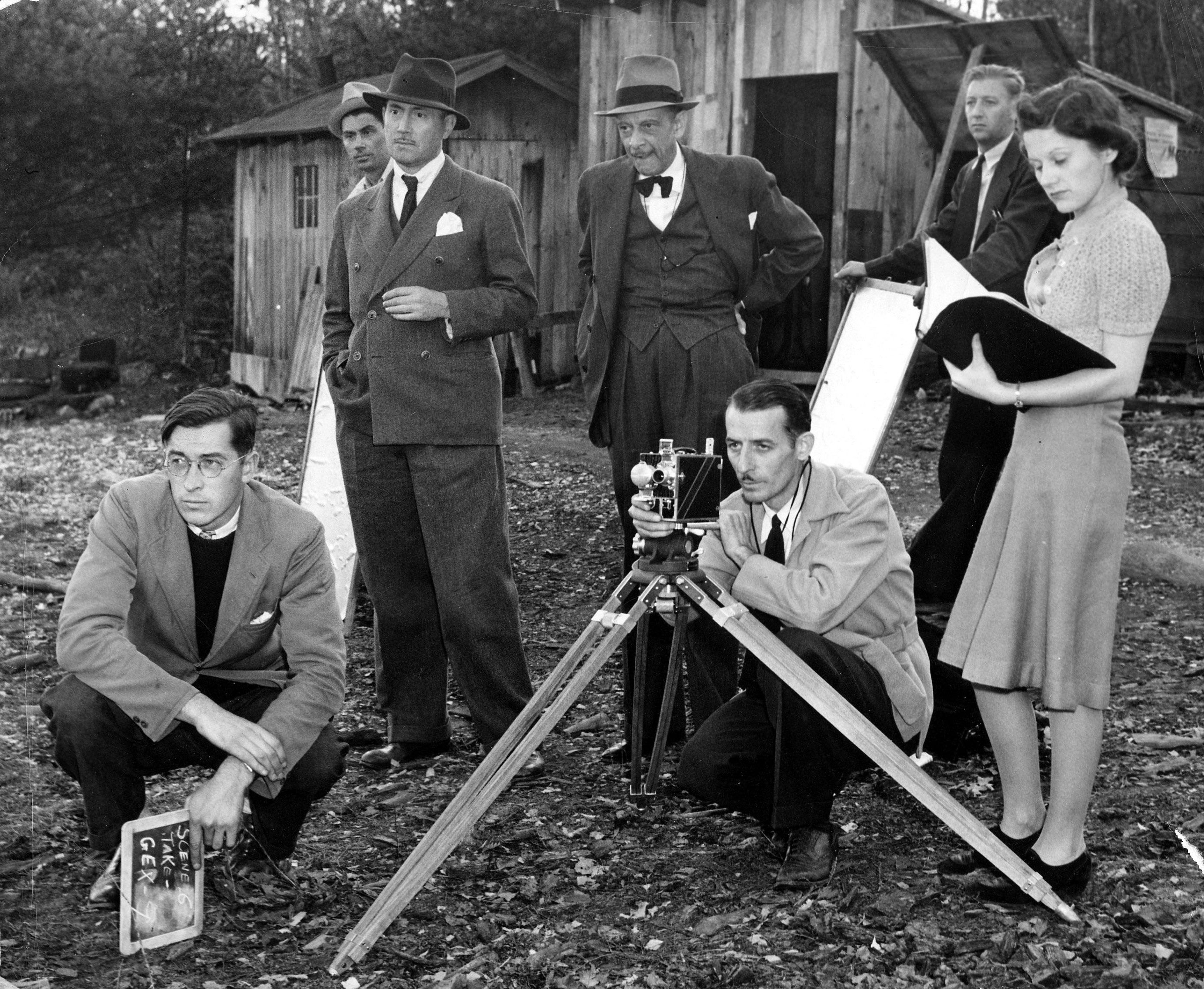
Betty and Ray Culley (behind the camera) on a motion picture shoot in the 1940s.

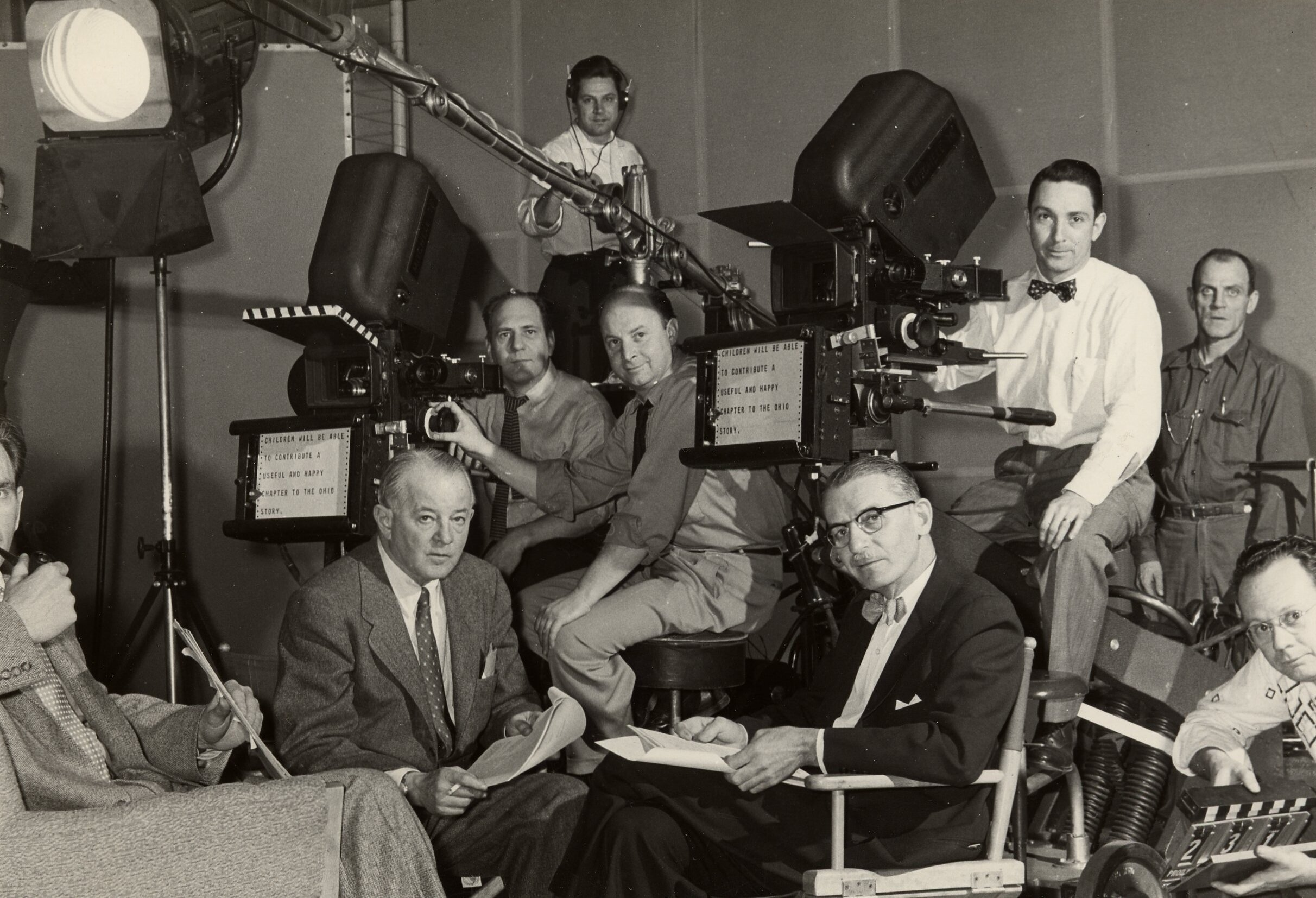
Ray Culley (center in director's chair) using multiple cameras with teleprompters to film the same scene from different angles simultaneously.

Ray Culley directed the first half-hour TV infomercial. The infomercial featured William Grover “Papa” Barnard selling Vitamix blenders on a show called “Home Miracles of the 1950s.”

Ray Culley also directed early TV sewing, cooking, and craft films featuring Louise Winslow, the "Martha Stewart of early daytime television."

== Early Careers ==
Born in Norwalk, Ohio in 1904, Ray Culley started as an actor in B-movies produced by Tiffany Pictures, a Poverty Row studio, but was soon behind the camera working as a production manager and assistant to M.H. Hoffman, Sr., the studio's president. in 1931, he went with Hoffman as production manager when he organized Allied Pictures and continued as production manager and took on the job of supervising foreign versions when Hoffman started Liberty Pictures. In 1935, he joined Republic Pictures Corporation as production manager and assistant director when the new studio bought the assets of Allied and Liberty Pictures.

Culley's transition to industrial filmmaking came in 1937 when he directed a series of films for General Electric (GE) Lighting Division in Cleveland, produced by Tri-State Productions.

Born in Bavaria, Germany in 1914, Elizabeth (Betty) Buehner Culley took her first studio job as a film cutter (editor) at Tri-State Motion Pictures in 1937 where she met Ray. In 1939, Betty took a film editing job in New York, where she gained experience with a new film format—16 mm safety film. She convinced Ray that the new film size, which at the time was primarily used by amateurs and news film crews, would revolutionize the sponsored film industry.

In 1939, Betty and Ray started Cinécraft Productions in rental space in the Card Building at 118 St Clair Ave. in Cleveland. The studio moved in 1947 to the Chamber of Industries Building at 2515 Franklin Blvd. in Cleveland. In 2025, Cinécraft was still operating out of the John Eisenmann-designed building that started as the home of the first Western Branch of the Cleveland Public Library in 1898.

== Selected filmography ==
Year	Film	Studio	Position	Notes
1933	One Year Later	Allied Pictures	Production manager	Included on film credits
1933	The Fighting Parson	Allied Pictures	Production manager	Included on film credits
1934	Cheaters	Liberty Pictures	Production manager	Included on film credits
1934	Picture Brides	Allied Pictures	Production manager	Included on film credits
1934	Take the Stand	Liberty Pictures	Production manager	Included on film credits
1937	Bill Howard R.F.D.	Tri-State Pictures	Production manager	Included on film credits. Sponsored by General Electric
1937	From Now On	Tri-State Pictures using available stages at Republic Pictures	Production manager	Sponsored by General Electric Co.
1938	The Romance of Iron and Steel	Tri-State Pictures/Cinécraft Business Film	Director	Included on film credits. Sponsored by ARMCO.
1938	The World's Largest Electrical Workshop	Tri-State Pictures	Director	Included on film credits Sponsored by General Electric Co.
1939	How to Win a Sales Argument	Tri-State Pictures	Director	
1939	You Bet Your Life	Cinécraft Productions	Director	Included on film credits. Sponsored by the Cleveland Safety Council and the Cleveland Railway Co.
1941	Better Roads Ahead	Cinécraft Productions	Director	Sponsored by the Hercules Powder Co.
1941	It Happened in the Kitchen	Cinécraft Productions	Director	Included on film credits. Sponsored by the Modern Kitchen Bureau. Preserved with an NFPC grant
1942	A Better Way	Cinécraft Productions	Director	Included on film credits. Sponsored by the DuPont Co. (Delsterol)
1943	Hercules Land	Cinécraft Productions	Director	Sponsored by the Hercules Powder Co.
1944	Careers for Cellulose	Cinécraft Productions	Director	Sponsored by the Hercules Powder Co.
1944	The Story of Phenothiazine	Cinécraft Productions	Director	Included on film credits. Sponsored by DuPont Co.
1945	It All Adds Up	Cinécraft Productions	Director	Included on film credits. Sponsored by the Westinghouse Electric Company
1946	Crystal Clear	Cinécraft Productions	Director	Included on film credits. Sponsored by Fostoria Glass Co.
1947	Lost Harvest	Cinécraft Productions	Director	Included on film credits. Sponsored by the DuPont Co.
1947	Naturally, It's FM	Cinécraft Productions	Director	Included on film credits. Sponsored by the General Electric Co.
1947	The Wayward BTU	Cinécraft Productions	Director	Included on film credits. Sponsored by the Owens-Corning Fiberglass Co.
1948	Miracle on Mulberry Street	Cinécraft Productions	Director	Included on film credits. Sponsored by Seiberling Tire and Rubber Co.
1948	Moulders of Progress	Cinécraft Productions	Director	Included on film credits. Sponsored by the Eljer Plumbing Co.
1948	Television Televised, filmed TV series	Cinécraft Productions	Director	Sponsored by the Austin Company
1948	The Talking Hoist	Cinécraft Productions	Director	Included on film credits. Sponsored by the National Potato Chip Institute
1949	Through the Kitchen Window, filmed TV series (Louise Winslow)	Cinécraft Productions	Producer	Sponsored by the East Ohio Gas Company
1950	Adventures in Sewing, filmed TV series (Louise Winslow)	Cinécraft Productions	Producer	Included on film credits. Sponsored by Domestic Sewing Machine Co.
1950	Food Is Fun (Louise Winslow), filmed TV series	Cinécraft Productions	Producer	Sponsored by the East Ohio Gas Co.
1950	Home Miracles of the 1950s	Cinécraft Productions	Director	Included on film credits. Sponsored by the Natural Foods Institute (Vita-Mix)
1950	Let's Explore Ohio. Exploring the highways of Ohio TV series	Cinécraft Productions	Director	Sponsored by Standard Oil of Ohio
1952	Fan Family Album	Cinécraft Productions	Director	Included on film credits. Sponsored by the Westinghouse Electric Company
1952	Sadie Ferguson - Postmistress. Pilot for a TV film series.	Cinécraft Productions	Producer	Included on film credits
1952	The Jury Finds	Cinécraft Productions	Director	Included on film credits. Sponsored by Westinghouse Electric Co.
1953	The Ohio Story, filmed TV series 175 episodes	Cinécraft Productions	Director	Included on film credits. Sponsored by Ohio Bell Telephone
1953	Young Mother Hubbard	Cinécraft Productions	Director	Sponsored by Republic Steel Co.
1954	Fan Family Album	Cinécraft Productions	Director	Included on film credits. Sponsored by Westinghouse Electric Co.
1954	Magnificat	Cinécraft Productions	Director	Included on film credits. Sponsored by the Blue Nuns (Holy Humility of Mary religious order)
1954	Milestones of Motoring	Cinécraft Productions	Director	Included on film credits. Sponsored by Standard Oil of Ohio
1959	Ohio: The Growth State	Cinécraft Productions	Director	Included on film credits. Sponsored by the State of Ohio Bureau of Unemployment Compensation
1961	Letter to Youngstown	Cinécraft Productions	Director	Included on film credits. Sponsored by Youngstown Sheet and Tube Co.
1962	The Velvet Curtain	Cinécraft Productions	Director	Sponsored by The American Good Government Society
1963	The Key to the City with Chet Huntley	Cinécraft Productions	Director	Sponsored by Haines Publishers: Criss-cross Directory
1964	Bill & Sue Boynton Go Into Politics film series	Cinécraft Continental Productions	Director	Included on film credits. Sponsored by The National Association of Manufacturers
1966	The Extraordinary Big Hunt	Cinécraft Productions	Producer	Sponsored by The White Motor Co.
1966	Why Politics? with Richard Nixon	Cinécraft Productions	Director	Sponsored by The Republic Steel Co.
1967	Ohio Heritage. 11 episode Educational TV (ETV) series	Cinécraft Productions	Director	Included on film credits. Sponsored by Standard Oil of Ohio

== Personal life ==
Betty and Ray Culley are buried in Holy Cross Cemetery in Brook Park, Ohio. They had three boys: twins John and Jim (1944) and Ray (1946).

== Archival sources ==
Ray Culley's papers, notebooks, and photographs documenting his years working in Hollywood are held by the Margaret Herrick Library of the Academy of Motion Picture Arts and Sciences in Beverly Hills. The Hagley Museum and Library (Hagley.org) is the depository of early Cinécraft films, scripts, and records.
