= Basil Ruysdael =

American actor and opera singer (1878–1960)

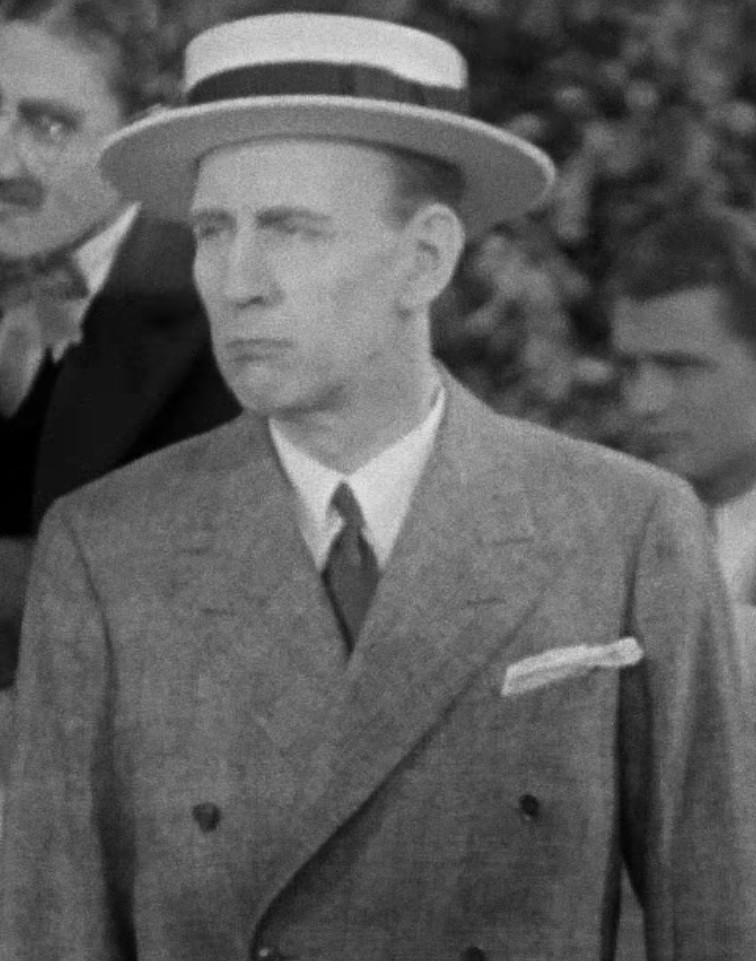
- Ruysdael in The Cocoanuts (1929)
- Born: Basil Spaulding Millspaugh; July 24, 1878; Jersey City, New Jersey, U.S.
- Died: October 10, 1960 (aged 82); Hollywood, California, U.S.
- Education: Cornell University
- Occupations: Actor, singer
- Years active: 1910–1960
- Spouses: Eleanor Manierre (m. 1915; div. 1923): Kathleen Dobbyn

Basil Spaulding Millspaugh (July 24, 1878 – October 10, 1960), known as Basil Ruysdael, was an American actor and opera singer.

== Early life ==
Born in Jersey City, New Jersey, as Basil Spaulding Millspaugh, Ruysdael was the son of Dr and Mrs Charles Millspaugh. He graduated from Waverly High School and attended Cornell University from 1898 to 1899 as a special student in mechanical engineering and sang with the Cornell University Glee Club. He sang secondary roles in the German repertoire at the Metropolitan Opera in New York as a bass-baritone from 1910 to 1918, appearing with such popular opera stars as Leo Slezak and Geraldine Farrar.

== Stage career ==
Early in his career, Ruysdael appeared on the New York stage. His Broadway credits include Enchanted Isle (1927), The Cocoanuts (1925), Topsy and Eva (1924), and Robin Hood (1912).

== Film career ==
He was the narrator for The Romance of Iron and Steel, a 1938 sponsored film produced by Cinécraft Productions for the American Rolling Mill Company (ARMCO).

Ruysdael was also a prolific character actor in films. He is probably best known to modern audiences as Detective Hennessy in the first Marx Brothers film The Cocoanuts (1929), a role he created in the 1925 stage play. He also appeared in Pinky, The File on Thelma Jordon, Colorado Territory, Broken Arrow, People Will Talk, Carrie, The Violent Men, Blackboard Jungle, The Last Hurrah and The Horse Soldiers.

In 1955, Ruysdael played General Andrew Jackson in the Disney miniseries Davy Crockett. Ruysdael was cast as Joseph in "The Policeman's Gun", a 1958 episode of Official Detective. In his final television role he appeared on Perry Mason as Henry W. Dameron in the 1959 episode, "The Case of Paul Drake's Dilemma". His last on-screen role was in The Story of Ruth in 1960.

== Radio career ==
Ruysdael narrated the NBC Blue Network series Stones of History which was broadcast in 1934 and 1935. He was the announcer on a syndicated programme for Rexall in 1939 before becoming the commercial spokesman for DuPont on Cavalcade of America on the NBC Blue Network in 1940. By 1941, he was a pitch-man for Lucky Strike cigarettes, which sponsored several shows including Your Hit Parade, Information Please and The Jack Benny Show. He appeared, transcribed, on the latter show from October 1, 1944, to November 28, 1948, and gave his name near the end of the final commercial. Ruysdael was also the announcer on a 1944 summer replacement show, Mother and Dad, starring Parker Fennelly on CBS, and Radio Reader's Digest in 1946 on CBS.

== Voice teacher ==
Ruysdael moved to California in 1923 to teach voice. His most famous pupil was baritone Lawrence Tibbett.

== Death ==
Ruysdael died on October 10, 1960, at the age of 82, of complications following surgery in a hospital in Hollywood, California. He was survived by his widow, Kathleen, who was his third wife. He was buried in Forest Lawn Memorial Park, Omaha, Nebraska.

== Partial filmography ==
- The Cocoanuts (1929) as Detective Hennessy
- The Romance of Iron and Steel (film) (1938). Narrator. Listed in film credits
- Colorado Territory (1949) as Dave Rickard
- Come to the Stable (1949) as The Bishop
- Task Force (1949) as Admiral at Annapolis (uncredited)
- Pinky (1949) as Judge Walker
- The Doctor and the Girl (1949) as Dr. Francis I. Garard
- The File on Thelma Jordon (1950) as Judge Jonathan David Hancock
- One Way Street (1950) as Father Moreno
- Broken Arrow (1950) as Gen. Oliver Howard
- High Lonesome (1950) as 'Horse' Davis, Ranch Owner
- Gambling House (1951) as Judge Ravinek
- The Scarf (1951) as Cyrus Barrington
- Raton Pass (1951) as Pierre Challon
- My Forbidden Past (1951) as Dean Cazzley
- Half Angel (1951) as Dr. Jackson
- People Will Talk (1951) as Dean Lyman Brockwell
- Boots Malone (1952) as Preacher Cole
- Carrie (1952) as Mr. Fitzgerald
- Prince Valiant (1954) as Old Viking (uncredited)
- The Shanghai Story (1954) as Rev. Hollingsworth
- Davy Crockett, King of the Wild Frontier (1955) as Gen. / President Andrew Jackson (archive footage)
- The Violent Men (1955) as Tex Hinkleman
- Blackboard Jungle (1955) as Professor A. R. Kraal
- Pearl of the South Pacific (1955) as Tuan Michael
- Diane (1956) as Chamberlain
- Jubal (1956) as Shem Hoktor
- These Wilder Years (1956) as Judge
- Official Detective "The Policeman's Gun" (1958) as Joseph
- The Last Hurrah (1958) as Bishop Gardner
- The Horse Soldiers (1959) as Headmaster, Military School
- Perry Mason (1959 S3 E6) as Henry W. Dameron
- The Story of Ruth (1960) as Shammah (final film role)
