= Multiple-camera setup =

Method of film making and video production

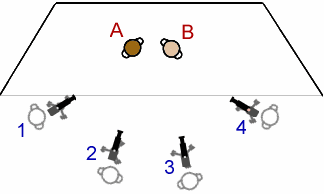
Diagram showing a multicam setup

The multiple-camera setup, multiple-camera mode of production, multi-camera or simply multicam is a method of filmmaking, television production and video production. Several cameras—either film or professional video cameras—are employed on the set and simultaneously record or broadcast a scene. It is often contrasted with a single-camera setup, which uses one camera.

== Description ==
Generally, the two outer cameras shoot close-up shots or "crosses" of the two most active characters on the set at any given time, while the central camera or cameras shoot a wider master shot to capture the overall action and establish the geography of the room. In this way, multiple shots are obtained in a single take without having to start and stop the action. This is more efficient for programs that are to be shown a short time after being shot, as it reduces the time spent in film or video editing. It is also a virtual necessity for regular, high-output shows like daily soap operas. Apart from saving editing time, scenes may be shot far more quickly as there is no need for re-lighting and the set-up of alternative camera angles for the scene to be shot again from a different angle. It also reduces the complexity of tracking continuity issues that crop up when the scene is reshot from different angles.

Drawbacks include a less optimized lighting setup that needs to provide a compromise for all camera angles and less flexibility in putting the necessary equipment on scene, such as microphone booms and lighting rigs. These can be efficiently hidden from just one camera, but can be more complicated to set up, and their placement may be inferior in a multiple-camera setup. Another drawback is in the usage of recording capacity, as a four-camera setup may use (depending on the cameras involved) up to four times as much film (or digital storage space) per take compared with a single-camera setup.

A multiple-camera setup will require all cameras to be synchronous to assist with editing and to avoid cameras running at different scan rates, with the primary methods being SMPTE timecode and Genlock.

== Film ==
Most films use a single-camera setup, but in recent decades larger films have begun to use more than one camera on set, usually with two cameras simultaneously filming the same setup.

== Television ==
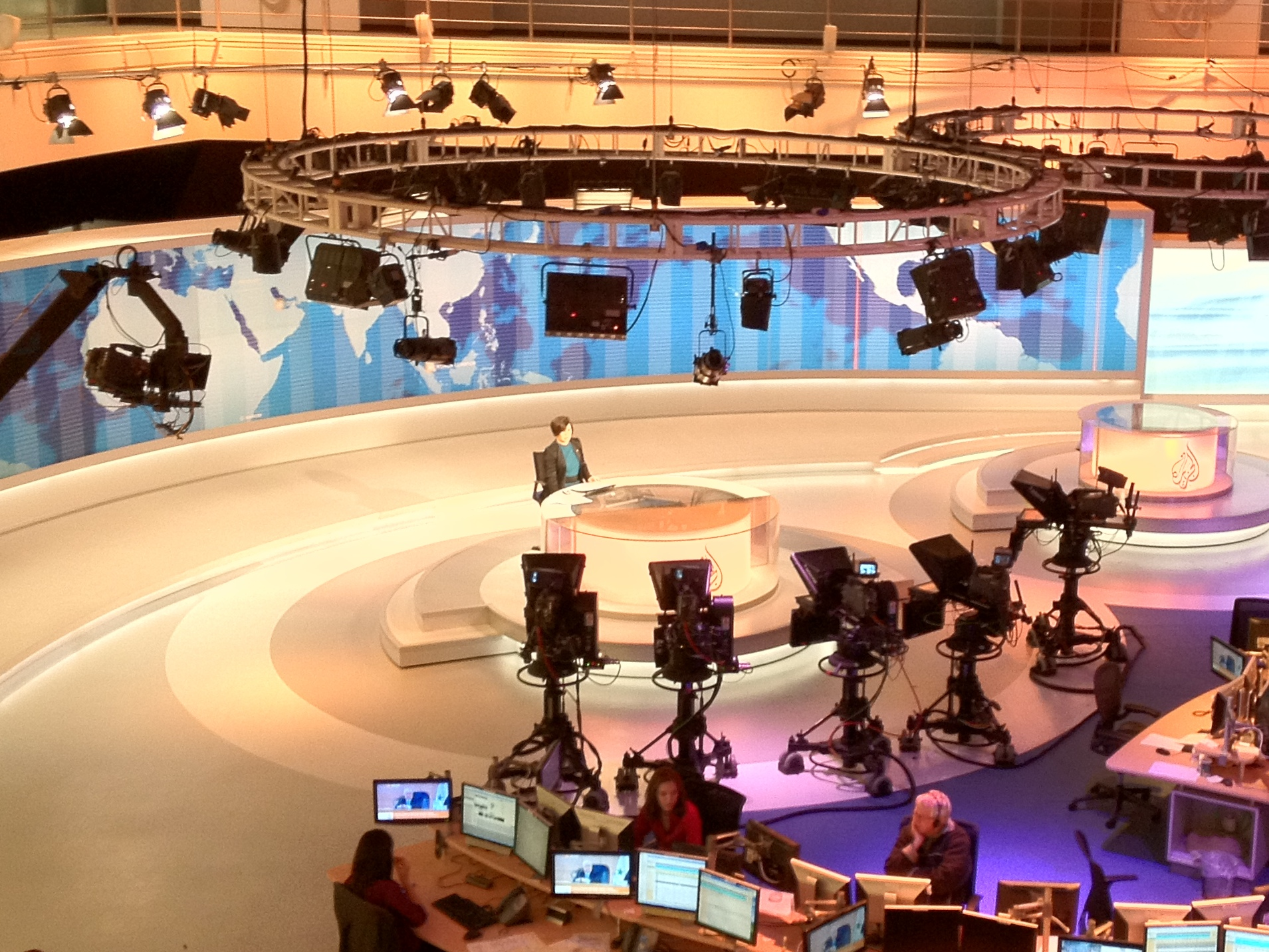
Live news, such as Al Jazeera, uses multiple cameras for their broadcasts.

Multiple-camera setups are common in live television. The multiple-camera method gives the director less control over each shot but is faster and less expensive than a single-camera setup. In television, multiple-camera is commonly used for light entertainment, sports events, news, soap operas, talk shows, game shows, variety shows, and some sitcoms, especially ones filmed before a live studio audience.

Multiple cameras can take different shots of a live situation as the action unfolds chronologically, and are suitable for shows which require a live audience. For this reason, multiple camera productions can be filmed or taped much faster than single camera. Single-camera productions are shot in takes and various setups with components of the action repeated several times and out of sequence; the action is not enacted chronologically, so it is unsuitable for viewing by a live audience.

In multiple-camera television, the director creates a line cut by instructing the technical director (vision mixer in UK terminology) to switch between the feeds from the individual cameras. This is either transmitted live or recorded. In the case of sitcoms with studio audiences, this line cut is typically displayed to them on studio monitors. The line cut might be refined later in editing, as often the output from all cameras is recorded, both separately and as a combined reference display called the q split (a technique known as "ISO" recording). The camera currently being recorded to the line cut is indicated by a tally light controlled by a camera control unit (CCU) on the camera as a reference both for the talent and the camera operators, and an additional tally light may be used to indicate to the camera operator that they are being ISO recorded.

A sitcom shot with a multiple-camera setup will require a different form of script from a single-camera setup.

== History and use ==
The use of multiple film cameras dates back to the development of narrative silent films, with the earliest (or at least earliest known) example being the first Russian feature film Defence of Sevastopol (1911), written and directed by Vasily Goncharov and Aleksandr Khanzhonkov. When sound came into the picture multiple cameras were used to film multiple sets at a single time. Early sound was recorded onto wax discs that could not be edited.

The use of multiple video cameras to cover a scene goes back to the earliest days of television; three cameras were used to broadcast The Queen's Messenger in 1928, the first drama performed for television. The first drama performed for British television was Pirandello's play The Man With the Flower in His Mouth in 1930, using a single camera. The BBC routinely used multiple cameras for their live television shows from 1936 onward.

=== United States ===
Before the pre-recorded continuing series became the dominant dramatic form on American television, the earliest anthology programs (see the Golden Age of Television) utilized multiple camera methods.

Although some claim the multiple-camera setup was pioneered for television when producer and co-star Desi Arnaz, associate producer Al Simon, and cinematographer Karl Freund of Desilu Productions used it to film I Love Lucy in 1951, other producers had been using the technique for several years.

According to Thomas Schatz, Jerry Fairbanks is the first to develop a 16mm multi-camera system to film a made-for-TV show when he used it to shoot the pilot episode of Public Prosecutor in 1947. Fairbanks went on to film 26 episodes for a planned network premiere in September 1948, but it was pulled from the schedule, and the show did not air until 1951.

Assisted by producer-director Frank Telford, Fairbanks also used a multi-camera system to film Edgar Bergen's Silver Theater which aired in the 1949-50 season. He continued working with this system for the pilot of Truth or Consequences in April 1950. When Al Simon joined Ralph Edwards Productions in producing Truth or Consequences several months later, he improved the system by substituting 35mm film for 16mm film and adding a more sophisticated intercom system.

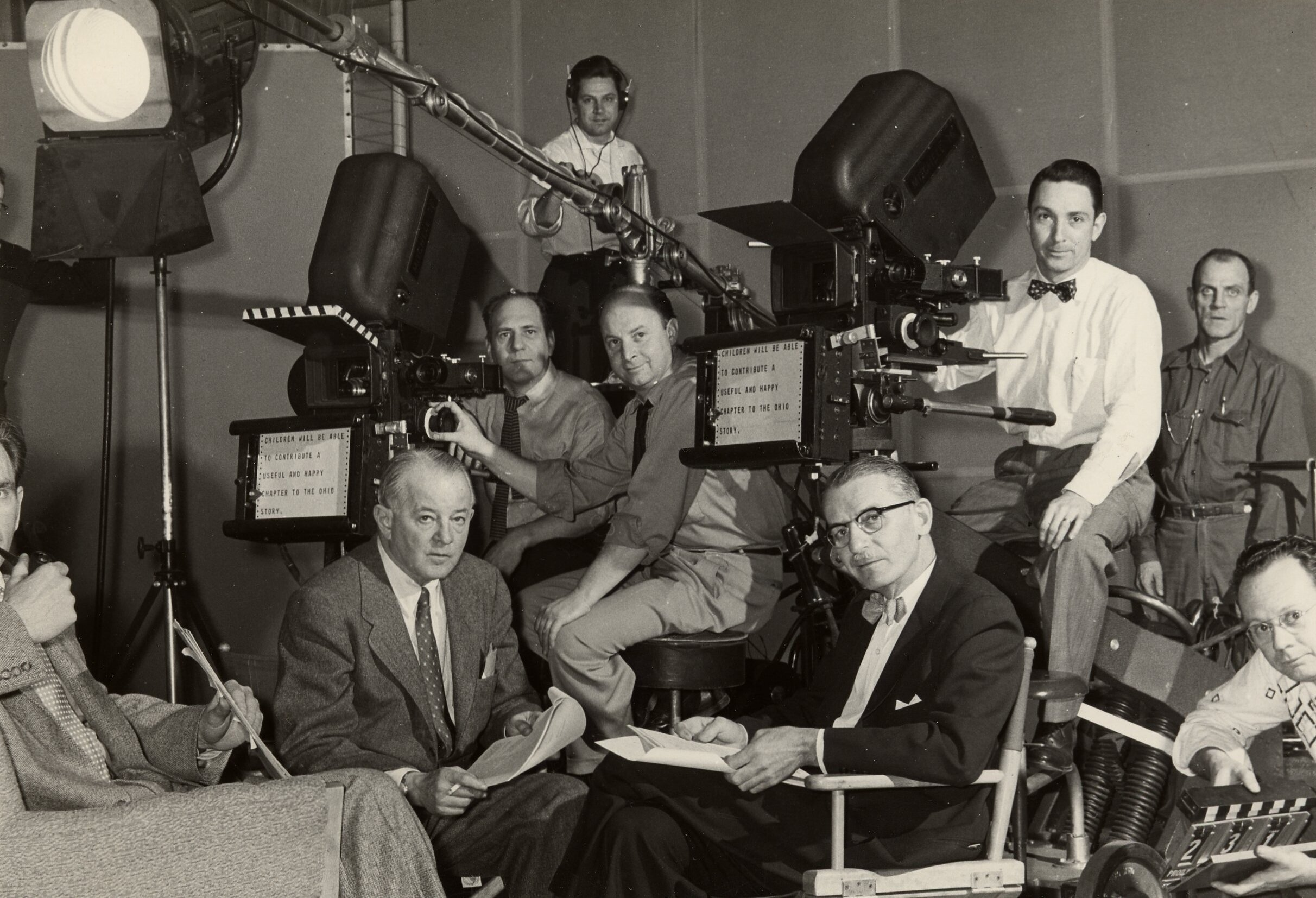
Ray Culley of Cinécraft Productions used two or more cameras with teleprompters and rear screen projectors extensively in filming early television programs.

In 1949, Ray Culley of Cinécraft Productions, a sponsored film studio, filmed the first TV infomercial, Home Miracles for the 1950s, for Vitamix using the technique. Culley also used the technique for three made-for-television TV series featuring Louise Winslow, a pioneer in sewing, cooking, and craft "how-to" programs on daytime television - Adventures in Sewing (1950), Food Is Fun (1950), and Kitchen Chats (1950). A 1950 article in Printers' Ink, "Three-Camera Technique used to shoot TV film", discussed Cinécraft's innovative production style. In 1966, the studio made a film, "Cinécraft, Inc. Multi-camera Filming Technique Demonstration", showing how the technique works and describing rear screen projection and teleprompters, other innovative technologies of the era

In the late 1970s, Garry Marshall was credited with adding the fourth camera (known then as the "X" Camera, and occasionally today known as the "D" Camera) to the multi-camera set-up for his series Mork & Mindy. Actor Robin Williams could not stay on his marks due to his physically active improvisations during shooting, so Marshall had them add the fourth camera just to stay on Williams so they would have more than just the master shot of the actor. Soon after, many productions followed suit, making four cameras (A, B, C and X/D) the norm for multi-camera situation comedies.

Sitcoms shot with the multiple camera setup include nearly all of Lucille Ball's TV series, as well as Mary Kay and Johnny, Our Miss Brooks, The Dick Van Dyke Show, The Mary Tyler Moore Show, All in the Family, Three's Company, Cheers, The Cosby Show, Full House, Seinfeld, Family Matters, The Fresh Prince of Bel-Air, Mad About You, Friends, The Drew Carey Show, Frasier, Will & Grace, Everybody Loves Raymond, The King of Queens, Two and a Half Men, How I Met Your Mother, The Big Bang Theory, Mike & Molly, Last Man Standing, Mom, 2 Broke Girls, The Odd Couple, One Day at a Time, Man with a Plan, Carol's Second Act, Bob Hearts Abishola, as well as Disney and Nickelodeon sitcoms like That's So Raven, Drake & Josh, The Suite Life of Zack & Cody, Hannah Montana, Wizards of Waverly Place, Good Luck Charlie, Jessie, Austin & Ally, Dog with a Blog, Lab Rats, Kickin' It, iCarly, Victorious, The Thundermans, and Henry Danger. Many American sitcoms from the 1950s to the 1970s were shot using the single camera method, including The Adventures of Ozzie and Harriet, Leave It to Beaver, The Andy Griffith Show, The Addams Family, The Munsters, Get Smart, Bewitched, I Dream of Jeannie, Gilligan's Island, Hogan's Heroes, and The Brady Bunch. The earliest seasons of Happy Days were filmed using a single-camera setup before the series transitioned to a multi-camera setup (which also occurred alongside its increase in popularity). These did not have a live studio audience, and by being shot single-camera, tightly edited sequences could be created, along with multiple locations and visual effects such as magical appearances and disappearances. Multiple-camera sitcoms were more simplified but have been compared to theatre work due to their similar setup and use of theatre-experienced actors and crew members.

While the multiple-camera format dominated American sitcom production from the 1970s to the 1990s, there has been a revival of the single-camera format with programs such as Malcolm in the Middle (2000–2006), Curb Your Enthusiasm (2000–2024), Scrubs (2001–2010), Arrested Development (2003–2006, 2013–2019), The Office (2005–2013), My Name Is Earl (2005–2009), Everybody Hates Chris (2005–2009), It's Always Sunny in Philadelphia (2005–present), 30 Rock (2006–2013), Modern Family (2009–2020), The Middle (2009–2018), Community (2009–2015), Parks and Recreation (2009–2015), Raising Hope (2010–2014), Louie (2010–2015), New Girl (2011–2018), Veep (2012–2019), Brooklyn Nine-Nine (2013–2021), The Goldbergs (2013–2023), Broad City (2014–2019), Black-ish (2014–2022), Silicon Valley (2014–2019), Schitt's Creek (2015–2020), Unbreakable Kimmy Schmidt (2015–2019), Superstore (2015–2021), The Good Place (2016–2020), American Housewife (2016–2021), Young Sheldon (2017–2024), Ted Lasso (2020–present), Hacks (2021–2026), Abbott Elementary (2021–present), and Adults (2025–present).

=== United Kingdom ===
The majority of British sitcoms and dramas from the 1950s to the early 1990s were made using a multi-camera format. Unlike the United States, the development of completed filmed programming, using the single camera method, was limited for several decades. Instead, a "hybrid" form emerged using (single camera) filmed inserts, generally location work, which was mixed with interior scenes shot in the multi-camera electronic studio. It was the most common type of domestic production screened by the BBC and ITV. However, as technology developed, some drama productions were mounted on location using multiple electronic cameras. Many all-action 1970s programs, such as The Sweeney and The Professionals were shot using the single camera method on 16mm film. Meanwhile, by the early 1980s, the most highly budgeted and prestigious television productions, like Brideshead Revisited (1981), had begun to use film exclusively.

By the late 1990s, soap operas were left as the only TV drama made in the UK using multiple cameras. Television prime-time dramas are usually shot using a single-camera setup.

== See also ==
- 3D reconstruction from multiple images
- Camera rig
- Circle-Vision 360°
- Light stage is a device used for capturing the shape, texture, and reflectance of a target, usually for virtual cinematography. Light stages are usually a combination of multiple cameras and structured light techniques, and additionally, polarizers are included to find the subsurface scattering component of the target's skin.
- Omnidirectional camera
- Single-camera setup
