= Cinécraft Productions =

American corporate film production studio

- Founders: Ray Culley; Betty Culley
- Website: cinecraft.com

Cinécraft Productions, Inc. is a privately held American sponsored film and video production studio in Cleveland, Ohio. The studio is said to be the longest-standing sponsored film and video production house in the U.S.

Cinécraft was one of hundreds of sponsored film studios in the United States during the mid-20th century. In Cleveland alone, there were at least 13 sponsored film studios in the 1940s, 50s, and 60s.

Cinécraft pioneered the use of teleprompters and multi-camera filmmaking for industry and early TV productions.

== History and innovations ==
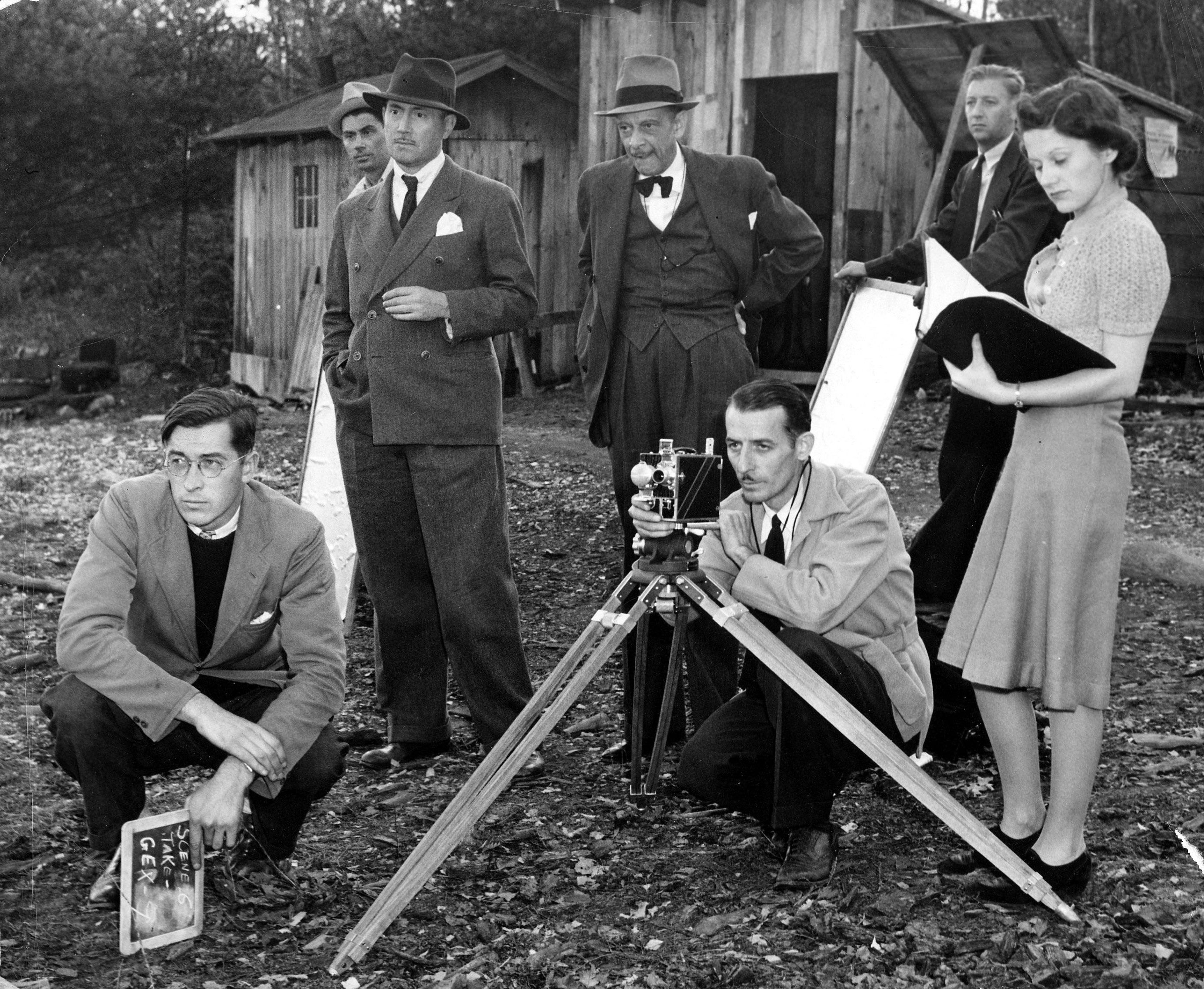
Betty and Ray Culley (behind the camera), founders of Cinécraft Productions, on a motion picture shoot in the 1940s. Photo courtesy of the Hagley Museum & Library.

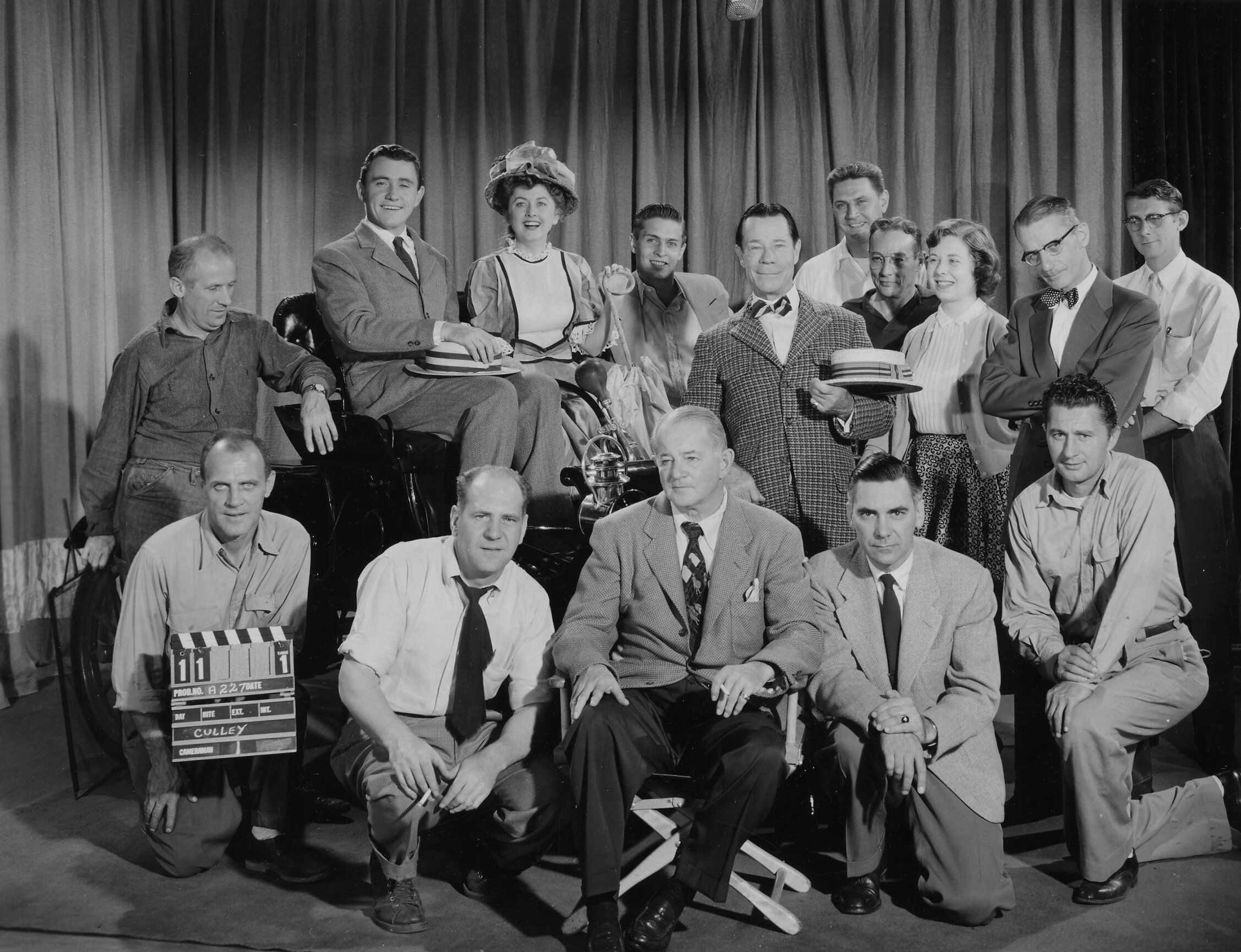
Cast and Cinécraft Productions film crew on the set of Milestones of Motoring (1954). Photo courtesy of the Hagley Museum & Library.

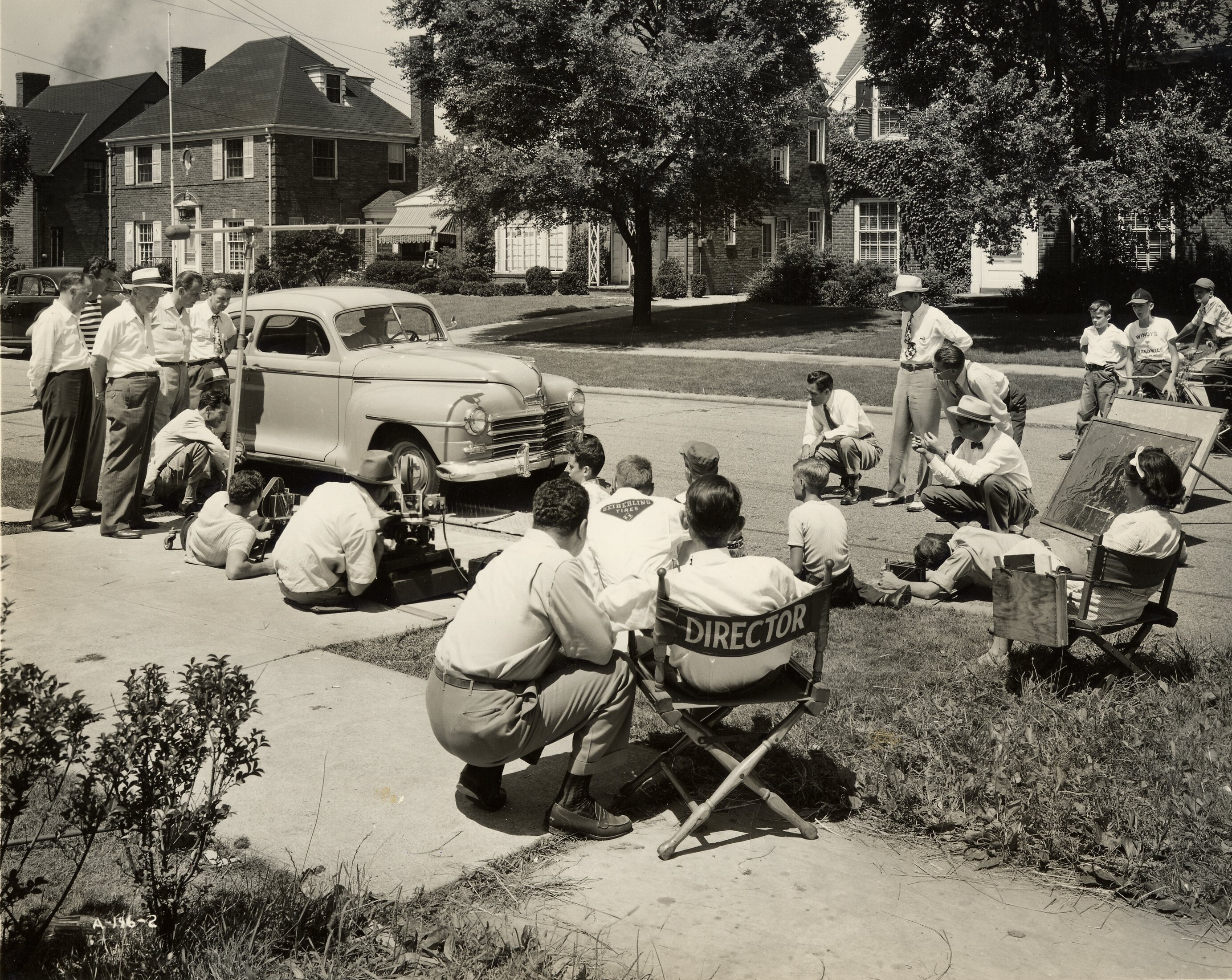
The cast and crew of Cinécraft Productions filming Miracle on Mulberry Street (1948). Photo courtesy of the Hagley Museum & Library.

Cinécraft was founded by Ray Culley (1904-1983) and Betty Buehner Culley (1914-2016) in 1939.

The Culleys began their movie careers in the 1930s, working on feature films: Ray as an actor and director in Hollywood and Betty as a cutter (film editor) in Cleveland, Ohio, and New York City. They met at Tri-State Pictures when Ray was hired to direct a series of films including From Now On (1937 movie) (1937), Bill Howard R.F.D. (1937)., The Romance of Iron and Steel (1938) and The World's Largest Electrical Workshop (1938).

Promoting "Sound Business Pictures in Natural Color," Cinécraft began in a rental space in the Card Building on St. Clair Ave. in downtown Cleveland. In 1947, the studio moved to 2515 Franklin Blvd. in Ohio City, Cleveland.

Cinécraft was a pioneer in early U.S. television advertising and programming. In 1948, the studio produced the first filmed half-hour-long infomercial. It featured William Grover "Papa" Barnard selling Vitamix blenders.

The studio produced many early TV programs featuring Louise Winslow, a pioneer in television programming focused on sewing, cooking, and crafts.

The studio produced Television Televised, a five-part series explaining how live television was produced and broadcast in 1948 for the Austin Company.

The studio produced The Ohio Story, a made-for-TV film series that aired from 1953 to 1961. The film series was based on the Frank Siedel-created radio series of the same name, which aired from 1947 to 1953. The radio series ended in 1955 after over 1,300 radio episodes had been produced. Premiering on October 4, 1953, The Ohio Story TV series lasted nine years, with 175 TV episodes being produced.

The Cleveland Play House was a source for many actors used in Cinécraft films, and the Cleveland Orchestra provided elaborate music scores for the studio. Occasionally, they recruited Hollywood actors to appear in their movies at their client's request. Hollywood actors and celebrities that appeared in Cinécraft productions include Alan Alda, Don Ameche, Ernie Anderson, Joe E. Brown, Milton Caniff, Dorothy Carnegie, Tim Conway, Wally Cox, John Dehner, Brian Donlevy, Bob Feller, Ben Grauer, Joel Grey, Reed Hadley, Alois Havrilla, Chet Huntley, Danny Kaye, Otto Kruger, Jock Mahoney, Nelson Olmsted, Richard Nixon, Basil Rathbone, Lowell Thomas, Ray Walston, James Whitmore, and Louise Winslow.

== Clients ==
Cinécraft's major film clients included ALCOA, B. F. Goodrich, Bell Telephone, DuPont, General Electric, Hercules Inc., Libbey-Owens-Ford, Owens-Corning, Ohio Bell, Seiberling Rubber Company, Standard Oil of Ohio, Westinghouse Electric Corporation, and Youngstown Sheet & Tube.

Most of the studio's film business came through advertising agencies, including Fuller & Smith & Ross, Inc. and McCann-Erickson.

== Core transitions ==
In 1970, Paul Culley, Ray Culley's brother, bought the company. Paul was a World War II hero. During his first mission as a crew chief in a B-17 flying from a base in Italy, anti-aircraft fire disabled his plane, forcing the entire crew to bail out. He spent six weeks evading German soldiers while being aided by the Yugoslav underground. After returning to Italy, Paul continued to fly bombing missions. On his seventh mission, his plane was hit by anti-aircraft fire, forcing the crew to bail out again. He endured four months in a German prisoner of war camp before being liberated by American forces.

Paul Culley guided Cinécraft through the 1970s, a time when most sponsored film studios succumbed to the pressures of a struggling American economy and the transition from film to video.

For the first 46 years, a member of the Culley family ran the studio, and many Culley family members worked there.

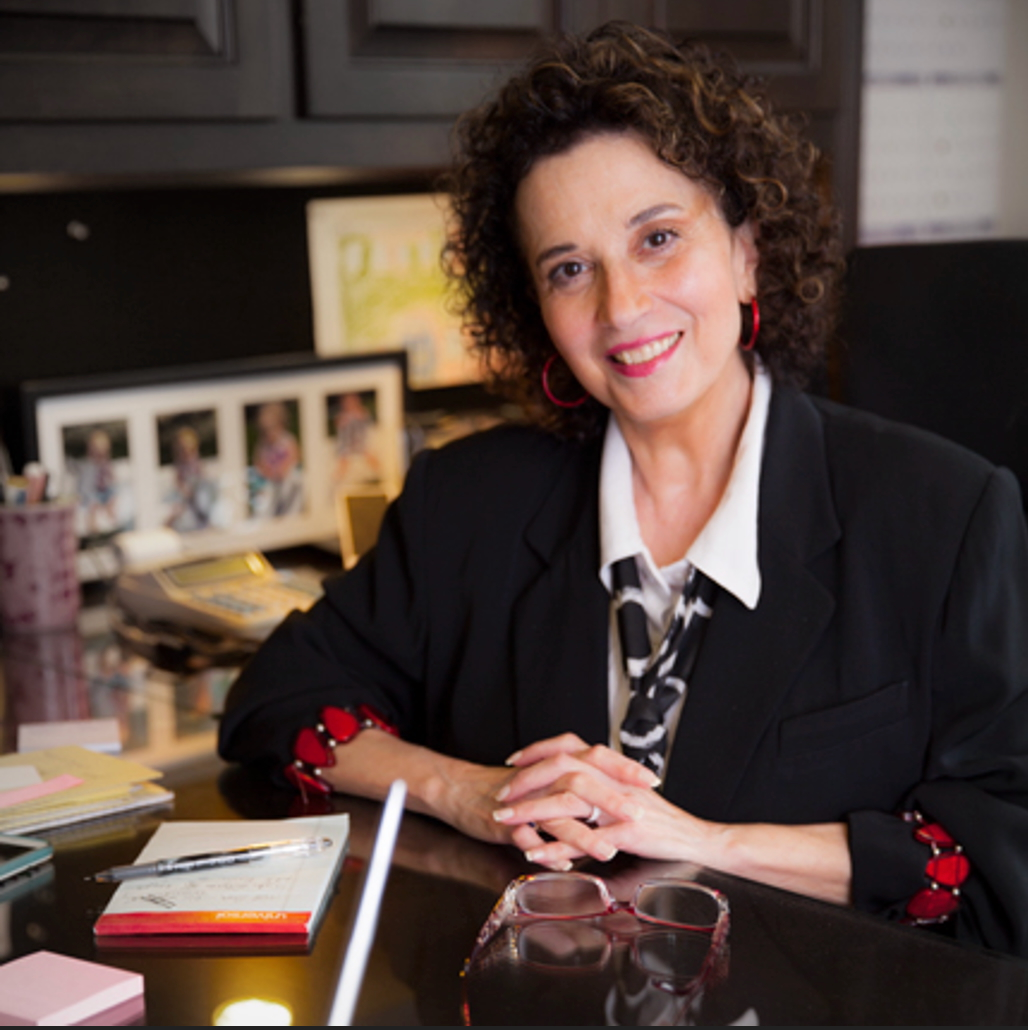
Maria Keckan, past president and co-owner of Cinécraft Productions, the longest-standing sponsored film and video production house in the U.S. Photo courtesy of Cinécraft Productions.

In 1985, Maria Keckan, a writer, producer, and director of healthcare videos, and her husband, Neil McCormick, a producer and director at Cinécraft, purchased the studio. Maria took on the roles of President and CFO, while Neil was appointed Chairman of the Board. Together, they completed the change from film to broadcast-quality video as industrial and commercial clients demanded faster and easier ways to make effective motion pictures.

The last major studio film project was a Standard Oil of Ohio (SOHIO) film directed by Neil McCormick, From the River to the Sea (1982). The film featured a cast of Inuit people, all residents of Noorvik, Alaska, a tiny village located north of the Arctic Circle. The family members discuss the challenges of adapting to Western Culture while preserving their traditions. Shooting the film with portable 16mm film equipment was easier than using videotape equipment.

In the 1990s, the studio embraced digital technology with interactive computer-based medical training programs. This early period of digital technology improved over the years as Cinécraft Productions became known for e-learning and producing national and international projects for Fortune 1000 companies.

In 2018, Dan Keckan, Maria Keckan's son, was named Chief Executive Officer, and Matt Walsh was named Chief Operating Officer. Maria and Neil remained the sole shareholders of Cinécraft stock.

In 2025, the studio was still operating out of the John Eisenmann-designed building, which had been the home of the West Side Branch of the Cleveland Public Library since 1898.

== The Cinécraft Collection at Hagley Library ==
Maria Keckan and Neil McCormick donated the studio’s film archives to Hagley Library in 2019. Hagley initiated a ten-year project to process and catalog the films, scripts, and records.

Hagley Library’s Cinécraft film collection is one of the largest collections from an industrial film producer to survive an era when thousands of studios specialized in making sponsored films.

A portion of the collection consists of films made by other sponsored film studios, including those dating back to the silent film era. The collection comprises over 6,000 films and videos encompassing approximately 2,000 unique productions, 1,000 scripts and related records, oral histories with key studio personnel, and 3,000 production photographs and negatives from the studio. A significant portion of the collection features one-of-a-kind material not held by any other library or archive.

== Notable Cinécraft sponsored films ==
- The Romance of Iron and Steel (1938) – ARMCO. The sequences on how steel is made are beautifully choreographed, given the film equipment of the time. The Hagley Library received a 2022 grant from the National Film Preservation Foundation to preserve the film.
- It Happened in the Kitchen (1941) – General Electric. Focuses on the importance of having a "modern kitchen" and how modernizing can benefit the average American family. The Hagley Library received a 2024 grant from the National Film Preservation Foundation to preserve the film.
- Linter Logic (1945) – Hercules Powder Company. Importance of linters (a by-product from cottonseed oil production) in the burgeoning synthetics industry.
- Little Known Facts About a Well-Known Product: Ridgid (1945) – Ridge Tool Company. The film follows the process of manufacturing plumbing, pipe fitting, and other industrial tools.
- Crystal Clear (1946) – Fostoria Glass Co. Follows the process of making glass from shoveling batch into ovens, to gathering, blowing, annealing, and inspections. The film targets brides-to-be and was a popular choice for home economics classes.
- Naturally, It's FM (1947) – General Electric. The film helped launch the GE Musiphonic high-end record player, radio, shortwave, and AM and FM console all in one unit.
- Thank You, Mr. Chips (1947) – National Potato Chip Institute. The film covers the history of potato chips, an overview of the manufacturing process, and the nutritional benefits of consuming them.
- Moulders of Progress (1948) – Eljer Plumbing Company. Details the manufacturing process of porcelain sinks, bathtubs, and toilets, as well as brass water faucets.
- Let's Explore Ohio: Ohio Wildlife (1948) – Standard Oil of Ohio (SOHIO). An early film in the SOHIO Let's Explore Ohio series. Wildlife was filmed by naturalist Karl Maslowski.
- Freedom's Proving Grounds (1953) – Standard Oil of Ohio (SOHIO). W. Ward Marsh, the Cleveland Plain Dealer film critic for 50 years, says the film may very well be the best picture SOHIO has sponsored.
- A Fan Family Album (1954) – Westinghouse. An industrial musical made in an era before air conditioning, when fans were extremely important.
- Milestones of Motoring (1954) – Standard Oil of Ohio. An Industrial musical, the film traces the evolution of automotive innovations starting with Alexander Winton making the first automobile sale in 1898, the Stanley Motor Carriage Company and steam-powered cars, all the way to 1954 when the film was made. Stars Joe E. Brown and Merv Griffin. The Hagley Library received a 2024 grant from the National Film Preservation Foundation to preserve the film.
- The Long Ships Passing (1960) – Lake Carriers Association. Traces the history and unique features of the 700-foot-long and longer ships that carry bulk on the upper Great Lakes.
- The Velvet Curtain (1962) – The American Good Government Society. Hollywood actor Reed Hadley plays the role of managing editor of a small city daily newspaper investigating why many business and professional people fail to vote, especially in "off-year" elections.
- Invitation to Ohio (1964) – Ohio Bell Telephone. A peanut vendor gets mistaken for a high-powered CEO and is given a tour of Ohio. Stars Wally Cox and John Dehner. The Hagley Library received a 2025 grant from the National Film Preservation Foundation to preserve the film. The film promoted the state to industrial companies.
- Search (1964) - Youngstown Sheet and Tube. The film explores the research and development side of steel production. Zoltán Rozsnyai wrote the score played by members of the Cleveland Orchestra.
- Tools that Shaped America (1965) – Grinding Wheel Institute. Details important inventions and how they helped shape the United States. Stars Reed Hadley.
- Why Politics? (1966) – Republic Steel. The first in a series of Republic Steel middle management training films. Stars Richard Nixon.
- C-5 Galaxy: World's Largest Aircraft (1967) – U.S. Air Force. Tells the story of the building of the Lockheed Corporation C-5 Galaxy airplane - at the time, the world's largest aircraft.
- The Spoilers (1970) – Food Marketing Institute (Supermarket Institute). The film shows how unhealthy food preparation can make you sick. One of the most duplicated sponsored films up to that time.
- Projection '70 film series (1970) – Standard Oil of Ohio. Communications was one of a series of six films that projected changes in communications, education, agriculture, medicine, transportation, and urban systems in the U.S. The series was part of SOHIO's celebration commemorating the company's 100th anniversary.
- Where's Joe? (1972) – United Steelworkers of America and a consortium of leading U.S. steel corporations. The movie is credited with helping put the first "no-strike" clause into a labor contract in the history of the U.S. steel industry. The Hagley Library was awarded a grant from the National Film Preservation Foundation in 2023 to preserve the film.
- Free Wheelin' (1976) - B. F. Goodrich. A film about the custom van craze of the 1970s. The Hagley Library was awarded a grant from the National Film Preservation Foundation in 2023 to preserve the film.
- Where the River Enters the Sea (1982) – Standard Oil of Ohio. Shot on location in a remote Alaskan village. Believed to be the first film drama in which Eskimos act in every role.

== Notable early Cinécraft made-for-television films ==
- Television Televised (1948) – The Austin Company. Five episode series explains how the new technology of television works
- Through the Kitchen Window (1949) – Domestic Sewing Machine, Perfection Stove Company, Youngstown Kitchens, and East Ohio Gas. Starring Louise Winslow, the "Martha Stewart " of early television
- Food Is Fun (1950) – American Gas Association. Starring Louise Winslow
- Adventures in Sewing (1950) – Thirteen 30-minute filmed episodes were distributed to 29 TV stations across the country. Domestic Sewing Machine Co.
- Healthy Living Is Fun (1950) – Natural Foods Institute (VitaMix). One of the first infomercials
- Let's Explore Ohio TV Series (1950) - Standard Oil Company (Ohio). Thirteen filmed for TV "armchair" travel tours down the historic roads of Ohio
- The Ohio Story Filmed TV Series (1953–1960) – Ohio Bell Telephone. A series of 175 filmed Ohio Story TV episodes written by Frank Siedel, directed by Ray Culley, and starring Nelson Olmsted
