= The Romance of Iron and Steel =

1938 film

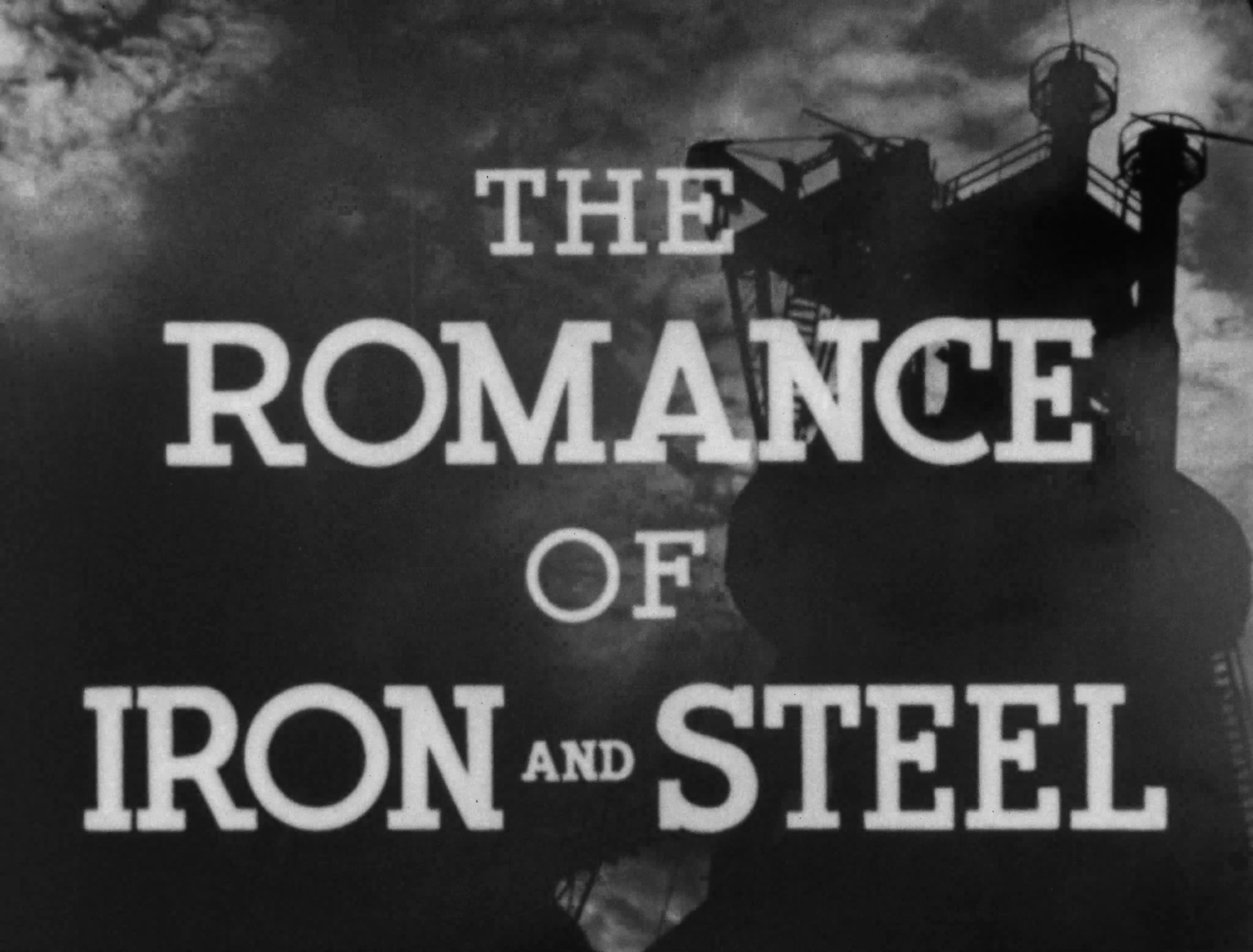
- Title frame
- Directed by: Ray Culley
- Starring: George M. Verity
- Narrated by: Basil Ruysdale
- Cinematography: Robert Sable
- Edited by: George McAvoy
- Music by: ARMCO Band
- Production company: Tri-State Motion Pictures
- Distributed by: Cinecraft Business Film
- Release date: 1938
- Running time: 21 minutes
- Country: United States
- Language: English

The Romance of Iron and Steel (1938) is a sponsored film by the American Rolling Mill Company (ARMCO). The film is the earliest surviving work by Cinécraft Productions, the longest-standing sponsored film and video production house in the U.S.

The black-and-white, sound, 21-minute documentary opens with an overview of the ARMCO Middletown, Ohio, Research Lab, opened in 1937. It then follows the sheet steel and stainless steel manufacturing processes from mining ore through the company's rolling mill plants. The film concludes with a message about “ARMCO men” and company culture, with an address by ARMCO founder George M. Verity.

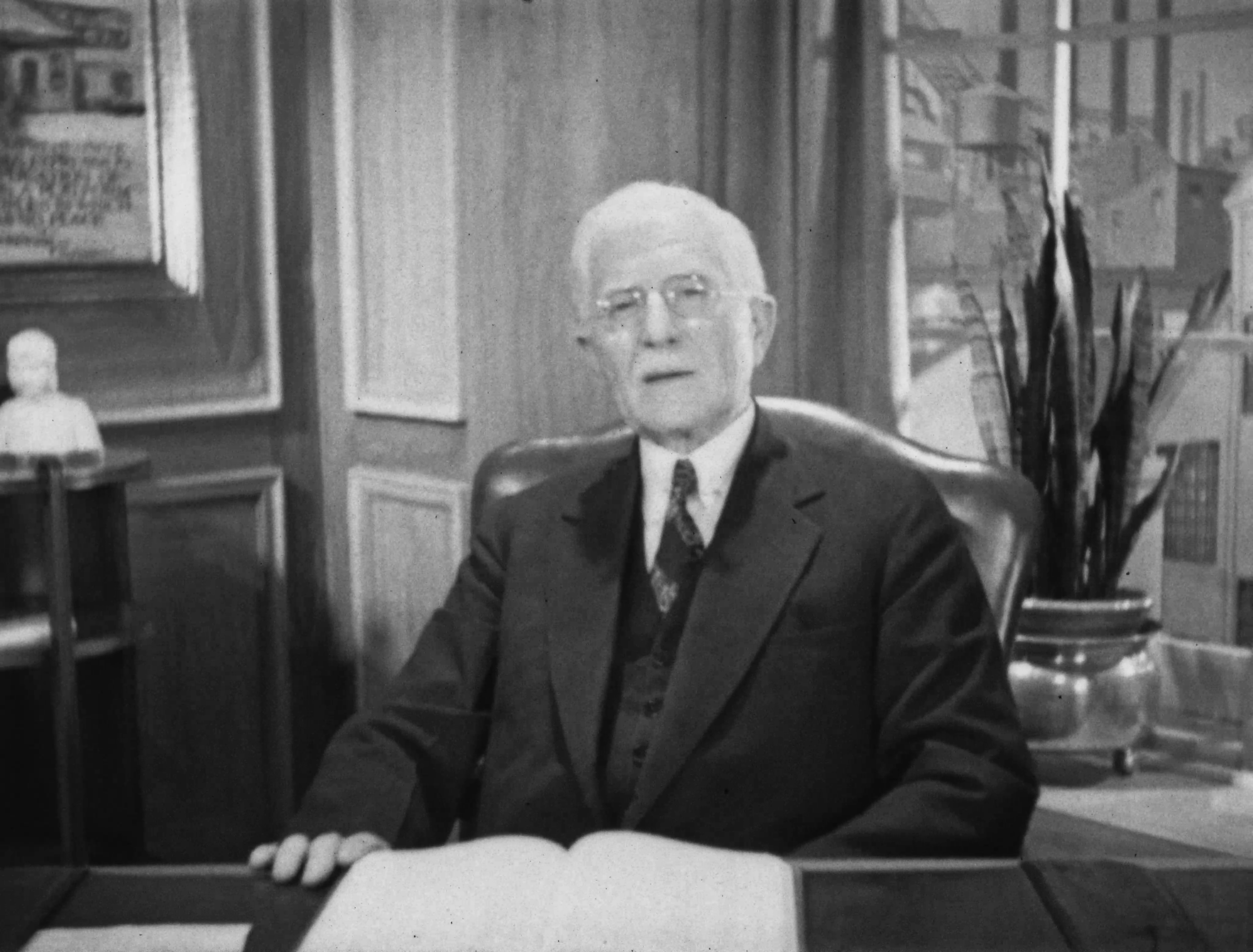
George Verity from the 1938 ARMCO documentary "The Romance of Iron and Steel"

The film is thought to take its name, “The Romance of Iron and Steel,” from the unofficial theme of the 1936-37 Great Lakes Exposition held in Cleveland the year before the film was released.

In 2022, the National Film Preservation Foundation, an organization created by the U.S. Congress to help save America's film heritage, awarded the Hagley Museum and Library a grant to preserve a print of the film discovered in the Cinecraft studio basement in 2021.

== Synopsis and background ==
The film opens with a shirtless blacksmith forging the ARMCO logo, which dissolves into the film title and credits. The film script notes that the ARMCO band plays the background music.

The title segment follows examples of “modern” iron and steel structures. The documentary then examines the importance of research to ARMCO’s success, starting with ARMCO‘s first research lab in 1902. The film then discusses the importance of a key innovation – the ARMCO continuous rolling mill. The film begins with iron ore being unloaded from Great Lakes ore boats and follows the ore through the process of converting it to steel using open hearth furnaces. From the giant furnaces, the steel is rolled into continuous sheets of steel. Then the film looks at the production of stainless steel using giant electric furnaces. In just two minutes, giant 6-inch steel slabs are rolled into thin sheets of steel hundreds of feet long.

The profits of the industry, we learn from the narrator, include that “Armco men work, live, and play in pleasant surroundings: a man who is proud of his home, his community, his company, and its products carries a spirit that is reflected in the work he does, and this is typical of enlightened American industry. Parks, playgrounds, swimming pools, baseball, tennis, golf… These represent healthful recreations and play a wholesome part in the lives of American workers. And so in Armco’s great plants in this country and overseas, there is a conscientious endeavor to promote a spirit of understanding, loyalty, and cooperation.”

It all amounts to a “romance of iron and steel,” the narrator concludes, before ARMCO founder George M. Verity appears to extol the company’s products and its workers - “Only as men can learn to live and work together in understanding and happiness can life bring to all of us its richest rewards.”

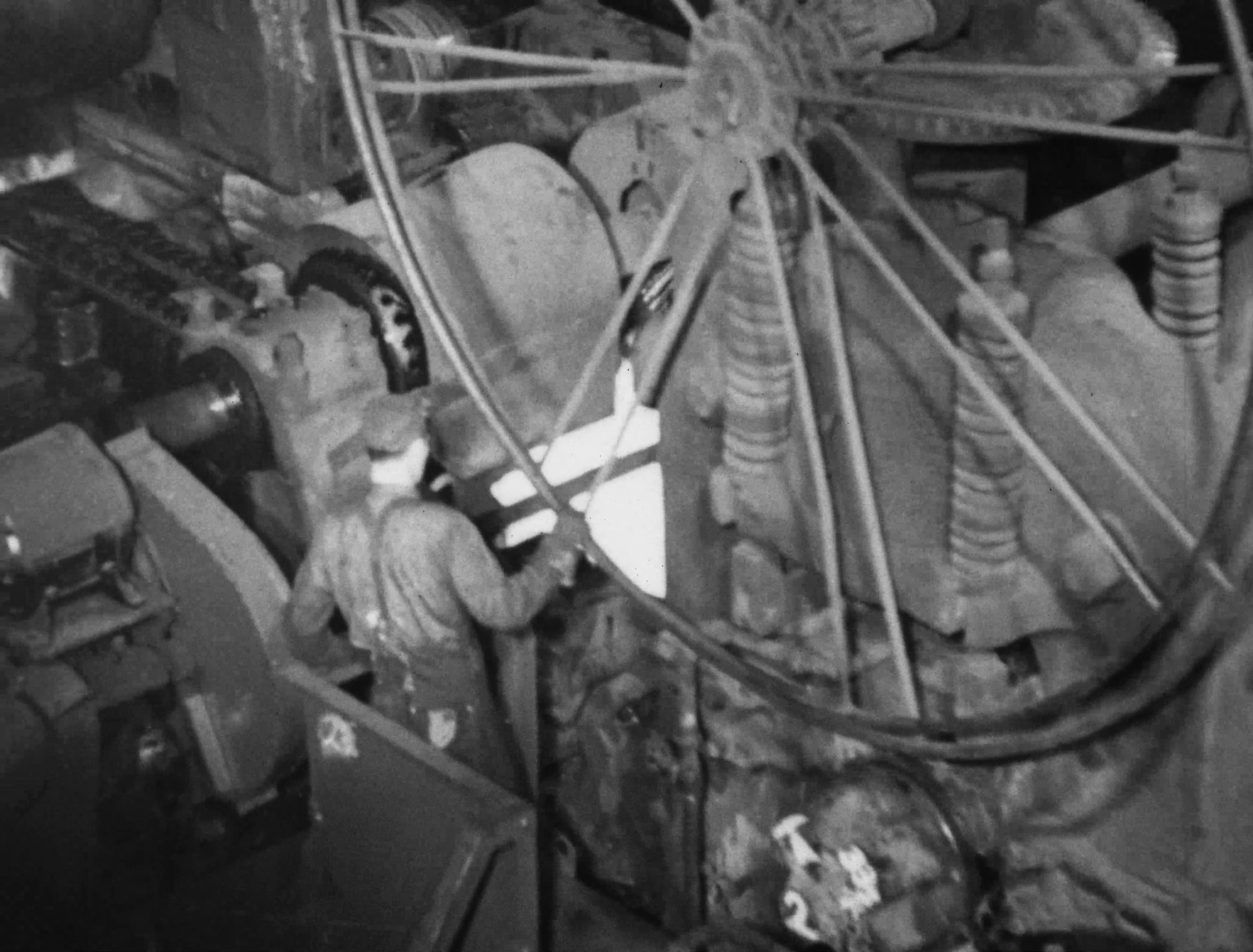
Frame from the tracking shot of a sheet of steel going through the ARMCO rolling mill.

The film includes footage of ore carriers on the Great Lakes and the Hulett ore unloaders at the Cleveland ore docks, ARMCO’s steel plants in Baltimore and Ohio, and in the studios of Tri-State in the Rockefeller Building (Cleveland).

The Cleveland Plain Dealer movie critic W. Ward Marsh wrote “for perfection in all departments (camera work, editing, narration, etc.) neither Hollywood with its too infrequent excursion into the documentary, nor England with its boastful specializing in the documentary have produced anything to beat it. So excellent is the technical work and so genuinely informative is the picture that I urgently recommend it be edited down to single reel length and be issued to movie theaters.”

== Credits ==
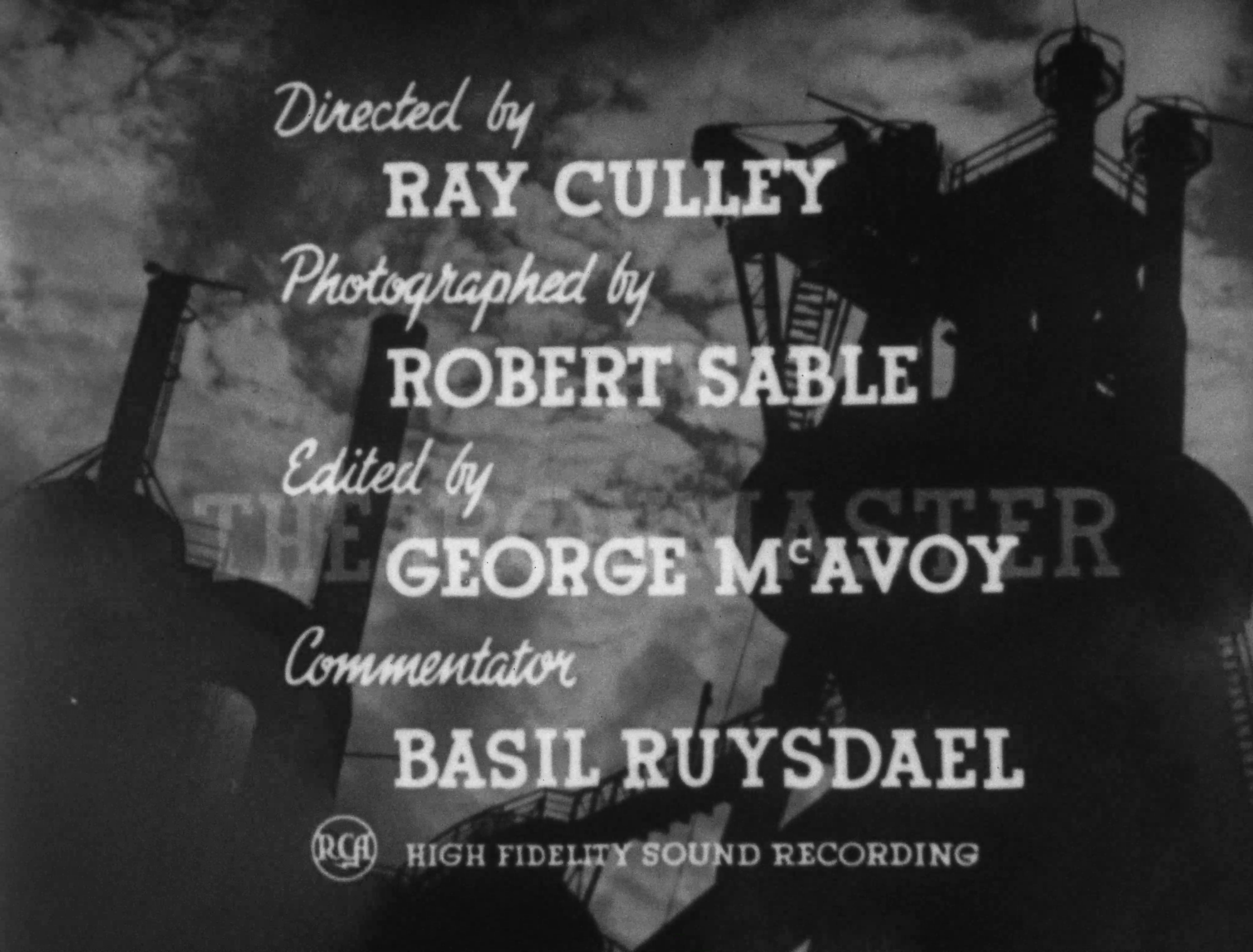
Film credits from the 1938 ARMCO documentary "The Romance of Iron and Steel"

- Ray Culley, Director
- Robert Sable, Photography
- George McAvoy, Editing
- Basil Ruysdael, Commentator
- Studio: The credits in the film’s script attribute the film to Tri-State Productions, but the print of the Hagley Digital Archive preserved with an NFPF grant indicates the film is a “Cinecraft Business Film.” Cinecraft co-founder, Ray Culley, worked on a series of films for Tri-State before founding Cinecraft in 1939. It’s possible the project originated at Tri-State, and Culley inherited it when he started his own studio.
