= It Happened in the Kitchen =

1941 film

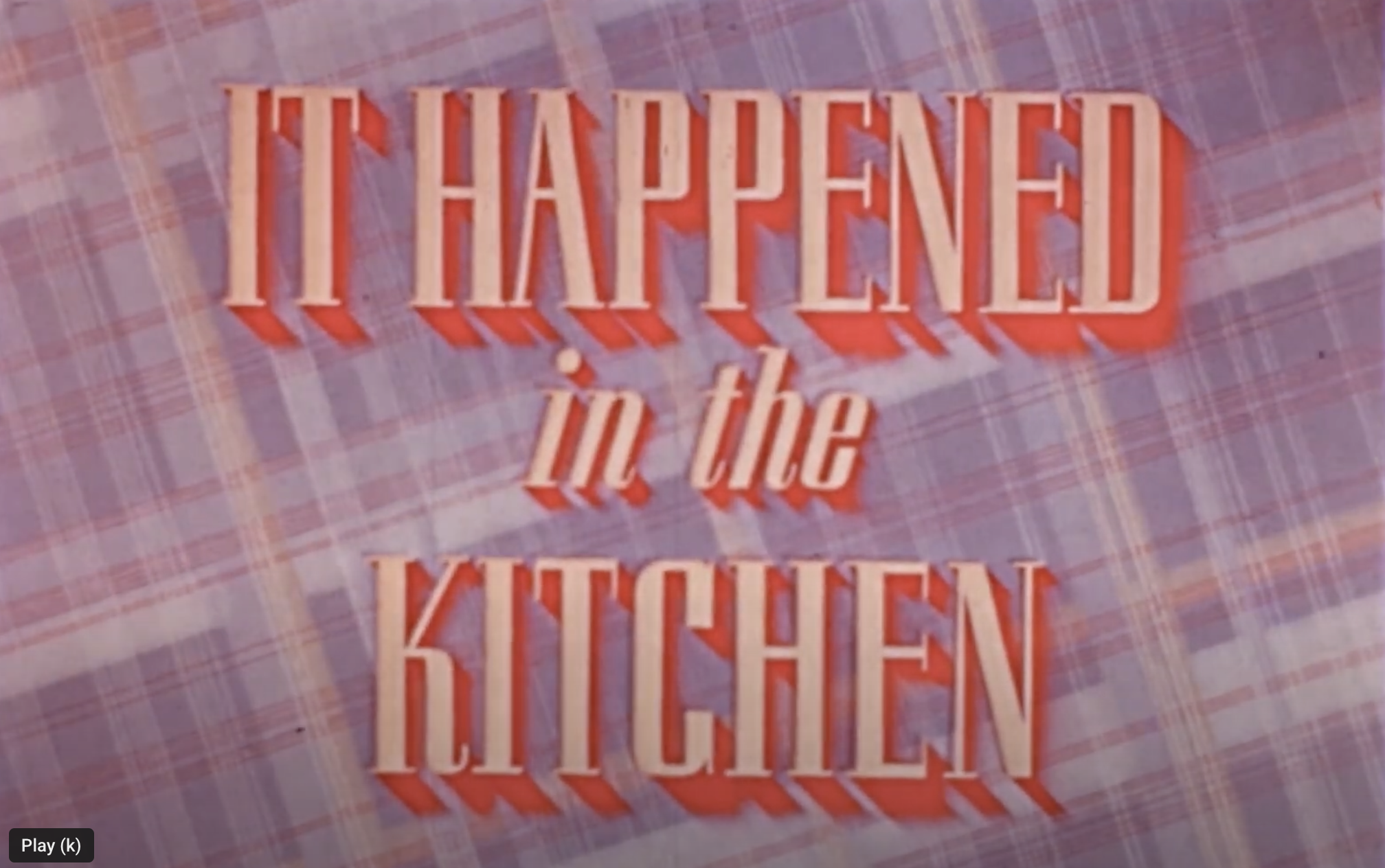
- Title frame
- Directed by: Ray Culley
- Starring: Kirk Willis (Cleveland Play House) as Bob Jones
- Production companies: Cinécraft Productions, Inc.
- Distributed by: Modern Kitchen Bureau
- Release date: 1941
- Running time: 40 minutes
- Country: United States
- Language: English

It Happened in the Kitchen (1941) is a 40-minute Kodachrome consumer-facing film sponsored by The Modern Kitchen Bureau to promote the importance of having a modern kitchen and how modernizing can benefit the average American family.

In 2024, the National Film Preservation Foundation, an organization created by the U.S. Congress to help save America's film heritage, awarded the Hagley Museum and Library a grant to preserve the film.

== Background ==
The Modern Kitchen Bureau was founded in 1936 to promote the idea of a modern electric kitchen. In 1941, the Bureau contracted with Cinécraft Productions, Inc., a sponsored film studio in Cleveland, Ohio to produce a film focusing on the importance of having a modern kitchen and how modernizing benefitted the average American family. An investment in one’s home to improve their quality of life "is the way Americans do things" according to the film.

An article in the October 1941 issue of Electrical Merchandising describes the focus of the film as one of telling “audiences of several hundred people the story of all-electric kitchens in a way once possible with only one or two persons at a time—when a salesman sat down with prospects and went over the story step by step. The picture explains the reason for the three kitchen work centers and the various basic arrangements—covers all kinds of kitchens, old and new, large and small, city, suburban and farm—and does a genuine selling job on electric refrigerators, ranges, water heaters, roasters, dishwasher sinks, and all the other kitchen appliances.”

Cinécraft faced several technical challenges in making the film. The film’s dialogue scenes used dubbed sync sound. For much of the dialogue, the actors talk with their backs to the camera. Occasionally, there is a scene where the actors speak in a wide shot, but their voices are dubbed in. This is a 40-minute film with many such scenes, a rather remarkable feat of careful planning, lip-synching in post-production, and precise editing to make it seem believable.

The film builds on the outdated gender role that men are expected to leave the house to work a job, women are expected to welcome them back with prepared meals.

Although there are no credits on the film itself, the film's male lead is Kirk Willis, a director and actor at the Cleveland Play House. Hollywood-trained Ray Culley, the co-founder of Cinécraft, directed the film.

== Synopsis ==
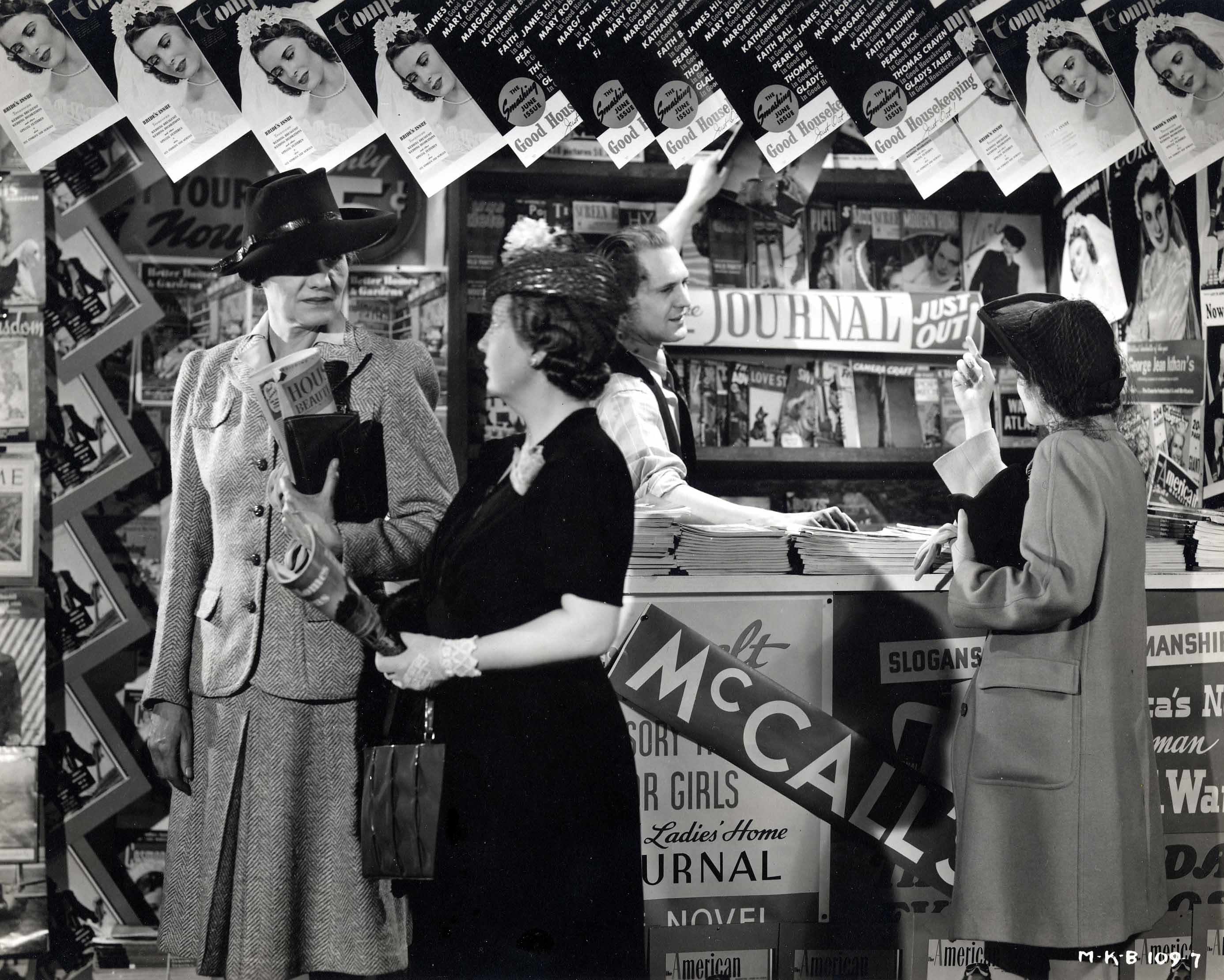
It Happened in the Kitchen (1941) is a 40-minute consumer-facing film sponsored by “The Modern Kitchen Bureau” to promote the importance of having a "modern kitchen" and how modernizing can benefit the average American family.

The pre-World War II film opens with a patriotic theme - The American Aim is that every man, woman, and child may enjoy the better things in life. The film builds on that theme with shots of the American flag, the Statue of Liberty, steel mills, ships on the Great Lakes, freight trains, major highway bridges, city skylines, airplanes, and people standing in line to vote.

Around the 3-minute mark, the film turns to the important role of the kitchen in the American way of life. The kitchen is the heart of the home. The kitchen is a place of refuge. ...

At the 4-minute mark, the film introduces May and Bob Jones, the typical American middle-class family. May pleads with her husband to consider a new, modern kitchen.

Around the 8-minute mark, the film uses the extensive kitchen stories in women’s magazines to introduce the new kitchen remodeling process. Throughout the film, illustrations and color photograms are used to glamorize the modern electric kitchen concept

Around the 10-minute mark, the movie discusses the three major kitchen work centers: the refrigerator and food storage area, the cleaning and dishwashing area, and the cooking and serving center and how these areas fit into three typical kitchen layouts – the U- and L- shaped and double walled kitchens.

Around the 24-minute mark, the film introduces the Art of Cooking and how modern cooking is so much easier with the modern electric kitchen

Around the 31-minute mark, the film gets into the economics of taking on a do-it-yourself project to convert an existing kitchen to a modern all-electric kitchen

The film ends with Bob and May Jones inviting Bob’s boss over to see the family's new kitchen and stay for dinner. Bob’s boss congratulates May and Bob on doing the kitchen job now when they are young and they can enjoy it. He says it’s the way Americans do things.

== Credits ==
- Ray Culley, Director
- Harry Horrocks, Cinematography
- Kirk Willis, Cleveland Play House
- Studio: Cinécraft Productions
