= Louise Winslow =

American actor (1917–2001)

- Born: Louise Marjorie Otterman; August 19, 1917; Indianapolis, Indiana, U.S.
- Died: May 16, 2001; Evergreen, Colorado, U.S.
- Occupations: Actor, director, TV and radio star
- Years active: 1937–1960
- Spouse(s): Morris Winslow and Charles Hutaff

Louise Winslow Hutaff (August 19, 1917 – May 16, 2001) was an American actor. She wrote, directed and starred in radio and TV programs in the United States from 1948 to 1960. She was considered the "Martha Stewart of early daytime television".

She became a nationally known home economist in 1950 when her Adventures in Sewing and Food Is Fun TV shows were syndicated. These programs led to print and TV appearances sponsored by Westinghouse Electric, Sherwin Williams, Kroger Supermarkets, Wear-ever Aluminum Foil, and Scotch Tape.

== TV and Radio Career ==
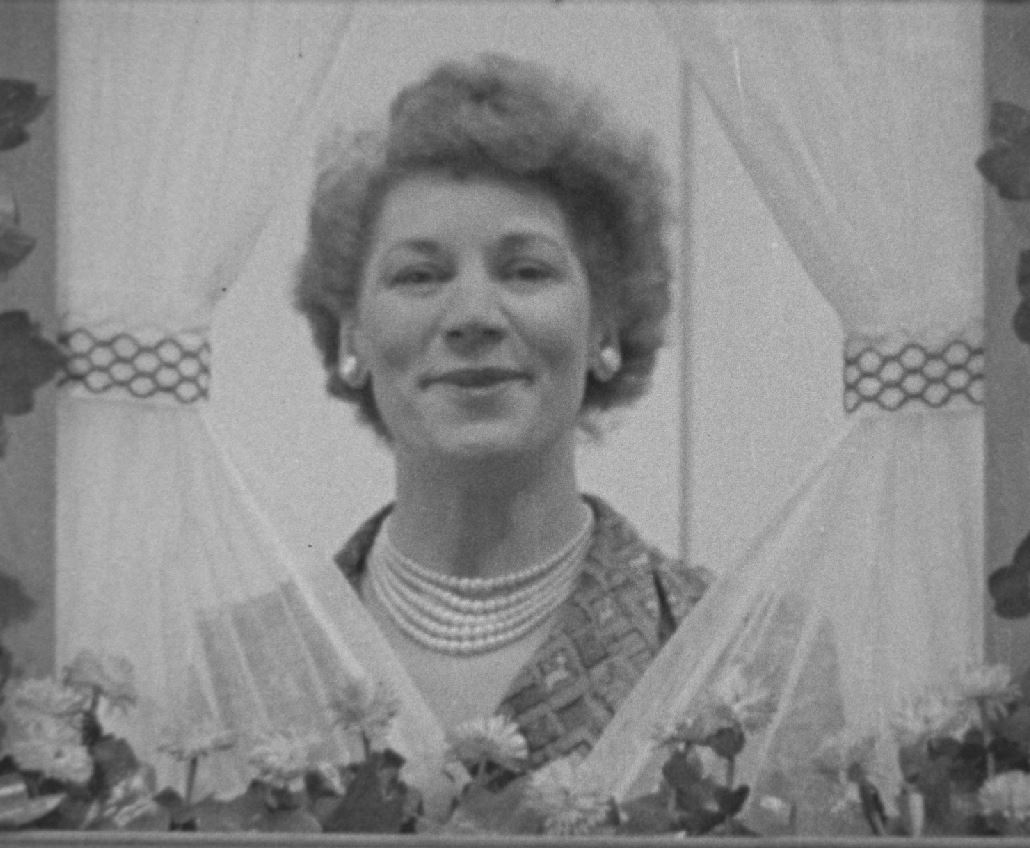
Frame from an episode of the 1948-1950 filmed TV series, "Through the Kitchen Window" starring Louise Winslow. Image courtesy of Hagley Library Digital Archives

In 1948, Winslow originated and starred in Through the Kitchen Window, " a live and later filmed daytime TV program broadcast on WNKB-TV (now WKYC) in Cleveland. The program was one of the first filmed TV programs to capture the program using three cameras filming simultaneously. Cinécraft Productions, the studio producing the shows, called the technique Cinescope. The multi-camera setup preserved picture and sound qualities, cut costs and permitted staggered television showings and the re-use of films.

In 1949, Winslow originated At Home and How, a weekly 30-minute daytime program on WNBT TV in New York City. Her program demonstrated how to perform various household tasks such as cooking and sewing. The series was originally aired on Saturdays before it was moved to run opposite Arthur Godfrey and His Friends on Wednesday nights. Also in 1949, her sewing program called Domestic Designs aired on WNBK-TV in Cleveland.

In 1950 Winslow created Food Is Fun, a TV series sponsored by the American Gas Association.

In the early 1950s, Winslow wrote and starred in Adventures in Sewing a nationally syndicated TV series. An article in Variety on the series noted that the "filmed program amounts to a one-woman stint since Louise Winslow works unassisted for a full 30 minutes to point out tailoring hints and demonstrate the strong points of the Domestic Sewing Machine." The series was produced by Ray Culley of Cinécraft Productions, Inc. through Fuller, Smith & Ross, Inc. ad agency. The new series was modeled after the Domestic Designs program Winslow developed for the Cleveland TV market.

From 1955 to 1959, Winslow hosted the morning radio program Brunch Time on WERE in Cleveland. The show was broadcast from the Tea Room of the Halle Brothers Department Store.

In 1960, Winslow hosted the TV show Louise Winslow for WEWS in Cleveland her last regular TV series.

== Winslow Made-for-TV programs ==
- Through the Kitchen Window (1949)
- Food Is Fun (1950) sponsored by the East Ohio Gas Company
- Adventures in Sewing series: Episode 3. Custom Tailoring a Skirt (1950) sponsored by the Domestic Sewing Machine Company
- Kitchen Chats series: How to Broil Meat (1950) sponsored by Wear-ever Aluminum Foil
- The Easiest Iron You've Ever Used (1951) sponsored by Westinghouse Electric

== Personal life ==
Winslow was born in Indianapolis, Indiana, in 1917. Raised in Indiana and Michigan, she married Morris Winslow in 1937. Though she divorced and remarried, she kept the Winslow name as her stage name for her broadcast career.

Winslow joined the Women's Army Corps shortly after America entered World War II. In 1943, she was the Commanding Officer of the Allied Service Women's Club in Caserta, Italy. She was known as "Ruffles" Winslow throughout the European theatre when she insisted that servicewomen deserved ruffled bedspreads and curtains even in wartime.

Winslow married Charles Hutaff (1916–1998), an advertising executive, in 1950. Louise Winslow and Charles Hutaff are buried in Fort Logan National Cemetery in Denver, Colorado. They had two children.
