= The Long Ships Passing =

1960 film

- Directed by: Paul Culley
- Written by: Fred Lipp
- Produced by: Lake Carriers Association
- Cinematography: Harry Horrocks
- Music by: Dick Wooley
- Production companies: Cinécraft Productions, Inc.
- Release date: May 20, 1960
- Running time: 27 minutes
- Country: United States
- Budget: $30,000 (1960 dollars)

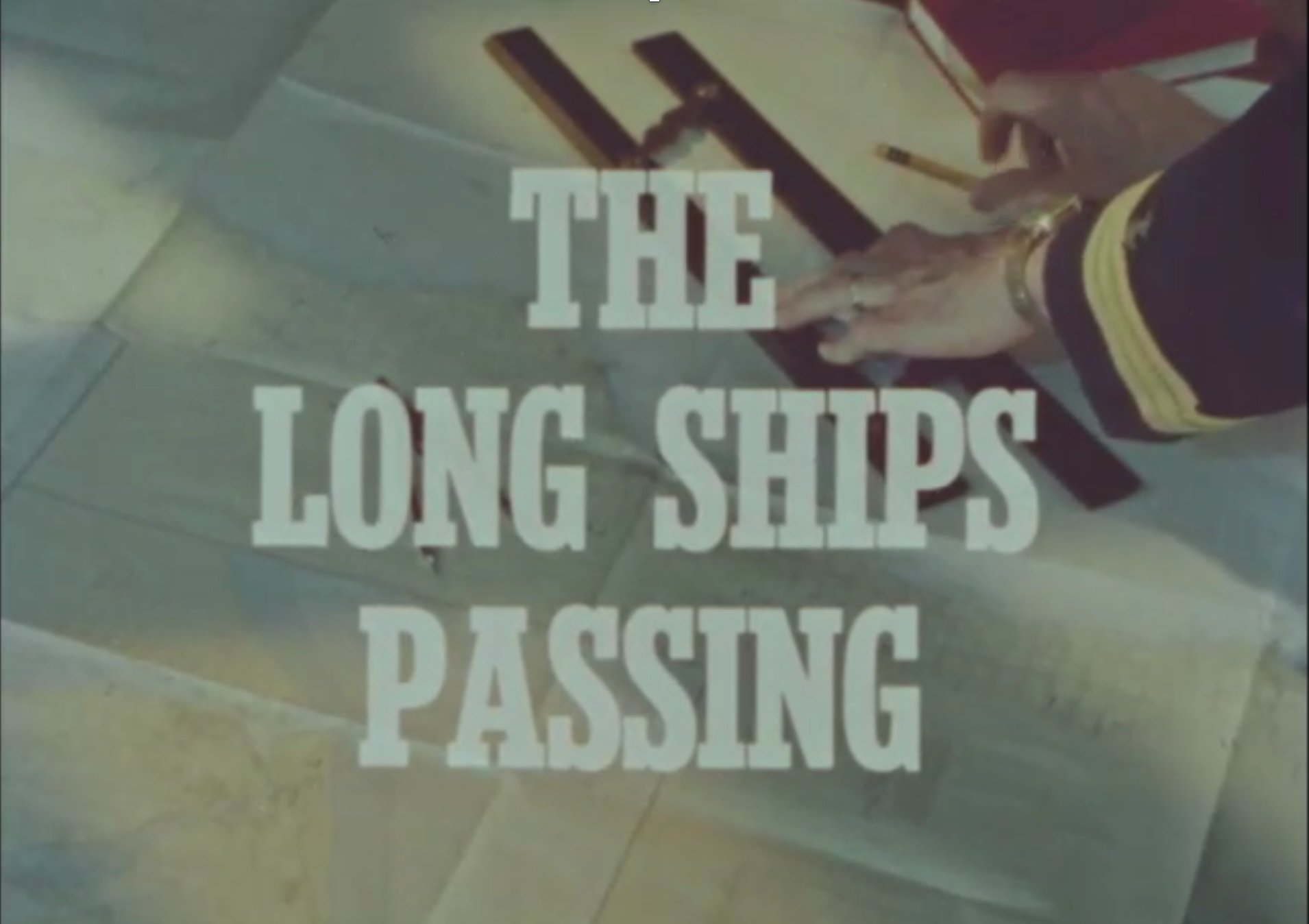
Frame from the film "Long Ships Passing" (1960)

The Long Ships Passing (1960) is a 27-minute, color film produced by Cinécraft Productions for the Lake Carriers Association, a trade association representing lake freighter shipping companies operating on the Great Lakes. Revised at least twice, the film traces the history and features of the 700-foot-long and longer ships that carry bulk cargoes of materials such as limestone, iron ore, grain, coal, or salt from the mines and fields of the upper Great Lakes to the populous industrial areas farther east.

The Lake Carriers Association had an image problem. On November 18, 1958, thirty-three of thirty-five crew members died when the SS Carl D. Bradley sank in a fierce storm. Twenty-three of the crewmembers were from the port town of Rogers City, Michigan. The Bradley held the record for being the longest and largest freighter on the Great Lakes for 22 years. Fifteen years after the film was made, on November 10, 1975, the SS Edmund Fitzgerald carrying a full cargo of iron pellets sank on Lake Superior. Her entire crew of 29 perished. Gordon Lightfoot made the Fitzgerald the subject of his 1976 hit song, "The Wreck of the Edmund Fitzgerald."

Danger wasn't the only cause of recruiting problems for Great Lakes Carriers. Working on the freighters required a special kind of person. The days are long - 4 hours on, 8 hours off, seven days a week from April to November.

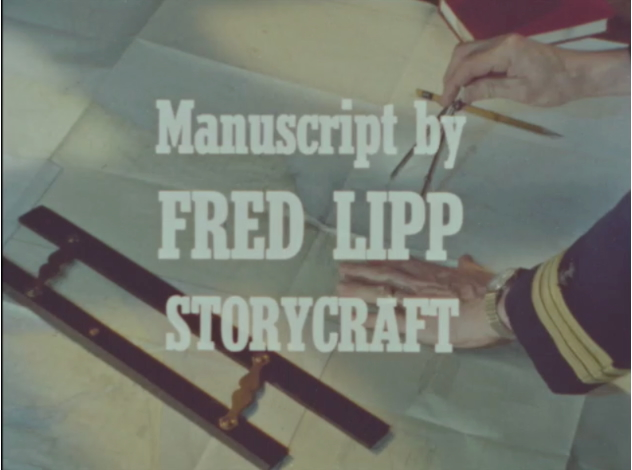
Frame from the film "Long Ships Passing" (1960)

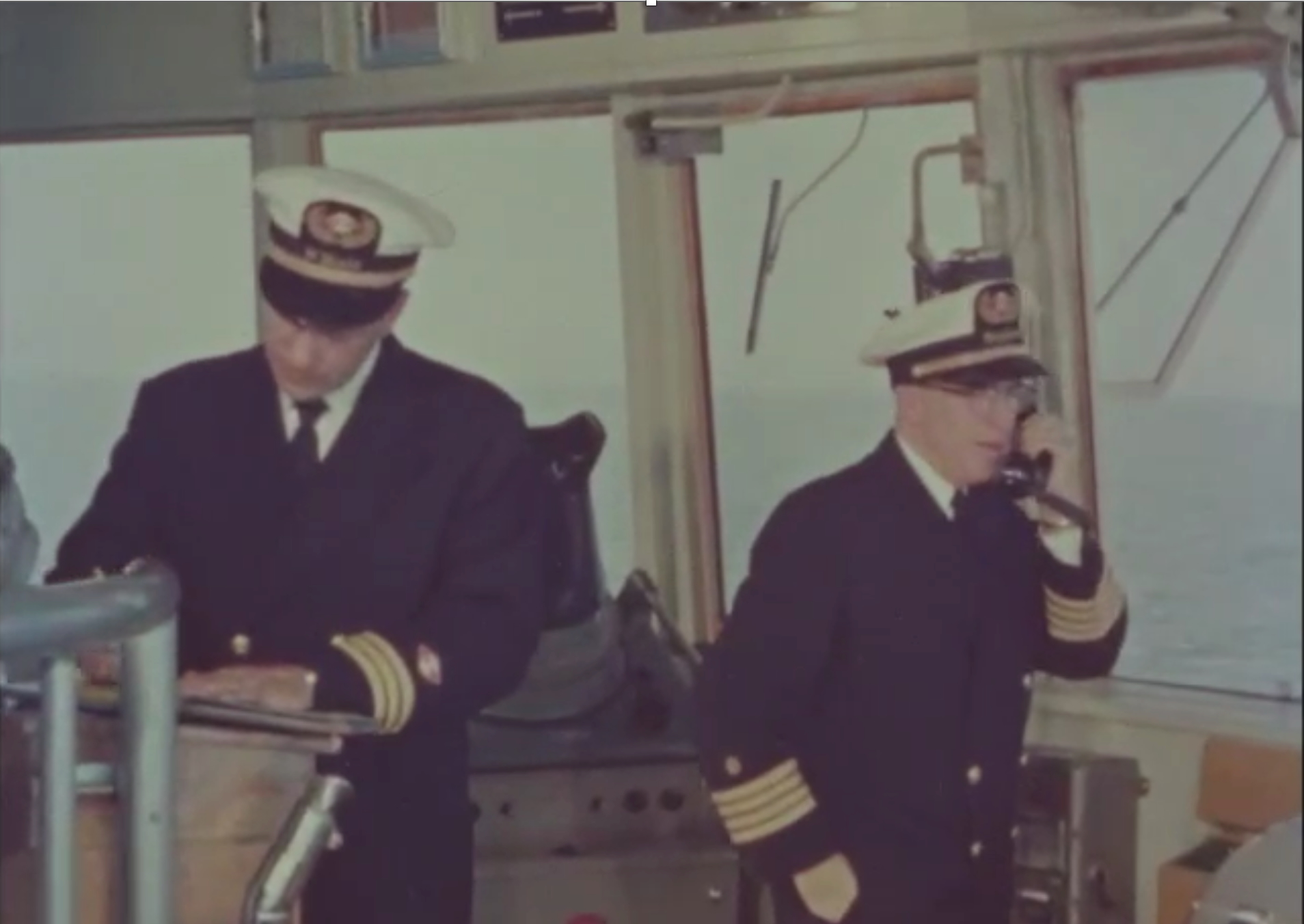
Frame from the film "Long Ships Passing" (1960)

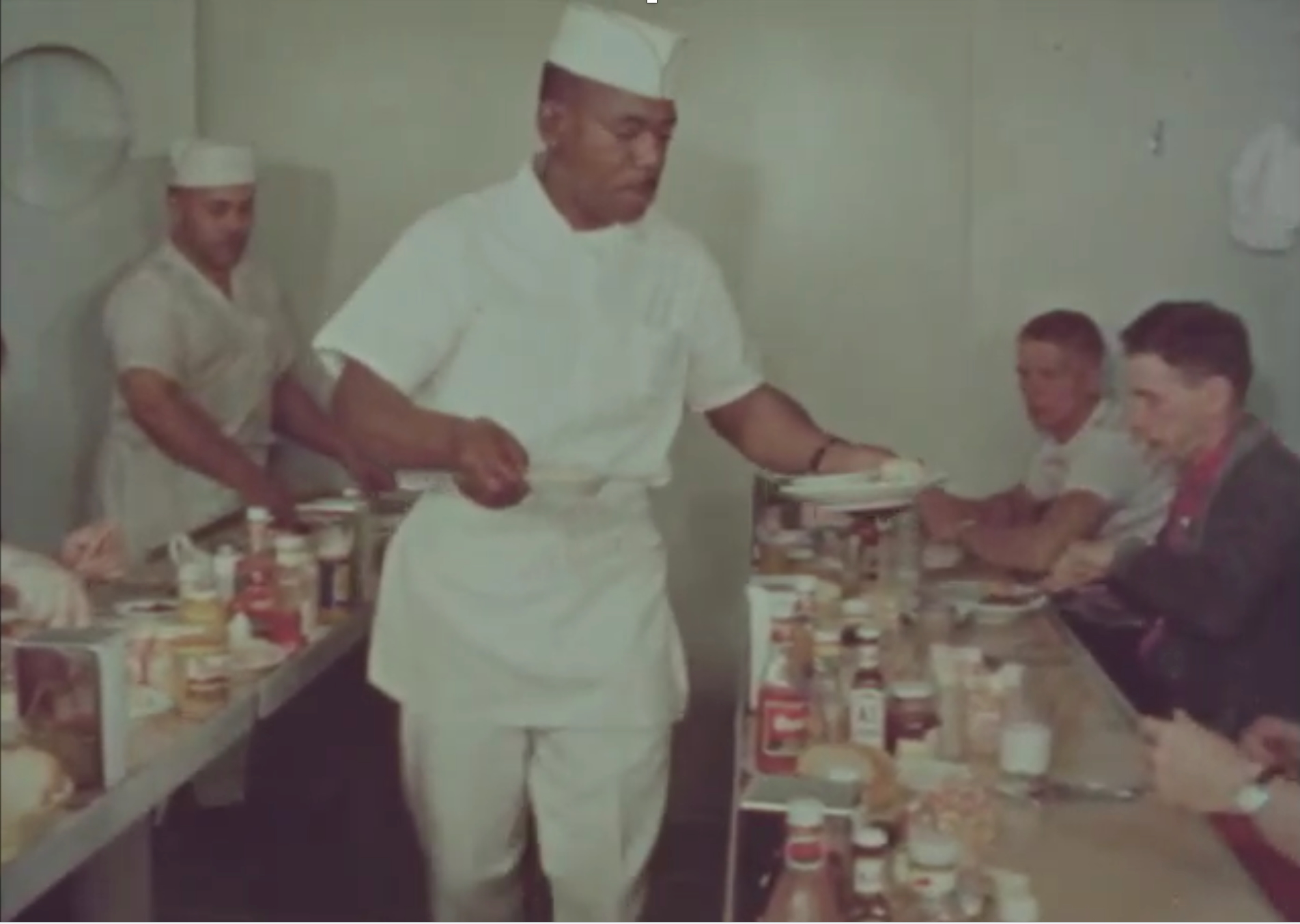
Frame from the film "Long Ships Passing" (1960)

An Association memo summarized the film's requirements: "Impress on the public the great importance of the Great Lakes shipping industry to the United States, both in peace and in war; to spread understanding of its activities and problems and to win friends for the industry; to help interest youths in a career on the lakes."

== Synopsis of film ==
The first half of the clip showcases the various types of Great Lakes ships and their respective cargoes.

The second half presents a view of life aboard one of these ships.

== Production and background ==
Great Lakes ore carriers carry the equivalent of 220 railcar loads. As the Narrator in the film says, "There are no ships like them anywhere in the world."

The film requirements included a list of important shots: locks at Soo St. Marie, Duluth Superior Harbor, the Coast Guard Carrier "Mackinaw," the mail boat in the Detroit River, the limestone loading docks at Port Inland, Galcite or Presque Isle, and "whistle talk."

To meet this requirement, the studio had to have a film crew ready to fly or drive to the location where the ships would be filmed as they arrived or departed port.

A letter to Paul Culley, the film's director, presents the type of logistical problems facing the filmmakers:

"The schedule we provided you when work on shooting started called for a picture of the [Alexander T.] Wood. This vessel will not be up this way in the immediate future. However, owners of the ship, the Wilson Marine Transit Co, will let us know immediately the first time it is scheduled for Lake Erie or will provide transportation on its plane for a photographer to go to Seven Islands or Contrecoeur, Quebec."

The film was also challenging because the filming in those days required long set up times, powerful lights (10,000 watts), bulky and heavy equipment to lug up and down narrow, steep stairs, and quiet sets for good sound – a challenge on any set – but a real challenge on a working freighter.

Although most ships only appear for a few seconds in the film and not one of the ships is mentioned by name, the Association was firm in the requirement that all their members' fleets be represented. The original film included the following ships:

- A ship from the Steinbrenner Fleet, probably the Findlay
- Adam E. Cornelius or Detroit Edison: Boland & Cornelis Fleet
- C. L. Hutchinson
- Cliffs Victory or E.B. Greene: Cleveland Cliffs Fleet
- Herbert C. Jackson: Interlake Steamship Co.
- J.E. McAlpina: Brown & Co.
- J.J.H. Brown: Brown & Co.
- Motor Vessel: Alexander T. Wood: Wilson Marine Transit Co.
- Motor Vessel: Paul H. Townsend: Huron Portland Cement Co.
- Steamer Adam E. Cornelius (self-loader): Roland & Cornelius
- Steamer Charles L. Hutchinson: Hutchinson & Co.
- Steamer Charles M. White: Republic Steel Corp.
- Steamer Cliffs Victory: Cleveland-Cliffs Iron Co.
- Steamer Fitzgerald: Oglebay Norton Co.
- Steamer George M. Humphrey: M.A. Hanna Co.
- Steamer John G. Munson: Bradley Transportation Line
- Steamer McCarthy: T.J. McCarthy Steamship Co.
- Steamer Shenango II: Shenango Furnace Co.
- Steamer Sparrows Point: Bethlehem Transportation Corp.
- Steamer Sykes: Inland Steel Co. (mentioned also in Dec. 21, 1959 letter)
- Steamer William Benson Ford: Ford Motor Co.
- Tanker: Martha Allan: National Marine Services, Inc.
- The Huron, Conneaut, Alpena, or Wyandotte: Wyandotte Fleet
- Whaleback Meteor: Cleveland Takers, Inc.
