= Alois Havrilla =

American radio announcer and singer

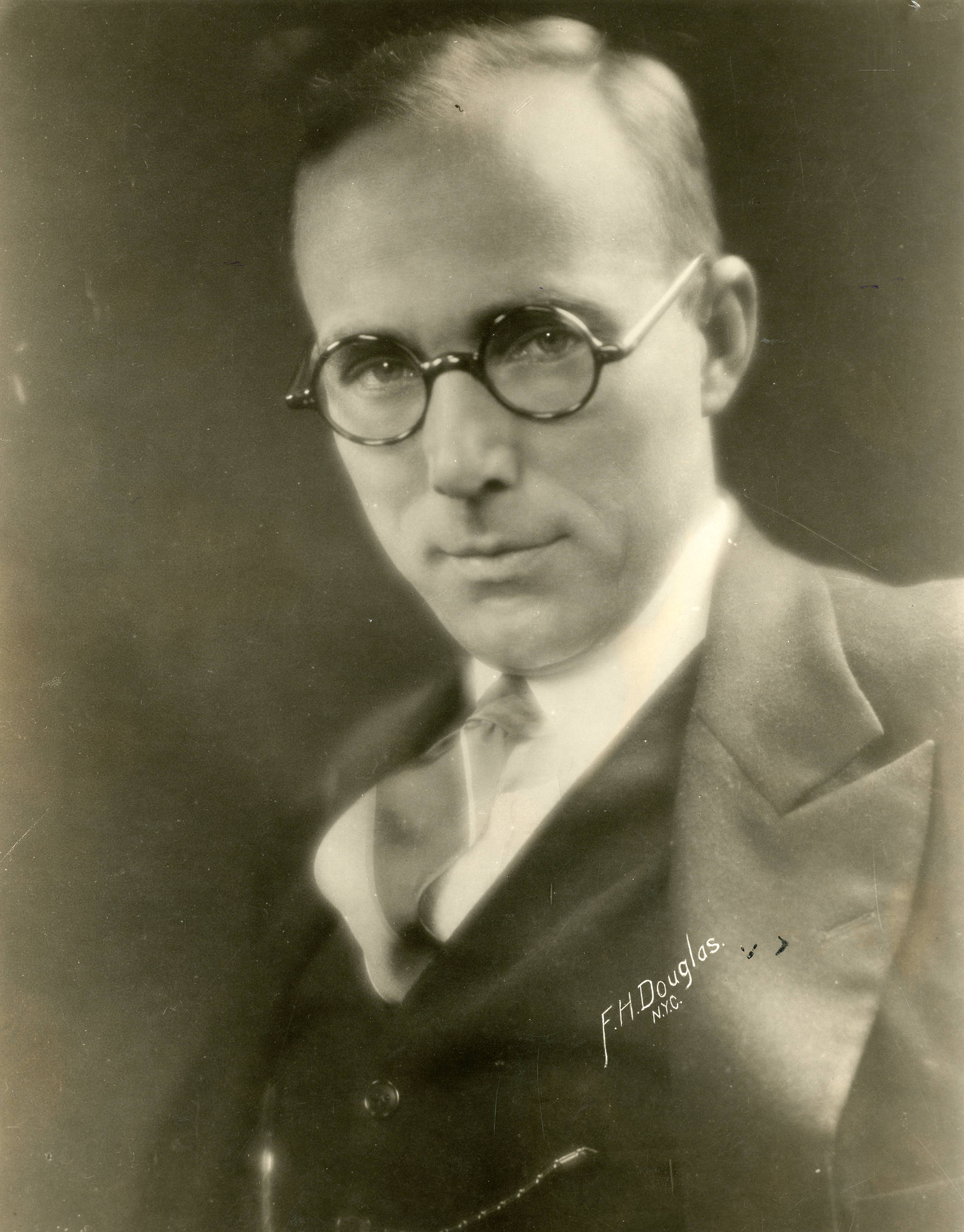

Alois Havrilla (July 6, 1891 – December 8, 1952) was a Slovak American radio announcer and singer, best known for his role as announcer on The Jack Benny Program from 1933-1934.

== Early years ==
Havrilla was born on July 6, 1891, in Prešov, now Slovakia (before Austria-Hungary), and came to the United States with his family when he was four years old. His father, John, was a pharmacist who brought his family to Bridgeport, Connecticut.

Havrilla spoke no English when he arrived, and that condition continued as he attended a Bridgeport school in which classes were taught in his native language. As a little boy he sang folks songs of his native land at church parties and social events. He began to learn English at age seven, as John Baker, who was choir director at Bridgeport Trinity Church, taught him singing and speech. At that time he had an alto voice with a three-octave range, but by age 16 his voice had changed to baritone.

Havrilla became an apprentice civil engineer with a railroad in New England when he was 13 years old. That commitment took most of his time, limiting his musical activities to singing in a choir. His effort to enlist in the military as the United States entered World War I was thwarted by his poor vision. He eventually was drafted for service, but 13 days after joining the military he was rejected again.

Returning to civilian life, he began studying music at New York University, which led to his teaching music in New Jersey's public schools. Later he taught music in public schools in Briarcliff Manor, New York.

A 1923 Carnegie Hall concert, in which he was soloist with Percy Grainger, attracted the attention of Graham McNamee and Elliot Shaw. They pointed him toward a career in radio.

== Career ==
Beginning a career that led to his becoming "one of the highest paid staff announcers on the big networks", Havrilla worked in radio in New York City from 1924 to 1946 as announcer, commentator, and narrator on programs. At various times he was employed by WABC, WEAF, WJZ, and WOR, all in New York City. In 1946 he began working at WNJR in Newark, New Jersey, and WPAT in Paterson, New Jersey. His duties at WNJR included being host of Alois Havrilla Presents, a program that featured recordings of popular and semi-classical music supplemented by Havrilla's comments about his personal knowledge of composers and performers.

Network programs for which Havrilla was the announcer included The Jack Benny Program, The Palmolive Hour, Strange as It Seems, Colgate House Party, Conoco Presents, Spartan Triolians, and Double or Nothing.

Havrilla's voice was heard from 1928 to 1946 as narrator and commentator for travelogues from RKO and for films from Paramount Pictorial, Pathe Newsreel, and Universal Pictures. Films that he narrated included This Is America (1933), This Is China (1937), The World's Largest Electrical Workshop (1938), You Bet Your Life (1939), and Hercules Land (1944).

Havrilla also performed on Broadway in Hassan (1924), Louie the 14th (1925), and Princess Flavia (1925).

== Recognition ==
In 1935, Havrilla received the radio diction medal, "given on the basis of pronunciation, articulation, tone quality, accent and cultural effect", from the American Academy of Arts and Letters.

== Personal life and death ==
When Havrilla lived in Briarcliff Manor, he directed the Briarcliff unit of the Westchester Choral Union and two choirs at the Briarcliff Congregational Church.

Havrilla married Marion Munson, whom he had met when both sang at Bridgeport's Universalist Church, on September 28, 1928, and they had a daughter.

He died on December 8, 1952, in Englewood Hospital, aged 61.

== Papers ==
Havrilla's papers are housed in the University of Maryland Libraries' archival collections. They include correspondence, manuscripts, newspaper clippings, photographs, scrapbooks, scripts, and sheet music. Items in the collection date from 1893 to 1965, with most coming from the 1920s and 1930s.
