= From Now On (1937 movie) =

1937 feature-length romantic comedy directed by Hamilton MacFadden

- Directed by: Hamilton MacFadden
- Written by: Paul Schofield (screenwriter)
- Starring: Irvin S. Cobb; Louise Stanley; Alan Baxter; Regis Toomey; Wally Albright
- Cinematography: Alvin Wyckoff
- Edited by: Mildred Johnston
- Production company: Tri-State Pictures
- Distributed by: Modern Talking Picture Service
- Release date: May 24, 1937
- Running time: 60 minutes
- Country: United States
- Language: English
- Budget: $200,000

From Now On is a 60-minute 1937 American romantic comedy directed by Hamilton MacFadden.

Irvin S. Cobb, the first actor of star caliber hired to star in a major sponsored film, received top billing. The movie also featured Alan Baxter, Louise Stanley, and Regis Toomey.

The 6-reel, black-and-white film premiered on May 24, 1937, at Radio City's 3,400-seat Center Theatre in New York City. The showing was coupled with the 9:30 to 10 PM NBC network broadcast of The Hour of Charm, a popular mid-20th-century radio program also sponsored by G.E.

After an initial run in regular motion picture theatres that focused on the G.E. salesforce and distributors, G.E. allowed the theatres to continue running the film for their traditional audiences.

Most of the filming was done on the stages of Republic Pictures in Los Angeles.

A similar General Electric feature-length 35mm sponsored film titled “Three Women” was shown country-wide the year before. The primary goal of both films was to act as entertaining vehicles for product placement showcasing GE's modern electric kitchen and household appliances.

== Plot ==
From Now On tells the story of a youthful banker, played by Alan Baxter, engaged to a heroine, played by Louise Stanley. Baxter, like his confirmed bachelor friend, played by Irvin S. Cobb, is old-fashioned. The bachelor friend prefers an old-fashioned house and kitchen, making a single concession: an icebox.

The film deals with Baxter's love problems and plans of building an electrified home on a limited budget. Baxter buys an old apartment house and believes in a plan suggested by the heroine's younger brother, played by Wally Albright. Albright uses his sister's "perfect house" scrapbook to design her dream house.

In a review of the film, W. Ward Marsh, the film critic for the Cleveland Plain Dealer, wrote, "I had the feeling that when “From Now On” first opened I was in for a new kind of treat - a documentary picture of first order."

“The scenes were in a huge power plant with the generators in operation, but the spectator goes with the current from the plant to the lines to the relay stations and then by wires to a home, and there a romance begins.”

Ward goes on to write that "The photography is on par with any of Hollywood's best product and the sound is excellent."

"From Now On so conceals its advertising that rarely is the spectator conscious that the GE’s model homes and model kitchens are constantly before him giving him selling arguments.” "From Now On" is a celluloid triumph for Tri-State, a Cleveland Concern."

== Cast ==
- Irvin S. Cobb as bachelor friend
- Louise Stanley as heroine
- Alan Baxter as Banker engaged to heroine
- Regis Toomey
- Wally Albright as Heroine's young brother
- Dorothy Christy

== Crew ==
- Production Company – General Electric
- Director – Hamilton MacFadden
- Producer - X. F. Sutton
- Production managers – Ray Culley and Philip Meek
- Writer – Paul Schofield (screenwriter)
- Head cameraman - Alvin Wyckoff
