= The World's Largest Electrical Workshop =

1938 film

- Directed by: Ray Culley
- Narrated by: Alois Havrilla
- Cinematography: Robert Sable
- Production company: Tri-State Motion Pictures
- Release date: 1938
- Running time: 30 minutes
- Country: United States
- Language: English

The World's Largest Electrical Workshop (1938), is a 30-minute, black and white, sound documentary film produced by Tri-State Pictures for General Electric. The film examines GE's research and manufacturing facilities in the U.S. and Canada, highlights key GE inventors, and shows GE workers manufacturing a variety of products, including radios, refrigerators, televisions, and turbines.

The film's entry in the 1946 Educational Film Guide describes the movie as providing "an intimate glimpse into America's largest electrical workshop".

== Background ==
An article in Business Screen indicates that "The World's Largest Electrical Workshop" was included in a 50-city 1939 GE appliance dealer/distributor program called "Get Over Into Clover." The program included the movie and a professional stage show. Two full crews were hired to put on the program – one in the east and one in the west. Each crew had its own special Pullman car, baggage car, professional actors, stage sets, stage crew, and projection equipment.

On January 27, 1939, the movie and stage show were presented to an audience of national trade and consumer magazine editors.

"The World's Largest Electrical Workshop" was one of three GE-sponsored films on the benefits of electricity produced by Tri-State Motion Pictures and coordinated by Fuller & Smith & Ross, an advertising agency. The other two films were "From Now On" (1937), a five-reel movie showing how a newly married couple can build an electrified home on a limited budget, and "Bill Howard R.F.D. " (1937). This "six-reel" motion picture shows how the advantages of electricity can benefit farmers.

== Synopsis ==
Alois Havrilla, the film's narrator, opens the movie saying: "The march is on the steady march of a new peacetime army, in the quest for a better way of living. Men, money, knowledge, research machines, visions carefully, painstakingly perfecting, which contribute to man's mastery of his destiny."

As a huge electrical storm wages outside, the film peers through a window to see a grandfather explaining electricity to his granddaughter.

In the section that follows, the film discusses the contributions of famous GE scientists.
