= List of Lippert Pictures films =

A list of films produced or released by the American distributor Lippert Pictures. Founded by Robert L. Lippert in 1945, the company's initial releases were often known as "Screen Guild Productions". Later it enjoyed success by co-producing and releasing films by the British studio Exclusive Films. From 1955 Lippert dissolved his original company and began producing films to be released by 20th Century Fox, often under the "Regal Films" label.

== 1940s ==
Title	American Release Date	Director	Notes
Wildfire	July 18, 1945	Robert Emmett Tansey	
Northwest Trail	November 30, 1945	Derwin Abrahams	
God's Country	March 15, 1946	Robert Emmett Tansey	
Death Valley	August 15, 1946	Lew Landers	
Flight to Nowhere	October 1, 1946	William Rowland	
'Neath Canadian Skies	October 15, 1946	B. Reeves Eason	
Rolling Home	November 1, 1946	William Berke	
North of the Border	November 15, 1946	B. Reeves Eason	
My Dog Shep	December 1, 1946	Ford Beebe	
Renegade Girl	December 25, 1946	William Berke	
Queen of the Amazons	January 15, 1947	Edward Finney	
Scared to Death	February 1, 1947	Christy Cabanne	
Bells of San Fernando	March 1, 1947	Terry O. Morse	
Shoot to Kill	March 15, 1947	William Berke	
Buffalo Bill Rides Again	April 19, 1947	Bernard B. Ray	
Bush Pilot	June 7, 1947	Sterling Campbell	
The Hat Box Mystery	June 12, 1947	Lambert Hillyer	
Hollywood Barn Dance	June 21, 1947	Bernard B. Ray	
The Case of the Baby Sitter	July 26, 1947	Lambert Hillyer	
Killer Dill	August 2, 1947	Lewis D. Collins	
Dragnet	August 16, 1947	Leslie Goodwins	
The Burning Cross	September 1, 1947	Walter Colmes	
The Prairie	November 27, 1947	Frank Wisbar	
Road to the Big House	December 13, 1947	Walter Colmes	
Where the North Begins	December 13, 1947	Howard Bretherton	
Trail of the Mounties	December 20, 1947	Howard Bretherton	
Jungle Goddess	August 13, 1948	Lewis D. Collins	
The Return of Wildfire	August 13, 1948	Ray Taylor	
Dead Man's Gold	September 10, 1948	Ray Taylor	
Harpoon	September 24, 1948	Ewing Scott	
Mark of the Lash	October 15, 1948	Ray Taylor	
Thunder in the Pines	November 11, 1948	Robert Gordon	
Shep Comes Home	December 3, 1949	Ford Beebe	
Frontier Revenge	December 17, 1948	Ray Taylor	
Last of the Wild Horses	December 27, 1948	Robert L. Lippert	
Highway 13	December 28, 1948	William Berke	
Outlaw Country	January 7, 1949	Ray Taylor	
I Shot Jesse James	February 26, 1949	Samuel Fuller	
Rimfire	March 25, 1949	B. Reeves Eason	
Son of Billy the Kid	April 2, 1949	Ray Taylor	
Grand Canyon	May 20, 1949	Paul Landres	
Omoo-Omoo, the Shark God	June 10, 1949	Leon Leonard	
Arson, Inc.	June 24, 1949	William Berke	
The Dark Road	July 7, 1949	Alfred J. Goulding	Made in Britain
Ringside	July 14, 1949	Frank McDonald	
Sky Liner	July 28, 1949	William Berke	
Treasure of Monte Cristo	August 27, 1949	William Berke	
The Dalton Gang	October 21, 1949	Ford Beebe	
Deputy Marshal	October 28, 1949	William Berke	
Apache Chief	November 4, 1949	Frank McDonald	
Square Dance Jubilee	November 11, 1949	Paul Landres	
Tough Assignment	November 15, 1949	William Beaudine	
Call of the Forest	November 18, 1949	John F. Link	
Red Desert	December 17, 1949	Ford Beebe	

== 1950s ==
Title	American Release Date	Director	Notes
Hollywood Varieties	January 15, 1950	Paul Landres	
Radar Secret Service	January 28, 1950	Sam Newfield	
The Baron of Arizona	March 1, 1950	Samuel Fuller	
Western Pacific Agent	March 17, 1950	Sam Newfield	
Hostile Country	March 24, 1950	Thomas Carr	
Everybody's Dancin'	March 31, 1950	Will Jason	
Marshal of Heldorado	April 21, 1950	Thomas Carr	
Crooked River	May 5, 1950	Thomas Carr	
Operation Haylift	May 5, 1950	William Berke	
Colorado Ranger	May 12, 1950	Thomas Carr	
Motor Patrol	May 12, 1950	Sam Newfield	
Rocketship X-M	May 26, 1950	Kurt Neumann	
West of the Brazos	June 2, 1950	Thomas Carr	
Fast on the Draw	June 30, 1950	Thomas Carr	
Hi-Jacked	July 7, 1950	Sam Newfield	
I Shot Billy the Kid	July 27, 1950	William Berke	
Gunfire	August 5, 1950	William Berke	
The Return of Jesse James	September 8, 1950	Arthur Hilton	
Train to Tombstone	September 16, 1950	William Berke	
Border Rangers	October 6, 1950	William Berke	
Holiday Rhythm	October 13, 1950	Jack Scholl	
The Bandit Queen	December 9, 1950	William Berke	
The Steel Helmet	January 10, 1951	Samuel Fuller	
Three Desperate Men	January 12, 1951	Sam Newfield	
Fingerprints Don't Lie	February 23, 1951	Sam Newfield	
Mask of the Dragon	March 10, 1951	Sam Newfield	
Stop That Cab	March 30, 1951	Eugenio de Liguoro	
Danger Zone	April 20, 1951	William Berke	
Tales of Robin Hood	May 1, 1951	James Tinling	
Roaring City	May 4, 1951	William Berke	
Pier 23	May 11, 1951	William Berke	
Kentucky Jubilee	May 18, 1951	Ron Ormond	
Little Big Horn	June 15, 1951	Charles Marquis Warren	
Savage Drums	June 22, 1951	William Berke	
G.I. Jane	July 6, 1951	Reginald LeBorg	
Yes Sir, Mr. Bones	July 13, 1951	Ron Ormond	
Varieties on Parade	July 20, 1951	Ron Ormond	
Lost Continent	August 17, 1951	Sam Newfield	
Leave It to the Marines	September 28, 1951	Sam Newfield	
As You Were	October 5, 1951	Bernard Girard	
Highly Dangerous	October 12, 1951	Roy Ward Baker	Made in Britain
Sky High	October 19, 1951	Sam Newfield	
Unknown World	October 26, 1951	Terry O. Morse	
FBI Girl	November 4, 1951	William Berke	
Superman and the Mole Men	November 23, 1951	Lee Sholem	
The Adventurers	December 7, 1951	David MacDonald	Made in Britain
For Men Only	January 11, 1952	Paul Henreid	
The Last Page	January 25, 1952	Terence Fisher	Made in Britain
Navajo	February 12, 1952	Norman Foster	Documentary
Stronghold	February 15, 1952	Steve Sekely	
Wings of Danger	April 1, 1952	Terence Fisher	Made in Britain
Valley of Eagles	April 25, 1952	Terence Young	Made in Britain
Outlaw Women	April 28, 1952	Sam Newfield, Ron Ormond	
Loan Shark	May 23, 1952	Seymour Friedman	
Stolen Face	June 16, 1952	Terence Fisher	Made in Britain
The Jungle	August 1, 1952	William Berke	
Secret People	August 29, 1952	Thorold Dickinson	Made in Britain
Hellgate	September 5, 1952	Charles Marquis Warren	
Lady in the Fog	October 31, 1952	Sam Newfield	Made in Britain
Mr. Walkie Talkie	November 28, 1952	Fred Guiol	
Gambler and the Lady	December 26, 1952	Sam Newfield	Made in Britain
Escape Route	January 16, 1953	Seymour Friedman, Peter Graham Scott	Made in Britain
The Tall Texan	February 13, 1953	Elmo Williams	
Perils of the Jungle	March 20, 1953	George Blair	
The Flanagan Boy	April 10, 1953	Reginald LeBorg	Made in Britain
Song of Paris	April 17, 1953	John Guillermin	Made in Britain
Women of Twilight	May 15, 1953	Gordon Parry	Made in Britain
Cosh Boy	May 29, 1953	Lewis Gilbert	Made in Britain
Spaceways	June 24, 1953	Terence Fisher	Made in Britain
The Great Jesse James Raid	July 17, 1953	Reginald LeBorg	
Project Moonbase	September 4, 1953	Richard Talmadge	
Sins of Jezebel	September 4, 1953	Reginald LeBorg	
Street of Shadows	October 16, 1953	Richard Vernon	Made in Britain
The Man from Cairo	November 27, 1953	Ray Enright	
36 Hours	December 4, 1953	Montgomery Tully	Made in Britain
Three Steps to the Gallows	January 1, 1954	John Gilling	Made in Britain
Hollywood Thrill-Makers	January 15, 1954	Bernard B. Ray	
Face the Music	January 29, 1954	Terence Fisher	Made in Britain
Fangs of the Wild	March 5, 1954	William F. Claxton	
Murder by Proxy	March 19, 1954	Terence Fisher	Made in Britain
The House Across the Lake	April 16, 1954	Ken Hughes	Made in Britain
Monster from the Ocean Floor	May 21, 1954	Wyott Ordung	
Five Days	June 25, 1954	Montgomery Tully	Made in Britain
Dangerous Voyage	September 3, 1954	Vernon Sewell	Made in Britain
Silent Raiders	September 17, 1954	Richard Bartlett	
Thunder Pass	September 20, 1954	Frank McDonald	
A Stranger Came Home	September 25, 1954	Terence Fisher	Made in Britain
Third Party Risk	October 8, 1954	Daniel Birt	Made in Britain
Mask of Dust	December 10, 1954	Terence Fisher	Made in Britain
The Black Pirates	December 24, 1954	Allen H. Miner	
They Were So Young	January 7, 1955	Kurt Neumann	
The Glass Cage	February 15, 1955	Montgomery Tully	Made in Britain
The Silver Star	April 8, 1955	Richard Bartlett	
Air Strike	May 5, 1955	Cy Roth	
King Dinosaur	June 17, 1955	Bert I. Gordon	
The Lonesome Trail	July 1, 1955	Richard Bartlett	
Simba	September 9, 1955	Brian Desmond Hurst	Made in Britain
Massacre	June 1, 1956	Louis King	Distributed by 20th Century Fox

== Bibliography ==
- Davis, Blair. The Battle for the Bs: 1950s Hollywood and the Rebirth of Low-Budget Cinema. Rutgers University Press, 2012
- McGee, Mark Thomas. Talk's Cheap, Action's Expensive - the Films of Robert L. Lippert. BearManor Media, 2014.
