= The Vanishing Outpost =

1951 movie

- Original lobby card
- Directed by: Ron Ormond
- Written by: June Carr; Maurice Tombragel
- Produced by: Ron Ormond
- Music by: Walter Greene
- Production company: Western Adventures Productions Inc.
- Distributed by: Realart Pictures; Howco
- Release date: November 1, 1951
- Running time: 56 minutes
- Country: United States
- Language: English

The Vanishing Outpost is a 1951 American Western film produced and directed by Ron Ormond and starring Lash LaRue and Al "Fuzzy" St. John. It is the tenth of LaRue's films for Ormond's Western Adventures Productions Inc., the fourth to be released by Howco and Ormond's second film as director. The screenplay is credited to Ormond's wife June Carr and Maurice Tombragel. The film is composed mostly of footage from the previous Ormond-LaRue Westerns Son of Billy the Kid (1949), Mark of the Lash (1948), Outlaw Country (1949) and Son of a Bad Man (1949). Despite the title, no outposts are involved in the plot.

== Plot ==
Lash and Fuzzy visit a saloon where Lash handles an obnoxious drunk named Mack who has been terrorizing the barflies including Walker, an undercover Pinkerton detective. Recognizing Lash and Fuzzy as marshals, Walker seeks their help in bringing an outlaw gang to justice.

== Production ==
Sue Hussey won her role at the age of 15 after winning the Talladega County Turkey Festival pageant in Alabama, for which LaRue was one of the three judges. Hussey appeared in only one other film, The Thundering Trail, another 1951 Western starring LaRue.

Filming began on November 6, 1950.

To promote the film, LaRue and the entire cast were interviewed on Jimmie Johnson's Memory Lane.

== Cast ==
- Lash La Rue as Marshal Lash LaRue
- Al St. John as Fuzzy Q. Jones
- Riley Hill as Walker
- Sharon Hall as Nancy Walker
- Archie R. Twitchell as Mack
- Clarke Stevens as Denton
- Sue Hussey as Sue
- Cliff Taylor as Bartender
- Bud Osborne as Rufe
- Ray Jones as Barfly
