= John Cason (actor) =

American actor (1918–1961)

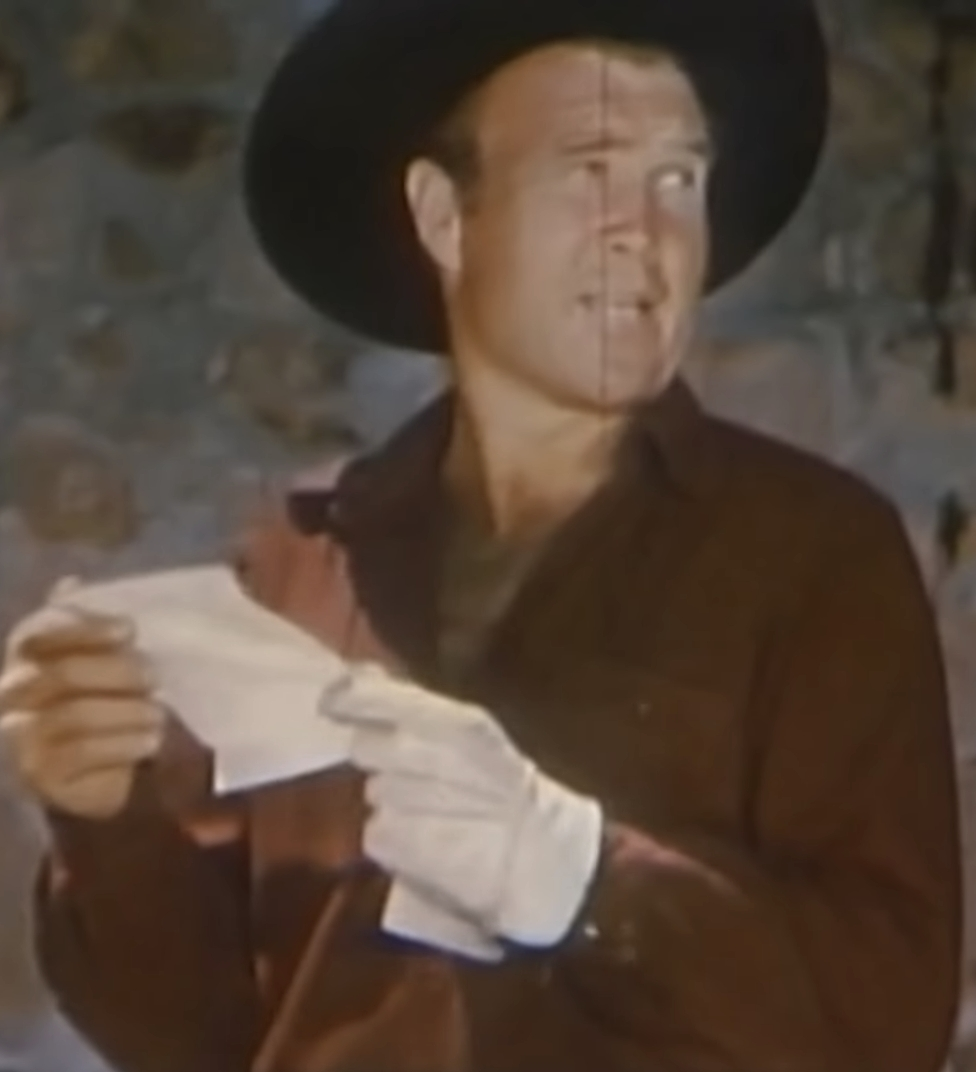
- Cason in Sunset Carson Rides Again (1948)
- Born: John Lacy Cason; July 30, 1918; Valley View, Texas, U.S.
- Died: July 7, 1961 (aged 42); Santa Barbara, California, U.S.
- Resting place: Grangeville Cemetery, Armona, California
- Occupation: Actor
- Years active: 1941–1961

John Lacy Cason (July 30, 1918 – July 7, 1961), also credited as Bob Cason and John L. Cason, was an American actor active in both films and television. During his 20-year career he appeared in over 200 films and television shows. He is best known for his work on the television program The Adventures of Kit Carson, where he appeared in several roles from 1951 to 1953.

== Life and career ==
Cason was born on July 30, 1918, in Valley View, Texas. He made his film debut, as a fighter in the 1941 classic Abbott and Costello comedy, Buck Privates.

Cason was often cast as the bad guy, or henchman during his career, as in 1952's Black Hills Ambush. Most of his roles were un-credited, but he occasionally he received named billing, such as Henchman Lucas in the 1944 Western Wild Horse Phantom, as Blazer in Rimfire (1949), and as Westy in the 1953 Western, Gun Fury. Other notable films in which Cason appears include: Her Husband's Affairs (1947), starring Lucille Ball, Franchot Tone, and Edward Everett Horton; 1949's Tough Assignment, a crime film starring Don Barry; as Corporal Paluso in the classic war melodrama From Here to Eternity, starring Burt Lancaster, Montgomery Clift, and Frank Sinatra; the 1957 comedy, Don't Go Near the Water, starring Glenn Ford and Gia Scala; and as one of Glenn Ford's henchmen in the classic Western 3:10 to Yuma, which also stars Van Heflin;

Cason appeared in several film serials, including the featured role of Hopper in 1953's The Lost Planet, the recurring role of Casey in Desperadoes of the West (1950) starring Tom Keene, and as Smoky in 1952's Son of Geronimo: Apache Avenger starring Clayton Moore. His final film performance was in the role of Suggs in yet another Glenn Ford Western, 1960's Cimarron, which also stars Maria Schell.

With the advent of television, Cason began appearing in television series. His first appearance on the small screen was in 1949, in the first season of the series The Lone Ranger, appearing as a henchman. Other television series he appeared on include: Hopalong Cassidy (1952), several different roles from 1951 to 1953 on The Adventures of Kit Carson, several appearances on The Roy Rogers Show from 1953 to 1957, in different roles on several episodes of Judge Roy Bean in 1956, as several different guest roles on The Life and Legend of Wyatt Earp from 1956 to 1959, on both Maverick and Rawhide in 1960, and on The Untouchables and Bat Masterson in 1961. His final performance was on the 1961 episode of Lawman, "By the Book", in which he played the character Brad Oliver, which aired after his death in December 1961.

== Death ==
Cason died at Cottage Hospital in Santa Barbara, California on July 7, 1961 due to a single car traffic accident that occurred in Buellton, California. He was buried in Grangeville Cemetery, in Armona, California.

== Selected filmography ==
- Buck Privates (1941) - Fighter (uncredited)
- Fugitive Valley (1941) - Whip Rider (uncredited)
- Badlands of Dakota (1941) - Townsman (uncredited)
- The Apache Kid (1941) - Deputy Tom (uncredited)
- You'll Never Get Rich (1941) - Soldier (uncredited)
- Death Valley Outlaws (1941) - Vigilante (uncredited)
- Down Mexico Way (1941) - Henchman (uncredited)
- Go West, Young Lady (1941) - Barfly (uncredited)
- Riders of the Badlands (1941) - Prison Guard (uncredited)
- The Lone Star Vigilantes (1942) - Henchman Soldier (uncredited)
- Valley of the Sun (1942) - Officer at Court Martial (uncredited)
- Raiders of the West (1942) - Gene - First Auction Wiseguy (uncredited)
- Raiders of the Range (1942) - Posse Rider (uncredited)
- Down Rio Grande Way (1942) - Red (uncredited)
- Westward Ho (1942) - Henchman (uncredited)
- Rio Rita (1942) - Ranger (uncredited)
- Bad Men of the Hills (1942) - Henchman (uncredited)
- Shadows on the Sage (1942) - Cowhand (uncredited)
- The Valley of Vanishing Men (1942, Serial) - Miner (uncredited)
- Lost Canyon (1942) - Henchman (uncredited)
- Border Patrol (1943) - Miner (uncredited)
- Taxi, Mister (1943) - Ballplayer in Donnybrook (uncredited)
- Murder on the Waterfront (1943) - Sailor Greeting Bus (uncredited)
- The Vigilantes Ride (1943) - Henchman (uncredited)
- Frontier Outlaws (1944) - Rancher (uncredited)
- Follow the Boys (1944) - Soldier Listening to Radio (uncredited)
- Valley of Vengeance (1944) - Henchman (uncredited)
- The Contender (1944) - The Koko Kid (uncredited)
- Spook Town (1944) - Henchman Breed (uncredited)
- Sonora Stagecoach (1944) - Gunman #3 (uncredited)
- Fuzzy Settles Down (1944) - Red Rock Townsman (uncredited)
- The Hairy Ape (1944) - Bar Patron-Brawler (uncredited)
- Mr. Winkle Goes to War (1944) - Soldier at USO Dance (uncredited)
- Raiders of Ghost City (1944, Serial) - Barfly (uncredited)
- Marked Trails (1944) - Chuck - Henchman (uncredited)
- Brand of the Devil (1944) - Deputy / Henchman Ed (uncredited)
- Land of the Outlaws (1944) - Lefty - Henchman (uncredited)
- Wild Horse Phantom (1944) - Lucas - Henchman
- Zorro's Black Whip (1944, Serial) - Henchman (uncredited)
- Ghost Guns (1944) - Bart - Henchman
- Harmony Trail (1944) - Townsman (uncredited)
- Oath of Vengeance (1944) - Bart - Wounded Henchman (uncredited)
- His Brother's Ghost (1945) - Henchman Jarrett
- Gun Smoke (1945) - Red - Henchman
- Shadows of Death (1945) - Henchman Butch
- Counter-Attack (1945) - Paratrooper (uncredited)
- Both Barrels Blazing (1945) - Henhcman Shad (uncredited)
- Gangster's Den (1945) - Burke (uncredited)
- Flame of the West (1945) - Slim (uncredited)
- Stagecoach Outlaws (1945) - Joe - Henchman
- Rustlers' Hideout (1945) - Charley Green (uncredited)
- Border Badmen (1945) - Henchman (uncredited)
- Flaming Bullets (1945) - Henchman Jim (uncredited)
- Fighting Bill Carson (1945) - Henchman Joe
- Prairie Rustlers (1945) - Gus (uncredited)
- The Fighting Guardsman (1946) - Baptiste (uncredited)
- Lightning Raiders (1946) - Henchman Gordon (uncredited)
- Ambush Trail (1946) - Ed Blaine - Henchman
- Larceny in Her Heart (1946) - Club Bouncer (uncredited)
- Ghost of Hidden Valley (1946) - Henchman Buck
- Prairie Badmen (1946) - Steve
- Overland Riders (1946) - Henchman
- Outlaws of the Plains (1946) - Joe Dayton (uncredited)
- South of the Chisholm Trail (1947) - Fight Spectator (uncredited)
- Over the Santa Fe Trail (1947) - Henchman (uncredited)
- The Lone Hand Texan (1947) - Henchman (uncredited)
- Prairie Raiders (1947) - Cinco - Henchman (uncredited)
- The Last Round-Up (1947) - Henchman Carter (uncredited)
- Her Husband's Affairs (1947) - Heckler (uncredited)
- Six-Gun Law (1948) - Ben - Henchman (uncredited)
- The Wreck of the Hesperus (1948) - Thug (uncredited)
- Relentless (1948) - Deputy Posse Member (uncredited)
- The Gallant Legion (1948) - Sprauge (uncredited)
- Trail to Laredo (1948) - Blaze - Henchman (uncredited)
- Sunset Carson Rides Again (1948) - Sam Webster
- Dead Man's Gold (1948) - Henchman Matt Conway
- Mark of the Lash (1948) - Hechnman Colt Jackson
- Belle Starr's Daughter (1948) - Kiowa Posseman
- The Big Sombrero (1949) - Henchman Stacy (uncredited)
- Challenge of the Range (1949) - Henchman Henley (uncredited)
- Rimfire (1949) - Blazer
- Laramie (1949) - Henchman (uncredited)
- The Blazing Trail (1949) - Patterson Henchman (uncredited)
- Ringside (1949) - Tiger Johnson
- Feudin' Rhythm (1949) - Pete (uncredited)
- Tough Assignment (1949) - Joe
- Red Desert (1949) - Bob Horn - Henchman
- Range Land (1949) - Rocky Rand - Henchman
- The Traveling Saleswoman (1950) - Fred
- Hostile Country (1950) - Ed Brady
- Comanche Territory (1950) - Newcomer at Shindig (uncredited)
- Marshal of Heldorado (1950) - Jake Tulliver
- Crooked River (1950) - Kent
- Colorado Ranger (1950) - Loco Joe
- West of the Brazos (1950) - The Cyclone Kid
- Fast on the Draw (1950) - Tex
- Punchy Cowpunchers (1950) - Black Jack Dillon (uncredited)
- Desperadoes of the West (1950, Serial) - Casey [Chs. 1, 8, 11, 12]
- Streets of Ghost Town (1950) - John Wicks (uncredited)
- Redwood Forest Trail (1950) - Henchman Curley
- Wyoming Mail (1950) - Red Monte (uncredited)
- Rustlers on Horseback (1950) - Henchman Murray
- Stage to Tucson (1950) - Henchman (uncredited)
- Prairie Roundup (1951) - Barton (uncredited)
- Fort Savage Raiders (1951) - Henchman Gus
- Wanted: Dead or Alive (1951) - Henchman (uncredited)
- Don Daredevil Rides Again (1951, Serial) - Hagen
- The Texas Rangers (1951) - Guard on Train (uncredited)
- The Thundering Trail (1951) - Conway - Henchman
- Westward the Women (1951) - Margaret's Awaiting Groom (uncredited)
- The Black Lash (1952) - Henchman Cord
- The Hawk of Wild River (1952) - Duke - Henchman (uncredited)
- High Noon (1952) - Barfly (uncredited)
- Black Hills Ambush (1952) - Henchman Jake
- The Kid from Broken Gun (1952) - Chuck (uncredited)
- Hellgate (1952) - Guard (uncredited)
- Wagon Team (1952) - Henchman Slim
- Son of Geronimo (1952, Serial) - Smoky (ch's 10–12) (uncredited)
- Voodoo Tiger (1952) - Jerry Masters (uncredited)
- Jungle Drums of Africa (1953, Serial) - Regas
- Savage Frontier (1953) - Buck Matson - Henchman
- The Lost Planet (1953) - Hopper
- From Here to Eternity (1953) - Cpl. Paluso (uncredited)
- Gun Fury (1953) - Westy (uncredited)
- Thunder Over the Plains (1953) - Kehoe - Henchman (uncredited)
- Red River Shore (1953) - Joe - Henchman
- The Boy from Oklahoma (1954) - Henchman (uncredited)
- Saskatchewan (1954) - Cook (uncredited)
- The Law vs. Billy the Kid (1954) - Nate - Posse Member (uncredited)
- Cattle Queen of Montana (1954) - Henchman (uncredited)
- Treasure of Ruby Hills (1955) - Payne Henchman (uncredited)
- Wyoming Renegades (1955) - O.C. Hanks
- King of the Carnival (1955, Serial) - Henchman (uncredited)
- Tennessee's Partner (1955) - Townsman (uncredited)
- Count Three and Pray (1955) - Charlie Vancouver (uncredited)
- The Last Frontier (1955) - First Sentry (uncredited)
- A Lawless Street (1955) - Dean Ranch Hand (uncredited)
- Top Gun (1955) - Ben (uncredited)
- Jubal (1956) - Ranch Owner (uncredited)
- Blackjack Ketchum, Desperado (1956) - Spade - Henchman (uncredited)
- Over-Exposed (1956) - Studio Thug (uncredited)
- He Laughed Last (1956) - Big Dan's Hood (uncredited)
- Naked Gun (1956) - (scenes deleted)
- The Storm Rider (1957) - Jasper (uncredited)
- The Phantom Stagecoach (1957) - Henry Fox (uncredited)
- The Iron Sheriff (1957) - Irate Townsman at Trial (uncredited)
- Snowfire (1957) - Buff Stoner
- 3:10 to Yuma (1957) - Wade Henchman (uncredited)
- Don't Go Near the Water (1957) - Seabee Metkoff (uncredited)
- The Hard Man (1957) - Henchman with Eye Patch (uncredited)
- Cowboy (1958) - Trail Hand (uncredited)
- Screaming Mimi (1958) - Herb (uncredited)
- Gunman's Walk (1958) - Wrangler (uncredited)
- The Restless Gun (1958) in Episode "The Manhunters"
- Gunmen from Laredo (1959) - Bob Sutton (uncredited)
- Cimarron (1960) - Suggs (uncredited)
