= Ron Ormond =

American filmmaker and showman (1910–1981)

- Ron Ormond
- Born: Victor Narro; August 29, 1910; Baldwin, Louisiana, US
- Died: May 11, 1981 (aged 70); Nashville, Tennessee, US
- Other name: Vic Narro
- Occupations: Actor; author; film director; film producer; screenwriter; showman
- Years active: 1935–1981
- Spouse: June Carr (m. 1935–1981)
- Children: Tim Ormond, Victor Ormond

Ron Ormond (August 29, 1910 – May 11, 1981) was an American actor, author, film director, film producer, screenwriter, and showman known for producing and directing Western, musical, and exploitation horror films.

Ormond began his career as a stage magician and vaudeville performer. After settling in southern California, he collaborated with Lash LaRue on a series of B-Westerns. He later began writing, directing, and producing exploitation films such as Untamed Mistress (1956), which were popular in the grindhouse and drive-in style of the era. In 1965, Ormond moved to Nashville and produced country music films featuring stars from the Grand Ole Opry.

Following his survival of a 1968 plane crash, Ormond embraced Christianity and began making Christian films. He collaborated with Estus Pirkle on If Footmen Tire You, What Will Horses Do? (1971), The Burning Hell (1974), and The Grim Reaper (1976). Often labeled as "Christploitation", Ormond's films of this era retained his grindhouse style, with graphic depictions of damnation in an evangelistic attempt to reach church audiences.

Ormond's efforts included family collaboration, and much of his work included his wife Judy and son Tim.

== Early life ==
Ron Ormond was born Victor Narro. He was of Italian descent, with his birth name sometimes given as Vittorio di Naro. He took his surname from his friend, magician and hypnotist Ormond McGill.

In 1935, Ormond, who had been performing a magic act under the name "Rahn Ormond" was booked as an act at the Capitol Theater. Also performing at the venue was vaudvillian June Carr (1912–2006). When June say Ormond, she determined that she would marry him. They were married three weeks later.

June Ormond's father actor, former nightclub owner and burlesque comic Cliff Taylor, also appeared in many of the Ormond's films. June's parents had been vaudeville performers, and after retiring from the road, opened a nightclub in the basement of the Mayfair Theater called "Coffee Cliff's".

In 1950, June Ormond gave birth to their only son, Tim. Tim acted in several of their films.

== Early career ==
Ron and June began packaging variety shows and touring with them, especially in the Southern states. In between tours, they spent time with family in Southern California. The Ormonds eventually settled in Hollywood, living across the street from Roy Rogers. According to Judy Carr, Lash LaRue showed up at their house one evening and asked Ormond to write a touring show for him.

Ormond formed Western Adventure Productions, Inc. in 1948 to write, produce and eventually direct Lash LaRue's films. The films were shot on a short schedule, typically five days, with minimal sets and cast. They were originally distributed by Screen Guild. Ormond's first credit was 1948's Dead Man's Gold. Ormond made his directing debut in King of the Bullwhip with La Rue in 1950. Son of a Bad Man (1949) was the last Screen Guild release. After parting ways with Screen Guild, Western Adventure Productions went to Realart Pictures Inc. for distribution.

In 1950, Ormond partnered with Robert L. Lippert to produce a series of Westerns starring former Hopalong Cassidy sidekicks James Ellison and Russell Hayden. The idea was to film all six films at the same time, using the same actors, wearing the same costumes. The entire series was shot in 21 days.

Western Adventure acquired reissue rights to a number of Hal Roach's Laurel and Hardy comedies, and distributed them along with its own productions.

Ormond prospered when Lippert released several of his productions to theaters. These economically made features were generally musical comedies, often in revue format, featuring vaudeville, nightclub, and minstrel acts. Titles like Square Dance Jubilee (1949), Hollywood Varieties (1950), and Varieties on Parade (1951), were welcomed by theater owners, especially in rural areas and smaller towns.

Western Adventure Productions ceased operating in 1951 after completing eight films, but four more films were made into 1952 using large amounts of footage from the previous films with various names credited for the screenplays such as Ormond's young son Tim and associate producer Ira Webb.

== Howco era ==
As the economics of producing B picture Westerns changed in the era of television, Ormond formed a company named Howco. The name was derived from the initials of Ormond, and his collaborators, drive-in movie owners Joy Houck and J. Francis White. Howco's initial plan was to get into television. They began with a short, fifteen-minute series called Lash of the West, which was cut from old Lash LaRue pictures. The series was initially launched in syndication, and then sold to ABC, for Saturday morning filler.

Ormond recognized the days of the B-Western were being taken over by television, and he was looking for new opportunities. Through Howco, he produced a television pilot for a jungle series with Sabu Dastigar. Houck and White backed the Ormond directed pilot, most of which was shot in a rented studio. Before the pilot could sell, Sabu disappeared, having been suspected of arson in an insurance scam, and the project was shelved.

Howco had an ambitious beginning, producing a moderately expensive Western filmed in Cinecolor with familiar Hollywood players, Outlaw Women (1952). Ormond and his partners soon targeted the teenage drive-in audience with quickie exploitation features, such as Mesa of Lost Women.

Ormond eventually returned to the unused footage from the Sabu pilot. Irritated by the waste of invested funds, he decided to rework the footage into a full length feature film. He cast Jacqueline Fontaine, Allan Nixon, and June Ormond's father, Cliff Taylor, for new scenes which were shot outdoors, on location. Ormond was also able to license 16mm footage of African safari from Mickey Rooney's doctor. During this time, Sabu had returned to the United States, and hearing of the project, he asked for significantly more money. Unwilling to work with Sabu, Ormond re-edited the film to remove all of Sabu's footage, filling in with additional scenes with the new actors as well as more African safari footage. The resulting film was Untamed Mistress.

Additional Howco productions included Please Don't Touch Me (also known as Teenage Bride) and country-music movies such as 1965's 40 Acre Feud, featuring country-music stars George Jones, Bill Anderson and Skeeter Davis, and 1967's White Lightnin' Road, a racetrack melodrama starring country singer and frequent Ormond actor Earl "Snake" Richards.

In the 1950s, Ormond directed an unsold television pilot of Gulliver's Travels starring Allan Nixon. The series was a Howco production with the working title The Little People. Richard Carr wrote the script.

In 1959, Ormond was successfully treated for bladder cancer, after which he spent eight months with Ormond McGill in Asia writing the book Into the Strange Unknown. In 1976, they revised and expanded the material and published it as Religious Mysteries of the Orient. The books discussed their travels in the Philippines and eastern countries and included discussion of what they called "fourth dimensional operations", referring to psychic surgery. Other works by Ron Ormond include a home study course titled The Master Method of Hypnosis and the book The Art of Meditation: The Oriental Method Of Entering The Kingdom Of Heaven While Still Living In The Human Body.

== Nashville ==
In 1965, Ormond, his wife, and their son Tim, moved from Hollywood to Nashville. At the time, he had a reputation as "king of the B-movies", and upon arriving in Nashville, the Ormonds began looking for investors for country music films. The first film made was 1966's The Girl from Tobacco Row. Ormond used stars from the Grand Ole Opry like Tex Ritter and Minnie Pearl. The Girl from Tobacco Row featured country music acts like Fiddlin' Arthur Smith and the Dixieliners, the Haywood Mountaineers, and the Skylarks. During this period, Ormond also produced Forty Acre Feud, which was a Calhouns vs the Culpeppers showdown featuring Ferlin Husky, Minnie Pearl, Ray Price, George Jones, Loretta Lynn, Roy Drusky, Skeeter Davis, Bill Anderson, and other country singers. By 1966, the Hillbilly Hollywood fad was oversaturated, and the Ormonds continued to produce exploitation films such as White Lightnin' Road and 1968's The Exotic Ones, which was also released under the title The Monster and the Stripper.

In the mid-1960s, Ormond produced roller derby on television for Leo Seltzer. At the time, roller derby was big business, at least for Leo Seltzer, a San Fernando Valley businessman. Ormond managed the derby, which held weekly skate-offs at the Olympic auditorium in downtown Los Angeles. Ormond ended up leaving the Derby after telling Seltzer, "I can't work for you and still remain your friend, and I consider you a good friend."

== Christian films ==
Ormond began making films about Christianity in the 1970s. He had crashed his single-engine airplane into a field near Nashville in 1966 while en route to a screening of The Girl from Tobacco Row, and he seems to have emerged from the accident—he spent months recovering from serious injuries—a Christian. Made with Mississippi evangelist Estus Pirkle, If Footmen Tire You, What Will Horses Do?, The Burning Hell and The Believer's Heaven address the second coming of Jesus Christ, communism and American conformism, with Pirkle's preaching the basis of the films. In a 2007 interview, Ormond associate Tim Green said that Pirkle kept track of the number of conversions generated by the film, which at last count was 6 million. The Burning Hell cost $60,000 to produce and yielded a profit of $2 million. Ormond and Pirkle eventually parted ways after three films, reportedly over money.

Following his collaborations with Pirkle, Ormond continued to make Christian exploitation films. In 1976, he collaborated on The Grim Reaper. John R. Rice had been looking for opportunities that would help promote Jerry Falwell as his successor. Rice, who lived near Ormond in Nashville, contacted Ormond to produce the film to feature Falwell and Jack Van Impe which they filmed on location in Murfreesboro, Tennessee. The Grim Reaper was part of a 1970s genre of horror films that became known as "Christploitation" films.

In 1979 he directed 39 Stripes, the tale of a former chain-gang member who converts to Christianity. He also directed Surrender at Navajo Canyon for Pete Rice, and a travelogue for John Rice entitled The Land Where Jesus Walked. The Second Coming was next on the agenda, but Ormond died of cancer before production. A shortened one hour version was eventually directed by his son Tim Ormond who also scripted, and produced by him and June Ormond. The film is dedicated to the memory of Ron Ormond and John Rice.

== Legacy ==
Biographer Jimmy McDonough published an exhaustive biography of the Ormond family titled The Exotic Ones: That Fabulous Film-Making Family from Music City, U.S.A. – The Ormonds in May 2023. It was produced by film director Nicolas Winding Refn. From Hollywood to Heaven: The Lost and Saved Films of the Ormond Family, a Blu-ray set of all the Ormond exploitation and religious titles, was released in conjunction with the book.

RiffTrax, consisting of former Mystery Science Theater 3000 alumni Kevin Murphy, Bill Corbett and Michael J. Nelson, spoofed Mesa of Lost Women on April 2, 2012.

== Filmography ==
Year	Title	Director	Writer	Producer	Ref(s)
1948	Dead Man's Gold	No	No	Yes	
1948	Frontier Revenge	No	No	Yes	
1948	Mark of the Lash	No	Yes	Yes	
1949	Ringside	No	Yes	Yes	
1949	Outlaw Country	No	Yes	Yes	
1949	Texas Manhunt	No	Yes	Yes	
1949	Rimfire	No	Yes	Yes	
1949	Son of a Bad Man	No	Yes	Yes	
1949	Son of Billy the Kid	No	Yes	Yes	
1949	Square Dance Jubilee	No	Yes	Yes	
1949	The Dalton Gang	No	No	Yes	
1950	Hollywood Varieties				
1950	Colorado Ranger	No	Yes	Yes	
1950	Crooked River	No	Yes	No	
1950	The Daltons' Women	No	Yes	Yes	
1950	Fast on the Draw	No	Yes	Yes	
1950	Hostile Country	No	Yes	Yes	
1950	Marshal of Heldorado	No	Yes	Yes	
1950	West of the Brazos	No	Yes	Yes	
1951	King of the Bullwhip	Yes	No	Yes	
1951	The Thundering Trail	Yes	No	Yes	
1951	The Vanishing Outpost	Yes	No	Yes	
1951	Yes Sir, Mr. Bones	Yes	Yes	Yes	
1952	The Black Lash	Yes	No	No	
1952	The Frontier Phantom	Yes	No	Yes	
1952	Outlaw Women	No	No	Yes	
1953	Mesa of Lost Women	Yes	No	No	
1955	Frontier Woman	Yes	No	No	
1956	Naked Gun	No	Yes	Yes	
1957	Untamed Mistress	Yes	Yes	Yes	
1959	Please Don't Touch Me	Yes	Yes	Yes	
1965	White Lightin' Road				
1965	40 Acre Feud	Yes	No	No	
1966	The Girl from Tobacco Row	Yes	Yes	Yes	
1968	The Exotic Ones (also titled The Monster and the Stripper)	Yes	Yes	Yes	
1971	If Footmen Tire You, What Will Horses Do?	Yes	Yes	No	
1974	The Burning Hell	Yes	Yes	Yes	
1976	The Land Where Jesus Walked			Yes	
1976	The Grim Reaper	Yes	Yes	No	
1977	The Believer's Heaven				
1979	39 Stripes				
1984	The Second Coming			Yes	

== Bibliography ==
- Albright, Brian (2012). Regional Horror Films, 1958-1990: A State-by-State Guide with Interviews. Jefferson, North Carolina: McFarland & Company. ISBN 978-1-4766-0042-0.
- Andreychuk, Ed (2024). American Frontiersmen on Film and Television: Boone, Crockett, Bowie, Houston, Bridger and Carson. Jefferson, North Carolina: McFarland & Company. ISBN 978-1-4766-0650-7.
- Ang, Armando (2004). The Plain Truth about the Unorthodox Protestants. A1 Pub. ISBN 978-971-92659-2-4.
- Beck, Ken (July 16, 2006). "June Ormond dies, Filmmaker was 94". The Tennessean. pp. B2.
- Boggs, Johnny D. (2013). Billy the Kid on Film, 1911-2012. Jefferson, North Carolina: McFarland & Company. ISBN 978-0-7864-6555-2.
- Broomer, Stephen (December 6, 2024). "Prophets and Propaganda, or, If Faces Tire You, What Will Movies Do?". Art & Trash.
- Corti, Roberto (2009). Demoni e dei: Dio, il diavolo, la religione nel cinema horror americano. ISBN 978-8-871807-95-9.
- Davies, Clive (2015). Spinegrinder: The Movies Most Critics Won’t Write About. SCB Distributors. ISBN 978-1-909394-06-3.
- Davis, Chris (October 26, 2015). "The Ghastly Vision of Filmmaker Ron Ormond". Memphis Magazine.
- Doviak, Scott Von (2015). Hick Flicks: The Rise and Fall of Redneck Cinema. McFarland. ISBN 978-0-7864-8212-2.
- Drew, Bernard A. (2013). Motion Picture Series and Sequels: A Reference Guide. London: Routledge. ISBN 978-1-317-92893-5.
- Duncan, David D.; Ridley, Jim (April 18, 1996). "It Came From Nashville!". Nashville Scene.
- Fagen, Herb (2003). The Encyclopedia of Westerns. New York: Facts on File, Inc. ISBN 0-8160-4456-2.
- Gibson, Nathan D.; Pierce, Don (2011). The Starday Story: The House That Country Music Built. University Press of Mississippi. ISBN 978-1-60473-830-8.
- Himes, Andrew (2011). The Sword of the Lord: The Roots of Fundamentalism in an American Family. Seattle, Washington: Chiara Press. ISBN 978-1-4538-4375-8.
- Katchmer, George A. (1991). Eighty Silent Film Stars: Biographies and Filmographies of the Obscure to the Well Known. Jefferson, North Carolina: McFarland & Company. ISBN 978-0-89950-494-0.
- Lentz, Harris M. (2001). Science Fiction, Horror & Fantasy Film and Television Credits. Vol. 2 (2nd ed.). Jefferson, North Carolina: McFarland & Company. ISBN 0-7864-0951-7.
- Lewis, C. Jack (2002). White Horse, Black Hat: A Quarter Century on Hollywood's Poverty Row. Rowman & Littlefield – via Google Books.
- Lindvall, Terry; Quicke, Andrew (2011). Celluloid Sermons: The Emergence of the Christian Film Industry, 1930-1986. NYU Press. ISBN 978-0-8147-5324-8.
- McDonough, Jimmy (1987). "Great Balls of Fire". Film Comment. 23 (2): 38–50.
- McGill, Ormond (2005). The Amazing Life of Ormond McGill. Crown House Publishing. ISBN 978-1-84590-480-7.
- Miller, Don (1993). Don Miller's Hollywood Corral: A Comprehensive B-Western Roundup. Riverwood Press. ISBN 978-1-880756-03-4.
- Okuda, Ted (1989). Grand National, Producers Releasing Corporation, and Screen Guild/Lippert: Complete Filmographies with Studio Histories. Jefferson, North Carolina: McFarland & Company. ISBN 978-0-89950-384-4.
- Pitts, Michael R. (1997). Western Movies: A TV and Video Guide to 4200 Genre Films. Jefferson, North Carolina: McFarland & Company. ISBN 978-0-7864-0421-6.
- Pitts, Michael R. (2009). Western Film Series of the Sound Era. Jefferson, North Carolina: McFarland & Company. ISBN 978-0-7864-3529-6.
- Ridley, Jim (2010). "Christian Scare Films: The Unlikely Pairing of Director Ron Ormond and Preacher Estus Pirkle". In Weiner, Robert G.; Cline, John (eds.). Cinema Inferno: Celluloid Explosions from the Cultural Margins. Lanham, Maryland: The Scarecrow Press, Inc. ISBN 978-0-8108-7656-9.
- Schaefer, Eric (1999). "Bold! Daring! Shocking! True!": A History of Exploitation Films, 1919-1959. Duke University Press. ISBN 978-0-8223-2374-7.
- Tosches, Nick (August 1, 2009). Where Dead Voices Gather. Hachette+ORM. ISBN 978-0-316-07714-9.
- Wagner, Laura (2025). Hollywood Boozers, Brawlers and Hard-Luck Cases: Fifteen Ill-Fated Actors of the Golden Age. Jefferson, North Carolina: McFarland & Company. ISBN 978-1-4766-5406-5.
- Weldon, Michael (1996). The Psychotronic Video Guide To Film. Macmillan. ISBN 978-0-312-13149-4.
