= King of the Bullwhip =

1950 movie

- Original lobby card
- Directed by: Ron Ormond
- Written by: Jack Lewis; Ira S. Webb
- Produced by: Ron Ormond
- Music by: Walter Greene
- Production company: Western Adventures Productions Inc.
- Distributed by: Realart Pictures; Howco
- Release date: December 20, 1950
- Running time: 58 minutes
- Country: United States
- Language: English
- Budget: $40,000

King of the Bullwhip is a 1950 American Western film produced and directed by Ron Ormond and starring Lash LaRue and Al "Fuzzy" St. John. The screenplay was cowritten by Jack Lewis and associate producer Ira S. Webb. The film was shot at the Iverson Movie Ranch.

== Plot ==
Marshal Lash La Rue and deputy marshal Fuzzy Jones are sent to stop a gang led by bullwhip-wielding masked bandit El Azote, who is terrorizing the area with murder and armed robbery. Ambushed by a group of seven riders, Lash and Fuzzy evade them and travel to Tioga City. Upon arrival, Lash notices that the local newspaper has informed the town of the arrival of a marshal and deputy. This leads Lash to believe that someone at the newspaper published the information arrival in order to kill them.

After a fight in a saloon in which Lash uses his whip on a thug, he meets Benson, the owner of the saloon. Lash informs Benson that they were waylaid by a gang of men and that they saw the bodies of a marshal and his deputy whom they had buried. Benson notices Lash's prowess with a bullwhip in the fight and schemes to dress Lash as El Azote to reap a profit and cast the blame on El Azote.

Eventually Lash's and Fuzzy's true identities as lawmen are discovered. They are captured, disarmed and bound. Escaping their bonds by using their spurs, Lash and Fuzzy bring El Azote and his outlaw gang to justice; Lash uses his whip and Fuzzy uses his slingshot. Lash and El Azote have a bullwhip fight to the finish while Fuzzy meets Buffalo Bill Cody.

== Cast ==
- Lash La Rue as Marshal Lash La Rue
- Al St. John as Deputy Fuzzy Q. Jones
- Jack Holt as James Kerrigan
- Tom Neal as Benson
- Dennis Moore as Joe Chester
- Anne Gwynne as Jane Kerrigan
- George J. Lewis as Rio
- Michael Whalen as Thurman
- Mary Lou Webb as Mary Lou
- Willis Houck as Willis
- Cliff Taylor as Mr. Palmer
- Frank Jaquet as Joe the Bartender
- Tex Cooper as Buffalo Bill

== Production ==
The film was shot in five days for $40,000, with the climactic bullwhip duel filmed in one afternoon. The film includes several sequences of action and chase footage from previous Ormond Larue films.

Ormond's father-in-law Cliff Taylor, Joy Houck's son Willis and Ira Webb's daughter Mary Lou all appear in the film.

Buffalo Bill is portrayed by Tex Cooper (1876-1951) who had known knew Buffalo Bill, had performed in wild-west shows at the World's Columbian Exposition and the 101 Ranch Wild West Show and was an actual Sherman, Texas sheriff.

== Release ==
The film released in theaters on December 20, 1950 in the United States.

== Reception ==
Writing in AllMovie, critic Hal Erickson described the film as having "decent production values and an above-average cast," adding that "Likewise praiseworthy is the plot, a solid mystery yarn concerning an unknown bank robber."
