= The Thundering Trail =

1951 movie

- Original lobby card
- Directed by: Ron Ormond
- Written by: June Carr; Ira S. Webb
- Produced by: Ron Ormond
- Music by: Walter Greene
- Production company: Western Adventures Productions Inc.
- Distributed by: Realart Pictures; Howco
- Release date: July 2, 1951
- Running time: 55 minutes
- Country: United States
- Language: English
- Budget: $40,000

The Thundering Trail is a 1951 American Western film produced and directed by Ron Ormond and starring Lash LaRue and Al "Fuzzy" St. John. It was the ninth of LaRue's films for Ormond's Western Adventures Productions and the third to be released by Howco, a distribution company owned by Ormond and drive-in theater owners Joy N. Houck and J. Francis White. The screenplay was cowritten by Ormond's wife June Carr and associate producer Ira S. Webb. The film features a large amount of footage from previous Ormond/LaRue Westerns.

== Plot ==
The president of the United States appoints judge Tom Emery, who was under the president's command in the American Civil War, to become the new territorial governor and address the outlaw problem. Marshal Lash and Deputy Fuzzy escort the judge and his daughter to Capitol City, but a large gang of outlaws with unsuspected informers attempts to stop them.

== Cast ==
- Lash La Rue as Marshal Lash LaRue
- Al St. John as Fuzzy Q. Jones
- Archie R. Twitchell as Gov. Tom Emery
- Sally Anglim as Betty Jo Emery
- Ray Bennett as Ed West
- Sue Hussey as Sue
- Mary Lou Webb as Miss Smith
- Clarke Stevens as Clark
- John L. Cason as Conway
- Jimmy Martin as Frank
- George Chesebro as Charlie Jones
- Bud Osborne as Joe
- Terry Frost as Schaeffer
- Reed Howes as Schaeffer's Brother

== Production ==
Sue Hussey won her role at the age of 15 after winning the Talladega County Turkey Festival pageant in Alabama, for which LaRue was one of the three judges. Hussey appeared in only one other film, The Vanishing Outpost, another 1951 Western starring LaRue.
