= Lash of the West =

- Starring: Lash LaRue
- Country of origin: United States
- Original language: English
- No. of seasons: 1

Production
- Running time: 15 minutes

Original release
- Network: ABC
- Release: January 4 – April 26, 1953

Lash of the West is an American Western television series that aired on ABC on Sunday night at 6:30 p.m Eastern time from January 4, 1953, to April 26, 1953. The series was essentially put together using clips from Lash LaRue's B-grade Western movies from the 1940s. This series was initially offered for syndication in 1952, before being picked up by ABC. In the summer of 1953, ABC moved the program to 10:15-10:30 a.m. on Saturdays.

== Synopsis ==
1940s western movie star Lash LaRue appeared at the opening of each episode in a modern-day marshal's office and would then tell a story about his grandfather, who looked just like him, was also a marshal, and also named Lash LaRue. Cliff Taylor, as Flapjack helped to present the episodes. The scene then shifted to clips of LaRue's old movies in which LaRue's "granddad" went after bad guys with his sidekick Fuzzy Q. Jones.

== Production and distribution ==
The program was produced by Ron Ormond and distributed nationally by Guild Films, Incorporated.

In 1954, 39 episodes of Lash of the West were sold to TV stations in Los Angeles; Memphis, Tennessee; Tulsa, Oklahoma; and Stockton, California.

== Cast ==
- Lash LaRue as Lash LaRue
- Al St. John as Fuzzy Q. Jones
- Cliff Taylor as Flapjack
- Taylor Strattan as John Martin
