= The Frontier Phantom =

1952 movie

- Film poster
- Directed by: Ron Ormond
- Written by: June Carr; Maurice Tombragel
- Produced by: Ron Ormond
- Music by: Walter Greene
- Production company: Western Adventures Productions Inc.
- Distributed by: Realart Pictures Inc.
- Release date: February 1, 1952
- Running time: 55 minutes
- Country: United States
- Language: English

The Frontier Phantom is a 1952 American Western film produced and directed by Ron Ormond starring Lash LaRue in the final film of Ormond's Western Adventure Productions, Inc. It is also the final film of Al St. John. Most of the film consists of footage from the 1949 film Outlaw Country.

== Plot ==
Four days after Lash and Fuzzy have foiled a counterfeit gang, Lash is mistaken for his twin brother the Frontier Phantom and arrested. At the jail, Lash relates how the gang was defeated and describes his showdown with Sam Mantell.

== Cast ==
- Lash La Rue as Marshal Lash La Rue
- Al St. John as Deputy Fuzzy Q. Jones
- Archie Twitchell as Sheriff
- Virginia Herrick as Susan
- Kenne Duncan as Sam Mantell
- Sandy Sanders as Mantell Henchman
- Clarke Stevens as Deputy Lee
- Cliff Taylor as Sparky the Telegrapher
- Bud Osborne as Deputy Matt
- Buck Garrett as Mantell henchman
- Jack O'Shea as Prisoner
- George Chesebro as Cy the Bartender/Mayor

== Bibliography ==
- Hoffmann, Henryk (October 9, 2012). Western Movie References in American Literature. McFarland. p. 65. ISBN 978-0-7864-9324-1.
- Holland, Ted (November 1, 1997). B Western Actors Encyclopedia: Facts, Photos and Filmographies for More than 250 Familiar Faces. McFarland. p. 279. ISBN 978-1-4766-0869-3.
- Pitts, Michael R. (January 4, 2013). Western Movies: A Guide to 5,105 Feature Films, 2d ed. McFarland. p. 118. ISBN 978-0-7864-6372-5.
