= Archie Twitchell =

American actor (1906–1957)

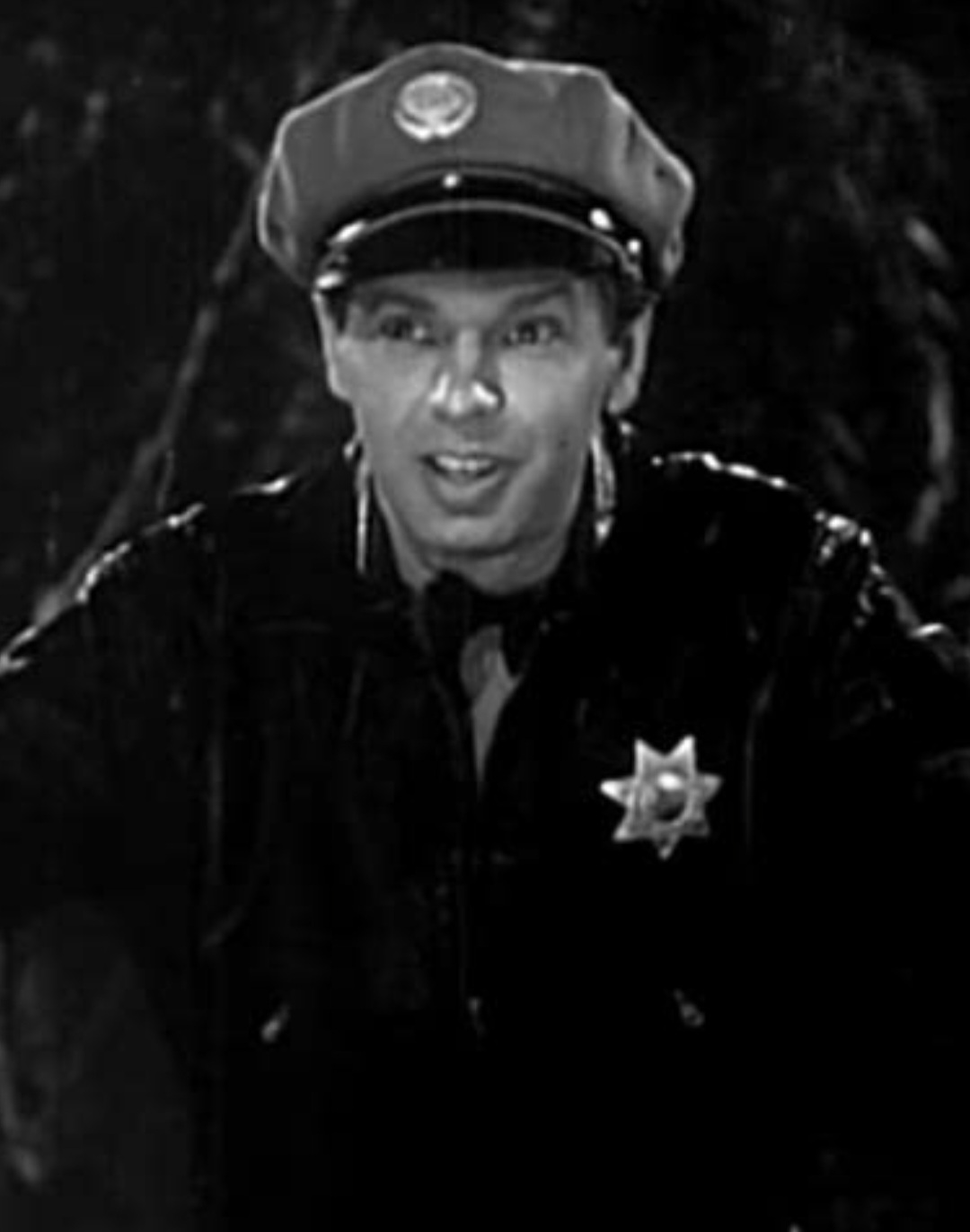
- Twitchell in The Missing Corpse (1945)
- Born: Archie Raymond Twitchell; November 28, 1906; Pendleton, Oregon, U.S.
- Died: January 31, 1957 (aged 50); Pacoima, California, U.S.
- Other name: Michael Branden
- Occupations: Pilot; actor
- Years active: 1937–1955

Archie Raymond Twitchell (November 28, 1906 – January 31, 1957) was an American actor and pilot who appeared in over 110 films during his career. He was a captain in the U.S. Army Air Forces during World War II, becoming a test pilot during the war and continuing in that specialization into the 1950s, making his last film appearance in 1955. He was killed in a 1957 mid-air collision during a test flight of a new four-engined Douglas DC-7B airliner that impacted in the Pacoima area of Los Angeles in the northeast San Fernando Valley.

== Background ==
Twitchell was born in Pendleton, Oregon, on November 28, 1906. He made his first solo flight in 1923. Two years later, he began an acting career that took him through over 100 movies and television shows. His six-foot, one-inch stature with his grey eyes and brown hair suited the camera. He was sometimes billed as Michael Brandan/Brandon/Branden.

Twitchell was also a pilot. Between making pictures, he flew. He toured air shows across the country in 1936, and was commissioned a second lieutenant in the Air Force in 1942. According to the Associated Press, during the war he tested fighter planes in North Africa and flew transports. In 1951, he tested planes in Israel for the Israeli Air Force. Beginning in February 1955, he had become a production test pilot for the Douglas Aircraft Co.

== Crash ==
On January 31, 1957, Twitchell was co-pilot on a test flight of a new Douglas DC-7B four-engine airliner over Southern California. The four crew failed to see a Northrop F-89 Scorpion fighter, also on a test flight, in time to avoid a mid-air collision. The Scorpion, coming out of 90-degree turn, struck the DC-7B almost head-on at 11:18 A.M., approximately 1–2 miles NE of the Hansen Dam spillway in the San Fernando Valley. With some 8 1/2 feet of the end of its port wing severed, the DC-7B continued on a westward heading for about 4 miles before breaking up 500 feet (150 m) to 1,000 feet (300 m) above the ground; its wreckage impacted in the courtyard of the Pacoima Congregational Church, across the street from Pacoima Junior High School near the corner of Laurel Canyon Boulevard and Terra Bella Street in the Pacoima area of Los Angeles; debris killed three students and injured some 74 others. California, killing all four crew.

The CAB accident report states that "At 1118 activity in the Douglas radio room was interrupted by an emergency transmission from N 8210H. The voices were recognized by radio personnel familiar with the crew members. Pilot Cart first transmitted, 'Uncontrollable,' Copilot Twitchell then said, 'We're a midair collision – midair collision, 10 How (aircraft identification using phonetic How for H) we are going in – uncontrollable – uncontrollable – we are ... we've had it boy – poor jet too – told you we should take chutes – say goodbye to everybody.'"

== Filmography ==
Year	Title	Role	Notes
1937	Sophie Lang Goes West	Clerk	
1937	This Way Please	Soldier	Uncredited
1937	Partners in Crime	Photographer	
1937	Hold 'Em Navy	Jerry Abbott	
1937	Daughter of Shanghai	Secretary	Uncredited
1937	Wells Fargo	Man with Paper	Uncredited
1938	The Buccaneer	Party Guest	Uncredited
1938	The Big Broadcast of 1938	Steward	Uncredited
1938	Scandal Street	Photographer	Uncredited
1938	Her Jungle Love	Roy Atkins	
1938	Tip-Off Girls	Hensler	
1938	Cocoanut Grove	Radio Station Technician	Uncredited
1938	You and Me	Salesman	Uncredited
1938	Prison Farm	Telegraph Operator	Uncredited
1938	Men with Wings	Nelson	Uncredited
1938	The Texans	Cpl. Thompson	Uncredited
1938	Give Me a Sailor	Businessman #3	Uncredited
1938	Spawn of the North	Fisherman	Uncredited
1938	Illegal Traffic	Duke	
1938	Say It in French	Elevator Operator	Uncredited
1938	Ride a Crooked Mile	Byrd	
1939	Disbarred	Juror	Uncredited
1939	Ambush	Bank Teller	
1939	St. Louis Blues	Cameraman	Uncredited
1939	Persons in Hiding	Co-Pilot	Uncredited
1939	King of Chinatown	Hospital Interne	
1939	Street of Missing Men	Reporter on Dock	Uncredited
1939	The Lady's from Kentucky	Radio Announcer	Uncredited
1939	Union Pacific	Secretary	Uncredited
1939	Mickey the Kid	Shelby, the Bus Driver	
1939	Flight at Midnight		Uncredited
1939	Calling All Marines	Ranger Radio Dispatcher	Uncredited
1939	The Arizona Kid	Lieutenant Fox	Uncredited
1939	Television Spy	Jim Winton	
1939	Geronimo	General's Orderly	Uncredited
1940	Wolf of New York	Cop	Uncredited
1940	Granny Get Your Gun	Joe	
1940	Buck Benny Rides Again	Mac - Attendant	Uncredited
1940	Manhattan Heartbeat	Pilot	Uncredited
1940	I Want a Divorce	Bill - Husband	Uncredited
1940	Dr. Kildare Goes Home	Bates	
1940	Charlie Chan at the Wax Museum	Carter Lane	
1940	Barnyard Follies		Uncredited
1940	Young Bill Hickok	Phillip	
1940	North West Mounted Police	Mountie	Uncredited
1940	Mysterious Doctor Satan	Ross	Serial
1940	Behind the News	Reporter	
1941	I Wanted Wings	Lt. Clarkton	
1941	Mr. District Attorney	Motorcycle Officer	Uncredited
1941	West Point Widow	Joe Martin	
1941	Caught in the Draft	Stretcher Patient	Uncredited
1941	Kiss the Boys Goodbye	Photographer	Uncredited
1941	Bad Man of Deadwood	Cavalry Lieutenant	Uncredited
1941	Prairie Stranger	Barton	
1941	Among the Living	Tom Reilly	
1941	Dick Tracy vs. Crime, Inc.	Radio Announcer	Serial, Voice, Uncredited
1941	Pacific Blackout	Suspicious Cafe Waiter	Uncredited
1942	The Fleet's In	Petty Officer	Uncredited
1942	A Tragedy at Midnight	Henry Carney	
1942	Sing Your Worries Away	Second Music Publisher	Uncredited
1942	Sabotuer	Motorcycle Cop	Voice
1942	Thundering Hoofs	Steve Farley	
1942	The Major and the Minor	Cadet Sergeant at Main Gate	Uncredited
1942	USS VD: Ship of Shame	'Doc' Taylor	Uncredited
1945	The Missing Corpse	Officer Jimmy Trigg	Uncredited
1945	Swingin' on a Rainbow	Hotel Clerk	Uncredited
1945	Behind City Lights	Jewelry Salesman	Uncredited
1945	Don't Fence Me In	Police Officer	Uncredited
1946	The French Key	Murdock	
1946	O.S.S.	Officer	Uncredited
1946	Black Angel	George Mitchell	
1946	Angel on My Shoulder	Police Sergeant	Uncredited
1946	Accomplice	Sheriff Rucker	
1946	Affairs of Geraldine	Charlie March	
1946	That Brennan Girl	Minor Role	Uncredited
1947	The Arnelo Affair	Roger Alison	
1947	Suddenly, It's Spring	Captain Jergens	Uncredited
1947	Dishonored Lady	Freddie Fancher	Uncredited
1947	That's My Man		Uncredited
1947	Web of Danger	Ramsey, Meteorologist	
1947	Robin Hood of Texas	Jim Prescott	
1947	Second Chance	Barker	
1947	Out of the Past	Rafferty	Uncredited
1948	Fort Apache	Reporter	Uncredited
1948	Big Town Scandal	Newspaper Man	Uncredited
1948	Moonrise	Carnival Barker	Uncredited
1948	The Saxon Charm	Mr. Maddox	Uncredited
1948	Sealed Verdict	Medical Captain	
1949	Follow Me Quietly	Dixon	
1949	Mighty Joe Young	Reporter	Uncredited
1949	Red, Hot and Blue	Movie Patron in Trailer	Uncredited
1949	Chicago Deadline	Reporter	Uncredited
1949	Bride for Sale	Officer White	Uncredited
1950	The Daltons' Women	Honest Hank	Uncredited
1950	Mother Didn't Tell Me	Dr. Tod Morgan	Uncredited
1950	The Gunfighter	Johnny	Uncredited
1950	I Shot Billy the Kid	Saloon Tough Slapped by Billy	
1950	Sunset Boulevard	Salesman at Men's Shop	Uncredited
1950	Revenue Agent	Ernie Medford	
1951	Follow the Sun	Pro Golfer in Locker Room	Uncredited
1951	In Old Amarillo	Mike Carver	Uncredited
1951	Kentucky Jubilee	Barney Malone	
1951	The Thundering Trail	Gov. Tom Emery	
1951	Yes Sir, Mr. Bones	Emcee	
1951	The Vanishing Outpost	Mack	
1952	The Frontier Phantom	Sheriff	
1952	Kansas City Confidential	Police Dispatcher	Uncredited
1952	Off Limits	Officer	Uncredited
1954	The Long Wait	Heckling Workman	Uncredited
1954	The Bounty Hunter	Harrison	
1955	Illegal	Mr. Manning	Uncredited
