= The Black Lash =

1952 movie

- Theatrical release poster
- Directed by: Ron Ormond
- Written by: June Carr; Timothy Ormond; Kathy McKeel
- Produced by: Ron Ormond
- Music by: Walter Greene
- Production company: Western Adventures Productions Inc.
- Distributed by: Realart Pictures; Howco
- Release date: January 2, 1952
- Running time: 54 minutes
- Country: United States
- Language: English

The Black Lash is a 1952 American Western film produced and directed by Ron Ormond and starring Lash LaRue and Al "Fuzzy" St. John. It is the 11th of LaRue's films for Ormond's Western Adventures Productions. The film is also the fifth to be released by Ormond's film company Howco.

The screenplay is credited to Ormond's wife June Carr and his infant son Timothy. The film is mostly composed of footage from previous Ormond/LaRue Westerns, with the majority of scenes taken from Frontier Revenge (1948) with Ray Bennett, who repeats his role as the released Duce Rago, making The Black Lash a sequel to that film.

== Plot ==
Fuzzy Jones is separated from Lash LaRue, who is posing as one of the Dalton Gang with undercover range detective Lem Woodruff. Fuzzy teams with Lash and Lem, and they Duce Rago, who has only served six months of a life sentence.

== Cast ==
- Lash La Rue as Marshal Lash LaRue
- Al St. John as Fuzzy Q. Jones
- Ray Bennett as Deuce Rago
- Peggy Stewart as Joan Delysa
- Kermit Maynard as Lem Woodruff
- Byron Keith as Bill Leonard
- John L. Cason as Cord
- Clarke Stevens as Johnson
- Roy Butler as Mayor Redfield
- Larry Barton as Judge
- Cliff Taylor as Bartender
- Bud Osborne as Telegrapher
