= Dead Man's Gold =

1948 film directed by Ray Taylor

- Theatrical release poster
- Directed by: Ray Taylor
- Written by: Ron Ormond; Ira S. Webb (story)
- Produced by: Ron Ormond
- Starring: Lash LaRue
- Music by: Walter Greene
- Production company: Western Adventures Productions Inc.
- Distributed by: Screen Guild Productions
- Release date: September 10, 1948
- Running time: 60 minutes
- Country: United States
- Language: English

Dead Man's Gold is a 1948 American Western film, starring Lash LaRue and Al "Fuzzy" St. John, the first of his Westerns for producer Ron Ormond.

== Plot ==
When rancher Jim Thornton discovers gold in Gold Valley, he sends for Lash and Fuzzy to protect his treasure from a band of gunslingers.

== Cast ==
- Lash LaRue as Lash LaRue
- Al St. John as Fuzzy Q. Jones
- Peggy Stewart as June Thornton
- Terry Frost as Joe Quirt
- John Cason as Matt Conway
- Pierce Lyden as Sliver
- Lane Bradford as Mayor Evans
- Stephen Keyes as Henchman Morgan
- Marshall Reed as Man on Stagecoach
- Britt Wood as Bartender
- Cliff Taylor as Townsman
