= Son of a Bad Man =

1949 film

- Theatrical release poster
- Directed by: Ray Taylor
- Written by: Ron Ormond; Ira S. Webb
- Produced by: Ron Ormond
- Music by: Walter Greene
- Production company: Western Adventures Productions Inc.
- Distributed by: Screen Guild Productions
- Release date: April 16, 1949
- Running time: 64 minutes
- Country: United States
- Language: English

Son of a Bad Man is a 1949 American Western film directed by Ray Taylor starring Lash LaRue and Al "Fuzzy" St. John. The film was shot at the Iverson Movie Ranch.

== Plot ==
Lash and Fuzzy investigate the masked bandit El Sombre and an Eastern Syndicate buying up land to illegally charge tolls.

== Cast ==
- Lash La Rue as Marshal Lash La Rue
- Al St. John as Deputy Fuzzy Q. Jones
- Noel Neill as Vicki Burley
- Jack Ingram as Rocky
- Francis McDonald as Joe Christ
- Don C. Harvey as Sheriff Ragle
- Frank Lackteen as Piute
- Edna Holland as Mrs. Burley
