= Law of the Lash =

1947 film by Ray Taylor

- Theatrical release poster
- Directed by: Ray Taylor
- Written by: William L. Nolte (original screenplay)
- Produced by: Jerry Thomas
- Starring: See below
- Cinematography: Robert E. Cline
- Edited by: Hugh Winn
- Music by: Albert Glasser
- Distributed by: Producers Releasing Corporation
- Release date: 1947
- Running time: 53 minutes
- Country: United States
- Language: English

Law of the Lash is a 1947 American Western film directed by Ray Taylor. It was the first lead role of Lash LaRue who had previously appeared in three of PRC's Eddie Dean Cinecolor Westerns, and the first pairing of Lash with sidekick Al "Fuzzy" St. John.

== Plot ==
A U.S. marshal attempts to clean up a town that has been taken over by crooks.

== Cast ==
- Lash LaRue as "Cheyenne" Davis
- Al St. John as Fuzzy
- Lee Roberts as Henchman "Lefty"
- Mary Scott as Jane Hilton
- Jack O'Shea as Gang Leader Decker, aka Dude Bracken
- Charles King as Sheriff Rand
- Carl Mathews as Henchman "Blackie"
- Matty Roubert as Henchman "Peewee"
- John Elliott as Dad Hilton
- Slim Whitaker as Henchman Bart
- Ted French as Henchman "Smitty"
- Richard Cramer as Jake, the Bartender
