= Rimfire =

Rimfire may refer to:

- Rimfire (film), a 1949 noir Western
- Rimfire ammunition, a type of firearm cartridge

== See also ==
- Rim Fire, a 2013 wildfire in California
- Rim of fire, an alternate name of the Ring of Fire
