= The Girl from Tobacco Row =

- Theatrical release poster
- Directed by: Ron Ormond
- Written by: Ron Ormond
- Produced by: Ron Ormond, June Carr
- Starring: Tex Ritter; Rachel Romen; Earl Sinks
- Cinematography: Sid O'Berry
- Edited by: Paul Jasiukonis
- Music by: Tommy Hill
- Production company: Ormond International
- Release date: August 24, 1966
- Running time: 87 minutes
- Country: United States
- Language: English

The Girl from Tobacco Row is a low budget 1966 American film directed by Ron Ormond and starring country music singers Tex Ritter and Earl Sinks alongside Rachel Romen.

== Plot ==
Working on a chain gang, "Snake" Richards learns from a fellow prisoner has stashed money prior to his imprisonment. A breakout soon takes place, but the prisoner who knows where the loot is held is killed in the escape. The stash is also sought after by a crime boss and his gang, who are expecting someone will lead them to it. Heading towards the location, Snake is taken in by a kindly family headed by Reverend Bolton and begins to wonder if a more pious life would provide a better reward than finding the money itself. He attracts attention from the reverend's older daughter Nadine, though Snake is more interested in her quieter younger sister Rita. Nadine for her part is also interested in the local sheriff.

== Cast ==
- Tex Ritter as Reverend E.F. Bolton
- Rachel Romen as Nadine Bolton
- Earl Sinks (credited as Earl 'Snake' Richards) as 'Snake' Richards
- Gordon Terry as Sheriff Tom
- Rita Faye as Rita Bolton
- Ralph Emery as Blinky, the Hit-Man
- Johnny Russell as Cephus

== Productions ==
Much of the film consisted of performances by various country and gospel acts - in addition to Ritter, Sinks, Faye and Russell the movie included musical numbers from harmonica duo The Mulcahys, Fiddlin' Arthur Smith, Smiley and Kitty Wilson and Martha Carson. The Wilsons were the parents of Rita Faye, who in turn was married to Sink. The film was a turning point of sorts for both Sinks and writer-director-producer Ormond. Sinks would use the Earl Richards pseudonym for his records from 1969 to 1977, while Ormond would crash his private plane into a field in Nashville on his way to a screening of The Girl from Tobacco Row. After recovering his films changed tone to fit his more religious outlook on life.
