= The Dark Power =

- Blu-ray cover artwork
- Directed by: Phil Smoot
- Screenplay by: Phil Smoot
- Produced by: Phil Smoot; George B. Walker
- Starring: Lash LaRue
- Cinematography: Paul Hughen
- Edited by: Sherwood Jones
- Music by: Christopher Deane; Matt Kendrick
- Production company: Triad Motion Pictures
- Release date: February 13, 1987 (Greensboro, North Carolina)
- Running time: 87 minutes
- Country: United States
- Language: English
- Budget: $330,000

The Dark Power is a 1987 American supernatural horror film written and directed by Phil Smoot and starring Lash LaRue. It follows a group of young people who summon an exorcist to a rural house haunted by the spirits of Native Americans.

== Cast ==
- Lash LaRue as Ranger Girard
- Anna Lane Tatum as Beth
- Cynthia Bailey as Tammie
- Mary M. Dalton as Mary
- Paul Holman as Uncle Earl Coleman
- Cynthia Farbman as Lynn Evans
- Marc Matney as Craig Evans
- Tony Shaw as David Cody
- Robert Bushyhead as John "Four Eagles" Cody
- Suzie Martin as Suzan
- Dean Jones as Alan
- Steven Templeton as Dallas
- Page Elizabeth Ray as Page
- Eric Mikesall as Cletus
- Don Dahler as Photographer #1

== Production ==
The film marked actor Lash LaRue's first major role in several decades. The film was shot in late 1984 in Kernersville and Belews Creek, North Carolina, and produced by writer-director Phil Smoot's independent studio, Triad Motion Pictures. Principal photography began November 26, 1984, and was completed December 22, 1984. The budget was estimated to be $330,000. The film was shot on 16 mm film. The film's special effects were designed by Tony Elwood and Dean Jones.

== Release ==
The Dark Power had its world premiere at the Carolina Theatre in Greensboro, North Carolina on February 13, 1987.

=== Home media ===
The film was released on VHS in late October 1987. Kino Lorber released The Dark Power on Blu-ray featuring a new restoration from the original film elements on October 24, 2023.
