= Outlaw Country (1949 film) =

1949 film

- Original film poster
- Directed by: Ray Taylor
- Written by: Ron Ormond; Ira S. Webb
- Based on: story by Ormond and Webb
- Produced by: Ron Ormond
- Starring: Lash LaRue
- Music by: Walter Greene
- Distributed by: Screen Guild Productions
- Release date: January 7, 1949
- Running time: 72 minutes
- Country: United States
- Language: English

Outlaw Country is a 1949 American Western film directed by Ray Taylor and starring Lash LaRue and Al "Fuzzy" St. John. The film was shot at the Iverson Movie Ranch and was followed by the 1952 sequel The Frontier Phantom, which mostly consists of footage from Outlaw Country.

== Plot ==
Between the American and Mexican borders is a small area that is under the jurisdiction of neither nation. Jim McCord charges outlaws to stay in his domain, called Robbers Roost. McCord has also kidnapped a United States Treasury engraver and his daughter in order to create counterfeit money. U.S. Marshal Clark and his Mexican counterpart Señor Cordova recruit Marshal Lash La Rue and Deputy Fuzzy Q. Jones to run the outlaws out of business. One of the outlaws is Lash's twin brother, known as the Frontier Phantom.

Fuzzy studies to become a hypnotist and a wizard.

== Cast ==
- Lash La Rue as Marshal Lash La Rue / The Frontier Phantom
- Al St. John as Fuzzy Q. Jones
- Dan White as Jim McCord
- John Merton as Marshal Clark
- Ted Adams as Frank Evans
- Nancy Saunders as Jane Evans
- Lee Roberts as Buck
- Bob Duncan as Deputy
- Sandy Sanders as Deputy
- Max Terhune Jr. as Henchman
- Dee Cooper as Jeff
- House Peters Jr. as Cal Saunders
- Jack O'Shea as Señor Cordova
