= The Dalton Gang (film) =

1949 film

- Directed by: Ford Beebe
- Written by: Ford Beebe
- Produced by: June Carr; Ron Ormond; Ira Webb
- Starring: Don 'Red' Barry; Robert Lowery; Julie Adams
- Cinematography: Ernest Miller
- Edited by: Hugh Winn
- Music by: Walter Greene
- Production company: Donald Barry Productions
- Distributed by: Lippert Pictures
- Release date: October 21, 1949
- Running time: 58 minutes
- Country: United States
- Language: English

The Dalton Gang is a 1949 American Western film starring Don "Red" Barry and Julie Adams. It was directed by Ford Beebe.

== Plot ==
The Dalton gang has been carrying out a crime spree around the town of Rincon. U.S. Marshall Larry West is being sent to deal with them. On the way he encounters a man being chased by Indians. He is shot and falls from his horse but West interrupts the Indians before they can check if the man is dead. While West is tending the wounded man a stage arrives and West asks the driver to take the man to Rincon. When they arrive in town the townsfolk assume the wounded man, Joe, is the marshall as someone in town has been tipped off that one is being sent there. West convinces Joe to maintain the assumption so that he, West, can investigate undercover. West assumes the name Rusty Stevens. The local newspaper editor, Amos Boling, who has recognized West, is also sworn to secrecy.

Rusty meets Boling's assistant, Polly Medford, whose father was supposedly killed by the local indian chief Irahu, but she tells West that her father and Irahu were friends and she thinks Irahu is innocent. Irahu was jailed but then broken out by some of his braves. Rusty resolves to visit the tribe to get their side of the story. Iharu tells him a white man named Mack shot Medford.

Rusty visits J.J. Gorman, president of the land company, who is in fact leader of the Dalton gang. In his office are Gorman's lead henchmen, Blackie and Mack. He offers to work for Gorman as a hired gun but Mack says they won't need anyone as some hired guns are already on their way. When Gorman calls Mack by name Rusty realizes he is the man who killed Medford. When he leaves Mack tells Gorman that Rusty is really West as he was the one who tipped them off that he was coming. Gorman tells Blackie to arrange for someone to kill Rusty but to do it in front of enough witnesses to make it look like self-defense.

Gorman tells Sheriff Jeb to go out of town to serve some papers. After Gorman leaves the sheriff's office, the judge who Jeb has been playing cribbage with reminds him that every time he leaves town someone gets killed. Jeb says he knows it looks suspicious but he has no proof and doesn't want to cross Gorman.

When Emmett (aka Missouri Ganz) provokes Rusty into a gunfight West kills him even though Blackie drew first. One of the gang tries to shoot Rusty but is wounded. Blackie, Emmett's brother then gets the drop on Rusty from behind and takes him to the sheriff. He tells the sheriff that Rusty had been after Emmett and drew first and that the witnesses would confirm that version. Rusty tells the sheriff that he is a U.S. marshall but can't prove it. Then he spots Joe and tells the sheriff he will confirm who is who, but Joe sticks to the story that he, Joe, is really the marshall.

Polly asks Iharu to rescue Rusty, pointing out that he is in trouble because he believed Iharu's version of the murder of her father. Iharu and a few of his braves break Rusty out of jail. Rusty visits Blackie in his hotel room and threatens to turn him over to Iharu if he doesn't tell the truth. Blackie confirms the land company was behind Medford's murder and have committed crimes while dressed up as Navajos because the company needs the water. When Rusty tries to take Blackie out of his room Blackie knocks the gun out of Rusty's hand and they fight before Rusty manages to shoot Blackie in the arm. The gunshot rouses the gang members in the other rooms and Rusty forces Blackie to leave through the window. He takes him to the judge and gets him to tell the judge the truth.

Gorman gathers the whole gang to go after Rusty. While the judge is filling out the legal paperwork Blackie asks for a glass of water, when he is out of the room Blackie hides the gun that was sitting on the judges desk. When the judge returns Blackie kills him. Gorman instructs his men to spread themselves around town to be ready to attack the indians if they turn up. Amos returns to the judge with the sheriff and they find the judge and are sure Blackie did it. When Rusty returns he finds the warrants and Blackie's affidavit. This convinces the sheriff to take a stand against Gorman.

Rusty and the sheriff ride through town towards Gorman's office. A gunfight starts with the gang but they make it to the office before the indians arrive and the gang turn their guns on them allowing Rusty and the sheriff into building where they encounter Gorman as he is leaving his office with Blackie and two of the gang. Blackie goes back into the office while the others shoot it out. The sheriff is hit and the gang member killed before Gorman retreats to his office where he hides behind the door. When Rusty enters he sees Blackie about to bust out through the door on the other side and when Gorman tries to shoot him in the back but is out of bullets they wrestle for Rusty's gun before Blackie fires at them accidentally killing Gorman.

In the sheriff's office, the sheriff, who only has a bullet graze in his forehead, tells Rusty that his resignation has been refused. Rusty asks Polly if she would like a honeymoon in Santa Fe. Joe enters and admits that Rusty is the real marshall.

== Cast ==
- Don "Red" Barry as Marshal Larry West
- Robert Lowery as Blackie Dalton aka Blackie Mullet
- James Millican as Sheriff Jeb
- Greg McClure as Emmett Dalton aka Missouri Ganz
- Julie Adams as Polly Medford
- Byron Foulger as Amos Boling
- J. Farrell MacDonald as Judge Price
- George J. Lewis as Chief Irahu
- Ray Bennett as J. J. Gorman
- Marshall Reed as Joe
