= Square Dance Jubilee =

1949 film

- Directed by: Paul Landres
- Screenplay by: Ron Ormond; Daniel B. Ullman
- Based on: William L. Nolte (as William Nolte)
- Produced by: Ron Ormond
- Starring: Don "Red" Barry; Mary Beth Hughes; Wally Vernon
- Cinematography: Ernest Miller
- Edited by: Hugh Winn
- Music by: Walter Greene
- Production company: Donald Barry Productions
- Distributed by: Screen Guild Productions
- Release date: November 11, 1949 (United States)
- Running time: 79 minutes
- Country: United States
- Language: English

Square Dance Jubilee is a 1949 American Western musical film directed by Paul Landres starring Don "Red" Barry, Mary Beth Hughes and Wally Vernon.

== Plot ==
While searching for entertainers to place on a TV show, two talent scouts become entangled in cattle rustling.

== Cast ==
- Don "Red" Barry as Don Blake (as Don Barry)
- Mary Beth Hughes as Barbara Clayton
- Wally Vernon as Seldom Sam Jenks
- Spade Cooley as Spade Cooley
- Max Terhune as Sheriff
- John Eldredge as Jed Stratton
- Thurston Hall as G.K.
- Chester Clute as Yes-Man
- Tom Tyler as Henchman Buck
- Tom Kennedy as Bartender Tom
- Britt Wood as Grubby
- Clark Stevens as Henchman Jim Clark
- Marshall Reed as Charlie Jordan
- Lee Roberts as Line-Shack Henchman
- Alex Montoya as Alvin
- Cliff Taylor as Short Comic
- Ralph Moody as Indian Chief
- Hazel Nilsen as Secretary Betty (as Hazel Nilson)
- Snub Pollard as Show Spectator
- Tex Cooper as Show Spectator
- Dorothy Vernon as Townswoman
- Slim Gaut as Tall Comic (as Slim Gault)
- Hal King Television Opeator
- Cowboy Copas as Cowboy Copas
- Claude Casey as Singer
- The Broome Brothers as Broome Brothers
- Buddy McDonald as Townsman
- Smiley and Kitty as Singers
- Johnny Downs as Johnny Downs
- Herman the Hermit as Townsman
- Dana Gibson as Townswoman
- Ray Vaughn as Townsman
- Charles Cirillo as Townsman
- The Tumbleweed Tumblers as Tumblers
- Don Remey as Townsman
- The Elder Lovelies as Elder Dancers (as The Elder Lovlies)
- Les Gotcher as Square Dance Caller
