= Son of Billy the Kid =

1949 film

- Directed by: Ray Taylor
- Written by: June Carr; Ron Ormond; Ira S. Webb
- Produced by: Ron Ormond
- Starring: Lash LaRue
- Music by: Walter Greene
- Production company: Western Adventures Productions Inc.
- Distributed by: Screen Guild Productions
- Release date: April 2, 1949
- Running time: 65 minutes
- Country: United States
- Language: English

Son of Billy the Kid is a 1949 American Western film directed by Ray Taylor starring Lash LaRue. Produced by Ron Ormond, the film was co-written by Ormond's wife June Carr who also plays a lead role in the film. This film was not part of the 11-film Marshal Lash LaRue movie series, although it was made simultaneously with the series.

== Plot ==
The film imagines Billy the Kid was not killed and successfully adopted another identity.

Jack Garrett, no relation to Pat Garrett, interrupts a stagecoach holdup. He meets Fuzzy the town's stagecoach driver, station agent, baggage agent, Justice of the Peace, sheriff of the town and banker Jim Thorn. The trio team up to prevent robberies of Thorn's bank by Clem Yantis's large gang.

== Cast ==
- Lash LaRue as Jack Garrett
- Al St. John as Fuzzy
- June Carr as Betty Raines
- John James as Colt Thorn
- Marion Colby as Norma Berry
- Bob Duncan as Clem Yantis
- Terry Frost as Cy Shaeffer
- George Baxter as Jim Thorn
- Clarke Stevens as Yantis henchman
- I. Stanford Jolley as Matt Fergus
- Cliff Taylor as Jake
- William Perrott as Billy the Kid
- Rosa Turich as Rosa Gonzáles
- Jerry Riggio as Sanchos
- Felipe Turich as José Gonzáles
