= Yes Sir, Mr. Bones =

Yes Sir, Mr Bones
- Theatrical release poster
- Directed by: Ron Ormond
- Written by: Ron Ormond
- Produced by: Ron Ormond
- Starring: Billy Green; Gary Jackson
- Music by: Walter Greene
- Production company: Lippert Pictures
- Distributed by: Lippert Pictures
- Release date: July 13, 1951
- Running time: 54 minutes
- Country: United States
- Language: English

Yes Sir, Mr Bones is a 1951 American film written, produced, and directed by Ron Ormond and starring veteran minstrel Billy Green and youngster Gary Jackson. The movie follows the format of the minstrel show form of American theater, with African American show business veterans like Jester Hairston, as well as white actors wearing blackface makeup.

== Plot ==
A young boy finds himself in a home for retired minstrel show acts. He is anxious to find out as much as he can about them and the minstrel shows of the past, and flashbacks show what it was like back in the days of the minstrel shows.

== Production ==
Writer-producer-director Ron Ormond had been making hourlong "vaudeville show" features like Varieties on Parade and Hollywood Varieties for Lippert Pictures. These unpretentious, low-budget pictures were aimed directly at small-town theaters and rural audiences, where they were well received. Ormond attempted to vary the format slightly by using bygone minstrel-show acts instead of vaudeville acts, and Yes Sir, Mr. Bones resulted. Received as a novelty feature in its day, its appeal was more specialized than the vaudeville revues and did not result in any further minstrel-show films. It was released to television in the 1950s, and in later years was broadcast relatively infrequently, possibly owing to the controversy of blackface entertainment.

== Reception ==
Trade publisher Pete Harrison gave the film good marks: "For many years producers have made attempts to produce on the screen vaudeville acts, but they have more or less failed. This time, however, Ron Ormond, who wrote, produced and directed this picture, has succeeded. Those who see the picture will feel as if they are seeing live acts instead of shadow figures. The song, dance, and comedy routines are pleasing, and each of the performers succeed in capturing the flavor of an old-time minstrel show." Variety noted, "Today's crop of young theatregoers will get an idea of what the old-time minstrel show was like from Yes Sir, Mr. Bones. Turned out as a programmer for supporting bookings in the smaller situations, it will get by in that bracket."The Exhibitor called it a "pleasing filler for the lower half [of double-feature programs]. This is made on a low budget, but it should serve its purpose."

A more recent review from AllMovie critic Hal Erickson: "Ormond re-creates a vintage minstrel show. Veteran troupers strut their stuff and reminisce about their glory days in the late 19th and early 20th century," and "in addition to the many white performers in blackface, the film also features several genuine African-American entertainers, including the great Jester Hairston.
