= Tex Cooper =

American film and television actor

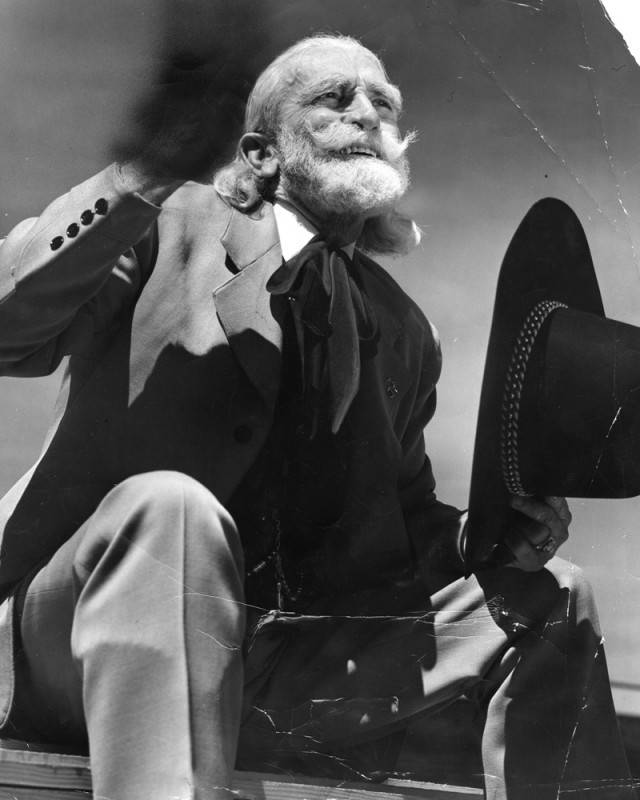
- Cooper in 1941
- Born: Judge Thomas Cooper; April 21, 1876; Texas, U.S.
- Died: March 29, 1951 (aged 74); Hollywood, California, U.S.
- Occupations: Film and television actor

Judge Thomas Cooper (April 21, 1876 – March 29, 1951) was an American film and television actor.

== Life and career ==
Cooper was born in Texas, and was raised in a ranch. He moved to Oklahoma in 1891, and performed with Buffalo Bill at the World's Columbian Exposition in 1893. He began his screen career in 1916, and in 1918, he appeared in the silent film Lest We Forget. Aside from acting in films, he played Buffalo Bill in numerous rodeos. According to Brooklyn Eagle, in 1941, he stated that his fortune was his "long white beard".

Later in his career, Cooper guest-starred in television programs including The Lone Ranger, The Range Rider and The Gene Autry Show. He also appeared in numerous films such as The Flame and the Arrow, Mississippi Rhythm, Frontier Outlaws, Casablanca, Lone Star Raiders, A Tornado in the Saddle, Roaring Frontiers, Young Mr. Lincoln, Days of Buffalo Bill, Prairie Rustlers, King of the Bullwhip, Boss of Rawhide, Return of the Frontiersman, The Fighting Kentuckian, Mississippi Rhythm, South of St. Louis, Tex Granger, The Sin of Harold Diddlebock and Badman's Territory.

Cooper retired from acting in 1952, last appearing in the film Montana Belle.

== Death ==
Cooper died on March 29, 1951, in Hollywood, California, at the age of 74.
