= Hostile Country =

1950 film

- Directed by: Thomas Carr
- Written by: Ron Ormond; Maurice Tombragel; Forbes Parkhill
- Produced by: Murray Lerner; Ron Ormond; Ira Webb; Robert L. Lippert
- Starring: James Ellison; Raymond Hatton; Julie Adams
- Cinematography: Ernest Miller
- Edited by: Hugh Winn
- Music by: Walter Greene
- Production company: Lippert Pictures
- Distributed by: Lippert Pictures
- Release date: March 24, 1950
- Running time: 59 minutes
- Country: United States
- Language: English

Hostile Country is a 1950 American Western film directed by Thomas Carr and starring James Ellison, Russell "Lucky" Hayden, Raymond Hatton, Julie Adams (credited as Betty Adams), Fuzzy Knight, and Tom Tyler. It is the first entry in the Ellison-Hayden Western series produced for action and B‑movie theaters of the early 1950s. This remake of No Man's Range (1935) centers on two drifting cowhands who stumble into a violent range war over a blocked mountain pass, uncovering a conspiracy involving land theft, impersonation, and a missing ranch owner.

== Plot ==
Partners Shamrock Ellison and Lucky Hayden ride into a remote valley where rancher Anne Green is struggling to move her horse herd through Deacon Pass, a route illegally barricaded by the ruthless Brady gang and their ally, the feared land baron Henry Oliver. The blockade threatens Anne’s contract with Mr. Lane, a government buyer who must receive the horses by noon the next day.

Shamrock reveals he has never met his stepfather, Henry Oliver, who supposedly owns land in the area. When the pair investigate Oliver’s ranch, they are ambushed by gunmen who mistake them for enemies. Anne’s foreman, Colonel Pat Higgins, confirms that Oliver’s men shoot strangers on sight, believing Shamrock and Lucky to be hired guns.

The situation escalates when Shamrock and Lucky enter a saloon card game and confront a man claiming to be Henry Oliver. After catching him cheating, Lucky shoots him in self‑defense but the town believes the two cowhands murdered Oliver to seize his estate. The sheriff forms a posse, forcing the partners to flee.

Captured by the Brady gang, Shamrock and Lucky learn the truth: the man killed in the saloon was Nolton, a criminal impersonating Oliver. The real Henry Oliver has been kidnapped and held prisoner so the Bradys can forge a will granting them control of both Oliver’s ranch and Anne Green’s land. Shamrock rescues the real Oliver, who confirms his identity and the gang’s scheme.

With dawn approaching and Anne’s deadline looming, Shamrock and Lucky blow open the barricaded pass using dynamite, allowing the herd to reach town in time. The Bradys pursue them, leading to a series of gunfights as the sheriff and townspeople join the fray.

In the final confrontation, Shamrock and Lucky defeat the Brady brothers, expose the forged will, and clear their names. Anne successfully sells her herd, and the valley is freed from the gang’s control. The film ends with comedic rivalry as Shamrock, Lucky, and Anne’s suitors bicker over who will win her affection.

== Cast ==
- James Ellison as Shamrock Ellison
- Russell Hayden as Lucky Hayden
- Raymond Hatton as Colonel Patrict
- Fuzzy Knight as Deacon Hall
- Julie Adams as Ann Green
- Tom Tyler as Tom Brady
- George J. Lewis as Jim Knowlton
- John Cason as Ed Brady
- Stanley Price as Sheriff
- Stephen Carr as Henchman Curt
- Dennis Moore as Henchman Pete
- George Chesebro as Henry H. Oliver
- Bud Osborne as Henchman

== Production ==
The film was produced as part of a low‑budget Western cycle aimed at small theaters and Saturday matinee audiences. Director Thomas Carr, a prolific maker of B‑Westerns, relied on familiar studio backlot towns, stock action sequences, and a tight shooting schedule typical of the genre.

The movie pairs Ellison and Hayden, both former sidekicks from the Hopalong Cassidy series, marking a deliberate attempt to capitalize on their established fan base. Julie Adams appears early in her career under her birth name, Betty Adams.

The film’s action includes horseback chases, saloon brawls, dynamite blasts, and large‑scale gunfights, all characteristic of Carr’s energetic directing style.

== Themes ==
- Range‑war justice: The story centers on illegal land control and the struggle of ranchers against corrupt power.
- Identity and deception: The impersonation of Henry Oliver drives the plot and highlights the fragility of frontier law.
- Partnership and loyalty: Shamrock and Lucky’s camaraderie provides both humor and heroism.
- Frontier independence: Anne Green’s determination to run her ranch underscores the film’s portrayal of capable women in Westerns.

== Reception ==
While not a major studio release, Hostile Country has gained appreciation among Western enthusiasts for its fast pacing, classic action sequences, and the pairing of Ellison and Hayden. Modern viewers note its charm as a representative B‑Western of the era, with several reviewers praising its “action‑packed storyline” and nostalgic appeal.

== Legacy ==
The film survives through television syndication and online archival releases. It is often discussed in the context of mid‑century Western remakes, as Ellison and Hayden starred in several re‑interpretations of earlier 1930s–40s Western plots.

== Bibliography ==
- Pitts, Michael R. Western Movies: A Guide to 5,105 Feature Films. McFarland, 2012.
