= Frontier Revenge =

1948 film directed by Ray Taylor

- Directed by: Ray Taylor
- Written by: Ray Taylor
- Starring: Lash LaRue
- Cinematography: James S. Brown Jr.
- Music by: Walter Greene
- Production company: Western Adventures Productions Inc.
- Distributed by: Screen Guild Productions
- Release date: December 17, 1948
- Running time: 56 minutes
- Country: United States
- Language: English

Frontier Revenge is a 1948 American Western film written and directed by Ray Taylor and starring Lash LaRue and Al "Fuzzy" St. John. The film is a remake of Ray Taylor's Panamint's Bad Man (1938). Filmed at the Corriganville Movie Ranch, the film is neither set on a frontier nor is any revenge depicted. Extensive footage from this film was reused along with the return of Duce Rago in The Black Lash (1952).

== Plot ==
Marshal Lash and Deputy Fuzzy impersonate an outlaw duo from Texas named the Dawsons in order to stop a series of robberies. They are helped by a marshal's widow and an undercover government operator.

== Cast ==
- Lash LaRue ... U.S. Marshal Lash LaRue
- Al St. John ... Fuzzy Q. Jones
- Peggy Stewart .. Joan De Lysa
- Ray Bennett ... Duce Rago
- Jim Bannon ... Brant
- Sarah Padden ... Widow Owens
- Jimmy Martin ... Pete
- George Chesebro ... Colonel Winston
- Cliff Taylor ... Bartender
