= Ringside (1949 film) =

1949 film by Frank McDonald

- Film poster
- Directed by: Frank McDonald
- Written by: Ron Ormond (adaptation)
- Story by: Daniel B. Ullman
- Produced by: Ron Ormond
- Starring: Don "Red" Barry; Tom Brown; Sheila Ryan
- Cinematography: Ernest Miller
- Edited by: Hugh Winn
- Music by: Walter Greene
- Production company: Lippert Pictures
- Distributed by: Screen Guild Productions
- Release date: 14 July 1949
- Running time: 68 minutes
- Country: United States
- Language: English

Ringside is a 1949 American film noir drama sport film directed by Frank McDonald for Lippert Pictures from a story by Daniel B. Ullman, adapted by Ron Ormond.

== Plot ==
Don Barry plays a pianist who turns to boxing to avenge his brother.

== Cast ==
- Don 'Red' Barry as Mike O'Hara / King Cobra (as Don Barry)
- Tom Brown as Joe O'Hara
- Sheila Ryan as Janet' J.L.' Branningan
- Margia Dean as Joy White
- John Cason as Tiger Johnson
- Joseph Crehan as Oscar Brannigan
- Lyle Talbot as Radio Announcer
- William Edmunds as Prof. Berger
- Harry Brown as Fight Manager
- Chester Clute as Timid Man
- Michael Vallon as Battor (as Mike Vallon)
- Edit Angold as Mama Berger
- Jimmy Martin Fight Second (as Jimmie Martin)
- Sam Flint as Doctor
- Frankie Van as Referee
- Don Tobey as Fight Announcer
- Joey Adams as Duke Hensel
- Tony Canzoneri as Swinger Markham
- Mark Platt as Gangster
