= Lash LaRue =

American actor (1917–1996)

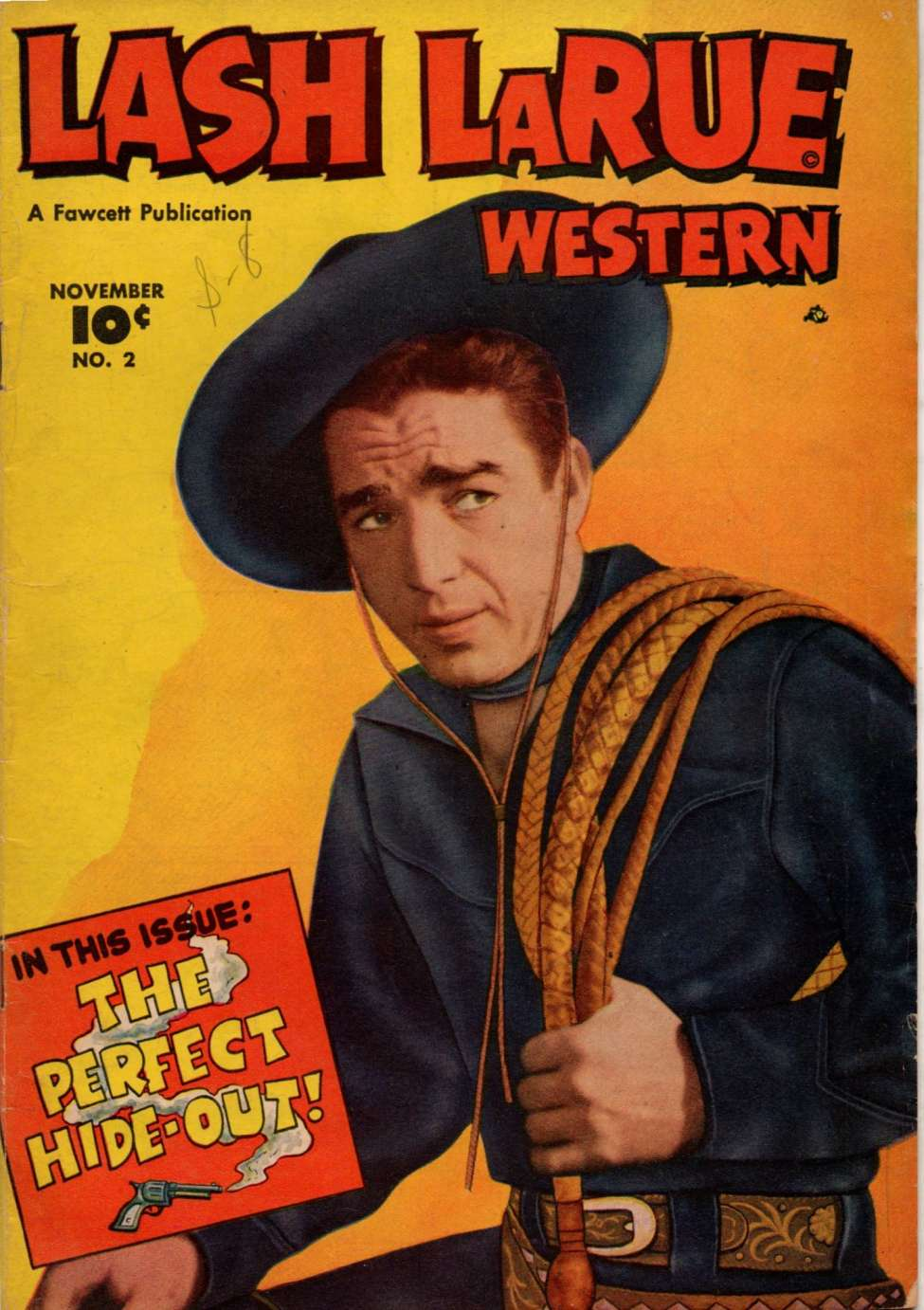
- Lash LaRue, from the cover of Lash LaRue Western #2 (Fawcett Comics, Nov. 1949)
- Born: Alfred LaRue; June 15, 1917; Gretna, Louisiana, U.S.
- Died: May 21, 1996 (aged 78); Burbank, California, U.S.
- Other name: Al LaRue
- Occupation: Actor
- Years active: 1944–1990
- Spouses: Reno Browne; Barbra Fuller; Frances Bramlett

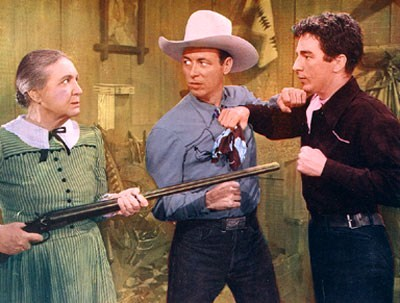
Sarah Padden, Eddie Dean, and Lash LaRue in Song of Old Wyoming (1945).

Alfred "Lash" LaRue (June 15, 1917 – May 21, 1996) was a Western motion picture star of the 1940s and 1950s.

== Early life and education ==
LaRue was born in Gretna, Louisiana, in 1917, and reared in various towns throughout Louisiana. In his teens the family moved to Los Angeles, California, where he attended St. John's Military Academy and the College of the Pacific. Strangely, his California death records reportedly indicate the actor's father's surname was Wilson and that Lash was born in Michigan.

== Career ==
=== Film ===
LaRue was originally screen-tested by Warner Bros. but was rejected because he looked too much like Humphrey Bogart, then one of the studio's contract stars.

He signed a contract with Universal Pictures in 1944 as "Alfred LaRue", appearing in two Deanna Durbin musicals (Durbin and LaRue were romantically involved during his tenure there). He was also featured in a Universal serial, The Master Key (1945).

In 1945 independent producer Robert Emmett Tansey, releasing through the small PRC studio, launched a new Western series with a difference: the features would be filmed in then-unusual Cinecolor. Singing cowboy Eddie Dean starred, with "Al LaRue" featured as "The Cheyenne Kid" and using a bullwhip expertly to disarm villains.

LaRue graduated to his own starring series (as "Cheyenne") in 1947, first for PRC, then for its successor Eagle-Lion (which continued to use the PRC brand name for its Westerns), and finally for producer Ron Ormond. It was at this time that he developed his image as cowboy hero Lash LaRue, dressed all in black. Al St. John had been Buster Crabbe's comic sidekick in PRC Westerns; after Crabbe left the studio, St. John's character "Fuzzy Q. Jones" was written into the Lash LaRue scripts.

Lash LaRue was different from the usual cowboy hero of the era. Dressed in black, he spoke with a "city tough-guy" accent somewhat like that of Humphrey Bogart, whom he physically resembled. His use of a bullwhip, however, was what set him apart from contemporary cowboy stars such as Gene Autry and Roy Rogers. His influence was felt throughout the dying medium of B-Westerns; for example, he had an imitator, Whip Wilson, who starred in his own brief series for Monogram, and even Roy Rogers started using a bullwhip in some of his Republic Westerns made during the same period.

LaRue made frequent personal appearances at small-town movie theaters that were showing his films during his heyday of 1948 to 1951, a common practice for cowboy stars in those days. However, his skillful displays of stunts with his whip, done live on movie theater stages, also convinced young Western fans that there was at least one cowboy hero who could perform in real life the things he did on screen. He continued working in films and television until he retired in 1990.

=== Television ===
In the later 1950s, LaRue was featured on the children's program The Gabby Hayes Show (in footage from his old PRC Westerns). He appeared several times on the syndicated television series 26 Men, true stories of the Arizona Rangers. LaRue also appeared on Jimmie Jackson's television show Memory Lane. He appeared seven times in different roles in the 1956 TV Western Judge Roy Bean. One of his roles on Judge Roy Bean was as the outlaw John Wesley Hardin. He portrayed another real-life criminal, Doc Barker, in the TV series Gangbusters; his performance was later edited into a feature film, Guns Don't Argue. LaRue and Steve Brodie shared the role (from 1959–1961) of Sheriff Johnny Behan in Cochise County, Arizona, on ABC's The Life and Legend of Wyatt Earp, starring Hugh O'Brian. LaRue appeared five times; Brodie, nine times.

A role as the villain in a pornographic Western, Hard on the Trail, in 1972, led him to repentance as a missionary for ten years, as he had not been informed of the adult nature of the film and would not have consented to appear in the film. He did not actually appear in any of the pornographic scenes. The film was later released without the pornographic scenes and retitled Hard Trail in an attempt to eliminate the double entendre.

== Personal life ==
For a time he was married to Reno Browne, a B-Western film actress, who together with Dale Evans was one of only two Western actresses ever to have their own comic book fashioned after their characters. He later married Barbra Fuller, a radio, film and television actress. Their marriage lasted 14 months; they wed February 23, 1951 in Yuma, Arizona, and divorced June 2, 1952. They had no children but did have a godchild, child actor J.P. Sloane, the son of "Television's Singing Troubadour" Jimmie Jackson and "Television's Hollywood Hostess" Anita Coleman.

== Death ==
LaRue died of emphysema in 1996 at Providence Saint Joseph Medical Center in Burbank, California. He had recently undergone triple-bypass surgery. He was cremated at Forest Lawn Memorial Park, Glendale, California. He was survived by his wife, Frances Bramlett LaRue, three sons and three daughters. He had reportedly been married at least ten times.

== Legacy ==
Writer/singer/producer Bruce Blackman of the pop group Starbuck wrote and recorded the tribute song "Lash LaRue", included on their 1976 album Moonlight Feels Right. LaRue is seen on the 1986 Johnny Cash and Waylon Jennings duet album Heroes. On the back cover, LaRue is standing with the duo. Winston Wolfe in Pulp Fiction (1994) mocked Vincent Vega for being "trigger happy" by calling him "Lash LaRue". Professional wrestler Mark LeRoux borrowed his ring name from LaRue, dubbing himself "Lash LeRoux" in 1999.

== Filmography ==
Year	Title	Role	Studio	Notes
1944	Christmas Holiday	Man	Universal Pictures	Uncredited
1945	The Master Key	Migsy	Universal Pictures	Serial; credited as "Alfred La Rue"
1945	Lady on a Train	Circus club waiter	Universal Pictures	
1945	Song of Old Wyoming	The Cheyenne Kid	Producers Releasing Corporation	Credited as "Al La Rue"
1946	The Caravan Trail	Cherokee	Producers Releasing Corporation	
1946	Wild West	Stormy Day	Producers Releasing Corporation	Aka Prairie Outlaws
1947	Law of the Lash	Cheyenne Davis	Producers Releasing Corporation	First lead role
1947	Border Feud	Cheyenne Davis	Producers Releasing Corporation	
1947	Pioneer Justice	Cheyenne Davis	Producers Releasing Corporation	
1947	Heartaches	DeLong / Trigger Malone	Producers Releasing Corporation	
1947	Ghost Town Renegades	Cheyenne Davis	Producers Releasing Corporation	
1947	Stage to Mesa City	Cheyenne Davis	Producers Releasing Corporation	
1947	Return of the Lash	Cheyenne Davis	Producers Releasing Corporation	
1947	The Fighting Vigilantes	Cheyenne Davis	Producers Releasing Corporation	
1947	Cheyenne Takes Over	Cheyenne Davis	Producers Releasing Corporation	
1948	The Enchanted Valley	Pretty Boy	Eagle-Lion Films	
1948	Dead Man's Gold	Marshal Lash LaRue	Western Adventure Productions, Inc.	
1948	Mark of the Lash	Marshal Lash LaRue	Western Adventure Productions, Inc.	
1948	Frontier Revenge	Marshal Lash LaRue	Western Adventure Productions, Inc.	
1949	Outlaw Country	Marshal Lash LaRue	Western Adventure Productions, Inc.	
1949	Son of Billy the Kid	Jack Garrett	Western Adventure Productions, Inc.	
1949	Son of a Bad Man	Marshal Lash LaRue	Western Adventure Productions, Inc.	
1950	The Daltons' Women	Marshal Lash LaRue	Western Adventure Productions, Inc.	
1950	King of the Bullwhip	Marshal Lash LaRue	Western Adventure Productions, Inc.	
1951	The Thundering Trail	Marshal Lash LaRue	Western Adventure Productions, Inc.	
1951	The Vanishing Outpost	Marshal Lash LaRue	Western Adventure Productions, Inc.	
1952	The Black Lash	Marshal Lash LaRue	Western Adventure Productions, Inc.	
1952	The Frontier Phantom	Marshal Lash LaRue	Western Adventure Productions, Inc.	
1957	Guns Don't Argue	Doc Barker	Visual Drama Inc.	feature film compiled from the TV series Gangbusters

Comics

Lash LaRue Western comic books were published first by Fawcett Comics (issues #1 through 46) and later by Charlton Comics (issues #47 through 84), between 1949 and 1961. The first issue alone today is worth upwards of $1,000 in near mint condition. They were among the most popular Western-themed comics of the era. Initially, LaRue and other Western stars weren't paid royalties by Fawcett; they were satisfied with just the publicity. (AC later published two reprint editions in 1990.) LaRue comics sold well with a total of 12 million copies in 1952 alone. Many stories featured his godson, J.P. Sloane.

Later films

Year	Title	Role	Notes
1963	Please Don't Touch Me	Bill	
1969	Lanton Mills	Phantom	Short
1972	Hard on the Trail	Slade	Pornographic film
1984	Chain Gang		
1985	Alien Outlaw	Alex Thompson	
1987	The Dark Power	Ranger Girard	
1986	Stagecoach	Lash	Television film
1989	Escape	Gas station owner	
1990	Pair of Aces	Henry	Television film

== Bibliography ==
- Lash LaRue, the King of the Bullwhip, by Chuck Thornton and David Rothel (Empire Publishing, NC, 1988). ISBN 0-944019-06-4.
- The King of the Bullwhip: Lash LaRue, the Man, not the Legend, by Charles M. Sharpe (Sharpeco, NC, 1996). ASIN B0006QS5T6.
