= Marshal of Heldorado =

1950 American Western film

Marshall of Heldorado
- Directed by: Thomas Carr
- Written by: Ron Ormond; Maurice Tombragel
- Produced by: Ron Ormond executive Robert L. Lippert
- Cinematography: Ernest Miller
- Production company: Lippert Pictures
- Distributed by: Lippert Pictures
- Release date: April 21, 1950
- Running time: 54 minutes
- Country: United States
- Language: English

Marshal of Heldorado is a 1950 American Western film starring Russell Hayden, James Ellison, and Julie Adams (credited early in her career as Betty Adams). The film blends traditional frontier action with light comedy, following a timid newcomer who is mistaken for a deadly gunfighter and inadvertently becomes the town’s unlikely hero. The movie features a supporting cast of B‑Western regulars including Fuzzy Knight, Tom Tyler, Dennis Moore, and Raymond Hatton.

== Plot ==
The frontier town of Heldorado is terrorized by the Tulliver brothers, a gang of outlaws who routinely rob the local bank and intimidate the townspeople. The mayor and the town’s banker, Colonel, struggle to find anyone willing to wear the marshal’s badge because every candidate fears becoming a target.

Posing as a stranger, James "Shamrock" Ellison has been sent to round them up. He arrives in town posing as a dude looking for work. Mild‑mannered and unarmed, he rents a small cabin outside town, unaware that the Tullivers have hidden stolen bank loot inside its fireplace. When two of the brothers return to retrieve the money, they end up killing each other during an argument over how to split the loot. Ellison discovers the bodies, and the townspeople mistakenly believe he single‑handedly gunned down the notorious outlaws.

The mayor seizes the opportunity and appoints Ellison as Deputy Marshal, despite Ellison’s protests that he is not a gunfighter. His accidental reputation grows when he survives several encounters with the remaining Tulliver brothers often through luck, misunderstanding, or the intervention of others.

Ellison becomes close to Anne, the Colonel’s daughter, and takes a job at the bank. Meanwhile, the Colonel is secretly involved in financial misconduct, having embezzled funds to help local homesteaders. Fearing exposure by the new “deadly” deputy, he cooperates with the Tullivers, who plan a final raid on the bank.

When the gang storms Heldorado, Ellison and the real marshal rally the townspeople. After a prolonged shootout, the Tulliver gang is defeated. Ellison proves his courage at last, not through sharpshooting, but through determination and quick thinking. The town rewards him with a $500 check and celebrates him as the man who finally brought peace to Heldorado.

== Cast ==
- James Ellison as James "Shamrock" Ellison
- Russ "Lucky" Hayden as Russ "Lucky" Hayden
- Raymond Hatton as The colonel
- Fuzzy Knight as Deacon
- Betty Adams as Ann
- Tom Tyler as Mike Tulliver
- George Lewis as Nate Tulliver
- John Cason as Jake Tulliver
- Stanley Price as Marshal
- Stephen Carr as Razor Tulliver
- Dennis Moore as Doc Tulliver

== Production ==
The film was produced during the late era of B‑Western cinema, characterized by modest budgets, familiar frontier settings, and recurring genre actors. Much of the humor stems from Ellison’s fish‑out‑of‑water persona and the town’s exaggerated reverence for him. The movie includes several comedic set pieces, such as Ellison’s disastrous horseback mounting and his tense barbershop encounter with a Tulliver brother.

The saloon and town exteriors reflect typical studio backlot Western towns of the period. Viewers have noted visible crew shadows in late‑film outdoor scenes, a common artifact in low‑budget Westerns of the era.

== Themes ==
Marshal of Heldorado plays with the trope of the reluctant hero. Ellison’s bravery is not rooted in gunfighting skill but in moral integrity and circumstance. The film also satirizes frontier machismo, showing how quickly a town will elevate a man to legendary status based on misunderstanding.

== Reception ==
While not a major theatrical release, the film has gained modest attention among Western enthusiasts for its cast of genre favorites and its blend of comedy and action. Modern viewers often appreciate seeing Russell Hayden and James Ellison in later‑career roles, as well as an early appearance by Julie Adams.

== Legacy ==
The film survives today largely through television syndication and online archival releases. It is frequently discussed by fans of mid‑century Westerns and collectors of B‑movie cinema.
