= Mark of the Lash =

1948 film by Ray Taylor

- Directed by: Ray Taylor
- Written by: Ron Ormond; Ira S. Webb
- Produced by: Ron Ormond
- Starring: Lash LaRue
- Music by: Walter Greene
- Production company: Western Adventures Productions Inc.
- Distributed by: Screen Guild Productions
- Release date: October 15, 1948
- Running time: 60 minutes
- Country: United States
- Language: English

Mark of the Lash is a 1948 American Western film starring Lash LaRue and Al "Fuzzy" St. John and directed by Ray Taylor. Produced and co-written by Ron Ormond, the film was shot at the Jack Ingram Movie Ranch.

== Plot ==
Town boss Lance Taggart controls both the law and the water supply of the area using the former to keep the latter. After Taggart's men kill peace officers sent to investigate him, Marshal Lash Larue and Fuzzy bring Taggart and his gang to justice.

== Cast ==
- Lash LaRue as U.S. Marshal Lash LaRue
- Al St. John as Fuzzy Jones (as Fuzzy St. John)
- Suzi Crandall as Mary Phillips
- Jimmy Martin as Danny Phillips
- Marshall Reed as Lance Taggart
- John Cason as Colt Jackson
- Tom London as Lem Kimmerly
- Steve Dunhill as Jeff
- Lee Roberts as Ace Talbot
- Cliff Taylor as Spade
