= Rimfire (film) =

1949 film by B. Reeves Eason

- Theatrical release poster
- Directed by: B. Reeves Eason
- Written by: Ron Ormond; Arthur St. Claire; Frank Wisbar
- Produced by: Ron Ormond associate Ira S. Webb
- Starring: see list below
- Cinematography: Ernest Miller
- Edited by: Hugh Winn
- Music by: Walter Greene
- Production company: Lippert Productions
- Distributed by: Screen Guild Productions
- Release date: March 25, 1949
- Running time: 63 minutes
- Country: United States
- Language: English

Rimfire is a 1949 American Western film directed by B. Reeves Eason. It is a noir Western.

== Plot ==
The plot is a mystery revolving around Captain Tom Harvey, an undercover army agent played by James Millican, who is investigating the theft of army gold shipments. During his undercover investigations, Harvey takes on the job of deputy sheriff and is drawn into discovering the source of a ghost who is terrorizing the town. The ghost is apparently the manifestation of a gambler who was wrongly convicted and hanged for the gold thefts.

== Cast ==
- James Millican as Captain Tom Harvey
- Mary Beth Hughes as Polly
- Reed Hadley as The Abeline Kid
- Henry Hull as Editor Nathaniel Greeley
- Victor Kilian as Sheriff Jim Jordan
- Fuzzy Knight as Porky Hodges
- Chris-Pin Martin as Chico
- George Cleveland as Judge Gardner
- Margia Dean as Lolita
- Ray Bennett as Barney Bernard
- Glenn Strange as Curt Calvin
- John Cason as Blazer
- Jason Robards, Sr. as Banker Elkins
- I. Stanford Jolley as Toad Tyler
- Ben Erway as Deputy Sheriff Harry Wilson

== Production ==
Filming started December 15, 1948.

Margia Dean recalled "It was a good little picture. Some of them I made were corny, but this was pretty well done. These films were done fast with last minute script changes. If you hit your spot and said the dialogue, it was printed."
