= Colorado Ranger (film) =

1950 film by Thomas Carr

- Theatrical release poster
- Directed by: Thomas Carr
- Written by: Ron Ormond; Maurice Tombragel
- Produced by: Ron Ormond executive Robert L. Lippert
- Cinematography: Ernest Miller
- Production company: Lippert Pictures
- Distributed by: Lippert Pictures (US); Exclusive (UK)
- Release date: May 12, 1950
- Running time: 59 minutes
- Country: United States
- Language: English

Colorado Ranger is a 1950 American Western film starring James Ellison and directed by Thomas Carr.

== Cast ==
- James Ellison
- Russell Hayden
- Raymond Hatton
