= Texas Manhunt =

1949 film

- Directed by: Ford Beebe
- Screenplay by: Daniel B Ullman; Ron Ormond
- Based on: story by Ullman
- Produced by: Ron Ormond associate Ira Webb; June Carr
- Cinematography: Ernest Miller
- Production company: Lippert Pictures
- Distributed by: Screen Guild Productions
- Release date: December 17, 1949
- Running time: 60 minutes
- Country: United States
- Language: English

Texas Manhunt, also known as Red Desert, is a 1949 American Western film directed by Ford Beebe and starring Don "Red" Barry and Tom Neal.

== Cast ==
- Don Barry as Pecos Jones
- Tom Neal as John Williams
- Jack Holt as Deacon Smith
- Margia Dean as Hazel Carter
- Joseph Crehan as President Ulysses S. Grant
- Byron Foulger as Sparky Jackson, also known as Lefty Jordan
- John Cason as Bob Horn
- Tom London as Col. McMasters
- Holly Bane as Barton

== Producer ==
The film stars Margia Dean, who recalled "Don Barry was very nice, pleasant and polite to me. But, he was short. And that can create something of a problem. Tom Neal was in it, and I found him to be the serious, brooding type." She says Holt was in the film because producer Robert L Lippert "was good about using once-big names who were a little past their prime!... It was my first leading lady, but still a thankless part. You go in early in the morning for hair and makeup; then are driven a long ways to a dusty, hot, sticky location. At dusk, they take the leading lady's close-up—just when she's grimy! (Laughs) Those tight corsets and five pounds of wigs were all uncomfortable—as were those stagecoach rides—which were so bumpy! (Laughs)".
