= Varieties on Parade =

1951 film directed by Ron Ormond

- Theatrical release poster
- Directed by: Ron Ormond
- Produced by: June Carr
- Starring: Jackie Coogan; Eddie Garr; Eddie Dean
- Cinematography: Jack Greenhalgh
- Edited by: Jack Ogilvie
- Music by: Walter Greene
- Production company: Spartan Productions
- Distributed by: Lippert Pictures
- Release date: July 20, 1951
- Running time: 54 minutes
- Country: United States
- Language: English
- Budget: $10,000

Varieties on Parade is a 1951 American musical film directed by Ron Ormond and released by Lippert Pictures. The film is a simple variety hour with no plot, replicating a vaudeville show.

== Plot ==
Master of ceremonies Eddie Garr delivers a monologue about Hollywood locals trying to impress movie producers. He introduces a lineup of dancers, harmonica players, a dog act, a comic adagio act, acrobats, jugglers and cyclists. Guest stars are spotted between the acts: Jackie Coogan lampoons his 1921 breakthrough role as "The Kid," with Eddie Garr imitating Charlie Chaplin; Eddie Dean offers a cowboy song and engages Garr and Coogan in comic patter; Tom Neal and Iris Adrian, both featured in Lippert productions, perform a flirtation act and Lyle Talbot appears in a sketch with burlesque veterans Jean Carroll and Harry Rose.

== Cast ==
- Jackie Coogan
- Eddie Garr
- Eddie Dean
- Tom Neal
- Iris Adrian
- Lyle Talbot

== Production ==
In 1948, during the dawn of commercial television, many of its programs depended on live entertainment, relying on vaudeville specialty acts. This exposure created new interest in vaudeville performers and variety shows.

Beginning in 1949, former vaudeville dancing star June Carr and her husband, producer-director Ron Ormond, produced a series of vaudeville-based musical features on $10,000 budgets.
