= Hollywood Varieties =

1950 film directed by Paul Landres

Hollywood Varieties is a 1949 American film from Lippert Pictures, starring Robert Alda and a cast of vaudeville performers. The feature was directed by former film editor Paul Landres, who also edited this picture.

== Premise ==
Veteran burlesque, vaudeville, and movie star Robert Alda is the master of ceremonies for this filmed presentation of an actual vaudeville show. There is no plot; some 20 variety acts take the stage over the course of an hour.

== Cast ==
- Robert Alda, master of ceremonies
- Hoosier Hot Shots, musical comedians
- Shaw and Lee, comedy team
- 3 Rio Brothers, comedy team
- Glen Vernon and Eddie Ryan, comedy team
- Britt Wood, monologist
- Peggy Stewart, specialty
- Twirl, Whirl and a Girl, acrobats
- De Pina Troupe, specialty
- The Four Dandies, barbershop quartet
- Lois Ray, specialty

== Production ==
Robert L. Lippert was a former exhibitor, owning a chain of movie theaters. In 1945, disappointed with the major studios' failure to make inexpensive features for smaller markets, Lippert began making his own pictures. These quickly found a market among small neighborhood theaters, especially in rural areas.

Hollywood Varieties was produced in five days by former vaudevillian June Ormond. The film was one of a series of low-budget, hourlong musical revues financed by Robert L. Lippert. According to June Ormond:

I wrote this little beginning about vaudeville dying, and Bob Lippert loved it. The picture cost $10,000. 1 got all the acts I knew from my years on the road. We shot with three cameras in a downtown L.A. theater. I worked day and night on the picture, even slept on the set. Only problem was, I hadn't come up with the ending yet. I had 20 minutes — the crew was gonna quit at five and we couldn't afford to keep 'em around. I made one of my choreography maps with the dots, an' I said, 'Gimme a few minutes.' There was almost 100 people on the set, but I got 'em all where they had to go."

== Reception ==
Showmen's Trade Review predicted that Hollywood Varieties "should do well in the small towns and rural sections where there is little chance to see a vaudeville show. It is a film that should attract because it is a good show. There is no storyline to tie the acts together. Just a group of vaudevillians doing their stuff to entertain the customers." Trade reviewer Pete Harrison was more critical but still passed the picture: "Worth booking on a double bill in secondary theaters. It is a series of vaudeville acts, with well known new and old entertainers... [it] has about everything one expects to see in a vaudeville show — dancing, singing, roller skating, trained seals, comedians, acrobats, trained dogs, and a master of ceremonies. Some are interesting, some fair, and some just so-so. But on the whole the picture should get by with those who are not too fussy." Motion Picture Daily described the picture as a matter of taste but noted the novel idea: "The picture is a straightaway presentation of a wide variety of vaudeville turns, with Robert Alda, the only picture name in the cast, functioning as MC. It is therefore as good or as bad as a given picture audience may happen to consider the current supply of vaudeville talent good or bad. That makes the film a fair and proper implement for giving the vaudeville idea a test run." The film was successful and was followed by Holiday Rhythm (1950).
