= Fast on the Draw =

1950 film by Thomas Carr

Fast on the Draw is a 1950 American Western film directed by Thomas Carr.

== Cast ==
- James Ellison
- Russell Hayden
- Raymond Hatton
- Fuzzy Knight
- Julie Adams
- Tom Tyler
