= Ira S. Webb =

American film producer

- Born: May 12, 1899; Scottdale, Pennsylvania, United States
- Died: December 9, 1971 (aged 72); Los Angeles, California, United States
- Occupations: Film producer Set decorator
- Years active: 1935-1956

Ira S. Webb (May 12, 1899 – December 9, 1971) was an American film producer, set decorator, screenwriter, art director and film director. He won an Academy Award and was nominated for two more in the category Best Art Direction. He was the brother of "B"-film producer and director Harry S. Webb.

== Selected filmography ==
Webb won an Academy Awards for Best Art Direction and was nominated for two more:

Won

- Phantom of the Opera (1943)

Nominated

- Arabian Nights (1942)
- The Climax (1944)
