= Al St. John =

American film actor (1892–1963)

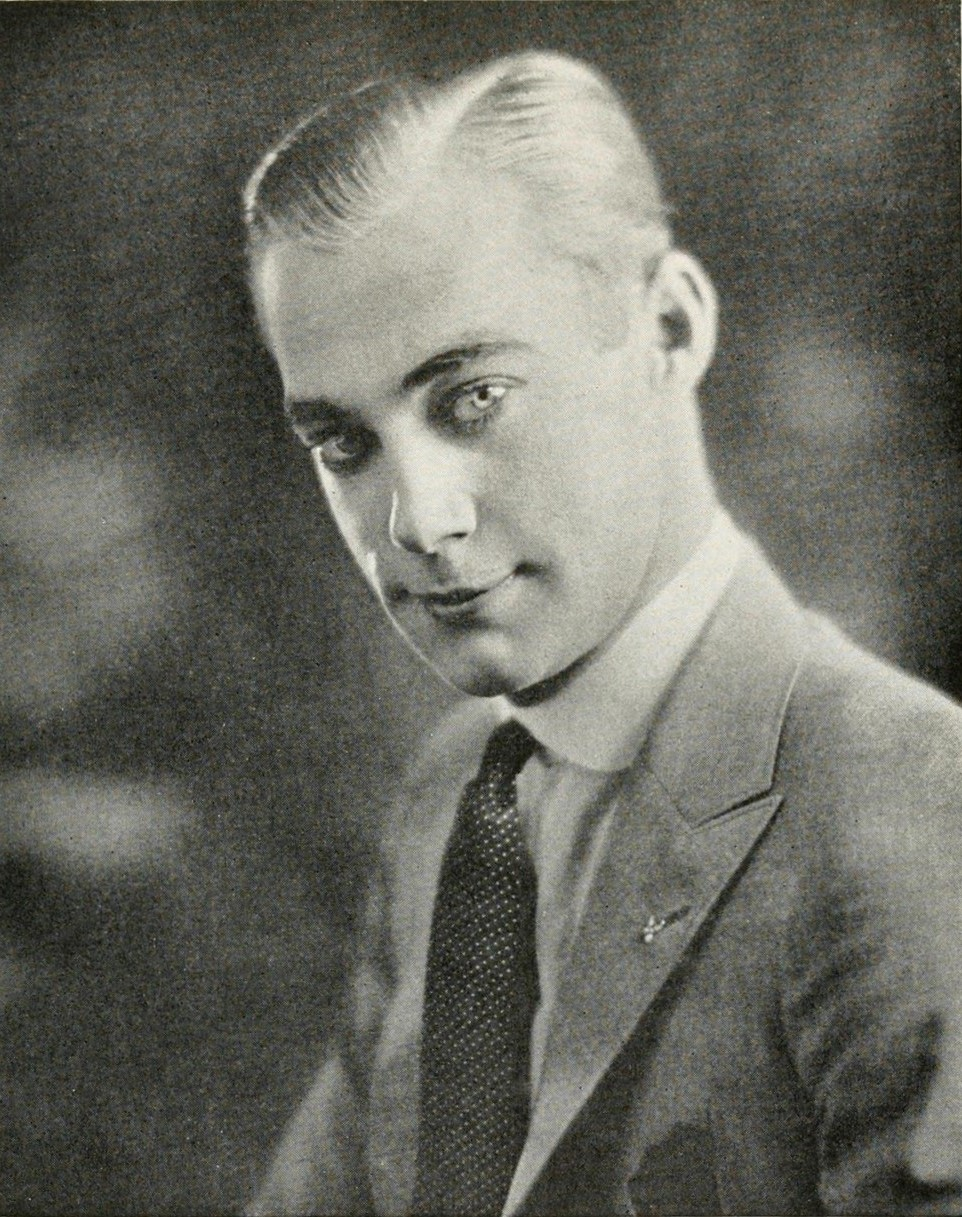
- Who's Who on the Screen, 1920
- Born: Alfred St. John; September 10, 1892; Santa Ana, California, US
- Died: January 21, 1963 (aged 70); Lyons, Georgia, US
- Occupations: Actor; comedian; stunt performer; director; writer
- Years active: 1912–1962
- Spouses: Lillian Marion Ball (m. 1914; div. 1923) June Price Pearce (m. 1926–1957): Yvonne St. John Flo-Bell Moore
- Children: 1
- Relatives: Roscoe "Fatty" Arbuckle (uncle)

Alfred St. John (September 10, 1892 – January 21, 1963) was an early American motion-picture comedian. He was a nephew of silent film star Roscoe "Fatty" Arbuckle, with whom he often performed on screen. Also credited as Al Saint John and "Fuzzy" St. John, he was employed by Mack Sennett and also worked with many other leading players such as Charlie Chaplin, Buster Keaton and Mabel Normand. His film career successfully transitioned from the silent era into sound, and by the late 1930s and 1940s he was working predominantly in Westerns, often portraying the scruffy comedy-relief character "Fuzzy Q. Jones". Among his notable performances in that role are in the Billy the Kid series of films released by the Producers Releasing Corporation from 1940 to 1946 and in that company's Lone Rider series from 1941 to 1943.

== Early life, family and education ==
Alfred St. John was born in Santa Ana, California. He was the only child of parents Walter St. John, who supported the family initially as a farm laborer and later as a house builder, and Nora N. St. John (née Arbuckle), who was the older sister of actor Roscoe "Fatty" Arbuckle. His uncle Roscoe was five years older than Alfred. In Los Angeles, he lived in the fashionable West Adams district at 4300 Victoria Park Drive in the neighborhood of Victoria Park.

== Career ==
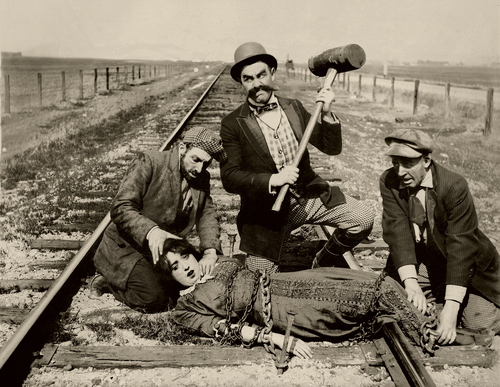
Barney Oldfield's A Race for a Life (1913) with left to right: Hank Mann, Ford Sterling, Al St. John and in the foreground Mabel Normand

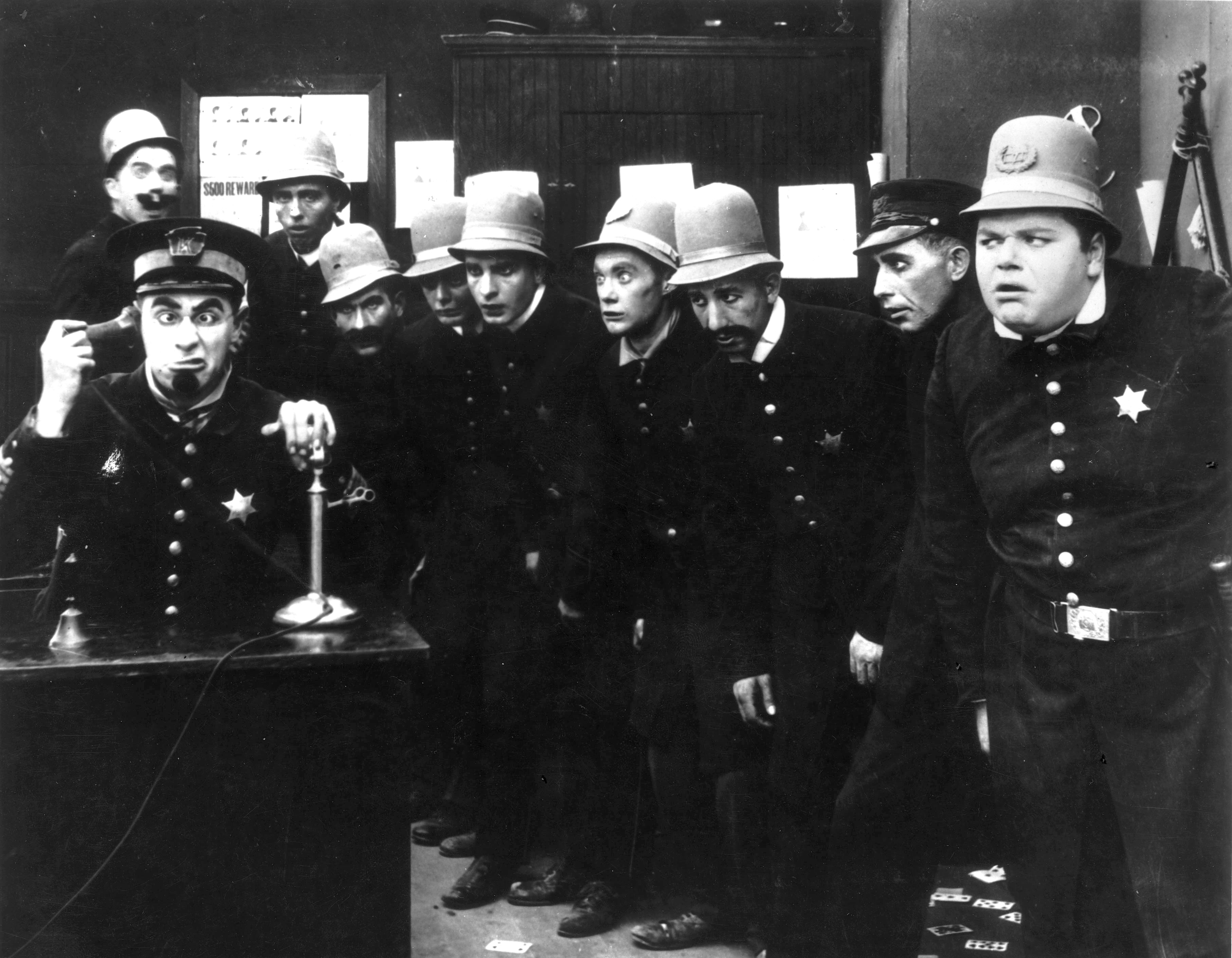
Left: Ford Sterling as Keystone Cops Police chief [seated}; 3rd from left: William Frawley; 4th from right: Al St John in In the Clutches of the Gang (1914)

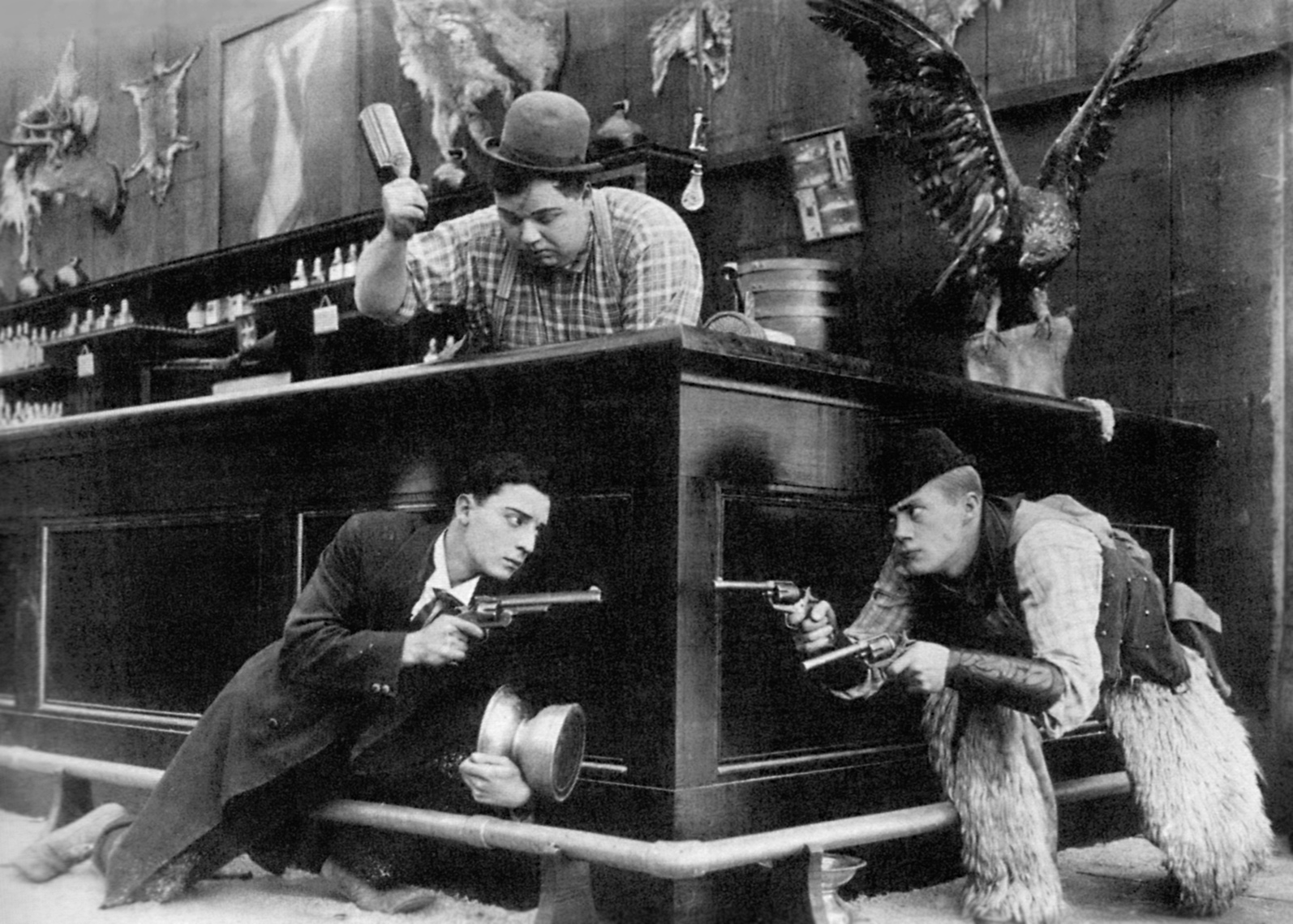
St. John (right) with Buster Keaton and Roscoe Arbuckle in Out West (1918)

Young "Al" entered silent films in 1911 to work as an extra and in minor character roles. Soon, however, he graduated to co-starring and then to starring roles in comedy shorts for a variety of studios.

St. John frequently appeared as Arbuckle's mischievously villainous rival for the attentions of leading ladies such as Mabel Normand and Minta Durfee. He worked with Arbuckle and Charles Chaplin in The Rounders (1914), although his most critically praised film during this period with Arbuckle remains Fatty and Mabel Adrift (1916). In France, he was billed as "Picratt".

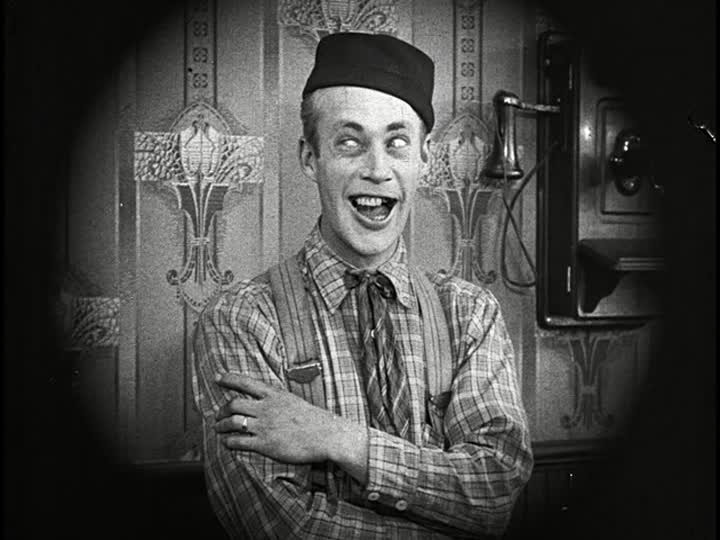
As Fatty's rival "Al Clove" in Love (1919)

When Arbuckle formed his own production company, he brought St. John with him and recruited stage star Buster Keaton into his films, creating a formidable roughhouse trio. After Arbuckle was involved in a widely publicized scandal that prevented him from appearing in movies, he pseudonymously directed his nephew Al as a comic leading man in silent and sound films such as The Iron Mule (1925) and Bridge Wives (1932). Dozens of St. John's early films were screened during the 56-film Arbuckle retrospective at the Museum of Modern Art in New York City in 2006.

As St. John's screen career continued through the 1930s, he was increasingly cast as scruffy, bearded comic characters. He appears, for example, in this type of role in Buster Keaton's 1937 comedy short Love Nest on Wheels, portraying the hillbilly character Uncle Jed. That year he began supporting cowboy stars Fred Scott and later Jack Randall, but most of his films were made for Poverty Row studio Producers Releasing Corporation (PRC). For that studio, he played "Fuzzy Q. Jones" in the Billy the Kid series starring Bob Steele, the Lone Rider series (starring George Houston and later Bob Livingston), and the Billy the Kid/Billy Carson series starring Buster Crabbe.

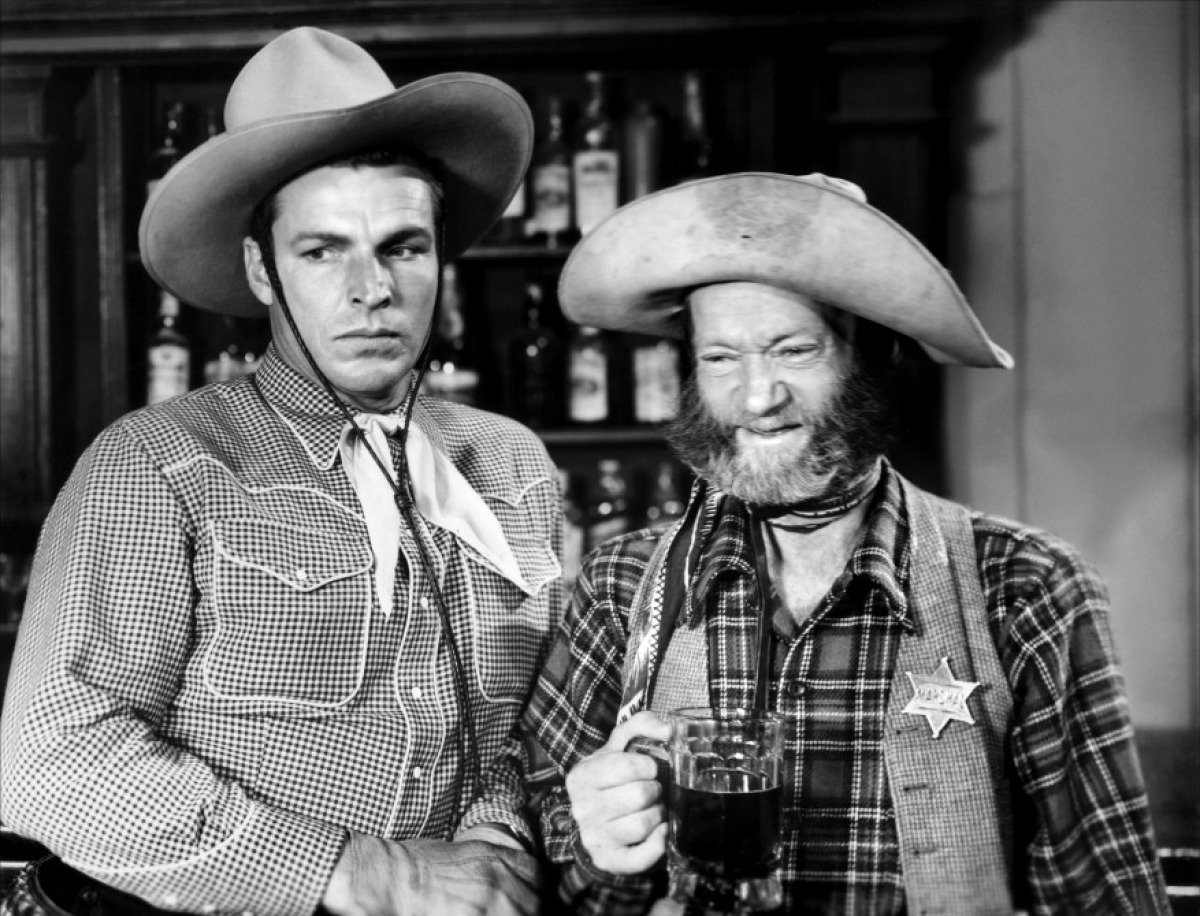
Buster Crabbe (left) with St. John in Shadows of Death (1945)

The name "Fuzzy" originally belonged to a different actor, John Forrest "Fuzzy" Knight, who took on the role of "cowboy sidekick" before St. John. The studio first intended to hire Knight for the Western series, but then gave the role to St. John, who took on the nickname of his rival for his screen character.

Exhibitors loved Fuzzy, who could be counted on to attract moviegoers. Fuzzy's character was the main box-office draw in these films when shown in England and Europe. These ultra-low-budget Westerns took only a bit more than a week to film, so that Crabbe and St. John made 36 films together in a surprisingly short time. When Crabbe left PRC (according to interviews, in disgust at the productions' increasingly low budgets), St. John was paired with new star Lash LaRue. Ultimately, St. John performed in more than 80 Westerns as Fuzzy.

St. John also created a character, "Stoney", in the film The Law of the 45's that later appeared, but played by different actors (including John Wayne), in the continuing Western film series The Three Mesquiteers.

St. John acted in more than 350 films during his screen career, which spanned the years 1911 through 1952.

== Final years ==
For a decade after the end of his motion-picture career, he made assorted personal appearances at fairs, rodeos, on television, and at overseas US military bases. He also performed with traveling live-action productions such as the Tommy Scott Wild West Show.

St. John had unwittingly missed an opportunity to co-star in a popular network-television series. In 1953 Buster Crabbe was preparing a new adventure series, Captain Gallant of the Foreign Legion, to be filmed on location in North Africa. According to the book biography of Buster Crabbe's longtime director Sam Newfield, "Asked who he'd like for a sidekick in the series, Crabbe immediately thought of his good friend and longtime sidekick Al 'Fuzzy' St. John. So he requested Fuzzy. His hopes were dashed when he found that they had hired Fuzzy Knight instead, thinking that he was the 'Fuzzy' that Crabbe had asked for."

St. John's death on January 21, 1963, occurred while he was touring with Scott. According to his obituaries, he suffered a massive heart attack at a motel in Lyons, Georgia, as he prepared for a special appearance at a nearby American Legion club. It was also widely reported in news accounts that the 70-year-old veteran entertainer died at the motel "in the arms of his wife, Flo-Bell Moore". After a private funeral service in Lyons, St. John's body was sent to Macon, Georgia, for cremation. His ashes were then transferred to Homosassa Springs, Florida, where they were "deposited" at Fuzzy and Flo-Bell's permanent residence on the couple's "Double F Ranch".

== Filmography ==
- Al St. John filmography
