= Robert L. Lippert =

American film producer (1909–1976)

- Born: March 31, 1909; Alameda, California, United States
- Died: November 16, 1976 (aged 67); Oakland, California, United States
- Occupations: Film producer, cinema chain owner

Robert Lenard Lippert (March 31, 1909 – November 16, 1976) was an American film producer and cinema chain owner. He was president and chief operating officer of Lippert Theatres, Affiliated Theatres and Transcontinental Theatres, all based in San Francisco, and at his height, he owned a chain of 139 movie theaters.

He helped finance more than 300 films, including the directorial debuts of Sam Fuller, James Clavell, and Burt Kennedy. His films include I Shot Jesse James (1949) and The Fly (1958) and he was known as "King of the Bs".

In 1962, Lippert said, "the word around Hollywood is: Lippert makes a lot of cheap pictures but he's never made a stinker".

== Biography ==
Born in Alameda, California and adopted by the owner of a hardware store, Robert Lippert became fascinated by the cinema at an early age. As a youngster, he worked a variety of jobs in local theaters, including projectionist and assistant manager. As a manager of a cinema during the Depression, Lippert encouraged regular attendance with promotions such as "Dish Night" and "Book Night."

Lippert went from cinema manager to owning a chain of cinemas in Alameda in 1942, during the peak years of theater attendance. Lippert's theaters in Los Angeles adopted a "grindhouse" policy, screening older and cheaper films for a continuous 24 hours with an admission price of 25 cents. Not only did his theaters attract shift workers and late-night revelers, but also servicemen on leave who could not find cheap accommodations and would sleep in the chairs.

In May 1948, he merged his theater chain with George Mann's, the founder of the Redwood Theatres. He also owned a number of drive-ins. The 139 theaters he eventually owned were mostly in Northern California and southern Oregon, as well as some in Southern California and Arizona.

== Screen Guild Productions ==
"Every theater owner thinks he can make pictures better than the ones they sent him," Lippert later said. "So back in 1943 [sic] I tried it" [the year was actually 1945]. Dissatisfied with what he believed to be exorbitant rental fees charged by major studios, Lippert formed Screen Guild Productions in 1945, its first release being a Bob Steele western called Wildfire, filmed in then-unusual Cinecolor. Veteran producer Edward Finney partnered with Lippert in 1946.

For the next few years Screen Guild entered into agreements with independent producers Finney, William Berke, William David, Jack Schwarz, Walter Colmes, and Ron Ormond to guarantee a steady supply of releases. One of the most controversial Screen Guild releases was The Burning Cross (1947), which concerned the Ku Klux Klan. In the main, however, Lippert concentrated on simple entertainments for small-town and neighborhood theaters: musicals, comedies, detective stories, action-adventure stories, and westerns.

== Lippert Pictures ==
Screen Guild became Lippert Pictures in 1948, using rental stages and the Corriganville Movie Ranch for the production of its films. Between 1948 and 1955, 130 Lippert features were made and released.

Lippert's fortunes and reputation improved when he sponsored screenwriter and former newspaper reporter Samuel Fuller. Fuller wanted to become a director, so he agreed to direct the three films he had been contracted to write for Lippert: I Shot Jesse James, The Baron of Arizona, and The Steel Helmet, all for no extra money, accepting just the directing credit. The Fuller films received excellent reviews.

A 1949 New York Times profile said Lippert owned 61 theaters. It also reported (erroneously) that he had directed most of the Westerns his company had made.

Lippert tried to add luster to his productions, but only if it could be done economically. His studio became a haven for actors whose careers were interrupted when their studios, now making fewer pictures, released them from their contracts. Robert Lippert was able to sign major-studio talent for a fraction of the usual rate, giving his productions marquee value and major-studio credentials. Among the established names who worked for Lippert were George Raft, Veronica Lake, Zachary Scott, Robert Hutton, Joan Leslie, Cesar Romero, George Reeves, Ralph Byrd, Richard Arlen, Don "Red" Barry, Robert Alda, Gloria Jean, Sabu, Jon Hall, Ellen Drew, Preston Foster, Jean Porter, Anne Gwynne, Jack Holt, Dick Foran, Hugh Beaumont, Tom Neal, Robert Lowery, John Howard, and Julie Bishop.

Lippert maintained a small stock company of supporting actors, including Margia Dean, Mara Lynn, Don Castle, and Reed Hadley. Lippert's most ubiquitous actor was probably the diminutive Sid Melton. He appeared as a supporting comedian in many of Lippert's productions and starred in three hourlong comedies.

The "name" cast ensembles were only part of Lippert's successful formula. Other selling angles were achieved when certain of Lippert's features could be marketed in a process more elaborate than ordinary black-and-white. Lippert used Cinecolor and sepiatone to dress up his more ambitious features, and embellished others by using tinted film stock for special effects (mint green for Lost Continent, pinkish red-sepia for the Mars sequences in Rocketship X-M). He even anticipated the 3-D film craze by publicizing a special, deep-focus photographic lens developed by Stephen E. Garutso, which Lippert promoted as giving a stereoscopic effect without special projection equipment.

Lippert also contracted with independent producers. In 1950 Ron Ormond hired two former members of the Hopalong Cassidy franchise, Russell Hayden and James Ellison, to co-star in a new series of six western features, with ingenue Betty Adams (later established as Julie Adams) and a stock company of actors familiar from westerns. With typical economy, Ormond arranged for all six scripts to be filmed simultaneously, to take advantage of the sets, locations, and actors on hand. The six features were filmed within one month.

In addition to his original productions, Lippert reissued older films to theaters under his own brand name, including 33 Hopalong Cassidy westerns and the Laurel and Hardy feature Babes in Toyland (reissued by Lippert as March of the Wooden Soldiers).

Lippert read a 1949 Life magazine article about a proposed rocket landing on the Moon. He rushed into production his version called Rocketship X-M, released a year later in 1950; he changed the film's destination to Mars to avoid copying exactly the same idea being utilized by producer George Pal in his large-budget, high-profile Destination Moon. Rocketship X-M succeeded in becoming the first post-war science fiction outer space drama to appear in theaters, but only by 20 days, while capitalizing on all the publicity surrounding the Pal film. More importantly, it became the first feature film drama to warn of the dangers and folly of full-scale atomic war.

=== Television and trade unions ===
Lippert was eager to enter the new and profitable field of commercial television. In 1950 he filmed a new detective series intended for sale to television -- but appearing in movie theaters first. Six half-hour episodes were filmed with co-stars Hugh Beaumont and Edward Brophy, which were then combined into three theatrical features: Pier 23, Danger Zone, and Roaring City. Trade reviewers noticed the paste-ups: "Having similar situations and dialogue, these episodes would be better if shown separately. Any dramatic effect achieved in the first loses its punch when so closely duplicated by a second story following immediately afterwards." Lippert later acquired episodes of the TV series Ramar of the Jungle and combined them into action features.

In 1951 Lippert announced plans to sell his films to television, at a time when major studios withheld their film libraries from TV to protect their theatrical interests. The American Federation of Musicians stepped in, and Lippert had to rescore some of the films and pay an amount to the musicians' music fund.

Lippert went ahead with the sale but clashed with the Screen Actors Guild and was blackballed by the Guild as a result. He was going to make films for television with Hal Roach, Jr., but problems with the Screen Actors Guild led to their cancellation. Lippert and Roach ended up making two features for theaters instead, Tales of Robin Hood and Present Arms (released as As You Were). In October 1951, Lippert signed a three-picture deal with the recently blacklisted screenwriter Carl Foreman. He also signed a two-picture deal with blacklisted actor Paul Henreid but no films appear to have resulted; Henreid signed instead with Columbia Pictures. In 1951, Lippert entered into an arrangement with Famous Artist Corporation to make features with their talent. By January 1952, however, the SAG dispute had not been resolved and Lippert announced he was leaving film production.

=== Hammer Films ===
In 1951, Lippert signed a four-year production and distribution contract with the British company Hammer Films by which Lippert would distribute Hammer movies in America, and Hammer would distribute Lippert's films in the United Kingdom. To ensure familiarity with American audiences, Lippert insisted on an American star supplied by him in the Hammer films he was to distribute. The first film produced under the contract was The Last Page, which starred George Brent.

== 20th Century-Fox ==
=== Regal Films ===
When Darryl F. Zanuck announced his CinemaScope process, he faced hostility from many theater owners who had gone to great expense to convert their theaters to show 3-D films that Hollywood had stopped making. Zanuck assured them that they could have a large supply of CinemaScope product because Fox would make CinemaScope lenses available to other film companies and start a production unit, led by Lippert, called Regal Films in 1956 to produce lower-budgeted pictures in that process.

Lippert's company was contracted to make 20 pictures a year for seven years, each to be shot in seven days for no more than $100,000. Due to Lippert's problems with the film unions over not paying residuals to actors and writers of his films when they were sold to television, Fox chose not to publicize Lippert's participation. Ed Baumgarten was officially appointed the head of Regal, but Lippert had overall control. Regal Films filmed its movies with CinemaScope lenses, but due to 20th Century-Fox insisting that only its "A" films would carry the CinemaScope label, Regal's product used the term "Regalscope" in its films' credits.

Beginning with Stagecoach to Fury (1956), Regal produced 25 pictures in its first year.

Maury Dexter, who worked at Regal, later recalled the outfit's productions were all shot at independent soundstages because they could not afford to shoot at 20th Century-Fox, due to the high cost of rental and overhead they charged. The films were entirely financed and released by Fox, but Regal was independent. Dexter says "the only stipulation production-wise was that we had to give Bausch and Lomb screen credit on each film for CinemaScope camera lenses, as well as being charged back to Fox, $3,000 of each budget.

Impressed by the unit's profits, Fox extended Regal's contract for 16 more films, with an "exploitation angle" that would be approved by Fox.

In November 1957, Regal announced that it would make 10 films in three months.

Regal made a deal with actors and directors to pay them a percentage of any money from the sale of films to television. When Regal did not make a similar deal with writers, however, the Screen Writers Guild forbade its members from working for Lippert, and Regal stopped making films.

In 1960, Lippert sold 30 Regal films to television for $1 million.

=== Associated Producers Incorporated ===
In October 1958 a new company was formed by Lippert, called Associated Producers Incorporated (API), to make low-budget films for Fox at the rate of one per month, starting with Alaska Highway. The company was headed by George Warren, formerly a production cost controller for MGM, with William Magginetti as production supervisor and Harry Spaulding as story editor. Lippert was described as being "associated" with the company.(API having similar initials to exploitation specialist American International Pictures may have been coincidental).

Harry Spalding and Maury Dexter were the driving forces of API. Lippert explained, "We use hack writers or new writers, and beat-up faces or new faces. No, I don't direct any of them. I wouldn't be a director for anything. No wonder they all have ulcers." Lippert had indeed directed a Lippert production -- once -- in 1948; the film was the outdoor adventure Last of the Wild Horses.

In October 1959, Lippert said making "little Bs" for $100,000 was no longer as lucrative because "it is now in the same category as the short TV feature which people can see for free." He persuaded Fox to start financing his films up to $300,000 and a shooting schedule of around 15 days starting with The Sad Horse.

"I have an angle on everything", he said in 1960, adding that he found it profitable to focus on small towns and country areas. "There's a lot of money in sticks." In December 1960 he said he had been "bumped" off The Canadians due to problems with Canadian governmental loan negotiator Wilfred Griffin Eady.

In 1962, Lippert criticized Hollywood for the "slow suicide" in moviegoing, blaming involvement of New York bankers in creative matters, inflated overhead, union featherbedding, and obsolete theaters. "The economics of this business have gone cockeyed. The total gross of pictures has dropped from 20-30% and the costs have doubled. It's nuts." By this stage, he estimated that he had made "about 300 films" including 100 for Fox in five years. "One year, I made 26, more than the rest of the studios."

"Most Bs cost $100,000 or $200,000", he said. "We shoot them in six or seven days. There's hardly any reshooting. Unless something is glaringly wrong, we let 'em go. What the hell, people don't care. They want to be entertained. I've heard people coming out of my theaters after seeing a double bill that featured a big production, 'Everybody died' or 'How that girl suffered. Thank God for the little picture'."

Lippert said that he wanted to make more Westerns "because they're cheap" but didn't because "television had saturated the market."

Faced with increasing production costs in Hollywood, Lippert announced in 1962 that he would be making films in England, Italy (The Last Man on Earth), and the Philippines. Fox ended the relationship with Regal/API when its own production schedule had declined and it didn't have enough "A" features to maintain double-feature programs.

=== Later career ===
In March 1966, Fox announced that Lippert would return to film production with Country Music.

Lippert's association with Fox ended after 250 films with The Last Shot You Hear, which began filming in 1967 but wasn't released until 1969.

After stepping away from film production, Lippert concentrated on exhibition. He doubled his chain of theaters from 70 to 139 and managed them until his death.

== Personal life ==
In 1926, he married Ruth Robinson and they remained married until his death. He has a son, Robert L. Lippert Jr., and a daughter, Judith Ann. His son followed his father into producing and also helped manage the theater chain. Maury Dexter says Lippert had a mistress, Margia Dean, who would be cast in the company's films at Lippert's insistence.

== Death ==
Robert L. Lippert died of a heart attack, his second, at home in Alameda, California on November 16, 1976. His cremated remains were interred at the Woodlawn Memorial Park Cemetery in Colma, California.

== Select filmography ==
=== Produced by Action Pictures, distributed by Screen Guild Productions ===
- Wildfire: The Story of a Horse (1945) – starring Bob Steele, produced by William David, directed by Robert Emmett Tansey
- Northwest Trail (1945) – starring Bob Steele, produced by William David, directed by Derwin Abrahams
- God's Country (1946) – starring Bob Steele, produced by William David, directed by Robert Emmett Tansey

=== Produced by Affiliated Productions, distributed by Screen Guild Productions ===
- Renegade Girl (1946) – starring Ann Savage, directed by William Berke
- Rolling Home (1946) – starring Jean Parker and Russell Hayden, directed by William Berke

=== Produced by Golden Gate Pictures, distributed by Screen Guild Productions ===
- 'Neath Canadian Skies (1946) – produced by William David, directed by B. Reeves Eason from a story by James Oliver Curwood
- North of the Border (1946) – produced by William David, directed by B. Reeves Eason from a story by James Oliver Curwood
- Flight to Nowhere (1946) – with Alan Curtis and Evelyn Ankers, produced by William David, directed by William Rowland
- My Dog Shep (1946) – starring Flame, produced by William David, directed by Ford Beebe
- Death Valley (1946) – starring Robert Lowery, produced by William David, directed by Lew Landers
- Scared to Death (1947) – starring Bela Lugosi, produced by William David, directed by Christy Cabanne

=== Produced by Edward F. Finney Productions, distributed by Screen Guild Productions ===
- Queen of the Amazons (1947) – starring Patricia Morison, written by Roger Merton, directed by Edward Finney
- The Prairie (1947) – starring Lenore Aubert, Based on a story by James Fenimore Cooper, written by Arthur St. Claire (screenplay), directed by Frank Wisbar

=== Produced by Somerset Pictures, distributed by Screen Guild Productions ===
- Road to the Big House (1947) – starring John Shelton, written by Aubrey Wisberg, directed by Walter Colmes
- The Burning Cross (1947) – with Hank Daniels, written by Aubrey Wisberg, directed by Walter Colmes

=== Produced by Jack Schwarz Productions, distributed by Screen Guild Productions ===
- Buffalo Bill Rides Again (April 19, 1947) – starring Richard Arlen, produced by Jack Schwarz, directed by Bernard B. Ray
- Hollywood Barn Dance (June 21, 1947) – starring a country-music cast, produced by Jack Schwarz, directed by Bernard B. Ray

=== Distributed only by Screen Guild Productions ===
- Trail of the Mounties (1947) – Bali Pictures – starring Russell Hayden and Jennifer Holt, directed by Howard Bretherton
- Bush Pilot (1947) – Dominion Pictures, a Canadian company – starring Jack La Rue
- Boy! What a Girl! (1947) – Herald Pictures – race film musical featuring Tim Moore
- Bells of San Fernando (1947) – starring Donald Woods, Hillcrest Productions
- Dragnet (1947) (aka Dark Bullet and A Shot in the Dark) starring Henry Wilcoxon – Fortune Films
- Killer Dill (1947) – starring Stuart Erwin, Max M. King Productions, Nivel Pictures Corporation
- Harpoon (1948) – produced by Danches Bros. Productions
- S.O.S. Submarine (1948) – 1941 Italian film released in America in 1948, aka Men on the Sea Floor
- Miracle in Harlem (1948) – featuring Sheila Guyse
- The Mozart Story (1948) – Austrian film from Patrician Pictures
- Tromba (1949), released in 1952 as Tromba the Tiger Man
- Omoo-Omoo the Shark God (June 10, 1949) – with Ron Randell, Esla Pictures – directed by Leon Leonard
- Call of the Forest (1949) – starring Robert Lowery and Ken Curtis, Adventure Pictures, directed by John F. Link

=== Reissues ===
Hopalong Cassidy Westerns

Reissued in 1946:

- Hopalong Rides Again (1937)
- Rustlers' Valley (1937)
- North of the Rio Grande (1937)
- Hills of Old Wyoming (1937)
- Borderland (1937)
- Trail Dust (1936)
- Hopalong Cassidy Returns (1936)
- Hop-Along Cassidy (1935)
- Secret of the Wastelands (1941)
- Outlaws of the Desert (1941)
- Twilight on the Trail (1941)
- Riders of the Timberline (1941)
- Stick to Your Guns (1941)
- Wide Open Town (1941)
- Pirates on Horseback (1941)
- Border Vigilantes (1941)
- In Old Colorado (1941)
- Three Men from Texas (1940)

Reissued in 1947:

- Bar 20 Justice (1938)
- Heart of Arizona (1938)
- Cassidy of Bar 20 (1938)
- Partners of the Plains (1938)
- Texas Trail (1937)
- The Frontiersmen (1938)

Reissued in 1948:

- Stagecoach War (1940)
- Hidden Gold (1940)
- Santa Fe Marshal (1940)
- Law of the Pampas (1939)
- Range War (1939)
- Renegade Trail (1939)
- Sunset Trail (1938)
- In Old Mexico (1938)
- Pride of the West (1938)

Other reissues:

Reissued in 1946:

- Red Salute (1935)

Reissued in 1948:

- King of the Turf (1939)
- Flirting with Fate (1938)
- The Duke of West Point (1938)
- Forbidden Music (1936)
- Midnight (1934)
- That's My Boy (1932)
- Miss Annie Rooney (1942)

Reissued in 1950:

- March of the Wooden Soldiers (1934)

Reissued in 1952:

- Captain Kidd (1945)
- The Macomber Affair (1947)

Reissued in 1953:

- The Iron Mask (1929)
- Mr. Robinson Crusoe (1932)
- Chu Chin Chow (1934)

=== Featurettes ===
- The Case of the Baby Sitter (1947) – produced by Carl Hittleman for Screen Art Pictures Corp.
- The Hat Box Mystery (1947) – produced by Hittleman
- Bandit Island (1953) – 3-D short
- A Day in the Country (March 13, 1953) – 3-D short
- College Capers (1953) – 3-D short

=== Produced by Ron Ormond for Western Adventure Productions, distributed by Screen Guild Productions ===
- Dead Man's Gold (1948)
- Mark of the Lash (1948)
- Frontier Revenge (1948)
- Son of a Bad Man (1949)
- Son of Billy the Kid (1949)
- Outlaw Country (1949)

=== Distributed by Screen Guild and produced by Lippert Productions ===
- Shoot to Kill (1947) – with Robert Kent, produced and directed by William Berke
- Jungle Goddess (1948) – starring Ralph Byrd and George Reeves, written by Jo Pagano, produced by William Stephens, directed by Lewis D. Collins
- Thunder in the Pines (1948) – starring Ralph Byrd and George Reeves, produced by William Stephens, directed by Robert Edwards
- Shep Comes Home (1948) – produced by Ron Ormond, written and directed by Ford Beebe
- Highway 13 (1948) produced by William Stephens, directed by William Berke
- Black Stallion (1948) aka The Return of Wildfire – produced by Carl Hittleman, directed by Ray Taylor
- Last of the Wild Horses (1948) – directed by Robert Lippert (the only film he directed)
- Arson, Inc. (1949) – starring Robert Lowery, directed by William Berke
- Deputy Marshal (1949) – starring Jon Hall and Frances Langford, directed by William Berke
- Red Desert (1949) aka Texas Manhunt – directed by Ford Beebe
- Treasure of Monte Cristo (1949) – directed by William Berke
- Sky Liner (1949) – produced by William Stephens, directed by William Berke
- I Shot Jesse James (1949) – produced by Carl Hittleman, written and directed by Sam Fuller
- Grand Canyon (1949) – produced by Carl Hittleman, directed by Paul Landres
- Rimfire (1949) – produced by Ron Ormond, directed by B. Reeves Eason
- Texas Manhunt (1949) aka Red Desert – starring Don Barry, directed by Ford Beebe
- Apache Chief (1949) – directed by Frank McDonald
- Ringside (1949) – starring Don "Red" Barry directed by Frank McDonald
- Curfew Breakers (1957) – directed by Alex Wells

=== Produced and distributed by Lippert Productions ===
- Hollywood Varieties (vaudeville revue) (January 15, 1950)
- Radar Secret Service (January 28, 1950)
- Everybody's Dancin' (March 31, 1950) – (country-music revue) Nunes-Cooley Productions
- Operation Haylift (May 5, 1950) – directed by William Berke, Produced by Joe Sawyer, written by Dean Riesner & Joe Sawyer
- Motor Patrol (May 12, 1950) – directed by Sam Newfield
- Rocketship X-M (May 26, 1950)
- The Return of Jesse James (September 8, 1950)
- Border Rangers (October 6, 1950)
- Holiday Rhythm (October 13, 1950)
- Bandit Queen (December 22, 1950) – produced and directed by William Berke
- Kentucky Jubilee (May 18, 1951)
- Unknown World (October 26, 1951)
- Superman and the Mole-Men with George Reeves (pilot film for the Adventures of Superman TV series) (November 23, 1951)
- Stronghold (February 15, 1952) – Tom Productions
- The Jungle (August 1, 1952) aka Kaadu
- The Tall Texan (February 13, 1953)
- The Great Jesse James Raid (July 17, 1953)
- Fangs of the Wild (April 2, 1954)
- The Cowboy (May 28, 1954) (documentary)
- Thunder Pass (September 20, 1954)

=== Western series ===
starring James Ellison and Russell Hayden, all produced by Ron Ormond and directed by Thomas Carr

- Hostile Country (March 24, 1950)
- Marshal of Heldorado (April 21, 1950)
- Colorado Ranger (May 12, 1950)
- West of the Brazos (June 2, 1950)
- Crooked River (June 9, 1950)
- Fast on the Draw (June 30, 1950)

=== Other ===
- Little Big Horn (1951) aka The Fighting Seventh – produced by Bali Productions – written and directed by Charles Marquis Warren (first film as director), produced by Carl Hittleman
- G.I. Jane (1951) – with Jean Porter and Tom Neal, produced by Murray Lerner for Murray Productions
- F.B.I. Girl (1951) – produced by Jegar Productions
- Navajo (1952) (documentary) – Hall Bartlett Productions
- Outlaw Women (1952) – Ron Ormond Productions
- Loan Shark (1952) – Encore Productions
- Hellgate (1952) – Commander Films
- Mr. Walkie Talkie (1952) – Rockingham Productions
- White Goddess (1953) – Arrow Productions – episodes of Ramar of the Jungle
- Eyes of the Jungle (1953) aka Destination Danger – episodes of Ramar of the Jungle
- Project Moon Base (1953) – Galaxy Pictures Inc.
- Hollywood Thrill-Makers (1954) – Kosloff
- Monster from the Ocean Floor (1954) – Palo Alto Productions (Roger Corman)
- Thunder Over Sangoland (1955) – episodes of Ramar of the Jungle
- Phantom of the Jungle (1955) – episodes of Ramar of the Jungle
- King Dinosaur (1955) – Zimgor
- Air Strike (1955) – starring Richard Denning and Gloria Jean, produced, directed, and written by Cy Roth

=== Produced by Earle Lyon and Richard Bartlett's L&B Productions, released by Lippert Pictures ===
- Silent Raiders (1954) – Co-Written, directed by and starring Richard Bartlett and Earle Lyon
- The Silver Star (1955) – Co-written, directed by and co-starring Richard Bartlett and Earle Lyon
- The Lonesome Trail (1955) – Co-Written and directed by Richard Bartlett and Earle Lyon

=== Produced by Don Barry Productions, released by Lippert Pictures ===
- The Dalton Gang (October 21, 1949)
- Square Dance Jubilee (November 11, 1949)
- Tough Assignment (November 15, 1949)
- I Shot Billy the Kid (July 27, 1950)
- Frank James Rides Again (August 12, 1950) aka Gunfire
- Train to Tombstone (September 16, 1950)

=== Produced by Sigmund Neufeld Productions ===
- Western Pacific Agent (1950)
- Hi-Jacked (1950)
- Three Desperate Men (1951)
- Fingerprints Don't Lie (1951)
- Mask of the Dragon (1951)
- Stop That Cab (1951)
- Danger Zone (1951)
- Roaring City (1951)
- Pier 23 (1951)
- Savage Drums (1951)
- Yes Sir, Mr. Bones (1951)
- Varieties on Parade (1951)
- Lost Continent (1951)
- Leave It to the Marines (1951)
- Sky High (1951)
- Sins of Jezebel (1953)

=== Produced by Deputy Corporation ===
- The Baron of Arizona (Mar 1950) – written by Sam Fuller and Homer Croy, produced by Carl Hittleman, and directed by Sam Fuller
- The Steel Helmet (Feb 1951) – written, produced and directed by Sam Fuller

=== Produced by R and L Productions (Hal Roach, Jr. and Lippert) ===
- Tales of Robin Hood (1951)
- As You Were (1952)

=== Acquired from international sources ===
- Johnny the Giant Killer (1950, released 1953) – France
- Highly Dangerous aka Time Running Out (1950)
- The Fighting Men (1950) – Italy
- The Siege (1950) – Spain
- Valley of Eagles (1951) – produced by Independent Sovereign Films
- The Adventurers (1951) – produced by Mayflower
- Pirate Submarine (1952) – France
- Ghost Ship (1952) – Vernon Sewell Productions
- The Queen of Sheba (1952) – Oro Films – Italy
- Secret People (1952) – Ealing Productions
- I'll Get You (1952) aka Escape Route – Banner Films
- Bachelor in Paris (1952) – Roger Proudlock Productions
- Women of Twilight (1952) aka Twilight Women – Angel Productions
- Norman Conquest (1953) aka Park Plaza 605 – B & A Productions
- Undercover Agent (1953) aka Counterspy – Abtcon Pictures
- The Shadow Man (1953) aka Street of Shadow – William Nassour Productions
- The Man from Cairo (1953) – Michaeldavid Productions
- Cosh Boy (1953) aka The Slasher – Romulus Productions
- The Limping Man (1953) – Banner Films Ltd.
- White Fire (1953) aka Three Steps to the Gallows – Tempean Films
- River Beat (1954) – Insignia Films
- They Were So Young (1954) – Coronoa
- Dangerous Voyage (1954) – Merton Park Studios
- The Black Pirates (1954) – El Salvador
- Simba (1955) – Group Film
- The Curious Adventures of Mr. Wonderbird (1952, released 1957) – Clarge Distributors (France)

=== H-N Productions, distributed by Lippert Pictures ===
- For Men Only (Jan 1952) – produced and directed by Paul Henreid

=== Co-productions with Hammer Films ===
- There is No Escape (1949) aka The Dark Road
- The Last Page (1952) aka Man Bait
- Wings of Danger (1952) aka Dead on Course
- Stolen Face (1952)
- Lady in the Fog (1952) aka Scotland Yard Inspector
- Gambler and the Lady (1952)
- Bad Blonde (1953)
- 36 Hours (1953) aka Terror Street
- Face the Music (1953) aka The Black Glove
- Spaceways (1953)
- Blackout (1954) aka Murder by Proxy
- The House Across the Lake (1954) aka Heat Wave
- A Stranger Came Home (1954) aka The Unholy Four
- Mask of Dust (1954) aka Race for Life
- Third Party Risk (1954) aka The Big Deadly Game
- Five Days (1954) aka Paid to Kill
- Life with the Lyons (1954) aka Family Affair
- The Glass Cage (1955) aka The Glass Tomb
- The Quatermass Xperiment (1955)

=== Produced by Associated Film Releasing Corp., Intercontinental Pictures, Inc., distributed by Fox ===
- Massacre (June 1956) – written by D.D. Beauchamp, produced by Robert L. Lippert Jr, directed by Louis King

=== Produced by Lippert's Regal Films, distributed by 20th Century Fox ===
- The Desperados Are in Town (Nov 1956) – directed by Kurt Neumann
- Stagecoach to Fury (Dec 1956) – produced by Earl Lyon, directed by William Claxton – nominated for an Oscar
- The Women of Pitcairn Island (Dec 1956) – written by Aubrey Wisberg, directed by Jean Yarbrough
- The Black Whip (Dec 1956) – written by Orville Hampton, produced bu Robert Kraushaar, directed by Charles Marquis Warren
- The Quiet Gun (Jan 1957) aka Fury at Rock River – written and produced by Earle Lyon, directed by William F Claxton
- The Storm Rider (Mar 1957) – written and directed by Edward Bernds, produced by Bernard Glasser
- She Devil (April 1957) – written, produced and directed by Kurt Neumann
- Kronos (April 1957) – produced and directed by Kurt Neumann
- Badlands of Montana (May 1957) – written, produced and directed by Daniel B. Ullman
- Lure of the Swamp (May 1957) – directed by Hubert Cornfield
- The Abductors (Jul 1957) – written and produced by Ray Wander, directed by Andrew McLaglen
- Apache Warrior (July 1957) – directed by Elmo Williams, produced by Plato A. Skouras, written by Carroll Young, Kurt Neumann & Eric Norden
- God Is My Partner (1957) – starring Walter Brennan, directed by William F. Claxton, produced by Sam Hersh
- Hell on Devil's Island (Aug 1957) – written by Steven Ritch, produced by Leon Chooluck and Laurence Stewart, directed by Christian Nyby
- Under Fire (Sept 1957) – written by James Landis, produced by Plato A. Skouras, directed by James B. Clark
- Rockabilly Baby (Oct 1957) – produced and directed by William Claxton
- Ghost Diver (Oct 1957) – written and directed by Richard Einfeld and Merrill G. White
- Young and Dangerous (Oct 1957) – produced and directed by William Claxton
- Plunder Road (Dec 1957) – directed by Hubert Cornfield
- Escape from Red Rock (Dec 1957) – written and directed by Edward Bernds, produced by Bernard Glasser
- Diamond Safari (Feb 1958) – co produced with Scheslinger Org in South Africa – producer and directed by Gerald Mayer
- Ambush at Cimarron Pass (Feb 1958) – early role for Clint Eastwood, directed by Jodie Copelan, produced by Herbert E. Mendelson, written by John K. Butler and Richard G. Taylor
- Showdown at Boot Hill (May 1958) – starring Charles Bronson, directed by Gene Fowler Jr., produced by Harold E. Knox, written by Louis Vittes
- Thundering Jets (May 1958) – directed by Helmut Dantine, produced by Jack Leewood, written by James Landis
- Wolf Dog (July 1958) – produced and directed by Sam Newfield, written by Louis Stevens
- Sierra Baron (July 1958) – written by Houston Brance, produced by Plato Skouras, directed by James B Clark
- Space Master X-7 (Jul 1958) – Directed by Edward Bernds, produced by Bernard Glasser, written by George Worthing Yates and Daniel Mainwaring
- Gang War (July 1958) – starring Charles Bronson, written by Louis Vittes, directed by Gene Fowler Jr
- Villa!! (Oct 1958) – written by Louis Vittes, produced by Plato Skouras, directed by James B Clark
- Frontier Gun (Dec 1958) – Directed by Paul Landres, Produced by Richard E. Lyons, written by Stephen Kandel
- Lone Texan (March 1959) – starring Willard Parker written by James Landis, produced by Jack Leewood, directed by Paul Landres

=== Co-productions between Regal Films & Emirau Productions, distributed by Fox ===
- The Unknown Terror (1957)
- Copper Sky (1957)
- Ride a Violent Mile (Nov 1957) – story & directed by Charles Marquis Warren
- Back from the Dead (1957)
- Desert Hell (1958)
- Cattle Empire (1958)
- Blood Arrow (1958)

=== Distributed by 20th Century-Fox, produced as Regal but released as 20th Century-Fox ===
- The Fly (Aug 1958) – written by James Clavell, produced and directed by Kurt Neumann

=== Produced by Lippert's Associated Producers Incorporated, distributed by 20th Century Fox ===
- Alaska Passage (Feb 1959) – written and directed by Edward Bernds produced by Bernard Glasser
- The Little Savage (March 1959) – director Byron Haskin, producer Jack Leewood, writer Eric Norden
- The Sad Horse (March 1959) – director James B. Clark, producer Richard E. Lyons, writer Charles Hoffman
- The Miracle of the Hills (July 1959) – written by Charles Hoffman, directed by Paul Landres
- Return of the Fly (July 1959) – written and directed by Edward Bernds, produced by Bernard Glasser
- The Alligator People (July 1959) – directed by Roy Del Ruth, produced by Jack Leewood, written by Orville H. Hampton
- Five Gates to Hell (Sept 1959) – written, produced and directed by James Clavell
- The Oregon Trail (Sept 1959) – written by Louis Vittes, produced by Richard Einfelfd, directed by Gene Fowler Jr
- Blood and Steel (Dec 1959) – produced by Gene Corman, directed by Bernard L. Kowalski
- Here Come the Jets (Jun 1959) – director Gene Fowler, Jr., producer Richard Einfeld, writer Louis Vittes
- The Rookie (Dec 1959) – starring Tom Noonan – directed by George O'Hanlon
- The 3rd Voice (Jan 1960) – written & directed by Hugh Cornfeld, produced by Maury Dexter
- Valley of the Redwoods (May 1960) – director William Witney, producer Gene Corman, written by Leo Gordon & Daniel Madison
- Young Jesse James (Aug 1960) – starring Ray Strickland & Willard Parker, written by Orvill Hampton, produced by Jack Leewood, directed by William F Claxton
- Walk Tall (Sept 1960) – written by Joseph Fritz.produced & directed by Maury Dexter
- Desire in the Dust (Oct 1960) – starring Raymond Burr, produced and directed by William F Claxton
- Freckles (Dec 1960) – Directed by Andrew McLaglen, written and produced by Harry Spalding
- The Secret of the Purple Reef (Dec 1960) – produced by Gene Corman, directed by William Witney
- Tess of the Storm Country (Dec 1960) – Directed by Paul Guilfoyle, produced by Everett Chambers, written by Charles Lang & Rupert Hughes
- Twelve Hours to Kill (April 1960) – directed by Edward L. Cahn, produced by John Healy
- 13 Fighting Men (April 1960) – directed by Harry W. Gerstad, Produced by Jack Leewood, Screenplay by Robert Hamner & Jack W. Thomas
- The Long Rope (Feb 1961) – written by Robert Hamner, produced by Margia Dean directed by William Witney
- Sniper's Ridge (Feb 1961) – produced and directed by John A. Bushelman, written by Tom Maruzzi
- The Canadians (Mar 1961) – written and directed by Burt Kennedy (his directorial debut)
- The Little Shepherd of Kingdom Come (April 1961) – produced by Maury Dexter, directed by Andrew McLaglen
- The Silent Call (May 1961) – directed by John A. Bushelman, produced by Leonard A. Schwartz, written by Tom Maruzzi – last appearance of Gail Russell
- Misty (June 1961) – starring David Ladd, directed by James Clark, written by Ted Sherdeman
- 20,000 Eyes (Jun 1961) – written by Jack Thomas, produced & directed by Jack Leewood
- Battle at Bloody Beach (Jun 1961) – starring Audie Murphy, written and produced by Richard Maibaum, directed by Herbert Coleman
- The Big Show (Jul 1961) – starring Esther Williams and Cliff Robertson – written by Ted Sherdeman, directed by James B. Clark, produced by Clark and Sherdeman
- 7 Women from Hell (Oct 1961) – Directed by Robert D. Webb, Produced by Harry Spalding, Written by Jesse Lasky Jr
- The Two Little Bears (Nov 1961) – written and produced by George W George, directed by Randall Hood
- The Purple Hills (Nov 1961) – produced and directed by Maury Dexter
- Hand of Death (Mar 1962) – produced and written by Eugene Ling, directed by Gene Nelson
- The Broken Land (April 1962) – starring Jack Nicholson, directed by John A. Bushelman, produced by Leonard A. Schwartz, written by Edward J. Lakso
- The Cabinet of Caligari (May 1962) – written by Robert Bloch, produced and directed by Robert Kay
- Womanhunt (June 1962) – written by Harry Spalding, produced and directed by Maury Dexter
- Air Patrol (Jul 1962) – written by Harry Spalding, produced and directed by Maury Dexter
- The Firebrand (Aug 1962) – written by Harry Spalding, produced and directed by Maury Dexter
- Young Guns of Texas (Nov 1962) – written by Harry Spalding, produced and directed by Maury Dexter
- The Day Mars Invaded Earth (Feb 1963) – written by Harry Spalding, produced and directed by Maury Dexter
- House of the Damned (Mar 1963) – written by Harry Spalding, produced and directed by Maury Dexter
- Police Nurse (May 1963) – written by Harry Spalding, produced and directed by Maury Dexter
- Harbor Lights (Jul 1963) – written by Harry Spalding, produced and directed by Maury Dexter
- The Young Swingers (Sept 1963) – written by Harry Spalding, produced and directed by Maury Dexter
- Thunder Island (Sept 1963) – written by Jack Nicholson and Don Devlin, produced & directed by Jack Leewood
- Surf Party (Jan 1964) – written by Harry Spalding, produced and directed by Maury Dexter
- Felicia (1964)- written & directed by David E. Durston, produced by Steve Bono

=== Produced by Princess Production, released by Fox ===
- Murder Inc (Jun 1960) – directed by Burt Balaban & Stuart Rosenberg, produced by Balaban

=== Produced by Associated Producers but released as a 20th Century-Fox production, released by Fox ===
- A Dog in Flanders (Mar 1959) – director James B. Clark, producer Robert B. Radnitz, writer Ted Sherdeman
- It Happened in Athens (June 1962) – starring Jayne Mansfield directed by Andrew Marton

=== Produced by Associated Producers, released in US by American International Pictures ===
- The Last Man on Earth (Mar 1964) – starring Vincent Price, directed by Ubaldo Ragona and Sidney Salkow

=== Produced by Capri Production, distributed by 20th Century-Fox ===
- The High Powered Rifle (Sept 1960) – written by Joseph Fritz, produced and directed by Maury Dexter

=== Produced by Lippert Films, distributed by 20th Century-Fox (in England) ===
- Witchcraft (Mar 1964) – starring Lon Chaney Jr, written by Harry Spalding, produced by Jack Parsons, directed by Don Sharp
- The Horror of It All (Aug 1964) – written by Ray Russell, directed by Terence Fisher
- Night Train to Paris (Sept 1964) – written by Harry Spalding, produced by Jack Parsons, directed by Robert Douglas
- The Earth Dies Screaming (Oct 1964) – written by Harry Spalding, produced by Jack Parsons, directed by Terence Fisher
- Raiders from Beneath the Sea (Dec 1964) – written by Harry Spalding, produced and directed by Maury Dexter
- Curse of the Fly (May 1965) – written by Harry Spalding, produced by Jack Parsons, directed by Don Sharp
- Wild on the Beach (Aug 1965) – written by Harry Spalding, produced & directed by Maury Dexter
- Spaceflight IC-1: An Adventure in Space (Oct 1965) – written by Harry Spalding, produced by Jack Parsons, directed by Bernard Knowles
- The Return of Mr. Moto (Oct 1965) – produced by Jack Parsons, directed by Edward Morris
- The Murder Game (Dec 1965) – written by Harry Spalding, Iving Yergin, produced by Jack Parsons, directed by Sidney Salkow
- The Last Shot You Hear (May 1969) – produced by Jack Parsons, directed by Gordon Hessler

=== Produced by Lippert Films, distributed by Feature Film Corp, made in Philippines ===
- Walls of Hell (1964) – Hemisphere Pictures – directed by Eddie Romero
- Moro Witch Doctor (1964) – Hemisphere Pictures, Associated Producers – produced & directed by Eddie Romero
- Back Door to Hell (1964) – produced by Fred Roos, directed by Monte Hellman
- Flight to Fury (1964) – written by Jack Nicholson, produced by Fred Roos, directed by Monte Hellman
- Cordillera (1965) – adaptation of Flight to Fury, directed by Eddie Romero

=== Produced by Lippert Films, distributed by 20th Century-Fox (made in US) ===
- That Tennessee Beat (1966) – produced and directed by Richard Brill

=== Produced by Jack Parsons-Neil McCallum Productions, filmed in England, released by Paramount ===
- Walk a Tightrope (1964) – produced by Jack Parsons, directed by Frank Nesbitt

=== Produced by Jack Parsons-Neil McCallum Productions, filmed in England, released by Fox ===
- The Eyes of Annie Jones (May 1964) – written by Louis Vittes, produced by Jack Parsons, directed by Reginald LeBorg

=== Produced by Parroch-McCallum with API, distributed by Paramount, filmed in England ===
- Troubled Waters (1964) – Parroch-McCallum – starring Tab Hunter, produced by Lippert and Jack Parsons – released by Fox
- The Woman Who Wouldn't Die (1965) aka Catacombs – written by Daniel Mainwaring, produced by Jack Parsons, directed by Gordon Hessler – released by Warners

=== Other Lippert movies distributed by 20th Century-Fox ===
- The Yellow Canary (1963) – Cooga Mooga Productions – starring Pat Boone, written by Rod Serling, produced by Maury Dexter, directed by Buzz Kulik

== See also ==
- Alameda Theatre (Alameda, California)
- Tiffany Theater
