= Road to the Big House =

1947 film

- Film poster
- Directed by: Walter Colmes
- Written by: Aubrey Wisberg
- Based on: story "The Dark Road" by Wisberg
- Produced by: executive Robert L. Lippert
- Starring: John Shelton
- Production company: Somerset Productions
- Distributed by: Screen Guild Productions
- Release date: December 13, 1947
- Running time: 74 minutes
- Country: United States
- Language: English

Road to the Big House is a 1947 American crime drama film directed by Walter Colmes. It was based on a script by Aubrey Wisberg.

It was also known as The Dark Road.

== Cast ==
- John Shelton as Eddie Clark
- Ann Doran as Agnes Clark
- Guinn "Big Boy" Williams as Butch McQuinn

== Production ==
The film was made by a new company, Somerset Pictures, established in 1947 by Walter Combes, Solly Levenstn and Jake Milstein. It followed their first film The Burning Cross.

Somerset announced their third film would be about teachers' salaries. But it appears to have not been made.
