= Holiday Rhythm =

1950 film

- Directed by: Jack Scholl
- Written by: Lee Wainer
- Produced by: Irving Kay; Jack Leewood
- Starring: Mary Beth Hughes; David Street; Wally Vernon
- Cinematography: Benjamin H. Kline
- Edited by: Louis Hesse
- Music by: Bert Shefter
- Production company: Lippert Pictures
- Distributed by: Lippert Pictures
- Release date: October 13, 1950
- Country: United States
- Language: English
- Budget: $45,000

Holiday Rhythm is a 1950 American musical film directed by Jack Scholl and starring Mary Beth Hughes, David Street and Wally Vernon. It was released by the poverty row studio Lippert Pictures.

== Cast ==
- Mary Beth Hughes as Alice
- David Street as Larry Carter
- Wally Vernon as Klaxon
- Tex Ritter as Tex Ritter
- Alan Harris as Mr. Superdyne
- Donald MacBride as Earl E. Byrd
- Chuy Reyes as Mambo Orchestra Leader
- Ike Carpenter as Specialty Act
- Nappy Lamare as Nappy LaMare
- George Arnold as Specialty Act
- Sid Melton as Sid Melton
- The Cass County Boys as Singing Trio
- Bert Dodson as Bert – Cass County Boys
- Fred S. Martin as Fred – Cass County Boys
- Jerry Scoggins as Jerry – Cass County Boys
- Tommy Noonan as Surgeon
- Bobby Chang as Specialty Act
- Peter Marshall as Orderly
- Regina Day as Dancer
- Glen Turnbull as Irish Dancer
- Vera Lee as Dancer
- Tommy Ladd as Dancer

== Production ==
The film was shot in three days at a cost of $45,000.

== Bibliography ==
- Fetrow, Alan G. Feature Films, 1950–1959: A United States Filmography. McFarland, 1999.
