= Pier 23 =

1951 Film directed by William A. Berke

- Directed by: William Berke
- Screenplay by: Julian Harmon; Victor West
- Story by: Herbert Margolis; Louis Morheim
- Produced by: William Berke; Jack Leewood
- Starring: Hugh Beaumont; Ann Savage; Edward Brophy; Richard Travis; David Bruce; Mike Mazurki; Margia Dean; Joy Lansing
- Cinematography: Jack Greenhalgh
- Edited by: Carl Pierson; Harry Reynolds
- Music by: Bert Shefter
- Production company: Spartan Productions
- Distributed by: Lippert Pictures
- Release date: May 11, 1951
- Running time: 58 minutes
- Country: United States
- Language: English

Pier 23 is a 1951 American crime film directed by William Berke and starring Hugh Beaumont, Ann Savage and Edward Brophy. It was distributed by the independent Lippert Pictures as a second feature intended for television as well as the cinema.

The film is closely related to the 1951 film Roaring City, which was filmed simultaneously with the same director, producers and cast, and with similar opening sequences. The two films were released at the same time, both as second features. Although Lippert Pictures announced before production that the project originally titled Pier 23 was to be retitled as Roaring City, the films are separate and have different overall plots.

== Plot ==
Denny O'Brien runs a boat shop on San Francisco's Pier 23 and moonlights as a private detective. A priest hires him to locate an Alcatraz escapee in hopes of getting him to surrender, but instead Denny is met by an impostor. The next day, a wrestling referee hires him to pick up a payoff for looking the other way in a fixed match but is killed before O'Brien can deliver the money.

== Cast ==
- Hugh Beaumont as Dennis O'Brien
- Ann Savage as Ann Harmon
- Edward Brophy as Prof. Shicker
- Mike Mazurki as Ape Danowski
- Richard Travis as Police Inspector Lt. Bruger
- Margia Dean as Flo Klingle
- David Bruce as Charles Giffen
- Raymond Greenleaf as Father Donovan
- Eve Miller as Norma Harmon
- Harry Hayden as Dr. Earl J. Tomkins
- Joy Lansing as The Cocktail Waitress
- Peter Mamakos as Nick Garrison
- Chris Drake as Mike Greeley
- John Indrisano as Mushy Cavelli
- Bill Varga as Willie Klingle
- Richard Monahan as Henry, the bartender
- Charles Wagenheim as Lefty, the policy Man
- Jack Chefe as Waiter
- Heinie Conklin as Counter Man
- Jack Gordon as Wrestling Match Spectator
- Kit Guard as Drunk at Wrestling Match
- Barry Norton as Waiter
- Cosmo Sardo as Club patron
- Max Wagner as Bar Patron

== See also ==
- Danger Zone (1951)
- Roaring City (1951)
