= Lost Continent (1951 film) =

1951 film by Sam Newfield

- Theatrical release poster
- Directed by: Sam Newfield
- Written by: Orville H. Hampton; Richard H. Landau; Carroll Young (story)
- Produced by: Jack Leewood; Robert L. Lippert; Sigmund Neufeld
- Starring: Cesar Romero; Hillary Brooke; Chick Chandler; Sid Melton; Hugh Beaumont; John Hoyt
- Cinematography: Jack Greenhalgh
- Edited by: Philip Cahn
- Music by: Paul Dunlap
- Distributed by: Lippert Pictures
- Release date: August 17, 1951 (North America)
- Running time: 83 minutes
- Country: United States
- Language: English

Lost Continent is a 1951 American black-and-white science fiction film drama produced by Jack Leewood, Robert L. Lippert and Sigmund Neufeld, directed by Sam Newfield (Neufeld's brother) and starring Cesar Romero, Hillary Brooke, Whit Bissell, Sid Melton, Hugh Beaumont and John Hoyt.

== Plot ==
Major Joe Nolan is the head of a South Pacific expedition to retrieve an atomic-powered rocket that has vanished. He is accompanied by pilot Lieutenant Danny Wilson, aircraft mechanic Sergeant William Tatlow and the three scientists who built the rocket.

Their aircraft crashes on a remote, unknown tropical island in the area where the rocket had been lost on radar. The island's only residents are a native woman and her young brother. The woman indicates that something fell from the sky, and the rocket's fiery arrival caused the rest of the native population to abandon the island.

Expedition member Stanley Briggs is accidentally killed on the steep ascent up the escarpment. After long stretches of rock climbing, the expedition emerges from a toxic gas cloud cover. They discover a lush, prehistoric jungle inhabited by various dinosaurs and a large field of uranium, which is what disabled their electronic tracking equipment.

They encounter a Brontosaurus that attacks Robert Phillips as he retreats up a tree. Nolan and Wilson open fire, but the dinosaur's thick hide absorbs the bullets with little effect. Later that night, they establish camp. When Nolan awakes, he finds Phillips and Russian scientist Michael Rostov missing. Phillips is stuck in a large rock crevice near a Triceratops. Nolan accuses Rostov of intentionally arranging the accident, but Rostov insists that he was helping Phillips. The Triceratops nearly attacks the group, but another Triceratops appears and the two dinosaurs fight to the death.

Nolan is convinced that Rostov is evil because Rostov appeared to be able to save Briggs on their ascent but failed to do so. Rostov reveals that he is a victim of the Holocaust, in which he lost his wife and unborn child.

Wilson later shoots a Pterosaur for food near the rocket's landing site. The group discover that the rocket is surrounded by a Brontosaurus and a pair of Triceratops, but Nolan devises a strategy using their weapons that scare the dinosaurs. Rostov and Phillips retrieve the data from the rocket. With his back turned, Tatlow is gored to death by an angry Triceratops just as it is shot and killed by Nolan and Wilson. After the team finishes digging a grave, violent earthquake tremors begin and the team must hurry down the steep plateau.

The four men return to the island's flatland in time to escape the island by using an outrigger canoe. The survivors are finally able to watch from a safe distance as the island is rocked by more violent earthquakes, followed by a catastrophic eruption of the formerly dormant volcano, which ultimately destroys everything.

== Cast ==
- Cesar Romero as Maj. Joe Nolan
- Hillary Brooke as Marla Stevens
- Chick Chandler as Lt. Danny Wilson
- John Hoyt as Michael Rostov
- Acquanetta as Native girl
- Sid Melton as Sgt. William Tatlow
- Whit Bissell as Stanley Briggs
- Hugh Beaumont as Robert Phillips
- Murray Alper as Air Police Sergeant

== Production ==
The general plotline of the film strongly resembles that of Sir Arthur Conan Doyle's novel The Lost World.

With a low budget, Lost Continent was shot in just 11 days from April 13 to late April 1951 at Goldwyn Studios.

Black-and-white footage set atop the prehistoric escarpment was tinted a mint-green color on all theatrical release prints to produce an eerie, other-worldly effect. Special effects were credited to Augie Lohman, but recent research suggests that the dinosaur stop-motion animation was provided by Edward Nassour and was likely the uncredited work of Jay Baylor and sculptor Henry Lion, who worked for Nassour during that time.

== Reception ==
In a contemporary review for the Los Angeles Times, critic John L. Scott wrote: "'Lost Continent' ... differs from the usual pulp yarn about the Atomic Age in that it takes place on this planet. A favorite trick of fantastic adventure writers now is to contrast the future with the prehistoric past. This device is used in the new film. 'Lost Continent' is distinctly novelty, with a thin story serving as framework for the thrills of atom-rocket flights, battles with a brontosaurus, triceratops, pterodactyl and other bellowing monsters, and a lost island that blows up for a finale."

== Legacy ==
Lost Continent was featured in episode #208 of Mystery Science Theater 3000 (MST3K). In a host segment, Michael J. Nelson portrayed actor Hugh Beaumont as a member of the Four Horsemen of the Apocalypse. The Lost Continent episode of MST3K was released by Shout Factory as part of its Volume XVIII series DVD box set.

The scene with the dueling Triceratops was featured in "It's a Good Life", a Season 3 episode of The Twilight Zone.

== See also ==
- Journey to the Beginning of Time (1955)
- 1951 in film
- List of films featuring dinosaurs
- List of science fiction films of the 1950s
