= Richard Travis (actor) =

American actor (1913–1989)

- Born: William Benton Justice; April 17, 1913; Carlsbad, New Mexico, U.S.
- Died: July 11, 1989 (aged 76); Pacific Palisades, California, U.S.
- Occupations: Actor, real estate agent
- Years active: 1940–1966

Richard Travis (born William Benton Justice; April 17, 1913 – July 11, 1989) was an American actor in films and television.

== Early years ==
The son of William and Ella (née Spain) Justice, William Benton Justice was born in Carlsbad, New Mexico and grew up in Paragould, Arkansas. His father owned and operated a marble yard in Paragould.

Travis was a radio announcer and a sportscaster before he became an actor.

== Film ==
Travis began his Hollywood career in 1930s action films. The high point of his career was a supporting role in the 1942 film comedy The Man Who Came to Dinner (1942), playing opposite Bette Davis. He had some other fairly important roles in the early 1940s, but his career soon declined. He spent World War II with the Army Air Forces's Broadway show Winged Victory.

In 1947, he starred in the B movie Backlash, which has become something of a cult classic among film noir fans, as well as Jewels of Brandenburg, a crime drama.

== Television ==
Travis was busy in television roles in the early 1950s. He had the lead role of assistant Sheriff Rodger Barrett in the syndicated crime drama Code 3, which aired for 39 episodes in 1957.

== Real estate ==
Travis retired from acting to pursue a career in California real estate under his birth name. He founded the William Justice Company and became an officer on the Beverly Hills Realty Board.

== Military service ==
Travis served in the United States Army Air Forces.

== Partial filmography ==
- King of the Royal Mounted (1940, Serial) as Const. Hallett (uncredited)
- The Green Hornet Strikes Again! (1940, Serial) as Nightclub Headwaiter (uncredited)
- Riders of Death Valley (1941, Serial) as Joe Miller (uncredited)
- The Bride Came C.O.D. (1941) as Airline Dispatcher (uncredited)
- Dive Bomber (1941) as Commanding Officer (uncredited)
- International Squadron (1941) as Radio Operator (uncredited)
- Navy Blues (1941) as Tex (uncredited)
- The Man Who Came to Dinner (1942) as Bertram H. Jefferson
- The Big Shot (1942) as George Anderson
- The Postman Didn't Ring (1942) as Daniel Carter
- Escape from Crime (1942) as Red O'Hara
- Busses Roar (1942) as Sgt. Ryan
- Truck Busters (1943) as Casey Dorgan
- Mission to Moscow (1943) as Paul
- Spy Train (1943) as Bruce Grant
- The Last Ride (1944) as Detective Lt. Pat Harrigan
- Winged Victory (1944) as Officer Presiding at Flight School Graduation (uncredited)
- Backlash (1947) as Richard Conroy
- Jewels of Brandenburg (1947) as Johnny Vickers
- Big Town After Dark (1947) as Chuck LaRue
- Speed to Spare (1948) as Jerry McGee
- Waterfront at Midnight (1948) as 'Socks' Barstow
- The Babe Ruth Story (1948) as Reporter (uncredited)
- Out of the Storm (1948) as R.J. Ramsey
- Alaska Patrol (1949) as Tom Norman / Rattick
- Sky Liner (1949) as FBI Agent Steve Blair
- Roots in the Soil (1949)
- Operation Haylift (1950) as 'Max' Maxwell
- Motor Patrol (1950) as Detective Bill Hartley
- Lonely Heart Bandits (1950) as Aaron Hunt
- One Too Many (1950) as Bob Mason
- Charlie's Haunt (1950)
- Fingerprints Don't Lie (1951) as James Stover
- Mask of the Dragon (1951) as Phil Ramsey
- Danger Zone (1951) as Police Lt. Bruger
- Roaring City (1951) as Inspector Bruger
- Pier 23 (1951) as Police Inspector Lt. Bruger
- Passage West (1951) as Ben Johnson
- Mesa of Lost Women (1953) as Dan Mulcahey
- Prince of Players (1955) as Colonel Who Captures Booth (uncredited)
- An Annapolis Story (1955) as Cmdr. Wilson (uncredited)
- City of Shadows (1955) as Phil Jergins
- The Gun That Won the West (1955) as Lang, Rifle Demonstrator (uncredited)
- The Girl in the Red Velvet Swing (1955) as Charles Dana Gibson (uncredited)
- Women Without Men (1956) as Kent Foster
- Code 3 (1957, TV Series) as Assistant Sheriff Rodger Barnett
- Official Detective (1957, TV Series) as Robertson
- Missile to the Moon (1958) as Steve Dayton
- Cyborg 2087 (1966) as General (final film role)
