= Roaring City =

1951 film by William A. Berke

- Directed by: William Berke
- Written by: Julian Harmon; Herbert H. Margolis; Lou Morheim; Victor West
- Produced by: Jack Leewood; William Berke
- Starring: Hugh Beaumont; Edward Brophy; Richard Travis
- Cinematography: Jack Greenhalgh
- Edited by: Carl Pierson; Harry Reynolds
- Music by: Bert Shefter
- Production company: Spartan Productions
- Distributed by: Lippert Pictures
- Release date: May 4, 1951
- Running time: 59 minutes
- Country: United States
- Language: English

Roaring City is a 1951 American crime film produced and directed by William Berke and starring Hugh Beaumont, Edward Brophy and Richard Travis. It was distributed by the independent Lippert Pictures as a second feature intended for television as well as the cinema.

The film is closely related to the 1951 film Pier 23, which was filmed simultaneously with the same director, producers and cast, and with similar opening sequences. The two films were released at the same time, both as second features. Although Lipper Pictures announced before production that the project originally titled Pier 23 was to be retitled as Roaring City, the films are separate and have different overall plots.

== Plot ==
A private detective investigates a boxer's sudden death in San Francisco.

== Cast ==
- Hugh Beaumont as Dennis O'Brien
- Edward Brophy as 'Professor' Frederick Simpson Schicker
- Richard Travis as Inspector Bruger
- Joan Valerie as Irma Rand
- Wanda McKay as Sylvia Rand
- Rebel Randall as Gail Chase
- William Tannen as Ed Gannon
- Greg McClure as Steve Belzig, alias Vic Lundy
- Anthony Warde as Bill Rafferty
- Abner Biberman as Eddie Paige
- Stanley Price as Harry Barton
- A.J. Roth
- Paul Brooks as Ted Fallon, alias Steve Rand

== See also ==
- Danger Zone (1951)
- Pier 23 (1951)
