= The Return of Wildfire =

1948 film directed by Ray Taylor

Black Stallion
- Theatrical release poster
- Directed by: Ray Taylor
- Written by: Betty Burbridge; Carl Hittleman
- Produced by: Carl Hittleman
- Starring: Richard Arlen
- Music by: Albert Glasser
- Production company: Lippert Pictures
- Distributed by: Screen Guild Productions
- Release date: August 13, 1948
- Running time: 83 minutes
- Country: United States
- Language: English

The Return of Wildfire, also known as Black Stallion, is a 1948 American Western film directed by Ray Taylor and starring Richard Arlen.

It's a sequel to Wildfire starring Bob Steele and Sterling Holloway.

== Plot ==
Pop Marlowe owns a horse ranch and his daughters help maintain it. Judy Marlow runs the ranch, and sister Pat helps with the chores. When Pat is injured while trying to capture the wild horse Wildfire, drifter Dobe Williams helps her get back home. Pat asks Pop to give Dobe a job, and in return he agrees to help Pat catch Wildfire.

Frank Keller, the ranch foreman, has fallen on hard times after losing $6,000 at the local saloon owned by Marty Quinn. Knowing that Keller is courting Judy, and that the ranch has plenty of horses, Quinn tells Keller to buy about 500 head of the Marlowe's breeding stock to repay the debt. The problem is that Pop knows Quinn, and is aware that he only wants the horses so that he can monopolize the market and drive prices up. Quinn reminds Keller that should anything happen to Pop, that his girlfriend Judy will inherit the ranch.

As Pat and Dobe become closer, Wildfire frees all the ranch's herd, and the ranch hands must round up all the horses. During the round-up Keller beats Pop, trusting that the herd of rushing horses will kill him. In the aftermath Judy flirts with Dobe, Keller and Pat get jealous, and Judy agrees to sell the herd to Quinn. Dobe leaves town, but after Judy and Pat reconcile they head out after him to apologize. When Dobe asks the saloon owner to sell the horses back, Quinn gets angry and pistol whips him. Judy still wants to break Dobe and Pat up, but the pair work on catching and taming the wild herd of horses that Wildfire leads, and soon the ranch has 300 horses broken in. Quinn doesn't want those horses sold, and blackmails Keller with his knowledge of Pop Marlowe's murder. Keller gets all the ranch hands drunk to slow down the ranch's work at taming the wild horses. Dobe finds out that Quinn is trying to hire the ranch hands out from under the Marlows, forces the hands back to the ranch with his six-shooter, and sobers them up.

Quinn and his gang storm the ranch and Pat is injured in the raid. Quinn orders Keller to trap Wildfire so he won't lead the other horses out into the wild. When horse and man come face to face, Wildfire stomps Keller to death. Dobe then goes after Wildfire thinking he's herded the horses out into the wild, but Judy rushes to tell Dobe that Pat is recovering nicely, and that Quinn is actually the one who is responsible. Quinn eventually shoots and wounds Wildfire while Dobe is driving the herd back to the ranch. Dobe then goes after the bad guys and defeats them in a drawn out fight. As Wildfire recovers Judy stops interfering with Dobe and Pat. Wildfire is then released back to the wide open as Dobe and Pat more forward with their relationship.

== Cast ==
- Richard Arlen as Dobe Williams
- Patricia Morison as Pat Marlowe
- Mary Beth Hughes as Judy Marlowe
- James Millican as Frank Keller
- Reed Hadley as Marty Quinn
- Chris-Pin Martin as Pancho
- Stanley Andrews as Pop Marlowe
- Mike Ragan as Dirk - Henchman (as Holly Bane)
- Highland Dale as Wildfire - the Horse
