= Grand Canyon (1949 film) =

American Western film

- Directed by: Paul Landres
- Screenplay by: Jack Harvey; Milton Luban
- Based on: story by Hittleman
- Produced by: Carl Hittleman
- Starring: Richard Arlen
- Music by: Albert Glasser
- Production company: Lippert Pictures
- Distributed by: Screen Guild Productions (US)
- Release date: May 20, 1949
- Running time: 65 minutes
- Country: United States
- Language: English

Grand Canyon is a 1949 American Western film starring Richard Arlen. It was the directorial debut of veteran editor Robert Landres and was financed by Robert L. Lippert. It was shot at the Nassour Studios.

Lippert assigned Carl Hittleman to produce the film after the success of I Shot Jesse James.
