= I Shot Jesse James =

1949 film by Samuel Fuller

- Film poster
- Directed by: Samuel Fuller
- Screenplay by: Samuel Fuller
- Story by: Samuel Fuller; Homer Croy
- Based on: articles first published in The American Weekly by Homer Croy
- Produced by: Carl K. Hittleman; Robert L. Lippert
- Starring: Preston Foster; Barbara Britton; John Ireland
- Cinematography: Ernest Miller
- Edited by: Paul Landres
- Music by: Albert Glasser
- Production company: Lippert Pictures
- Distributed by: Janus Films; Screen Guild Productions
- Release date: February 26, 1949
- Running time: 81 minutes
- Country: United States
- Language: English
- Budget: $118,000 or $500,000

I Shot Jesse James is a 1949 American Western film starring Reed Hadley as Jesse James and John Ireland as Bob Ford. Directed by Samuel Fuller in his debut behind the camera, it portrays the murder of Jesse James by Robert Ford and Robert Ford's life afterwards. The story is built around a fictional rivalry between Ford and his eventual killer, Edward O'Kelley (called John in the film), over a woman.

== Plot ==
Bob Ford of the Jesse James gang is wounded during a bank robbery. He mends at Jesse's home in St. Joseph, Missouri for six months, although Jesse's wife Zee doesn't trust him.

Cynthy Waters, an actress with whom Bob is in love, comes to town to perform on stage. Bob catches her speaking with John Kelley, a prospector, and is jealous. He knows that Cynthy wants to get married and settle down.

In need of money, Bob hears of the governor's $10,000 reward for Jesse. Upon hearing this, he realizes he can use the money to buy a plot of land for a farm and start a family. He initially plans to shoot him while he bathes, but he holds off on that. Later on, as they have dinner and talk, Jesse gets up and removes his holster. As he straightens a crooked picture, Bob shoots Jesse in the back, killing him. After spending time in jail, Bob is pardoned by the governor. However, because he didn't bring Jesse in alive, he receives a reward of just $500. He spends the money on an engagement ring.

Bob goes to visit Cynthy, who hears about the murder and condemns his actions. He presents her with the engagement ring, but she profusely turns him down. He comes to the conclusion that Kelley is turning her away from him, so he decides to kill him. Cynthy gets to his hotel before Bob does, and she warns Kelley of his intentions, to which he relucantly agrees to leave town. By the time Bob gets there, they are both gone, much to his chagrin.

Harry Kane, who manages Cynthy's career, books Bob for stage appearances in which he re-enacts the shooting of Jesse. On the night of his first performance, he reflects on his actions and leaves the stage, leading to him getting booed by the audience. At the local tavern, a traveling guitarist comes in, singing a ballad about Jesse's life and eventual death at the hands of Bob. He reveals himself to the guitarist and pressures him into continuing his ballad. Afterwards, he leaves the bar and gets into a brief gunfight with a young man with a shotgun. When he runs out of bullets, he reveals to Bob that he shot at him for the opportunity to be "the biggest gunman in the country." Soon after, a group of horsemen charge into town with news about an abundance of silver in Creede, Colorado. He runs into Cynthy, who tells him that everyone wants to kill him, thinking that they'll become famous as a result. He tells her about his plans to go to Colorado, and he promises to marry her once he gets rich. They exchange a kiss.

Bob goes to Colorado to try prospecting and runs into Kelley, who is rejecting offers to become Creede's town marshal. In the bar, a drunk prospector barges in, claiming he has found a deposit of silver. A couple of patrons try to get him to sell the mine to them, but Kelley intervenes and gets into a fist fight with one of them. A cohort tries to shoot Kelley, but Bob shoots the gun out of his hand, citing his disdain for shooting a man without his gun. Bob wakes up one day to find both Kelley and the engagement ring missing, accusing Kelley of being the thief. The drunk prospector from the night before, nicknamed Soapy, acknowledges Bob's desire to get married and offers him the opportunity to work in the mines with him to ensure that happens.

Cynthy receives a telegram from Bob about him striking silver and tells her to get to Creede immediately. When she arrives in town, Bob notices that something is bothering her. Kelley comes in with the thief who took Bob's ring and he returns it to him. Kelley is disappointed when Cynthy accepts Bob's proposal, so he accepts the job as marshal. Harry comes into Cynthy's room and tells her back out of the wedding, but she refuses out of fear for him.

Kelley meets with Cynthy to forbid her from marrying Bob. She confesses that she doesn't love Bob, in favor of Kelley. Frank James, brother of Jesse, overhears their conversation and comes in with a shotgun. He momentarily gets distracted, and Kelley uses the opportunity to knock him out. Frank is subsequently put on trial, but he is set free after a week in jail. Frank encounters Bob at the tavern and tells him of Cynthy's love for Kelley. Meanwhile, Kelley is informed of Bob coming to the tavern, and he goes out onto the street to face him. He initially turns his back on Bob, much to his anger. Once he does turn around, he tells Bob the truth about Cynthy. He assumes Kelley won't shoot because he believes he doesn't love her enough. They both fire at each other, with Bob taking a fatal shot to the chest and Kelley only suffering a shoulder wound. Cynthy goes outside to comfort Bob. As he dies, he apologizes to Cynthy for killing Jessie.

== Cast ==
- Preston Foster as John Kelley
- Barbara Britton as Cynthy Waters
- John Ireland as Bob Ford
- Reed Hadley as Jesse James
- J. Edward Bromberg as Harry Kane
- Victor Kilian as Soapy
- Tom Tyler as Frank James
- Tommy Noonan as Charles Ford
- Eddie Dunn as Joe, Silver King Bartender
- Margia Dean as Saloon Singer
- Byron Foulger as Silver King Room Clerk
- Jeni Le Gon as Veronica, Cynthy's Maid
- Barbara Woodell as Mrs. Zee James
- Phillip Pine as Man in Saloon
- Robin Short as Troubadour
- Fred Aldrich as Townsman (uncredited)

== Production ==
Sam Fuller was a writer who wanted to direct. He offered Robert L. Lippert a script for a low price if he could direct as well. Fuller's directing fee was a reported $5,000.

Filming started 25 October 1948.

== Release ==
The film premiered in St Joseph, where Bob Ford shot Jesse James.

The film was released on video by the Criterion Collection's Eclipse imprint together with The Baron of Arizona and The Steel Helmet.

== Reception ==
Robert L. Lippert sold the film's international rights for a flat $200,000.

The film reportedly earned Lippert over half a million dollars in profits and was the movie that took his career to the next level in Hollywood.

Lippert was so pleased with the film he signed Carl Hittleman to produce five more films: Grand Canyon, Park Row, The Baron of Arizona, an adaptation of Twenty Thousand Leagues Under the Seas and The Ghost of Jesse James; Park Row, Baron and Leagues were to be directed by Sam Fuller. Fuller did make Baron for Lippert but did Park Row for another producer. Ghost of Jesse James became The Return of Jesse James. Hitleman eventually signed a contract with Universal.
