= The Little Savage (1959 film) =

1959 film by Byron Haskin

- Directed by: Byron Haskin
- Written by: Eric Norden
- Based on: The Little Savage by Frederick Marryat
- Produced by: Jack Leewood
- Starring: Pedro Armendáriz
- Production companies: Associated Producers Inc; Producciones Sotomayor
- Distributed by: 20th Century Fox
- Release date: March 1959
- Running time: 73 minutes
- Country: United States
- Language: English

The Little Savage is a 1959 American adventure film directed by Byron Haskin. It stars Pedro Armendáriz and Christiane Martel. It is loosely based on an 1848 novel of the same name by Frederick Marryat.

It was one of the first films from Associated Producers Inc (API). It was originally announced for part of the slate of films for Regal Films.

== Cast ==
- Pedro Armendáriz as El Tiburon
- Christiane Martel as Nanoa Riboud
- Rodolfo Hoyos Jr. as Captain Taursus
- Terry Rangno as Frank Henniger – as a boy
- Robert Palmer as Frank Henniger – as a man

== Production ==
Marryat's novel had been purchased in 1938 by Gaumont British as a vehicle for Will Fyffe.
