= Danger Zone (1951 film) =

1951 film directed by William A. Berke

- Directed by: William Berke
- Screenplay by: Julian Harmon
- Story by: Herbert Margolis; Louis Morheim
- Produced by: William Berke; Jack Leewood
- Starring: Hugh Beaumont; Tom Neal; Edward Brophy
- Cinematography: Jack Greenhalgh
- Edited by: Carl Pierson; Harry Reynolds
- Music by: Bert Shefter
- Production company: Spartan Productions
- Distributed by: Lippert Pictures
- Release date: April 20, 1951
- Running time: 56 minutes
- Country: United States
- Language: English

Danger Zone is a 1951 American film noir directed by William Berke and starring Hugh Beaumont, Tom Neal and Edward Brophy. A low-budget second feature, it was distributed by the independent Lippert Pictures.

== Plot ==
Claire Underwood hires San Francisco private eye Dennis O'Brien to purchase a saxophone case at a yacht-party auction, but O'Brien is slugged and the case is stolen by Larry Dunlap. O'Brien learns that Claire and Dunlap are rivals in a smuggling racket, and he seizes Claire just as she is about to leave the country with the case and its stolen jewels. He is then framed for the murder of Vicki Jason's husband. With the aid of Frederick Schickler, he proves his innocence when Vicki pulls a gun on her coconspirator and lover Edgar Spadely, another private detective, and Vicki admits her own guilt in the murder of her husband.

== Cast ==
- Hugh Beaumont as Dennis O'Brien
- Tom Neal as Edgar Spadely
- Edward Brophy as Prof. Frederick Simpson Schicker
- Richard Travis as Police Lt. Bruger
- Pamela Blake as Vicki Jason
- Virginia Dale as Claire Underwood
- Ralph Sanford as Larry Dunlap
- Paula Drew as Sheila Jason
- Jack Reitzen as Cole, the Auctioneer
- Edward Clark as Elderly Man at Auction
- Richard Monahan as Henry, the Bartender
- Don Garner as Bud Becker
- Tiny Jones as Woman at Auction

== See also ==
- Roaring City (1951)
- Pier 23 (1951)
