= West of the Brazos =

1950 film by Thomas Carr

- Directed by: Thomas Carr
- Written by: Ron Ormond; Maurice Tombragel
- Produced by: Ron Ormond executive Robert L. Lippert
- Cinematography: Ernest Miller
- Production company: Lippert Pictures
- Distributed by: Lippert Pictures (US); Exclusive (UK)
- Release date: June 2, 1950
- Running time: 58 minutes
- Country: United States
- Language: English

West of the Brazos is a 1950 American Western film directed by Thomas Carr for Lippert Pictures and starring James Ellison.

== Plot ==
Three masked men – later to be identified as part of the Cyclone Kid (John Cason) bandit gang – rob a stage coach, taking the mail bag. Marshal Charley Blythe (Stanley Price) is trailing Shamrock Ellison (James Ellison) and Lucky Hayden (Russell Hayden), under the mistaken belief that they are they are part of the Cyclone Kid gang. In reality Shamrock and Lucky are on their way to see Shamrock's mother, after many years absence. They take shelter in a cabin during a cloudburst, where Lucky watches Shamrock play harmonica; he can only watch, as opposed to listening, because Lucky is deaf - a result of having been in a war. When Shamrock and Lucky leave the cabin, they are attacked by members of the Cyclone Kid gang. Blythe helps the pair fight off the outlaws but is wounded; they leave him in a cabin at "sheep camp" to recuperate.

Meanwhile, the Cyclone Kid is impersonating Shamrock and has a court date at which, if successsful, he will be declared the rightful owner of Shamrock's family ranch. Unknown to Shamrock, oil has been discovered on the property, greatly increasing its value. The Cyclone Kid has arranged to sell the ranch to a big oil company, get paid in cash and abscond. Learning of the situation, Shamrock and Lucky go to court to protect Shamrock's claim, but are unsuccessful, despite the testimony of Ann Green (Julie Adams), Shamrock's beautiful and loyal friend.

Shamrock is arrested on suspicion of the missing Blythe's murder. Ultimately, Blythe is found, the Cyclone Kid is defeated, Shamrock inherits what is rightfully his, and Ann and Shamrock kiss. Lucky announces "There's going to be a wedding!"

== Cast ==
- James Ellison as Shamrock Ellison
- Russell Hayden as Lucky Hayden
- Stanley Price as Marshal Charley Blythe
- John Cason as The Cyclone Kid
- Julie Adams as Ann Green
