= Thunder Island (1963 film) =

1963 film by Jack Leewood

- Theatrical release poster
- Directed by: Jack Leewood
- Screenplay by: Don Devlin; Jack Nicholson
- Produced by: Jack Leewood associated Frank Marrero
- Starring: Gene Nelson; Fay Spain; Brian Kelly; Míriam Colón; Art Bedard; Antonio Torres Martino
- Cinematography: John M. Nickolaus, Jr.
- Music by: Paul Sawtell; Bert Shefter
- Production company: Associated Producers Inc
- Distributed by: 20th Century Fox
- Release date: September 1963
- Running time: 65 minutes
- Country: United States
- Language: English

Thunder Island is a 1963 American action film directed by Jack Leewood, written by Don Devlin and Jack Nicholson, and starring Gene Nelson, Fay Spain, Brian Kelly, Míriam Colón, Art Bedard and Antonio Torres Martino.

The film was made by Robert L. Lippert's Associated Producers and released in September 1963, by 20th Century Fox.

Actor Jack Nicholson co-wrote the screenplay.

== Plot ==
Contract killer Billy Poole is hired to assassinate a South American dictator. When he arrives, he and associate Anita Chavez arrange to have an innocent bystander, advertising man Vincent Dodge, take them by boat to the intended victim's island compound, holding Vincent's wife Helen hostage.

Poole is able only to wound his target. After killing his accomplice Anita himself, Poole is shot by Vincent, who then rescues his wife.

== Cast ==
- Gene Nelson as Billy Poole
- Fay Spain as Helen Dodge
- Brian Kelly as Vincent Dodge
- Míriam Colón as Anita Chavez
- Art Bedard as Ramon Alou
- Antonio Torres Martino as Colonel Cepeda
- Esther Sandoval as Rena
- José de San Antón as Antonio Perez
- Evelyn Kaufman as Jo Dodge
- Stephanie Rifkinson as Linda Perez

== Production ==
Jack Nicholson co-wrote the film early in his career. He and Don Devlin were paid $1,250. The film was shot in Puerto Rico. Robert L. Lippert was impressed with Nicholson's work and hired him as a writer and actor for Flight to Fury shot in the Philippines.
