= City in Darkness =

1939 US film by Herbert I. Leeds

- Film poster
- Directed by: Herbert I. Leeds
- Screenplay by: Robert Ellis; Helen Logan
- Story by: Gina Kaus; Ladislaus Fodor
- Produced by: Sol M. Wurtzel
- Starring: Sidney Toler; Lynn Bari; Richard Clark
- Cinematography: Virgil Miller
- Edited by: Harry Reynolds
- Music by: Samuel Kaylin
- Distributed by: 20th Century-Fox
- Release date: December 1, 1939 (US)
- Running time: 69 minutes
- Country: United States
- Language: English

City in Darkness, also known as Charlie Chan in City in Darkness, is a 1939 American drama film directed by Herbert I. Leeds and starring Sidney Toler, Lynn Bari, and Richard Clark. It is one of the films in the Charlie Chan film series, the fourth starring Toler, and was released on December 1, 1939.

== Plot ==
Charlie Chan (Sidney Toler) is visiting Paris during the Czech annexation crisis in September 1938, but is having trouble finding a way to return to the United States, since there are transportation disruptions due to the threat of the impending war and the Munich Crisis. While visiting the office of the Chief of Police Romaine (C. Henry Gordon), who is away on business, word is received that Petroff (Douglass Dumbrille), a well-known millionaire, has been murdered. Romaine's bumbling godson, Police Inspector Marcel Spivak (Harold Huber) has been left in charge during the chief's absence, and is terrified of handling such a high-profile murder investigation. He asks for Chan's assistance, which is agreed to.

Spivak suspects his butler, Antoine (Pedro de Cordoba), but spy Charlotte Ronnell (Dorothy Tree) is spotted fleeing the residence. Due to a chance encounter earlier, Chan realizes that local woman Marie Dubon (Lynn Bari) is involved, and the two detectives head to her hotel. Charlie learns that Dubon was helping her husband, Tony Madero (Richard Clarke), clear his name after Petroff accused him of smuggling. Following a clue in Dubon's room, Chan interrogates counterfeiter Louis Santelle (Leo G. Carroll). Returning to the Petroff household, Chan and Spivak track down burglars Lola (Barbara Leonard), Max (Louis Mercier), and Alex (George Davis) (who had broken into Petroff's house just before the murder) before interrogating Petroff's business partner, Belescu (Noel Madison).

After nearly being killed by Santelle, Charlie realizes that three clues are the key to the case: A dropped franc coin, a wooden leg, and a telephone left off the hook. After Belescu is shot, Chan and Spivak chase Ronnell to Le Bourget Airport. But her plane crashes during takeoff and she dies. Chan returns to police headquarters, and reveals that Antoine (a French patriot) killed Petroff after returning home early and discovering that Petroff was selling arms to Nazi Germany. Prefect Romaine says Antoine will likely stand trial for murder, but is likely to receive the Legion of Honour instead of the guillotine.

== Cast ==
- Sidney Toler as Charlie Chan
- Lynn Bari as Marie Dubon
- Richard Clark as Tony Madero
- Harold Huber as Marcel
- Pedro de Cordoba as Antoine
- Dorothy Tree as Charlotte Ronnell
- C. Henry Gordon as Prefect of police
- Douglass Dumbrille as Petroff
- Noel Madison as Belescu
- Leo G. Carroll as Louis Santelle
- George Davis as Alex
- Louis Mercier as Max
- Barbara Leonard as Lola
- Lon Chaney Jr. as Pierre
- Gino Corrado as Wine Cellar Proprietor
- Adrienne D'Ambricourts as Hotel Proprietor
- Richard Fleischmann as Husband of Hotel Proprietor

== Critical reception ==
A contemporaneous review of the film in The New York Times described it as "more fun than just the average Chan picture," and noted that "Lynn Bari, who looks too much like Claudette Colbert; Richard Clarke, who looks almost too much like James Stewart, and Harold Huber, who just looks like Harold Huber in the role of a comical French police inspector, or whatever his official status might be, lend excellent support to Sidney Toler." Harrison's Reports did not give the film a positive review, being critical of the plot and a script that suffered "from an over-abundance of dialogue". The review was also critical of Huber's performance as Marcel.

Film critic Stuart Galbraith IV wrote in DVD Talk that the film "is a drab and dreary entry more of historical interest than as entertainment" that is "rigidly compartmentalized" and "thoroughly uninvolving", that Huber's performance as "annoying hamminess," but also noted that "the picture is interesting in how it dances around real-world events, how it subtly criticizes the Nazis."
