= Pardon Our Nerve =

- Theatrical release poster
- Directed by: H. Bruce Humberstone
- Screenplay by: Robert Ellis; Helen Logan
- Story by: Hilda Stone; Elizabeth Reinhardt
- Produced by: Sol M. Wurtzel
- Starring: Lynn Bari; June Gale; Guinn "Big Boy" Williams; Michael Whalen; Edward Brophy; John Miljan
- Cinematography: Charles G. Clarke
- Edited by: Harry Reynolds
- Music by: Gene Rose
- Production company: 20th Century Fox
- Distributed by: 20th Century Fox
- Release date: February 24, 1939
- Running time: 65 minutes
- Country: United States
- Language: English

Pardon Our Nerve is a 1939 American comedy film directed by H. Bruce Humberstone and written by Robert Ellis and Helen Logan. The film stars Lynn Bari, June Gale, Guinn "Big Boy" Williams, Michael Whalen, Edward Brophy and John Miljan. The film was released on February 24, 1939, by 20th Century Fox.

== Cast ==
- Lynn Bari as Terry Wilson
- June Gale as Judy Davis
- Guinn "Big Boy" Williams as Samson Smith
- Michael Whalen as Dick Malone
- Edward Brophy as Nosey Nelson
- John Miljan as Duke Page
- Theodore von Eltz as Lucky Carson
- Ward Bond as Kid Ramsey
- Chester Clute as Mr. Flemingwell
- Helen Ericson as Arabella
- Tom Kennedy as Bodyguard
- Ray Walker as Publicity Man
