= Motor Patrol =

1950 film directed by Sam Newfield

- Directed by: Sam Newfield
- Written by: Maurice Tombragel; Orville Hampton
- Based on: story by Maurice Tombragel
- Produced by: Barney A. Sarecky executive Robert L. Lippert
- Cinematography: Ernest Miller
- Production company: Lippert Pictures
- Distributed by: Lippert Pictures
- Release date: May 12, 1950
- Running time: 60 minutes
- Country: United States
- Language: English

Motor Patrol (also known as Highway Patrol) is a 1950 American film directed by Sam Newfield.

== Plot ==
Two Los Angeles Police Department motorcycle officers respond to a report of a traffic accident and find that a pedestrian was killed by a hit-and-run driver. Detectives determine that the incident was related to a stolen car ring. An LAPD academy recruit volunteers for an undercover mission to penetrate the stolen-car ring posing as a car thief from Chicago. Eventually the crooks discover that he is a police officer.

== Cast ==
- Don Castle as Ken Foster
- Jane Nigh as Connie Taylor
- Bill Henry as Larry Collins
- Gwen O'Connor as Jean Collins
- Onslow Stevens as Lt. Dearborn
- Reed Hadley as Robert Flynn
- Dick Travis as Bill Hartley
- Sid Melton as Omar Shelley
- Charles Victor as Russ Garver
