= Hugh Beaumont =

American actor (1910–1982)

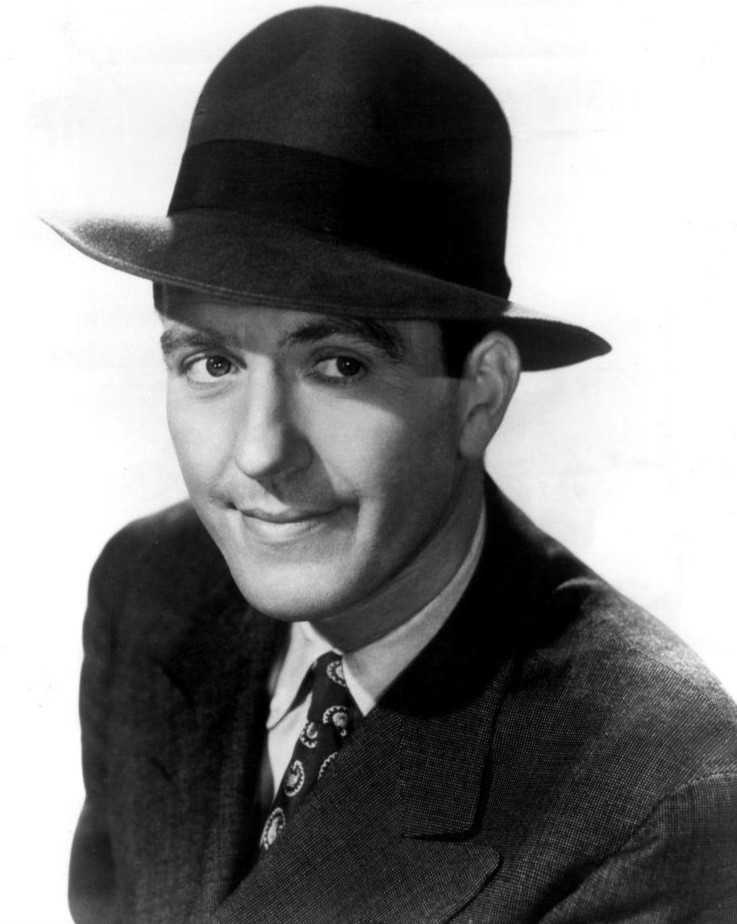
- Beaumont in 1956
- Born: Eugene Hugh Beaumont; February 16, 1910; Lawrence, Kansas, U.S.
- Died: May 14, 1982 (aged 72); Munich, West Germany
- Education: University of Chattanooga (Bachelor of Arts); University of Southern California (Master of Theology)
- Occupation: Actor
- Years active: 1940–1972
- Spouse: Kathryn Adams (m. 1941; div. 1974)
- Children: 3

Eugene Hugh Beaumont (February 16, 1910 – May 14, 1982) was an American actor. He was best known for his portrayal of Ward Cleaver on the television series Leave It to Beaver, originally broadcast from 1957 to 1963, and as private detective Michael Shayne in a series of low-budget crime films in 1946 and 1947.

== Early life ==
Beaumont was born in 1910 in Lawrence, Kansas, to Ethel Adaline Whitney and Edward H. Beaumont, a traveling salesman whose profession kept the family on the move. After graduating from the Baylor School in Chattanooga, Tennessee, in the class of 1930, he attended the University of Chattanooga, where he played football. He later studied at the University of Southern California and graduated with a master's degree in theology in 1946.

== Career ==
Beaumont began his career in show business in 1931 by performing in theaters, nightclubs, and radio. He began acting in motion pictures in 1940, appearing in over three dozen films. Many of those roles were bit parts and minor roles and were not credited. He often worked with actor William Bendix; they had prominent roles in the 1946 film noir The Blue Dahlia, playing the friends of star Alan Ladd's character. In 1946–1947, Beaumont starred in five films as private detective Michael Shayne, assuming the role from Lloyd Nolan. In 1950, he narrated the short film A Date with Your Family. He also starred in The Mole People in 1956.

In the early 1950s, Beaumont secured television work, often with guest roles on series such as Adventures of Superman, City Detective, Crossroads, Fireside Theatre, Ford Theatre, The Lone Ranger, Medic, The Millionaire, and Schlitz Playhouse of Stars. From 1951 to 1953, he narrated the Reed Hadley series Racket Squad, based on the cases of fictional detective Captain John Braddock in San Francisco. In 1954 and 1955, Beaumont appeared in The Public Defender, Hadley's second series, appearing in three episodes as Ed McGrath. That year, he guest-starred in the Lassie episode "The Well", one of two episodes filmed as pilots for the series. He also portrayed a sympathetic characterization of the Western bandit Jesse James on the series Tales of Wells Fargo.

In September 1957, Beaumont was selected to replace Max Showalter, who had appeared as Ward Cleaver in "It's a Small World", the original pilot for the sitcom Leave It to Beaver, in the role of wise small-town father Ward Cleaver. After initially airing to tepid ratings on CBS, the series moved to ABC for its second season, where it achieved more solid ratings. Beginning with the third season, Beaumont began directing several episodes; including the series' final episode "Family Scrapbook", often considered the first series finale.

In 2014, TV Guide ranked Beaumont's portrayal of Ward Cleaver at number 28 on its list of the "50 Greatest TV Dads of All Time".

In 1959, before production on the third season of Leave It to Beaver began, Beaumont's wife, son, and mother-in-law were driving from Minnesota to Hollywood to visit when a car accident killed Beaumont's mother-in-law and severely injured his son. Jerry Mathers later stated that the tragedy seriously affected Beaumont's participation in the production, with Beaumont often just "walking through" his part.

After Leave It to Beaver ended production in 1963, Beaumont appeared in many community theater productions and played a few guest roles on television series such as Marcus Welby, M.D., Mannix, Petticoat Junction, The Virginian, and Wagon Train. In February 1966, he made another appearance on Lassie, 11 years after his first.

He also continued to have success as a writer, selling several television screenplays and radio scripts as well as short stories to various magazines. He gradually left the entertainment business, launching a second career as a Christmas-tree farmer in Grand Rapids, Minnesota. After suffering a debilitating stroke in 1970, Beaumont officially retired from acting in 1972. In 1980, he did appear in a Beaver reunion with the rest of the cast that was conducted by a local Los Angeles TV station.

== Personal life and death ==
On April 13, 1941, Beaumont wed actress Kathryn Adams (née Hohn) at the Hollywood Congregational Church. They had sons Hunter and Mark, and daughter Kristy. Their marriage lasted 33 years, until their divorce in 1974. His son Hunter Beaumont (1943–2023) was a psychotherapist and author living in Germany.

Beaumont was a lay minister in the Methodist Church. During World War II, he was a conscientious objector and served as a medic.

On May 14, 1982, Beaumont died of a heart attack while visiting his son in Munich, West Germany. He was 72 years old.

== Filmography ==
Year	Title	Role	Notes
1940	Phantom Raiders	Seaman	uncredited
1940	The Secret Seven	Southern Racketeer	uncredited
1941	South of Panama	Paul Martin	
1941	The Cowboy and the Blonde	Sound Man	uncredited
1941	Private Nurse	McDonald	uncredited
1941	Unfinished Business	Hugh, the Bridegroom	uncredited
1941	Forbidden Passage	Clements	part of the Crime Does Not Pay series
1941	Week-End in Havana	Clipper Officer	uncredited
1942	Right to the Heart	Willie Donovan	
1942	Unseen Enemy	Narrator	
1942	Young America	G-Man	
1942	Canal Zone	Radio Operator	uncredited
1942	To the Shores of Tripoli	Orderly	uncredited
1942	The Wife Takes a Flyer	Officer	uncredited
1942	Gang Busters	Announcer and voice on office radio	uncredited
1942	Top Sergeant	Radio Newscaster	uncredited voice
1942	Flight Lieutenant	John McGinnis	uncredited
1942	Wake Island	Captain	uncredited
1942	Northwest Rangers	Warren - Mountie who finds Fowler's body	uncredited
1943	Flight for Freedom	Flight Instructor	uncredited
1943	He Hired the Boss	Jordan	
1943	Bombardier	Soldier	uncredited
1943	Du Barry Was a Lady	Footman	uncredited
1943	Good Luck, Mr. Yates	Adjutant	uncredited
1943	Mexican Spitfire's Blessed Event	George Sharpe	
1943	Salute to the Marines	Sergeant	uncredited
1943	The Fallen Sparrow	Otto Skaas	
1943	The Seventh Victim	Gregory Ward	
1943	There's Something About a Soldier	Lt. Martin	
1944	The Racket Man	"Irish" Duffy	
1944	The Story of Dr. Wassell	Aide to Admiral Hart in Surabaya	
1944	Song of the Open Road	John Moran	uncredited
1944	Mr. Winkle Goes to War	Ranger Officer	uncredited
1944	The Seventh Cross	Truck Driver	uncredited
1944	I Love a Soldier	John	uncredited
1944	Strange Affair	Detective Carey	uncredited
1944	They Live in Fear	Instructor	uncredited
1944	Practically Yours	Film-Cutter	uncredited
1945	Objective, Burma!	Captain Hennessey	uncredited
1945	Blood on the Sun	Johnny Clarke	uncredited
1945	Counter-Attack	Russian Lieutenant	uncredited
1945	The Lady Confesses	Larry Craig	
1945	Blonde from Brooklyn	Discharging Lieutenant	uncredited
1945	You Came Along	Chaplain	uncredited
1945	Apology for Murder	Kenny Blake	
1945	You Came Along	Chaplain	uncredited
1946	Murder Is My Business	Michael Shayne	
1946	Johnny Comes Flying Home	Engineer	uncredited
1946	The Blue Dahlia	George Copeland	
1946	Larceny in Her Heart	Michael Shayne	
1946	Blonde for a Day	Michael Shayne	
1947	The Guilt of Janet Ames	Frank Merino	uncredited
1947	Three on a Ticket	Michael Shayne	
1947	Too Many Winners	Michael Shayne	
1947	Railroaded!	Police Sgt. Mickey Ferguson	
1947	Bury Me Dead	Michael Dunn	
1948	Reaching from Heaven	Bill Starling	
1948	Money Madness	Steve Clark / Freddie Howard	
1948	The Counterfeiters	Phillip Drake	
1949	Tokyo Joe	Provost Marshal Major	uncredited
1950	Second Chance	Dr. Emory	
1950	The Flying Missile	Major Wilson	
1951	Target Unknown	Colonel	uncredited
1951	The Last Outpost	Lt. Fenton	
1951	Danger Zone	Dennis O'Brien	
1951	Go for Broke!	Chaplain	uncredited
1951	Roaring City	Denny O'Brien	
1951	Pier 23	Dennis O'Brien	
1951	Home Town Story	Bob MacFarland	uncredited
1951	Savage Drums	Bill Fenton	uncredited
1951	Mr. Belvedere Rings the Bell	Policeman	uncredited
1951	Lost Continent	Robert Phillips	
1951	Callaway Went Thataway	Mr. Adkins, Attorney	uncredited
1951	Overland Telegraph	Brad Roberts	
1952	Phone Call from a Stranger	Dr. Tim Brooks	
1952	Bugles in the Afternoon	Lt. Cooke	uncredited
1952	Wild Stallion	Capt. Wilmurt	
1952	Washington Story	Chaplain	uncredited
1952	Night Without Sleep	John Harkness	
1952	The Member of the Wedding	Minister	uncredited
1953	The Mississippi Gambler	Kennerly	uncredited
1953	225,000 Mile Proving Ground, 1953	Narrator/reporter E.D. Gillespie	produced by Dudley Pictures for American Association of Railroads
1955	Hell's Horizon	Al Trask	
1956	The Revolt of Mamie Stover	San Francisco Policeman	uncredited
1956	The Mole People	Dr. Jud Bellamin	
1957	Night Passage	Jeff Kurth	
1965	The Human Duplicators	Austin Welles	

== Television credits ==
Year	Title	Role	Notes
1950	The Silver Theatre	Harry Hamilton	episode: "Lady with Ideas"
1951	The Bigelow Theatre	Harry Hamilton	episode: "Lady with Ideas"
1952	Dangerous Assignment	various roles	episode: "The Piece of String Story" episode: "The Manger Story" episode: "The Assassin Ring Story"
1952	Hopalong Cassidy	Hank Scofield	episode: "The Feud"
1952–1953	Racket Squad	Narrator	33 episodes
1953	Ford Theatre	Sheriff Burns	episode: "The Trestle"
1953	Big Town	Carl Kesten / Rodney Mitchell	episode: "The Eliminator"
1953	Chevron Theatre		episode: "The Worthless Thing"
1953	The Lone Ranger	Rev. Randy Roberts	episode: "The Godless Men"
1953	Topper	Ed Merrill	episode: "The Spinster"
1953	Adventures of Superman	Dan Grayson	episode: "The Big Squeeze"
1953	Schlitz Playhouse of Stars	John Harris	episode: "Vacation for Ginny"
1953	Schlitz Playhouse of Stars		episode: "Guardian of the Clock"
1953	The Loretta Young Show		writer episode: "The Bronte Story"
1953–1954	Fireside Theatre	various roles	episode: "The Traitor" episode: "Fight Night"
1953–1956	Four Star Playhouse	various roles	6 episodes
1953–1956	Letter to Loretta	various roles	7 episodes
1954	City Detective	Philip Merriam	episode: "The Blonde Orchid"
1954	Waterfront	Roy Martin	episode: "Backwash"
1954	The Lineup	Charles Lanski	episode: "Cop Shooting"
1954	Studio 57	Charles Crane	episode: "Trap Mates"
1954	Public Defender	Gil Bowman / Ed McGrath	episode: "Lost Cause" episode: "Think No Evil"
1954	Lux Video Theatre	George	episode: "Call Me Mrs."
1954–1956	Cavalcade of America	various roles	episode: "The Paper Sword" episode: "A Time for Courage" episode: "The Boy Who Walked to America"
1955	Indian American	Brother David	TV movie
1955	Public Defender	Ed McGrath	episode: "A Knowledge of Astronomy"
1955	Medic	Col. Will Roberts	episode: "The World So High"
1955	Crossroads	Rev. Clifton R. Pond	episode: "With All My Love"
1955	Science Fiction Theatre	Dr. Guy Stanton	episode: "Conversation with an Ape"
1955	The Millionaire	Dr. Porter	episode: "The Walter Carter Story"
1955	The Pepsi-Cola Playhouse	Jeff	episode: "Stake My Life"
1955	The Touch of Steel	Col. Lander	TV movie
1955	Climax!		episode: "The Leaf Out of the Book"
1955	Lassie	Mr. Saunders	episode: "The Well"
1956	Climax!		episode: "Savage Portrait"
1956	Ford Theatre	Marshal Ferguson	episode: "The Silent Strangers"
1956	Lux Video Theatre	Larry	episode: "The Unfaithful"
1956	My Friend Flicka	Simmons	episode: "One Man's Horse"
1956	G.E. Summer Originals	Mike Hercules	episode: "Alias Mike Hercules" (unsold pilot)
1956	Matinee Theatre		episode: "The 25th Hour"
1956	Celebrity Playhouse		episode: "Home Is the Soldier"
1957	Meet McGraw	Clay Farrell	episode: "Border City"
1957	Tales of Wells Fargo	Jesse James	episode: "Jesse James"
1957–1963	Leave It to Beaver	Ward Cleaver	main role; 234 episodes directed 23 episodes (1960–63) writer of 1 episode (1959)
1964	Wagon Train	Jed Halick	episode: "The Pearlie Garnet Story"
1966	Lassie	Jim / Mr. Saunders	episode: "Cradle of the Deep"
1966	The Virginian	Maguire	episode: "Girl on the Glass Mountain"
1966	Petticoat Junction	Ronnie Beckman	episode: "Every Bachelor Should Have a Family"
1967	Petticoat Junction	Mr. Donald Elliott	episode: "With This Gown I Thee Wed" episode: "Meet the In-Laws"
1968	The Virginian	Maj. James Carlton	episode: "Nora"
1968	The Virginian	Charles Martin	episode: "With Help from Ulysses"
1968	Mannix	Frank Abbott	episode: "To the Swiftest, Death"
1970	Mannix	Hammond	episode: "The Mouse That Died"
1970	Mannix	Mr. Calder	episode: "War of Nerves"
1970	Medical Center	Dr. Simpson	episode: "Death Grip"
1970	Marcus Welby, M.D.	Jim Wagner	episode: "The Merely Syndrome"
1971	The Most Deadly Game	Dr. Dominick	episode: "The Classic Burial Position"
