= Arson, Inc. =

1949 film by William A. Berke

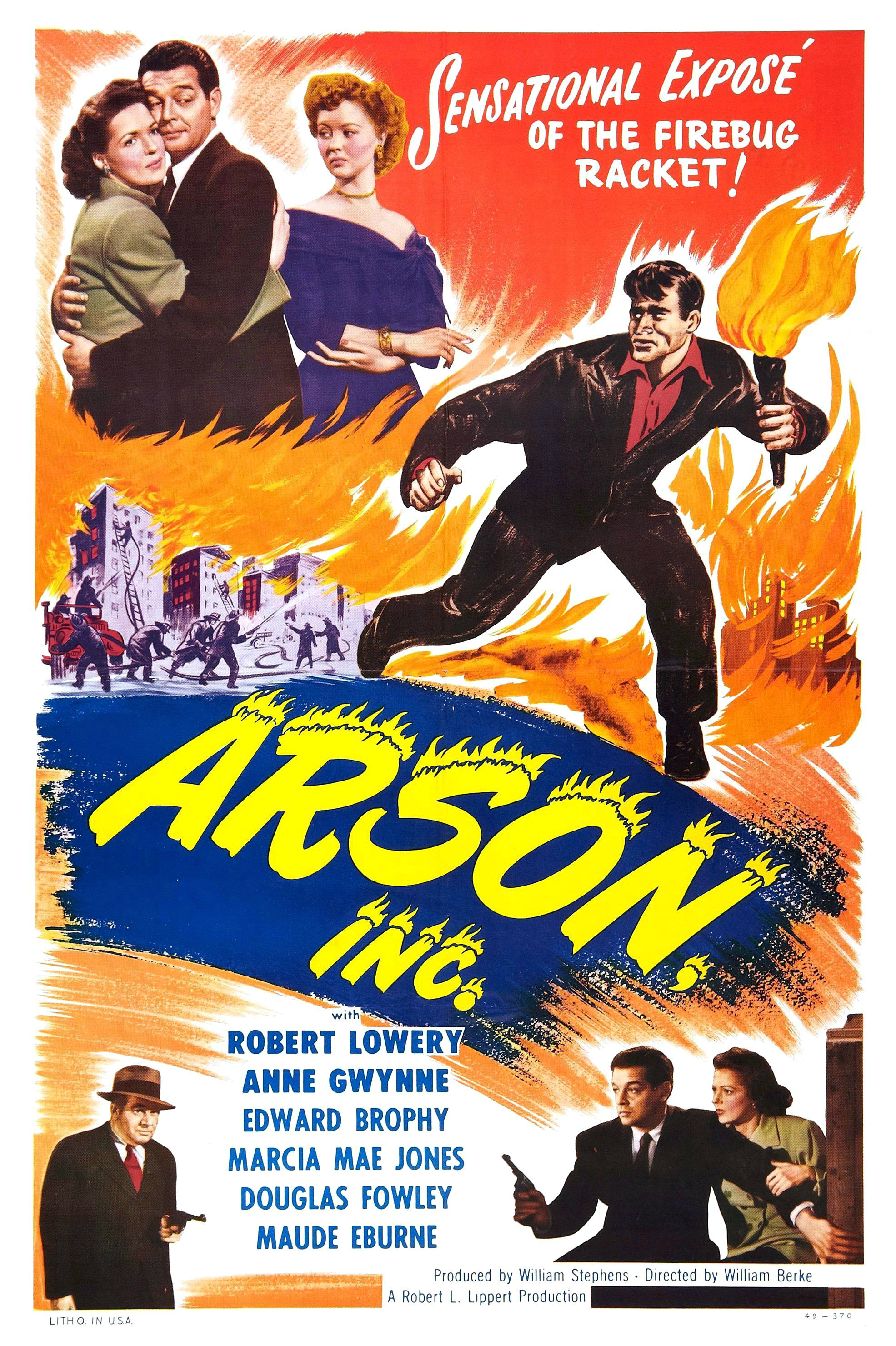
- Directed by: William Berke
- Screenplay by: Maurice Tombragel
- Story by: Arthur Caesar
- Produced by: William Stephens
- Starring: Robert Lowery; Anne Gwynne; Edward Brophy
- Cinematography: Carl Berger
- Edited by: Edward Mann
- Music by: Raoul Kraushaar
- Distributed by: Lippert Pictures
- Release date: 24 June 1949
- Running time: 63 minutes
- Country: United States
- Language: English
- Box office: $60,000

Arson, Inc. is a 1949 American film noir directed by William Berke. It is also known as Firebug Squad and Three Alarm Fire.

== Plot ==
Joe Martin is a fire fighter in Los Angeles who is assigned to the Arson Detail. His first assignment is to investigate a suspicious fur store fire that seems to be set by the store owner himself, Thomas Peyson. Joe's predecessor in the Arson Detail was killed when investigating the same fire and his file with his findings wasn't recovered from his body. This is just one of many suspicious fires in the last few years, where the insurance claims have been filed by the same agent, Frederick P. Fender.

Joe begins with Peyson, and visits his apartment which is a site of a recent fire. He meets the babysitter, Jane, a young teacher, and Joe drives her home and ask her out on a date the next evening. It turns out Peyson and Fender are in cahoots together - the first thing Peyson does after Joe leaves is phone his accomplice. They meet the day after, as Joe comes to see Fender as the next logical step in his investigation. Joe never sees Peyson, who sneaks out through a back door. Joe gets very little information from Fender, but Fender has one of his men, Pete, tail Joe.

Soon Joe realizes that he is being followed and when Pete finally makes contact, offering Joe a chance of making a little extra money, Joe decides to play along. When visiting an illegal bookie, Joe starts to fight a policeman and he gets fired for this behaviour. Pete makes contact again, wanting to use the ex-fireman in the insurance fraud racket. Joe and Jane both meet Fender at a party at Pete's, and Fender is smitten with the young teacher. Fender's secretary Betty sees this, and feels her own agenda is threatened.

Joe is hired to do some work for Fender, and the following day he is to drive a car for Pete when he is setting fire to another store. Joe's job is to block the way for the fire trucks. Joe shares the plan with an undercover policeman, Murph, and after the fire is set, the cop steps in and extinguishes the fire before it grows out of control. All the goods are already removed from the store by Pete. Pete returns to the store and finds Murph at the scene. Pete shoots Murph, but more police arrive to the store, and a car chase ensues, where Joe and Pete ultimately manage to shake the police.

Fender realizes the police were warned and suspects Betty. Fender orders her to watch Pete by dating him, and so they go on a double date with Joe and Jane that night. Joe tells Jane about his undercover assignment on the way to the club. When Betty gets drunk she accidentally discloses the address where the furs are stored and after the dinner, Joe and Jane go there. Joe is unaware that Betty was ordered to slip the address to trap Joe.

Joe drives the drunk Pete home and manages to find the file from his predecessor in Pete's apartment. He takes Jane with him and returns to the warehouse where the furs are, alerting the police on the way. When Joe and the police arrive at the warehouse there are no furs in it. The police look at the file Joe brought and they find evidence implicating Pete in setting the fire. The police leave to arrest Pete, but Pete arrives to the warehouse with a gun. Fender is alerted of the situation by a night watchman and tries to get there as fast as he can, driving with Betty by his side.

Joe manages to take the gun from Pete, but Pete gets the gun from the night watchman and pursues Joe and Jane as they try to escape. Pete sets fire to the warehouse, trying to trap Joe and Jane inside. Fire trucks get the alarm and comes to the warehouse, and Fender crashes his car on the way, driving too fast. With the help of the firemen, Joe catches Pete and overpowers him, and the rest of the villains are caught. Joe and Jane continue dating each other.

== Cast ==
- Robert Lowery as Joe Martin
- Anne Gwynne as Jane Jennings
- Edward Brophy as Pete Purdy
- Marcia Mae Jones as Betty – Fender's Secretary
- Douglas Fowley as Frederick P. 'Fred' Fender
- Maude Eburne as Grandma
- William Forrest as Deputy Fire Chief / Narrator
- Steve Pendleton as Murph, the undercover man
- Byron Foulger as Thomas Peyson
- Matt McHugh as Hubbell
- Lelah Tyler as Mrs. Peyson
- Emmett Vogan as Al, Night Watchman
- John Maxwell as Detective
- Richard David as Junior Peyson

== Production ==
Filming began March 10, 1949. Location footage was shot in San Francisco.

Actor George Reeves did some dialogue directing on the film. (Reeves ad directed in theatre).

== Reception ==
The Los Angeles Times called the film "lively".
