= Too Many Winners =

1947 film by William Beaudine

- Directed by: William Beaudine
- Written by: Fred Myton; Scott Darling; Brett Halliday; John Sutherland
- Produced by: John Sutherland
- Starring: Hugh Beaumont; Trudy Marshall; Ralph Dunn; Claire Carleton
- Cinematography: Jack Greenhalgh
- Edited by: Harry Reynolds
- Music by: Alvin Levin
- Production company: Producers Releasing Corporation
- Distributed by: Producers Releasing Corporation
- Release date: May 24, 1947
- Running time: 61 minutes
- Country: United States
- Language: English

Too Many Winners is a 1947 American mystery crime film directed by William Beaudine and starring Hugh Beaumont, Trudy Marshall and Ralph Dunn. Made and released by Producers Releasing Corporation , it was one of a number of films featuring the private detective Michael Shayne.

== Plot ==
Private detective Michael Shayne and his girlfriend/secretary Phyllis are in the office ready to leave on a duck-hunting vacation but are puzzled when a mysterious stranger arrives who announces that he intended to offer a bribe to not take a certain unspecified case, but hearing that Shane is going away anyway, abruptly departs. The mystery deepens when Shayne is invited over by a Mayme Martin with an offer to sell certain valuable information which Shayne declines. Leaving Martin's, Shayne is ambushed by a pair of odd thugs under orders of their boss seeking to know what Martin told him, which was nothing; they beat up and leave Shayne in the city dump.

Now drawn in to an obvious situation, Shayne sends his reporter friend Tim Rourke to accept Martin's information offer, but instead Rourke encounters police and her murdered body.

It turns out that the mystery concerns criminal activity at the Santa Rosita racetrack. The president Albert Payson's track manager John Hardeman hires Shayne to solve a counterfeit ticket racket that is bankrupting the track. The printer for the legitimate tickets is a trusted company owned by Payson, and Hardeman alone decides on the tickets' secret daily design and code numbers.

The track offers one other lead. Gil Madden, owner of the Tribune, had long been trying to get the contract for printing the tickets. He had financed the purchase of the Tribune using as collateral a printing company he'd acquired from a prison inmate, a Theodore Ross.

Shayne recognizes Madden as the stranger who offered the bribe to drop the case and he won't answer questions. Madden's partner, photographer/engraver Ben Edwards, also refuses to be questioned.

As it turns out, Gil Madden is aka Theodore Ross and Ben Edwards is aka Claude Bates. Years ago they were convicted of together counterfeiting Irish sweepstakes tickets and sent to Joliet Penitentiary. Madden served a light sentence and was released but Edwards drew 20 to 50 and after two years, broke out. Edwards has acquired a wife and son who know nothing about his past.

Despite the efforts of Edwards to remake his life, inventing a new type of camera, sadly Hardeman figured out his identity and began blackmailing the escaped convict to force him to make the counterfeit racing tickets.

We are now at the point of the film where Hardeman fears Edwards will talk and directs his thugs to kill him, as he had ordered the death of Martin who knew about the blackmail. But just as he speaks this order into the phone, Edwards shows up to instead shoot and kill Hardeman; in turn as he is leaving, Edwards is shot and killed by Hardeman's thugs.

At the end, one thug reveals the other, Joe, as the killer of Martin and Edwards; Joe attacks and is shot by the other as police arrive and capture him. In the final scene, the police agree at Shane's request to spare Edwards' family from the truth, and Shane and Phyllis at last embark on their vacation.

== Cast ==
- Hugh Beaumont as Michael Shayne
- Trudy Marshall as Phyllis Hamilton
- Ralph Dunn as Det. Peter Rafferty
- Claire Carleton as Mayme Martin
- Charles Mitchell as Tim Rourke
- John Hamilton as Albert Payson
- Grandon Rhodes as John Hardeman
- Ben Welden as Gil Madden / Theodore Ross
- Byron Foulger as Ben Edwards / Claude Bates
- Jean Andren as Mary Edwards
- George Meader as Clarence

== Bibliography ==
- Marshall, Wendy L. William Beaudine: From Silents to Television. Scarecrow Press, 2005.
