= Hilda Stone =

American screenwriter

- Born: Hilda Laura Hess; August 2, 1905; Sierra Mojada, Mexico
- Died: March 4, 1992 (aged 86); Los Angeles, California, USA
- Occupation: Screenwriter
- Spouse(s): John Stone (div.); George Marton
- Children: Peter Stone

Hilda Laura Stone (occasionally credited by her birth name, Hilda Hess) was an American screenwriter active in the 1930s and 1940s.

== Biography ==
Hilda Laura Hess was born in Sierra Mojada, Mexico, to Louis Hess (a Bavarian Jewish merchant involved in mining) and Mollie Sanders; the family later spent time in El Paso. She graduated from El Paso High School and ended up working as a newspaper reporter for several years. By the 1920s, she had settled in Los Angeles, where she gained employment as a script reader in Fox's scenario department before working her way into a writing role. Her first credited screenplay was on 1934's Dos Más Uno Dos, a Spanish-language film.

In 1926, Hilda married fellow screenwriter John Stone. She and her husband—who went on to be a well-known producer at Fox—later collaborated on a number of films. Their son, Peter Stone, later became a screenwriter and acclaimed playwright. The pair divorced in 1949 after she eloped to Paris with writer George Marton. After the divorce, she retired form the business.

She lived at the Sierra Towers and died in Los Angeles on March 5, 1992, aged 86, and was interred in Hillside Memorial Park.

== Selected filmography ==
- They Live in Fear (1944)
- Girl in 313 (1940)
- Everybody's Baby (1939)
- Pardon Our Nerve (1939)
- Passport Husband (1938)
- Dos Más Uno Dos (1934)
