= Harry Reynolds (film editor) =

American film editor (1901–1971)

- Born: April 4, 1901; Fresno, California, United States
- Died: December 22, 1971 (aged 70); Hollywood, California, United States
- Occupation: Film editor

Harry Reynolds (April 4, 1901 – December 22, 1971) was an American film editor.

He edited London After Midnight (1927), The Unknown (1927) with Errol Taggart, West of Zanzibar (1928), Where East Is East (1929), Fallen Angel (1945), Charlie Chan in City in Darkness (1939), Mr. Moto in Danger Island (1939, where he also worked as the cutter, Killer at Large (1947), and Ben-Hur (1925) with Lloyd Nosler, Basil Wrangell, William Holmes and Ben Lewis.

He also edited Too Many Winners (1947), Killer at Large (1947) with Alfred DeGaetano, and Gas House Kids (1946).

== Filmography ==
- Nature's Strangest Creatures (1959)
- Pier 23 (1951)
- Roaring City (1951)
- Danger Zone (1951)
- Fingerprints Don't Lie (1951)
- The Noose Hangs High (1948)
- Gas House Kids Go West (1947)
- Killer at Large (1947)
- Too Many Winners (1947)
- The Brasher Doubloon (1947)
- Centennial Summer (1946)
- Fallen Angel (1945)
- Within These Walls (1945)
- Hangover Square (1945)
- Take It or Leave It (1944)
- Roger Touhy, Gangster (1944)
- The Undying Monster (1942)
- Little Tokyo, U.S.A. (1942)
- Accent on Love (1941)
- The Cowboy and the Blonde (1941)
- Dead Men Tell (1941)
- Murder Among Friends (1941)
- The Gay Caballero (1940)
- Charlie Chan's Murder Cruise (1940)
- Young as You Feel (1940)
- High School (1940)
- City in Darkness (1939)
- Quick Millions (1939)
- Mr. Moto in Danger Island (1939)
- Pardon Our Nerve (1939)
- Down on the Farm (1938)
- Safety in Numbers (1938)
- Island in the Sky (1938)
- Love on a Budget (1938)
- Manhattan Tower (1932)
- The Bachelor Father (1931)
- Remote Control (1930)
- The Sea Bat (1930)
- Their Own Desire (1929)
- The Thirteenth Chair (1929)
- The Girl in the Show (1929)
- Where East Is East (1929)
- Desert Nights (1929)
- West of Zanzibar (1928)
- Four Walls (1928)
- Beau Broadway (1928)
- The Big City (1928)
- London After Midnight (1927)
- The Unknown (1927)

== Bibliography ==
- Hanke, Ken (4 December 2013). A Critical Guide to Horror Film Series. Routledge. p. 392. ISBN 9781317928812.
- Mavis, Paul (1 May 2013). The Espionage Filmography: United States Releases, 1898 through 1999. McFarland Publishing. p. 470. ISBN 9781476604275.
