= Fingerprints Don't Lie =

1951 film

- Directed by: Sam Newfield
- Screenplay by: Orville Hampton
- Story by: Rupert Hughes
- Produced by: Sigmund Neufeld
- Starring: Richard Travis; Sheila Ryan; Margia Dean
- Cinematography: Jack Greenhalgh
- Edited by: Carl Pierson; Harry Reynolds
- Music by: Dudley Chambers; Bert Shefter
- Production company: Spartan Productions
- Distributed by: Lippert Pictures
- Release date: February 23, 1951 (U.S.)
- Running time: 57 minutes
- Country: United States
- Language: English

Fingerprints Don't Lie is a 1951 American crime film directed by Sam Newfield and starring Richard Travis, Sheila Ryan and Margia Dean. It was released by the independent distributor Lippert Pictures.

== Plot ==
At the trial of the alleged killer of the city's mayor, fingerprint expert Jim Stover provides evidence that seems likely to seal the killer's conviction and execution. Stover strongly believes in the validity of fingerprint evidence but begins to harbor doubts about the guilt of the accused man. With the assistance of the dead mayor's daughter Carolyn, Stover starts his own investigation to discover whether the defendant is being framed.

== Cast ==
- Richard Travis as James Stover
- Sheila Ryan as Carolyn Palmer
- Sid Melton as Hypo Dorton
- Tom Neal as Prosecuting Attorney
- Margia Dean as Nadine Connell
- Lyle Talbot as Police Lt. Grayson
- Michael Whalen as Police Commissioner Frank Kelso
- Richard Emory as Paul Moody
- Dee Tatum as Connie Duval
- George Eldredge as King Sullivan
- Rory Mallinson as Brad Evans
- Karl Davis as Rod Barenger
- Zon Murray as Defense Attorney
- Syra Marty as Syra, the Blonde Model
- Roy Butler as Bailiff
- Dick Gordon as Nightclub Patron
- Forbes Murray as Judge Edwin Monroe
- John Roy as Detective
- Larry Steers as Nightclub Patron
- Ferris Taylor as Mayor Wendell Palmer

== Reception ==
In a contemporary review for the New York Daily News, critic Dorothy Masters wrote: "The dramatics won't convince anybody, but the film does have a smattering of information on the methods employed in crime detection. It also has the dubious faculty of being able to provide some scantily clad females for promotional display in theatre lobbies—all of which is irrelevant to the plot and by no means as sensational as suggested."

== Bibliography ==
- Spicer, Andrew. Historical Dictionary of Film Noir. Scarecrow Press, 2010.
