= Come On, Leathernecks! =

1938 film directed by James Cruze

- Directed by: James Cruze
- Written by: Sidney Salkow; Dorrell McGowan; Stuart E. McGowan
- Produced by: Herman Schlom
- Starring: Richard Cromwell; Marsha Hunt; Edward Brophy
- Cinematography: Ernest Miller
- Edited by: Edward Mann
- Music by: Cy Feuer
- Production company: Republic Pictures
- Distributed by: Republic Pictures
- Release date: August 8, 1938
- Running time: 65 minutes
- Country: United States
- Language: English

Come On, Leathernecks! is a 1938 American sports action film directed by James Cruze and starring Richard Cromwell, Marsha Hunt and Edward Brophy. It was produced and distributed by Republic Pictures. The plot mixes football with the United States Marine Corps in the Philippines.

== Plot ==
Come On, Leathernecks! is a 1938 American action film that mixes football with the United States Marine Corps in the Philippines. The film is about a star football player at Annapolis who is torn between becoming a marine or a football player. The player's father wants him to follow the family pattern and join the Marines.

== Cast ==
- Richard Cromwell as Jimmy Butler
- Marsha Hunt as Valerie Taylor
- Edward Brophy as Max 'Curly' Maxwell
- Leon Ames as Otto Wagner / Baroni
- Bruce MacFarlane as Lt. Henry Dolan
- Robert Warwick as Colonel Butler
- Howard Hickman as Captain Felton
- James Bush as Dick Taylor
- Walter Miller as Coach Hank Wells
- Anthony Warde as Nick
- Harry Strang as Slats
- Noble "Kid" Chissell as Henchman
- Lester Dorr as Henchman
- Ralph Dunn as Capt. Niles
- Alan Ladd as Club Waiter
- Hugh Prosser as Marine
