= The Burning Cross =

1947 film directed by Walter Colmes

- Film poster
- Directed by: Walter Colmes
- Written by: Aubrey Wisberg
- Produced by: Walter Colmes
- Starring: Hank Daniels; Virginia Patton
- Cinematography: Walter Strenge
- Edited by: Jason Bernie
- Music by: Raoul Kraushaar
- Production company: Somerset Pictures
- Distributed by: Screen Guild Productions
- Release date: September 1, 1947
- Running time: 77 minutes
- Country: United States
- Language: English
- Budget: less than $100,000

The Burning Cross is a 1947 American drama film produced and directed by Walter Colmes. It was written by Aubrey Wisberg and released by Screen Guild Productions.

The film depicts Ku Klux Klan activities and was censored in Virginia and Detroit.

== Plot ==
War veteran Johnny Larrimer joins the Ku Klux Klan and comes to regard it as evil. When he betrays his Klan oath, he is brought before Klan officials for a mock trial and lynching. One of Johnny's friends, a government agent working under cover, alerts the state troopers. The Klan is routed, Johnny beats the Klan organizer into submission, and the law grants Johnny a light prison sentence in the wake of his efforts to break up the terrorist group.

== Cast ==
- Hank Daniels (Henry H. Daniels, Jr.) as Johnny Larrimer
- Virginia Patton as Doris Greene
- Dick Rich as Lud Harris
- Joel Fluellen as Charlie West
- John Fostini as Tony Areni
- Betty Roadman as Agatha Larimer
- Raymond Bond as Chester Larrimer
- Matt Willis as Mort Dauson - the Grand Dragon
- John Doucette as Toby Mason

== Production ==
The Burning Cross was an attempt to cash in on the new anti-racism cycle of films popular at the time (like Gentleman's Agreement and Crossfire).

Somerset Pictures was established in 1947 by Walter Colmes, Solly Levenstein, and Jake Milstein. It was their first movie. They signed an agreement with Robert L. Lippert's Screen Guild Productions to distribute the film.

Filming started in June 1947 at producer Jack Schwarz's new, ultra-modern Equity studio on Cahuenga Boulevard, originally the site of Metro-Goldwyn-Mayer's first studio. The low-budget production was completed in six days.

== Release ==
The producers planted small "teaser" ads in trade periodicals (not mentioning the actors, studio, or film title) showing a hooded vigilante on horseback. These ads, published over a matter of weeks, were an attempt to pique the curiosity of theater managers. Exhibitors with long memories would remember the controversy around D. W. Griffith's Klan-themed melodrama The Birth of a Nation and how profitable that venture had been. However, the ads may also have aroused resentment or hostility among Southern showmen. The New York Times referred to the film's sponsor, Screen Guild, as "a minor organization which can afford the risk of alienating the Southern market." "[The Burning Cross] cannot be shown in some theaters, particularly in the South," cautioned trade publisher Pete Harrison. "The story has been founded on facts gathered by Jack Cartwright while he was a reporter for a Denver, Colorado newspaper."

Trade reviewers were charitable, calling it a well-intentioned film that would generate great audience interest. Showmen's Trade Review said, "Though this has no name draw, the title and subject matter make it not only timely but excellent for advance exploitation. Correctly handled, the picture should bring in very satisfactory returns." Columnist William H. James commended the film: "Somerset Pictures deserves a salute for a courageously uninhibited exposé of the facts, factors, and warped psychology behind the Ku Klux Klan and other hatemongers."

The Burning Cross was banned in Virginia and Detroit. Screen Guild distributed its films through regional exchanges; Albert Dezel, handling the film in Michigan and Ohio, asked local and national officials to intercede on the film's behalf.
