= The Baron of Arizona =

1950 film

- Theatrical release poster
- Directed by: Samuel Fuller
- Screenplay by: Samuel Fuller
- Based on: 1949 article in The American Weekly by: Homer Croy; adapted from; material owned by; Sam White; first published in True
- Produced by: Carl Hittleman; Executive producer: Robert L. Lippert; Associate producer: Sam White
- Starring: Vincent Price; Ellen Drew
- Cinematography: James Wong Howe
- Edited by: Arthur Hilton
- Music by: Paul Dunlap
- Production company: Deputy Corporation
- Distributed by: Lippert Pictures
- Release dates: April 16, 1950 (Los Angeles); June 22, 1950 (New York)
- Running time: 97 minutes
- Country: United States
- Language: English
- Budget: $135,000

The Baron of Arizona is a 1950 American independent Western film directed by Samuel Fuller and starring Vincent Price and Ellen Drew.

The film concerns a master forger's attempted use of false documents to lay claim to the territory of Arizona late in the 19th century. It is based on the case of James Reavis, whose scheme came close to success, but many of the film's details are fictionalized.

== Plot ==
The notorious attempt by swindler James Reavis to claim the entire territory of Arizona as his own before it was granted statehood in 1912 is recounted years later by John Griff, who works for the Department of the Interior.

In 1872, Reavis goes to great lengths to forge documents in Spain and create the illusion that he had a legal right to claim Arizona. He begins by seeking Pepito Alvarez to inquire about Sofia, an infant abandoned by Reavis many years before. Reavis takes Sofia home with him, hires governess Loma Morales to refine her and then marries her, using fabricated proof that identifies Sofia as the rightful baroness of Arizona. The suspicious federal government, unable to disprove Reavis' claim, offers him $25 million for the rights to the land, but he declines.

Miller, the surveyor general, is sure that Reavis has somehow doctored the documents. He recruits the help of Griff, a forgery expert. After Reavis orders settlers and families to vacate the land, a displaced rancher tosses a bomb into his office. He is undeterred, so Pepito threatens to reveal that Sofia's parents were not Spanish land barons but native Indians.

Reavis is revealed as a charlatan. He manages to talk his way out of a lynching but ends up behind bars. After serving time, he is released and reunited with Sofia.

== Cast ==
- Vincent Price as James Reavis
- Ellen Drew as Sofia
- Vladimir Sokoloff as Pepito
- Beulah Bondi as Loma
- Reed Hadley as Griff
- Robert Barrat as Judge (as Robert H. Barrat)
- Robin Short as Lansing
- Tina Pine as Rita (as Tina Rome)
- Karen Kester as Sofia as a child
- Margia Dean as the Marquesa
- Jonathan Hale as the Governor
- Edward Keane as Miller
- Barbara Woodell as Mrs. Lansing
- I. Stanford Jolley as Mr. Richardson
- Fred Kohler Jr. as Demmings
- Tristram Coffin as McCleary
- Gene Roth as Father Guardian
- Angelo Rossitto as Angie – Gypsy (as Angelo Rosito)
- Ed East as Hank
- Joseph J. Greene as Mr. Gunther (as Joe Greene)

== Production ==
Director Samuel Fuller first heard of the story in the 1930s. Filming began on August 20, 1949 and continued for 15 days. Executive producer Robert L. Lippert allocated $100,000 for the lead role and spent $100,000 to promote the film. A print is preserved by the Museum of Modern Art.

The film marks one of the earliest credits for B-movie director Ed Wood, who worked as a stunt double.

== Reception ==
In a contemporary review for The New York Times, critic A. H. Weiler wrote: "[T]here is little drama or suspense in this costume number. The original script, turned out by Director Samuel Fuller, manages to be erudite on occasion, as do his central characters, but it is all done slowly and with no great distinction."

A review in the Los Angeles Times concluded: "Just what writer Samuel Fuller's sources were isn't told, but certainly he and star Vincent Price make the Baron a brilliantly resourceful, fascinating fellow, and his adventures absorbing".

Critic Mae Tinee of the Chicago Tribune wrote: "If Vincent Price didn't behave in quite such hammy fashion—his expressions seem limited to two, one, which might normally be provoked by acute indigestion, he generally uses to express emotion; the second is a silly sneer employed for all other occasions—this film might be more credible and entertaining. ... The direction is sloppy, especially in the finale ... The story, supposedly based on fact, has its points, and the supporting cast is excellent. It could have been a good movie—unfortunately, it just isn't.
