= They Live in Fear =

1944 film directed by Josef Berne

- Directed by: Josef Berne
- Screenplay by: Ruth Nussbaum; Samuel Ornitz; Wilfred H. Petitt; Michael L. Simmons; Hilda Stone
- Produced by: Jack Fier
- Cinematography: George Meehan
- Edited by: James Sweeney
- Production company: Columbia Pictures
- Distributed by: Columbia Pictures
- Release date: 6 October 1944 (USA)
- Running time: 64 mins

They Live in Fear is a 1944 American film starring Otto Kruger.

The film was known as America's Children. Filming was announced in August 1943. Otto Kruger joined the film in March 1944.

== Plot ==
A member of the Hitler Youth escapes to America.

== Cast ==
- Otto Kruger as Matthew Van Camp
- Clifford Severn as Paul Graffen
- Pat Parrish as Pat Daniels
- Jimmy Carpenter as Johnny Reynolds
- Erwin Kalser as Jan Dorchik
- Danny Jackson as Googy
