= Edward Brophy =

American actor (1895–1960)

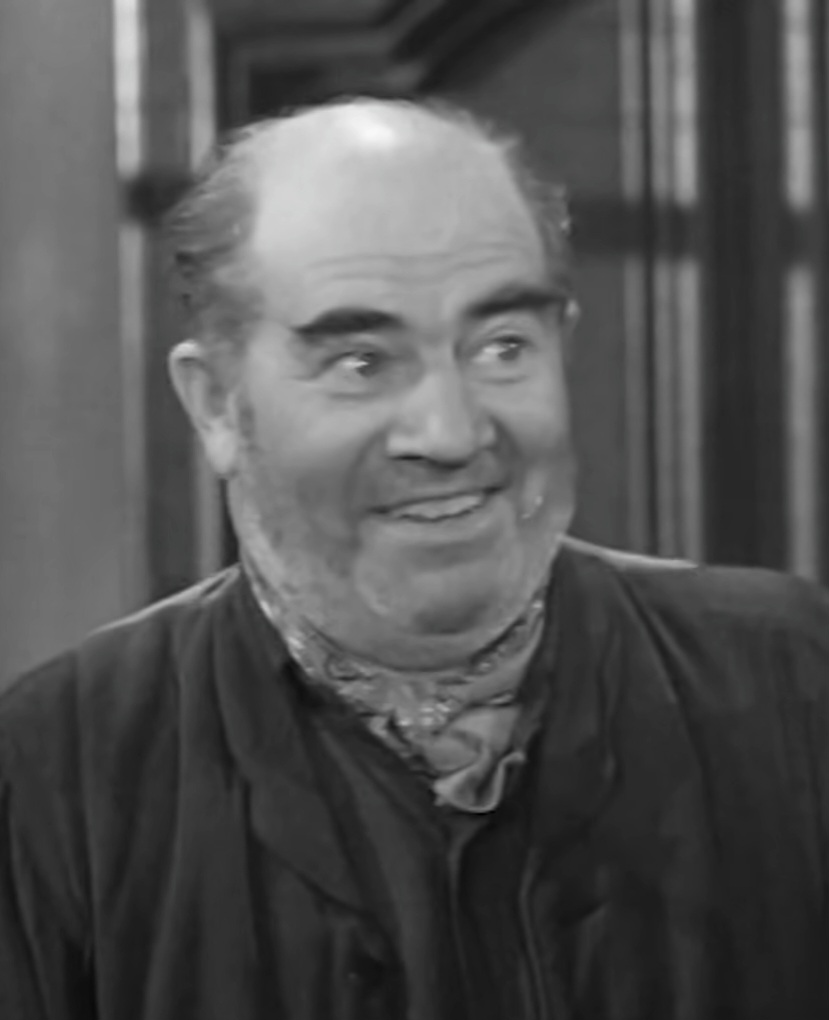
- Brophy in Renegade Girl (1946)
- Born: Edward Santree Brophy; February 27, 1895; New York City, U.S.
- Died: May 27, 1960 (aged 65); Pacific Palisades, California, U.S.
- Resting place: Woodlawn Memorial Cemetery
- Occupations: Actor; comedian
- Years active: 1920–1960
- Spouse: Ann S. Brophy (m. 1925)

Edward Santree Brophy (February 27, 1895 – May 27, 1960) was an American character actor and comedian, as well as an assistant director and second unit director during the 1920s. Small of build, balding, and raucous-voiced, he frequently portrayed dumb cops and gangsters, both serious and comic.

He is best remembered as the sidekick to The Falcon in the Tom Conway film series of the 1940s, and for voicing Timothy Q. Mouse in Walt Disney's Dumbo (1941).

== Early life ==
Edward Santree Brophy was born on February 27, 1895, in New York City and attended the University of Virginia.

== Career ==
His screen debut was in Yes or No? (1920). In 1928, with only a few minor film roles to his credit, Brophy was working as a production manager for Metro-Goldwyn-Mayer when he was on location with Buster Keaton for the feature film The Cameraman. An actor failed to show up, and rather than having to wait for the studio to send a substitute, Keaton recruited Brophy on the spot to take the actor's place. As two occupants of a bath-house, Brophy and Keaton attempt to undress and put on bathing suits while sharing a single tiny changing room. Each time Keaton attempts to hang his clothes on one hook, Brophy removes the clothes and hands them back to Keaton and gestures to the other hook. He manhandles the smaller, more slender Keaton, at one point picking him up by the feet and dumping him out of his trousers. Appearing only in this one brief scene, Brophy attracted enough attention to receive more and better roles.

Keaton used Brophy again in his military comedy Doughboys (1930), with Brophy as a loud-mouthed drill sergeant. This defined Brophy's screen persona as a Brooklyn-accented, streetwise character. His subsequent films for MGM cast him in the same vein: comic foils in four more Keaton features; the loyal fight manager in The Champ (1931); a circus proprietor in Freaks (1932); and as a hired gun in The Thin Man (1934).

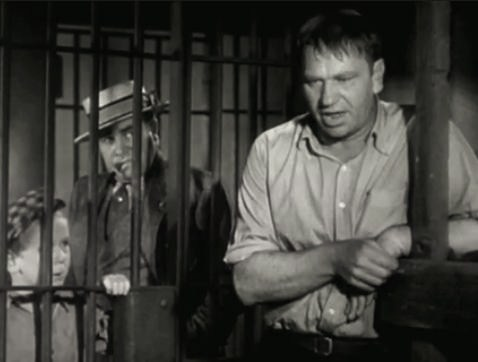
Edward Brophy (center) with Jackie Cooper and Wallace Beery in The Champ (1931)

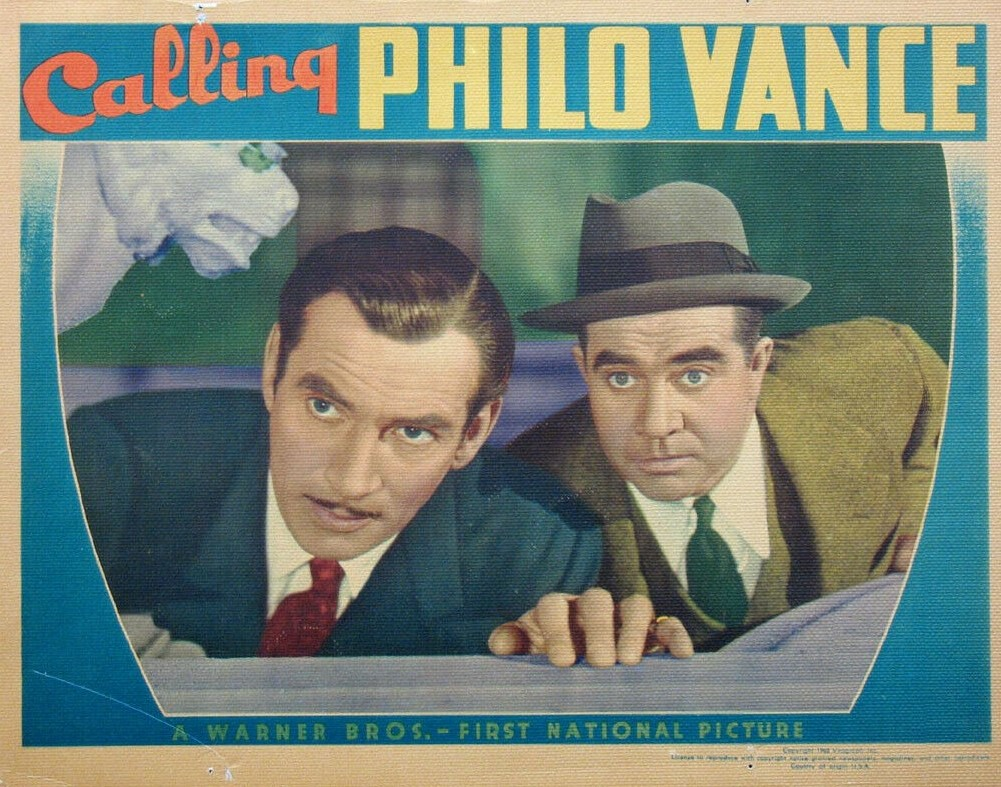
Calling Philo Vance (1940) Edward Brophy (pictured right) with James Stephenson

By 1940 Brophy was so identified as a Runyonesque character with a Brooklynese speech pattern that he was cast as the voice of Timothy Q. Mouse in Dumbo, even though he was uncredited for this role. Brophy worked steadily through the 1950s, in both featured roles and uncredited bits, almost always in light film fare. Very rarely was he called upon to display dramatic ability, as in the police procedural Arson, Inc. (1949), in which he played a potentially dangerous firebug. He also made several appearances in the films of director John Ford, notably as "Ditto" Boland in The Last Hurrah (1958), Brophy's last film.

Critic Leslie Halliwell described him thus, "American character actor, often a gangster or a very odd kind of valet; a rotund, cigar-chewing little man in a bowler hat, oddly likeable despite his pretence of toughness."

Brophy was the model for comic-book character Doiby Dickles, the cab-driving sidekick to Green Lantern in the 1940s.

== Death ==
Brophy died on May 27, 1960, during the production of Ford's Two Rode Together. (One source says Brophy "died while watching a prizefight on television.") He was 65.

== Filmography ==
Year	Film	Role	Ref.
1920	Yes or No?	Tom Martin	
1921	The Sign on the Door	Newspaper Photographer (uncredited)	
1927	Spring Fever	Golf Game Spectator (uncredited)	
1927	West Point	Team Manager (uncredited)	
1928	The Cameraman	Man in Bath-House (uncredited)	
1930	Free and Easy	Benny - The Stage Manager (uncredited)	
1930	Estrellados	assistant director (uncredited)	
1930	Our Blushing Brides	Joe Munsey	
1930	Doughboys	Sergeant Brophy	
1930	Those Three French Girls	Yank	
1930	Remote Control	Al	
1930	Paid	Burglar (uncredited)	
1931	Parlor, Bedroom and Bath	Detective	
1931	A Free Soul	Slouch (uncredited)	
1931	Sporting Blood	Newsreel Cameraman (uncredited)	
1931	A Dangerous Affair	Nelson	
1931	The Champ	Tim	
1931	The Big Shot	Minor Role (scenes deleted)	
1931	The Passionate Plumber	Man Outside Beauty Parlor (uncredited)	
1932	Freaks	as Rollo Brother	
1932	The Beast of the City	Police Dispatcher (uncredited)	
1932	Skyscraper Souls	Man in Elevator (uncredited)	
1932	Speak Easily	Reno	
1932	Prosperity	Ice Cream Salesman (uncredited)	
1932	Flesh	Dolan - a Referee	
1933	What! No Beer?	Spike Moran	
1933	Beer and Pretzels (Short)	Theater Manager (uncredited)	
1933	Broadway to Hollywood	Joe Mannion (uncredited)	
1933	Hello Pop! (Short)	Brophy (uncredited)	
1934	The Poor Rich	Flannigan	
1934	The Thin Man	Morelli	
1934	Paris Interlude	Ham	
1934	Hide-Out	Detective Britt	
1934	Have a Heart	Mac (uncredited)	
1934	Death on the Diamond	Grogan	
1934	Evelyn Prentice	Eddie Delaney	
1934	I'll Fix It	Tillie Tilson	
1934	Sequoia	Forest Ranger Pete (uncredited)	
1934	Forsaking All Others	(scenes deleted)	
1935	Devil Dogs of the Air	Minor Role (scenes deleted)	
1935	Shadow of Doubt	Fred Wilcox	
1935	The Whole Town's Talking	'Slugs' Martin	
1935	Naughty Marietta	Zeke	
1935	People Will Talk	Pete Ranse	
1935	Mad Love	Rollo	
1935	She Gets Her Man	Flash	
1935	China Seas	Wilbur Timmons	
1935	I Live My Life	Pete (uncredited)	
1935	1,000 Dollars a Minute	Benny Dolan	
1935	Remember Last Night?	Maxie	
1935	Show Them No Mercy!	Buzz	
1936	Strike Me Pink	Killer	
1936	Here Comes Trouble	Crowley	
1936	Woman Trap	George Meade	
1936	The Case Against Mrs. Ames	Sid	
1936	Kelly the Second	Ike Arnold	
1936	Spendthrift	Bill McGuire	
1936	Wedding Present	Squinty	
1936	All American Chump	Pudgy Murphy	
1936	Mr. Cinderella	Detective McNutt	
1936	Hideaway Girl	Bugs Murphy	
1936	Career Woman	Doc Curley	
1936	Great Guy	Pete Reilly	
1937	Oh, Doctor	Meg Smith	
1937	Jim Hanvey, Detective	Romo	
1937	The Soldier and the Lady	Packer	
1937	The Hit Parade	Mulrooney	
1937	The Great Gambini	'Butch'	
1937	Varsity Show	Mike Barclay	
1937	Trapped by G-Men	Lefty	
1937	The Girl Said No	Pick	
1937	The Last Gangster	'Fats' Garvey	
1937	Blossoms on Broadway	Mr. Prussic	
1938	A Slight Case of Murder	Lefty	
1938	Romance on the Run	Whitey Whitehouse	
1938	Hold That Kiss	Al	
1938	Gold Diggers in Paris	Mike Coogan	
1938	Passport Husband	Spike	
1938	Come On, Leathernecks!	Max 'Curly' Maxwell	
1938	Vacation from Love	Barney Keenan, Band Leader	
1938	Gambling Ship	Cuthbert Innocent	
1939	You Can't Cheat an Honest Man	Corbett	
1939	Pardon Our Nerve	Nosey Nelson	
1939	Society Lawyer	Max	
1939	For Love or Money	Sleeper	
1939	The Kid from Kokomo	Eddie Black	
1939	Golden Boy	Roxy Lewis	
1939	Mr. Smith Goes to Washington	Newspaper employee (uncredited)	
1939	Kid Nightingale	Mike Jordon	
1939	The Amazing Mr. Williams	Buck Moseby	
1939	The Big Guy	Dippy	
1940	Calling Philo Vance	Ryan	
1940	Alias the Deacon	Stuffy	
1940	Golden Gloves	Potsy Brill	
1940	The Great Profile	Sylvester	
1940	Dance, Girl, Dance	Dwarfie Humblewinger	
1940	Sandy Gets Her Man	Fireman Junior	
1940	The Invisible Woman	Bill	
1941	Sleepers West	George Trautwein	
1941	Thieves Fall Out	Rork	
1941	The Bride Came C.O.D.	Hinkle	
1941	A Dangerous Game	Bugs	
1941	Nine Lives Are Not Enough	Officer Slattery	
1941	Buy Me That Town	Ziggy	
1941	Dumbo	Timothy Q. Mouse (voice, uncredited)	
1941	The Gay Falcon	Officer Bates	
1941	Steel Against the Sky	Pete Evans	
1942	All Through the Night	Joe Denning	
1942	Broadway	Porky	
1942	Larceny, Inc.	Weepy Davis	
1942	Madame Spy	Mike Reese	
1943	Lady Bodyguard	Harry Gargan	
1943	Air Force	Marine Sgt. J.J. Callahan	
1943	Destroyer	Casey	
1943	A Scream in the Dark	Eddie Tough	
1944	Cover Girl	Joe - Cafe Owner (uncredited)	
1944	It Happened Tomorrow	Jake Shomberg	
1944	A Night of Adventure	Steve	
1944	The Thin Man Goes Home	Brogan	
1945	See My Lawyer	Otis Fillmore	
1945	I'll Remember April	Shadow	
1945	Wonder Man	Torso	
1945	Penthouse Rhythm	Bailey	
1945	The Falcon in San Francisco	Goldy Locke	
1946	Girl on the Spot	Fingers Foley	
1946	Swing Parade of 1946	Moose	
1946	Sweetheart of Sigma Chi	Artie	
1946	The Falcon's Adventure	Goldie Locke	
1946	Renegade Girl	Bob Crandall	
1947	It Happened on 5th Avenue	Cecil Felton	
1949	Arson, Inc.	Pete Purdy	
1951	Danger Zone	Prof. Frederick Simpson Schicker	
1951	Roaring City	'Professor' Frederick Simpson Schicker	
1951	Pier 23	Prof. Shicker	
1956	Bundle of Joy	Dance Contest Judge	
1958	The Last Hurrah	'Ditto' Boland	
1960	The Slowest Gun in the West (TV Movie)	The Bartender	
1961	Two Rode Together	Minor Role (uncredited, final role)	
