= Wildfire (1945 film) =

1945 film

- Directed by: Robert Emmett Tansey
- Written by: Frances Kavanaugh
- Based on: story by W.C. Tuttle
- Produced by: William B. David executive Robert L. Lippert
- Starring: Bob Steele
- Cinematography: Marcel Le Picard
- Edited by: Charles Henkel Jr.
- Production company: Action Pictures
- Distributed by: Screen Guild Productions (US); Exclusive (UK)
- Release date: July 18, 1945 (United States)
- Running time: 1 hour, 17 seconds
- Country: United States
- Language: English
- Budget: $35,000
- Box office: $350,000

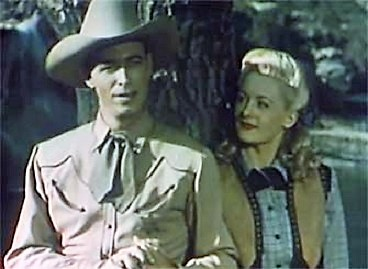
Eddie Dean and Virginia Maples in Wildfire (1945)

Wildfire, also known as Wildfire: The Story of a Horse in the United Kingdom, is a 1945 American Cinecolor Western film directed by Robert Emmett Tansey and starring Bob Steele.

It was an early film production from Robert L. Lippert.

Its sequel The Return of Wildfire was directed by Ray Taylor and starred Richard Arlen.

== Plot ==
A gang led by Pete Fanning rustles horses from local ranchers and places the blame on a wild stallion named Wildfire. Two horse-traders, "Happy" Haye and "Alkali" Jones, arrive in the area and quickly come into conflict with Fanning and his men. When Alkali is shot, Happy manages to capture the outlaws; however, Judge Polson releases them, dismisses Sheriff Johnny Deal from his post, and attempts to have Happy arrested for the rustling. Happy escapes, and he and the former sheriff set out to expose the true culprits and clear their names.

== Cast ==
- Bob Steele as "Happy" Haye
- Sterling Holloway as "Alkali" Jones
- John Miljan as Pete Fanning
- Eddie Dean as Sheriff Johnny Deal
- Virginia Maples as Judy Gordon
- Sarah Padden as Aunt Agatha
- Gene Alsace as Henchman Buck Perry
- Francis Ford as Ezra Mills
- William Farnum as Judge Polson
- William 'Wee Willie' Davis as Henchman Moose Harris

== Soundtrack ==
- Eddie Dean – "On the Banks of the Sunny San Juan" (Written by Glenn Strange and Eddie Dean)
- Eddie Dean – "By the Sleepy Rio Grande"

== See also ==
- List of films about horses
