= Jack Leewood =

American movie producer and director

Jack Leewood (1913–2004) was an American producer and director. He worked at Allied Artists then for Robert L. Lippert for a number of years.

== Select credits ==
- Thundering Jets (1958) – producer
- The Alligator People (1959) – producer
- 13 Fighting Men (1960) – producer
- Thunder Island (1963) – producer, director
- Dallas Cowboys Cheerleaders (1979) – producer
