= Lippert Pictures =

American film production and distribution company

Lippert Pictures was an American film production and distribution company controlled by Robert L. Lippert.

== History ==
Robert L. Lippert (1909–1976) was a successful exhibitor, owning a chain of movie theaters in California and Oregon. He was frustrated that the Hollywood studios concentrated on making big, expensive pictures that commanded premium rental fees. He felt there was a market for smaller, cheaper feature films intended for neighborhood theaters in smaller situations.

He called his new production company Action Pictures, and his first film, Wildfire: The Story of a Horse (1945) was an outdoor adventure filmed in then-novel Cinecolor. Reception was encouraging enough for the ambitious Lippert to expand his operations. In 1946 he joined forces with independent producer Edward Finney to create Screen Guild Productions.

Lippert's timing was excellent. By 1946 most of the Hollywood studios had abandoned low-budget productions and were making fewer films, leaving scores of actors and technicians underemployed. Lippert came to their rescue, offering them jobs at comparatively low salaries. Thus many of Lippert's features boasted familiar, famous-name casts: Veronica Lake, Zachary Scott, Buster Keaton, George Reeves, Ralph Byrd, Adele Jergens, Jean Parker, Vincent Price, Stuart Erwin, Don "Red" Barry, Robert Alda, Wally Vernon, Anne Gwynne, Jean Porter, Tom Neal, Russell Hayden, and other "star" names with marquee value.

Lippert also called upon certain character actors to play incidental roles in his films: Reed Hadley, Margia Dean, Mara Lynn, Jack Reitzen, Michael Whalen, and Phil Arnold among them. The most prolific was Sid Melton, almost always playing wisecracking cab drivers, sad-sack soldiers, or streetwise characters. Melton was even given a leading role in the comedy feature Stop That Cab (1951).

In February 1949 Lippert reorganized Screen Guild and renamed it Lippert Pictures. The studio received surprisingly good notices for a series of dramatic features written by Samuel Fuller; the western I Shot Jesse James, the historical tale The Baron of Arizona, and the military drama The Steel Helmet won special praise.

Producers Boris Morros and William LeBaron teamed to produce a new version of Victor Herbert's Babes in Toyland, planning to release it through Screen Guild. Along with the screen rights, they inherited the 1934 movie version starring Laurel and Hardy. The remake was never filmed, so Lippert took over the Laurel and Hardy version (retitling it March of the Wooden Soldiers) and reissued it in 1950.

In the early 1950s, Lippert struck an American distribution deal for Exclusive Films of Britain. The success of this company, subsequently renamed Hammer Films, boosted Lippert's fortunes until the British outfit left him to begin signing deals with American major studios.

In 1956 Lippert signed a deal with 20th Century-Fox to produce films under the name Regal Films, often westerns or horror pictures, for Fox to distribute.

== See also ==
- B-movie
- List of American independent films

== Bibliography ==
- Davis, Blair. The Battle for the Bs: 1950s Hollywood and the Rebirth of Low-Budget Cinema. Rutgers University Press, 2012.
- MacGillivray, Scott. Laurel and Hardy: From the Forties Forward. iUniverse, 2009.
- McGee, Mark Thomas. Talk's Cheap, Action's Expensive - the Films of Robert L. Lippert. BearManor Media, 2014.
