= List of Tales of Wells Fargo episodes =

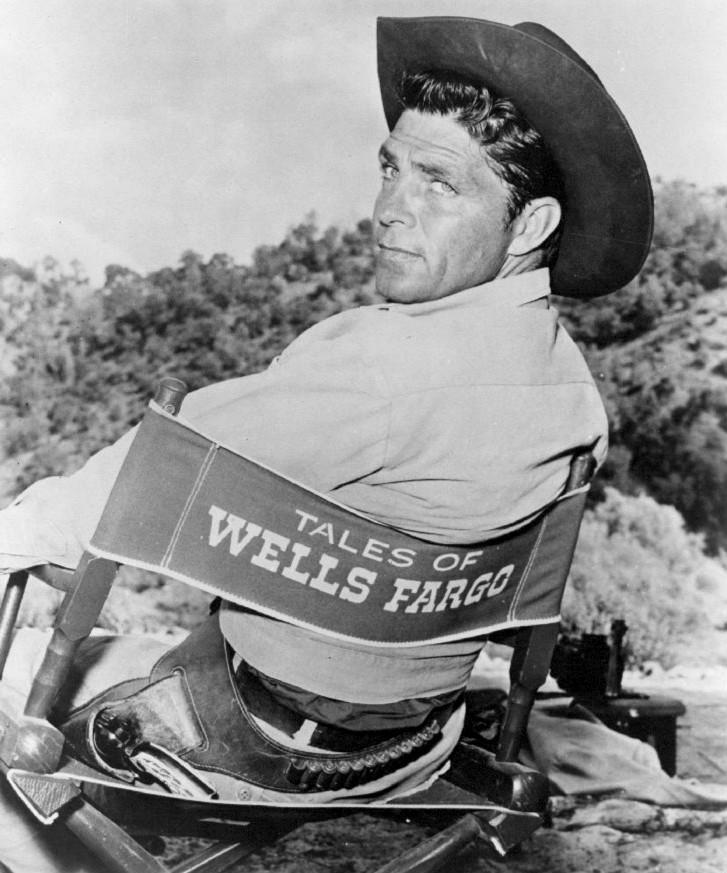
Dale Robertson in 1959

Tales of Wells Fargo is an American Western television series starring Dale Robertson in 201 episodes that aired from 1957 to 1962 on NBC. Produced by Revue Productions, the series aired in a half-hour format until its final season, when it expanded to a full hour and switched from black-and-white to color.

== Series overview ==
Season	Episodes	Originally released		Rank	Average viewership (in millions)	Run Time	Color
Season	Episodes	First released	Last released	Rank	Average viewership (in millions)	Run Time	Color
1	14	March 18, 1957	July 8, 1957	3	14.8	30 min	black & white
2	38	September 9, 1957	May 26, 1958	7	13.3	30 min	black & white
3	39	September 8, 1958	June 15, 1959	Not in top 30	N/A	30 min	black & white
4	37	September 7, 1959	May 30, 1960	Not in top 30	N/A	30 min	black & white
5	39	September 5, 1960	July 10, 1961	Not in top 30	N/A	30 min	black & white
6	34	September 30, 1961	June 2, 1962	Not in top 30	N/A	60 min	color

== Episodes ==
=== Season 1 (1957) ===
Season 1 consisted of 30-minute episodes in black-and-white airing 8:30–9 p.m. on Monday nights.

No. overall	No. in season	Title	Directed by	Written by	Original release date
1	1	"The Thin Rope"	Leslie H. Martinson	N. B. Stone Jr.	March 18, 1957
Wells Fargo agent Jim Hardie rides with a stagecoach driver who proves reckless in the job and hides a dangerous secret. Featuring Chuck Connors.
2	2	"The Hasty Gun"	Leslie H. Martinson	Dwight Newton	March 25, 1957
Hardie stands up for a beleaguered marshal, known for his hasty tactics, in a town convinced his time in charge is over. Featuring Rusty Lane.
3	3	"Alder Gulch"	Allen H. Miner	Frank Gruber	April 8, 1957
Hardie goes undercover to undermine an outlaw gang's plan to take over the town of Alder Gulch. Featuring Lee Van Cleef.
4	4	"The Bounty"	George Waggner	George Slavin	April 15, 1957
Hardie travels to Canada to pay a bounty for a slain outlaw only he can identify.
5	5	"A Time to Kill"	Jerry Hopper	William F. Leicester	April 22, 1957
A young boy discovers his late father may have held up a Wells Fargo stagecoach, but is determined to prove his innocence with Hardie's help.
6	6	"Shotgun Messenger"	Lewis R. Foster	Sloan Nibley	May 7, 1957
Hardie hires a shotgun messenger for a new Wells Fargo line, only to learn he's the son of a disgraced company driver who may have been involved in a heist, and whose compatriots are determined to strike again. Featuring Michael Landon and Walter Sande.
7	7	"The Lynching"	Allen H. Miner	Story by : William Heuman; Teleplay by : William F. Leicester	May 13, 1957
A sheepherder rescues a lost young girl, but is branded a kidnapper by the townspeople. Hardie works to convince the people of his innocence before mob law delivers its harsh verdict. Featuring Claude Akins.
8	8	"Renegade Raiders"	George Waggner	William F. Leicester	May 20, 1957
Hardie investigates how a local Cheyenne tribe is being supplied arms, and determines a rogue Wells Fargo agent is their source. Featuring Denver Pyle.
9	9	"Rio Grande"	Sidney Salkow	John K. Butler	June 3, 1957
Featuring Russell Johnson.
10	10	"Sam Bass"	Lewis R. Foster	Story by : Frank Gruber; Teleplay by : Steve Fisher	June 10, 1957
Hardie is tasked to infiltrate the gang of noted outlaw Sam Bass (Chuck Connors). With Michael Landon.
11	11	"The Hijackers"	John English	N. B. Stone Jr.	June 17, 1957
A Wells Fargo stagecoach and its occupants go missing in the badlands. Featuring Jack Elam.
12	12	"Stage to Nowhere"	Sidney Salkow	Steve Fisher	June 24, 1957
Hardie escorts a prisoner to trial and is attacked by the outlaw's gang, but it puts in harm's way the outlaw's own family. Featuring Walter Coy.
13	13	"Jesse James"	George Waggner	Dwight Newton	July 1, 1957
Jesse James (Hugh Beaumont) and his gang rob a Wells Fargo train shipment, and Hardie goes undercover to track down them and the money. With Bobby Jordan as Bob Ford.
14	14	"The Silver Bullets"	Sidney Salkow	Story by : Frederic Louis Fox; Teleplay by : William F. Leicester & Frederic Lewis Fox	July 8, 1957
Hardie investigates the death of a Wells Fargo agent and the disappearance of $15k, and learns the town's roulette tables may have had a hand in all of it. Featuring Douglas Kennedy, James Seay, and Pamela Duncan

=== Season 2 (1957–58) ===
Season 2 consisted of 30-minute episodes in black-and-white airing 8:30–9 p.m. on Monday nights.

No. overall	No. in season	Title	Directed by	Written by	Original release date
15	1	"Belle Starr"	Earl Bellamy	Frank Gruber	September 9, 1957
Hardie's stagecoach is robbed by outlaw Belle Starr and her gang, so he ventures out to bring her to justice. Featuring Jeanne Cooper as Belle Starr.
16	2	"Two Cartridges"	James Neilson	Story by : Stewart Edward White; Teleplay by : William F. Leicester	September 16, 1957
Featuring Jim Davis
17	3	"Apache Gold"	Earl Bellamy	Sam Peckinpah	September 23, 1957
Hardie joins a father searching for his son in the dangerous Superstition Mountains.
18	4	"John Wesley Hardin"	Lewis R. Foster	Steve Fisher	September 30, 1957
Featuring Lyle Bettger as John Wesley Hardin, with Frank Ferguson.
19	5	"The Target"	Franklin Adreon	William F. Leicester	October 7, 1957
A Pony Express rider is killed during a delivery, and Hardie sets out to lure the killer into the open. Featuring Paul Henderson as Ike Clanton.
20	6	"The Feud"	Earl Bellamy	William F. Leicester	October 14, 1957
A family feud between the Brundage's and the McCloud's complicates a right-of-way deal Jim Hardie needs to negotiate for the company.
21	7	"Billy the Kid"	Earl Bellamy	Frank Gruber	October 21, 1957
Hardie enlists the aid of Billy the Kid (Robert Vaughn) in a stagecoach holdup after The Kid helps a stranded passenger. With Addison Richards as Lew Wallace.
22	8	"The Auction"	Earl Bellamy	Steve Fisher	October 28, 1957
Featuring the first appearance of Edgar Buchanan as Bob Dawson, an old-time outlaw bidding on a strange old suitcase at a Wells Fargo auction which goes dangerous awry.
23	9	"Hank (aka Chips)"	Earl Bellamy	Steve Fisher	November 4, 1957
A dog is stolen off a Wells Fargo stagecoach and Hardie sets out to find it and understand why.
24	10	"Man in the Box"	Earl Bellamy	Lewis R. Foster	November 11, 1957
After a rash of daring holdups and heists, Hardie is tasked along with fellow agents to set a trap for the Stillwell gang.
25	11	"The Kid"	Earl Bellamy	Story by : Dwight Newton; Teleplay by : Steve Fisher	November 18, 1957
Hardie serves as defense for Tad Cameron (Michael Landon, reprising his role from season 1's Shotgun Messenger), who is on trial for killing a man. Featuring Byron Foulger.
26	12	"The Barbary Coast"	Earl Bellamy	William F. Leicester	November 25, 1957
Hardie has to investigate a ship captain for the company & friend, who has allegedly killed another agent and stolen $20k worth of jade from Wells Fargo.
27	13	"Ride with the Killer"	Earl Bellamy	Dwight Newton	December 2, 1957
28	14	"The Inscrutable Man"	Earl Bellamy	Frank Gruber	December 9, 1957
29	15	"The General"	Earl Bellamy	Lee Loeb	December 16, 1957
A bigoted army general, tasked with making peace with the Sioux, is escorted by Hardie to his meeting, but a group of rogue settlers are out to ensure the general never makes it to that meeting. Featuring Paul Fix as Lt. General Philip Sheridan, and Whit Bissell.
30	16	"Laredo"	Earl Bellamy	Steve Fisher	December 23, 1957
Hardie spends his Christmas tracking gunrunners near the Mexico border.
31	17	"The Witness"	Earl Bellamy	Story by : Joel Murcott; Teleplay by : William F. Leicester	December 30, 1957
A doctor is murdered in the dark of night by outlaws during a Wells Fargo robbery, and Hardie must investigate a nervous town to find the culprits. Featuring Will Wright.
32	18	"Doc Bell"	Earl Bellamy	William F. Leicester	January 7, 1958
Featuring the first appearance of Edward Platt as Doc Bell, as Hardie goes undercover as a fellow escaped convict, to determine where the money from a stagecoach robbery is.
33	19	"Stage West"	Earl Bellamy	Buckley Angell	January 13, 1958
Wells Fargo is contracted to deliver a witness to authorities, and takes over personally when the private detective (Stafford Repp) is killed by outlaws out to silence her. Featuring Darlene Fields.
34	20	"Hoss Tamer"	Earl Bellamy	Frank Gruber and L. Ron Hubbard	January 20, 1958
A young drifter comes into town and falls prey to a malicious horse trainer (Walter Coy) determined to rob the local Wells Fargo office.
35	21	"Hide Jumpers"	Earl Bellamy	W. R. Cox	January 27, 1958
36	22	"The Walking Mountain"	Earl Bellamy	Story by : John Solon; Teleplay by : N.B. Stone Jr.	February 3, 1958
Hardie is sent to investigate a gold mine operation linked to recent claims Wells Fargo is stealing gold from their own shipments. Featuring Claude Akins.
37	23	"Bill Longley"	Earl Bellamy	Martin Berkeley & Clark E. Reynolds	February 10, 1958
Featuring Steve McQueen as gunfighter Bill Longley.
38	24	"The Prisoner"	Earl Bellamy	Steve Fisher	February 17, 1958
Bob Dawson (Edgar Buchanan) is placed in Hardie's custody & promised parole, as he may be the only person able to find a kidnapped U.S. Senator.
39	25	"Dr. Alice"	Earl Bellamy	Martin Berkeley & Clark E. Reynolds	February 23, 1958
A jaded doctor (Diane Brewster) disillusioned with the West after the death of her husband finds leaving difficult after she is taken hostage by outlaws who are in need of her expertice.
40	26	"The Sooners"	Earl Bellamy	Martin Berkeley & Clark E. Reynolds	March 3, 1958
When an agent goes missing after a land rush in Oklahoma, Hardie must determine his whereabouts in the new town, and his horse may be the one clue to learning of his fate.
41	27	"Alias Jim Hardie"	Earl Bellamy	Story by : Robert Giles; Teleplay by : Martin Berkeley & Clark E. Reynolds	March 10, 1958
A Wells Fargo clerk (Phyllis Coates) has a hand in a particular heist, its success reliant on the ambush of the famed Jim Hardie and the theft of his credentials.
42	28	"The Johnny Ringo Story"	Earl Bellamy	William F. Leicester	March 17, 1958
Despite being in custody, outlaw Johnny Ringo (Paul Richards) is determined to get home to care for his dying sister.
43	29	"The Newspaper"	Earl Bellamy	Steve Fisher	March 24, 1958
A rival stage line causes problems for the town of Madden, as Hardie encounters its fierce owner and the town that is cruelly under her control. Featuring Claire Du Brey.
44	30	"Special Delivery"	Earl Bellamy	Samuel A. Peeples	March 31, 1958
An Indian attack traps the passengers of a Wells Fargo stagecoach in a remote location, including Hardie, an Army officer up for court-martial, a married couple and a baby.
45	31	"Deadwood"	Boris Sagal	Martin Berkeley & Clark E. Reynolds	April 7, 1958
Hardie investigates a robbery in Deadwood, and realizes the outlaw being accused is not his culprit at all. Featuring Mari Aldon, Richard Crane and Roy Barcroft.
46	32	"The Gun"	Earl Bellamy	Samuel A. Peeples	April 14, 1958
During a shootout with outlaws, Hardie kills a man who was not part of the robbery. He returns the man to his home and encounters a vengeful family. Featuring Jeanette Nolan.
47	33	"The Reward"	Earl Bellamy	Martin Berkeley & Clark E. Reynolds	April 21, 1958
Hardie travels to Bridger to deliver a reward check, to discover the man has mysteriously vanished and that certain townspeople are hiding a truth behind it.
48	34	"The Pickpocket"	Earl Bellamy	D.D. Beauchamp	April 28, 1958
Hardie meets a kindly pickpocket amidst a train holdup, and together they track down and foil the outlaws.
49	35	"Scapegoat"	Earl Bellamy	William F. Leicester	May 5, 1958
The murder of a Wells Fargo agent leads many to suspect a town's new teacher (Bruce Bennett), an ex-convict, is the culprit. But Hardie, aided by a student, are not so convinced.
50	36	"The Renegade"	Earl Bellamy	A.I. Bezzerides	May 12, 1958
A man's desire to escape his problematic family leads him to employment with Wells Fargo as a shotgun messenger, and Hardie is sent to determine if this bodes well for the stagecoach line or not. Featuring John Anderson.
51	37	"The Break"	Earl Bellamy	Story by : Howard J. Green; Teleplay by : Samuel A. Peeples	May 19, 1958
Hardie pretends to be the outlaw Jesse James in order to coerce a young outlaw into leading him to his gang who've murdered a Wells Fargo agent. Featuring Gene Roth.
52	38	"The Sniper"	Earl Bellamy	Frank Gruber	May 26, 1958
A Wells Fargo agent is murdered by a sniper's bullet right in front of Jim Hardie, and his investigation leads Hardie down a road of dangerous secrets. Featuring Harold J. Stone and Olan Soule.

=== Season 3 (1958–59) ===
Season 3 consisted of 30-minute episodes in black-and-white airing 8:30–9 p.m. on Monday nights.

No. overall	No. in season	Title	Directed by	Written by	Original release date
53	1	"The Gambler"	Earl Bellamy	Dwight Newton	September 8, 1958
A young man (Tom Pittman) released from prison stirs up trouble when his stagecoach breaks down in his old hometown, but a planned robbery may complicate things even further for him.
54	2	"The Manuscript"	Earl Bellamy	Steve Fisher	September 15, 1958
The paroled Bob Dawson (Edgar Buchanan) comes into trouble when word of his "notorious" life story's manuscript puts his life in danger.
55	3	"White Indian"	Earl Bellamy	Sid Harris & Betty Hopkins	September 22, 1958
A young Indian boy is cast out from his Choctow tribe, as Jim Hardie investigates if he is in fact the child of a family killed in a Wells Fargo stagecoach slaughter several years earlier. Featuring Neil Hamilton.
56	4	"The Golden Owl"	Earl Bellamy	Story by : Robert Giles; Teleplay by : Martin Berkeley & Clarke E. Reynolds	September 29, 1958
Hardie tries to deliver a fabled Chinese golden owl to its new owner but is embroiled in trouble with outlaws.
57	5	"The Faster Gun"	Earl Bellamy	Samuel A. Peeples	October 6, 1958
Jim Hardie is shot on duty by outlaw Johnny Reno (Tom Neal) and recovers, but despite a promotion he itches to get back in the field to stopping Reno once and for all.
58	6	"Butch Cassidy"	Earl Bellamy	D.D. Beauchamp & Mary M. Beauchamp	October 13, 1958
Hardie encounters a released Butch Cassidy (Charles Bronson) on a train heading west and offers him a job with the company. But an old colleague (James Coburn) also tries to convince Cassidy to help him rob the train.
59	7	"End of the Trail"	Earl Bellamy	Martin Berkeley & Clarke Reynolds	October 20, 1958
Hardie negotiates with the Pawnees to allow the construction of a stagecoach road through the Dakota Black Hills, while also dealing with a road crew whose impatience threatens to endanger them all.
60	8	"A Matter of Honor"	Earl Bellamy	Paul Savage	November 3, 1958
A young Cheyenne man working for Wells Fargo becomes a town's target when men of his tribe rob the stagecoach. Featuring King Calder.
61	9	"The Most Dangerous Man Alive"	Earl Bellamy	Samuel A. Peeples	November 10, 1958
Featuring Claude Akins.
62	10	"The Gunfighter"	Earl Bellamy	Dwight Newton	November 17, 1958
Featuring Lyle Bettger as John Wesley Hardin.
63	11	"The Deserter"	Earl Bellamy	Dwight Newton	November 24, 1958
An ex-Army officer, who deserted in disgrace, is suspected of a series of robberies, but Hardie determines the origins of his desertion link others to these robberies.
64	12	"The Killer"	Earl Bellamy	Barney Slater	December 1, 1958
Hardie escorts a U.S. Senator (Paul Fix), who has enraged certain locals and lead them to hire hitmen to deal with the Senator once & for all. Featuring Paul Burke.
65	13	"The Counterfeiters"	Earl Bellamy	Martin Berkeley & Clarke Reynolds	December 8, 1958
Hardie goes undercover to find a group of counterfeiters defrauding Wells Fargo out of thousands of dollars in fake bills of exchange. Featuring Milton Frome.
66	14	"Cow Town"	Earl Bellamy	N.B. Stone Jr.	December 15, 1958
Featuring Guinn "Big Boy" Williams.
67	15	"The Happy Tree"	Earl Bellamy	Samuel A. Peeples	December 22, 1958
A convicted killer asks Hardie to see to it his son does not follow his path into lawlessness. Featuring Bob Steele and Rusty Lane.
68	16	"The Dealer"	Earl Bellamy	A.I. Bezzerides	December 29, 1958
Hardie comes to the aid of settlers moving through Dodge City. Featuring Vic Perrin and Johnny Crawford.
69	17	"Showdown Trail"	Earl Bellamy	Martin Berkeley & Clarke Reynolds	January 5, 1959
An outlaw family tries to rescue one of their own from Hardie's custody by any means necessary. Featuring Gloria Talbott and Will Wright.
70	18	"Luke Frazer"	Earl Bellamy	Thomas T. Flynn & Dwight Newton	January 12, 1959
Hardie must deal not only with finding & escorting Luke Frazer to justice, but also with a vengeful family out to kill Frazer, Frazer's old gang, and Frazer's younger brother who is misguidedly trying to live up to Luke's legacy. Featuring John Hart.
71	19	"Wild Cargo"	Earl Bellamy	Story by : Steve Fisher; Teleplay by : Dwight Newton	January 19, 1959
A stagecoach trip through Oro Gulch introduces Jim Hardie to 4 dancers on their way to the next town, but a series of robberies appears to be linked to one of them. Featuring Monica Lewis, Adele Mara, Dorothy Partington and Nancy Kilgas.
72	20	"The Cleanup"	Earl Bellamy	Martin Berkeley & Clarke Reynolds	January 26, 1959
Jim Hardie investigates the murder of a Wells Fargo agent in a wild town where an embittered old sheriff is the only form of justice.
73	21	"Fort Massacre"	Earl Bellamy	Story by : David Chandler; Teleplay by : Dwight Newton and David Chandler	February 2, 1959
Hardie delivers a payroll to a fort under Indian attack.
74	22	"The Town That Wouldn't Talk"	Earl Bellamy	Jack Laird & Wilton Schiller	February 9, 1959
While investigating the disappearance of a Wells Fargo agent, Hardie discovers that something terrible is afoot in a quiet town in Dakota territory. Featuring Bill Erwin and Byron Foulger.
75	23	"Lola Montez"	Earl Bellamy	Martin Berkeley & Clarke Reynolds	February 16, 1959
Featuring Rita Moreno.
76	24	"The Branding Iron"	Earl Bellamy	A.I. Bezzerides & Dwight Newton	February 23, 1959
Hardie's friend Curly Brown is killed, and Hardie arrives to care for the family and find the killer. Featuring Ann Rutherford.
77	25	"The House I Enter"	Earl Bellamy	William F. Leicester, Dwight Newton & Leslie Elizabeth Thomas	March 2, 1959
Hardie encounters the embittered Doc Forrester (Alan Baxter) during the search for outlaws who robbed a Wells Fargo office. Featuring Luana Patten.
78	26	"The Legacy"	Earl Bellamy	Dwight Newton	March 9, 1959
The son of an outlaw tries to claim his father's homestead, but a neighbor does all he can to ensure this land belongs to him. Featuring William Joyce, Sandra Knight and Will Wright.
79	27	"The Rawhide Kid"	Earl Bellamy	Thomas T. Flynn & Samuel A. Peeples	March 16, 1959
Hardie investigates the mysterious murders of a man and his daughter, and it leads to the revelation and uncovering of an old bandit known only as the Rawhide Kid.
80	28	"Toll Road"	Earl Bellamy	Story by : Ernest Haycox; Teleplay by : Frank Bonham	March 23, 1959
An egotistical sheriff (Frank Ferguson) is shamed by an escape criminal in front of the town, and seeks to hunt him down when he takes a toll station hostage.
81	29	"The Tired Gun"	Earl Bellamy	A.I. Bezzerides	March 30, 1959
Hardie tries to help a local woman whose troubled brother, Ira Wilkins (Nick Adams), soon runs afoul of Wells Fargo.
82	30	"Terry"	Earl Bellamy	Story by : William F. Leicester; Teleplay by : William F. Leicester & Dwight Newton	April 6, 1959
A young woman, daughter of the local Wells Fargo agent, and her affections are torn between her friend and a stranger with theft & robbery in mind.
83	31	"The Last Stand"	Earl Bellamy	Story by : John W. Cunningham; Teleplay by : Dwight Newton	April 13, 1959
An old hired hand (Eddy Waller), existing on faded memories of a heroic past, creates problems for the company & Jim Hardie, and tries to create one last memory, however dangerous, to secure some sort of legacy for himself.
84	32	"Bob Dawson"	Earl Bellamy	Steve Fisher	April 20, 1959
Bob Dawson (Edgar Buchanan) is embroiled in a daring Wells Fargo heist, committed in the sort of fashion he used in his outlaw days. Despite appearances, Jim Hardie is convinced that Dawson is innocent.
85	33	"The Tall Texan"	Sidney Salkow	Story by : D.D. Beauchamp & Mary M. Beauchamp; Teleplay by : Dwight Newton, D.D. Beauchamp & Mary M. Beauchamp	April 27, 1959
Hardie heads to Montana and encounters "the Tall Texan" Ben Kilpatrick.
86	34	"Doc Holliday"	Earl Bellamy	Story by : Robert Giles; Teleplay by : Martin Berkeley & Clarke Reynolds	May 4, 1959
Hardie encounters Doc Holliday (Martin Landau) & his wife Amy, and all 3 become entangled in a Wells Fargo heist in town.
87	35	"Kid Curry"	David Lowell Rich	Story by : D.D. Beauchamp; Teleplay by : D.D. Beauchamp & Dwight Newton	May 11, 1959
Featuring Philip Pine as outlaw Kid Curry, who encountered Jim Hardie once and swears to never be taken captive alive again.
88	36	"The Little Man"	David Lowell Rich	Story by : Steve McNeil; Teleplay by : Charles B. Smith & Steve McNeil	May 18, 1959
Two passengers come into town having survived a Wells Fargo stagecoach heist, but Jim Hardie is suspicious that these passengers may in fact be the outlaws who robbed the stagecoach in the first place. Featuring Walter Burke and Read Morgan.
89	37	"The Daltons"	Sidney Salkow	Dwight Newton	May 25, 1959
Hardie encounters the Dalton Brothers, old acquaintances of his, and must do his best to prevent them from pulling off a daring bank robbery.
90	38	"The Bounty Hunter"	Sidney Salkow	Dean Riesner	June 1, 1959
A railroad holdup leads Hardie into the path of a ruthless bounty hunter. Featuring Darryl Hickman.
91	39	"Clay Allison"	Sidney Salkow	Martin Berkeley & Clarke Reynolds	June 15, 1959
Featuring Warren Stevens as gunfighter Clay Allison. With Jeanne Cooper.

=== Season 4 (1959–60) ===
Season 4 consisted of 30-minute episodes in black-and-white airing 8:30–9 p.m. on Monday nights.

No. overall	No. in season	Title	Directed by	Written by	Original release date
92	1	"Young Jim Hardie"	Sidney Salkow	William Fay	September 7, 1959
The origins of Jim Hardie as he encounters Wells Fargo for the first time. Featuring Walter Sande, John Dehner, Rusty Lane and Vito Scotti.
93	2	"Desert Showdown"	Sidney Salkow	Samuel A. Peeples	September 14, 1959
Hardie and an Army patrol travel thru Yaqui country with a prisoner.
94	3	"The Warrior's Return"	Sidney Salkow	William Fay	September 21, 1959
Hardie is sent to find prize fighter Soldier O'Malley (Don Megowan), who is accused of stealing money from Wells Fargo and killing a marshal.
95	4	"The Jackass"	Sidney Salkow	Borden Chase	September 28, 1959
Wells Fargo is plagued by a string of robberies around the town of Leadville, as Hardie discovers upon entering town when he is held up by an old lady.
96	5	"The Stage Line"	Sidney Salkow	Frank Gruber	October 5, 1959
The Braddock stage line is for sale and Jim Hardie is sent to finalize their deal with Wells Fargo, but Hardie soon identifies issues with the sale. Featuring James Franciscus.
97	6	"The Train Robbery"	Sidney Salkow	Martin Berkeley	October 12, 1959
A gang seeks to rob a train Hardie is on of its old paper money shipment. Featuring John Doucette and Mara Corday.
98	7	"Double Reverse"	David Lowell Rich	Fred Freiberger	October 19, 1959
A released convict (Denver Pyle} attempts to leverage his estrange wife (Judith Evelyn) and son in a scheme to rob the Wells Fargo office she works at.
99	8	"Tom Horn"	Sidney Salkow	Heck Allen	October 26, 1959
Jim Hardie saves the life of noted outlaw Tom Horn, but soon realizes the trouble he created for himself as the 2 move through Apache territory.
100	9	"The Quiet Village"	David Lowell Rich	Charles Smith	November 2, 1959
A man attempts to rob Wells Fargo but disappears, taking refuge in the home of a reclusive old woman whom he manipulates into providing cover for his escape out of town.
101	10	"Home Town"	David Lowell Rich	Borden Chase	November 16, 1959
Former Wells Fargo shotgun messenger Matthew Land (Ben Cooper) is released from prison and returns home, met by the challenges of a distrusting town that doesn't want him, a girlfriend who very much does, former compatriots who want the loot he stole from the company, and Jim Hardie who suspects things will soon work out best for the company & Matthew.
102	11	"End of a Legend"	David Lowell Rich	Samuel A. Peeples	November 23, 1959
A robbery ends up with a local derelict in jail claiming to be the late outlaw Johnny Caine. But Jim Hardie, knowing the true fate of Johnny Caine, must find a way to use that fate to help solve the crime.
103	12	"The Return of Doc Bell"	David Lowell Rich	Story by : William F. Leicester; Teleplay by : Charles B. Smith	November 30, 1959
Once more Jim Hardie encounters Doc Bell (Edward Platt), now released from prison and working as a small town doctor whose criminal past is known to some and could be exploited. With Jack Ging.
104	13	"Woman with a Gun"	David Lowell Rich	Dean Riesner	December 7, 1959
105	14	"Long Odds"	Sidney Salkow	David Lang	December 14, 1959
Hardie tries to help a friend who is confronted with a dangerous man from her past tempting her with promises of a better future.
106	15	"Wanted: Jim Hardie"	Sidney Salkow	Martin Berkeley	December 21, 1959
Outlaw Wade Donnellan offers a $1,000 cash bounty for the person who kills Hardie.
107	16	"Relay Station"	Sidney Salkow	Frank Gruber	December 28, 1959
Hardie finds a wounded man along the trail to a Wells Fargo relay station whose operator had just died. Featuring Lori Nelson and James Westerfield.
108	17	"Cole Younger"	Sidney Salkow	Clay Fisher	January 4, 1960
While on vacation Jim Hardie encounters Cole Younger (Royal Dano), who takes Hardie and a young injured girl (Patty Ann Gerrity) hostage to ensure his safety.
109	18	"The Easterner"	Sidney Salkow	N.B. Stone Jr.	January 11, 1960
Hardie makes the acquaintance of a East Coast gentleman on a stagecoach ride, whose interest in the large sum of Wells Fargo money Hardie carries slowly reveals who he really is.
110	19	"The Governor's Visit"	Sidney Salkow	Borden Chase	January 18, 1960
The governor of Wyoming campaigning across the state finds himself ambushed in a small town's dance hall, and Hardie must help him & the girls survive. Featuring Mari Blanchard and Wendell Holmes.
111	20	"The Journey"	Sidney Salkow	Fred Freiberger	January 25, 1960
Jim Hardie escorts a jeweler (Robert Cornthwaite) via stagecoach carrying $30k in gems, as the threat of robbery lurks around their entire trip.
112	21	"The Canyon"	Sidney Salkow	Edmund Morris	February 1, 1960
Hardie travels to a canyon that hosts refuge for outlaws & bandits to find an old timer whose testimony can save an innocent man from the gallows.
113	22	"Red Ransom"	Sidney Salkow	Dean Riesner	February 8, 1960
Apache renegade Joe Black (Frank de Kova) is captured by Jim Hardie & authorities, but his kin soon respond by kidnapping a young woman and forcing Hardie to deal with both the Apache & the townspeople who wish to capitulate to the ransom demands.
114	23	"The English Woman"	Sidney Salkow	Fred Freiberger	February 15, 1960
A woman is killed by a sniper as she exits a Wells Fargo stagecoach, and Hardie must determine the killer's identity and protect the woman's daughter from further harm. Featuring Frank Ferguson.
115	24	"Forty-Four Forty"	Sidney Salkow	Borden Chase	February 29, 1960
A series of notched bullets are the only way Hardie can identify a group of men, hiding in plain sight, who've robbed from Wells Fargo and killed with deadly aim.
116	25	"The Late Mayor Brown"	Sidney Salkow	William Fay	March 7, 1960
A Wells Fargo agent wins the local mayoral election and is immediately shot dead by an unknown assailant. Hardie arrives to investigate his colleague's killing, where the trail leads to several possible conclusions. Featuring Gail Kobe and John Stephenson.
117	26	"Black Trail"	Sidney Salkow	Story by : Robert Giles; Teleplay by : Charles B. Smith	March 21, 1960
A bank manager is suspected of coordinating the theft of $100k, and Hardie is on the hunt by following a woman (Dianne Foster) suspected of being his mistress.
118	27	"The Great Bullion Robbery"	Sidney Salkow	Story by : Ralph Conger; Teleplay by : David Lang	March 21, 1960
Hardie investigates the theft of gold from a Wells Fargo office but finds there is no short list of suspects.
119	28	"The Outlaw's Wife"	Sidney Salkow	Martin Berkeley	March 28, 1960
A jailed outlaw (John Archer), reluctant to give up the location of his stolen Wells Fargo loot, suddenly implores Hardie's aid when his wife is threatened.
120	29	"The Town"	Sidney Salkow	Frank Gruber	April 4, 1960
A young woman (Mary Webster) finds herself owning the entire town of Wolf Creek, but trouble looms as prospective buyers hound her at every turn.
121	30	"The Trading Post"	Sidney Salkow	Frank Gruber	April 11, 1960
122	31	"Dead Man's Street"	Sidney Salkow	William Fay	April 18, 1960
While passing through Paradise, California, Jim Hardie encounters an old U.S. Marshal (Wallace Ford) and his struggle with the Ferguson brothers, who control the town thru fear & intimidation. What starts as a simple street involving one of the brothers (George Kennedy) turns into tensions finally boiling over. Featuring Buddy Ebsen, Walter Sande and Barney Phillips.
123	32	"Threat of Death"	Sidney Salkow	David Lang	April 25, 1960
A sheriff and his deputies are killed fighting the Johnny Crail gang, and as Hardie later enters town with a captive Crail he must assume some form of control while dealing with a variety of townspeople and the approaching gang who will make that job very difficult. Featuring Robert Middleton and William Campbell.
124	33	"Dealer's Choice"	Sidney Salkow	Story by : George Waggner; Teleplay by : Bill S. Ballinger & George Waggner	May 2, 1960
125	34	"Pearl Hart"	Sidney Salkow	Frank Gruber	May 9, 1960
Jim Hardie is held up on a Wells Fargo stagecoach by outlaw Pearl Hart (Beverly Garland), and he must track her down.
126	35	"Vasquez"	Sidney Salkow	Story by : Frank Gruber; Teleplay by : Steve Fisher	May 16, 1960
Featuring Cesare Danova as Tiburcio Vásquez. With BarBara Luna.
127	36	"Kid Brother"	Sidney Salkow	Story by : Bill S. Ballinger; Teleplay by : William Fay	May 23, 1960
Hardie's younger brother Ben (Larry Pennell) has become bored with married life & wants to follow Jim's path as a Wells Fargo agent. A trip to nearby New Orleans on business gives Jim the chance to force Ben to reassess that opinion. With Lucy Marlow, Howard Caine and Henry Corden).
128	37	"Man for the Job"	Sidney Salkow	J.K. Tucker	May 30, 1960
Jim Hardie is forced to rehire an old employee (Harold J. Stone), disgraced by accusations of stealing from Wells Fargo, as shotgun messenger on an upcoming stage run.

=== Season 5 (1960–61) ===
All episodes in black-and-white

No. overall	No. in season	Title	Directed by	Written by	Original release date
129	1	"Day of Judgement"	Louis King	Barney Slater	September 5, 1960
Jim Hardie encounters a stranger named Wade Cather (John Dehner), who like Hardie is in search of a man named Eli Fisher.
130	2	"Angry Town"	Louis King	Peter Germano	September 5, 1960
Hardie is in search of the Utah Kid and a stolen Wells Fargo deposit, but soon discovers the Kid was strung up the previous day for killing a local man and did not have any of the money on him. Suspects, Hardie quickly learns, are plentiful in town. Featuring Sydney Pollack, Paul Fix and Paul Burch.
131	3	"Doc Dawson"	Gene Fowler Jr.	Story by : Steve Fisher; Teleplay by : Frank Price and Steve Fisher	September 19, 1960
Jim Hardie winds up in southern Utah in search of a missing Wells Fargo agent and crosses paths once more with Bob Dawson Edgar Buchanan, now a dentist in town and yet again embroiled in some troublesome drama.
132	4	"Kinfolk"	Gene Fowler Jr.	Story by : Louis L'Amour; Teleplay by : Paul Gangelin	September 26, 1960
Len Lassiter (Richard Jaeckel) is accused of killings and robberies in Texas, and Jim Hardie tracks him down to his hometown, which is greatly populated by the Lassiter family. Proving Len's guilt may cost Hardie everything.
133	5	"A Study in Petticoats"	Gene Fowler Jr.	Mark Hanna	October 17, 1960
Featuring Whitney Blake and Diane Jergens.
134	6	"All That Glitters"	Gene Fowler Jr.	Steven Thornley	October 24, 1960
135	7	"Run for the River"	Gene Fowler Jr.	Peter Germano	November 7, 1960
Jim Hardie escorts Ira Kyle through the town of Red Bluff, where Ira is well known and well hated for a killing in the past. Hardie must protect his prisoner while also investigate the claim that Ira Kyle is not guilty of this particular crime.
136	8	"Leading Citizen"	Gene Fowler Jr.	Barney Slater	November 14, 1960
Jim Hardie finds an abandoned company stagecoach in a town run & populated by outlaws and other ne'er do wells Hardie has encountered in the past. Featuring Robert Middleton.
137	9	"The Killing of Johnny Lash"	Lawrence Doheny	Mark Rodgers	November 21, 1960
Featuring Anne Helm as Nellie Bly.
138	10	"The Wade Place"	Lawrence Doheny	Story by : Louis L'Amour; Teleplay by : Charles A. Wallace	November 28, 1960
Featuring Robert J. Wilke
139	11	"Jeff Davis' Treasure"	Frank McDonald	Barney Slater	December 5, 1960
Jim Hardie is searching for stolen gold, which some folks (including Hardie's acquaintance Wade Cather) believe is the lost Confederate treasure of Jefferson Davis. Featuring John Dehner and Leo Gordon.
140	12	"The Bride and the Bandit"	Frank McDonald	Story by : Louis L'Amour; Teleplay by : Paul Gangelin	December 12, 1960
As Wells Fargo agent Ben meets Ellen, with whom he'd been exchanging letters, Hardy questions her knowledge of a local gambler. Featuring Dabbs Greer and Virginia Christine.
141	13	"Escort to Santa Fe"	Frank McDonald	Steven Thornley	December 19, 1960
Featuring Stephen Chase.
142	14	"Frightened Witness"	Frank McDonald	Story by : Dwight Newton; Teleplay by : Barney Slater	December 26, 1960
The trial of Walt Corbin is threatened by someone killing potential witnesses. Featuring John Milford and Penny Edwards.
143	15	"The Border Renegade"	Frank McDonald	Barney Slater	January 2, 1961
Featuring Elaine Devry, John Beradino and Argentina Brunetti.
144	16	"Captain Scoville"	Frank McDonald	Story by : Louis L'Amour; Teleplay by : Paul Gangelin	January 9, 1961
An Army officer DeForest Kelley accused of desertion is hounded by 2 Army soldiers and Jim Hardie, who determines the soldiers are not what they seem.
145	17	"The Has-Been"	James P. Yarbrough	Story by : Louis L'Amour; Teleplay by : Charles A. Wallace	January 16, 1961
A standard stagecoach trip winds up in danger of stickup and winds up in an abandoned town. Featuring J. Pat O'Malley, Andra Martin, Adam West and Hal Needham.
146	18	"Town Against a Man"	James P. Yarbrough	Peter Germano	January 23, 1961
Hardie drops by the home of his friend Tony Crandall, and is shocked to learn he died only days earlier. What more, a wedding Hardie assumed was imminent is unknown to anyone in town, which sets Hardie off to investigate just why his friend died.
147	19	"The Barefoot Bandit"	Lewis R. Foster	Lewis R. Foster	January 30, 1961
A barefoot fighter (Tom Hennesy) passing thru town with his manager is accused of robbing a Wells Fargo office, and it's that bare foot that could help Jim Hardie determine the real culprit.
148	20	"The Hand That Shook the Hand"	William Witney	Cyril Hume	February 6, 1961
Boxer John L. Sullivan (Claude Akins) drunkenly shows up via stagecoach and trouble ensues, involving everyone in town. With Vito Scotti.
149	21	"That Washburn Girl"	William Witney	Charles A. Wallace	February 13, 1961
Wells Fargo agent Nora Washburn (Mari Aldon) and her brother Tom Jack Nicholson's explosive relationship erupts just as someone in town blows up the Wells Fargo office and steals a large sum of money. With John Archer and Morris Ankrum.
150	22	"The Diamond Dude"	Lewis R. Foster	Barney Slater	February 27, 1961
Featuring James Millhollin and Robert Middleton.
151	23	"A Show for Silver Lode"	Richard Bartlett	Story by : Leo Gordon & Paul Leslie Peil; Teleplay by : Charles A. Wallace	March 6, 1961
Featuring Patrice Wymore.
152	24	"Fraud"	Richard Bartlett	Story by : Mark Rodgers; Teleplay by : Paul Gangelin	March 13, 1961
Jim Hardie arrives in Still River only to discover the local agent dead in his office and the claim he was sent to investigate may be linked to it. Featuring Sue Ane Langdon and Steve Brodie.
153	25	"Stage from Yuma"	Lewis R. Foster	Barney Slater	March 20, 1961
Featuring Joan Evans.
154	26	"Prince Jim"	Richard Bartlett	Eric Freiwald & Robert Schaefer	March 27, 1961
Jim Hardie happens upon a stagecoach wreck with two survivors, both robbed of money... and the girl's doll, which is Hardie's only clue in finding the culprits. Featuring Gina Gillespie and Norman Leavitt.
155	27	"The Remittance Man"	William Witney	Paul Gangelin	April 3, 1961
An English gentleman finds himself in a strange predicament as the money he won in a card game was in fact cash stolen from a Wells Fargo office, but he is inclined to pay off his debts rather than give the money back. With Yvonne Craig.
156	28	"The Jealous Man"	William Witney	Peter Germano	April 10, 1961
Friends of Jim Hardie - a man sent to prison (Ed Nelson) and his estranged wife (Faith Domergue) - return to his life in the most unexpected, and dangerous, of ways.
157	29	"Something Pretty"	James P. Yarbrough	Paul Gangelin & Carl M. Onspaugh	April 17, 1961
A man (Peter Whitney) and his dog discover a valuable bracelet on his property, and the crooks who stole it in the first place (Leonard Nimoy, James Seay) are on the hunt to retrieve it.
158	30	"Lady Trouble"	James P. Yarbrough	Eric Freiwald & Robert Schaefer	April 24, 1961
Mine owner Agatha Webster (Josephine Hutchinson) requires strict adherence of her personal rules & regulations from Jim Hardie & Wells Fargo, but a confidence man (Robert Armstrong) aims to take advantage of her and rob her blind.
159	31	"Moment of Glory"	Lewis R. Foster	Lewis R. Foster	May 1, 1961
Featuring Eddy Waller.
160	32	"The Lobo"	William Witney	Charles A. Wallace	May 8, 1961
Sam Horne (Jim Davis) winds up in trouble in town with both Jim Hardie and a bounty hunter on his trail.
161	33	"Rifles for Red Hand"	William Witney	Ken Pettus	May 15, 1961
Hardie is sent by the U.S. Cavalry to investigate a casino/ranch owner (Ziva Rodann) and her possible connection to the armament of local Cheyenne tribes. Featuring Stanley Adams and Harp McGuire.
162	34	"Gunman's Revenge"	Lewis R. Foster	Lewis R. Foster	May 22, 1961
Released outlaw Rocky Nelson is out for revenge against those who helped incarcerate him, one of whom is Jim Hardie. With Harry Carey Jr..
163	35	"The Repentant Outlaw"	James H. Brown	Cyril Hume	May 29, 1961
Bob Dawson Edgar Buchanan is up to his usual troubles in a new town, and while acting as a medic and dentist he's kidnapped by an injured outlaw whose news of an impending Army payroll heist inspires Dawson to become involved and save the day.
164	36	"A Quiet Little Town"	James H. Brown	Steven Thornley	June 5, 1961
Sheriff Dave Prescott is killed, and his friend Hardie learns the new sheriff, his old colleague Wade Cather (John Dehner), wants to find the murderer his way.
165	37	"Bitter Vengeance"	R.G. Springsteen	Charles A. Wallace	June 12, 1961
Featuring Nina Shipman and Phyllis Coates.
166	38	"John Jones"	R.G. Springsteen	Paul Gangelin	June 26, 1961
A gypsy girl, Zita (Donna Martell), is the only witness Jim Hardie has in finding a kidnapped stagecoach passenger. With Warren Oates.
167	39	"The Dowry"	Lewis R. Foster	James Brooks, Lewis R. Foster & Frank Gruber	July 10, 1961
Jim Hardie escorts a soon to be bride (Lisa Gaye) and her father's (Alan Napier) considerable dowry to Baton Rogue. But someone quite close to them aims to take that dowry for themselves.

=== Season 6 (1961–62) ===
All episodes now hour-long, and in color

No. overall	No. in season	Title	Directed by	Written by	Original release date
168	1	"Casket 7.3"	Jerry Hopper	Milton S. Gelman	September 30, 1961
Featuring Howard Keel. Jim Hardie is drawn into investigating a Confederate plot to print worthless bonds that would send the U.S. Treasury into disaster. The series shifts focus somewhat around life on and around Jim Hardie's new ranch near the town of Gloribee, with a more central cast of regular characters: William Demarest joins the series with this episode as Jeb Gaine, Hardie's foreman, and Virginia Christine as Ovie, the former owner of the ranch and Hardie's neighbor. Also introduced in supporting roles are Mary Jane Saunders and Lory Patrick as Ovie's daughters Mary Gee and Tina. One of the main characters in this episode, Jack Ging as Beau McCloud, also joins the series for a 13-episode arc.
169	2	"The Dodger"	R.G. Springsteen	Jack Turley	October 7, 1961
A man recently released from prison (Philip Carey) seeks revenge on Jim Hardie. With Claude Akins.
170	3	"Treasure Coach"	R.G. Springsteen	Milton Geiger & Milton S. Gelman	October 14, 1961
Featuring Robert Vaughn, Patricia Crowley, Jocelyn Brando and J. Pat O'Malley.
171	4	"Death Raffle"	William F. Claxton	Milton S. Gelman & Jack Turley	October 21, 1961
Featuring Gary Clarke.
172	5	"Tanoa"	R.G. Springsteen	Story by : Kay Lenard & Jess Carneol; Teleplay by : Kay Lenard, Jess Carneol & Lewis R. Foster	October 28, 1961
Featuring Rodolfo Acosta and Iron Eyes Cody.
173	6	"Mr. Mute"	William F. Claxton	Story by : Charles A. Wallace; Teleplay by : Robert C. Dennis & Milton S. Gelman	November 4, 1961
A train traveling thru Gloribee is robbed, and the loot stashed in the trunk of a clown named Mr. Mute (Vito Scotti). When Mr. Mute disembarks the robbers must scramble to retrieve the plundered money bags from him. Featuring Lyle Bettger.
174	7	"Jeremiah"	R.G. Springsteen	Story by : Barney Slater; Teleplay by : Barney Slater and Milton S. Gelman	November 11, 1961
A former friend of Hardie's (Albert Salmi) tries to rob a Wells Fargo office, and Hardie tracks him down to the ranch of a widow and her children. Featuring Margarita Cordova, Joseph Ruskin and Nancy Gates.
175	8	"A Fistful of Pride"	R.G. Springsteen	Sam Ross	November 18, 1961
The estranged wife of washed-up boxer Bonzo Croydon (Eddie Albert) arrives in Gloribee to obtain custody of the couple's only child (Gina Gillespie). Croydon challenges the Frisco Kid to a fight, in the hopes some quick cash can improve his chances of keeping his daughter, and perhaps saving his marriage. Featuring Ed Nelson, and Barbara Stuart.
176	9	"Defiant at the Gate"	R.G. Springsteen	Anthony Lawrence	November 25, 1961
Featuring Gloria Talbott, Tom Tully, Frank Ferguson and L.Q. Jones.
177	10	"Man of Another Breed"	William F. Claxton	Richard Newman	December 2, 1961
Featuring Debra Paget and Robert Middleton.
178	11	"Kelly's Clover Girls"	R.G. Springsteen	Jack Turley	December 9, 1961
Three dance hall girls (Virginia Field, Lisa Gaye, Dawn Wells) are being transported to Nevada to serve as witnesses in the murder investigation of a Wells Fargo agent. Featuring Michael Pate and Glenn Strange.
179	12	"A Killing in Calico"	William F. Claxton	Story by : Lynn Mitchell; Teleplay by : Jack Turley	December 16, 1961
Hardie and Beau escort outlaw Jamie Coburn (Dean Jones) home to visit his mother, not realizing she has passed, and encounters his estranged wife and the looming threat of death from Coburn's former gang. (Dean Jones was married to series co-star Lory Patrick, who does not appear in this episode, from 1972 until his death in 2015.)
180	13	"New Orleans Trackdown"	R.G. Springsteen	Peter Germano	December 23, 1961
Hardie is on the hunt for a stolen diamond necklace stolen off of a Wells Fargo stagecoach in a daring heist. Featuring Tina Louise and Marjorie Bennett. Jack Ging's final episode, as Beau McCloud is promoted & transferred to the Kansas City Wells Fargo office.
181	14	"Trackback"	R.G. Springsteen	Ed Adamson	December 30, 1961
Featuring Richard Rust and Leo Gordon.
182	15	"Moneyrun"	Francis D. Lyon	Sam Ross	January 6, 1962
Featuring Michael Ansara. A former governor of a Mexican province flees to San Francisco, with a gang of former Mexican soldiers in pursuit plotting to steal his money with the unwitting aid of Jim Hardie & Wells Fargo.
183	16	"Return to Yesterday"	Harry Harris	Ken Trevey	January 13, 1962
Ella Congreve ((Dianne Foster), once a lover of Jim Hardie's, reenters his life on a pursuit of some kind of life beyond the successful singing career her father wanted for her. Featuring Addison Richards and Lew Gallo.
184	17	"Reward for Gaine"	Francis D. Lyon	Milton S. Gelman	January 20, 1962
Jim Hardie aids the Army in tracking down a deserter and his troops, dealing with an obstinate, Indian-murdering colonel and a complicated personal connection this case has for Jeb. Featuring John Doucette and John Anderson.
185	18	"Assignment in Gloribee"	R.G. Springsteen	Anthony Lawrence	January 27, 1962
A reporter from New England travels to Gloribee to chronicle life in the west for her readers, and encounters more than her fair share of frontier troubles. Featuring Rod Cameron, Patricia Owens, George Kennedy and Stafford Repp.
186	19	"Incident at Crossbow"	Stuart Heisler	William R. Cox	February 3, 1962
An ex-convict (Sean McClory) takes a Wells Fargo station hostage awaiting the arrival of the judge who imprisoned him years ago. Featuring Russell Thorson, Michael Forest, Hal Baylor and Joyce Meadows.
187	20	"Portrait of Teresa"	R.G. Springsteen	Al C. Ward	February 10, 1962
Featuring Simon Oakland.
188	21	"Hometown Doctor"	Sidney Lanfield	Milton S. Gelman, Jerry Adelman & Peter Germano	February 17, 1962
After a beloved doctor is killed under mysterious circumstances, his son arrives in town to handle the estate as Hardie deals with a delayed (and quite irritated) cattle herder and investigating the doctor's death.
189	22	"The Traveler"	R.G. Springsteen	Al C. Ward	February 24, 1962
Featuring Jack Warden.
190	23	"Winter Storm"	William Witney	Dick Nelson	March 3, 1962
Featuring Dan Duryea and R.G. Armstrong. A Wells Fargo stagecoach is stranded in a winter storm in an abandoned town, where 2 paranoid outlaws are hiding out from a former colleague who they fear has finally tracked them down.
191	24	"Chauncey"	R.G. Springsteen	Ellis Marcus	March 17, 1962
Featuring Burt Brinckerhoff. A troubled young man comes to Gloribee and attracts the attention of Tina, but his violent nature puts her life in danger. Mary Jane Saunders' final appearance as Mary Gee; her character is referred to as being out of town in the last few episodes.
192	25	"Who Lives by the Gun"	William Witney	Albert Aley	March 24, 1962
While trailing the people who held up a Wells Fargo payroll shipment, Hardie shoots and critically wounds the son (Bart Patton) of a widow (Judith Evelyn) who owns the local mine, and the entire town is ready to lynch Hardie after the lead robber says the son wasn't involved in the holdup before being mysteriously sprung from jail and killed himself. Also featuring John Archer, Kathie Browne, Paul Birch and John Alderson.
193	26	"To Kill a Town"	R.G. Springsteen	Al C. Ward	March 31, 1962
Hardie and his prisoner, an outlaw named Lou Reese (Buddy Ebsen), are trapped by other outlaws hunting Reese in the town of New Madrid, where Reese is a local hero and Hardie has to hide his own identity while trying to stop the outlaws from poisoning the town's water. Also featuring Russell Johnson, Harry Lauter, Olan Soule, and Joan Staley.
194	27	"End of a Minor God"	Christian Nyby	David P. Harmon	April 7, 1962
Legendary fast-draw gunfighter Billy Trent (Lin McCarthy) boards a Wells Fargo stage in Gloribee, and Hardie also boards to protect the passengers against a gunfighter trailing Trent (with a gang) to make a bigger name for himself. Featuring Eileen Ryan, Jan Merlin, Walter Coy and William Schallert.
195	28	"Remember the Yazoo"	R.G. Springsteen	Ellis Marcus	April 14, 1962
Featuring Robert Cornthwaite, Alan Napier, Jeanne Bal and James Westerfield.
196	29	"The Angry Sky"	Christian Nyby	Al C. Ward	April 21, 1962
Featuring Arch Johnson and Fay Spain
197	30	"Royal Maroon"	R.G. Springsteen	Al C. Ward & Harry Freem	April 28, 1962
Featuring Kathleen Crowley.
198	31	"The Gold Witch"	William Witney	Story by : Dick Nelson & Irving J. McCarthy; Teleplay by : Dick Nelson	May 5, 1962
A "mind reader" and his wife, in town as part of Wells Fargo's anniversary celebration, scheme to use their act to swindle a local mine owner (Alan Hale Jr.) of his fortune. Featuring Ron Randell, Diana Millay and Whit Bissell. Virginia Christine and Lory Patrick's final appearances as Ovie & Tina.
199	32	"Don't Wake a Tiger"	R.G. Springsteen	David P. Harmon	May 12, 1962
A former Army soldier (Jim Davis) and his brother take a former war camp commander (Royal Dano) hostage as revenge, as Hardie must secure his release as well as deal with a town frustrated by the war's past creeping back into all their lives. Featuring Marjorie Reynolds.
200	33	"The Wayfarers"	William Witney	Frank Price	May 19, 1962
Hardie and a stagecoach of passengers are trapped in a cabin with outlaws, and encircled by bandits. Featuring James Coburn, Hugh Marlowe and Roxane Berard.
201	34	"Vignette of a Sinner"	William Witney	Al C. Ward	June 2, 1962
Featuring Jeff Morrow, Joyce Taylor, William Mims, and Edward Platt as Doc Bell (the only character from a previous season other than Hardie to appear in season 6). The final episode of the series. Jim Hardie falls in love with a woman engaged to be married, who then finds that her intended, a banker, has orchestrated the theft of $100k from his own bank to start life anew in South America.
