= D. B. Newton =

American writer

- Born: Dwight Bennett Newton; January 14, 1916; Kansas City, Missouri, U.S.
- Died: June 30, 2013 (aged 97); Bend, Oregon, U.S.
- Resting place: Tumalo Cemetery, Deschutes County, Oregon, U.S.
- Education: University of Missouri–Kansas City
- Occupations: Novelist, screenwriter
- Spouse: Mary Jane Kregel (m. 1941)
- Children: 2
- Writing career
- Years active: 1946–1986
- Genre: Western fiction

Dwight Bennett Newton (January 14, 1916 – June 30, 2013) was an American writer of westerns. He also wrote under the names Dwight Bennett, Clement Hardin, Ford Logan, Hank Mitchum and Dan Temple. Newton was one of the six founder members of the Western Writers of America. He was a writer and story consultant for various television shows including Wagon Train and Tales of Wells Fargo.

== Biography ==
Newton was born in Kansas City, Missouri, and began to write short stories for Western magazines while studying history at the University of Missouri at Kansas City. After graduating with a master's degree in 1942, he served in the Army Corps of Engineers until 1946, being based at Camp Abbot, a training center near Bend, Oregon, in 1943. After the war he settled in Bend, and became a professional writer, publishing 74 novels under various names, including one, Range Boss (Pocket Books, 1949), that was the first work of fiction issued in paperback, without having first appeared in hardcovers.

In 1952 Newton was one of the six founder members of Western Writers of America, Inc., serving as its first secretary-treasurer, and as a board member for ten years.

In the late 1950s, Newton moved to Hollywood to work as a writer and story consultant for several television shows, before returning to Bend in 1965.

During the 1970s, he gave classes in fiction writing at Central Oregon Community College, and at the Haystack summer school at Cannon Beach.

== Personal life ==
Newton married Mary Jane Kregel of Nebraska City, Nebraska, on January 29, 1941. They had two daughters.

He died at his home in Bend, aged 97, and is buried at Tumalo Cemetery, Deschutes County, Oregon.

== Bibliography ==
=== Novels ===
credit	title	publisher	year
D. B. Newton	Guns of the Rimrock	Phoenix Press	1946
D. B. Newton	Range of No Return	Complete Western Book magazine	1949 June
D. B. Newton	The Outlaw Breed	Gold Medal Books	1955
D. B. Newton	Maverick Brand	Monarch Books	1962
D. B. Newton	On the Dodge	Berkley	1962
D. B. Newton	Guns of Warbonnet	Berkley	1963
D. B. Newton	Bullets on the Wind	Berkley	1964
D. B. Newton	Fury at Three Forks	Berkley	1964
D. B. Newton	The Savage Hills	Berkley	1964
D. B. Newton	The Manhunters	Berkley	1966
D. B. Newton	Hideout Valley	Berkley	1967
D. B. Newton	The Tabbart Brand	Berkley	1967
D. B. Newton	Shotgun Freighter	Berkley	1968
D. B. Newton	The Wolf Pack	Berkley	1968
D. B. Newton	The Judas Horse	Berkley	1969
D. B. Newton	Syndicate Gun	Berkley	1972
D. B. Newton	Massacre Valley	Curtis Books	1973
D. B. Newton	Range Tramp	Berkley	1973
D. B. Newton	Bounty on Bannister	Berkley	1975
D. B. Newton	The Landgrabbers	Popular Library	1975
D. B. Newton	Trail of the Bear	Popular Library	1975
D. B. Newton	Broken Spur	Berkley	1977
Dwight Bennett	Stormy Range	Doubleday & Co.	1951
Dwight Bennett	Border Graze	Doubleday & Co.	1953
Dwight Bennett	The Avenger	Permabooks	1956
Dwight Bennett	Cherokee Outlet	Doubleday & Co.	1961
Dwight Bennett	Rebel Trail	Doubleday & Co.	1963
Dwight Bennett	Crooked River Canyon	Doubleday & Co.	1966
Dwight Bennett	Legend in the Dust	Doubleday & Co.	1970
Dwight Bennett	The Big Land	Doubleday & Co.	1972
Dwight Bennett	The Guns of Ellsworth	Doubleday & Co.	1973
Dwight Bennett	Hangman's Knot	Doubleday & Co.	1975
Dwight Bennett	The Cheyenne Encounter	Doubleday & Co.	1976
Dwight Bennett	West of Railhead	Doubleday and Co.	1977
Dwight Bennett	The Texans	Doubleday & Co.	1979
Dwight Bennett	Disaster Creek	Doubleday & Co.	1981
Ford Logan	Fire in the Desert	Ballantine Books	1954
Dan Temple	Bullet Lease	Popular Library	1957
Dan Temple	Gun and Star	Monarch Books	1964
Clement Hardin	Hellbent For a Hangrope	Ace Books	1954
Clement Hardin	Cross Me in Gunsmoke	Ace Books	1957
Clement Hardin	Longhorn Law	Ace Books	1957
Clement Hardin	The Lurking Gun	Ace Books	1961
Clement Hardin	Outcast of Ute Bend	Ace Books	1965
Clement Hardin	The Ruthless Breed	Ace Books	1966
Clement Hardin	The Oxbow Deed	Ace Books	1967
Clement Hardin	The Paxman Feud	Ace Books	1967
Clement Hardin	Ambush Reckoning	Ace Books	1968
Clement Hardin	Sheriff of Sentinel	Ace Books	1969
Clement Hardin	Colt Wages	Ace Books	1970
Clement Hardin	Stage Line to Rincon	Ace Books	1971
Clement Hardin	The Badge Shooters	Ace Books	1975
Hank Mitchum	Dodge City: Stagecoach Station #1	Bantam Books	1982
Hank Mitchum	Laredo: Stagecoach Station #2	Bantam Books	1982
Hank Mitchum	Tombstone: Stagecoach Station #4	Bantam Books	1983
Hank Mitchum	Santa Fe: Stagecoach Station #6	Bantam Books	1983
Hank Mitchum	Deadwood: Stagecoach Station #11	Bantam Books	1984
Hank Mitchum	Carson City: Stagecoach Station #13	Bantam Books	1984
Hank Mitchum	Leadville: Stagecoach Station #20	Bantam Books	1985
Hank Mitchum	Tulsa: Stagecoach Station #26	Bantam Books	1986

=== Short stories ===
As "D. B. Newton"

- "Swing High, Nester!", Lariat Story (March 1949)
- "White Thunder of the Cherokees", Frontier Stories, (Summer 1949)
- "Three Guns and a Girl", Best Western (September 1951)
- "Rogue's Rendezvous", Rio Kid Western (January 1952)
- "Stage Coach West", Frontier Stories (Spring 1952)
- "The Slack Rein", Western Short Stories (June 1952)
- "The Kid Who Wouldn't Talk", Best Western, (July 1952)
- "The Kid That Satan Sent", Western Novels and Short Stories (April 1953)
- "Mule Tracks", Bad Men and Good (WWA anthology), Dodd, Mead, (1953)
- "Chain of Command", With Guidons Flying (WWA anthology), edited by Charles N. Heckelmann. Doubleday & Co., (1970)
- "The Storm Riders", Zane Grey Western (October 1970)

As "Dwight Bennett"

- "Trail's End at the Hangtree", Five Western Novels (October 1951)

As "Jackson Cole"

- "The Barbed Barrier", Texas Rangers (July 1953)

=== Teleplays ===
- Cimarron City
  - "Kid on a Calico Horse". Teleplay by Dwight Newton and Thomas Thompson. Story by E. Jack Neuman (April 28, 1958)
- Colt .45
  - "Under False Pretenses". Teleplay by Dwight Newton. Story by Elmer Kelton (October 3, 1959)
- Overland Trail
  - "Daughter of the Sioux". Teleplay by Dwight Newton (January 6, 1960)
- Shotgun Slade
  - "Mesa of Missing Men". Teleplay by Dwight Newton (June 19, 1959)
  - "Barbed Wire". Teleplay by Frank Bonham and Dwight Newton (July 17, 1959)
  - "Major Trouble". Teleplay by Bob Mitchell and Dwight Newton. Story by Ralph Conger (July 30, 1959)
  - "Bob Ford". Teleplay by Tod Ballard and Dwight Newton (August 24, 1959)
- Tales of Wells Fargo
  - "The Hasty Gun". Teleplay by Dwight Newton (January 28, 1957)
  - "Shotgun Messenger". Teleplay by Dwight Newton and Sloan Nibley (February 26, 1957)
  - "Jesse James". Teleplay by Dwight Newton (March 5, 1957)
  - "Ride With a Killer". Teleplay by Verne Athanas and Dwight Newton (March 19, 1957)
  - "Fort Massacre". Teleplay by Dwight Newton and David Chandler. Story by David Chandler (April 8, 1957)
  - "Luke Frazer". Teleplay by Dwight Newton. Story by T. T. Flynn (July 9, 1958)
  - "The Branding Iron". Teleplay by A. I. Bezzerides and Dwight Newton (August 6, 1958)
  - "Wild Cargo". Teleplay by Dwight Newton. Story by Steve Fisher (August 14, 1958)
  - "The House I Enter". Teleplay by Dwight Newton. Story by William F. Leicester (October 31, 1958)
  - "The Last Stand". Teleplay by Dwight Newton. Story by John Cunningham (November 21, 1958)
  - "Tall Texan". Teleplay by D. D. Beauchamp, Mary Beauchamp and Dwight Newton (January 13, 1959)
  - "Kid Curry". Teleplay by D. D. Beauchamp and Dwight Newton. Story by D. D. Beauchamp (March 6, 1959)
  - "The Daltons". Teleplay by Dwight Newton (April 9, 1959)
  - "The Dynamite Kid". Teleplay by Dwight Newton (September 1, 1959)
  - "Frightened Witness". Teleplay by Dwight Newton and Barney Slater. Story by Dwight Newton (October 27, 1960)
- Wagon Train
  - "The Jesse Cowan Story". Story and teleplay by Dwight Newton (October 28, 1957)
  - "The Bill Tawnee Story". Teleplay by Rik Vollaerts and Dwight Newton. Story by Rik Vollaerts (February 12, 1958)
- Whiplash
  - "Convict Town". By Dwight Newton (September 17, 1960)

== Legacy ==
Nineteen linear feet of the author's papers are held at the University of Oregon Libraries, Special Collections and University Archives.
