= Stage to Tucson =

1950 film by Ralph Murphy

- Theatrical release poster
- Directed by: Ralph Murphy
- Screenplay by: Robert Creighton Williams; Frank Burt; Robert Libott
- Based on: Lost Stage Valley by Frank Bonham
- Produced by: Harry Joe Brown
- Starring: Rod Cameron; Wayne Morris; Kay Buckley; Sally Eilers; Carl Benton Reid; Roy Roberts
- Cinematography: Charles Lawton Jr.
- Edited by: Charles Nelson
- Music by: Paul Sawtell
- Production company: Columbia Pictures
- Distributed by: Columbia Pictures
- Release date: December 1950
- Running time: 81 minutes
- Country: United States
- Language: English

Stage to Tucson is a 1950 American Western film directed by Ralph Murphy and written by Robert Creighton Williams, Frank Burt and Robert Libott. It is based on the 1948 novel Lost Stage Valley by Frank Bonham. The film stars Rod Cameron, Wayne Morris, Kay Buckley, Sally Eilers, Carl Benton Reid and Roy Roberts. The film was released in December 1950, by Columbia Pictures and remade by them in 1956 as The Phantom Stagecoach, reusing extensive footage from the earlier film and changing it from Technicolor to black and white.

== Plot ==
John Butterfield, owner of Butterfield Overland Mail, visits newly elected President Abraham Lincoln two months before his inauguration to complain about the loss of ten of his stagecoaches between Apache Pass and Tucson. Lincoln wants to ensure that Butterfield's coaches continue to bring the gold from California to help finance any possible conflict with the Southern United States, but cannot provide any assistance to Butterfield.

Grif Holbrook is on a stage which is stopped by apparent bandits who are in fact a posse led by sheriff Winters. Winters has a warrant for Holbrook for the theft of $2200. Grif, who had jumped from the stage before it stopped, turns the tables on Winters and his men but when he finds out who Winters is and why he stopped the stage, he gives himself up. Winters takes Holbrook to Butterfield who has arranged for the warrant as a ruse to get to speak to his ex-partner Grif so he can ask for help to stop the theft of his stages. Grif declines saying he is heading to California to buy a farm and retire.

Grif, having finally been convinced by Butterfield to take over his Tucson office, takes a stagecoach which stops at a stage post where Kate Crocker is to be relieved of her position at the post by one of Grif's fellow passengers. Kate is upset at losing her job but Grif says she can do the books at the Tucson office to which she agrees. On their way to Tucson they are held up by men, led by Ira Prentiss, in a black coach covered in steel. One of the men is to take the stage close enough to Tucson to drop the passengers off before stealing the coach. The other men are going to take Grif back to their base, after stealing his money. They imply to Grif that they are taking the coaches to help the southern cause. On their way to their base, Maroon ranch, Grif escapes after shooting the driver, former Butterfield employee and friend Sam. When Jim Maroon, leader of the gang and Maroon Wagon Trains, finds out that Grif was kidnapped instead of being killed as instructed is very angry.

Grif eventually makes it to the Tucson office where he is welcomed by Kate with a kiss, leading to a fight with Barney Broderick, who also fancies Kate and doesn't realize who Grif is. When he does, the fight stops and Barney tells Grif that he is to be Grif's assistant at the office. Grif takes a room at the hotel which is owned by former flame Annie Benson. Annie tells Grif that Sam is upstairs. Sam's has been shot in the leg and it is going gangrenous. Sam tries to shoot Holbrook and soon after Jim Maroon enters. Grif suspects that Sam tried to shoot him on Maroon's orders. Southern sympathiser Doc Banteen arrives and tells Sam his leg will have to come off. Downstairs Grif meets Prentiss and takes back the money previously stolen from him. Prentiss is getting cold feet about the stage thefts but is afraid to tell Grif who the leader is, though Grif suspects it's Maroon. Doc arrives and tells everyone that Sam is dead and it is Grif's fault. Just as a fight is about to start between Sam's friends and Grif and Barney, Annie arrives and explains what really happened leading to Sam's death and announces drinks will be on the house. Prentiss leaves followed by Grif who is followed by two of Maroon's gang. Before Prentiss can confirm who the leader of the gang is he is shot dead and there is a brief shootout between Grif and Barney and the two gangsters. One of the gangsters is killed and Barney identifies him as working for Maroon's stage company.

When Grif and Barney investigate another stage theft they are ambushed by Maroon's men but escape. They have another fight about whether Kate actually loves Grif even though she has accepted his proposal of marriage. After the next stage theft Grif sets off the local militia's cannon which is supposed to bring all the militia to town. He has a list of the militia members and tells Barney anyone who doesn't show up was probably in the gang that stole the stage. Just as the militia gathers a soldier arrives telling everyone war has been declared. Barney trails Gus Hayden, one of Maroon's gang, back to Maroon Farm where he sees Doc Banteen with Maroon but is then caught. Barney says he has quit Butterfield and wants to take up Maroon's previous job offer. Hayden doesn't believe him and argues with Maroon who hits him. Hayden's dog attacks Maroon who shoots it. Doc Banteen has to go to town for medicine to treat the dog bite on Maroon's arm. Maroon tells Doc to check whether Barney is telling the truth. Before he leaves Barney takes a flower he always wears in his hat and puts it in Doc's hat.

Kate is worried about Barney's absence and Grif realizes she loves Barney more than him. At her hotel Annie sees the feather in Doc's hat and realizes Barney is in trouble. She tells Doc he is being used by Maroon. Grif arrives and Doc tells him Barney is being held captive at Maroon's ranch, then offers to get the sheriff. Annie reveals she is married to Maroon but thought he was dead when she was involved with Grif and when she found out he was in jail decided to leave Grif.

Maroon is sending a wagon train with the stolen coaches back east, with Barney as one of the drivers, though he still doesn't trust him completely. Barney manages to lose his guard and heads for Tucson followed by Maroon and Hayden. They are spotted by Grif and the posse who chase them. Barney disconnects the team from his wagon which tips over. Maroon and Hayden jump off their wagon and Maroon says they need to fight the posse but Hayden disagrees. Hayden is still angry with Maroon for shooting his dog, when they argue Hayden kills Maroon. He then goes after Barney but is knocked out by Grif.

Barney joins the Union army as a sergeant and farewells Kate. Grif is a Union officer and farewells Annie with whom he has reconciled. As Grif and Barney leave on the stage, Doc Banteen and the townsfolk who have joined Confederates march through town.

== Cast ==
- Rod Cameron as Grif Holbrook
- Wayne Morris as Barney Broderick
- Kay Buckley as Kate Crocker
- Sally Eilers as Annie Benson
- Carl Benton Reid as Dr. Noah Banteen
- Roy Roberts as Jim Maroon
- Harry Bellaver as Gus Heyden
- Douglas Fowley as Ira Prentiss
