= Walter Colmes =

American film director and producer

Walter Colmes (1917–1988) was an American film director and producer sometimes billed as Walter S. Colmes. He directed six films between 1945 and 1947, including The Woman Who Came Back starring Nancy Kelly, Accomplice with Veda Ann Borg, The Burning Cross with Virginia Patton, and The French Key with Evelyn Ankers, and produced ten films between 1943 and 1947.
