= Monarch Books =

Monarch Books was an American publishing firm in the late 1950s/early 1960s which specialised in pulp novels. Some of these, like Jack the Ripper (1960), were movie tie-ins.

== Published novels (a sampler) ==
- 101 - Dark Hunger by Don James (1958)
- 102 - Winter Range by Alan Leman (1958) (Ⓒ 1932)
- 105 - Shadow of the Mafia by Louis Malley (1958)
- 107 - Wild to Possess by Gil Brewer (1959)
- 115 - Madigan's women by John Conway (1959)
- 123 - Beyond our Pleasure by James Kendricks (1959)
- 125 - Nikki by Stuart Friedman (1960)
- 131 - The Darkness of Love by Harry Olive (1960)
- 133 - The Flesh Peddlers by Frank Boyd (1960)
- 134 - Fury in the Heart by W. T. Ballard (1959)
- 136 - Not For A Curse by Karl Kramer (1959)
- 137 - Jailbait Street by Hal Ellson (1960)
- 140 - The Glory Jumpers by Delano Stagg (1960)
- 143 - Jack the Ripper by Stuart James (1960) – tie-in with the 1959 film of the same name
- 146 - A Girl Named Tamiko by Ronald Kirkbride (1960)
- 147 - Like Ice She Was by William Ard (1960)
- 149 - The Flesh and the Flame by Robert Carse (1960)
- 152 - The Sins of Billy Serene by William Ard (1960)
- 153 - Frisco Flat by Stuart James (1960)
- 173 - The Satyr by James McKimmey, Jr (1960)
- 184 - The Lovers of Pompeii by Theodore Pratt (1960)
- 187 - Appointment in Hell by Gil Brewer
- 196 - Lament for Julie by Robert Colby (1961)
- 199 - Brother and sister by Edwin West pseud. Donald Westlake (1961)
- 201 - The Fly Girls by Stuart Friedman (1960)
- 202 - Debbie by Paul Daniels (1960)
- 206 - By Passion Obsessed by V.J. Coberly (1961)
- 207 - The Strange Ways of Love by Clayton Matthews (1961)
- 212 - Beyond All Desire by Tom Phillips (1961)
- 221 - My father's wife by Jay Carr, pseud. James P Duff (1961)
- 241 - Rasputin: the Mad Monk by Stuart Friedman (1959) – tie-in with the film of the same name
- 252 - The Space Egg by Russ Winterbotham (1962)
- 253 - The Promiscuous Doll by Clayton Matthews (1962)
- 258 - Hollywood Starlet by Don James (1962)
- 262 - Tropic of Cleo by Rick Holmes (1962)
- 267 - More about Marmaduke by Brad Anderson, Phil Leeming (1962)
- 269 - Give Me This Woman by William Ard (1962)
- 275 - Save her for Loving by William Johnston (1962)
- 293 - Women of evil by Wenzell Brown (1963)
- 299 - Ruby by Paul Daniels (1963)
- 300 - King of the Harem Heaven by Anthony Sterling (1960)
- 304 - The Wicked, Wicked Women by James Kendricks
- 331 - Nude Running by Clayton Matthews (1963)
- 333 - The Texas Rangers by John Conway
- 339 - G. I. Girls by John Jakes (1963)
- 343 - Dark Hunger by Don James (1963)
- 361 - By Her Own hand by Frank Bonham (1963)
- 362 - Rest in Agony by Ivar Jorgensen (1963)
- 364 - Wild to Possess, 2nd Printing by Gil Brewer
- 377 - Nikki Revisited by Stuart Friedman (1963)
- 385 - My Neighbor's Wife by Sam Webster (1963)
- 387 - Company Girl by Nicholas Gorham (1963)
- 389 - Occasion of Sin by Robert William Taylor (1963)
- 394 - Pattern for Destruction by Paul Daniels
- 395 - The Violent Lady by Michael E. Knerr (1963)
- 397 - 21 Sunset Drive by Henry Ellsworth (1964)
- 403 - Sherry by Wenzell Brown (1964)
- 405 - The Jet Set by Mack Reynolds (1964)
- 412 - November Reef by Robert Maugham (1964)
- 413 - End of a Diplomat by Ronald Simpson (1964)
- 416 - In Savage Surrender by Whitman Chambers (1964)
- 420 - Louisa by Eric Allen (1964)
- 422 - Jealous by Paul Daniels
- 431 - Planet Big Zero by Franklin Hadley (1960)
- 444 - Play it Hard by Gil Brewer (1969)
- 445 - The Way we Love by Stuart Friedman (1964)
- 454 - New Doctor at Tower General by John J. Miller (1964)
- 465 - Hard Man from Texas by John Conway/Jack Thurston (1964)
- 468 Eve's Apple by Ronald Simpson (1961)
- 483 - The Girl from Big Pine by Talmage Powell (1964)
- 486 - The Damned and the Innocent by Glenn Canary (1964)
- 488 - Lament for Judy by Robert Colby (1964)
- 498 - She'll Get Hers by John Plunkett (1965)
- 524 - Unwed Mothers by Henry S. Galus (1962)
- 560 - The Man from Gunsight by William Chamberlain (1965)
- MM601 - The Stranglers of Bombay by Stuart James (1960) – tie-in with the 1959 film of the same name
- MM602 - The Brides of Dracula by Dean Owen (1960) – tie-in with the 1960 film of the same name
- MM603 - Gorgo by Carson Bingham (1960) – tie-in with the film of the same name
- MM604 - Konga by Dean Owen (1960) – tie-in with the film of the same name
- MM605 - Reptilicus by Dean Owen (1961) – tie-in with the 1961 film of the same name
- MM606 - The Street is My Beat by Carson Bingham (1961) – tie-in with the film of the same name
- MM607 - Mad Dog Coll by Steve Thurman (1961) – tie-in with the 1961 film of the same name
- MS1 - Fidel Castro Assassinated by Lee Duncan (1961)

== Published Nonfiction ==
- 435 - For every young heart: America's most popular singing idol talks to teenagers about growing up by Connie Francis
- 479 - Encyclopedia of the World's Great Events: 1964 (1965)
- 494 - Undertow by Helen Parkhurst (1965)
- K66 - Robert F. Kennedy, Assistant President by Gary Gordon, pseud. (1962)
- MA328 - Admiral "Bull" Halsey by Jack Pearl (1962)
- MA333 - The Texas Rangers by John Conway (1963)
- MB512 - Folk and Modern Medicine by Don James (1961)
- MB524 - Unwed Mothers by Henry S. Galus (1962)
- MB528 - Medical problems of women by Martin James (1962)
- MB530 - Virgin Wives by L T Woodward (1962)
- MB535 -The Sexually Promiscuous Female by Benjamin Morse, pseud. (1963)
- MB537 - The Sexually Promiscuous Male by Benjamin Morse, pseud. (1963)
- ML20 - Monarch Italian Phonetic Dictionary by Joseph Castelli (1961)
- MM543 - The Lesbian by Benjamin Morse (1961)
- MS2 - The Berlin Crisis by Deane & David Heller (1961)
- MS4 - The Rise and Fall of the Japanese Empire by Gary Gordon (pseud of I.G. Edmonds) (1962)
- MS5 - Planned Parenthood by Henry De Forrest (1962)
- MS6 - The Naked Rise of Communism by Frank L Kluckhorn
- MS7 - Forget about Calories by Leland H O'Brian (1962)
- MS8 - The Cold War by Deane and David Heller (1962)
- MS9 - A Gallery of the Saints by Randall Garrett (1963)
- MS10 - The History of Surgery by L.T. Woodward, pseud. (1963)
- MS11 - The Red Carpet by Ezra Taft Benson (1963)
- MS12 - The Kennedy Recession by Merryle Stanley Rukeyser (1963)
- MS13 - How to Stay Young and Beautiful by Jan Michael (1963)
- MS53 - America: Listen! by Frank L. Kluckhohn (1961)
- MS53A - America: Listen! by Frank L. Kluckhorn (1962) (New revised & enlarged)
- MS53B - America: Listen! by Frank L Kluckhorn (1963) (New enlarged edition)
- SB522 - The Attacks on our Free Choice by Merryle Stanley Rukeyser (1963)
- SP1 - First American in Space by Robert Silverberg (1961)
