= The French Key =

1946 film by Walter Colmes

- Theatrical release poster
- Directed by: Walter Colmes
- Screenplay by: Frank Gruber
- Produced by: Walter Colmes
- Starring: Albert Dekker; Mike Mazurki; Evelyn Ankers; John Eldredge; Frank Fenton; Selmer Jackson
- Cinematography: Jockey Arthur Feindel
- Edited by: Robert Jahns
- Music by: Alexander Laszlo
- Production company: Republic Pictures
- Distributed by: Republic Pictures
- Release date: May 18, 1946
- Running time: 64 minutes
- Country: United States
- Language: English

The French Key is a 1946 American mystery film directed by Walter Colmes and written by Frank Gruber. The film stars Albert Dekker, Mike Mazurki, Evelyn Ankers, John Eldredge, Frank Fenton and Selmer Jackson. The film was released on May 18, 1946, by Republic Pictures.

== Plot ==
The French Key is an adaptation of Gruber's novel of the same title, one of more than a dozen in a series featuring detective Johnny Fletcher. In this film Fletcher and his partner return to their hotel room and find a corpse clutching a gold coin. Attempting to solve the case, they deal with coin collectors and a pool room fight in addition to spending a night in jail.

== Cast ==
- Albert Dekker as Johnny Fletcher
- Mike Mazurki as Sam Cragg
- Evelyn Ankers as Janet Morgan
- John Eldredge as John Holterman
- Frank Fenton as Horatio Vedder
- Selmer Jackson as Walter Winslow
- Byron Foulger as Peabody
- Joe DeRita as Detective Fox
- Marjorie Manners as Betty Winslow
- David Gorcey as Eddie Miller
- Archie Twitchell Murdock
- Sammy Stein as Percy
- Alan Ward as Madigan
- Walter Soderling as George Polson
- Emmett Vogan as Desk Clerk
