= Accomplice (film) =

1946 black-and-white film directed by Walter Colmes

- Directed by: Walter Colmes
- Written by: Irving Elman
- Screenplay by: Frank Gruber
- Based on: Simon Lash, Private Detective by Frank Gruber
- Produced by: John K. Teaford
- Starring: Richard Arlen; Veda Ann Borg; Tom Dugan; Archie Twitchell
- Cinematography: Jockey Arthur Feindel
- Edited by: Robert Jahns
- Music by: Alexander Laszlo
- Color process: Black-and-white
- Production company: Producers Releasing Corporation
- Distributed by: Producers Releasing Corporation
- Release date: September 29, 1946
- Running time: 68 minutes
- Country: United States
- Language: English

Accomplice is a 1946 American thriller film directed by Walter Colmes and starring Richard Arlen, Veda Ann Borg, Tom Dugan, and Archie Twitchell. The film, from Producers Releasing Corporation (PRC), was shot in four days. The film was written by Frank Gruber, based on his novel Simon Lash, Private Detective.

== Plot ==
Blonde bombshell Joyce Bonniwell hires her ex-fiancé and Los Angeles attorney, Simon Lash. Her amnesiatic and wealthy husband Sam Bonniwell has gone missing. Sam is the vice president of the Sheridan National Bank in Los Angeles.

Simon searches out what is going on at the bank. The bank's president, Vincent Springer, assures all is well with the bank and that Sam is on vacation.

Simon's legal assistant, Eddie Slocum, is sent to check out Sam's gentlemen's club. He uncovers a letter to Sam from a Mrs. James Baker. A beautiful redhead, Evelyn Price, answers the door. She admits to having an affair with Sam but that she has not seen him for several days although he may be taking refuge at the Castleman's Mink Ranch, a place he owns near Palmdale.

Simon starts to suspect that Joyce might be seeking out hard evidence of Sam's infidelity, possibly for divorce proceedings. Simon wants to drop the assignment as he does not investigate divorce cases.

Simon enters Joyce's house and a phone call comes through from local sheriff Rucker. He tells Joyce that Sam's body is at Castleman's Mink Ranch with a gunshot to the head.

Simon accompanies Joyce to the ranch to identify the body. When they arrive together to the crime scene, the sheriff starts to suspect that Simon and Joyce have murdered Sam to get his money from the inheritance.

Castleman, however, believes that Bonniwell committed suicide. Simon determines that there is clear evidence of two shots, and understands that Bonniwell could not have killed himself. Joyce tells the sheriff that Sam had lost all his money. She denies any knowledge of the ranch and of Sam's relationship with Evelyn.

Simon contacts Eddie by phone, and receives information that both Evelyn and bank president Springer have disappeared without a trace. Simon looks into a hotel that Sam frequented during his visits, and finds out that he used to come visit town in the company of a pretty brunette, whom he claimed to be his wife. Rucker later reports that a brunette that fits the description has been seen driving Sam's car into the desert. Simon learns from Joyce that the bank president's fiancée is a brunette, and decides to find the woman.

Before Simon has time to leave, he gets information that both Evelyn and Castleman have been murdered. Simon tries to put the pieces of the puzzle together, and decides to travel to Mesa in New Mexico. When he arrives there he talks to the town marshal, Jeff Bailey, who tells him that a man named Stringer drove through town some time ago, in the direction of Pete Connors' large estate, known as the Castle.

When Simon comes to the Castle, the owner Pete Connors reveals that Bailey is his nephew. Simon is taken by surprise. He is locked into an old harness room. He sees how Joyce arrives to the house by car and manages to break out of the room. Joyce explains that she headed for the Castle after she found out Springer had telephoned Connors' number.

Joyce then tries to kill Simon, and he understands that she is the one who murdered all three victims. He tells her that he knows what she has done, and that he guessed she wore a brunette wig to masquerade herself as Springer's fiancée, and murdered Springer at the mink ranch because he discovered that Sam was embezzling from the bank.

Simon then continues to explain that Evelyn, who was really Springer's mistress, not Sam's, and Castleman both were murdered to prevent them from revealing the truth. Sam, who is alive and hiding at the Castle, then appears. There is a gunfight, where Sam accidentally kills both Connors and Joyce, and then is himself killed by Simon.

== Cast ==
- Richard Arlen as Simon Lash
- Veda Ann Borg as Joyce Kimball Bonniwell
- Tom Dugan as Eddie Slocum
- Archie Twitchell as Sheriff Rucker (as Michael Branden)
- Marjorie Manners as Evelyn Price
- Earle Hodgins as Jeff Bailey
- Francis Ford as King Connors
- Edward Earle as Jim Bonniwell
- Herbert Rawlinson as Vincent Springer
- Sherry Hall as Ben Castleman
- Robert McKenzie as Barstow Gas Station Attendant
