= Bob Mitchell (television writer) =

American television writer

- Born: Robert Junior Mitchell; April 27, 1918; Casper, Wyoming, U.S.
- Died: October 13, 1992 (aged 74); Northridge, California, U.S.
- Occupation: Television writer
- Spouse: Esther Mitchell (m. 1942)
- Children: 2

Robert Junior Mitchell (April 27, 1918 – October 13, 1992) was an American television writer. He wrote for television programs including Highway Patrol, Buck Rogers in the 25th Century, Combat!, Land of the Giants, Charlie's Angels, Hawaii Five-O, Cannon, Perry Mason, The High Chaparral, CHiPs, Shotgun Slade, Schlitz Playhouse, Maverick and The Outsider.

Mitchell died on October 13, 1992 in a car crash in Northridge, California, at the age of 74.
