= Johnny Fletcher =

- First appearance: The French Key
- Last appearance: Swing Low, Swing Dead
- Created by: Frank Gruber
- Portrayed by: Albert Dekker; Bill Goodwin

In-universe information
- Gender: Male
- Occupation: Detective
- Nationality: American

Johnny Fletcher is a fictional character created by Frank Gruber. Fletcher is a con-man and reluctant amateur detective. The character was the protagonist of several mystery novels published between 1940 and 1964. Additionally, he was featured in a feature film adaptation scripted by Gruber, and a short lived radio series.

== Overview ==
Fletcher and his sidekick Sam Cragg are small time scam artists. Fletcher is the brains, and the muscular Cragg the brawn. They often stumble upon crimes, and reluctantly end attempting to solve them. They often pose as private detectives.

== List of stories ==
=== Novels ===
- The French Key a.k.a. Once Over Deadly (1940)
- The Laughing Fox (1940)
- The Hungry Dog a.k.a. Die Like a Dog (1941)
- The Navy Colt (1941)
- The Talking Clock (1941)
- The Gift Horse a.k.a. Heir to Homicide (1942)
- The Mighty Blockhead a.k.a. The Corpse Moved Upstairs (1942)
- The Silver Tombstone a.k.a. The Silver Tombstone Mystery (1945)
- The Honest Dealer a.k.a. Double Dealer (1947)
- The Whispering Master (1947)
- The Scarlet Feather a.k.a. The Gamecock Murder (1948)
- The Leather Duke a.k.a. A Job of Murder (1949)
- The Limping Goose (1954)
- The Corpse Moved Upstairs (1964)
- Swing Low Swing Dead (1964)

=== Short stories ===
- The Sad Serbian (1939) (features Sam Cragg only)
- The Laughing Fox (1940)

== Adaptations ==
=== Film ===
In 1946, Gruber adapted The French Key into a feature film, starring Albert Dekker as Fletcher and Mike Mazurki as Cragg.

=== Radio series ===
Johnny Fletcher
- Other names: A Johnny Fletcher Mystery
- Running time: 30 minutes
- Country of origin: United States
- Language: English
- Syndicates: ABC
- Starring: Bill Goodwin; Sheldon Leonard
- Announcer: Owen James; John Storm
- Created by: Frank Gruber
- Written by: Frank Gruber
- Produced by: Bill Rousseau; Hal Finberg
- Original release: May 30 – November 27, 1948

Johnny Fletcher is an American old-time radio comedy-detective drama. It was broadcast weekly on ABC from May 30, 1948, until November 27, 1948. The program was also known as A Johnny Fletcher Mystery.

Radio historian Jim Cox, in his book, Radio Crime Fighters: Over 300 Programs from the Golden Age, describes Fletcher as "inept" and "frequently drunk". The program's plots usually involved murder or other kinds of mayhem that Fletcher and his partner, Sam Cragg, tried to solve. As an example, "The Whispering Master" episode (previewed in a contemporary newspaper) began with an "unidentified but beautiful young woman" kissing Fletcher and suddenly departing, leaving behind a popular recording. As the plot unfolded, Fletcher had to solve the murder of the singer who recorded the song.

Gruber originally sold the rights to his Fletcher novels to NBC in 1946. An audition recording of Johnny Fletcher Mysteries featured Albert Dekker as Fletcher and Mike Mazurki as Sam, reprising their roles from the film version of The French Key. The pilot episode was an adaptation of the novel, The Navy Colt. Two years later, ABC bought the rights to the program from NBC and produced Johnny Fletcher.

On the ABC version, Fletcher was portrayed by Bill Goodwin, while Sam was played by Sheldon Leonard. The announcers were Owen James and John Storm. Gruber wrote the scripts, and Buzz Adlam provided the music. Producers were Bill Rousseau and Hal Finberg.

=== Television ===
Gruber wrote the April 4, 1950 episode of the anthology series Suspense titled 1000 To One. Paul Stewart appeared as the Sam Cragg character. Fletcher did not appear.

The February 20, 1961, issue of the trade magazine Broadcasting included Johnny Fletcher in a list of pilots being prepared for the 1961-1962 season. Gruber was the producer of the episode, which starred John Goddard and Read Morgan.
