= Woman Who Came Back =

1945 film by Walter Colmes

- Directed by: Walter Colmes
- Screenplay by: Dennis Cooper; Lee Willis
- Story by: John Kafka
- Starring: John Loder; Nancy Kelly; Otto Kruger
- Cinematography: Henry Sharp
- Edited by: John F. Link
- Production company: Republic Pictures Corp.
- Distributed by: Republic Pictures Corp.
- Release date: 13 December 1945
- Running time: 68 minutes
- Country: United States

Woman Who Came Back is a 1945 horror film directed by Walter Colmes and starring John Loder, Nancy Kelly, and Otto Kruger. The film concerns an offbeat woman who becomes convinced that she is a witch, a conclusion which eventually leads to mass hysteria in the town to which she has recently returned.

== Plot ==
Lorna Webster is the last descendant of witch-hunter Elijah Webster, who burned fifteen women at the stake for witchcraft. After abandoning her fiancé, local doctor Matt Adams, at the altar two years before, Lorna is returning to her New England hometown when the bus she is riding on crashes. The bodies of only twelve out of thirteen victims are recovered. The missing corpse belongs to an old woman who had been wearing a black veil and was sitting next to Lorna when the bus lost control.

After a series of strange incidents, including a bouquet of flowers wilting at her touch, Lorna begins to believe that a supernatural force is taking control of her life. She begins to study the papers of Elijah Websters and finds a confession that explains a strange pact between a witch and the devil. When the witch dies, her spirit will pass into the body of the nearest young woman, who will gain her dark powers. Lorna believes that she is the latest vessel for the witch's power, the previous being the mysterious old woman whose body was never found.

The local townspeople become suspicious and alarmed, believing that Lorna caused the illness of young Peggy, Matt's niece. Desperate to prove that there is nothing supernatural affecting the town or the woman he loves, Matt finds the personal journal of Elijah Webster: it reveals Webster forged confessions of witchcraft to further his political standing. Matt hurries to show Lorna the journal, but finds her house being attacked by some of the townspeople and Lorna fleeing in terror. Lorna hallucinates and falls into the river. Matt saves her and, in the process finds the body of the old woman. Now understanding that she had been a victim of superstition, Lorna stays in town and marries Matt.

== Cast ==
- John Loder as Dr. Matt Adams
- Nancy Kelly as Lorna Webster
- Otto Kruger as Rev. Jim Stevens
- Ruth Ford as Ruth Gibson
- Harry Tyler as Noah
- Jeanne Gail as Peggy Gibson
- Almira Sessions as Bessie
- J. Farrell MacDonald as Sheriff
- Emmett Vogan as Dr. Peters

== Production ==
Woman Who Came Back was shot at Chaplin Studios in April 1945. The film was developed under the working title The Web.

== Release ==
Woman Who Came Back was distributed by Republic Pictures Corp. on December 13, 1945. It was also released on DVD in 1999 by Image Entertainment. In 2023 a 4K restoration was made from the original negative, and the restoration was released as a limited edition Blu-Ray in 2024 by Imprint.
