= Tales of Wells Fargo =

American Western television series (1957–1962)

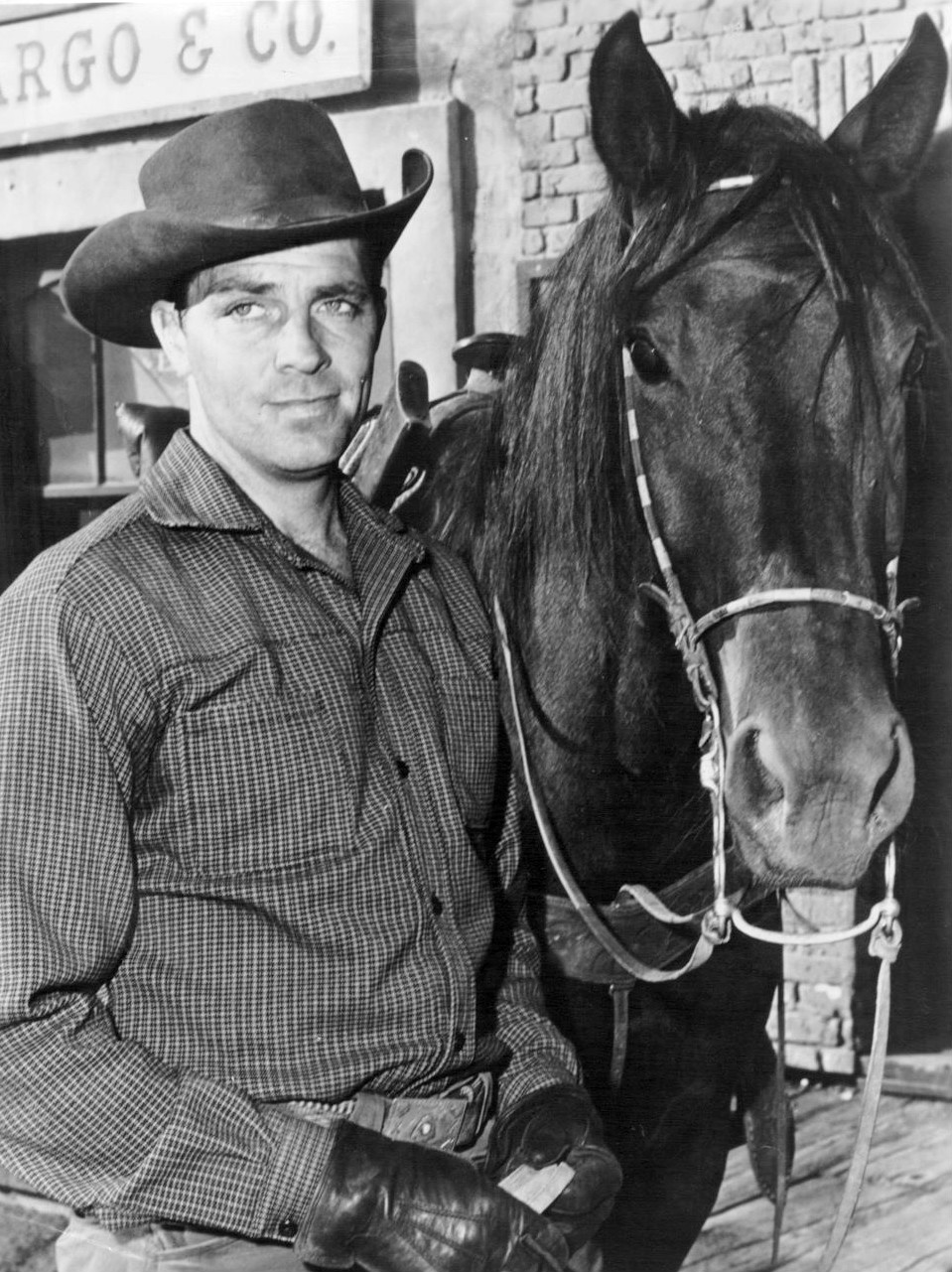
- Dale Robertson as James "Jim" Whitcomb Hardie, 1958
- Genre: Western
- Created by: James Brooks; Frank Gruber; Gene Reynolds
- Directed by: Earl Bellamy; William F. Claxton; Lewis R. Foster; Jerry Hopper; Leslie H. Martinson; Gene Reynolds; Sidney Salkow; R. G. Springsteen; George Waggner; William Witney
- Starring: Dale Robertson; William Demarest; Virginia Christine; Jack Ging
- Theme music composer: Mort Greene; Harry Warren; Stanley Wilson
- Composers: Paul Dunlap; Michael Greene; Melvyn Lenard; Morton Stevens; Harry Sukman; John Williams
- Country of origin: United States
- Original language: English
- No. of seasons: 6
- No. of episodes: 201 (list of episodes)

Production
- Producers: Nat Holt; Earle Lyon
- Running time: 30 minutes (1957–1961); 60 minutes (1961–1962)
- Production companies: Overland Productions; Revue Studios

Original release
- Network: NBC
- Release: March 18, 1957 – June 2, 1962

Tales of Wells Fargo is an American Western television series starring Dale Robertson in 201 episodes that aired from 1957 to 1962 on NBC. Produced by Revue Productions, the series aired in a half-hour format until its final season, when it expanded to a full hour and switched from black-and-white to color.

== Synopsis ==
Set in the 1870s and 1880s, the series starred Oklahoma native Dale Robertson as Wells Fargo special agent Jim Hardie, noted at the time as "the left-handed gun". The character was fictional, but the series' development was influenced by the biography of Wells Fargo detective Fred J. Dodge. Agent Hardie was shown working cases in many areas of the Old West, occasionally interacting with legendary outlaws such as Jesse James and Belle Starr, as well as with other American historical figures. Hardie's own history was rarely discussed, but one episode gave a detailed backstory, portraying him as a Louisiana-born drifter who almost became an outlaw before finding his true mission in life.

In the final season, when episodes were longer, Hardie was given a base of operations, on a new ranch in a town called Gloribee, and four regular supporting characters were added. He was even joined by a Wells Fargo partner, the former henchman of a Confederate insurrectionist, for the first half of the season.

Throughout the series Hardie often rode a chestnut gelding with a white blaze on his face and four white stockings. The horse belonged to Dale Robertson, and was named "Jubilee".

== Cast ==
=== Lead ===
- Dale Robertson as Jim Hardie, Wells Fargo agent

=== Recurring ===
- Edgar Buchanan as "Doc" Bob Dawson (1957-1961, 6 episodes)
- Jack Ging as Beau McCloud (1961, 13 episodes), he also appeared in a 1959 episode in another role
- William Demarest as Jeb Gaine (1961–1962)
- Virginia Christine as Ovie (1961–1962)
- Lory Patrick as Tina (1961–1962)
- Mary Jayne Saunders as Mary Gee Swenson (1961–1962)

=== Notable guest stars ===
- Nick Adams
- Stanley Adams
- Claude Akins, 5 times, once as John L. Sullivan
- Rico Alaniz
- Eddie Albert
- Chris Alcaide
- Fred Aldrich
- Robert Anderson
- Morris Ankrum
- Roscoe Ates
- Roy Barcroft, 5 times
- Trevor Bardette
- Bob Bailey
- Rayford Barnes
- Baynes Barron
- Hugh Beaumont as Jesse James
- John Beradino, 3 times
- Lyle Bettger 2 times as John Wesley Hardin
- Dan Blocker
- Nesdon Booth
- Lane Bradford, 5 times
- Stewart Bradley
- Steve Brodie
- Charles Bronson as Butch Cassidy
- Johnny Mack Brown
- Walter Burke
- Terry Burnham
- Julian Burton
- King Calder
- Harry Carey Jr.
- Robert Carricart
- James Chandler
- Stephen Chase
- John Cliff
- James Coburn
- Fred Coby
- Chuck Connors twice, once as Sam Bass
- Bill Coontz
- Ben Cooper
- Jeanne Cooper as Belle Starr
- Ellen Corby
- Walter Coy, 3 times
- Yvonne Craig
- Richard H. Cutting
- Royal Dano as Cole Younger
- Cesare Danova as Tiburcio Vasquez
- Jim Davis
- John Dehner, 4 times (3 as bounty hunter Wade Cather)
- Francis DeSales
- Richard Devon
- Brad Dexter
- Kem Dibbs
- John Doucette, 4 times
- Dan Duryea
- Buddy Ebsen
- Jack Elam
- Donald Elson
- Bill Erwin
- Frank Ferguson, 5 times
- Duke Fishman
- Paul Fix, 3 times, once as Philip Sheridan
- Ron Foster
- Byron Foulger, 3 times
- Beverly Garland as Pearl Hart
- Anthony George
- Sam Gilman
- John Goddard
- Bruce Gordon
- Leo Gordon
- Tom Greenway
- Dabbs Greer
- Herman Hack
- Neil Hamilton
- Chick Hannan
- Ron Hayes
- Myron Healey, 4 times
- Anne Helm as Nellie Bly
- Peter Helm
- Kelo Henderson as Ike Clanton
- Tom Hennesy
- Robert 'Buzz' Henry
- Robert Hinkle
- Michael Hinn
- Ed Hinton
- Harry Holcombe
- Rex Holman
- Rodolfo Hoyos Jr., 4 times
- Clegg Hoyt
- Richard Jaeckel
- Brad Johnson
- Chubby Johnson, 4 times
- I. Stanford Jolley
- Dean Jones
- L.Q. Jones, 2 times
- Ray Jones
- Bobby Jordan as Bob Ford
- Robert Karnes
- DeForest Kelley
- Ray Kellogg
- Warren J. Kemmerling
- Don Kennedy
- Douglas Kennedy
- George Keymas
- Wright King
- Jess Kirkpatrick
- Fred Krone
- Jack Lambert
- Martin Landau as Doc Holliday
- Michael Landon, 3 times, twice as Wells Fargo rider Tad Cameron
- John Lasell
- Wesley Lau
- Tom Laughlin
- Norman Leavitt, 3 times
- Tina Louise
- Barbara Luna
- Herbert Lytton
- Tyler MacDuff
- Barton MacLane
- Donna Martell
- Carole Mathews
- Ken Mayer
- Ann McCrea
- Lin McCarthy
- Frank McGrath
- Steve McQueen as Bill Longley
- Tyler McVey
- Joyce Meadows
- Don Megowan as Ben Thompson
- Jan Merlin
- Robert Middleton, 4 times
- John Milford
- James Millhollin
- Frank Mills
- Ewing Mitchell
- George Mitchell
- Gerald Mohr
- Rita Moreno
- Jeff Morrow
- Alan Napier
- Anna Navarro
- Ed Nelson
- Jack Nicholson
- Leonard Nimoy
- Jimmy Noel
- Hal Jon Norman
- Simon Oakland
- Warren Oates
- J. Pat O'Malley
- Patricia Owens
- Gregg Palmer, 4 times
- Dennis Patrick
- Luana Patten
- Wynn Pearce
- John M. Picard
- Phillip Pine as Kid Curry
- Edward Platt, 3 times, as Tom Bell
- Joe Ploski
- Sydney Pollack
- Denver Pyle
- Mike Ragan
- Gilman Rankin
- Jack Reitzen
- Stafford Repp, 3 times
- Addison Richards as Lew Wallace
- Paul Richards as Johnny Ringo
- Jason Robards Sr.
- Stephen Roberts
- Willard Sage
- Robert Sampson
- Walter Sande, 3 times
- Hugh Sanders
- George Sawaya
- Frank J. Scannell
- Vito Scotti, 3 times
- George Selk
- Richard Shannon
- Alex Sharp
- Dan Sheridan
- Roy N. Sickner
- Olan Soule, 4 times
- George Sowards
- Warren Stevens as Clay Allison
- Boyd Stockman, 14 times
- Guy Stockwell
- Glenn Strange, 3 times
- Barbara Stuart
- Olive Sturgess
- Brick Sullivan
- Grant Sullivan
- William Tannen, 7 times
- Vaughn Taylor
- Guy Teague
- Ray Teal
- Robert Tetrick
- Russell Thorson, 8 times (6 as Wells Fargo managers)
- Jack Tornek
- Lee Van Cleef
- Robert Vaughn as Billy the Kid
- Gregory Walcott
- Alan Wells
- Dawn Wells
- Adam West
- Peter Whitney
- Robert J. Wilke
- Guinn "Big Boy" Williams
- Will Wright, 3 times

== Episodes ==
Season	Episodes	Originally released		Rank	Average viewership (in millions)	Run Time	Color
Season	Episodes	First released	Last released	Rank	Average viewership (in millions)	Run Time	Color
1	14	March 18, 1957	July 8, 1957	3	14.8	30 min	black & white
2	38	September 9, 1957	May 26, 1958	7	13.3	30 min	black & white
3	39	September 8, 1958	June 15, 1959	Not in top 30	N/A	30 min	black & white
4	37	September 7, 1959	May 30, 1960	Not in top 30	N/A	30 min	black & white
5	39	September 5, 1960	July 10, 1961	Not in top 30	N/A	30 min	black & white
6	34	September 30, 1961	June 2, 1962	Not in top 30	N/A	60 min	color

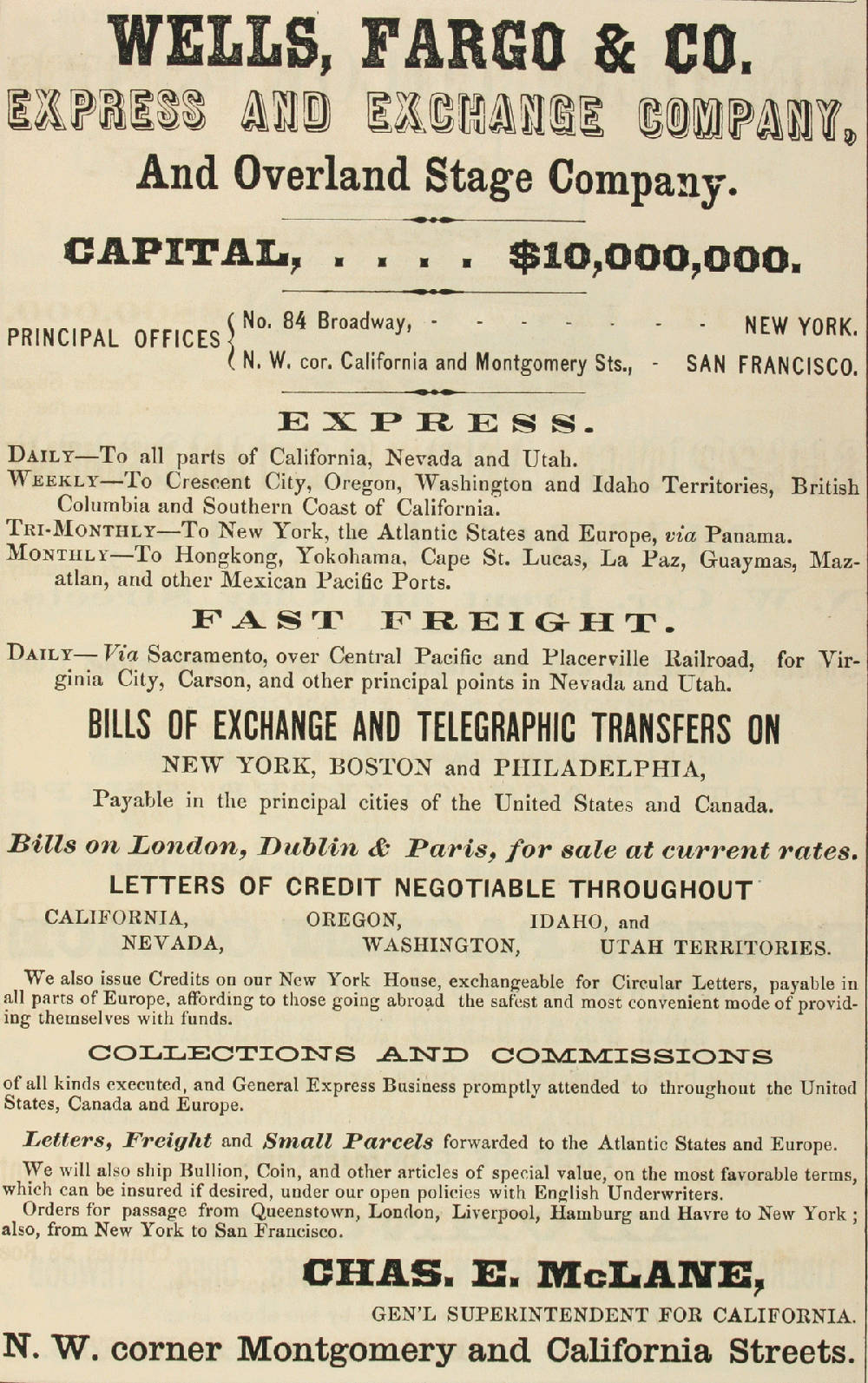
1867 advertisement showing the variety of services offered by Wells, Fargo & Co.

== Production ==
Nat Holt was the producer of Tales of Wells Fargo. It initially was broadcast on Mondays from 8:30 to 9 p.m. Eastern Time. Pall Mall and General Foods were the sponsors.

Leslie H. Martinson directed the first 2 episodes, which were written by N.B. Stone Jr. and Dwight Newton respectively. Other directors over the show's 6 seasons included Sidney Salkow, Earl Bellamy, Lewis R. Foster, William Witney, George Waggner and R.G. Springsteen. Co-creator Frank Gruber wrote several episodes, including one co-written by L. Ron Hubbard. Other notable writers included novelist Louis L'Amour (who provided story ideas scripted by others), Cyril Hume, Mark Hanna, Steve Fisher and Sam Peckinpah.

== Critical response ==
A review of the series' first episode in the trade publication Variety described the show as "strictly formula, with none of the characterization or human values that have embellished the better class of TV westerns to date." It said that Robertson seemed "authoritative enough" in his role but compared the overall product to the lesser of two films in a double feature. In summary the review said that the show was better suited for syndication because "network exposure implies the willingness to depart from the routine."

== Release ==
=== Broadcast ===
The pilot for Tales of Wells Fargo originally premiered as an episode of the anthology series Schlitz Playhouse of Stars. “A Tale of Wells Fargo” aired on December 14, 1956, with Robertson as Jim Hardie. It was directed by Bernard Girad and written by Frank Gruber, based on a story that he wrote with Zane Grey.

In the 1960–61 season, Wells Fargo was scheduled opposite ABC's detective series Surfside 6 and CBS's new sitcom Bringing Up Buddy, starring Frank Aletter. In its final season, it moved to Saturday nights, putting it in direct competition with Perry Mason.

In the United States, reruns of the series can be seen on the GRIT channel.

=== Home media ===
Timeless Media Group released the first two seasons on DVD in Region 1.

DVD name	Ep #	Release date
The Complete First and Second Seasons	52	October 25, 2011

== Ratings ==
For its first two years, the series was in the top 10 of the Nielsen Ratings. During the 1957–58 season, it was ranked number three, and during the 1958–59 season, it was ranked number seven.

== Merchandise ==
The television series also spawned a number of publications for young readers, including the hardcover book Danger at Dry Creek (Golden Press, 1959), and a series of Dell Comics and Little Golden Books. Amongst the uncredited artists who created the comic book adaptation were Dan Spiegle, Gil Kane, Alberto Giolitti and Russ Heath. A hardcover & paperback collection of 8 teleplays, written by Frank Gruber, was released in 1958 by Bantam Books.
