= Frank Gruber =

American novelist (1904–1969)

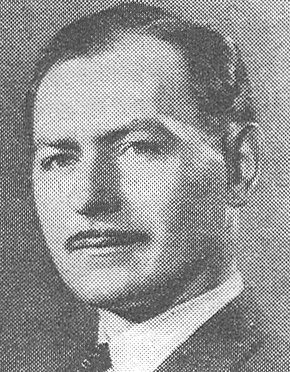
- Born: February 2, 1904; Elmer, Minnesota, United States
- Died: December 9, 1969 (aged 65); Santa Monica, California, United States
- Occupation: Writer
- Writing career
- Language: English
- Genres: Western, detective fiction, pulp

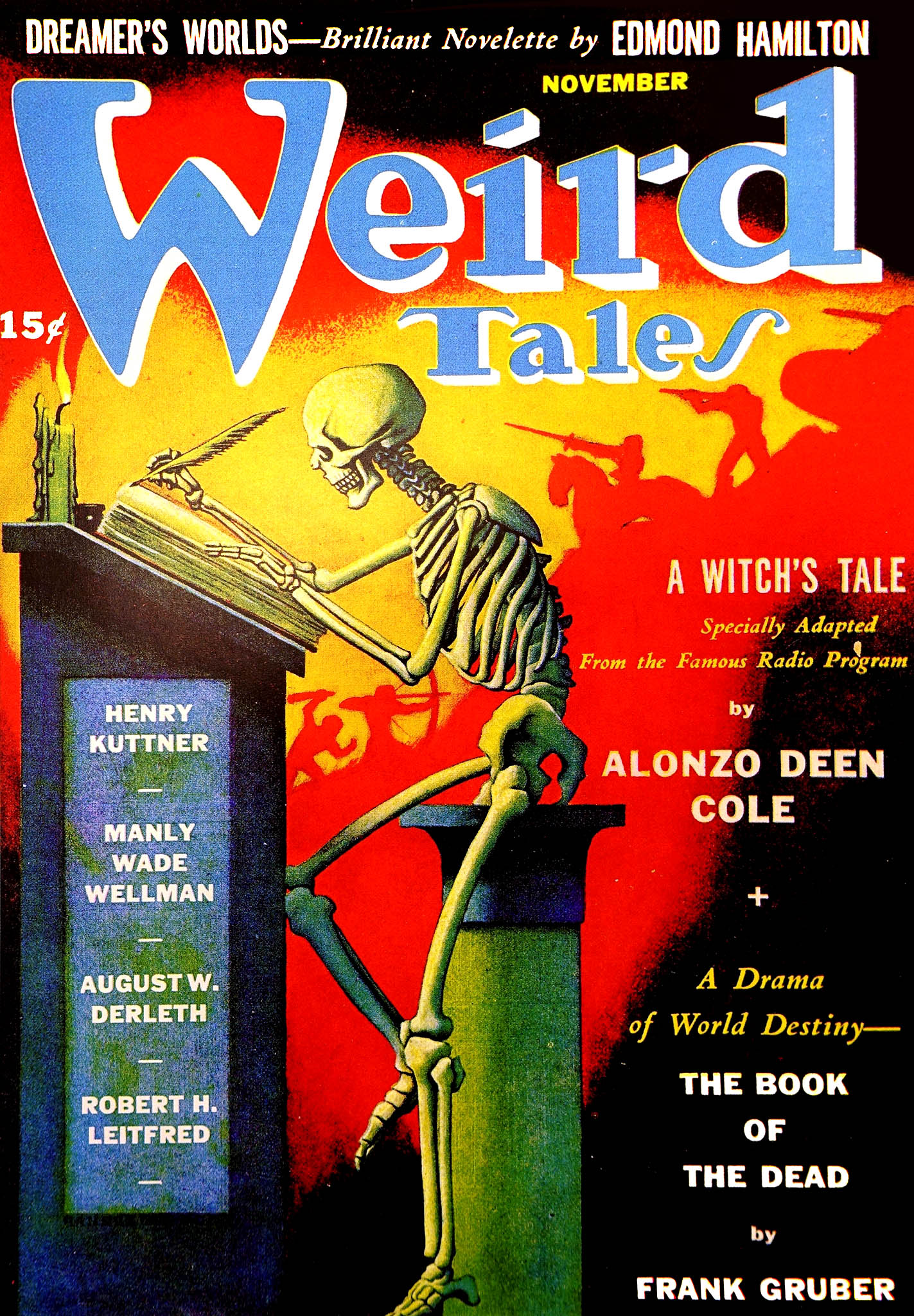
Gruber's "The Book of the Dead" was the cover story in the November 1941 Weird Tales

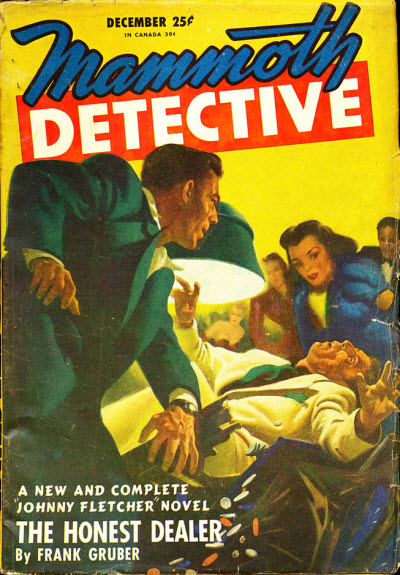
Gruber's novella "The Honest Dealer" took the cover of the December 1946 issue of Mammoth Detective

Frank Gruber (born February 2, 1904, Elmer, Minnesota, died December 9, 1969, Santa Monica, California) was an American writer of short stories, novels, and screenplays. Included in his work are stories for pulp fiction magazines, dozens of novels (mostly Westerns and detective yarns) and scripts for Hollywood movies and television shows. He sometimes wrote under the pen names Stephen Acre, Charles K. Boston and John K. Vedder, and also was the creator of three TV series.

== Career ==
Gruber said that as a nine-year-old newsboy, he read his first book, Luke Walton, the Chicago Newsboy by Horatio Alger. During the next seven years he read a hundred more Alger books and said they influenced him professionally more than anything else in his life. They told how poor boys became rich, but what they instilled in Gruber was an ambition, at age nine or ten, to be an author. He had written his first book before age 11, using a pencil on wrapping paper.

Age 13 or 14, his ambition died for a while but several years later it rose again and he started submitting stories to various magazines, like Smart Set and Atlantic Monthly. Getting rejected, he lowered his sights to The Saturday Evening Post and Colliers, with no more success. The pulps were getting noticed and Gruber tried those but with no success. As a story came back with a rejection slip, he would post it off again to someone else, so he could have as many as 40 stories going back and forth at different times, costing him about a third of his earnings in postage. Erle Stanley Gardner called him the fighter who licked his weight in rejection slips.

Gruber served in the US Army from 1920 to 1921. Gruber said that, while in the Army, he learned how to manipulate the dice to throw 35 consecutive sevens, but that he had "lost this skill through lack of practice".

February 1927, he finally sold a story. It was bought by The United Brethren Publishing House of Dayton. It was called "The Two Dollar Raise" and he got a cheque through for three dollars and fifty cents.

Answering an ad in The Chicago Tribune, he got a job editing a small farm paper. In September he got a better paid job in Iowa and soon found himself editing five farm papers. He had much money and even wrote some articles for the papers but found he had no time to write the stories he wanted to write.

In 1932 the Depression hit, and he lost his job. 1932 to 1934 were his bad years. He wrote and wrote, many stories typed out on an old "Remington" but of the Sunday School stories, the spicy sex stories, the detective stories, the sports stories, the love stories, very few sold, with some companies paying him as little as a quarter of a cent per word. He had a few successes and remained in Mt. Morris, Illinois for 14 months before deciding to head to New York on July 1, 1934.

There were numerous publishing houses in New York and he could save money on postage but this led to him walking miles to deliver manuscripts as he had so little money, not even enough for food most of the time. He stayed in a room in the Forty Fourth Street Hotel ($10.50 per week).

In his book, The Pulp Jungle (1967), Gruber details the struggles (for a long time, at least once a day he had tomato soup, which was free hot water in a bowl, with free crackers crumbled in and half a bottle of tomato sauce added) he had for a few years and numerous fellow authors he became friendly with, many of whom were famous or later became famous.

Early December 1934 and with endless rejection slips, he got a phone call from Rogers Terrill. Could he do a 5,500 word filler story for Operator #5 pulp magazine by next day? He did and got paid. Even better, they wanted another one next month, and another. He was then asked to do a filler for Ace Sports pulp, which sold. Gruber's income from writing in 1934 was under $400. In 1935, his stories were suddenly wanted and he earned $10,000 that year. His wife came to live with him (she had been living with relatives) and he lived the good life, moving into a big apartment and buying a Buick ($750).

January 1942, Gruber decided to try Hollywood, having heard about the huge sums some stories sold for and stayed there till 1946.

Gruber—who stated that only seven types of Westerns existed—wrote more than 300 stories for over 40 pulp magazines, as well as more than 60 novels, which had sold more than 90 million copies in 24 countries, sixty five screenplays, and a hundred television scripts. 25 of his books have sold to motion pictures, and he created three TV series: Tales of Wells Fargo, The Texan and Shotgun Slade. His first novel, The Peace Marshall, which was rejected by every agent in New York at the time, became a film called The Kansan, starring Richard Dix. The book has been reprinted many times with total sales of over one million copies.

He bragged that he could write a complete mystery novel in 16 days and then use the other 14 days of the month to knock out a historical serial for a magazine. His mystery novels included The French Key (for which he sold the motion picture rights for $14,000 in 1945) and The Laughing Fox.

He was a social drinker in the thirties (regular parties for authors were alcohol only with no food provided), being too busy to become a hard drinker, but later just about gave up alcohol.

== Filmography ==
=== Films ===
Year	Film	Credit	Notes
1939	Death of a Champion	Story	Adapted from his novel Peace Marshal
1943	The Kansan	Story	
1943	Northern Pursuit	Screenplay	Co-screenwriter with Alvah Bessie
1944	The Mask of Dimitrios	Screenplay	Based on the novel of the same title by Eric Ambler
1945	Oregon Trail	StorySt	Adapted from his novel Gunsight
1945	Johnny Angel	Screenplay	Based on the short story "Mr. Angel Comes Aboard" by Charles Gordon Booth; Co-screenwriter with Steve Fisher
1946	Terror by Night	Screenplay	
1946	The French Key	Writer	Adapted from his novel The French Key
1946	Dressed To Kill	Screenplay	Co-screenwriter with Leonard Lee
1946	In Old Sacramento	Screenplay	Co-screenwriter with Frances Hyland
1946	Accomplice	Writer	Adapted from his novel Simon Lash, Private Detective; Co-screenwriter with Irving Elman
1947	Bulldog Drummond at Bay	Screenplay	Based on the novel of the same title by H. C. McNeile
1948	The Challenge	Screenplay	Based on a novel by H. C. McNeile
1949	Fighting Man of the Plains	Writer	Adapted from his novel Fighting Man
1950	Dakota Lil	Story	
1950	The Cariboo Trail	Screenplay	Based on a story by John Rhodes Sturdy
1951	The Great Missouri Raid	Writer	Adapted from his novel Broken Lance
1951	The Texas Rangers	Story	
1951	Warpath	Writer	Adapted from his novel Broken Lance
1951	Silver City	Screenplay	Based on a story by Luke Short
1952	Flaming Feather	Screenplay	Additional Dialogue
1952	Denver and Rio Grande	Writer	
1952	Hurricane Smith	Screenplay	Based on the novel Hurricane Williams by Gordon Ray Young
1953	Pony Express	Story	
1955	Rage at Dawn	Story	
1956	Backlash	Story	Adapted from his novel Fort Starvation
1956	Tension at Table Rock	Story	Adapted from his novel Bitter Sage
1956	Man in the Vault	Story	Adapted from his novel The Lock and the Key
1957	The Big Land	Story	Adapted from his novel Buffalo Grass
1961	Twenty Plus Two	Writer & Producer	Adapted from his novel Twenty Plus Two
1965	Town Tamer	Writer, Actor	Role: Hotel Clerk
1965	Arizona Raiders	Story	Co-writer with Richard Schayer
1968	White Comanche	Writer	

=== Television ===
Year	TV Series	Credit	Notes
1950	Suspense	Writer	1 Episode
1954	The Mask	Writer	1 Episode
1954	Rheingold Theatre	Writer	1 Episode
1955	TV Reader's Digest	Writer	2 Episodes
1955	Sheena, Queen of the Jungle	Writer	1 Episode
1955–60	The Life and Legend of Wyatt Earp	Writer	4 Episodes
1956	The Ford Television Theatre	Writer	1 Episode
1956	Climax!	Writer	1 Episode
1956–59	Schlitz Playhouse	Writer, Producer	3 Episodes
1957	General Electric Theater	Writer	1 Episode
1957–62	Tales of Wells Fargo	Writer, Creator, Story Consultant	Multiple Episodes
1958	77 Sunset Strip	Writer	1 Episode
1958	Lawman	Writer	1 Episode
1958	The Texan	Writer	1 Episode
1959	Zane Grey Theatre	Writer	1 Episode
1959	Colt .45	Writer	1 Episode
1959–61	Shotgun Slade	Creator, Producer, Actor	Multiple Episodes
1965	Death Valley Days	Writer	1 Episode
1965	A Man Called Shenandoah	Writer	1 Episode

== Novels ==
=== Johnny Fletcher series ===
- The French Key aka Once Over Deadly (1940) (filmed in 1946)
- The Laughing Fox (1940)
- The Hungry Dog aka Die Like a Dog (1941)
- The Navy Colt (1941)
- The Talking Clock (1941)
- The Gift Horse aka Heir to Homicide (1942)
- The Mighty Blockhead aka The Corpse Moved Upstairs (1942)
- The Silver Tombstone aka The Silver Tombstone Mystery (1945)
- The Honest Dealer aka Double Dealer (1947)
- The Whispering Master (1947)
- The Scarlet Feather aka The Gamecock Murder (1948)
- The Leather Duke aka A Job of Murder (1949)
- The Limping Goose (1954)
- The Corpse Moved Upstairs (1964)
- Swing Low Swing Dead (1964)

=== Simon Lash series ===
- Simon Lash, Private Detective (1941) (filmed in 1946 as Accomplice)
- The Buffalo Box aka The Murder Box (1942)
- Murder '97 aka The Long Arm of Murder (1948)

=== Otis Beagle series ===
- Beagle Scented Murder aka Market for Murder (1946)
- The Lonesome Badger aka Mood for Murder (1954)

=== Other works ===
- The Silver Jackass (1941)
- The Last Doorbell aka Kiss the Boss Goodbye (1941)
- The Yellow Overcoat aka Fall Guy for a Killer (1942)
- The Last Doorbell (1946)
- The Fourth Letter (1947)
- The Lock and the Key aka Run, Thief, Run (1948)
- Broken Lance (1949)
- The Lone Gunhawk aka Smoky Road (1949)
- Death on Post No. 7 (1951)
- Fort Starvation (1953)
- Quantrell's Raiders (1953)
- Rebel Road aka Outlaw (1953)
- Bitter Sage (1954)
- Johnny Vengeance (1954)
- Ride to Hell (1955)
- Buffalo Grass aka The Big Land (1956)
- The Man From Missouri (1956)
- The Highway Man (1956)
- Billy the Kid (1957)
- Lonesome River (1957)
- Peace Marshal (1957)
- Town Tamer (1957)
- The Marshal (1958)
- The Bushwhackers (1959)
- Bugles West (1961)
- Twenty Plus Two (1961)
- Brothers of Silence (1962)
- Bridge of Sand (1963)
- The Greek Affair (1964)
- Little Hercules (1965)
- Brass Knuckles (1966)
- The Pulp Jungle (1967)
- This Gun Is Still (1967)
- The Twilight Man (1967)
- The Dawn Riders (1968)
- The Gold Gap (1968)
- The Curly Wolf (1969)
- The Etruscan Bull (1969)
- The Spanish Prisoner (1969)
- Wanted (1971)
- Bitter Sage and the Bushwhackers (1984)

== See also ==
- List of Ace western double titles
