= Frank Bonham =

American author

Frank Bonham (February 25, 1914 – December 16, 1988) was an author of Westerns and young adult novels. Bonham wrote 48 novels, as well as TV scripts.

Bonham was born in Los Angeles. He was a UCLA graduate.

Bonham was known for his works for young adults written in the 1960s, with tough, realistic urban settings, including The Nitty Gritty and Durango Street, as well as for his westerns. Several of his works have been published posthumously, many of which were drawn from his pulp magazine stories, originally published between 1941 and 1952. Durango Street was an ALA Notable Book.

Bonham died on his ranch in Arizona.

== Novels ==
- Lost Stage Valley (1948)
- Snaketrack (1951)
- Blood on the Land (1952)
- Night Raid (1954)
- The Feud at Spanish Ford (1954)
- Rawhide Guns (1955)
- Border Guns (1956)
- Defiance Mountain (1956)
- Hardrock (1958)
- Tough Country (1958)
- Last Stage West (1959)
- The Outcast of Crooked River (1959)
- Sound of Gunfire (1959)
- Burma Rifles: A story of Merrill's Marauders (1960)
- One for Sleep (1960)
- The Skin Game (1961)
- The Wild Breed (1962)
- War Beneath the Sea (1962)
- Trago (1962)
- By Her Own Hand (1963)
- Deepwater Challenge (1963)
- Honor Bound (1963)
- The Loud, Resounding Sea (1963)
- Cast a Long Shadow (1964)
- Logan's Choice (1964)
- Speedway Contender (1964)
- Durango Street (1965) ISBN 0-525-28950-X
- Mystery in Little Tokyo (1966)
- Mystery of the Red Tide (1966)
- The Ghost Front (1968)
- Mystery of the Fat Cat (1968)
- Nitty Gritty (1968)
- The Vagabundos (1969)
- Viva Chicano (1970)
- Chief (1971)
- Cool Cat (1972)
- The Friends of the Loony Lake Monster (1972)
- A Dream of Ghosts (1973)
- Golden Bees of Tulami (1974)
- The Missing Persons League (1976)
- Hey, Big Spender (1976)
- Bold Passage (1977)
- Rascals from Haskell's Gym (1977)
- Devilhorn (1978)
- The Forever Formula (1979)
- Break for the Border (1980)
- Fort Hogan (1980)
- Gimme an H, Gimme an E, Gimme an L, Gimme a P (1980)
- Premonitions (1984)
- The Eye of the Hunter (1989)
- Burn Him Out (1998)
- Furnace Flat (2000)
- Dakota Man: A Western Story (2007)

== Short story collections ==
- The Wild Breed (1955)
- The Best Western Stories of Frank Bonham (1989)
- One Ride Too Many: And Twelve Other Action-Packed Stories of the Wild West (1995)
- The Cañon of Maverick Brands: Western Stories (2001)
- Stage Trails West: Western Stories (2002)
- The Last Mustang: Western Stories (2003)
- Outcasts of Rebel Creek: A Western Quartet (2004)
- The Phantom Bandit: Western Stories (2005)
- High Iron: A Western Trio (2006)
- Devil's Graze: Western Stories (2008)
- The Dark Border: A Western Quartet (2009)
- Trouble at Temescal: A Western Duo (2010)
- Mission Creek: A Western Duo (2011)
- Dakota Man: Western Stories (2014)
