= Angeles Abbey Memorial Park =

Historic cemetery in Compton, California

- Location within the Los Angeles metropolitan area Location within California Location within the United States

Details
- Location: 1515 E Compton Blvd, Compton, CA 90221
- Coordinates: 33.8987°N 118.2062°W
- Owned by: Jean Sanders
- No. of graves: 37,748 (2001)
- Find a Grave: Angeles Abbey Memorial Park

Angeles Abbey Memorial Park, also known as the Angeles Abbey Cemetery, is a historic cemetery in Compton, California. It was built in 1923 and is known for its elaborate main building. It has over 35,000 plots filled and has barely any room for additional burials, meaning the cemetery's finances are declining. Vandalism is also prevalent. It has also been pictured as a Middle Eastern or South Asian locale in media such as the film The Untouchables and the TV series JAG.

== History ==
The cemetery was built in 1923 by George Clegg, a shipbuilder. He wanted to build a monument that would catch the eye easily, so he hired two architects to go to India and design a building for him. In the end, he found an empty field in Compton to make a crypt and announced that it could hold over 1,000 graves. Word spread quickly, and many people purchased plots. People of all religions were allowed to be buried in the cemetery. However, the cemetery was restricted to white people until 1970, when an African-American-owned mortuary company took charge. Jean Sanders bought the cemetery in 1992.

== Description ==
The main building takes influences from Indian, Byzantine, Moorish, Spanish, and high modernist architecture. The mausoleum, called the Abbey, was made from imported Italian marble. Inside, it housed a reproduction of The Angelus by Jean-François Millet in stained glass. The Abbey also contains a worship space with an organ, and the owners formerly held Sunday concerts in it. The organ does not work anymore.

== Notable interments ==
- Dorothy Dearing (1913–1965), actress (Up the River, Free, Blonde and 21, The Great Profile)
- Roland Drew (1900–1988), actor (Ramona, The Adventures of Tom Sawyer, Flash Gordon Conquers the Universe)
- Donald Shea (1933–1969), stuntman, actor, murder victim
- Stubby Stubblefield (1907–1935), racing driver and National Sprint Car Hall of Fame inductee
- Walter R. Tucker Jr. (1924–1990), politician and mayor of Compton
