= The Beast of Berlin =

Beast of Berlin may refer to:

- The Kaiser, the Beast of Berlin, a World War I propaganda film
- Hitler, Beast of Berlin, a World War II propaganda film
- Beasts of Berlin, members of the People's Defense Force in the fictional Marvel Universe
