= Holiday for Lovers =

1959 American comedy film

- Theatrical poster
- Directed by: Henry Levin
- Written by: Luther Davis
- Based on: Holiday for Lovers; 1957 play by Ronald Alexander
- Produced by: David Weisbart
- Starring: Clifton Webb; Jane Wyman; Jill St. John; Carol Lynley
- Cinematography: Charles G. Clarke
- Edited by: Stuart Gilmore
- Music by: Leigh Harline
- Production company: 20th Century-Fox
- Distributed by: 20th Century-Fox
- Release date: July 24, 1959
- Running time: 103 minutes
- Country: United States
- Language: English
- Budget: $1,970,000
- Box office: $1.1 million (est. US /Canada rentals)

Holiday for Lovers is a 1959 American DeLuxe CinemaScope comedy film directed by Henry Levin. Based on a 1957 play of the same title by Ronald Alexander, the film stars Clifton Webb, Jane Wyman, Jill St. John and Carol Lynley.

== Plot ==
Robert Dean is an old-fashioned psychologist who reluctantly allows his oldest daughter Meg to join a four-week tour in South America before returning to college. When he learns that she is planning on six more weeks in São Paulo, he travels to Brazil, accompanied by his wife Mary and younger daughter Betsy. Upon arriving, Robert is displeased with the changes to Meg's character, as she has begun habits that are shocking to Robert, such as smoking. He mistakenly believes that Meg is interested in her older mentor Eduardo Barroso, but she is engaged to be married to Barroso's son Carlos.

Meanwhile, Betsy is enjoying the attention that she is receiving from members of the U.S. Air Force and falls in love with Sgt. Paul Gattling. Back at the hotel, Carlos is reluctant to meet Meg's parents, fearing that they will disapprove of his bohemian lifestyle. Carlos makes a horrible impression on Robert, who tries to prohibit Meg from seeing him by booking a flight for the family to Rio de Janeiro and then on to Lima.

Feeling betrayed by her father, Meg calls Carlos to tell him goodbye, but he responds by accusing her of leading her father's life. Carlos and Eduardo follow her to Lima, where Carlos and Meg are reunited at a bullfight. Paul, who has also come to Lima as well, proposes to Betsy, but she rejects him, explaining she is not ready to marry. Later that night, Eduardo and Carlos announce that they are returning to São Paulo the following day. Robert reluctantly allows his daughter to accompany Carlos.

After bidding Meg farewell, Robert visits a bar, gets drunk and falls unconscious on the street, where he is mistaken for a member of a Spanish tour group. When he awakes, Robert finds himself on a plane bound for Madrid, and he is eventually dropped off in Trinidad. There, he phones Meg to offer his sincere blessing to marry Carlos, but she announces that she no longer loves Carlos.

Betsy asks Robert for permission to wed Paul, but her father declares that she is old enough to make her own decisions. She then becomes officially engaged to Paul.

== Cast ==
- Clifton Webb as Robert Dean
- Jane Wyman as Mrs. Mary Dean
- Jill St. John as Meg Dean
- Carol Lynley as Betsy Dean
- Paul Henreid as Eduardo Barroso
- Gary Crosby as Tech Sgt. Paul Gattling
- Nico Minardos as Carlos Barroso
- Wally Brown as Joe McDougal
- Henny Backus as Connie McDougal
- José Greco as Dancer
- Nora O'Mahoney as Mrs. Murphy
- Ingrid Goude as Receptionist

== Production ==
In March 1957, 20th Century-Fox bought the rights to the play, which had premiered a month earlier. Gene Tierney was initially set to star as Mrs. Mary Dean, but she withdrew at the last minute because of illness. In February 1959, the studio negotiated with Joan Fontaine to replace her, but Fontaine collapsed and Jane Wyman was finally assigned the role.

In August 1957, Suzy Parker was cast in a role, but she eventually withdrew. The role of Meg was originally offered in January 1959 to Diane Varsi, but she refused it and abandoned her contract with 20th Century-Fox only months later. Diane Baker was announced as her replacement, but the role eventually went to Jill St. John.

Background shots were filmed on location in early 1959. Most of the filming took place in São Paulo, Rio de Janeiro, Los Angeles International Airport, Lockheed Airport and Clover Field.

== Reception ==
In a contemporary review for The New York Times, critic Bosley Crowther called the character of Robert Dean a "disgustingly old-fashioned creature" and panned the film: "It is a thoroughly silly story, which is not in the least improved by the wishy-washy acting of everyone involved. ... [Y]ou have to endure a lot of nonsense from this synthetic family and the people they meet. Obviously, it would have been better if these Yanks had stayed at home."

The Pittsburgh Post-Gazette offered lukewarm praise for the film as being "light, frothy and splendidly photographed" but singled out Carol Lynley's performance: "[P]ert little Miss Carol Lynley easily steals the show. Her bright-eyed view of the world around her is utterly infectious. She walks, talks and otherwise behaves like the teenager she is, with a most refreshing lack of artificiality. What is even more remarkable, Miss Lynley manages all this despite the almost incredible obstacle presented by having to play opposite the hopelessly untalented Mr. Gary Crosby impersonating a sergeant."
