= Yesterday's Heroes =

- Directed by: Herbert I. Leeds
- Screenplay by: Irving Cummings Jr. William Conselman Jr.
- Based on: Yesterday's Heroes by William Brent
- Produced by: Sol M. Wurtzel
- Starring: Jean Rogers; Robert Sterling; Ted North; Kay Aldridge; Russell Gleason; Richard "Dick" Lane
- Cinematography: Charles G. Clarke
- Edited by: Alfred DeGaetano
- Production company: 20th Century Fox
- Distributed by: 20th Century Fox
- Release date: September 20, 1940
- Running time: 66 minutes
- Country: United States
- Language: English

Yesterday's Heroes is a 1940 American drama film directed by Herbert I. Leeds and written by Irving Cummings Jr. and William Conselman Jr.. The film stars Jean Rogers, Robert Sterling, Ted North, Kay Aldridge, Russell Gleason and Richard "Dick" Lane. The film was released on September 20, 1940, by 20th Century Fox.

== Cast ==
- Jean Rogers as Lee Kellogg
- Robert Sterling as Duke Wyman
- Ted North as Claude Hammond
- Kay Aldridge as Janice Mason
- Russell Gleason as Bill Garrett
- Richard "Dick" Lane as Cleats Slater
- Edmund MacDonald as Tex Jones
- George Irving as Dr. Stovall
- Emma Dunn as Aunt Winnie
- Harry Hayden as Mr. Kellogg
- Isabel Randolph as Mrs. Kellogg
- Pierre Watkin as Harvey Mason
- Frank Sully as Curly Walsh
- M. J. Frankovich as Announcer
- Don Forbes as Announcer
- Bert Roach as Dave
- Matt McHugh as Joe
- Truman Bradley as Judge
- Mary Field as Librarian
- George Meeker as Tony
