= The Great Flamarion =

1945 film by Anthony Mann

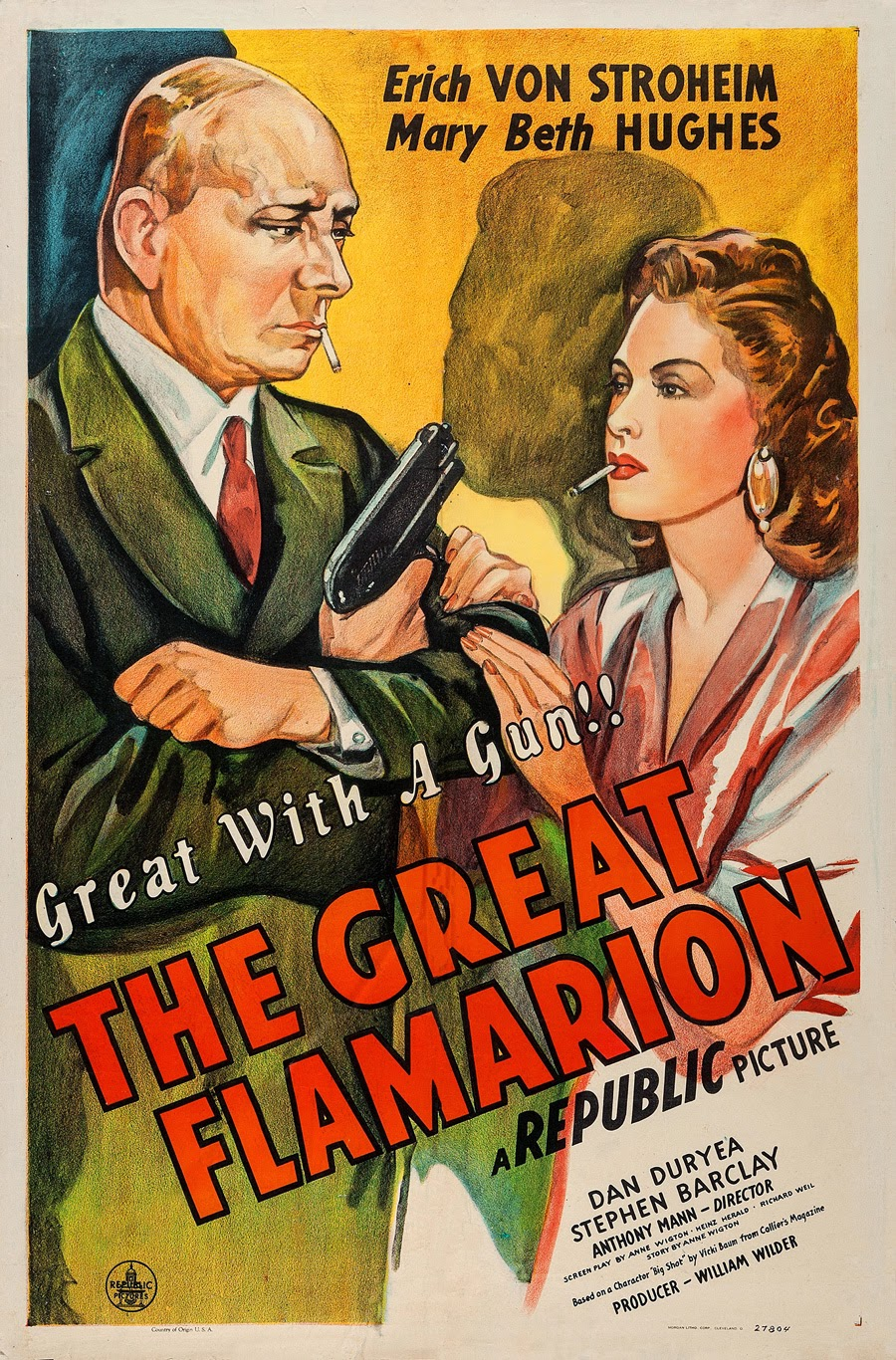
- Theatrical release poster
- Directed by: Anthony Mann
- Screenplay by: Heinz Herald; Richard Weil; Anne Wigton
- Based on: the short-story "Big Shot" by Vicki Baum; Anne Wigton
- Produced by: W. Lee Wilder
- Starring: Erich von Stroheim; Mary Beth Hughes; Dan Duryea
- Cinematography: James S. Brown Jr.
- Edited by: John F. Link, Sr.
- Music by: Alexander László
- Color process: Black and white
- Production company: W. Lee Wilder Productions
- Distributed by: Republic Pictures
- Release date: March 30, 1945
- Running time: 78 minutes
- Country: United States
- Language: English
- Budget: $150,000

The Great Flamarion (1945) by Anthony Mann

The Great Flamarion is a 1945 American film noir mystery film directed by Anthony Mann starring Erich von Stroheim and Mary Beth Hughes. The film, like many films noirs, is shot in flashback narrative. The film was produced by Republic Pictures.

This film is now in the public domain.

== Plot ==
Mary Beth Hughes as Connie Wallace

The film opens following a murder at a cabaret in Mexico City in 1936; a shot is heard, but the body of the female victim (Connie) has been strangled. The police take the woman's husband into custody, assuming he is the murderer. But Flamarion, who has been shot, is the murderer and he explains to a stagehand in flashback why he killed Connie. The Great Flamarion (Erich von Stroheim) is an arrogant, friendless, and misogynous marksman who displays his trick gunshot act in the vaudeville circuit. His show features a beautiful assistant, Connie (Mary Beth Hughes); her drunken husband Al (Dan Duryea) is Flamarion's other assistant. Flamarion falls in love with Connie, the movie's femme fatale, and is soon manipulated by her into killing her no good husband during one of their acts.

After Al's supposed accidental death, Connie convinces Flamarion to wait three months before the two can marry and flees back to Hibbing, Minnesota. Meanwhile, Connie has already begun a relationship with another performer, Eddie (Stephen Barclay). After she fails to show up at an arranged meeting place three months later, Flamarion goes into a downward spiral of drinking and gambling. Flamarion eventually finds Connie who informs him that she never loved him and used him to get rid of her husband.

== Cast ==
- Erich von Stroheim as The Great Flamarion
- Mary Beth Hughes as Connie Wallace
- Dan Duryea as Al Wallace
- Stephen Barclay as Eddie Wheeler
- Lester Allen as Tony
- Esther Howard as Cleo
- Michael Mark as Nightwatchman

== Production ==
Mann said "Von Stroheim, to say the least, was difficult. He was a personality, not really an actor. He looked well on film. But he was a great director. I’ll never forget one thing. He said: ‘Tony, do you want to be a great director? Photograph the whole of Great Flamarion through my monocle!’ I said: ‘That’s a helluvan idea, but I only have $150,000 and fourteen days.’ I said: ‘It might be a fascinating idea, but I’ll let you do it'... He drove me mad. He was a genius. I’m not a genius: I’m a worker. Geniuses sometimes end up very unhappy, without a penny. That’s what happened to Erich and Preston Sturges, too."

== See also ==
- Public domain film
- List of American films of 1945
- List of films in the public domain in the United States
