= The Bride Wore Crutches =

1941 film

- Directed by: Shepard Traube
- Screenplay by: Edward Verdier
- Story by: Edward Verdier; Alan Drady
- Produced by: Lucien Hubbard
- Starring: Lynne Roberts; Ted North; Edgar Kennedy; Robert Armstrong; Lionel Stander; Richard Lane
- Cinematography: Charles G. Clarke
- Edited by: Nick DeMaggio
- Music by: David Buttolph
- Production company: 20th Century Fox
- Distributed by: 20th Century Fox
- Release date: May 25, 1941
- Running time: 55 minutes
- Country: United States
- Language: English

The Bride Wore Crutches is a 1941 American comedy film directed by Shepard Traube and written by Edward Verdier. The film stars Lynne Roberts, Ted North, Edgar Kennedy, Robert Armstrong, Lionel Stander and Richard Lane. The film was released on May 25, 1941, by 20th Century Fox.

== Cast ==
- Lynne Roberts as Midge Lambert
- Ted North as Johnny 'Dizzy' Dixon
- Edgar Kennedy as Police Captain McGuire
- Robert Armstrong as Pete
- Lionel Stander as 'Flannel-Mouth' Moroni
- Richard Lane as Bill Daly
- Grant Mitchell as E.J. Randall
- Harry Tyler as Whispers
- Edmund MacDonald as Dick Williams
- Horace McMahon as Brains
- Anthony Caruso as Max
- Billy Mitchell as Harvey
