= Men on Her Mind =

1944 film by Wallace Fox

- Movie poster for the 1944 film Men On Her Mind
- Directed by: Wallace Fox
- Written by: Raymond L. Schrock
- Produced by: Arthur Alexander; Alfred Stern
- Starring: Mary Beth Hughes; Edward Norris; Ted North
- Cinematography: Robert E. Cline
- Edited by: Charles Henkel Jr.
- Production company: Alexander-Stern Productions
- Distributed by: Producers Releasing Corporation
- Release date: February 12, 1944
- Running time: 67 minutes
- Country: United States
- Language: English

Men on Her Mind is a 1944 musical drama film directed by Wallace Fox, produced by Alfred Stern. The screenplay was written by Raymond L. Schrock. The film stars Mary Beth Hughes, Edward Norris and Ted North.

== Plot ==
Lily Durrell (Mary Beth Hughes) is a radio and nightclub singer who has worked hard, and values her status as a star. Although she ponders her orphan 'rags-to-riches' past, she's also considering the idea of being involved with a romantic male companion. She tries to determine which of the 3 suitors would be best for her.

== Cast ==
- Mary Beth Hughes as Lily Durrell
- Edward Norris as Jeffrey Wingate
- Ted North as Jim Lacey
- Alan Edwards as Roland Palmer
- Luis Alberni as Alberti Verdi
- Kay Linaker as Eloise Palmer
- Claire Rochelle as Mayme Munson
- Lyle Latell as Big Joe Munroe
- Claire McDowell as Mayme Munson
- Eva Hamill as Gracie Tuttle
- Isabel La Mal as Miss Wiggins
- Lane Chandler as Frank Tuttle
