= The Mantrap =

1943 film by George Sherman

- Theatrical release poster
- Directed by: George Sherman
- Screenplay by: Curt Siodmak
- Produced by: George Sherman
- Starring: Henry Stephenson; Lloyd Corrigan; Joseph Allen; Dorothy Lovett; Edmund MacDonald; Alice Fleming
- Cinematography: William Bradford
- Edited by: Arthur Roberts
- Music by: Mort Glickman
- Production company: Republic Pictures
- Distributed by: Republic Pictures
- Release date: April 13, 1943
- Running time: 57 minutes
- Country: United States
- Language: English

The Mantrap is a 1943 American mystery film directed by George Sherman and written by Curt Siodmak. The film stars Henry Stephenson, Lloyd Corrigan, Joseph Allen, Dorothy Lovett, Edmund MacDonald and Alice Fleming. The film was released on April 13, 1943, by Republic Pictures.

== Plot ==
After being first at the scene of an accident, retired crime expert from Scotland Yard, Sir Humphrey Quilp, is given a “birthday present” of the fun of solving the crime by the Assistant District Attorney who is already sure of the identity of the murderer. Over the objections of his family, Quilp takes on the task using old fashioned logic and the knowledge of human nature instead of modern (1943) methods like fingerprints and microscopes. At the end of the day Quilp has revealed the killer, redeemed the innocent, and proved that he still has what it takes even if he is ready for a rest.

== Cast ==
- Henry Stephenson as Sir Humphrey Quilp
- Lloyd Corrigan as Anatol Duprez
- Joseph Allen as Eddie Regan
- Dorothy Lovett as Jane Mason
- Edmund MacDonald as Assistant District Attorney Knox
- Alice Fleming as Miss Mason
- Tom Stevenson as Robert Berwick
- Frederick Worlock as Patrick Berwick
- Jane Weeks as Miss Woolcott
