= The Devil's Henchman =

1949 film by Seymour Friedman

- Directed by: Seymour Friedman
- Written by: Eric Taylor
- Starring: Warner Baxter; Mary Beth Hughes
- Cinematography: Henry Freulich
- Edited by: Richard Fantl
- Distributed by: Columbia Pictures
- Release date: September 15, 1949
- Running time: 68 minutes
- Country: United States
- Language: English

The Devil's Henchman is a 1949 American crime drama film featuring Warner Baxter, Mary Beth Hughes, Mike Mazurki, and Regis Toomey. The film was written by Eric Taylor and directed by Seymour Friedman. It is a sequel to the first Jess Arno film, No Place for a Lady.

== Plot ==
The daytime insurance agent Jess Arno, moonlights as an undercover salvager at night. He sells the loot he finds to a seedy man named Tip Banning. Arno has long time suspected that Tip is in fact the leader of a gang of waterfront smugglers.

Later in the evening, down at the docks in Connie's waterfront tavern, Arno witnesses Tip meeting with Arno's beautiful companion Silky, accompanied by Bill Falls, third mate on a ship that is currently docked in the harbor. Arno hears Bill complain about the size of his cut, and that Silky offers to take him to the head of the organization. They leave the tavern together and Arno follows them. The party goes into a plumbing store, and when Arno steps in after them a while later, he finds Bill's cap on the floor. He is discovered by a giant of a man, the simple-minded Rhino, who works for the smuggler gang and stops him from investigating further.

Rhino takes a liking to Arno and they go back to Connie's tavern to drink and socialize. They get along so well that Rhono invites Arno to share a room with him. Connie, the owner of the tavern, tells Tip that night that she wants money to continue keeping quiet about his shady meetings with shipmates at her place. the next day Arno finds a body floating in the bay, and recognizes it as Bill. He calls the police and is questioned by detective Whalen about his finding, but he doesn't reveal that he had witnessed Bill's meeting with Tip two nights before. Tip realises that Arno has kept his mouth shut, and as a reward he offers Arno a job in his operation. Arno accepts the offer and later in the day, after escaping from the friendly Rhino, he meets with his government contact.

Arno and the contact investigates a box from Bill's warehouse and discovers that it is empty instead of containing furs as declared. They suspect that the furs have been removed at sea and never entered the dock, but they cannot determine how the stolen cargo was then delivered to shore to be apprehended by Tip. Arno returns to Connie's in the evening and a regular at the bar, a retired old sea captain, recognizes Arno. Arno, however, does not reveal any information about who he is. Later Arno slips Rhino a drink with knockout drops, and goes to investigate the plumber's shop. There he discovers a hidden trap door that leads down to the water.

The morning after, Tip tells Arno and Rhino that they will be doing a job that night. He warns them not to leave each other's sight. Through information from his regular contact, an organ grinder, Arno sends a message to the authorities to tell about what is going down, but Connie somehow intercepts it. Rhino and Arno meet with the boss of the smuggler gang, who is revealed to be the old sea captain Arno met the night before. All the men take a row boat out to the ship and steal a shipment of furs that have been packaged together. They bring the furs by boat in on the water under the plumbing store and pass the bales up through the trap door. The police are waiting in the store to arrest the gang, since Connie has tipped them off after getting Arno's message. Later, Connie tells Arno that she had been trying to capture the murderers of her husband, the captain of a freighter. All the time she suspected that Arno was no real criminal because "he danced too well for a dock rat."

== Cast ==
- Warner Baxter as Jess Arno
- Mary Beth Hughes as Silky
- Mike Mazurki as Rhino
- Regis Toomey as Tip Banning
- Peggy Converse as Connie
- Harry Shannon as Captain
- James Flavin as Sergeant Briggs
- Julian Rivero as Organ grinder
- Ken Christy as Detective Whalen
- William Forrest as Anderson
- Alan Bridge as Elmer Hood
- Paul Marion as Bill Falls
