= Billie (1965 film) =

1965 film by Don Weis

- Theatrical release poster
- Directed by: Don Weis
- Screenplay by: Ronald Alexander
- Based on: Time Out for Ginger by Ronald Alexander
- Produced by: Peter Lawford (executive)
- Starring: Patty Duke; Jim Backus; Jane Greer; Warren Berlinger; Billy De Wolfe; Dick Sargent
- Cinematography: John L. Russell
- Edited by: Adrienne Fazan
- Music by: Dominic Frontiere
- Distributed by: United Artists
- Release date: September 1, 1965
- Running time: 86 minutes
- Country: United States
- Language: English
- Box office: $1.5 million

Billie is a 1965 American musical comedy film directed by Don Weis. Based on the 1952 play Time Out for Ginger by Ronald Alexander, the film stars Patty Duke in the title role.

== Plot ==
Billie Carol is a 15-year-old girl who is not like every other teen. With her bobbed haircut, tomboyish behavior, and passion for track running, she distances herself from her fellow female classmates. Instead, she befriends Mike Benson, the newest school student who has recently joined the school athletic team. She gives him advice on how to run faster, and although he is initially reluctant to be taught a man's sport from a girl, he soon notices how gifted she is and is happy to listen to her. One day, the school coach Jones, sees her running on the track, and allows her to be on the team.

The town is shocked by this event, with most people feeling that it is inappropriate for a girl to be associated with athletics. Billie is unaffected by the gossips and criticism, though she feels sad over how much trouble she is causing her father, Howard. Howard is running for Mayor against Charlie Davis, and is harmed by the string of negative publicity. He at first sticks by his daughter's side, but later, as the elections near, attempts to make her quit the team. This upsets Billie, who has immediately been accepted as 'one of the guys' on the team. She reveals that she is able to run quickly due to listening to a fast beat in her head, and teaches the other guys how to do the same. During this process, she grows closer to Mike.

Meanwhile, Billie's older sister, Jean, has returned from college to spend time with her family. Jean admits to her sister that she has been married to a man, Bob Matthews, for seven months. Furthermore, she finds out that she is pregnant with his child. Howard is not aware of Jean's situation and encourages her to date other men, setting her up with Matt Bullitt. When the scandalous news about her pregnancy comes out, Howard's chances of becoming a mayor appear to dwindle. To save her father's career, Jean overcomes her fear and reveals that she has been married to Bob for over a year. Howard is at first shocked and slugs Bob, but later accepts and even embraces the news.

In the end, Billie wins the big match and becomes Mike's girlfriend. Afterward, he makes clear that he has no trouble with the fact that she is better at sports than he is. Howard wins the election, and becomes the town's mayor. His loving and caring wife, Agnes, reveals that she is pregnant at the post-election party.

== Cast ==
- Patty Duke as Billie Carol
- Jim Backus as Howard G. Carol
- Jane Greer as Agnes Carol
- Warren Berlinger as Mike Benson
- Billy De Wolfe as Mayor Charlie Davis
- Charles Lane as Coach Jones
- Dick Sargent as Matt Bullitt
- Susan Seaforth as Jean Matthews
- Ted Bessell as Robert "Bob" Matthews
- Richard Deacon as Principal Arnold Wilson
- Bobby Diamond as Eddie Davis
- Michael Fox as Ray Case, reporter
- Clive Clerk as Ted Chekas
- Harlan Warde as Doctor Hall
- Jean MacRae as Nurse Webb
- Donna McKechnie as dancer (uncredited)

== See also ==
- List of American films of 1965
- List of films about the sport of athletics
