= Ted North =

American actor (1916–1975)

Ted North Jr. (born Edward Ernest Steinel) (November 3, 1916 – November 22, 1975) was an American film actor of the 1940s, sometimes credited as Michael North.

The grandson of a stock theater operator and son of tent show operator Ted North, he was born in Topeka, Kansas, and graduated from the University of Kansas in 1939. North was studying law when he changed plans. A visit to Hollywood and a screen test arranged by Warner Baxter (a friend of North's father) led to his being cast in The Bride Wore Crutches. He said that he chose acting over being an attorney because "I saw so many young lawyers working for a dollar a day." North gained early acting experience in some of his father's stock productions. He appeared in several films including the films noir The Unsuspected and The Devil Thumbs a Ride (both 1947).

North's acting career was interrupted by three years' service in the Navy during World War II. After he returned to films, director Michael Curtiz had North's first name changed from Ted to Michael, saying, "Ted sounds too much like a cowboy."

North was married to actress Mary Beth Hughes from 1943 until their divorce in 1947. They had one son. He married again in 1952.

After North left acting, he became an agent for entertainers, including Red Skelton, Milburn Stone, and Amanda Blake.

North died in Florida, aged 59.

== Filmography ==
Year	Title	Role	Notes
1940	Young People	Eddie	Uncredited
1940	The Bride Wore Crutches	Johnny 'Dizzy' Dixon	
1940	Yesterday's Heroes	Claude Hammond	
1940	The Mark of Zorro	Student / Officer	Uncredited
1940	Street of Memories	Limby	Uncredited
1940	Chad Hanna	Fred Shepley	
1941	For Beauty's Sake	Bertram Erasmus Dillsome	
1941	Charlie Chan in Rio	Carlos Dantas / Clark Denton	
1942	Roxie Hart	Stuart Chapman	
1942	To the Shores of Tripoli	Bill Grady	Uncredited
1942	My Gal Sal	Sally's Friend	Uncredited
1942	Syncopation	Paul Porter	
1942	Manila Calling	Walter Jamison	
1942	Girl Trouble	George	
1942	Thunder Birds	Cadet Hackzell	
1942	Ox-Bow Incident	Joyce	
1943	Margin for Error	Saboteur	Uncredited
1943	Hello, Frisco, Hello	Dick Greenwood	Uncredited
1944	Men on Her Mind	Jim Lacey	
1947	The Devil Thumbs a Ride	Jimmy 'Fergie' Ferguson	
1947	The Unsuspected	Steven Francis Howard	(final film role)
