= Manila Calling =

1942 film by Herbert I. Leeds

- Directed by: Herbert I. Leeds
- Written by: John Larkin (story and screenplay)
- Produced by: Sol M. Wurtzel
- Starring: Lloyd Nolan; Carole Landis; Cornel Wilde; James Gleason
- Cinematography: Lucien N. Andriot
- Edited by: Alfred Day
- Music by: Cyril J. Mockridge; Emil Newman
- Distributed by: 20th Century Fox
- Release date: October 16, 1942
- Running time: 81 minutes
- Country: United States
- Language: English

Manila Calling is a 1942 American black-and-white World War II propaganda war film drama from 20th Century Fox, produced by Sol M. Wurtzel, directed by Herbert I. Leeds, that stars Lloyd Nolan, Carole Landis, Cornel Wilde, James Gleason, Lester Matthews, Louis Jean Heydt, and Ted North.

The film's storyline concerns American civil engineering forces struggling to establish an operational radio base following the invasion of the Philippines, with Japanese army forces resisting, and with the complication of the arrival in their midst of a beautiful nightclub singer fleeing the Japanese.

== Plot ==
After the Japanese army invades the Philippines, they capture the radio station owned by the American Radio Communications Company. The staff is forced to escape. and they head into the jungle, where they eventually meet up with a band of determined Filipino Scouts, known as Moros. Together, they cut their way through the dense jungle, finally making their way to the coast.

The ARCC staff, made up of radio technician Jeff Bailey and communications men Lucky Matthews and Tom O'Rourke, find an advance Japanese force occupying the plantation of an old friend. Working with the Moros as a guerrilla unit, they attack and kill the Japanese, seizing the plantation for its available radio transmitter.

Solidifying their defense positions, the group quickly discovers there is no food or water and that the plantation is now largely surrounded by elements of the Japanese army. A night club singer, Edna Fraser, also escaping from the Japanese, has made it safely to the plantation as well. Jeff is working to repair the damaged radio set in order to send messages of hope and courage to the conquered Filipinos. His hope is to rally the populace against Japanese enslavement and exploitation by joining the Philippine resistance.

The Japanese quickly become aware of this possibility and, using all means at their disposal, launch a determined land and air campaign to find and destroy the radio transmitter. Jeff is killed, and the plantation comes under heavy bombardment from the air.

As the bombs fall, Lucky is able to transmit a series of patriotic messages to the Filipino people under the repeated call sign "Manila Calling, Manila Calling". He demands continued resistance, at all costs, to the Japanese invaders from everyone hearing the broadcast. He encourages unwavering belief that all 130 million Americans are behind them and that they have not abandoned the islands and its people but are working even now toward their liberation. As the bombs continue to fall, destroying the plantation buildings one by one, Lucky states in no uncertain terms that General MacArthur will make good on his pledge to return and free the Philippines and its people. He then pleads, "America, send us the tanks and the guns, and we'll finish the job. Manila calling, Manila calling, Manila calling"...

== Cast ==
- Lloyd Nolan as Lucky Matthews
- Carole Landis as Edna Fraser
- Cornel Wilde as Jeff Bailey
- James Gleason as Tim O'Rourke
- Lester Matthews as Wayne Ralston
- Louis Jean Heydt as Harold Watson
- Ted North as Walter Jamison
- Martin Kosleck as Heller
- Ralph Byrd as Corbett
- Charles Tannen as Fillmore
- Elisha Cook Jr. as Gillman
- Harold Huber as Santoro
- Victor Sen Yung as Armando
- Uncredited actors: Rudy Robles as a Moro warrior,

Richard Loo, and Leonard Strong

== Production ==
According to United Press, "less than 12 hours" after the start of the attack on Pearl Harbor, John Larkin "was banging on the door of 20th Century-Fox with a scenario entitled 'Secret Agent in Japan.' He made one of the quickest sales in the history of the movies".

== Reception ==
The New York Times reviewer T. S. wrote:

From time to time Mr. Nolan does succeed in creating a credible hero, but for the most part the characters are hackneyed in writing and performance. As an action film of the more rudimentary kind, 'Manila Calling' is continuously noisy. But considering the subject and the times, that hardly seems enough.

== Home media ==
Manila Calling was released as a manufacture on demand DVD from 20th Century Fox Cinema Archives.
