= For Beauty's Sake =

1941 film

- Directed by: Shepard Traube
- Screenplay by: Walter Bullock; Ethel Hill; Wanda Tuchock
- Produced by: Darryl F. Zanuck
- Starring: Ned Sparks; Marjorie Weaver; Ted North; Joan Davis; Pierre Watkin; Lenita Lane
- Cinematography: Charles G. Clarke
- Edited by: Nick DeMaggio
- Music by: David Buttolph
- Production company: 20th Century Fox
- Distributed by: 20th Century Fox
- Release date: June 6, 1941
- Running time: 61 minutes
- Country: United States
- Language: English

For Beauty's Sake is a 1941 American comedy mystery film directed by Shepard Traube (1907–1983) and written by Walter Bullock, Ethel Hill and Wanda Tuchock. The film stars Ned Sparks, Marjorie Weaver, Ted North, Joan Davis, Pierre Watkin and Lenita Lane. The film was released on June 6, 1941, by 20th Century Fox.

== Plot ==
A young astronomy professor Bertram Erasmus Dillsome is forced by the terms of his late aunt's will to take over the running of her beauty salon in order to gain his inheritance. However, with the assistance of one of his students who has developed a crush on him, he manages to expose a gang of criminals operation out of the salon who may have murder his aunt.

== Cast ==
- Ned Sparks as Jonathan B. Sweet
- Marjorie Weaver as Dime Pringle
- Ted North as Bertram Erasmus Dillsome
- Joan Davis as Dottie Nickerson
- Pierre Watkin as Middlesex
- Lenita Lane as Dorothy Sawter
- Richard Lane as Mr. Jackman
- Lotus Long as Ann Kuo
- Glenn Hunter as Rodney Blynn
- Lois Wilson as Mrs. Lloyd Kennar
- John Ellis as Lloyd Kennar
- Olaf Hytten as Father McKinley
- Tully Marshall as Julius H. Pringle
- Phyllis Fraser as Julia
- Isabel Jewell as Amy Devore
- Nigel De Brulier as Brother
- Janet Beecher as Miss Merton
- Margaret Dumont as Mrs. Franklin Evans
- Helena Phillips Evans as Mrs. Jellico

== Bibliography ==
- Fetrow, Alan G. Feature Films, 1940-1949: a United States Filmography. McFarland, 1994.
