= Hitler – Beast of Berlin =

1939 film by Sam Newfield

- Film poster
- Directed by: Sam Newfield (as Sherman Scott)
- Written by: Fred Myton
- Produced by: Producers Releasing Corporation
- Starring: Roland Drew; Steffi Duna; Greta Granstedt; Alan Ladd
- Music by: David Chudnow
- Distributed by: Producers Releasing Corporation
- Release date: October 8, 1939
- Running time: 87 minutes
- Country: United States
- Language: English
- Budget: $100,000

Hitler – Beast of Berlin is a 1939 anti-Nazi propaganda film based on the novel Goose Step by Shepard Traube.

== Plot ==
A man and his wife lead a German anti-Nazi propaganda literature movement. After an inadvertent betrayal, the husband is confined to a concentration camp, from which he escapes to Switzerland.

== Cast ==
- Roland Drew as Hans Memling
- Steffi Duna as Elsa Memling
- Greta Granstedt as Anna Wahl
- Alan Ladd as Karl Bach
- Lucien Prival as Sachs
- Vernon Dent as Lustig
- John Ellis as Gustav Schultz
- George Rosener as Wunderlich
- Bodil Rosing as Frau Kohler
- Hans Heinrich von Twardowski as Storm Trooper Albert Stahlhelm
- Willy Kaufman as Herr Kohler
- Hans Joby as Hermann Lippert
- Frederick Giermann as Father Pommer
- Crane Whitley as Klee (as Clem Wilenchick)
- Henry Zynda as Erlich (as Henry von Zynda)

== Production ==
The film was the first production of Producers Releasing Corporation. It was recut and released as Beasts of Berlin the same year after having been banned in New York for its inflammatory content. It was also reissued in 1940 as Goose Step later in the decade as Hell's Devils.

Archival footage of Adolf Hitler is included.

== Reception ==
Film Daily described the film as a "well done film, amazingly well done in view of the actual amount of time and money spent in its production," while Variety judged it an "artistic failure, for its attacks on the Nazi regime merely scratch the surface without ever even hinting at the fundamental evils of Nazism."

James G. Stahlman, the president and publisher of the Nashville Banner, wrote an editorial in advance of the film's release, calling for it to be banned because it might inflame public emotions on the subject of Nazism. He argued that the evils of Hitler were already widely known and that there was no need to engage in what he described as "war propaganda".

== Release ==
The film was released in 1940 as Goose Step.

== See also ==
- Exploitation film
- Propaganda film
- Nazism and cinema
- History of propaganda films
- American propaganda during World War II
