= Last of the Wild Horses =

1948 film by Robert L. Lippert

- Theatrical release poster
- Directed by: Robert L. Lippert
- Screenplay by: Jack Harvey
- Produced by: Carl K. Hittleman
- Starring: James Ellison; Mary Beth Hughes; Jane Frazee
- Cinematography: Benjamin H. Kline
- Edited by: Paul Landres
- Music by: Albert Glasser
- Color process: Black and white
- Production company: Robert Lippert Productions
- Distributed by: Screen Guild Productions
- Release date: December 27, 1948
- Running time: 84 minutes
- Country: United States
- Language: English

Last of the Wild Horses is a 1948 American Western film directed by Robert L. Lippert and starring James Ellison, Mary Beth Hughes and Jane Frazee.

It was featured in episode 611 of Mystery Science Theater 3000.

== Plot ==
Duke Barnum, a rogue cowboy just outside of Jacksonville Oregon, appears to be planning to rob a stagecoach when he spots three men trying to catch a small horse thief. Not knowing the reason behind the chase and figuring the odds are unfair, he intervenes, stopping them in their tracks. After some banter, Duke tries to leave, but one of the three men, Hank, takes a shot at him. Duke shoots Hank in the arm, and upset at the attempted double cross, Duke forces the men off their horses, and makes them take off their boots, forcing them to walk back to their destination barefoot.

It turns out the three men work for the Double C Ranch, and Duke has to stop by there to get his horse reshod. The ranch is owned by Charlie Cooper, a man who is running other local small ranchers out of business, but worse than that, he is depleting the herds of wild horses all around. The sheriff happens to be passing by looking for a suspicious man who looked like he wanted to rob a stagecoach before mysteriously disappearing. The three barefoot men arrive and tell the sheriff about the trouble Duke has caused them too. It's all enough for the sheriff to bring Duke into town for questioning.

Fortunately for Duke, two of the townspeople, Remedy and Terry, come to Duke's aid and give false alibis until the sheriff agrees to let the two take Duke into their custody, where Duke is expected to be an additional hand on Remedy's ranch. Remedy is an older gentleman who claims to have a remedy for every ailment there is; he demonstrates when another hand, Curly, complains of a toothache, leading Remedy to go straight to a painful tooth extraction.

Meanwhile at the Double C Ranch, Charlie Cooper's daughter Jane finally convinces him to not be so aggressive in obtaining horses from the wild. So he reluctantly agrees to leave the herds alone for a full year. But, Riley, an unscrupulous individual who has been taking over more responsibility for the Double C Ranch over the years, has no intention with complying with this new imposition. In fact, he stirs up trouble by having the Double C Ranch hands round up more horses and instructs them to leave a Double C branding iron on the scene.

When the other cowboys in the city question Charlie Cooper about this, he is puzzled and gets angry that he is accused of breaking his word. Riley stirs the pot even more by going to the sheriff and demanding that all the Double C guys under his control be made into deputies, reminding the sheriff that Cooper at the Double C is the one that gave him his job. So the Double C guys become deputies with the law on their side and they raid not only horses from the wild, but horses from smaller local ranches as well. Charlie Cooper finally finds out what his ranch hands are doing and confronts them, but Riley is able to choke Charlie to death with Duke Barnham's bandana.

The sheriff arrests Duke for the murder and a sensational trial ensues that the entire town attends. Based on testimony from others, primarily Riley and his group of guys at the Double C Ranch, Duke is found guilty. But Terry gives him a gun and he's able to escape into hiding.

Later, when Remedy gets his mail from the post office, the postman asks if he can drop a letter off at the Double C Ranch along the way. Remedy reads it and it's a blackmail letter to Riley from one of his fellow ranch hands, Hank, saying he needs more money or else he'll reveal who really killed Charlie Cooper. Right then, Riley's horse approaches, and Remedy panics and drops the envelope from Hank. Riley recognizes the envelope on the ground and figures Remedy has a blackmail letter, so he shoots Remedy as Remedy is crossing a river on horseback, and then makes plans to deal with Hank.

Remedy survives the attack and delivers the wet letter to Duke at his hideout. Duke tells Terry to give the letter to the sheriff and immediately goes on a search to find Riley. They have a brutal fight in a hayloft, both take a nasty fall, and Duke wins as Riley is unconscious.

In the epilogue, Remedy reveals to Duke that he has been taking a correspondence course by mail while he has been in recovery. He giggles with glee when a young woman arrives. He says his correspondence course was in art, and the course sent him a model. The film closes with Curly saying, "I wonder how they got her in the mailbox?"

== Cast ==
- James Ellison as Duke Barnum
- Mary Beth Hughes as Terry Williams
- Jane Frazee as Jane Cooper
- Douglass Dumbrille as Charlie Cooper (as Douglas Dumbrille)
- James Millican as Sheriff Steve Harrison
- Reed Hadley as Riley Morgan
- Olin Howland as Remedy Williams (as Olin Howlin)
- William Haade as Henchman Rocky Rockford
- Grady Sutton as Curly, the cook
- Stanley Andrews as Rancher Pete Ferguson
- Rory Mallinson as Henchman Hawk Davis

== Production ==
The film was announced in June 1948.

Filming took place in Jacksonville, Oregon, USA, Medford, Oregon, USA and Rogue River Valley, Oregon, USA.

== Reception ==
The Los Angeles Times called it a "typical Western" with "some excellent outdoor vistas".
