= Gene Rodgers =

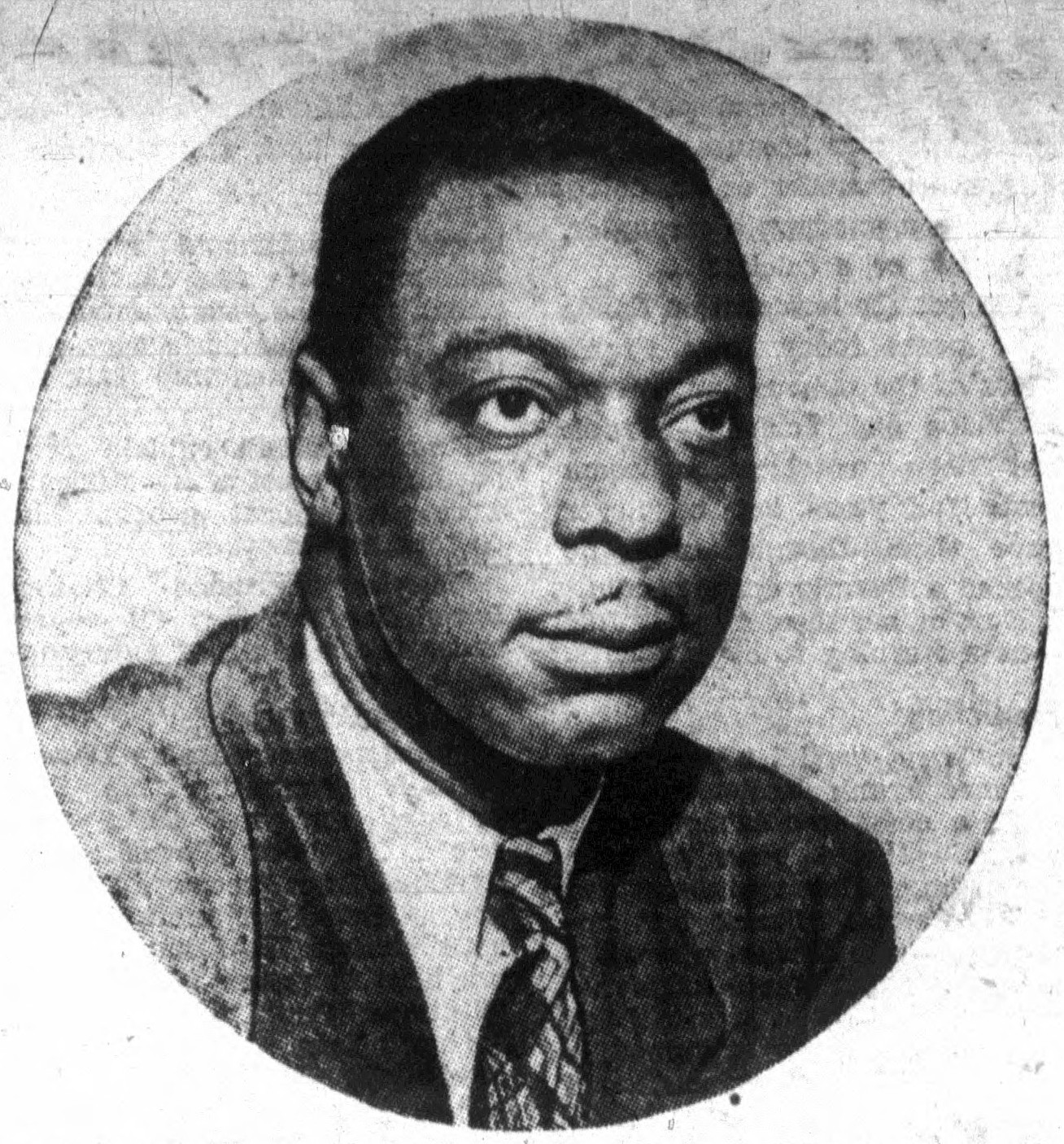

Background information
- Born: Eugene Ricardo Rodgers Jr, March 5, 1910; New York City, New York, U.S.
- Died: October 23, 1987 (aged 77) New York City, New York, U.S.
- Genre: Jazz
- Occupations: Musician, composer, arranger
- Instrument: Piano

Gene Rodgers (March 5, 1910 – October 23, 1987) was an American jazz pianist, composer, and arranger. He is best known for being the pianist on Coleman Hawkins' famous 1939 recording of "Body and Soul".

== Early life ==
Born Eugene Ricardo Rodgers Jr, the eldest child of Eugene Ricardo Rodgers Sr (a.k.a. Eugene Richard Rodgers), and his wife Blanche Bona Cabey (both of whom were born in what was then the Danish West Indies / Danish Antilles, later the American Virgin Islands), he was named for his father. Gene had three younger siblings, Mildred (1914), Rowland (1918), and Genevieve (1920).

== Later life and career ==
Rodgers worked professionally from the mid-1920s, and in the next few years made recordings with Clarence Williams and King Oliver in addition to playing with Chick Webb and Teddy Hill. He started his own variety show in the 1930s, doing tours of Australia and England; while in the latter in 1936 he recorded with Benny Carter.

Upon his return he played with Coleman Hawkins (1939–40), Zutty Singleton, and Erskine Hawkins (1943). He did work in Hollywood in the 1940s, including an appearance in the film Sensations of 1945 with Cab Calloway and Dorothy Donegan. After this he worked mainly in New York, leading a trio for many years. He played with the Harlem Blues and Jazz Band in 1981–82.

Rodgers appeared in the 1947 film Shoot to Kill, where he performed original compositions "Ballad of the Bayou" and "Rajah's Blues."

Rodgers recorded sparingly as a leader; he did two sides for Vocalion in 1936, four in a session for Joe Davis in 1945, and albums as a trio leader for EmArcy (1958), Black & Blue Records (1972), and 88 Up Right (1980).
