= David Street =

American singer

- Born: Patrick Devlin; December 13, 1917; Los Angeles, California, U.S.
- Died: September 3, 1971 (aged 53); Van Nuys, California, U.S.
- Occupations: Actor, singer
- Spouse(s): Mary Frances Wilhite (m. 1942; div. 194?) Lois Andrews (m. 1945; ann. 1946) Mary Beth Hughes (m. 1948; div. 1956) Sharon Lee (m. 1957; div. 1958) Debra Paget (m. 1958; ann. 1958) Elaine Perry (m. 1958; div. 19?)
- Children: 2

David Street (born Patrick Devlin; December 13, 1917 – September 3, 1971) was an American actor and singer in the 1940s and 1950s.

== Early years ==
Street was born Patrick Devlin in Los Angeles, California. While in high school, he formed a trio that sang in local theaters.

== Radio ==
Street was a singer on the network programs Meet Me at Parky's and The Sealtest Village Store.

In the 1940s, Street had two programs that were distributed via electrical transcription. The David Street Song Shop was produced by Louis G. Cowan, Inc., and David Street Sings was done by Sam Kerner Productions.

In 1948, he had a program, sponsored by Cardinet Candy, on a 21-station NBC West Coast network.

== Bands ==
Street played several instruments and worked with the orchestras of Hal Grayson, Al Lyons and Irving Aaronson in addition to having his own group. He also sang with Bob Crosby and Freddie Slack.

== Film ==
In 1942, Street signed a contract with Universal Studios. He moved to 20th Century Fox late in 1945.

Despite Street's having some roles in films, such as An Angel Comes to Brooklyn (1945), Laura Wagner wrote in Films of the Golden Age (Summer 2015), "[M]ovie success eluded him: He was good looking and had a very nice singing voice, but no real personality on camera."

== Recordings ==
In the 1940s, Street recorded for RCA Victor, and he "was considered a popular, up-and-coming crooner."

== Television ==
Street was featured in television programming produced by Philco in 1947, using what apparently was an early version of lip synching. An article in Variety magazine's September 10, 1947, issue reported that Street and The Modernaires guest starred on the Philco program, "simulating singing to off-screen recordings."

Street had his own programs on stations in New York and Cincinnati and twice on KLAC in Los Angeles. He was also seen on Melody, Inc., Make Me Sing It, Manhattan Penthouse, The Arthur Murray Party and Broadway Open House

== Personal life ==
Street married Mary Frances Wilhite in 1942. They had a son, David, and later divorced in Juarez, Mexico.

He then married actress Lois Andrews on October 27, 1945, a union that was ended by annulment in April 1946.

Street married actress Mary Beth Hughes April 28, 1948. They were divorced on January 23, 1956.

His marriage to actress Sharon Lee lasted only 26 days, from the December 14, 1957, wedding to the January 8, 1958, divorce.

Street's fifth wife was actress Debra Paget, whom he married January 14, 1958. An article in the May 1958 issue of Modern Screen magazine reported: "While Debra and David were honeymooning ... his first wife, Mary F. Payne, was complaining because he had fallen $4,845 behind in child support payments, and his fourth wife, Sharon Lee, was suing him for $3,000 she claimed she had lent David." His marriage with Paget was annulled April 10, 1958.

He married singer Elaine Perry in October 1958. They had a daughter in 1968.

== Death ==
Street died of cancer on September 3, 1971, at Valley Presbyterian Hospital in Van Nuys, California. He was 53 years old.
