= The Devil Thumbs a Ride =

1947 film by Felix E. Feist

- Theatrical release poster
- Directed by: Felix E. Feist
- Screenplay by: Felix E. Feist
- Based on: the novel by Robert C. DuSoe
- Produced by: Herman Schlom
- Starring: Lawrence Tierney; Ted North; Nan Leslie
- Cinematography: J. Roy Hunt
- Edited by: Robert Swink
- Music by: Paul Sawtell
- Production company: RKO Radio Pictures
- Distributed by: RKO Radio Pictures
- Release date: February 20, 1947; (U.S.)
- Running time: 62 minutes
- Country: United States
- Language: English

The Devil Thumbs a Ride is a 1947 American film noir directed by Felix E. Feist and featuring Lawrence Tierney, Ted North, Nan Leslie and Betty Lawford. It was produced and distributed by RKO Pictures.

== Plot ==
Steve Morgan (Tierney) is a charming sociopath who has just robbed and killed a cinema cashier. Seeking to escape, he hitches a ride to Los Angeles with unsuspecting Jimmy 'Fergie' Ferguson (North). Part way the pair stops at a gas station and picks up two women. Encountering a roadblock, Morgan persuades the party to spend the night at an unoccupied beach house. The police close in after Morgan killed one of the women.

== Cast ==
- Lawrence Tierney as Steve Morgan
- Ted North as Jimmy "Fergie" Ferguson
- Nan Leslie as Beulah Zorn, alias Carol Demming
- Betty Lawford as Agnes Smith
- Andrew Tombes as Joe Brayden, Night Watchman
- Harry Shannon as Detective Owens, San Diego Police
- Glen Vernon as Jack Kenny, Gas Station Attendant
- Marian Carr as Diane Ferguson
- William Gould as Police Capt. Martin, San Diego Police
- Josephine Whittell as Diane's mother
- Dick Elliott as Mack Wilkins, San Clemente Police (uncredited)
- Phil Warren as Pete, Roadblock Motorcycle Cop
- Robert Malcolm as Newport Deputy Sheriff Grover

== Reception ==
=== Critical response ===
When the film was released The New York Times film critic identified as BC (Bosley Crowther) dismissed the film: "The Devil Thumbs a Ride, which came to the Rialto yesterday, is a distinctly pick-up affair ... In the role of the thug Lawrence Tierney, who played Dillinger a couple of years back, behaves with the customary arrogance of all gunmen in cheap Hollywood films. It is pictures like this which give the movies a black eye and give us a pain in the neck."

In 2007, film critic Dennis Schwartz was also critical of the film: "Felix E. Feist (The Man Who Cheated Himself/Donovan's Brain/The Threat) directs and writes this ugly hitchhiker crime drama that has little entertainment value, the characters other than the main protagonist are too incredibly dull to ring true and it has no redeeming social value. The low-budget programmer is helped only by its noir look, fast-pace, the manic performance by Lawrence Tierney and the offbeat nature of its story ... Feist fills both the police car and the hitcher's car with noir characters, but it ends up as a ride to nowhere."

== See also ==
- Detour (1945)
- The Hitch-Hiker (1953)
- The Desperate Hours (1955)
