= The Desert Hawk (1950 film) =

1950 film by Frederick de Cordova

- Film poster by Reynold Brown
- Directed by: Frederick De Cordova
- Written by: Gerald Drayson Adams
- Story by: Jack Pollexfen; Aubrey Wisberg
- Produced by: Leonard Goldstein
- Starring: Yvonne De Carlo; Richard Greene
- Narrated by: Jeff Chandler
- Cinematography: Russell Metty
- Edited by: Otto Ludwig; Daniel A. Nathan
- Music by: Frank Skinner
- Production company: Universal Pictures
- Distributed by: Universal Pictures
- Release date: August 25, 1950 (New York)
- Running time: 77 minutes
- Country: United States
- Language: English

The Desert Hawk is a 1950 action adventure film directed by Frederick De Cordova starring Yvonne De Carlo and Richard Greene.

== Plot ==
In Arabia, an arranged marriage forces Princess Scheherazade to marry Prince Murad, a cruel ruler. A thief known as the Desert Hawk hears about the wedding and disguises himself as Murad in order to steal the wedding gifts. The next morning, the real Murad appears and, finding the dowry missing, orders his men to create the appearance that the Desert Hawk has massacred the locals.

When the princess learns that she has been tricked, she changes clothes with one of her maids, who is then mistaken for the princess and murdered. The servants, along with the disguised princess, are sold into slavery. The Desert Hawk purchases the princess at the slave market.

Murad, in a bid to consolidate his power, causes trouble by telling the princess's father that a neighbor has been aiding the Desert Hawk.

The princess' father entrusts Murad to avenge his daughter and murdered people, enabling him to pursue the Desert Hawk to try to acquire the princess and power for himself.

== Cast ==
- Yvonne De Carlo as Princess Scheherazade
- Richard Greene as Omar aka The Desert Hawk
- Jackie Gleason as Aladdin
- George Macready as Prince Murad
- Rock Hudson as Captain Ras
- Carl Esmond as Kibar
- Joe Besser as Prince Sinbad
- Anne P. Kramer as Yasmin
- Marc Lawrence as Samad
- Lois Andrews as Maznah
- Frank Puglia as Ahmed Bey
- Lucille Barkley as Undine
- Donald Randolph as Caliph
- Ian MacDonald as Yussef

== Production ==
Universal bought the story in January 1950 and the film was envisioned as a vehicle for Yvonne De Carlo. Douglas Fairbanks Jr was sought for the male leadm but the role was awarded to Richard Greene, returning to Hollywood after two years in Britain. Jackie Gleason signed to play a comic support role. Universal contract player Rock Hudson, who had recently earned notice for Winchester 73, was also cast.

Director Frederick de Cordova said that Greene was "everything a man or woman could want in a desert hero".

== Reception ==
In a contemporary review for The New York Times, critic Bosley Crowther wrote:

Another fantastic excursion into a never-never Oriental land full of beautiful harem maidens and luxuriously turbaned sheiks, Technicolored tents and green oases, teeming bazaars and swimming pools—but, most. of all, beautiful harem maidens with bare midriffs and soft, seductive smiles—has been made by Universal-International in its latest, "The Desert Hawk." But once that specific information has been reported dutifully, there is not a great deal else to mention. ... Sorry, that's all we can tell you about this latest gaudy frolic in the sand—and we rather suspect that the producers didn't intend that you should know a great deal more. Obviously, their preoccupation was with the beautiful, thinly clad girls. Enough of them—and there are plenty—and who cares about story or style? Somehow we have the feeling that we've seen this a hundred times before. It is as the moving finger which writes, and, having writ, moves on."
