= Time Out for Ginger =

1952 play by Ronald Alexander

- Original Playbill for Time Out for Ginger
- Written by: Ronald Alexander
- Characters: Virginia Carol; Howard Carol; Ginger Carol; Agnes Carol; Jeanie Carol; Joan Carol; Tommy; Lizzie; Eddie Davis; Ed Hoffman; Mr.Bob Wilson
- Genre: Comedy
- Setting: The living room of the Carol house

Premiere
- Date: November 26, 1952
- Place: United States
- Directed by: Shepard Traube (1907–1983)

Time Out for Ginger is a Broadway comedy written by Ronald Alexander, and directed by Shepard Traube (1907–1983), that ran 248 performances at the Lyceum Theatre from November 26, 1952, to June 27, 1953, before becoming hugely popular in regional theatres throughout the 1950s and early 1960s.

== Cast ==
- Melvyn Douglas as Howard Carol
- Nancy Malone as Ginger Carol
- Polly Rowles
- Lois Smith
- Conrad Janis
- Laura Pierpont
- Philip Loeb
- Larry Robinson

== Stage ==
The Broadway production starred Melvyn Douglas as Howard Carol, a middle-class husband and father of three girls, one of whom, Ginger (Nancy Malone), wants to try out for her school's football team. At first supportive of his daughter's goal, he begins to feel pressure from Ed Hoffman (Philip Loeb), the president of the bank where he works, and the community at large. The setting is the Carols' living room.

In 1954, several of the original cast members, including Melvyn Douglas, Nancy Malone and Philip Loeb, took the play to Chicago, where Steve McQueen replaced Broadway's Conrad Janis as Eddie Davis who was later replaced by Ralph E. Compton. Loeb had been blacklisted from television and radio several years earlier and the production was his last major role before he committed suicide on September 1, 1955.

In 1964, Liza Minnelli played Ginger at the Bucks County Playhouse.

== Television adaptations ==
On 6 October 1955, at 8:30 p.m., Jack Benny starred in a one-hour CBS television adaptation, broadcast for Shower of Stars, with Ruth Hussey, Gary Crosby, Edward Everett Horton, Mary Wickes, Larry Keating, John Hoyt, Ronnie Burns, Olive Sturgess, Carol Leigh, and Janet Parker as Ginger.

In 1960, Ziv Television Programs adapted a television pilot, Time Out for Ginger, as part of The Comedy Shop, an anthology of prospective series. Original playwright Alexander wrote the script for the pilot, which starred Candy Moore (in her first television role) as Ginger, with Roberta Shore as older sister Joan, Maggie Hayes as Agnes, former radio star Karl Swenson as Howard, and Margaret Hamilton as the Carols' maid, the pilot was not picked up as a regular series. Candy Moore went on to play one of Lucille Ball's two young children in The Lucy Show.

== Film adaptation ==
The play was adapted into the 1965 feature film, Billie, starring Patty Duke.
