= Shoot to Kill (1947 film) =

1947 film by William A. Berke

- Theatrical release poster
- Directed by: William Berke
- Screenplay by: Edwin V. Westrate
- Produced by: William Berke
- Starring: Robert Kent; Luana Walters; Edmund MacDonald
- Cinematography: Benjamin H. Kline
- Edited by: Arthur A. Brooks
- Music by: Darrell Calker; Gene Rodgers
- Production company: Robert L. Lippert Productions
- Distributed by: Screen Guild Productions
- Release date: March 15, 1947 (United States)
- Running time: 64 minutes
- Country: United States
- Language: English

Shoot to Kill, also known as Police Reporter, is a 1947 American film noir directed by William Berke and starring Robert Kent, Luana Walters, Edmund MacDonald and Russell Wade.

== Plot ==
Pursued by police cars, a fleeing motor vehicle crashes off the side of the road. Two of the occupants, Assistant DA Lawrence Dale and gangster Dixie Logan, are dead. The only survivor, Marian Langdon, then appears lying injured in bed, prompted by newspaper reporter Mitch Mitchell to tell the story of what happened.

In flashback, Marian is met by Mitchell outside Dale's office door and tells him she's there to ask Dale to hire her as his secretary. Mitchell, who knows Dale, ushers her in and convinces Dale to hire her. At a nightclub later she tells Mitchell she wanted the job because she saw Dale get Logan convicted, and that he's "going places," being next in line for ailing District Attorney John Forsythe's job. In brief courtroom scenes we see Dale orchestrate the conviction of Logan based on eyewitness testimony that Logan tells the court is perjured and paid for. Back at the nightclub, Gus Miller sits at another table and Mitchell points him out to Langdon as a powerful underworld figure. In montage we see Langdon dating first Mitchell, then Dale, and finally kissing Dale.

Gus Miller shows up in Dale's office and watches Langdon suspiciously, but leaves before Dale arrives. As Langdon's leaving for the day, janitor Charlie Gill arrives and starts servicing a hidden Dictaphone in Dale's office. Two thugs, who don't spot the Dictaphone, come in, take him away and push him down an elevator shaft. Later, in Dale's office, Gus Miller (along with fellow gangsters Mike Blake and Ed Carter) tells him Gill was killed because he was one of Logan's men, and that he needs to fire Langdon because she might know too much. After they leave, Dale is writing a letter of dismissal to Langdon when he discovers the hidden Dictaphone, and notes that its receiver is in the pocket of Langdon's coat, where Gill hurriedly left it when the thugs came for him.

Dixie Logan escapes from prison. After a period of indecision of what to do about Langdon, Dale proposes to her. As the couple leave the impromptu ceremony one of Miller's thugs takes a shot at Langdon but misses her. That night Langdon tells Dale she knows he married her only because "a wife can't testify against her husband," and that she knows he's in league with Miller. She then says she knows it was Miller who tried to kill her, that she's "made arrangements" in case she's killed that would be a problem for Dale, and that she and Dale are going to get rid of Miller and the other crooks he's working with, in order to give him a record that will get him elected as District Attorney. Dale doesn't like it but she tells him she has evidence against him in a "very safe place." Langdon then pointedly sleeps in a separate bedroom from Dale.

A crime wave erupts, putting pressure on Dale to act. Mitchell takes Langdon out to lunch one last time and they express feelings for each other. After Dale gets a phone call about the paid witnesses in Logan's trial (Forman and Collins), he calls Miller and tells him he needs to take care of them. Waiting in an apartment as Dale told them to, Forman and Collins hear a knock on the door, open it and find Dixie Logan pointing a gun at them. They tell him Miller paid them to testify against him, and they're waiting for the last of the money they were promised. Logan makes them write out confessions, then tells them to get lost. Mitchell, having followed Logan, then enters the apartment, and as they begin talking Forman and Collins are gunned down outside. Mitchell manages to get Logan's gun, and says he wants to take Logan in and clear his name with the confessions, which will make a great newspaper story. However, Logan says the confessions don't implicate Dale, and he doesn't want to give them to the cops until he has evidence against Dale. As they leave, Logan gets his gun and the confessions back and escapes.

In Dale's office, Langdon tells Dale she knows he was in on the killing of the witnesses. After she leaves, Mitchell enters and tells Dale about meeting Logan and the written confessions. Dale convinces Mitchell not to print the story yet so he can gather more evidence. Feeling cornered, Dale decides to resolve his problems by getting rid of Miller, Blake and Carter. He begins by going to them separately, convincing each to work with him against the other two, then charges them all with crimes, while promising each he'll get them free eventually. Having moved to resolve the crime wave, he's elected as the new DA.

During criminal proceedings and before Dale takes office, Blake is shot and killed on the witness stand (presumably by either Carter's or Miller's men). Dale tells Mitchell to go ahead and publish the story about the confessions, then calls Miller and tells him to have Mitchell killed because he's going to publish the story. Miller's thugs follow Mitchell, but instead of killing him they save him from shots fired from a passing car (by whom is again unclear, presumably either Blake's or Carter's men), and tell him they've been protecting him. The next day Miller calls Dale to tell him the men who saved Mitchell have been killed, that he believes Dale knows who might have done it, and suggests he knows he'd been double-crossed by Dale.

The night before Dale is to be sworn in as DA, Langdon tells him she's mailed her evidence against him, which also clears Logan, to his boss John Forsythe. Miller shows up with a gun and tells Dale he knows Dale was playing him off against Blake and Carter. Logan then appears, shoots Miller, says he's married to Langdon, and that her marriage with Dale was phony (so she hasn't committed bigamy). Langdon says she didn't know Logan was crooked when she married him, and that all along she's been working to clear him of the crime he was wrongly convicted of. Logan tells Dale he wants him to become DA and protect him as he did Miller, but Dale tells him that because Langdon mailed the evidence to Forsythe he won't become DA. Logan slaps Langdon for doing this, and she tells him she's sorry she cleared him of the wrongful conviction because she now knows he's rotten. The police chief calls Dale to tell him Logan is coming for him, and that the police are on their way. Dale and Logan agree to work together, and also agree that Langdon needs to be killed. They pull her into Logan's car, which is spotted by the police, flee and end up in the crash that started the film.

Back at Langdon's bedside, DA Forsythe enters with the evidence she sent him, telling Mitchell it'll make a great story. Mitchell says he won't publish it, which Forsythe says he thought he'd say. Mitchell kisses Langdon and tells her that everything is going to be all right.

== Cast ==
- Russell Wade as investigative reporter George "Mitch" Mitchell
- Luana Walters (billed as Susan Walters) as Marian Langdon - Logan's wife
- Edmund MacDonald as the corrupt Asst. DA, Lawrence Dale
- Robert Kent (billed as Douglas Blackley) as former gangster "Dixie" Logan aka Judge Joel Conroy
- Vince Barnett as Charlie Gill - Janitor
- Nestor Paiva as Gus Miller - Gangster
- Charles Trowbridge as District Attorney John Forsythe
- Harry Brown as Jim Forman - Paid witness
- Ted Hecht as Al Collins - Paid witness
- Harry Cheshire as Mike Blake - Gangster
- Robert Riordan as Ed Carter
- Joe Devlin as Smokey, Man Tailing Dale
- Eddie Foster as Bingo, Man Tailing Dale
- Frank O'Connor as Deputy Clem Sparks
- Sammy Stein as Blackie
- Gene Rodgers as Piano Player

== Reception ==
The New York Times panned the film, writing: "Screeching tires and the barking of guns are the chief sound effects in Shoot to Kill, an all-around amateurish job of movie-making which found its way into the Rialto yesterday. An outfit called Screen Guild Productions is responsible for this dilly about an assistant district attorney who double-crosses all his racketeer pals and winds up his career on a slab in the morgue. William Berke as the director-producer did not get anything resembling a performance, much less characterization, out of his players, chief of whom are Russell Wade, Susan Walters, Edmund MacDonald and Douglas Blackley."

== Soundtrack ==
Gene Rodgers appears on screen performing two of his own compositions: "Ballad of the Bayou" and "Rajah's Blues." The film's score was provided by Darrell Calker.
