= Holiday for Lovers (play) =

1957 American play

- Written by: Ronald Alexander
- Characters: Mary Dean; Robert Dean; Betsy Dean; Connie McDougal; Joe McDougal; Maid; Margaret Dean; Paul Gattalin; Henri Berchat
- Original language: English
- Genre: Comedy

Premiere
- Date premiered: February 14, 1957
- Place premiered: Morosco Theatre, Manhattan, New York City

Holiday for Lovers is a 1957 play written by Ronald Alexander. It opened on Broadway on February 14, 1957, and closed after 100 performances on May 11, 1957. It was later adapted into the 1959 film Holiday for Lovers.

== Settings ==
The show takes place in hotel rooms in New York, Paris, Seville, and Rome.

== Productions ==
The show opened on Broadway at the Morosco Theatre on February 14, 1957, produced and directed by Shepard Traube (1907–1983), set and lighting design John Robert Lloyd, and costume design by Helene Pons. The cast included Carmen Matthews (Mary Dean), Don Ameche (Robert Dean), Sandra Church (Betsy Dean), Audrey Christie (Connie McDougal), George Mathews (Joe McDougal), Denise Dorin (Maid), Ann Flood (Margaret Dean), Thomas A. Carlin (Paul Gattalin), and Rene Paul (Henri Berchat). Understudies included Ludie Claire (Mary Dean and Connie McDougal), Robert Drew (Paul Gattalin), Alan Furlan (Robert Dean, Joe McDougal, & Henri Berchat), and Emily Horsley (Betsy Dean & Margaret Dean).
