= Lois Andrews =

American actress

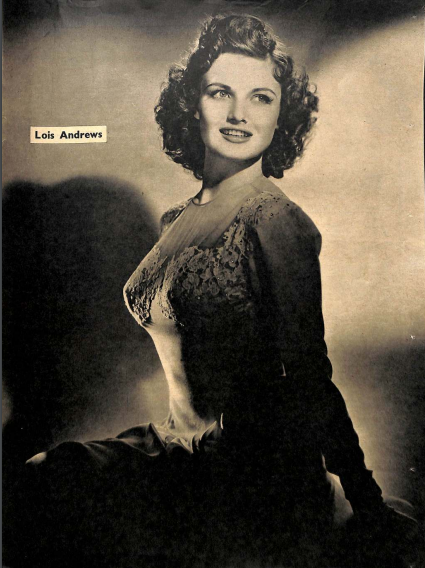
- Andrews in 1943
- Born: Lorraine Gourley; March 24, 1924; Huntington Park, California. U.S.
- Died: April 5, 1968 (aged 44); Los Angeles, California, U.S.
- Occupation: Actress
- Years active: 1943–1951
- Spouses: George Jessel (m. 1940; div. 1943) David Street (m. 1945; ann. 1946) Steve Brodie (m. 1946; div. 1949) Ernest Brunner (m. 1952)
- Children: 1

Lois Andrews (born Lorraine Gourley; March 24, 1924 – April 5, 1968) was an American actress who played in films during the 1940s and early 1950s.

She is perhaps best known for her first role in 1943 as the comic strip character Dixie Dugan in the Twentieth Century Fox film of the same name. Her husband, George Jessel, produced a number of films in which she had minor roles, including The Desert Hawk (1950), and Meet Me After the Show (1951).

== Personal life ==
Andrews was born on March 24, 1924, in Huntington Park, California, a working-class suburb of Los Angeles. Andrews married four times. While still in her teens, Andrews was married to Jessel from 1940 to 1943. They wed when she was 16, and they had a daughter, Jerilyn.

Her second marriage (October 27, 1945), to actor-singer David Street, was annulled in April 1946.

She was married to the actor Steve Brodie from October 14, 1946, until 1949. (Two newspaper articles say that she divorced Brodie March 3, 1949.)

Andrews married musician and actor Ernest Brunner in December 1952.

== Death ==
Andrews died of lung cancer at the age of 44.

== Filmography ==
- Dixie Dugan (1943) as Dixie Dugan
- Roger Touhy, Gangster (1944) as Daisy
- Western Heritage (1948) as Cleo Raymond
- Rustlers (1949) as Trixie Fontaine
- The Desert Hawk (1950) as Maznah
- Meet Me After the Show (1951) as Gloria Carstairs
