= I Accuse My Parents =

1944 film by Sam Newfield

- One-sheet for I Accuse My Parents
- Directed by: Sam Newfield
- Screenplay by: Harry L. Fraser; Marjorie Dudley
- Story by: Arthur Caesar
- Produced by: Max Alexander
- Starring: Robert Lowell; Mary Beth Hughes; George Meeker; John Miljan; Vivienne Osborne
- Cinematography: Robert E. Cline
- Edited by: Charles Henkel Jr.
- Music by: Songs: Ray Evans; Jay Livingston; Score: Lee Zahler
- Distributed by: Producers Releasing Corporation
- Release dates: November 4, 1944 (premiere); October 27, 1945 (general release)
- Running time: 68 minutes
- Country: United States
- Language: English

I Accuse My Parents is a 1944 American exploitation film dealing with juvenile delinquency. Produced by PRC, the film was used to teach morals, specifically that parents should take an interest in their children's lives, as well as the consequences (both emotionally and psychologically) of child neglect. It premiered on November 4, 1944 and was released generally on October 27, 1945.

== Plot ==
Mild-mannered teen James "Jimmy" Wilson (Robert Lowell) appears before a judge on charges of manslaughter. When asked to speak in his own defense, he pauses, and reflects to say; "I accuse my parents" for not giving him the home life he should have had.

The film then flashes back to a day in high school, when Jim was given an award for an essay describing the ideal home he supposedly has. Eager to tell his parents, he goes home to a house full of empty liquor bottles, and parents distracted by arguing with each other. Jimmy is embarrassed when his mother (Vivienne Osbourne) shows up drunk to the graduation planning committee. Later, his father (John Miljan) gives him money instead of celebrating his birthday with him.

Jim gets a job selling shoes after school and meets torch singer Kitty Reed (Mary Beth Hughes). He delivers a pair of shoes to her house and then meets her later at the nightclub where she works. The two begin dating, Jim unaware that Kitty is also the moll of gangster Charles Blake (George Meeker), who specialises in fencing stolen jewellery. Blake identifies Jimmy as sufficiently gullible and recruits him to deliver packages and messages after work and school. Jim gets paid highly for his errands, so he never questions what exactly he is delivering.

Charles forces Kitty to break up with Jimmy after he realizes their relationship is becoming serious. Shortly afterward, Jim drives two of Charlie's henchmen to a late-night "errand," which turns out to be a robbery in which a night watchman is shot. Realizing what he's got himself involved with, Jimmy turns to his father, who rebuffs him. Jimmy confronts Blake himself, but Blake threatens to kill him if he does not continue working for him. After the police identify Jimmy as the driver of the getaway car, Blake sends his men to kill Jimmy, but the execution is interrupted when two passersby happen upon the scene, causing the men to flee and leave behind a beaten Jimmy.

Fearing for his life, Jimmy packs a suitcase and spends an indeterminate amount of time hitchhiking and train-hopping. He ends up in a small town where he attempts to rob a diner, but the kindly owner, Al (George Lloyd), recognises Jimmy as a good boy in a bad situation, and offers him safe harbor and a job, as long as he agrees to give up crime and start going to church. After a period of living and working for Al, Jimmy's life straightens up and he confesses to his crimes. Al agrees to accompany Jimmy back home to turn himself in.

Back in Jimmy's hometown, Al takes him to confront Kitty, who confesses that she was forced to break up with him. Jimmy then goes to confront Blake one more time, in the hopes that Blake will also turn himself in to help clear Jimmy's name. Blake refuses and instead pulls a gun on Jimmy; Jimmy attempts to wrestle the gun away, accidentally shooting and killing Blake in the process. The police, alerted by Al, storm Blake's hideout and arrest his men, along with Jimmy.

Back in the present, the judge, understanding why Jimmy accuses his parents, acquits Jimmy of manslaughter. However, the judge also finds him guilty on charges of possession of stolen property, gives him a five-year suspended sentence and two years' probation and remands him to the custody of his parents until he is twenty-one. The judge then addresses Jimmy's parents (and the camera), warning that any young man could suffer the same fate as Jimmy if left to neglectful parents.

The film concludes with a title card informing the audience that the production company is paying all costs to send the film overseas to entertain troops fighting World War II.

== Cast ==
- Robert Lowell as James "Jimmy" Wilson
- Mary Beth Hughes as Kitty Reed
- John Miljan as Dan Wilson
- Vivienne Osborne as Mrs. Wilson
- George Meeker as Charles Blake
- Edward Earle as Judge
- George Lloyd as Al Frazier
- Patricia Knox as Vera Moore
- Florence Johnson as Shirley Clark
- Richard Bartell as Joe Holden

== Mystery Science Theater 3000 ==
I Accuse My Parents was featured in episode #507 of Mystery Science Theater 3000 in 1993 along with the Encyclopædia Britannica short film The Truck Farmer.

== Home media ==
- The Mystery Science Theater 3000 version of the film was released by Rhino Home Video in 2002.
- Alpha Video released the film on Region 1 DVD in 2004.

== See also ==
- List of American films of 1944
