= Blondie's Anniversary =

1947 film

- Film poster
- Directed by: Abby Berlin
- Written by: Jack Henley
- Based on: comic strip Blondie by Chic Young
- Starring: Penny Singleton; Arthur Lake; Larry Simms
- Cinematography: Vincent J. Farrar
- Edited by: Al Clark
- Music by: Mischa Bakaleinikoff; Paul J. Smith; Clarence Wheeler
- Production company: Columbia Pictures
- Distributed by: Columbia Pictures
- Release date: December 18, 1947
- Running time: 67 minutes
- Country: United States
- Language: English

Blondie's Anniversary is a 1947 American comedy film directed by Abby Berlin and starring Penny Singleton, Arthur Lake, and Larry Simms. It is the 22nd film in the series of 28 Blondie films.

== Plot ==
Dagwood's boss George Radcliffe wants to make a good impression on the bank president's secretary, so he buys an expensive watch for her. He asks Dagwood to pick it up at the jeweler's shop and deliver it the next morning. Blondie sees the watch, assumes that it's an anniversary gift, and keeps it for herself. Dagwood, needing to keep peace with Blondie and save face with the boss, buys a cheap knockoff of the watch and delivers it instead. When Mr. Radcliffe learns of the substitution, he fires Dagwood.

A loan shark offers to lend Dagwood some money, to relieve Dagwood's financial burden. Two crooked contractors hire Dagwood to work on their latest project, the building of a new hospital; Dagwood had already drafted the plans for Radcliffe. The contractors use Dagwood's blueprints, but they don't tell him that they're cheating on the raw materials, mixing sand into the concrete and using an inferior grade of lumber. The loan shark, the contractors, the bank president, and Radcliffe all converge on Dagwood when contracts must be signed. Blondie steps in to clear the air and untangle the mess.

== Cast ==
- Penny Singleton as Blondie
- Arthur Lake as Dagwood
- Larry Simms as Baby Dumpling
- Marjorie Kent as Cookie
- Daisy as Daisy the Dog
- Adele Jergens as Gloria Stafford
- Jerome Cowan as George Radcliffe
- Grant Mitchell as Samuel Breckenbridge
- William Frawley as Sharkey
- Edmund MacDonald as Bob Burley
- Fred F. Sears as Bert Dalton
- Jack Rice as Ollie Shaw
- Alyn Lockwood as Mary
- Frank Wilcox as Carter

== Production ==
Blondie's Anniversary was filmed in 15 days.

== Reception ==
Showmen's Trade Review raved, "This excellent release in the Blondie series is full of laughs and action from start to finish. Penny Singleton and Arthur Lake play their lines for the utmost in audience response. Adele Jergens is splendid as the blonde menace and Jerome Cowan runs the principals a close second for laughs as Dagwood's domineering boss. Abby Berlin's direction keeps the pace fast."

Exhibitors were generally pleased as well. "This is the best Blondie for a long while." (Jerome, Arizona); "This is a very good comedy which pleased, good business. These Blondie comedies outdraw some of the major features and are very good for a small town." (Dewey, Oklahoma). "We always find Blondie has popular appeal on weekends. It was well received with satisfactory box-office." (Tilbury, Ontario).
