= Roland Drew =

American actor (1900–1988)

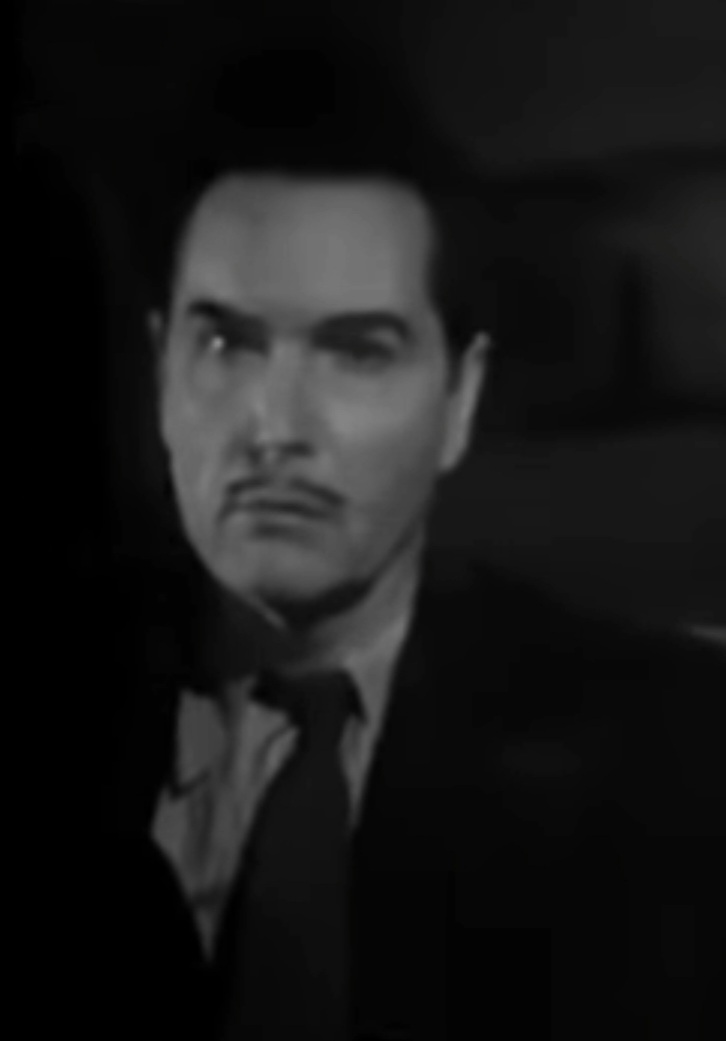
- Drew in Lady Gangster (1942)
- Born: William Goss; August 4, 1900; Elmhurst, New York City, U.S.
- Died: March 17, 1988 (aged 87); Santa Monica, California, U.S.
- Resting place: Angeles Abbey Memorial Park, Compton, California
- Occupations: Actor; dressmaker
- Years active: 1926–1945
- Spouse: Dorothy Dearing (m. 1946; died 1965)
- Children: 1

Roland Drew (born Walter Goss; August 4, 1900 – March 17, 1988) was an American actor.

== Biography ==
Born in 1900 in New York City, Drew made his first film in 1926 and continued to work until the 1940s. Noted primarily as Dolores del Río's leading man in Ramona in 1928, another of his prominent film roles was as Dr. Robinson in The Adventures of Tom Sawyer a decade later. His other appearances include From Nine to Nine, Hitler, Beast of Berlin, Bermuda Mystery, and Two O'Clock Courage. He also gained fame as Prince Barin in the 1940 film serial Flash Gordon Conquers the Universe.

On Broadway, Drew portrayed Jackson Macy in Shooting Star (1933) and Lieutenant Roget in Paths of Glory (1935).

He retired from acting and became a dressmaker.

He enlisted as a private in the U.S. Army in September 1942 during World War II.

Drew married actress Dorothy Dearing in 1946. On March 17, 1988, he died at his home, aged 87. He was interred with his wife in Angeles Abbey Memorial Park, Compton, California.

== Filmography ==
Year	Title	Role	Notes
1926	Fascinating Youth	Randy Furness	
1926	Fine Manners	Buddy Murphy	
1927	Fireman, Save My Child	Walter	
1928	Ramona	Felipe	
1928	Lady Raffles	Warren Blake	
1929	Broadway Fever	Eric Byron	
1929	Evangeline	Gabriel	
1929	The Racketeer	Tony Vaughan	
1930	The Love Trader	Tonia	
1930	Ex-Flame	Umberto	
1935	The Seminoles		
1936	From Nine to Nine	Inspector Vernon	
1937	Thunder in the City	Frank	Uncredited
1937	The Great Gambini	Stephen Danby	
1937	She Asked for It	Randolph Stettin	
1937	Some Blondes Are Dangerous	Paul Lewis	
1938	The Goldwyn Follies	Roland, Igor in 'Forgotten Dance'	Uncredited
1938	The Adventures of Tom Sawyer	Dr. Robinson	Uncredited
1938	The Lady in the Morgue	Sam Taylor	
1938	The Last Warning	Paul Gomez	
1939	Mystery of the White Room	Dr. Norman Kennedy	
1939	Unmarried	Sportsman	Uncredited
1939	Hitler – Beast of Berlin	Hans Memling	
1939	The Invisible Killer	Lt. Jerry Brown	
1940	Flash Gordon Conquers the Universe	Prince Barin	Serial
1940	The Saint Takes Over	Albert 'Rocky' Weldon	
1940	Mystery Sea Raider	Navigating Officer	Uncredited
1940	Wildcat Bus	Davis	
1941	Underground	Gestapo	
1941	Sergeant York	Officer	Uncredited
1941	Bullets for O'Hara	Bradford	
1941	Manpower	Citizen Reporting Power Outage	Uncredited
1941	The Smiling Ghost	Uncle Hilton Fairchild	
1941	Law of the Tropics	Hotel Clerk	
1941	Blues in the Night	Gambler Letting Kay Throw Dice	Uncredited
1941	The Body Disappears		(scenes deleted)
1941	Steel Against the Sky	Weather Man	Uncredited
1941	Dangerously They Live	Dr. Murdock	
1941	You're in the Army Now	Captain	Uncredited
1942	The Man Who Came to Dinner	Reporter	Uncredited
1942	All Through the Night	Reporter	Uncredited
1942	Captains of the Clouds	Officer	
1942	Bullet Scars	Jake	
1942	Lady Gangster	Carey Wells	
1942	I Was Framed	Dist. Atty. Gordon Locke	
1942	Murder in the Big House	'Mile-Away' Gordon	
1942	Larceny, Inc.	Dan – McCarthy's Associate	Uncredited
1942	Spy Ship	Nils Thorson	
1942	The Big Shot	Faye	
1942	Secret Enemies	Fred Blosser – Chauffeur	
1942	Across the Pacific	Capt. Harkness	
1942	The Hidden Hand	Walter Channing	
1943	The Hard Way	Roland	Uncredited
1943	Princess O'Rourke	First Airline Dispatcher	Uncredited
1943	The Desert Song	French Officer	Uncredited
1944	Bermuda Mystery	John Best	
1944	The Adventures of Mark Twain	Editor	Uncredited
1944	The Contender	Kip Morgan	
1944	Silent Partner	Harry Keating	
1945	Two O'Clock Courage	Steve Maitland	(final film role)
