= Shepard Traube =

Theatre director

Shepard Traube (1907–1983) was a theatrical producer and director who is best known for his Broadway production of Patrick Hamilton's Angel Street (Gas Light), for which he won the 1941 New York Drama Critics' Circle award for best director. The play ran for 1,295 performances, one of the longest-running nonmusical productions on record, and was adapted into George Cukor's Oscar-winning 1944 film Gaslight, from which the term "gaslighting" is derived.

== Career ==
His other Broadway successes include Sidney Kingsley's The Patriots, which won the New York Drama Critics' Circle Award for best play in 1943; Aldous Huxley's The Giaconda Smile, with Basil Rathbone in 1950; Ronald Alexander's Time Out for Ginger, with Melvyn Douglas in 1952; and Alexander's Holiday for Lovers, with Don Ameche in 1957.

Traube also directed a number of films during a brief contract with 20th Century-Fox, including the comedy, The Bride Wore Crutches, and the drama, Street of Memories, both in 1940 starring Lynne Roberts; and the 1941 mystery-comedy, For Beauty's Sake.

In later life, Traube taught at Yale, New York University and Carnegie-Mellon University. He was instrumental in the founding of the Society of Stage Directors and Choreographers, and was elected its first president in 1959.
