= Dorothy Dearing =

American actress (1913–1965)

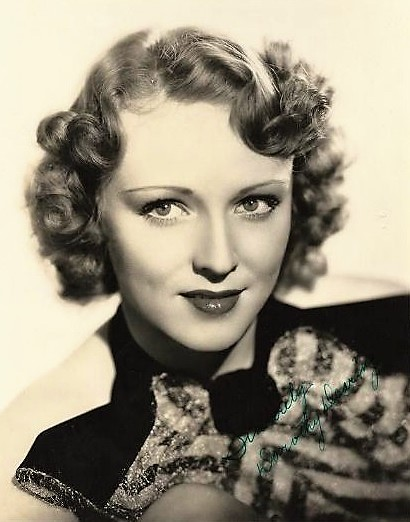
- Dearing in the 1940s
- Born: April 17, 1913; Parachute, Colorado, U.S.
- Died: April 19, 1965 (aged 52); Beverly Hills, Los Angeles, California, U.S.
- Resting place: Angeles Abbey Memorial Park, Compton, California
- Occupation: Actress
- Years active: 1933–1942
- Spouse: Roland Drew (m. 1946)
- Children: 1

Dorothy Dearing (April 17, 1913 – April 19, 1965) was an American actress. She is best known for appearing in Up the River (1938), Free, Blonde and 21 (1940) and The Great Profile (1940).

Dearing was born in Parachute, Colorado, after which she and her family moved to Denver. They lived there for two years before moving to Alhambra, California, in 1923. She attended high school in Alhambra and then studied at Pasadena Junior College. College dramatics diverted her career plans from her original desire to become a lawyer. She worked as a secretary before she became an actress.

Dearing married actor Roland Drew in 1946, and they had one child.

She died in Beverly Hills, California. She is interred with her husband in Angeles Abbey Memorial Park, Compton, California.

== Filmography ==
Year	Title	Role	Notes
1933	Dancing Lady	Chorus Girl	(uncredited)
1935	Redheads on Parade	Stenographer	(uncredited)
1935	Piernas de Seda	Dancer	(uncredited)
1936	Song and Dance Man	Showgirl	(uncredited)
1936	Girls' Dormitory	Student	(uncredited)
1938	Alexander's Ragtime Band	Girl at Recital	(uncredited)
1938	Up the River	Martha Graham	
1939	Tail Spin	Flyer	(uncredited)
1939	Wife, Husband and Friend	Mrs. Price	
1939	Hotel for Women	Miss Wilson	(uncredited)
1939	Hollywood Cavalcade	Girl with Michael at Anniversary Party	(uncredited)
1939	Swanee River	Bit role	(uncredited)
1940	City of Chance	Laura Rhinelander	(uncredited)
1940	The Blue Bird	Cypress	(uncredited)
1940	Little Old New York	Girl at Dinner Party	(uncredited)
1940	Free, Blonde and 21	Linda	
1940	Girl in 313	Emmy Lou Bentley	
1940	The Great Profile	Debutante	
1940	Murder Over New York	Mrs. Percy	(uncredited)
1940	Hudson's Bay	Girl	(uncredited)
1941	Tall, Dark and Handsome	Chorus Girl	(uncredited)
1941	That Night in Rio	Model	(uncredited)
1941	The Great American Broadcast	Bruce's Girlfriend	(uncredited)
1941	Moon Over Miami	Miss Martha Winton	(uncredited)
1941	We Go Fast	Blond at Bar	(uncredited)
1941	I Wake Up Screaming	Girl at Table	(uncredited)
1942	My Gal Sal	Sally's Friend	(uncredited)
1942	Thunder Birds	Red Cross Nurse Trainee	(uncredited)
