= Lady Raffles (film) =

1928 film

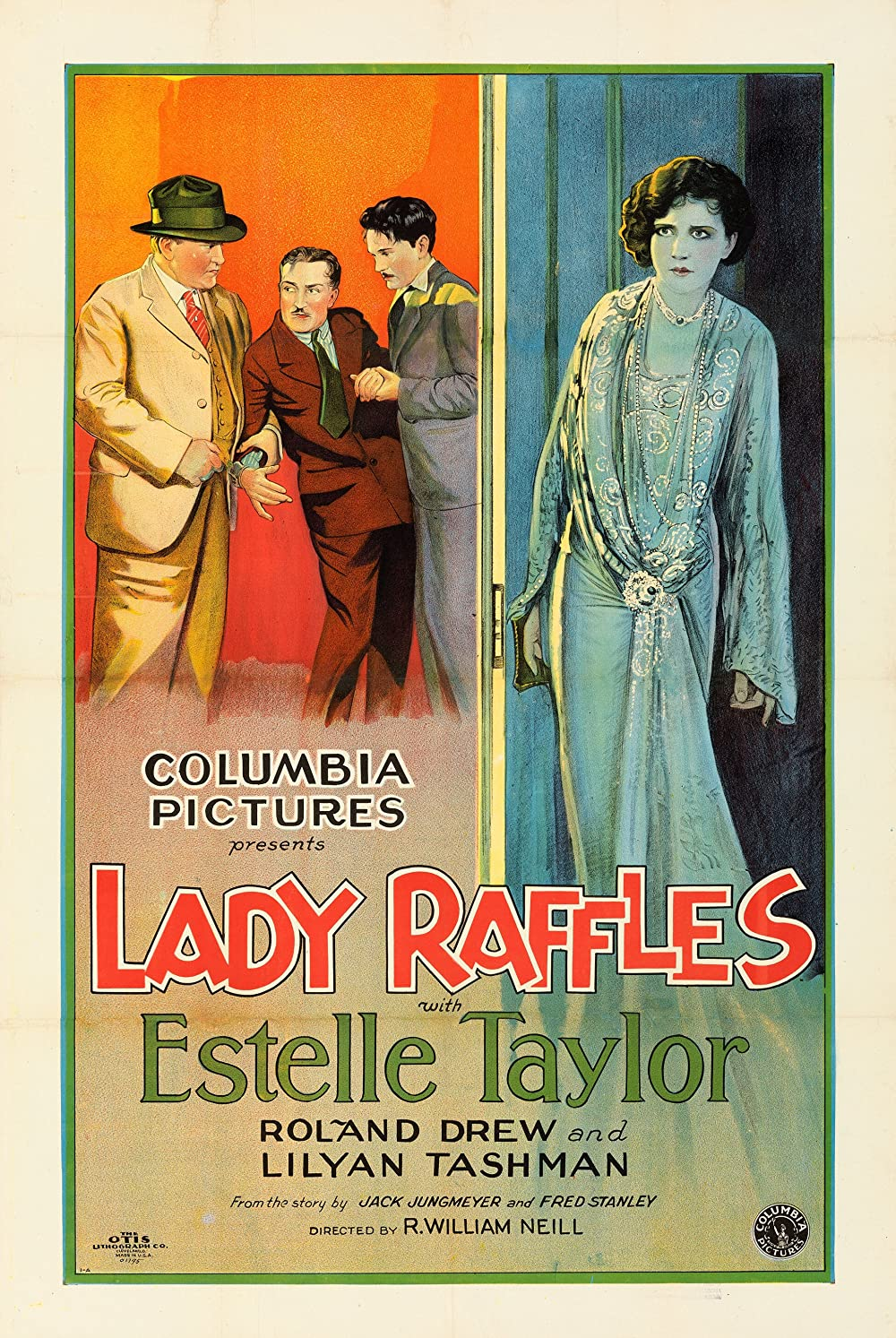
- Directed by: Roy William Neill
- Written by: Earl Hudson; Jack Jungmeyer; Fred Stanley
- Produced by: Harry Cohn
- Starring: Estelle Taylor; Roland Drew; Lilyan Tashman
- Cinematography: Joseph Walker
- Edited by: Arthur Roberts
- Production company: Columbia Pictures
- Distributed by: Columbia Pictures
- Release date: July 15, 1928
- Running time: 57 minutes
- Country: United States
- Language: English

Lady Raffles is a 1928 American silent comedy crime film directed by Roy William Neill and starring Estelle Taylor, Roland Drew and Lilyan Tashman.

== Cast ==
- Estelle Taylor as Lady Raffles
- Roland Drew as Warren Blake
- Lilyan Tashman as Lillian
- Ernest Hilliard as Dick
- Winifred Landis as Mrs. Blake

== Preservation and status ==
A complete copy is held at the Library of Congress.

== Bibliography ==
- Monaco, James. The Encyclopedia of Film. Perigee Books, 1991.
