= Edmund MacDonald =

American actor (1908–1951)

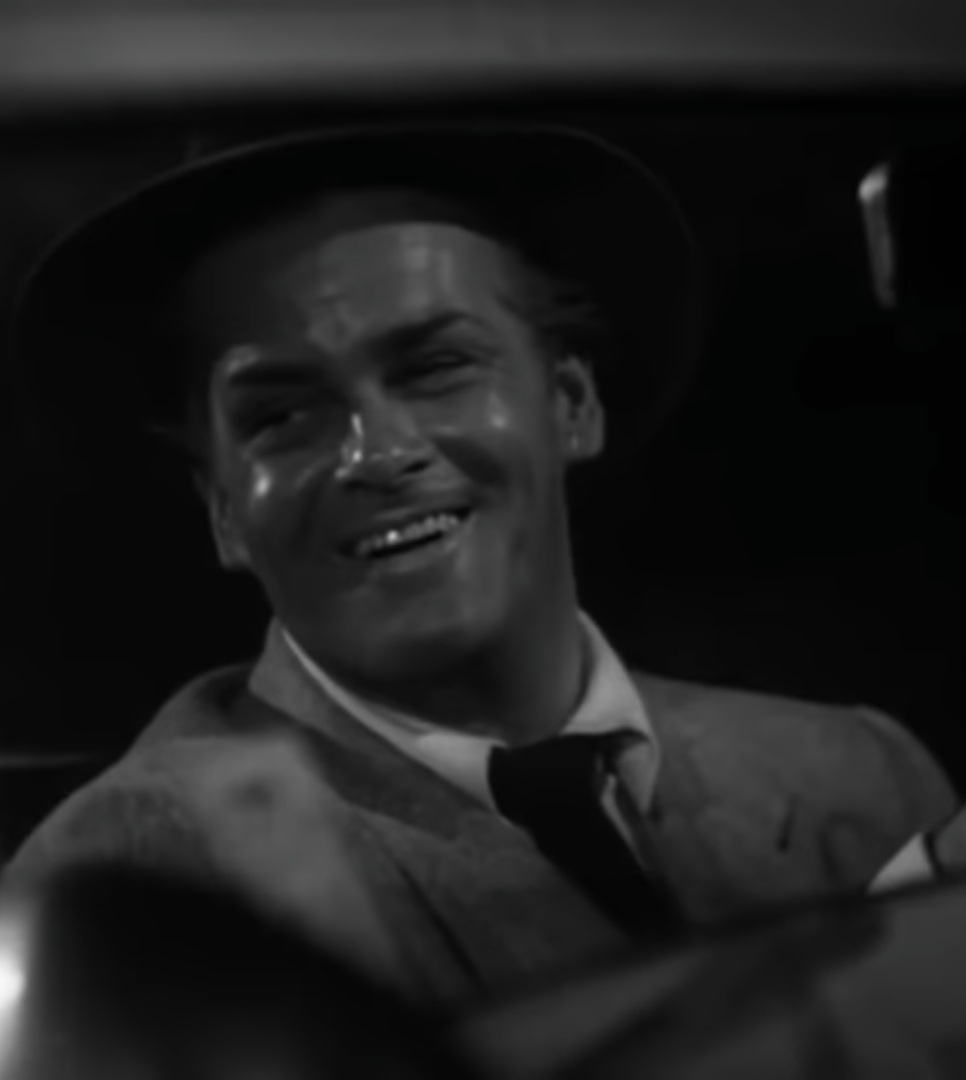
- MacDonald in Detour (1945)
- Born: Edmund Francis MacDonald; May 7, 1908; Boston, Massachusetts, U.S.
- Died: September 2, 1951 (aged 43); Los Angeles, California, U.S.
- Resting place: Los Angeles National Cemetery
- Occupation: Actor
- Years active: 1929–1949

Edmund Francis MacDonald (May 7, 1908 – September 2, 1951) was an American actor.

== Early years ==
MacDonald was born in Boston. He had one brother.

== Career ==
MacDonald gained early acting experience in stock theater on Long Island. He made his Broadway debut in Getting Even (1929). His other Broadway credits include Her Tin Soldier (1933) and I, Myself (1934).

In 1938, he was a regular on Hollywood Showcase, an old-time radio variety show. MacDonald was also a regular on the Alan Ladd radio program "Box 13".

MacDonald worked primarily as a character actor in B films. He appeared in films such as Call of the Canyon (1942), The Mantrap (1943), and Detour (1945). His last film was Red Canyon in 1949.

== Death ==
MacDonald suffered a stroke while at home at age 42 and was hospitalized; later he died of a brain hemorrhage at the Veterans' Administration Hospital in Los Angeles. He was interred at Los Angeles National Cemetery.

== Filmography ==
Year	Title	Role	Notes
1934	Enlighten Thy Daughter	Gerald Winthrop	
1938	Prison Break	Chris Nelson	
1939	I Stole a Million	First Cop	Uncredited
1939	Coast Guard	Lt. Thompson	
1939	Destry Rides Again	Rockwell	
1940	The Invisible Man Returns	Miner at Radcliffe Colliery	Uncredited
1940	Black Friday	Frank Miller	
1940	Sailor's Lady	Barnacle	
1940	Manhattan Heartbeat	Spike	
1940	Brigham Young	Elder	
1940	The Bride Wore Crutches	Dick Williams	
1940	Yesterday's Heroes	Tex Jones	
1940	The Gay Caballero	Joe Turner	
1940	Trail of the Vigilantes	Ed Wheeler	Uncredited
1941	Nice Girl?	Captain	Uncredited
1941	Texas	Comstock	
1941	Great Guns	Hippo	(with Laurel and Hardy)
1942	Castle in the Desert	Walter Hartford	
1942	To the Shores of Tripoli	Butch Burke	
1942	The Strange Case of Doctor Rx	Det. Capt. Bill Hurd	
1942	Whispering Ghosts	Jerry Gilpin	
1942	Timber	Pierre Lacour	
1942	Call of the Canyon	Thomas McCoy	
1942	Flying Tigers	Blackie Bales	
1942	Who Done It?	'Murder at Midnight' Announcer	Uncredited
1942	Heart of the Golden West	Ross Lambert	
1942	Madame Spy	Lt. Cmdr. Bill Drake	
1943	Hi'ya, Chum	Terry Barton	
1943	Sherlock Holmes in Washington	Detective Lt. Grogan	
1943	Hangmen Also Die!	Dr. Pillar	
1943	The Mantrap	Assistant District Attorney Knox	George Sherman crime thriller
1943	Corvette K-225	Lt. LeBlanc	Uncredited
1944	Timber Queen	Joe Birsdell	
1944	Sailor's Holiday	Fred Baxter	
1944	The Story of Dr. Wassell	Rear Admiral's Aide	Uncredited
1944	Roger Touhy, Gangster	FBI Agent	Uncredited
1945	The Lady Confesses	Lucky Brandon	
1945	Incendiary Blonde	Charlie Vettori	Uncredited
1945	Hold That Blonde	Slasher	
1945	Detour	Charles Haskell Jr, the driver who picks up Tom Neal	
1946	They Made Me a Killer	Jack Conley aka Chance	
1946	The Mysterious Mr. M	Anthony Waldron, the original villain	
1947	Shoot to Kill	Lawrence Dale	
1947	Blondie's Anniversary	Bob Burley	
1948	That Lady in Ermine	Captain Novak	Uncredited
1948	Black Eagle	Si	
1949	Red Canyon	Farlane	(final film role)
