= Mary Beth Hughes =

American actress

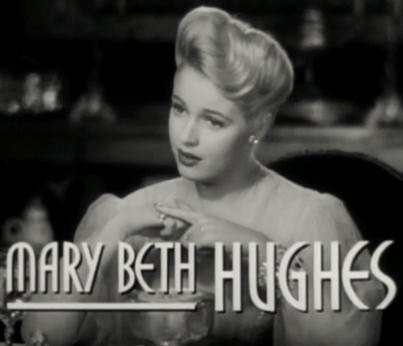
- Hughes in Design for Scandal (1941)
- Born: Mary Elizabeth Hughes; November 13, 1919; Alton, Illinois, U.S.
- Died: August 27, 1995 (aged 75); Los Angeles, California, U.S.
- Occupation: Actress
- Years active: 1939–1974
- Spouses: Ted North (m. 1943; div. 1947) David Street (m. 1948; div. 1956) Nicky Stewart (m. 1973; div. 1977)
- Children: 1

Mary Elizabeth Hughes (November 13, 1919 – August 27, 1995) was an American film, television, and stage actress best known for her roles in B movies.

== Early life and career ==
Hughes was born in Alton, Illinois. Her parents, George Joseph Hughes and Mary Frances Hughes, separated when she was an infant and divorced in 1923. After the divorce, Hughes's mother moved with her only child to Washington, DC. Hughes' grandmother, Flora Fosdick, was described as a "star of grand opera and drama [who] played with Ethel Barrymore on the stage."

As a child, Hughes began acting in stage productions. While acting in a school play in the early 1930s, her performance caught the attention of Clifford Brown, a repertory theatre company owner, who offered her a part in a touring production of Alice in Wonderland. While touring with another production in Brown's company, she was offered a contract from a talent scout with Gaumont-British Studios, but declined the offer to finish high school.

After graduating from high school in 1937, she returned to Brown's theatre company, where she continued to appear in various stage productions until the summer of 1938, when she relocated to Los Angeles with her mother to pursue a film career. After six months of failing to land movie roles, Hughes and her mother made plans to return to Washington, DC, until Hughes met an agent, Wally Ross. Ross introduced Hughes to powerful William Morris agent Johnny Hyde, who landed Hughes a contract with Metro-Goldwyn-Mayer (MGM), and she soon got a small, uncredited role in the 1939 film Broadway Serenade.

== Film career ==

After Broadway Serenade, Hughes appeared in other bit parts in films including The Women with Norma Shearer, Dancing Co-Ed with Lana Turner, and the Busby Berkeley film Fast and Furious.

In 1940, Hughes was offered a contract with 20th Century-Fox. Later that year, she landed a role opposite John Barrymore in The Great Profile, a part she later noted as one of her favorites. Fox did not renew her contract when it expired in 1943, and the following year, she began appearing in a nightclub act and soon signed a three-picture deal with Universal Pictures.

Her most famous role was as Henry Fonda's former girlfriend in the Best Picture Academy Award-nominee, The Ox-Bow Incident (1943). Throughout the mid-1940s and early 1950s, Hughes appeared in film and television roles, including I Accuse My Parents and Last of the Wild Horses (both of which were later parodied on Mystery Science Theater 3000), Anthony Mann's early noir masterpiece The Great Flamarion wherein she co-starred with Erich von Stroheim and Dan Duryea, Wanted: Dead or Alive (episode "Secret Ballot"), The Devil's Henchman, The Abbott and Costello Show, Dragnet, and Studio One.

== Later years ==
In 1961, Hughes decided to retire from acting and began working as a receptionist in a plastic surgeon's office, although she continued her appearances in nightclubs. The following year, she directed and starred in a Los Angeles production of Pajama Top. For the rest of the 1960s, she appeared in television shows such as Rawhide and Dennis the Menace. In 1970, she landed a regular role on The Red Skelton Show, appearing in 11 episodes before the show ended later that year. In 1976, she again retired from show business, explaining that she was "tired of auditioning for sexy grandma roles." Hughes' last onscreen appearance was in the 1976 film Tanya.

In the late 1970s, Hughes opened a beauty parlor in Canoga Park, California. She closed the shop in the late 1980s and began working as a telemarketer until 1991, when she was laid off.

== Personal life ==
As a starlet under contract with MGM, Hughes went on studio-appointed dates with several actors, including Lew Ayres, Franchot Tone, Mickey Rooney, and James Stewart. While under contract to Fox, she also went on arranged dates with Milton Berle and George Montgomery.

In 1940, against Fox's wishes, Hughes began a relationship with actor Robert Stack. The romance lasted a year. After her romance with Stack ended, Hughes married actor Ted North in 1943. The couple had one son, Donald, before divorcing in 1947. On April 28, 1948, she married singer/actor David Street. The marriage ended in divorce on January 23, 1956. In 1973, Hughes married her manager, Nicky Stewart, but that marriage also ended in divorce four years later.

== Death ==
Hughes died, aged 75, on August 27, 1995, from natural causes in Los Angeles. Upon her death, she was cremated, and her ashes were returned to her surviving son.

== Filmography ==
- Within the Law (1939) as Mamie (voice, uncredited)
- Broadway Serenade (1939) as Girl at Party (uncredited)
- The Kid from Texas (1939) as Polo Match Spectator (uncredited)
- Bridal Suite (1939) as Bride (uncredited)
- These Glamour Girls (1939) as Ann
- The Women (1939) as Miss Trimmerback
- Dancing Co-Ed (1939) as 'Toddy'
- Fast and Furious (1939) as Jerry Lawrence
- The Covered Trailer (1939) as Betty Higgins
- Free, Blonde and 21 (1940) as Jerry Daily
- Star Dust (1940) as June Lawrence
- Four Sons (1940) as Anna
- Lucky Cisco Kid (1940) as Lola
- The Great Profile (1940) as Sylvia
- Sleepers West (1941) as Helen Carlson
- Ride on Vaquero (1941) as Sally Slocum
- The Great American Broadcast (1941) as Secretary
- The Cowboy and the Blonde (1941) as Crystal Wayne
- Dressed to Kill (1941) as Joanne La Marr
- Charlie Chan in Rio (1941) as Joan Reynolds
- Design for Scandal (1941) as Adele Blair
- Blue, White and Perfect (1942) as Merle Garland
- The Night Before the Divorce (1942) as Lola May
- Orchestra Wives (1942) as Caroline Steele
- The Ox-Bow Incident (1942) as Rose Mapen
- Over My Dead Body (1942) as Patricia Cordry aka Pat Preston
- Good Morning, Judge (1943) as Mira Bryon
- Follow the Band (1943) as Dolly O'Brien
- Melody Parade (1943) as Anne O'Rourke
- Never a Dull Moment (1943) as Flo Parker
- Timber Queen (1944) as Elaine Graham
- Men on Her Mind (1944) as Lily Durrell
- Take It Big (1944) as Gaye Livingston
- I Accuse My Parents (1944) as Kitty Reed
- The Great Flamarion (1945) as Connie Wallace
- Rockin' in the Rockies (1945) as June McGuire
- The Lady Confesses (1945) as Vicki McGuire
- Caged Fury (1948) as Lola Tremaine
- Waterfront at Midnight (1948) as Ethel Novack
- The Return of Wildfire (1948) as Judy Marlowe
- Joe Palooka in Winner Take All (1948) as Millie
- Inner Sanctum (1948) as Jean Maxwell
- Last of the Wild Horses (1948) as Terry Williams
- El Paso (1949) as Stagecoach Nellie
- Rimfire (1949) as Polly
- Grand Canyon (1949) as Terry Lee
- The Devil's Henchman (1949) as Silky
- Square Dance Jubilee (1949) as Barbara Clayton
- Riders in the Sky (1949) as Julie Stewart
- Young Man with a Horn (1950) as Marge Martin
- Holiday Rhythm (1950) as Alice
- Passage West (1951) as Nellie McBride
- Close to My Heart (1951) as Arlene
- Highway Dragnet (1954) as Terry Smith
- Loophole (1954) as Vera
- Las Vegas Shakedown (1955) as Mabel Dooley
- Dig That Uranium (1955) as Jeanette
- Gun Battle at Monterey (1957) as Cleo
- The Blue Hour (1971)
- How's Your Love Life? (1971) as Linda Roberts
- The Working Girls (1974) as Mrs. Borden
- Tanya (1976) (final film role)

== Television credits ==
- Nash Airflyte Theatre (1 episode, 1950) as Lydia
- The Adventures of Ellery Queen (1 episode, 1951)
- Not for Publication (1 episode, 1952)
- The Philco Television Playhouse (1 episode, 1953)
- Racket Squad (1 episode, 1953) as Kendall Hastings
- The Abbott and Costello Show (1 episode, 1953) as Dixie King
- My Hero (2 episodes, 1952-1953) as Lilli Martin AKA the Atomic Blonde / Myrna
- Big Town (2 episodes, 1953–1954) as Charlotte Casterline
- The Ford Television Theatre (1 episode, 1954) as Dolores Martin
- The Public Defender (1 episode, 1954) as Eve Manchester
- The Lone Wolf (1 episode, 1954) as Barbara Kincaid
- Fireside Theater (1 episode, 1954) as Waitress
- The Man Behind the Badge (1 episode, 1955) as Rose Gilbert
- The Eddie Cantor Comedy Theater (1 episode, 1955)
- Front Row Center (2 episodes, 1955) as Miriam Blake / Kitty Packard
- Dragnet (1 episode, 1956)
- The Eve Arden Show (1 episode, 1957) as Burlesque Queen
- Colt .45 (1 episode, 1957) as Clover Haig
- Playhouse 90 (1 episode, 1958) as Mrs. Leeds
- December Bride (1 episode, 1958)
- Studio One (1 episode, 1958) as Ginger Ferris
- Buckskin (1 episode, 1958) as Diana Marlowe
- Pursuit (1 episode, 1958) as Evelyn
- Frontier Doctor (1 episode, 1958) as Lillian Lloyd
- The Adventures of Rin Tin Tin (1 episode, 1959) as Lil Morris
- Wanted: Dead or Alive (1 episode, 1959) as Dolly King
- The Thin Man (2 episodes, 1958–1959) as Eve Marloff / Pat Renard
- The Deputy (1 episode, 1961) as Madge Belden
- Dennis the Menace (1 episode, 1961) as Charles' Mother
- Holiday Lodge (1 episode, 1961) as Mona
- Rawhide (2 episodes, 1959–1963) as Lola / Sarah
- The Red Skelton Show (11 episodes, 1955–1970) as Sally Albright / Ruthie / Ruby - San Fernando Red's Accomplice / Clara Appleby / McCluskey's Moll / Velma - Philip's Accomplice
