= Up the River (1938 film) =

1938 film

- Directed by: Alfred L. Werker
- Written by: Lou Breslow; John Patrick; Maurine Dallas Watkins
- Produced by: Sol M. Wurtzel
- Starring: Preston Foster; Tony Martin; Arthur Treacher
- Cinematography: J. Peverell Marley
- Edited by: Nick DeMaggio
- Music by: Samuel Kaylin
- Production company: 20th Century Fox
- Distributed by: 20th Century Fox
- Release date: December 9, 1938
- Running time: 75 minutes
- Country: United States
- Language: English

Up the River is a 1938 American prison comedy film directed by Alfred L. Werker and starring Preston Foster and Arthur Treacher and featuring Bill "Bojangles" Robinson. The film is a remake of a 1930 film with the same name directed by John Ford and starring Spencer Tracy and Humphrey Bogart in the roles subsequently played by Foster and Tony Martin. The remake changed the sport that the plot revolves around from baseball to football.

== Plot ==
A passenger on a luxury liner ends up in a card game with men who take him for more than $20,000. After docking and graciously offering them a ride in a limousine, the man reveals his real name, Willis, and real identity, police officer, to the two men who swindled him, Chipper Morgan and Darby Randall.

Morgan and Randall are sent to prison, where, to their amazement, Willis is the new warden. Their young cellmate Tommy Grant is on the prison's football team while Tommy's sweetheart Helen Lindsey awaits his parole.

When the team improves significantly thanks to Morgan and Randall and a big game is arranged with a team from another prison, wagers are made, jailbreak schemes are hatched and complications arise. Morgan and Randall are unable to get to the game until the final play, but their touchdown makes the warden happy and their fellow prisoners as happy as prisoners can be.

== Cast ==
- Preston Foster as 'Chipper' Morgan
- Tony Martin as Tommy Grant
- Phyllis Brooks as Helen
- Slim Summerville as Slim Nelson
- Arthur Treacher as Darby Randall
- Alan Dinehart as Warden Wallis
- Eddie Collins as Fisheye Conroy
- Jane Darwell as Mrs. Graham
- Sidney Toler as Jeffrey Mitchell
- Bill Robinson as Memphis Jones
- Edward Gargan as Tiny
- Robert Allen as Ray Douglas
- Dorothy Dearing as Martha Graham
- Charles D. Brown as Warden Harris

== See also ==
- List of American football films

== Bibliography ==
- Stephen C. Wood & J. David Pincus. Reel Baseball: Essays and Interviews on the National Pastime, Hollywood and American Culture McFarland, 2003.
