= The Great Profile =

1940 film

- Directed by: Walter Lang
- Screenplay by: Milton Sperling; Hilary Lynn
- Produced by: Darryl F. Zanuck; Raymond Griffith
- Starring: John Barrymore; Mary Beth Hughes; Gregory Ratoff; John Payne; Anne Baxter; Lionel Atwill
- Cinematography: Ernest Palmer
- Edited by: Francis D. Lyon
- Music by: Cyril J. Mockridge
- Production company: Twentieth Century Fox
- Distributed by: Twentieth Century Fox
- Release date: August 30, 1940
- Running time: 82 minutes
- Country: United States
- Language: English

The Great Profile is a 1940 American comedy film directed by Walter Lang and starring John Barrymore, Mary Beth Hughes, Gregory Ratoff and John Payne.

== Plot ==
A famous actor, given to drink, nearly destroys the show, but his leading lady returns to save it. Meanwhile, a young girl tries to reform him.

== Cast ==
- John Barrymore as Evans Garrick
- Mary Beth Hughes as Sylvia Manners
- Gregory Ratoff as Boris Mefoosky
- John Payne as Richard Lansing
- Anne Baxter as Mary Maxwell
- Lionel Atwill as Dr. Bruce
- Edward Brophy as Sylvester
- Willie Fung as Confucious
- Joan Valerie as Understudy
- Charles Lane as Director
- Marc Lawrence as Tony
- Hal K. Dawson as Ticket Seller
- William Pawley as Electrician
- Eddie Dunn as Furniture Man
- James Flavin as Detective
- Dorothy Dearing as Debutante
- John Dilson as Doctor Perkins
- John Elliott as Pop - Stage Doorman
