= Herbert I. Leeds =

American film director

- Born: September 13, 1900; Manhattan, New York City, United States
- Died: May 15, 1954 (aged 53); Manhattan, New York City, United States
- Other names: Herbert Irving Levy, Herbert Levy, Bert Levy
- Occupations: Director, editor
- Years active: 1927-1953 (film)

Herbert I. Leeds (September 13, 1900 – May 15, 1954) was an American film director.

== Biography ==
Herbert Irving Levy was born on September 13, 1900, to Abraham T. Levy and had a sister, Marjorie Levy Rudman. He married Evelyn C. and had Lydia as their child.

Leeds was employed by Twentieth Century Fox, for whom he directed a number of lower-budget films such as Mr. Moto on Danger Island (1939). He was credited under a variety of different names during his career, as Herbert Levy and Bert Levy.

During World War II he served in the U.S. Army Signal Corps.

He died on May 15, 1954, in Manhattan, New York City.

== Selected filmography ==
- Five of a Kind (1938)
- Charlie Chan in City in Darkness (1939)
- Mr. Moto in Danger Island (1939)
- Romance of the Rio Grande (1941)
- Blue, White and Perfect (1942)
- Manila Calling (1942)
- Time to Kill (1942)
- It Shouldn't Happen to a Dog (1946)
- Bunco Squad (1950)

== Bibliography ==
- Youngkin, Stephen. The Lost One: A Life of Peter Lorre. University Press of Kentucky, 2005.
