= Free, Blonde and 21 =

- Directed by: Ricardo Cortez
- Screenplay by: Frances Hyland
- Produced by: Sol M. Wurtzel
- Starring: Lynn Bari; Mary Beth Hughes; Joan Davis; Henry Wilcoxon; Robert Lowery; Alan Baxter; Kay Aldridge
- Cinematography: George Barnes
- Edited by: Norman Colbert
- Music by: Samuel Kaylin
- Production company: 20th Century Fox
- Distributed by: 20th Century Fox
- Release date: March 29, 1940
- Running time: 67 minutes
- Country: United States
- Language: English

Free, Blonde and 21 is a 1940 American drama film directed by Ricardo Cortez and written by Frances Hyland. The film stars Lynn Bari, Mary Beth Hughes, Joan Davis, Henry Wilcoxon, Robert Lowery, Alan Baxter and Kay Aldridge. The film was released on March 29, 1940, by 20th Century Fox.

== Plot ==
Gerry Daly and Carol Northrup are residents of a New York City hotel for women. Gerry fakes a suicide out of anger for her married lover spurning her. At the hospital, administrator Dr. Hugh Mayberry takes a liking to Carol, while young surgeon Dr. Steve Greig falls for Gerry.

Carol and Hugh hit it off and end up marrying. Gerry, however, two-times Steve with a thief, Mickey Ryan, who robs and murders a tavern owner and is wounded in the process. Gerry pleads with Steve to operate on Mickey, who dies anyway.

After police suspicions point them toward Hugh as an accomplice, Steve confesses that he was the doctor in question. He doesn't inform on Gerry, but the cops trick her into an admission of guilt and take her away.

== Cast ==
- Lynn Bari as Carol Northrup
- Mary Beth Hughes as Gerry Daly
- Joan Davis as Nellie
- Henry Wilcoxon as Dr. Hugh Mayberry
- Robert Lowery as Dr. Stephen Greig
- Alan Baxter as Mickey Ryan
- Kay Aldridge as Adelaide Sinclair
- Helen Ericson as Amy McCall
- Chick Chandler as Gus
- Joan Valerie as Vickie
- Elyse Knox as Marjorie
- Dorothy Dearing as Linda
- Herbert Rawlinson as John Crane
- Kay Linaker as Mrs. John Crane
- Thomas E. Jackson as Inspector Saunders
- Richard Lane as Lieutenant Lake
- Frank Coghlan Jr. as Sammy
- Jerry Fletcher as Hotel clerk
- Edward Cooper as Butler
