= Ronald Alexander (playwright) =

American playwright (1917–1995)

Ronald Alexander, born Ronald George Alexander Ungerer, (February 16, 1917 in West New York, New Jersey – April 24, 1995 in The Bronx, New York City) was an American playwright. He was best known for writing Broadway comedic plays such as Time Out for Ginger (1952), The Grand Prize (1955), Holiday for Lovers (1957), and Nobody Loves an Albatross (1963).

After finishing school, Alexander had a stint singing in a band and boxing. He wrote screenplays for Return to Peyton Place, Billie, the Walt Disney TV movie Johnny Shiloh, and several episodes of The Dick Van Dyke Show. He also wrote a sequel to Time Out For Ginger called Time and Ginger in which Ginger is married to Eddie and has to confront her own daughter's sexual rebelliousness. Alexander also had several small roles in Broadway plays such as The Patriots, Light Up the Sky and The Closing Door. He died of cancer at the Calvary Hospital in The Bronx in April 1995.
