= List of American films of 1936 =

American films released in 1936

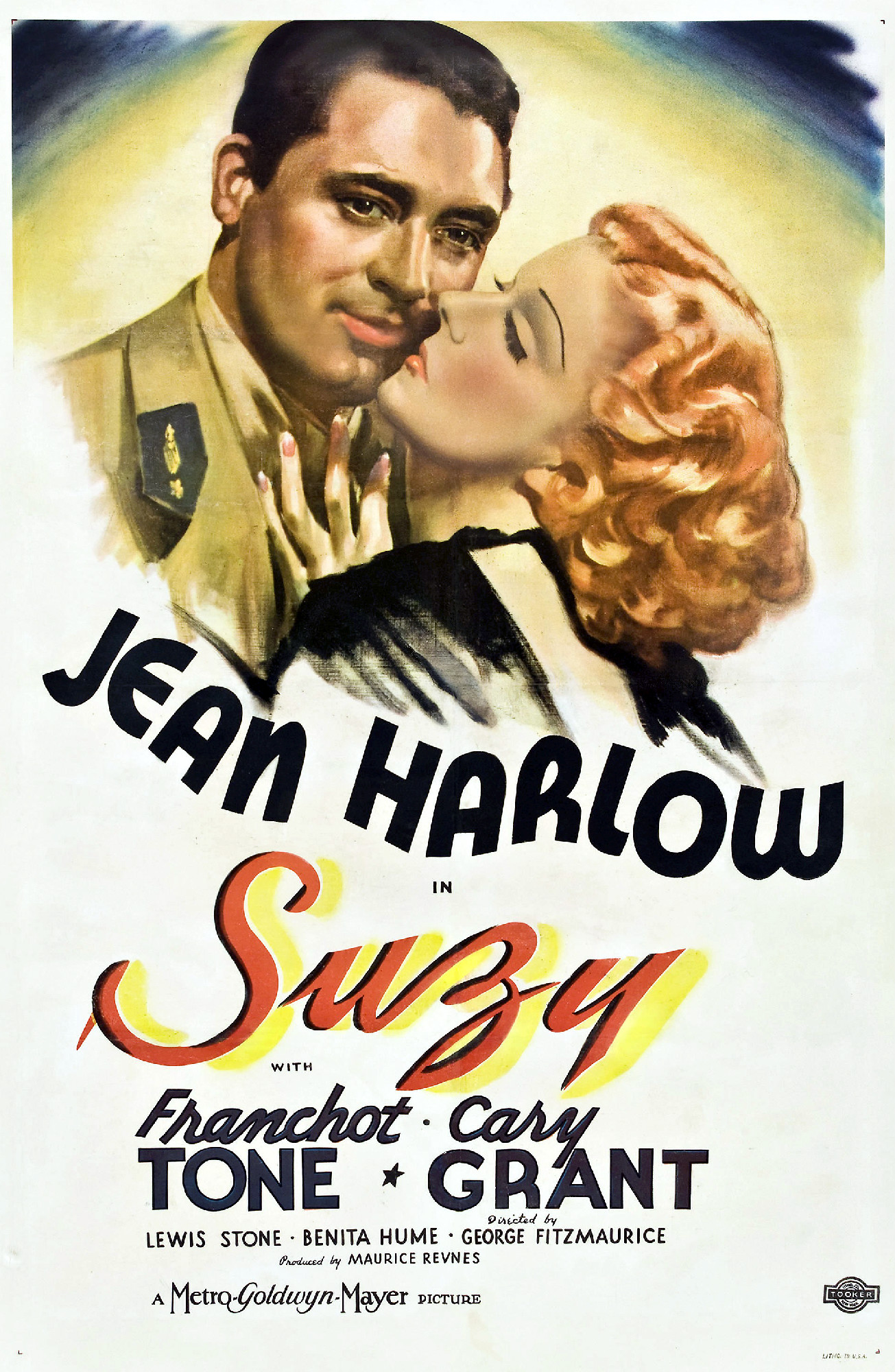
Suzy starring Cary Grant and Jean Harlow.

More than 522 American feature-length motion pictures were released in 1936.

The Great Ziegfeld won Best Picture at the Academy Awards.

== A-B ==
Title	Director	Cast	Genre	Notes
13 Hours by Air	Mitchell Leisen	Fred MacMurray, Joan Bennett, Brian Donlevy	Drama	Paramount
15 Maiden Lane	Allan Dwan	Claire Trevor, Cesar Romero, Lloyd Nolan	Crime	20th Century Fox
36 Hours to Kill	Eugene Forde	Brian Donlevy, Gloria Stuart, Warren Hymer	Drama	20th Century Fox
Absolute Quiet	George B. Seitz	Lionel Atwill, Raymond Walburn, Irene Hervey	Comedy drama	MGM
The Accusing Finger	James P. Hogan	Paul Kelly, Kent Taylor, Marsha Hunt	Crime	Paramount
Aces and Eights	Sam Newfield	Tim McCoy, Luana Walters, Rex Lease	Western	Independent
Aces Wild	Harry L. Fraser	Harry Carey, Gertrude Messinger, Theodore Lorch	Western	Independent
Adventure in Manhattan	Edward Ludwig	Jean Arthur, Joel McCrea, Reginald Owen	Comedy	Columbia
After the Thin Man	W. S. Van Dyke	William Powell, Myrna Loy, James Stewart	Comedy/Mystery	MGM
Alibi for Murder	D. Ross Lederman	William Gargan, Marguerite Churchill, Gene Morgan	Crime	Columbia
All American Chump	Edwin L. Marin	Stuart Erwin, Betty Furness, Edmund Gwenn	Comedy	MGM
Along Came Love	Bert Lytell	Irene Hervey, H. B. Warner, Charles Starrett	Comedy	Paramount
Ambush Valley	Bernard B. Ray	Bob Custer, Victoria Vinton, Eddie Phillips	Western	Independent
And So They Were Married	Elliott Nugent	Mary Astor, Melvyn Douglas, Edith Fellows	Romantic comedy	Columbia
And Sudden Death	Charles Barton	Randolph Scott, Frances Drake, Tom Brown	Drama	Paramount
Anthony Adverse	Mervyn LeRoy	Fredric March, Olivia de Havilland, Donald Woods, Anita Louise	Drama	Warner Bros. Best Picture nominee
Anything Goes	Lewis Milestone	Bing Crosby, Ethel Merman, Ida Lupino	Musical comedy	Paramount
Arizona Mahoney	James P. Hogan	Joe Cook, Robert Cummings, June Martel	Western	Paramount
The Arizona Raiders	James P. Hogan	Buster Crabbe, Raymond Hatton, Marsha Hunt	Western	Paramount
August Weekend	Charles Lamont	Valerie Hobson, Paul Harvey, Betty Compson	Drama	Chesterfield
Avenging Waters	Spencer Gordon Bennet	Ken Maynard, Beth Marion, Ward Bond	Western	Columbia
Back to Nature	James Tinling	Jed Prouty, Shirley Deane, Dixie Dunbar	Comedy	20th Century Fox
Banjo on My Knee	John Cromwell	Barbara Stanwyck, Joel McCrea, Walter Brennan	Musical comedy	20th Century Fox
Below the Deadline	Charles Lamont	Cecilia Parker, Russell Hopton, Theodore von Eltz	Crime	Chesterfield
Beloved Enemy	H. C. Potter	Merle Oberon, Brian Aherne, David Niven	Drama	United Artists
Bengal Tiger	Louis King	Barton MacLane, June Travis, Paul Graetz	Drama	Warner Bros.
Beware of Ladies	Irving Pichel	Donald Cook, Judith Allen, George Meeker	Crime	Republic
The Big Broadcast of 1937	Mitchell Leisen	Jack Benny, George Burns, Gracie Allen	Musical comedy	Paramount
Big Brown Eyes	Raoul Walsh	Cary Grant, Joan Bennett, Walter Pidgeon	Comedy mystery	Paramount
The Big Game	George Nicholls Jr.	James Gleason, Bruce Cabot, June Travis	Sports	RKO
The Big Noise	Frank McDonald	Guy Kibbee, Warren Hull, Alma Lloyd	Crime comedy	Warner Bros.
The Big Show	Mack V. Wright	Gene Autry, Kay Hughes, Smiley Burnette	Western	Republic
Black Gold	Russell Hopton	Frankie Darro, Gloria Shea, LeRoy Mason	Action	Independent
Blackmailer	Gordon Wiles	William Gargan, Florence Rice, H. B. Warner	Thriller	Columbia
Blazing Justice	Albert Herman	Bill Cody, Gertrude Messinger, Gordon Griffith	Western	Independent
The Bohemian Girl	James W. Horne, Charley Rogers	Stan Laurel, Oliver Hardy, Thelma Todd	Comedy	MGM
The Bold Caballero	Wells Root	Robert Livingston, Heather Angel, Sig Ruman	Adventure	Republic
Border Caballero	Sam Newfield	Tim McCoy, Lois January, Ralph Byrd	Western	Independent
Border Flight	Otho Lovering	Frances Farmer, John Howard, Grant Withers	Drama	Paramount
The Border Patrolman	David Howard	George O'Brien, Polly Ann Young, Mary Doran	Western	20th Century Fox
Born to Dance	Roy Del Ruth	Eleanor Powell, James Stewart, Virginia Bruce	Musical comedy	MGM
Born to Fight	Charles Hutchison	Frankie Darro, Jack La Rue, Sheila Bromley	Drama	Independent
The Boss Rider of Gun Creek	Lesley Selander	Buck Jones, Muriel Evans, Harvey Clark	Western	Universal
Boulder Dam	Frank McDonald	Ross Alexander, Patricia Ellis, Lyle Talbot	Drama	Warner Bros.
Brand of the Outlaws	Robert N. Bradbury	Bob Steele, Margaret Marquis, Jack Rockwell	Western	Independent
The Bride Walks Out	Leigh Jason	Barbara Stanwyck, Gene Raymond, Robert Young	Comedy	RKO
Brides Are Like That	William C. McGann	Ross Alexander, Anita Louise, Gene Lockhart	Comedy	Warner Bros.
The Bridge of Sighs	Phil Rosen	Onslow Stevens, Dorothy Tree, Walter Byron	Drama	Chesterfield
Brilliant Marriage	Phil Rosen	Joan Marsh, Hugh Marlowe, Inez Courtney	Drama	Chesterfield
Bulldog Edition	Charles Lamont	Evalyn Knapp, Ray Walker, Regis Toomey	Crime	Republic
Bullets or Ballots	William Keighley	Edward G. Robinson, Barton MacLane, Humphrey Bogart, Joan Blondell	Crime	Warner Bros.
Bunker Bean	William Hamilton	Owen Davis, Louise Latimer, Lucille Ball	Comedy	RKO
Burning Gold	Sam Newfield	William Boyd, Judith Allen, Lloyd Ingraham	Western	Republic

== C-D ==
Title	Director	Cast	Genre	Notes
Cain and Mabel	Lloyd Bacon	Marion Davies, Clark Gable, Allen Jenkins	Romantic comedy	Warner Bros.
California Mail	Noel M. Smith	Dick Foran, Edmund Cobb, Milton Kibbee	Western	Warner Bros.
Call of the Prairie	Howard Bretherton	William Boyd, Muriel Evans, James Ellison	Western	Paramount
Camille	George Cukor	Greta Garbo, Robert Taylor, Lionel Barrymore	Drama, Romance	MGM
Can This Be Dixie?	George Marshall	Jane Withers, Slim Summerville, Hattie McDaniel	Comedy, Musical	20th Century Fox
Captain Calamity	John Reinhardt	George Houston, Marian Nixon, Vince Barnett	Adventure, Romance	Grand National
Captain January	David Butler	Shirley Temple, Buddy Ebsen, Guy Kibbee	Musical	20th Century Fox
The Captain's Kid	Nick Grinde	May Robson, Sybil Jason, Guy Kibbee	Comedy	Warner Bros.
Career Woman	Lewis Seiler	Claire Trevor, Michael Whalen, Isabel Jewell	Drama	20th Century Fox
Caryl of the Mountains	Bernard B. Ray	Lois Wilde, Ralph Bushman, Josef Swickard	Adventure	Independent
The Case Against Mrs. Ames	William A. Seiter	Madeleine Carroll, George Brent, Arthur Treacher	Drama	Paramount
The Case of the Black Cat	William C. McGann	Ricardo Cortez, June Travis, Guy Usher	Mystery	Warner Bros. Perry Mason
The Case of the Velvet Claws	William Clemens	Warren William, Claire Dodd, Winifred Shaw	Mystery	Warner Bros.
The Cattle Thief	Spencer Gordon Bennet	Ken Maynard, Geneva Mitchell, Ward Bond	Western	Columbia
Cavalcade of the West	Harry L. Fraser	Hoot Gibson, Rex Lease, Marion Shilling	Western	Grand National
Cavalry	Robert N. Bradbury	Bob Steele, Frances Grant, Karl Hackett	Western	Republic
Ceiling Zero	Howard Hawks	James Cagney, Pat O'Brien, Barton MacLane	Drama, Adventure	Warner Bros.
Champagne Charlie	James Tinling	Paul Cavanagh, Helen Wood, Thomas Beck	Drama	20th Century Fox
The Charge of the Light Brigade	Michael Curtiz	Errol Flynn, Olivia de Havilland, Donald Crisp	Drama, Adventure	Warner Bros.
Charlie Chan at the Circus	Harry Lachman	Warner Oland, Keye Luke, Maxine Reiner	Comedy, Mystery	20th Century Fox
Charlie Chan at the Opera	H. Bruce Humberstone	Warner Oland, Keye Luke, Boris Karloff	Comedy, Mystery	20th Century Fox
Charlie Chan at the Race Track	H. Bruce Humberstone	Warner Oland, Keye Luke, Helen Wood	Comedy, Mystery	20th Century Fox
Charlie Chan's Secret	Gordon Wiles	Warner Oland, Rosina Lawrence, Henrietta Crosman	Comedy, Mystery	20th Century Fox
Chatterbox	George Nicholls Jr.	Anne Shirley, Phillips Holmes, Lucille Ball	Comedy, Drama	RKO
China Clipper	Ray Enright	Pat O'Brien, Ross Alexander, Humphrey Bogart	Drama	Warner Bros.
Code of the Range	Charles C. Coleman	Charles Starrett, Edward Coxen, Allan Cavan	Western	Columbia
Colleen	Alfred E. Green	Dick Powell, Joan Blondell, Hugh Herbert	Comedy, Musical	Warner Bros.
College Holiday	Frank Tuttle	George Burns, Gracie Allen, Jack Benny	Comedy	Paramount
Come and Get It	Howard Hawks, William Wyler	Edward Arnold, Joel McCrea, Frances Farmer, Walter Brennan	Drama	United Artists
Come Closer, Folks	D. Ross Lederman	James Dunn, Marian Marsh, Wynne Gibson	Comedy	Columbia
Comin' Round the Mountain	Mack V. Wright	Gene Autry, Ann Rutherford, Smiley Burnette	Western	Republic
Conflict	David Howard	John Wayne, Jean Rogers, Ward Bond	Drama, Sport	Universal
Counterfeit	Erle C. Kenton	Lloyd Nolan, Chester Morris, George McKay	Drama, Crime	Columbia
Counterfeit Lady	D. Ross Lederman	Ralph Bellamy, Joan Perry, Douglass Dumbrille	Comedy	Columbia
The Country Beyond	Eugene Forde	Rochelle Hudson, Paul Kelly, Alan Hale	Drama	20th Century Fox
The Country Doctor	Henry King	Jean Hersholt, Jane Darwell, John Qualen	Drama	20th Century Fox
Country Gentlemen	Ralph Staub	Chic Johnson, Ole Olsen, Joyce Compton	Comedy	Republic
The Cowboy and the Kid	Ray Taylor	Buck Jones, Dorothy Revier, Harry Worth	Western	Universal
The Cowboy Star	David Selman	Charles Starrett, Iris Meredith, Marc Lawrence	Western	Columbia
Crack-Up	Malcolm St. Clair	Peter Lorre, Brian Donlevy, Helen Wood	Drama	Fox
Craig's Wife	Dorothy Arzner	Rosalind Russell, John Boles, Alma Kruger	Drama	Columbia
Crash Donovan	William Nigh	Jack Holt, Ward Bond, Nan Grey	Drama, Crime	Universal
The Crime of Dr. Forbes	George Marshall	Gloria Stuart, Robert Kent, Henry Armetta	Crime	20th Century Fox
The Crooked Trail	S. Roy Luby	Johnny Mack Brown, Lucile Browne, John Merton	Western	Independent
Dancing Feet	Joseph Santley	Ben Lyon, Joan Marsh, Edward Nugent	Comedy	Republic
Dancing Pirate	Lloyd Corrigan	Charles Collins, Frank Morgan, Steffi Duna	Musical	RKO
Dangerous Intrigue	David Selman	Ralph Bellamy, Gloria Shea, Joan Perry	Drama	Columbia
Dangerous Waters	Lambert Hillyer	Robert Armstrong, Jack Holt, Edwin Maxwell	Drama	Universal
Daniel Boone	David Howard	George O'Brien, Heather Angel, John Carradine	Western	RKO
The Dark Hour	Charles Lamont	Ray Walker, Irene Ware, Hedda Hopper	Mystery	Chesterfield
Death in the Air	Elmer Clifton	Lona Andre, John Carroll, Leon Ames	Drama, Mystery	
Desert Gold	James P. Hogan	Buster Crabbe, Robert Cummings, Marsha Hunt	Western	Paramount
Desert Guns	Charles Hutchison	Conway Tearle, Margaret Morris, William Gould	Western	Independent
Desert Justice	William Berke	Jack Perrin, Warren Hymer, David Sharpe	Western	Independent
Desert Phantom	S. Roy Luby	Johnny Mack Brown, Sheila Bromley, Ted Adams	Western	Independent
Desire	Frank Borzage	Marlene Dietrich, Gary Cooper, William Frawley	Comedy, Drama	Paramount
The Devil Is a Sissy	W. S. Van Dyke	Freddie Bartholomew, Jackie Cooper, Mickey Rooney	Comedy drama	MGM
The Devil on Horseback	Crane Wilbur	Lili Damita, Fred Keating, Renee Torres	Comedy	Grand National
Devil's Squadron	Erle C. Kenton	Richard Dix, Lloyd Nolan, Karen Morley	Drama, Action	Columbia
The Devil-Doll	Tod Browning	Lionel Barrymore, Maureen O'Sullivan, Pedro de Cordoba	Science fiction	MGM
Dimples	William A. Seiter	Shirley Temple, Frank Morgan, Helen Westley	Musical	20th Century Fox
Dodge City Trail	Charles C. Coleman	Charles Starrett, Russell Hicks, Si Jenks	Western	Columbia
Dodsworth	William Wyler	Walter Huston, Ruth Chatterton, Paul Lukas, Mary Astor	Drama	United Artists. Best Picture nominee
Don't Gamble with Love	Dudley Murphy	Ann Sothern, Bruce Cabot, Irving Pichel	Drama	Columbia
Don't Get Personal	William Nigh	James Dunn, Sally Eilers, Pinky Tomlin	Comedy	Universal
Don't Turn 'Em Loose	Ben Stoloff	Lewis Stone, James Gleason, Betty Grable	Crime drama	RKO
Doughnuts and Society	Lewis D. Collins	Maude Eburne, Louise Fazenda, Franklin Pangborn	Comedy	Republic
Down the Stretch	William Clemens	Willie Best, Mickey Rooney, Patricia Ellis	Drama	Warner Bros.
Down to the Sea	Lewis D. Collins	Ben Lyon, Ann Rutherford, Russell Hardie	Drama	Republic
Dracula's Daughter	Lambert Hillyer	Otto Kruger, Gloria Holden, John Carradine	Horror	Universal
The Drag-Net	Vin Moore	Rod La Rocque, Marian Nixon, Betty Compson	Crime	Independent
Drift Fence	Otho Lovering	Buster Crabbe, Katherine DeMille, Tom Keene	Western	Paramount

== E-F ==
Title	Director	Cast	Genre	Notes
Early to Bed	Norman Z. McLeod	Charles Ruggles, Mary Boland, Lucien Littlefield	Comedy	Paramount
Earthworm Tractors	Ray Enright	Joe E. Brown, June Travis, Guy Kibbee	Comedy	Warner Bros.
Easy Money	Phil Rosen	Onslow Stevens, Kay Linaker, Noel Madison	Crime	Chesterfield
Easy to Take	Glenn Tryon	Marsha Hunt, John Howard, Eugene Pallette	Comedy	Paramount
Educating Father	James Tinling	Jed Prouty, Shirley Deane, Dixie Dunbar	Comedy	20th Century Fox
Ellis Island	Phil Rosen	Donald Cook, Peggy Shannon, Bradley Page	Crime drama	Chesterfield
Empty Saddles	Lesley Selander	Buck Jones, Louise Brooks, Harvey Clark	Western	Universal
End of the Trail	Erle C. Kenton	Jack Holt, Louise Henry, Douglass Dumbrille	Western	Columbia
Everybody's Old Man	James Flood	Irvin S. Cobb, Rochelle Hudson, Sara Haden	Comedy drama	20th Century Fox
Everyman's Law	Albert Ray	Johnny Mack Brown, Beth Marion, Frank Campeau	Western	Independent
Every Saturday Night	James Tinling	June Lang, Thomas Beck, Jed Prouty	Comedy	20th Century Fox
The Ex-Mrs. Bradford	Stephen Roberts	William Powell, Jean Arthur, Eric Blore	Comedy mystery	RKO
Exclusive Story	George B. Seitz	Franchot Tone, Madge Evans, Joseph Calleia	Drama	MGM
F-Man	Edward F. Cline	Jack Haley, William Frawley, Grace Bradley	Comedy	Paramount
A Face in the Fog	Robert F. Hill	Lawrence Gray, June Collyer, Forrest Taylor	Mystery	Independent
The Farmer in the Dell	Ben Holmes	Frank Albertson, Moroni Olsen, Lucille Ball	Comedy	RKO
Fast Bullets	Harry S. Webb	Tom Tyler, Rex Lease, William Gould	Western	Independent
Fatal Lady	Edward Ludwig	Mary Ellis, Ruth Donnelly, Samuel S. Hinds	Mystery	Paramount
Federal Agent	Sam Newfield	William Boyd, Irene Ware, Don Alvarado	Crime	Republic
Feud of the West	Harry L. Fraser	Hoot Gibson, Joan Barclay, Bob Kortman	Western	Grand National
The Final Hour	D. Ross Lederman	Ralph Bellamy, Marguerite Churchill, John Gallaudet	Drama	Columbia
The First Baby	Lewis Seiler	Marjorie Gateson, Shirley Deane, Hattie McDaniel	Comedy	20th Century Fox
Florida Special	Ralph Murphy	Frances Drake, Jack Oakie, Claude Gillingwater	Comedy	Paramount
Flying Hostess	Murray Roth	William Gargan, Judith Barrett, Astrid Allwyn	Drama	Universal
Follow the Fleet	Mark Sandrich	Fred Astaire, Ginger Rogers, Lucille Ball	Musical comedy	RKO
Follow Your Heart	Aubrey Scotto	Marion Talley, Luis Alberni, Nigel Bruce	Drama, Musical	Republic
For the Service	Buck Jones	Buck Jones, Beth Marion, Phillip Trent	Western	Universal
Forgotten Faces	E. A. Dupont	Herbert Marshall, Gertrude Michael, Robert Cummings	Drama	Paramount
Four Days' Wonder	Sidney Salkow	Kenneth Howell, Martha Sleeper, Alan Mowbray	Mystery	Universal
Frankie and Johnny	John H. Auer, Chester Erskine	Helen Morgan, Chester Morris, Walter Kingsford	Drama	Republic
Freshman Love	William C. McGann	Frank McHugh, Patricia Ellis, Mary Treen	Comedy, Musical	20th Century Fox
From Nine to Nine	Edgar G. Ulmer	Ruth Roland, Roland Drew, Kenne Duncan	Mystery	Independent
Fugitive in the Sky	Nick Grinde	Jean Muir, Warren Hull, Winifred Shaw	Drama	Warner Bros.
The Fugitive Sheriff	Spencer Gordon Bennet	Ken Maynard, Beth Marion, Walter Miller	Western	Columbia
Fury	Fritz Lang	Spencer Tracy, Sylvia Sidney, Walter Brennan	Drama, Crime	MGM
Fury Below	Harry L. Fraser	Russell Gleason, Maxine Doyle, LeRoy Mason	Action	Independent

== G-H ==
Title	Director	Cast	Genre	Notes
Galloping Dynamite	Harry L. Fraser	Kermit Maynard, John Merton, Stanley Blystone	Western	Independent
Gambling with Souls	Elmer Clifton	Wheeler Oakman, Bryant Washburn, Vera Steadman	Crime drama	Independent
The Garden Murder Case	Edwin L. Marin	Edmund Lowe, Virginia Bruce, Benita Hume	Mystery	MGM
The Garden of Allah	Richard Boleslawski	Marlene Dietrich, Charles Boyer, Basil Rathbone	Drama	United Artists
The Gay Desperado	Rouben Mamoulian	Ida Lupino, Leo Carrillo, Nino Martini	Comedy	United Artists
The General Died at Dawn	Lewis Milestone	Gary Cooper, Madeleine Carroll, Akim Tamiroff	Drama	Paramount
General Spanky	Fred Newmeyer	George McFarland, Phillips Holmes, Rosina Lawrence	Comedy	MGM
Gentle Julia	John G. Blystone	Jane Withers, Tom Brown, Marsha Hunt	Drama	20th Century Fox
The Gentleman from Louisiana	Irving Pichel	Eddie Quillan, Charlotte Henry, John Miljan	Drama	Republic
Ghost Patrol	Sam Newfield	Tim McCoy, Claudia Dell, Wheeler Oakman	Action	Independent
Ghost-Town Gold	Joseph Kane	Robert Livingston, Ray Corrigan, Max Terhune	Western	Republic
Ghost Town	Harry L. Fraser	Harry Carey, David Sharpe, Jane Novak	Western	Independent
The Girl from Mandalay	Howard Bretherton	Conrad Nagel, Kay Linaker, Esther Ralston	Action	Republic
Girl of the Ozarks	William Shea	Virginia Weidler, Henrietta Crosman, Leif Erickson	Drama	Paramount
The Girl on the Front Page	Harry Beaumont	Gloria Stuart, Edmund Lowe, Spring Byington	Comedy, Drama	Universal
Girls' Dormitory	Irving Cummings	Herbert Marshall, Ruth Chatterton, Simone Simon	Romance	20th Century Fox
Give Me Your Heart	Archie Mayo	Kay Francis, George Brent, Roland Young, Patric Knowles	Drama	Warner Bros.
Give Us This Night	Alexander Hall	Gladys Swarthout, Jan Kiepura, Alan Mowbray	Musical	Paramount
The Glory Trail	Lynn Shores	Tom Keene, Joan Barclay, Frank Melton	Western	Independent
Go-Get-'Em, Haines	Sam Newfield	William Boyd, Sheila Terry, Eleanor Hunt	Mystery	Republic
Go West, Young Man	Henry Hathaway	Mae West, Warren William, Alice Brady	Comedy	Paramount
Gold Diggers of 1937	Busby Berkeley, Lloyd Bacon	Dick Powell, Joan Blondell, Victor Moore	Musical	Warner Bros.
The Golden Arrow	Alfred E. Green	Bette Davis, George Brent, Eugene Pallette	Comedy, Drama	Warner Bros.
The Gorgeous Hussy	Clarence Brown	Joan Crawford, Robert Taylor, Franchot Tone	Historical	MGM
Grand Jury	Albert S. Rogell	Fred Stone, Louise Latimer, Owen Davis Jr.	Drama	RKO
Great Guy	John G. Blystone	James Cagney, Mae Clarke, Edward Brophy	Crime	Grand National
The Great Ziegfeld	Robert Z. Leonard	William Powell, Myrna Loy, Luise Rainer	Musical Biography	MGM. Academy Award for Best Picture
The Green Pastures	William Keighley	Rex Ingram, Al Stokes, Eddie Anderson	Fantasy	Warner Bros.
Gun Grit	William Berke	Jack Perrin, David Sharpe, Roger Williams	Western	Independent
The Gun Ranger	Robert N. Bradbury	Bob Steele, Eleanor Stewart, Ernie Adams	Western	Republic
Gun Smoke	Bartlett Carré	Marion Shilling, Bud Osborne, Roger Williams	Western	Independent
Guns and Guitars	Joseph Kane	Gene Autry, Smiley Burnette, Dorothy Dix	Western	Republic
Half Angel	Sidney Lanfield	Frances Dee, Brian Donlevy, Charles Butterworth	Comedy	20th Century Fox
Hair-Trigger Casey	Harry L. Fraser	Jack Perrin, Betty Mack, Robert Walker	Western	Independent
Happy Go Lucky	Aubrey Scotto	Phil Regan, Evelyn Venable, Jed Prouty	Musical	Republic
The Harvester	Joseph Santley	Alice Brady, Ann Rutherford, Russell Hardie	Comedy	Republic
Hats Off	Boris Petroff	Mae Clarke, John Payne, Luis Alberni	Musical	Grand National
Headin' for the Rio Grande	Robert N. Bradbury	Tex Ritter, Warner Richmond, Eleanor Stewart	Western	Grand National
Headline Crasher	Leslie Goodwins	Frankie Darro, Kane Richmond, Muriel Evans	Drama	Independent
Heart of the West	Howard Bretherton	William Boyd, James Ellison, George "Gabby" Hayes	Western	Paramount
Hearts Divided	Frank Borzage	Claude Rains, Dick Powell, Marion Davies	Comedy, Musical	Warner Bros.
Hearts in Bondage	Lew Ayres	James Dunn, Mae Clarke, David Manners	War	Republic
Hell-Ship Morgan	D. Ross Lederman	George Bancroft, Ann Sothern, Victor Jory	Drama	Columbia
Her Master's Voice	Joseph Santley	Edward Everett Horton, Peggy Conklin, Laura Hope Crews	Comedy	Paramount
Here Comes Carter	William Clemens	Ross Alexander, Glenda Farrell, Anne Nagel	Comedy	Warner Bros.
Here Comes Trouble	Lewis Seiler	Paul Kelly, Arline Judge, Mona Barrie	Comedy	20th Century Fox
Heroes of the Range	Spencer Gordon Bennet	Ken Maynard, June Gale, Harry Woods	Western	Columbia
Hideaway Girl	George Archainbaud	Shirley Ross, Robert Cummings, Martha Raye	Comedy	Paramount
High Tension	Allan Dwan	Brian Donlevy, Glenda Farrell, Norman Foster	Comedy drama	20th Century Fox
His Brother's Wife	W. S. Van Dyke	Robert Taylor, Barbara Stanwyck, Jean Hersholt	Drama	MGM
Hitch Hike to Heaven	Frank R. Strayer	Henrietta Crosman, Herbert Rawlinson, Russell Gleason	Drama	Chesterfield
Hollywood Boulevard	Robert Florey	John Halliday, Robert Cummings, Marsha Hunt	Drama	Paramount
Hopalong Cassidy Returns	Nate Watt	William Boyd, Gabby Hayes, Gail Sheridan	Western	Paramount
Hot Money	William C. McGann	Joseph Cawthorn, Beverly Roberts, Ross Alexander	Comedy	Warner Bros.
The House of a Thousand Candles	Arthur Lubin	Phillips Holmes, Mae Clarke, Rosita Moreno	Thriller	Republic
House of Secrets	Roland D. Reed	Muriel Evans, Leslie Fenton, Noel Madison	Drama, Mystery	Chesterfield
Human Cargo	Allan Dwan	Claire Trevor, Brian Donlevy, Alan Dinehart	Action	20th Century Fox

== I-J ==
Title	Director	Cast	Genre	Notes
I Conquer the Sea!	Victor Halperin	Steffi Duna, Dennis Morgan, Douglas Walton	Drama	Independent
I Cover Chinatown	Norman Foster	Elaine Shepard, Theodore von Eltz, Vince Barnett	Crime	Independent
I Married a Doctor	Archie Mayo	Pat O'Brien, Josephine Hutchinson, Ross Alexander	Drama	Warner Bros.
I'd Give My Life	Edwin L. Marin	Guy Standing, Frances Drake, Tom Brown	Drama	Paramount
Idaho Kid	Robert F. Hill	Rex Bell, Marion Shilling, David Sharpe	Western	Independent
In His Steps	Karl Brown	Eric Linden, Cecilia Parker, Harry Beresford	Drama	Grand National
In Paris, A.W.O.L.	Roland D. Reed	Lola Lane, Irene Ware, Lawrence Gray	Comedy	Independent
The Invisible Ray	Lambert Hillyer	Boris Karloff, Bela Lugosi, Frances Drake	Science fiction	Universal
Isle of Fury	Frank McDonald	Humphrey Bogart, Margaret Lindsay, Donald Woods	Drama, Adventure	Warner Bros.
It Couldn't Have Happened – But It Did	Phil Rosen	Reginald Denny, Evelyn Brent, Jack La Rue	Crime drama	Chesterfield
It Had to Happen	Roy Del Ruth	George Raft, Rosalind Russell, Alan Dinehart	Drama	20th Century Fox
It's Up to You	Christy Cabanne	Erville Alderson, Betty Blythe, James P. Burtis	Crime drama	Independent
Jailbreak	Nick Grinde	Barton MacLane, June Travis, Craig Reynolds	Drama	Warner Bros.
The Jungle Princess	Wilhelm Thiele	Dorothy Lamour, Ray Milland, Molly Lamont	Drama, Adventure	Paramount
Just My Luck	Ray Heinz	Charles Ray, Anne Grey, Eddie Nugent	Comedy	Independent

== K-L ==
Title	Director	Cast	Genre	Notes
Kelly of the Secret Service	Robert F. Hill	Lloyd Hughes, Jack Mulhall, Sheila Bromley	Mystery	Independent
Kelly the Second	Gus Meins	Patsy Kelly, Guinn Williams, Charley Chase	Comedy	MGM
The Kid Ranger	Robert N. Bradbury	Bob Steele, William Farnum, Joan Barclay	Western	Independent
Killer at Large	David Selman	Mary Brian, George McKay, Betty Compson	Mystery	Columbia
King of Burlesque	Sidney Lanfield	Warner Baxter, Alice Faye, Fats Waller	Comedy, Musical	20th Century Fox
King of Hockey	Noel M. Smith	Dick Purcell, Anne Nagel, Marie Wilson	Drama	Warner Bros.
King of the Pecos	Joseph Kane	John Wayne, Muriel Evans, Cy Kendall	Western	Republic
King of the Royal Mounted	Howard Bretherton	Robert Kent, Rosalind Keith, Alan Dinehart	Western	20th Century Fox
The King Steps Out	Josef von Sternberg	Grace Moore, Franchot Tone, Victor Jory	Musical	Columbia
Klondike Annie	Raoul Walsh	Mae West, Victor McLaglen, Phillip Reed	Comedy	Paramount
Ladies in Love	Edward H. Griffith	Loretta Young, Janet Gaynor, Don Ameche	Comedy, Romance	Fox
Lady Be Careful	Theodore Reed	Lew Ayres, Mary Carlisle, Grant Withers	Drama	Paramount
The Lady Consents	Stephen Roberts	Ann Harding, Herbert Marshall, Margaret Lindsay	Melodrama	RKO
Lady from Nowhere	Gordon Wiles	Mary Astor, Charles Quigley, Thurston Hall	Crime	Columbia
Lady Luck	Charles Lamont	Patricia Farr, Iris Adrian, Jameson Thomas	Comedy	Chesterfield
Lady of Secrets	Marion Gering	Ruth Chatterton, Lionel Atwill, Otto Kruger	Drama	Columbia
Last of the Warrens	Robert N. Bradbury	Bob Steele, Margaret Marquis, Charles King	Western	Independent
The Last Outlaw	Christy Cabanne	Harry Carey, Hoot Gibson, Tom Tyler	Western	RKO
The Last of the Mohicans	George B. Seitz	Randolph Scott, Bruce Cabot, Henry Wilcoxon	Adventure	United Artists
Laughing at Trouble	Frank R. Strayer	Jane Darwell, Allan Lane, Lois Wilson	Comedy	20th Century Fox
Laughing Irish Eyes	Joseph Santley	Phil Regan, Evalyn Knapp, Walter C. Kelly	Comedy	Republic
Law and Lead	Robert F. Hill	Rex Bell, Harlene Wood, Hal Taliaferro	Western	Independent
The Law in Her Hands	William Clemens	Margaret Lindsay, Glenda Farrell, Warren Hull	Drama	Warner Bros.
The Law Rides	Robert N. Bradbury	Bob Steele, Harley Wood, Buck Connors	Western	Independent
The Lawless Nineties	Joseph Kane	John Wayne, Ann Rutherford, Gabby Hayes	Western	Republic
The Leathernecks Have Landed	Howard Bretherton	Lew Ayres, Clay Clement, Ward Bond	Drama, Adventure	Republic
The Leavenworth Case	Lewis D. Collins	Donald Cook, Jean Rouverol, Norman Foster	Mystery	Republic
Legion of Terror	Charles C. Coleman	Bruce Cabot, Ward Bond, Marguerite Churchill	Drama, Crime	Columbia
Let's Make a Million	Ray McCarey	Charlotte Wynters, Edward Everett Horton, Porter Hall	Comedy	Paramount
Let's Sing Again	Kurt Neumann	Bobby Breen, Henry Armetta, Vivienne Osborne	Musical	RKO
Libeled Lady	Jack Conway	Jean Harlow, William Powell, Spencer Tracy	Comedy, Romance	MGM. Best Picture nominee
Lightnin' Bill Carson	Sam Newfield	Tim McCoy, Lois January, Rex Lease	Western	Independent
The Lion's Den	Sam Newfield	Tim McCoy, Joan Woodbury, Don Barclay	Western	Independent
The Lion Man	John P. McCarthy	Jon Hall, Kathleen Burke, Ted Adams	Adventure	Independent
Little Lord Fauntleroy	John Cromwell	Freddie Bartholomew, C. Aubrey Smith, Mickey Rooney	Comedy, Drama	United Artists
Little Miss Nobody	John G. Blystone	Jane Withers, Jane Darwell, Ralph Morgan	Drama	20th Century Fox
The Little Red Schoolhouse	Charles Lamont	Lloyd Hughes, Dickie Moore, Ann Doran	Drama	Chesterfield
Lloyd's of London	Henry King	Freddie Bartholomew, Madeleine Carroll, Tyrone Power	Historical	Fox
The Lonely Trail	Joseph Kane	John Wayne, Ann Rutherford, Cy Kendall	Western	Republic
The Longest Night	Errol Taggart	Robert Young, Florence Rice, Julie Haydon	Mystery	MGM
Love Before Breakfast	Walter Lang	Carole Lombard, Cesar Romero, Preston Foster	Comedy	Universal
Love Begins at 20	Frank McDonald	Hugh Herbert, Patricia Ellis, Warren Hull	Comedy	Warner Bros.
Love Letters of a Star	Lewis R. Foster	Polly Rowles, Walter Coy, Ralph Forbes	Mystery	Universal
Love on a Bet	Leigh Jason	Gene Raymond, Wendy Barrie, Helen Broderick	Romantic Comedy	RKO
Love on the Run	W. S. Van Dyke	Joan Crawford, Clark Gable, Franchot Tone	Comedy, Romance	MGM
The Luckiest Girl in the World	Edward Buzzell	Jane Wyatt, Eugene Pallette, Catherine Doucet	Comedy	Universal
Lucky Corrigan	Lewis D. Collins	William Gargan, Molly Lamont, Libby Taylor	Drama	Columbia
Lucky Terror	Alan James	Hoot Gibson Lona Andre, George Chesebro	Western	Grand National

== M-N ==
Title	Director	Cast	Genre	Notes
M'Liss	George Nicholls	Anne Shirley, John Beal, Guy Kibbee	Drama	RKO
Mad Holiday	George B. Seitz	Edmund Lowe, Elissa Landi, ZaSu Pitts	Comedy, Mystery	MGM
The Magnificent Brute	John G. Blystone	Victor McLaglen, Binnie Barnes, Jean Dixon	Drama	Universal
Make Way for a Lady	David Burton	Anne Shirley, Herbert Marshall, Gertrude Michael	Comedy	RKO
A Man Betrayed	John H. Auer	Edward J. Nugent, Kay Hughes, Theodore von Eltz	Crime comedy	Republic
Man Hunt	William Clemens	Ricardo Cortez, Marguerite Churchill, William Gargan	Comedy	Warner Bros.
The Man I Marry	Ralph Murphy	Doris Nolan, Nigel Bruce, Michael Whalen	Drama	Universal
The Man Who Lived Twice	Harry Lachman	Ralph Bellamy, Thurston Hall, Isabel Jewell	Drama, Crime	Columbia
The Mandarin Mystery	Ralph Staub	Eddie Quillan, Charlotte Henry, Rita La Roy	Mystery	Republic
Mariners of the Sky	Nate Watt	William Gargan, Claire Dodd, Douglas Fowley	Comedy	Republic
Mary of Scotland	John Ford	Katharine Hepburn, Fredric March, Moroni Olsen	Historical	RKO
Men of the Plains	Robert F. Hill	Rex Bell, Joan Barclay, Charles King	Western	Independent
Meet Nero Wolfe	Herbert Biberman	Edward Arnold, Lionel Stander, Dennie Moore	Mystery	Columbia
A Message to Garcia	George Marshall	John Boles, Barbara Stanwyck, Wallace Beery	War	20th Century Fox
The Milky Way	Leo McCarey	Harold Lloyd, Adolphe Menjou, Helen Mack	Comedy	Paramount
The Millionaire Kid	Bernard B. Ray	Bryant Washburn, Betty Compson, Charles Delaney	Drama	Independent
Mind Your Own Business	Norman Z. McLeod	Charles Ruggles, Alice Brady, Gene Lockhart	Comedy	Paramount
The Mine with the Iron Door	David Howard	Richard Arlen, Cecilia Parker, Henry B. Walthall	Adventure	Columbia
Missing Girls	Phil Rosen	Roger Pryor, Muriel Evans, Noel Madison	Crime	Chesterfield
Modern Times	Charles Chaplin	Charles Chaplin, Paulette Goddard, Chester Conklin	Comedy drama	United Artists
The Moon's Our Home	William A. Seiter	Henry Fonda, Margaret Sullavan, Walter Brennan	Comedy	Paramount
Moonlight Murder	Edwin L. Marin	Chester Morris, Madge Evans, Benita Hume	Crime	MGM
More Than a Secretary	Alfred E. Green	Jean Arthur, George Brent, Ruth Donnelly	Comedy, Romance	Columbia
Mr. Cinderella	Edward Sedgwick	Betty Furness, Arthur Treacher, Jack Haley	Comedy	MGM
Mr. Deeds Goes to Town	Frank Capra	Gary Cooper, Jean Arthur, Lionel Stander	Comedy	Columbia. Best Picture nominee
Mummy's Boys	Fred Guiol	Bert Wheeler, Robert Woolsey, Barbara Pepper	Comedy	RKO
Murder at Glen Athol	Frank R. Strayer	John Miljan, Irene Ware, Iris Adrian	Mystery	Chesterfield
Murder by an Aristocrat	Frank McDonald	Lyle Talbot, Marguerite Churchill, Claire Dodd	Mystery	Warner Bros.
The Murder of Dr. Harrigan	Frank McDonald	Ricardo Cortez, Kay Linaker, Mary Astor	Mystery	Warner Bros.
Murder on a Bridle Path	William Hamilton	James Gleason, Helen Broderick, Louise Latimer	Mystery	RKO
Murder with Pictures	Charles Barton	Lew Ayres, Gail Patrick, Paul Kelly	Mystery	Paramount
The Music Goes 'Round	Victor Schertzinger	Harry Richman, Rochelle Hudson, Walter Connolly	Musical	Columbia
Muss 'Em Up	Charles Vidor	Preston Foster, Alan Mowbray, Ralph Morgan	Mystery	RKO
My American Wife	Harold Young	Francis Lederer, Ann Sothern, Billie Burke	Comedy	Paramount
My Man Godfrey	Gregory La Cava	William Powell, Carole Lombard, Alice Brady, Gail Patrick, Eugene Pallette	Comedy	Universal
My Marriage	George Archainbaud	Claire Trevor, Kent Taylor, Pauline Frederick	Drama	20th Century Fox
The Mysterious Avenger	David Selman	Charles Starrett, Joan Perry, Wheeler Oakman	Western	Columbia
Mysterious Crossing	Arthur Lubin	James Dunn, Jean Rogers, Andy Devine	Mystery	Universal
Neighborhood House	Alan Hale	Charley Chase, Rosina Lawrence, Darla Hood	Comedy	MGM
Next Time We Love	Edward H. Griffith	James Stewart, Margaret Sullavan, Ray Milland	Drama, Romance	Universal
Night Cargo	Charles Hutchison	Lloyd Hughes, Julie Bishop, Walter Miller	Crime	Independent
Night Waitress	Lew Landers	Margot Grahame, Gordon Jones, Billy Gilbert	Drama, Crime	RKO
Nobody's Fool	Arthur Greville Collins	Edward Everett Horton, Glenda Farrell, Cesar Romero	Comedy	Universal
North of Nome	William Nigh	Jack Holt, Evelyn Venable, John Miljan	Drama	Columbia

== O-P ==
Title	Director	Cast	Genre	Notes
O'Malley of the Mounted	David Howard	George O'Brien, Irene Ware, Stanley Fields	Western	20th Century Fox
Oh, Susanna!	Joseph Kane	Gene Autry, Frances Grant, Smiley Burnette	Western	Republic
The Old Corral	Joseph Kane	Gene Autry, Irene Manning, Smiley Burnette	Western	Republic
Old Hutch	J. Walter Ruben	Wallace Beery, Cecilia Parker, Eric Linden	Comedy	MGM
One in a Million	Sidney Lanfield	Sonja Henie, Adolphe Menjou, Don Ameche	Comedy, Musical	Fox
One Rainy Afternoon	Rowland V. Lee	Ida Lupino, Hugh Herbert, Roland Young	Comedy	United Artists
The Oregon Trail	Scott Pembroke	John Wayne, Ann Rutherford, Joseph W. Girard	Western	Republic
Our Relations	Harry Lachman	Stan Laurel, Oliver Hardy, Alan Hale	Comedy	MGM
Outlaws of the Range	Albert Herman	Bill Cody, William McCall, Gordon Griffith	Western	Independent
Paddy O'Day	Lewis Seiler	Jane Withers, Pinky Tomlin, Rita Hayworth	Musical	20th Century Fox
Palm Springs	Aubrey Scotto	Frances Langford, Guy Standing, Spring Byington	Comedy drama	Paramount
Panic on the Air	D. Ross Lederman	Lew Ayres, Florence Rice, Edwin Maxwell	Drama	Columbia
Parole!	Lew Landers	Henry Hunter, Ann Preston, Anthony Quinn	Drama, Crime	Universal
Pennies from Heaven	Norman Z. McLeod	Bing Crosby, Madge Evans, Louis Armstrong	Comedy, Musical	Columbia
Pepper	James Tinling	Jane Withers, Irvin S. Cobb, Dean Jagger	Comedy	20th Century Fox
The Petrified Forest	Archie Mayo	Bette Davis, Leslie Howard, Humphrey Bogart	Drama, Crime	Warner Bros.
Petticoat Fever	George Fitzmaurice	Robert Montgomery, Myrna Loy, Reginald Owen	Comedy	MGM
The Phantom of the Range	Robert F. Hill	Tom Tyler, Beth Marion, Forrest Taylor	Western	Independent
Phantom Patrol	Charles Hutchison	Kermit Maynard, Joan Barclay, George Cleveland	Western	Independent
Picadilly Jim	Robert Z. Leonard	Robert Montgomery, Frank Morgan, Billie Burke	Romantic comedy	MGM
Pigskin Parade	David Butler	Stuart Erwin, Patsy Kelly, Jack Haley	Musical comedy	Fox
Pinto Rustlers	Harry S. Webb	Tom Tyler, George Walsh, Earl Dwire	Western	Reliable
The Plainsman	Cecil B. DeMille	Gary Cooper, Jean Arthur, James Ellison	Western	Paramount
The Plot Thickens	Ben Holmes	James Gleason, ZaSu Pitts, Louise Latimer	Mystery	RKO
Polo Joe	William C. McGann	Joe E. Brown, Carol Hughes, Richard 'Skeets' Gallagher	Comedy	Warner Bros.
Poor Little Rich Girl	Irving Cummings	Shirley Temple, Alice Faye, Jack Haley	Musical	20th Century Fox
Poppy	A. Edward Sutherland	W. C. Fields, Rochelle Hudson, Richard Cromwell	Comedy	Paramount
Postal Inspector	Otto Brower	Patricia Ellis, Ricardo Cortez, Bela Lugosi	Crime	Universal
The President's Mystery	Phil Rosen	Henry Wilcoxon, Sidney Blackmer, Betty Furness	Drama, Mystery	Republic
The Preview Murder Mystery	Robert Florey	Reginald Denny, Frances Drake, Gail Patrick	Mystery	Paramount
Pride of the Marines	D. Ross Lederman	Charles Bickford, Florence Rice, Thurston Hall	Comedy	Columbia
The Princess Comes Across	William K. Howard	Carole Lombard, Fred MacMurray, Douglass Dumbrille	Comedy mystery	Paramount
Prison Shadows	Robert F. Hill	Edward J. Nugent, Lucille Lund, Joan Barclay	Drama	Independent
The Prisoner of Shark Island	John Ford	Warner Baxter, Gloria Stuart, Claude Gillingwater	Biography	20th Century Fox
Private Number	Roy Del Ruth	Loretta Young, Robert Taylor, Basil Rathbone	Drama	20th Century Fox
Public Enemy's Wife	Nick Grinde	Pat O'Brien, Margaret Lindsay, Cesar Romero	Crime	Warner Bros.

== R-S ==
Title	Director	Cast	Genre	Notes
Racing Blood	Victor Halperin	Frankie Darro, Kane Richmond, Gladys Blake	Sports	Independent
Rainbow on the River	Kurt Neumann	Bobby Breen, May Robson, Charles Butterworth	Musical	RKO
Ramona	Henry King	Loretta Young, Don Ameche, Kent Taylor	Drama	20th Century Fox
Rebellion	Lynn Shores	Tom Keene, Rita Hayworth, Duncan Renaldo	Western	Independent
The Reckless Way	Raymond K. Johnson	Marian Nixon, Kane Richmond, Inez Courtney	Drama	Independent
Red Lights Ahead	Roland D. Reed	Andy Clyde, Lucile Gleason, Ann Doran	Comedy	Chesterfield
Red River Valley	B. Reeves Eason	Gene Autry, Frances Grant, Smiley Burnette	Western	Republic
Reefer Madness	Louis J. Gasnier	Dorothy Short, Lillian Miles, Dave O'Brien	Exploitation	Independent
The Return of Jimmy Valentine	Lewis D. Collins	Roger Pryor, Charlotte Henry, Robert Warwick	Crime	Republic
The Return of Sophie Lang	George Archainbaud	Gertrude Michael, Guy Standing, Ray Milland	Drama	Paramount
Reunion	Norman Taurog	Jean Hersholt, Rochelle Hudson, Dionne Quintuplets	Comedy	20th Century Fox
Revolt of the Zombies	Victor Halperin	Dean Jagger, Dorothy Stone, Roy D'Arcy	Horror	Independent
Rhythm on the Range	Norman Taurog	Bing Crosby, Frances Farmer, Bob Burns	Musical western	Paramount
Ride 'Em Cowboy	Lesley Selander	Buck Jones, Luana Walters, Donald Kirke	Western	Universal
Ride Ranger Ride	Joseph Kane	Gene Autry, Kay Hughes, Smiley Burnette	Western	Republic
The Riding Avenger	Harry L. Fraser	Hoot Gibson, Ruth Mix, June Gale	Western	Grand National
Ridin' On	Ira Webb	Tom Tyler, Joan Barclay, Rex Lease	Western	Independent
Riffraff	J. Walter Ruben	Spencer Tracy, Jean Harlow, Mickey Rooney	Comedy, Crime	MGM
Ring Around the Moon	Charles Lamont	Donald Cook, Erin O'Brien-Moore, Ann Doran	Drama	Chesterfield
Rio Grande Ranger	Spencer Gordon Bennet	Robert Allen, Iris Meredith, Paul Sutton	Western	Columbia
Rio Grande Romance	Robert F. Hill	Edward J. Nugent, Maxine Doyle, Lucille Lund	Adventure	Independent
Rip Roarin' Buckaroo	Robert F. Hill	Tom Tyler, Beth Marion, Forrest Taylor	Western	Independent
Road Gang	Louis King	Donald Woods, Kay Linaker, Joseph Crehan	Drama	Warner Bros.
The Road to Glory	Howard Hawks	Lionel Barrymore, Fredric March, June Lang	War drama	20th Century Fox
Roaming Lady	Albert S. Rogell	Fay Wray, Thurston Hall, Ralph Bellamy	Drama	Columbia
Roamin' Wild	Bernard B. Ray	Tom Tyler, Al Ferguson, Max Davidson	Western	Independent
Roarin' Guns	Sam Newfield	Tim McCoy, Rex Lease, Wheeler Oakman	Western	Independent
Roarin' Lead	Sam Newfield	Robert Livingston, Ray Corrigan, Christine Maple	Western	Republic
Robin Hood of El Dorado	William A. Wellman	Warner Baxter, Margo, Bruce Cabot	Western	MGM
Rogue of the Range	S. Roy Luby	Johnny Mack Brown, Lois January, Stephen Chase	Western	Independent
The Rogues Tavern	Robert F. Hill	Wallace Ford, Joan Woodbury, Barbara Pepper	Comedy horror	Independent
Romance Rides the Range	Harry L. Fraser	Fred Scott, Cliff Nazarro, Marion Shilling	Western	Independent
Romeo and Juliet	George Cukor	Norma Shearer, Leslie Howard, John Barrymore, Basil Rathbone	Drama	MGM. Best Picture nominee
Rose Bowl	Charles Barton	Eleanore Whitney, Tom Brown, Buster Crabbe	Comedy	Paramount
Rose Marie	W. S. Van Dyke	Jeanette MacDonald, Nelson Eddy, James Stewart	Musical Western	MGM
Rose of the Rancho	Marion Gering	John Boles, Gladys Swarthout, Charles Bickford	Drama	Paramount
San Francisco	W. S. Van Dyke	Clark Gable, Jeanette MacDonald, Spencer Tracy	Drama	MGM. Best Picture nominee
Santa Fe Bound	Harry S. Webb	Tom Tyler, Richard Cramer, Slim Whitaker	Western	Independent
Satan Met a Lady	William Dieterle	Bette Davis, Warren William, Alison Skipworth	Comedy, Drama	Warner Bros.
Sea Spoilers	Frank R. Strayer	John Wayne, Nan Grey, William Bakewell	Drama, Mystery	Universal
Second Wife	Edward Killy	Gertrude Michael, Walter Abel, Erik Rhodes	Drama	RKO
Secret Patrol	David Selman	Charles Starrett, Henry Mollison, J.P. McGowan	Western	Columbia
Senor Jim	Jacques Jaccard	Conway Tearle, Barbara Bedford, Betty Mack	Western	Independent
Shakedown	David Selman	Lew Ayres, Joan Perry, Henry Mollison	Crime	Columbia
Show Boat	James Whale	Irene Dunne, Allan Jones, Paul Robeson	Musical	Universal
Silly Billies	Fred Guiol	Bert Wheeler, Robert Woolsey, Dorothy Lee	Comedy	RKO
Silks and Saddles	Robert F. Hill	Bruce Bennett, Toby Wing, Fuzzy Knight	Action	Independent
Silver Spurs	Ray Taylor	Gabby Hayes, Buck Jones, Muriel Evans	Western	Universal
Sing, Baby, Sing	Sidney Lanfield	Alice Faye, Adolphe Menjou, Gregory Ratoff	Musical	20th Century Fox
Sing Me a Love Song	Ray Enright	James Melton, Patricia Ellis, ZaSu Pitts	Comedy, Musical	Warner Bros.
The Singing Cowboy	Mack V. Wright	Gene Autry, Lois Wilde, Smiley Burnette	Western	Republic
The Singing Kid	William Keighley	Al Jolson, Sybil Jason, Beverly Roberts	Musical	Warner Bros.
Sinner Take All	Errol Taggart	Bruce Cabot, Margaret Lindsay, Joseph Calleia	Murder mystery	MGM
Sins of Man	Otto Brower	Jean Hersholt, Don Ameche, Allen Jenkins	Drama	20th Century Fox
Sitting on the Moon	Ralph Staub	Roger Pryor, Grace Bradley, Pert Kelton	Musical	Republic
The Sky Parade	Otho Lovering	William Gargan, Katherine DeMille, Kent Taylor	Drama	Paramount
Small Town Girl	William A. Wellman	Robert Taylor, Janet Gaynor, James Stewart	Comedy, Drama	MGM
Smartest Girl in Town	Joseph Santley	Ann Sothern, Gene Raymond, Eric Blore	Comedy	RKO
Snowed Under	Ray Enright	George Brent, Genevieve Tobin, Glenda Farrell	Comedy	Warner Bros.
Soak the Rich	Ben Hecht, Charles MacArthur	Walter Connolly, Lionel Stander, Ilka Chase	Comedy	Paramount
A Son Comes Home	E.A. Dupont	Mary Boland, Julie Haydon, Donald Woods	Drama	Paramount
Song and Dance Man	Allan Dwan	Claire Trevor, Michael Whalen, Paul Kelly	Drama	20th Century Fox
Song of the Gringo	John P. McCarthy	Tex Ritter, Joan Woodbury, Monte Blue	Western	Grand National
Song of the Saddle	Louis King	Dick Foran, Alma Lloyd, Charles Middleton	Western	Warner Bros.
Song of the Trail	Russell Hopton	Kermit Maynard, Evelyn Brent, Fuzzy Knight	Western	Independent
Sons o' Guns	Lloyd Bacon	Joe E. Brown, Joan Blondell, Beverly Roberts	Comedy	Warner Bros.
Special Investigator	Louis King	Richard Dix, Margaret Callahan, Owen Davis Jr.	Drama, Crime	RKO
Speed	Edwin L. Marin	James Stewart, Wendy Barrie, Ralph Morgan	Action	MGM
The Speed Reporter	Bernard B. Ray	Richard Talmadge, Luana Walters, Richard Cramer	Crime	Independent
Spendthrift	Raoul Walsh	Henry Fonda, Pat Paterson, Mary Brian	Romance	Paramount
Stage Struck	Busby Berkeley	Dick Powell, Joan Blondell, Frank McHugh	Comedy, Musical	Warner Bros.
Stampede	Ford Beebe	Charles Starrett, J.P. McGowan, Finis Barton	Western	Columbia
Star for a Night	Lewis Seiler	Claire Trevor, Jane Darwell, Dean Jagger	Drama	20th Century Fox
Step on It	Harry S. Webb	Richard Talmadge, Lois Wilde, Roger Williams	Crime	Independent
Stormy Trails	Sam Newfield	Rex Bell, Lois Wilde, Lane Chandler	Western	Independent
The Story of Louis Pasteur	William Dieterle	Paul Muni, Josephine Hutchinson, Anita Louise	Biography	Warner Bros. Best Picture nominee
Stowaway	William A. Seiter	Shirley Temple, Robert Young, Eugene Pallette	Comedy, Musical	20th Century Fox
Straight from the Shoulder	Stuart Heisler	Ralph Bellamy, Katherine Locke, Roger Williams	Drama	Paramount
Strike Me Pink	Norman Taurog	Eddie Cantor, Ethel Merman, Sally Eilers	Musical comedy	United Artists
Sunset of Power	Ray Taylor	Buck Jones, Donald Kirke, Charles Middleton	Western	Universal
Sutter's Gold	James Cruze	Edward Arnold, Lee Tracy, Montagu Love	Drama, Western	Universal
Suzy	George Fitzmaurice	Jean Harlow, Franchot Tone, Cary Grant	Drama	MGM
Swing Time	George Stevens	Fred Astaire, Ginger Rogers, Victor Moore	Comedy, Musical	RKO
Sworn Enemy	Edwin L. Marin	Florence Rice, Robert Young, Joseph Calleia	Drama, Crime	MGM

== T-U ==
Title	Director	Cast	Genre	Notes
Taming the Wild	Robert F. Hill	Rod La Rocque, Maxine Doyle, Barbara Pepper	Comedy crime	Independent
Tango	Phil Rosen	Marian Nixon, Chick Chandler, Franklin Pangborn	Drama	Chesterfield
Tarzan Escapes	Richard Thorpe, John Farrow	Maureen O'Sullivan, Johnny Weissmuller, John Buckler	Drama, Adventure	MGM
A Tenderfoot Goes West	Maurice G. O'Neill	Jack La Rue, Russell Gleason, Virginia Carroll	Western comedy	Independent
The Texas Rangers	King Vidor	Fred MacMurray, Jean Parker, Jack Oakie	Western	Paramount
Thank You, Jeeves!	Arthur Greville Collins	Arthur Treacher, Virginia Field, David Niven	Comedy	20th Century Fox
That Girl from Paris	Leigh Jason	Lily Pons, Gene Raymond, Lucille Ball	Comedy, Musical	RKO
Theodora Goes Wild	Richard Boleslawski	Irene Dunne, Melvyn Douglas, Thurston Hall	Comedy	Columbia
These Three	William Wyler	Miriam Hopkins, Merle Oberon, Joel McCrea	Drama	United Artists
They Met in a Taxi	Alfred E. Green	Fay Wray, Chester Morris, Raymond Walburn	Comedy	Columbia
Thirteen Hours by Air	Mitchell Leisen	Fred MacMurray, Joan Bennett, ZaSu Pitts	Drama	Paramount
Three Cheers for Love	Ray McCarey	Eleanore Whitney, Robert Cummings, William Frawley	Musical	Paramount
Three Godfathers	Richard Boleslawski	Chester Morris, Walter Brennan, Irene Hervey	Western	MGM
Three Live Ghosts	H. Bruce Humberstone	Richard Arlen, Beryl Mercer, Claud Allister	Comedy	MGM
Three Married Men	Edward Buzzell	Lynne Overman, Roscoe Karns, Mary Brian	Comedy	Paramount
Three Men on a Horse	Mervyn LeRoy	Frank McHugh, Joan Blondell, Guy Kibbee	Comedy	Warner Bros.
The Three Mesquiteers	Ray Taylor	Robert Livingston, Ray Corrigan, Kay Hughes	Western	Republic
Three of a Kind	Phil Rosen	Evalyn Knapp, Chick Chandler, Berton Churchill	Comedy	Chesterfield
Three on the Trail	Howard Bretherton	William Boyd, Muriel Evans, Onslow Stevens	Western	Paramount
Three Smart Girls	Henry Koster	Deanna Durbin, Binnie Barnes, Ray Milland	Musical	Universal. Best Picture nominee
The Three Wise Guys	George B. Seitz	Robert Young, Betty Furness, Bruce Cabot	Drama	MGM
Ticket to Paradise	Aubrey Scotto	Roger Pryor, Wendy Barrie, Claude Gillingwater	Drama	Republic
Till We Meet Again	Robert Florey	Herbert Marshall, Gertrude Michael, Lionel Atwill	Drama, War	Paramount
Times Square Playboy	William C. McGann	Gene Lockhart, Warren William, June Travis	Comedy	Warner Bros.
Timothy's Quest	Charles Barton	Eleanore Whitney, Tom Keene, Dickie Moore	Comedy	Paramount
To Mary With Love	John Cromwell	Myrna Loy, Warner Baxter, Claire Trevor	Drama	20th Century Fox
Too Many Parents	Robert F. McGowan	Frances Farmer, Lester Matthews, Anne Grey	Comedy	Paramount
Too Much Beef	Robert F. Hill	Rex Bell, Forrest Taylor, Lloyd Ingraham	Western	Grand National
Tough Guy	Chester Franklin	Jackie Cooper, Joseph Calleia, Jean Hersholt	Action	MGM
Trail Dust	Nate Watt	William Boyd, James Ellison, Gwynne Shipman	Western	Paramount
The Trail of the Lonesome Pine	Henry Hathaway	Sylvia Sidney, Fred MacMurray, Henry Fonda	Romance	Paramount
Trailin' West	Noel M. Smith	Dick Foran, Paula Stone, Bill Elliott	Western	Warner Bros.
The Traitor	Sam Newfield	Tim McCoy, Frances Grant, Pedro Regas	Western	Independent
Trapped by Television	Del Lord	Mary Astor, Lyle Talbot, Joyce Compton	Drama	Columbia
Treachery Rides the Range	Frank McDonald	Dick Foran, Paula Stone, Monte Blue	Western	Warner Bros.
Trouble for Two	J. Walter Ruben	Robert Montgomery, Rosalind Russell, Frank Morgan, Reginald Owen	Comedy	MGM
Tugboat Princess	David Selman	Walter C. Kelly, Valerie Hobson, Edith Fellows	Drama	Columbia
Tundra	Norman Dawn	Merrill McCormick, Frank Baker, Earl Dwire	Adventure	Independent
Two Against the World	William C. McGann	Humphrey Bogart, Beverly Roberts, Claire Dodd	Drama	Warner Bros.
Two-Fisted Gentleman	Gordon Wiles	James Dunn, June Clayworth, Muriel Evans	Sports drama	Columbia
Two in a Crowd	Alfred E. Green	Joan Bennett, Joel McCrea, Elisha Cook Jr.	Comedy	Universal
Two in Revolt	Glenn Tryon	John Arledge, Louise Latimer, Moroni Olsen	Drama	RKO
Two in the Dark	Benjamin Stoloff	Walter Abel, Margot Grahame, Wallace Ford	Mystery	RKO
Two Minutes to Play	Robert F. Hill	Bruce Bennett, Edward Nugent, Betty Compson	Sports	Independent
Under Two Flags	Frank Lloyd	Ronald Colman, Claudette Colbert, Victor McLaglen, Rosalind Russell	Adventure	20th Century Fox
Under Your Spell	Otto Preminger	Lawrence Tibbett, Wendy Barrie, Berton Churchill	Musical comedy	20th Century Fox
Undercover Man	Albert Ray	Johnny Mack Brown, Suzanne Kaaren, Ted Adams	Western	Republic
The Unknown Ranger	Spencer Gordon Bennet	Walter Miller, Bud Osborne, Robert Allen	Western	Columbia
The Unguarded Hour	Sam Wood	Loretta Young, Franchot Tone, Roland Young	Drama	MGM

== V-Z ==
Title	Director	Cast	Genre	Notes
Valiant Is the Word for Carrie	Wesley Ruggles	Gladys George, Arline Judge, John Howard	Drama	Paramount
Valley of the Lawless	Robert North Bradbury	Johnny Mack Brown, Joyce Compton, George "Gabby" Hayes	Western	Independent
Vengeance of Rannah	Bernard B. Ray	Bob Custer, Victoria Vinton, John Elliott	Western	Independent
The Voice of Bugle Ann	Richard Thorpe	Lionel Barrymore, Maureen O'Sullivan, Eric Linden	Drama	MGM
The Walking Dead	Michael Curtiz	Boris Karloff, Ricardo Cortez, Edmund Gwenn	Science fiction	Warner Bros.
Walking on Air	Joseph Santley	Ann Sothern, Gene Raymond, Jessie Ralph	Comedy, Musical	RKO
Wanted! Jane Turner	Edward Killy	Ann Preston, Lee Tracy, John McGuire	Drama, Crime	RKO
We Went to College	Joseph Santley	Charles Butterworth, Walter Abel, Una Merkel	Comedy	MGM
Wedding Present	Richard Wallace	Cary Grant, Joan Bennett, Conrad Nagel	Drama	Paramount
We're in the Legion Now!	Crane Wilbur	Reginald Denny, Esther Ralston, Eleanor Hunt	Adventure	Grand National
West of Nevada	Robert F. Hill	Rex Bell, Joan Barclay, Al St. John	Western	Independent
What Becomes of the Children?	Walter Shumway	Joan Marsh, Robert Frazer, Natalie Moorhead	Drama	Independent
The White Angel	William Dieterle	Kay Francis, Ian Hunter, Donald Crisp	Historical	Warner Bros.
White Fang	David Butler	Michael Whalen, Jean Muir, Slim Summerville	Drama	20th Century Fox
White Hunter	Irving Cummings	Warner Baxter, June Lang, Gail Patrick, Wilfrid Lawson	Adventure	20th Century Fox
White Legion	Karl Brown	Ian Keith, Tala Birell, Suzanne Kaaren	Drama	Grand National
Wife vs. Secretary	Clarence Brown	Clark Gable, Myrna Loy, Jean Harlow	Comedy	MGM
The Widow from Monte Carlo	Arthur Greville Collins	Dolores del Río, Warren William, Colin Clive	Comedy	Warner Bros.
Wild Brian Kent	Howard Bretherton	Ralph Bellamy, Mae Clarke, Helen Lowell	Drama	20th Century Fox
Wildcat Trooper	Elmer Clifton	Kermit Maynard, Hobart Bosworth, Lois Wilde	Western	Independent
Wild Horse Round-Up	Alan James	Kermit Maynard, Beth Marion, John Merton	Western	Independent
Winds of the Wasteland	Mack V. Wright	John Wayne, Phyllis Fraser, Lane Chandler	Western	Republic
Winterset	Alfred Santell	Burgess Meredith, Margo, Eduardo Ciannelli	Drama	RKO
With Love and Kisses	Leslie Goodwins	Pinky Tomlin, Toby Wing, Kane Richmond	Musical	Independent
Without Orders	Lew Landers	Sally Eilers, Robert Armstrong, Charley Grapewin	Drama	RKO
The Witness Chair	George Nicholls Jr.	Ann Harding, Walter Abel, Douglass Dumbrille	Drama	RKO
Wives Never Know	Elliott Nugent	Charlie Ruggles, Mary Boland, Adolphe Menjou	Comedy	Paramount
Wolves of the Sea	Elmer Clifton	Hobart Bosworth, Jean Carmen, Warner Richmond	Adventure	Independent
A Woman Rebels	Mark Sandrich	Katharine Hepburn, Herbert Marshall, Elizabeth Allan	Drama	RKO
Woman Trap	Harold Young	Gertrude Michael, George Murphy, Akim Tamiroff	Drama	Paramount
Women Are Trouble	Errol Taggart	Stuart Erwin, Florence Rice, Paul Kelly	Crime	MGM
Yellow Cargo	Crane Wilbur	Conrad Nagel, Vince Barnett, Eleanor Hunt	Drama	Grand National
Yellow Dust	Wallace Fox	Richard Dix, Leila Hyams, Moroni Olsen	Western	RKO
Yellowstone	Arthur Lubin	Judith Barrett, Henry Hunter, Alan Hale	Western	Universal
Yiddle with His Fiddle	Joseph Green	Molly Picon, Leon Liebgold	Musical	Independent. Yiddish
You May Be Next	Albert S. Rogell	Ann Sothern, Lloyd Nolan, Douglass Dumbrille	Crime	Columbia
Yours for the Asking	Alexander Hall	George Raft, Ida Lupino, Dolores Costello	Comedy	Paramount

== Documentaries ==
Title	Director	Cast	Genre	Notes
Beyond the Caribbean	André Roosevelt, Ewing Scott	André Roosevelt, Carol Jeffries	Drama, Adventure	

== Note ==
Although it was released at the end of 1935 and appears on the List of American films of 1935, A Tale in Two Cities was one of ten films competing for the Academy Award for Best Picture of 1936 at the 9th Academy Awards on March 4, 1937.

== See also ==
- 1936 in the United States
