= The Laramie Kid =

1935 film directed by Harry S. Webb

- Directed by: Harry S. Webb
- Written by: C.C. Church; Carl Krusada
- Produced by: Bernard B. Ray; Harry S. Webb
- Starring: Tom Tyler; Alberta Vaughn; Al Ferguson
- Cinematography: Pliny Goodfriend; J. Henry Kruse
- Edited by: Fred Bain
- Production company: Reliable Pictures
- Distributed by: Reliable Pictures
- Release date: June 1, 1935
- Running time: 57 minutes
- Country: United States
- Language: English

The Laramie Kid is a 1935 American Western film directed by Harry S. Webb and starring Tom Tyler, Alberta Vaughn in her penultimate film and Al Ferguson.

== Plot ==
Tom Talbot has earned a large amount of money in breaking horses. Hoping to double his money he loses it by gambling and returns in shame to his fiancé Peggy. Mistakenly thought a bank robber, Tom lets Peggy's father claim the reward. Tom goes to a road gang in order to identify and bring to justice the real bank robbers.

== Cast ==
- Tom Tyler as Tom Talbot
- Alberta Vaughn as Peggy Bland
- Al Ferguson as Jim Morley
- Murdock MacQuarrie as Dad Bland
- George Chesebro as Ed Larkin
- 'Snub' Pollard as Convict Shorty
- Steve Clark as Sheriff

== Bibliography ==
- Pitts, Michael R. Poverty Row Studios, 1929–1940: An Illustrated History of 55 Independent Film Companies, with a Filmography for Each. McFarland & Company, 2005.
