= Trigger Tom =

1935 film

- Directed by: Harry S. Webb
- Written by: George Cory Franklin; Tom Gibson
- Produced by: Bernard B. Ray; Harry S. Webb
- Starring: Tom Tyler; Al St. John; Bernadene Hayes
- Cinematography: Pliny Goodfriend
- Edited by: William Austin
- Production company: Reliable Pictures
- Distributed by: Reliable Pictures
- Release date: December 15, 1935
- Running time: 57 minutes
- Country: United States
- Language: English

Trigger Tom is a 1935 American Western film directed by Harry S. Webb and starring Tom Tyler, Al St. John and Bernadene Hayes.

== Cast ==
- Tom Tyler as Tom Hunter
- Al St. John as Stub Macey
- William Gould as Mose Jeckyl
- John Elliott as Nord Jergenson
- Bernadene Hayes as Dorothy Jergenson
- Bud Osborne as Scarface
- Lloyd Ingraham as Pop Slater
- Hal Taliaferro as Sam Slater

== Bibliography ==
- Pitts, Michael R. Poverty Row Studios, 1929–1940: An Illustrated History of 55 Independent Film Companies, with a Filmography for Each. McFarland & Company, 2005.
