= Never Too Late (1935 film) =

1935 American crime film

- German poster
- Directed by: Bernard B. Ray
- Written by: Bennett Cohen; Jack Natteford
- Produced by: Harry S. Webb
- Starring: Richard Talmadge; Thelma White; Robert Frazer
- Cinematography: Pliny Goodfriend
- Edited by: Frank Atkinson
- Production company: Reliable Pictures
- Distributed by: Reliable Pictures
- Release date: November 27, 1935
- Running time: 53 minutes
- Country: United States
- Language: English

Never Too Late is a 1935 American crime film directed by Bernard B. Ray and stars Richard Talmadge, Thelma White and Robert Frazer.

== Cast ==
- Richard Talmadge as Det. Dick Manning
- Thelma White as Helen Lloyd
- Robert Frazer as Commissioner George Hartley
- Mildred Harris as Marie Lloyd Hartley
- Vera Lewis as Mother Hartley
- Robert Walker as Matt Dunning - Henchman bidding at auction
- George Chesebro as Dude Hannigan - Second Henchman At Auction
- Bull Montana as Monte, an escaped convict
- Paul Ellis as Lavelle, the jewel thief
- Lloyd Ingraham as Chief of Detectives Winter

== Bibliography ==
- Pitts, Michael R. Poverty Row Studios, 1929–1940: An Illustrated History of 55 Independent Film Companies, with a Filmography for Each. McFarland & Company, 2005.
