= Rio Rattler =

1935 film by Bernard B. Ray

- Theatrical release poster
- Directed by: Bernard B. Ray (as Franklin Shamray)
- Written by: Bennett Cohen (story); Carl Krusada (screenplay)
- Produced by: Bernard B. Ray; Harry S. Webb (associate producer)
- Starring: Tom Tyler; Eddie Gribbon; Marion Shilling
- Cinematography: Pliny Goodfriend
- Edited by: William Austin (as Bill Austin)
- Production company: Reliable Pictures
- Release date: 1935
- Running time: 55 minutes
- Country: United States
- Language: English

Rio Rattler is a 1935 American Western film directed by Bernard B. Ray.

== Plot summary ==
A dying Marshal gives his identification papers to Tom. After Tom arrives in town, the papers drop and are found during a fight so Tom decides to assume the Marshal's identity. Mason, the chief, now sends Rattler, the killer of the Marshal, to also kill Tom. But when he overhears Tom is a fake, they change their plans and now go to arrest Tom for the murder of the Marshal.

== Cast ==
- Tom Tyler as Tom Denton
- Eddie Gribbon as Soapy
- Marion Shilling as Mary Adams
- William Gould as Banker Mason
- Tom London as Ranger Bob Adams
- Slim Whitaker as "Rattler" Brown
- Lafe McKee as "Pop" - Hotel owner
- Ace Cain as Henchman Sam Hall
- Frank Ellis as Tonto (Man owing Pop $25)
