= Rawhide Mail =

1934 film directed by Bernard B. Ray

- Directed by: Bernard B. Ray
- Written by: Rose Gordon; Bennett Cohen; Betty Burbridge
- Produced by: Bernard B. Ray; Harry S. Webb
- Starring: Jack Perrin; Nelson McDowell; Chris-Pin Martin
- Cinematography: J. Henry Kruse
- Edited by: Fred Bain
- Production company: Reliable Pictures
- Distributed by: Reliable Pictures
- Release date: June 8, 1934
- Running time: 59 minutes
- Country: United States
- Language: English

Rawhide Mail is a 1934 American Western film directed by Bernard B. Ray and starring Jack Perrin, Nelson McDowell and Chris-Pin Martin.

== Cast ==
- Jack Perrin as Jack Reed
- Nelson McDowell as Judge
- Chris-Pin Martin as Pedro Esteban
- Lillian Gilmore as Nora Hastings
- Richard Cramer as Hal Drummond
- Lafe McKee as Sheriff
- George Chesebro as Porky - Henchman
- Jimmy Aubrey as Mike - Henchman
- Robert Walker as Brown - the Buyer
- Lew Meehan as Tim - Bartender

== Bibliography ==
- Pitts, Michael R. Poverty Row Studios, 1929–1940: An Illustrated History of 55 Independent Film Companies, with a Filmography for Each. McFarland & Company, 2005.
