= Midnight Phantom =

1935 film by Bernard B. Ray

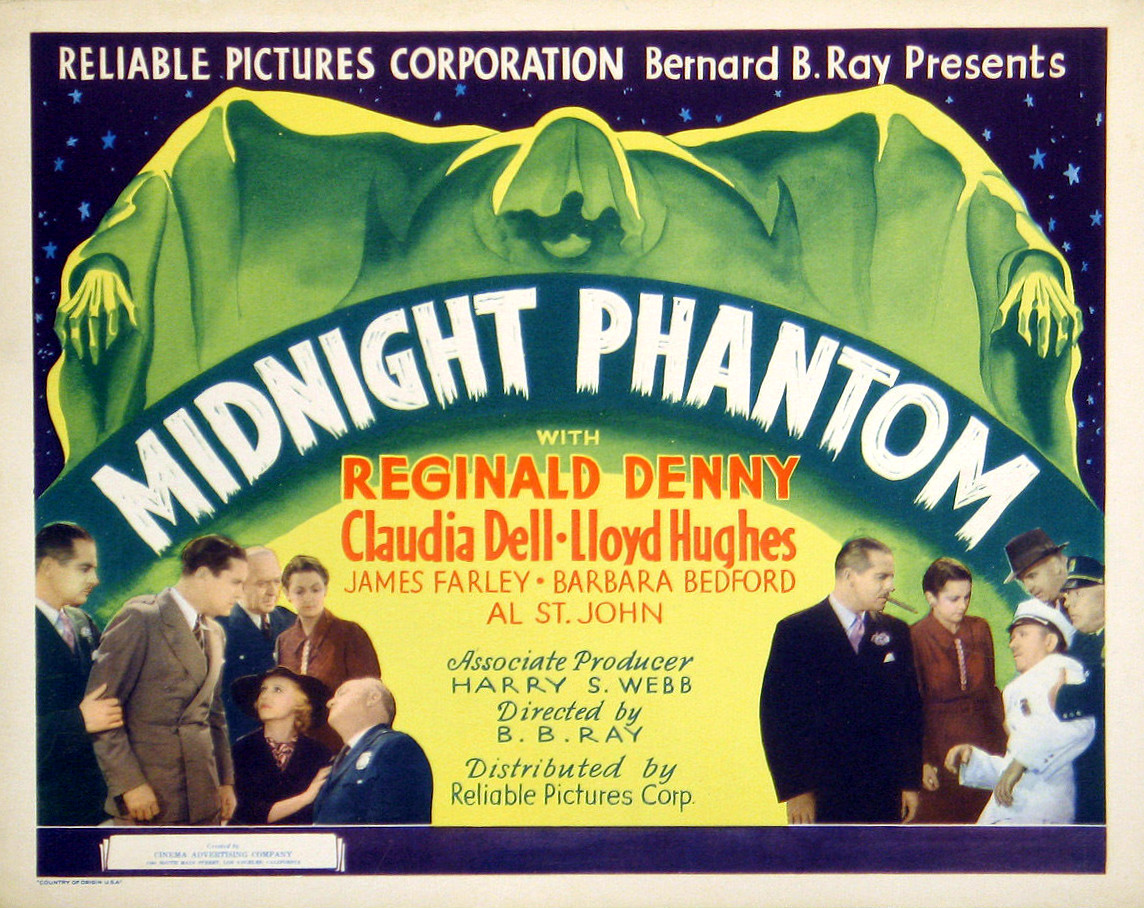
- Lobby card
- Directed by: Bernard B. Ray
- Written by: John T. Neville (story and screenplay)
- Produced by: Harry S. Webb (associate producer); Bernard B. Ray (producer)
- Starring: See below
- Cinematography: Pliny Goodfriend
- Edited by: Arthur Hilton
- Production company: Reliable Pictures
- Distributed by: Reliable Pictures
- Release date: November 27, 1935
- Running time: 63 minutes
- Country: United States
- Language: English

Midnight Phantom is a 1935 American film directed by Bernard B. Ray.

== Plot ==
Police Chief James A. Sullivan is in his office berating several people under his command who he feels are doing a less than top notch job. His waiting room is full of other characters waiting their turn to go in and receive their own reprimand.

His secretary, Kathleen Ryan, sends them in one by one except when Lieutenant Dan Burke arrives. He goes in unannounced because he is the Chief's daughter's boyfriend and has come to ask the Chief's blessing for their engagement. The Chief mentions that there was another suitor, Prof. David Graham, a noted criminologist, but the Chief is glad his daughter Claudia chose Dan.

The scolding of other station employees and officers continues and all of them leave the office in a very bad mood and with visible anger towards the Chief.

There is a car chase involving criminals and the police. In the shootout, all the criminals die but one of them turns out to be Dan's brother who apologizes to his older brother before he dies.

Chief Sullivan is now opposed to Dan's marriage to Claudia, mostly because Dan hadn't disclosed to her that the robber shot and killed was his younger brother. Dan vows to marry Claudia in spite of his refusal.

A demonstration is arranged in which Prof. Graham demonstrates his knowledge of criminal traits and characteristics. However, when the demonstration is over, the Chief, who was sitting in the front row, is found to be dead, possibly by a poison dart.

Nobody is allowed to leave the room and a few minutes later, another murder occurs.

Dan approaches Prof. Graham and the lights go out. When they are turned back on, Dan is on the floor, dead. Prof. Graham establishes that the killer was Dan and his motive was the Chief's refusal to allow the wedding to proceed.

Dan, who was just pretending to be dead, gets up and points a gun at Prof. Graham proving it was he who murdered the Chief, not Dan. Graham confesses and is arrested.

Dan and Claudia go out on a picnic and she is sad about all the recent events, especially about the fact that Graham had been executed for his crime. She is comforted knowing she has married Dan.

== Cast ==
- Reginald Denny as Prof. David Graham
- Claudia Dell as Diana Sullivan (misspelled Diane Sullivan in opening credits)
- Lloyd Hughes as Police Lt. Dan Burke
- Jim Farley as Police Chief James A. Sullivan
- Barbara Bedford as Kathleen Ryan
- Mary Foy as Mary Ryan
- John Elliott as Capt. Bill Withers
- Francis Sayles as Police Surgeon Kelly
- Al St. John as Radio Officer Jones
- Henry Roquemore as Dr. McNeil
- Lee Prather as Police Capt. Perkins
- Robert Walker as Police Capt. Jim Phillips
- Jack Kenny as Police Inspector Silverstein
