= The Fighting Pilot =

1935 film directed by Noel M. Smith

- Film poster
- Directed by: Noel M. Smith
- Written by: Rudolph Cusumano
- Produced by: Bernard B. Ray; Harry S. Webb
- Starring: Richard Talmadge; Gertrude Messinger; Robert Frazer
- Cinematography: Frank Bender; Reginald Lyons
- Edited by: Holbrook N. Todd
- Music by: Robert Pritchard
- Production company: Reliable Pictures Corporation
- Distributed by: State Rights; Ajax Pictures Corporation
- Release date: February 14, 1935
- Running time: 56 minutes
- Country: United States
- Language: English

The Fighting Pilot (aka Fighting Pilot) is a 1935 American action film directed by Noel M. Smith and starring Richard Talmadge, Gertrude Messinger and Robert Frazer. When an inventor develops a new type of aircraft, a crooked businessman attempts to steals the aircraft and its blueprints. The company test pilot, who is the boyfriend of the inventor's daughter, foil the criminals.

== Plot ==
In Washington D.C., Mr. Jones (Rafael Storm) receives a telegram from Los Angeles asking him to secure rights to a newly designed aircraft from inventor F. S. Reynolds (William Humphrey). Later that day, Cardigan (Robert Frazer), a gangster, lies to Jones that Reynolds is not really interested in his offer. Cardigan tries unsuccessfully to buy the aircraft and its plans from Reynolds. Test pilot Hal Foster (Richard Talmadge) and his girl friend, Reynolds' daughter Jean (Gertrude Messinger), arrive and Hal throws Cardigan out.

Afterwards, Hal test flies the new aircraft and as he and Reynolds discuss its problems, Cardigan's henchmen arrive and steal the aircraft and the plans. Hal follows their car on his motorcycle and Berty ( Eddie Davis), Hal's goofy friend, follows in a car. Hal catches up with the henchmen and they engage in a brawl.

After Berty arrives, he and Hal go to Cardigan's Chinatown home, but Cardigan's Chinese butler refuses them admittance. As Cardigan phones Jones to let him know that the aircraft is secure at an abandoned desert airfield, Hal and Berty break into his headquarters and overhear the location of the aircraft. Hal is captured, but later Berty, disguised as a Chinese servant, releases Hal and they use one of Reynolds' aircraft to fly to the desert airstrip.

A government agent, who is also a pilot, arrives at Reynolds' headquarters, searching for Cardigan, and Jean guides him to the secret airfield. Cardigan's henchmen see Hal's approaching aircraft and try to chase him down, but he jumps from his aircraft into theirs and upon subduing them, lands the aircraft. Jean and the agent arrive. The agent arrests Cardigan and his men, and Jean and Hal embrace.

== Cast ==
- Richard Talmadge as Hal Foster
- Gertrude Messinger as Jean Reynolds
- Robert Frazer as Cardigan
- Eddie Davis as Berty
- Victor Metzetti as Toughy (Note: Victor Metzetti was Richard Talmadge's brother, who also started as a circus performer.)
- William Humphrey as Mr. Reynolds
- Rafael Storm as Jones
- Jack Cheatham as Barnes

== Production ==
The Fighting Pilot was a low-budget affair that featured the stunts rather than plot or story. The star, Richard Talmadge, made a career of doing action films, and never rose far from the B-movie format. (Note: German-born Richard Talmadge, who first was a circus performer, began his film career as a stunt double, and was well-suited for the "rough-and-tumble" of action films.)

The aircraft used in The Fighting Pilot, were:

- Kinner SportsterK c/n 150, NC14237
- Cycloplane C-1 c/n 3, NC12202
- Stearman C3B c/n 235, NC8820
- Travel Air 2000 c/n 322, NC3948
- Alexander EaglerockA1 c/n 752, NC6375

== Reception ==
Reviewer Hal Erickson in Allmovie.com, stressed the stunts in The Fighting Pilot was a highlight.
