= Caryl of the Mountains =

1936 film by Bernard B. Ray

- Original film poster
- Directed by: Bernard B. Ray
- Written by: James Oliver Curwood (story); Tom Gibson (dialogue and continuity)
- Produced by: Bernard B. Ray (producer); Harry S. Webb (associate producer)
- Cinematography: William Hyer
- Edited by: Frederick Bain
- Distributed by: Reliable Pictures
- Release date: March 27, 1936
- Running time: 68 minutes
- Country: United States
- Language: English

Caryl of the Mountains is a 1936 American northern film directed by Bernard B. Ray. It was made for Reliable Pictures and shot at Big Bear Lake, California.

The film is also known as Get That Girl in the United Kingdom.

== Plot ==
Somewhere in the United States Enos Colvin schemes to defraud his investors and abscond with the assets of his company that are in the form of bonds. His secretary Caryl decides to take the bonds herself and post them to her Uncle Jean living in the Canadian woods. Discovering what Caryl has done and knowing where the bonds have been posted Enos goes himself to Canada to get the bonds from Uncle Jean who has hidden them in a secret location in his hearth. A struggle ensues and Jean is murdered and his dog Rinty wounded by Enos' revolver.

Making his way to the local Royal Canadian Mounted Police, Rinty is nursed back to health until he is able to bring Enos to justice.

== Cast ==
- Rin Tin Tin, Jr. as Rinty
- Ralph Bushman billed as Francis X. Bushman Jr. as RCMP Sergeant Brad Sheridan
- Lois Wilde as Caryl Foray
- Josef Swickard as Jean Foray
- Earl Dwire as RCMP Inspector Bradshaw
- Robert Walker as Enos Colvin
- George Chesebro as RCMP Constable Jim O'Brien
- Ray Henderson as RCMP Constable Gary
- Steve Clark as RCMP Captain Edwards

Artie Ortego appears uncredited as Indian Joe.
