= Pinto Rustlers =

1936 film directed by Harry S. Webb

- Directed by: Harry S. Webb
- Written by: Robert Emmett Tansey
- Produced by: Bernard B. Ray; Harry S. Webb
- Starring: Tom Tyler; George Walsh; Al St. John
- Cinematography: William Hyer
- Edited by: Fred Bain
- Production company: Reliable Pictures
- Distributed by: Reliable Pictures
- Release date: May 14, 1936
- Running time: 56 minutes
- Country: United States
- Language: English

Pinto Rustlers is a 1936 American Western film directed by Harry S. Webb and starring Tom Tyler, George Walsh and Al St. John.

== Plot ==
A young cowboy's parents are killed by a gang of rustlers. He seeks revenge and infiltrates the gang in order to gain enough evidence to hang them.

== Cast ==
- Tom Tyler as Tom Evans posing as Tom Dawson
- George Walsh as Nick Furnicky
- Al St. John as Mack
- Marie Burton as Ann Walton
- Earl Dwire as Bud Walton
- William Gould as Inspector
- George Chesebro as Henchman Spade
- Roger Williams as Deputy posing as Lugo
- Bud Osborne as Henchman Buck
- Murdock MacQuarrie as Ed Walton
- Slim Whitaker as Sheriff

== Bibliography ==
- Pitts, Michael R. Poverty Row Studios, 1929–1940: An Illustrated History of 55 Independent Film Companies, with a Filmography for Each. McFarland & Company, 2005.
