= Fast Bullets =

1936 film directed by Harry S. Webb

- Original film poster
- Directed by: Harry S. Webb (as Henrí Samuels)
- Written by: Jay J. Bryan; Carl Krusada; Rose Gordon
- Produced by: Bernard B. Ray; Harry S. Webb
- Starring: Tom Tyler; Rex Lease; Margaret Nearing
- Cinematography: Pliny Goodfriend
- Edited by: Fred Bain
- Production company: Reliable Pictures
- Distributed by: Reliable Pictures
- Release date: February 21, 1936
- Running time: 58 minutes
- Country: United States
- Language: English

Fast Bullets is a 1936 American Western film directed by Harry S. Webb and starring Tom Tyler, Rex Lease and Margaret Nearing. It was the 14th of Tom Tyler's 18 Westerns for Reliable Pictures.

== Plot ==
The Texas Rangers are hot on the trail of the Travis gang that have killed two Rangers. Ranger Sgt. Tom Milton apprehends two members of the gang, then turning them over to his Ranger companion, chases after the third, young Jimmy. Instead of shooting Jimmy, Tom talks him into going on the straight and narrow by his helping Tom infiltrate the Travis gang who are smuggling explosives.

One of the outlaws Tom arrested escapes and informs Travis that Tom is actually a Texas Ranger. Travis uses Tom to ambush a column of Rangers.

== Cast ==
- Tom Tyler as Sgt. Tom Milton
- Rex Lease as Jimmy
- Margaret Nearing as Joan
- Al Bridge as Travis
- William Gould as Captain Drummond
- Robert Walker as Frank
- Jimmy Aubrey as Jake
- Slim Whitaker as Pat
- Charles King as Bill
- George Chesebro as Saloon tough

== Production ==
Filming of Fast Bullets began in early November, 1934.

== Bibliography ==
- Pitts, Michael R. Poverty Row Studios, 1929–1940: An Illustrated History of 55 Independent Film Companies, with a Filmography for Each. McFarland & Company, 2005.
