= They Met in a Taxi =

1936 film by Alfred E. Green

- Directed by: Alfred E. Green
- Written by: Octavus Roy Cohen; Howard J. Green
- Produced by: Howard J. Green
- Starring: Chester Morris; Fay Wray; Raymond Walburn
- Cinematography: James Van Trees
- Edited by: Gene Milford
- Music by: Morris Stoloff
- Production company: Columbia Pictures
- Distributed by: Columbia Pictures
- Release date: September 9, 1936
- Running time: 70 minutes
- Country: United States
- Language: English

They Met in a Taxi is a 1936 American comedy film directed by Alfred E. Green and starring Chester Morris, Fay Wray and Raymond Walburn. It was produced and distributed by Columbia Pictures.

== Plot ==
Taxicab driver Jimmy Donlin (Chester Morris) is hailed by Mary Trenton (Fay Wray), a fashion-store model who is falsely accused of stealing a string of valuable beads while modeling a wedding gown for a socialite bride-to-be. With the aid of his friends Roger Clifton (Raymond Walburn) and pickpocket "Fingers" Garrison (Lionel Stander), he sets out to prove Mary's innocence.

== Cast ==
- Chester Morris as Jimmy Donlin
- Fay Wray as Mary Trenton
- Raymond Walburn as Mr. Roger Clifton
- Lionel Stander as Fingers Garrison
- Henry Mollison as Mr. Arnold Stewart
- Kenneth Harlan as Mr. Andrews
- Sam Ash as Elevator Man
- Ward Bond as Policeman
- Al Bridge as Detective
- Mary Lou Dix as Bit Role
- James Flavin as Policeman
- Sam Harris as Passerby
- Edward LeSaint as Justice of the Peace
- Frank Melton as Specks Callahan
- Martha Merrill as Edna Fletcher
- C.L. Sherwood as Coffee John
- Rafael Storm as Count Petoski

== Bibliography ==
- Roy Kinnard & Tony Crnkovich. The Films of Fay Wray. McFarland, 2005.
