= It's All in Your Mind (film) =

- Reissue Poster
- Directed by: Bernard B. Ray
- Written by: Bernard B. Ray
- Produced by: Bernard B. Ray; Harry S. Webb
- Starring: Byron Foulger; Constance Bergen; Lynton Brent
- Cinematography: Pliny Goodfriend
- Edited by: Fred Bain
- Music by: Modest Altschuler
- Production company: Metropolitan Pictures
- Release date: March 29, 1938
- Running time: 63 minutes
- Country: United States
- Language: English

It's All in Your Mind is a 1938 American drama film directed by Bernard B. Ray and starring Byron Foulger, Constance Bergen and Lynton Brent.

It was released as an exploitation movie outside the usual mainstream channels, and it played theaters catering to moviegoers seeking sensationalized fare. Byron Foulger, then an obscure supporting actor playing bit parts, played the leading role of a henpecked husband who resolves to sample the fast life of nightclubs and good-time girls. He does, but he's haunted by visions of the seamy side of life (allowing writer-producer-director Bernard B. Ray to include semi-nudity and suggestive situations). It's All in Your Mind was re-released in later years as Fools of Desire, the title hinting at the spicy content.

Foulger was so convincing as the milquetoast that other studios began casting him regularly, and he was typecast as mild-mannered worrywarts for the next 30 years.

== Cast ==
- Byron Foulger as Wilbur Crane
- Constance Bergen as Dorothy
- Lynton Brent as Danny
- Betty Roadman as Martha Crane

== Bibliography ==
- McCarty, Clifford. Film Composers in America: A Filmography, 1911-1970. Oxford University Press, 2000.
