= Bernard B. Ray =

American film director (1895–1964)

- Born: Benjamin Shamrayevsky; November 18, 1895; Moscow, Russian Empire
- Died: December 10, 1964 (aged 69); Los Angeles, California, United States
- Other name: Franklin Shamray (pseudonym)
- Occupations: Producer, Director
- Years active: 1926-1960 (film)

Bernard Benny Ray (born Benjamin Shamrayevsky, November 18, 1895 - December 10, 1964) was a Russian-born American film producer and director. He is closely associated with the production of low-budget B films of Poverty Row, involved with companies such as Reliable Pictures during the 1930s.

In some film credits, like Rio Rattler (1935), he has used the pseudonym "Franklin Shamray".

== Death ==
On December 10, 1964, after what appears to have been a long illness, Ray died of undisclosed causes at the Motion Picture Country Home Hospital. He was preceded in death by his wife Georgia Mae Tallant, to whom he was married between 1927 and 1958.

== Selected filmography ==
- Bitter Sweets (1928)
- Women Men Marry (1931)
- At Twelve Midnight (1933)
- Rawhide Mail (1934)
- Mystery Ranch (1934)
- Ridin' Thru (1934)
- Fighting Hero (1934)
- Terror of the Plains (1934)
- Unconquered Bandit (1935)
- The Cactus Kid (1935)
- Tracy Rides (1935)
- The Fighting Pilot (1935)
- Silent Valley (1935)
- Now or Never (1935)
- Trigger Tom (1935)
- Texas Jack (1935)
- North of Arizona (1935)
- Wolf Riders (1935)
- Kentucky Blue Streak (1935)
- Midnight Phantom (1935)
- Never Too Late (1935)
- Skull and Crown (1935)
- Loser's End (1935)
- The Test (1935)
- Born to Battle (1935)
- Coyote Trails (1935)
- The Live Wire (1935)
- Rio Rattler (1935)
- Santa Fe Bound (1936)
- Fast Bullets (1936)
- Ambush Valley (1936)
- Step on It (1936)
- I'll Name the Murderer (1936)
- Roamin' Wild (1936)
- Ridin' On (1936)
- The Speed Reporter (1936)
- The Reckless Way (1936)
- Pinto Rustlers (1936)
- The Millionaire Kid (1936)
- Caryl of the Mountains (1936)
- Vengeance of Rannah (1936)
- The Silver Trail (1937)
- Santa Fe Rides (1937)
- It's All in Your Mind (1938)
- Smoky Trails (1939)
- Fangs of the Wild (1939)
- Port of Hate (1939)
- The Pal from Texas (1939)
- Broken Strings (1940)
- Dangerous Lady (1941)
- Law of the Timber (1941)
- Too Many Women (1942)
- House of Errors (1942)
- Buffalo Bill Rides Again (1947)
- Timber Fury (1950)
- Buffalo Bill in Tomahawk Territory (1952)
- Hollywood Thrill Makers (1954)
- Spring Affair (1960)

== Bibliography ==
- Michael R. Pitts. Poverty Row Studios, 1929–1940: An Illustrated History of 55 Independent Film Companies, with a Filmography for Each. McFarland & Company, 2005.
