= Step on It (1936 film) =

1936 American crime film directed by Harry S. Webb

- Directed by: Harry S. Webb
- Written by: Harry S. Webb
- Produced by: Bernard B. Ray; Harry S. Webb
- Starring: Richard Talmadge; Lois Wilde; Roger Williams
- Cinematography: William Hyer
- Edited by: Fred Bain
- Production company: Reliable Pictures
- Distributed by: Reliable Pictures
- Release date: January 1936
- Running time: 57 minutes
- Country: United States
- Language: English

Step on It is a 1936 American crime film directed by Harry S. Webb and starring Richard Talmadge, Lois Wilde, and Roger Williams.

== Plot ==
After being kicked off the force, a former police officer single-handedly goes after a gang that is staging truck hold-ups.

== Cast ==
- Richard Talmadge as Larry Evans
- Lois Wilde as Connie Banning
- Roger Williams as Joe Burke
- George Walsh as Mack
- Eddie Davis as Frisco
- Earl Dwire as Frank Banning
- Robert Walker as Roger Simmons
- Frank Hall Crane as Doctor Greene
- Lafe McKee as Captain Bradshaw
- Fred Parker as 'Dad', Gas Station Owner
- Victor Metzetti as Henchman
- Vane Calvert as Housekeeper
- Blackie Whiteford Henchman

== Bibliography ==
- Pitts, Michael R. Poverty Row Studios, 1929–1940: An Illustrated History of 55 Independent Film Companies, with a Filmography for Each. McFarland & Company, 2005.
