= Smoky Trails =

- Theatrical release poster
- Directed by: Bernard B. Ray
- Screenplay by: George H. Plympton
- Produced by: Harry S. Webb
- Starring: Bob Steele; Jean Carmen; Murdock MacQuarrie; Bruce Dane; Carleton Young; Ted Adams
- Cinematography: Edward A. Kull
- Edited by: Fred Bain
- Production company: Metropolitan Pictures Corporation
- Distributed by: Metropolitan Pictures Corporation
- Release date: March 3, 1939
- Running time: 57 minutes
- Country: United States
- Language: English

Smoky Trails is a 1939 American Western film directed by Bernard B. Ray and written by George H. Plympton. The film stars Bob Steele, Jean Carmen, Murdock MacQuarrie, Bruce Dane, Carleton Young and Ted Adams. The film was released on March 3, 1939, by Metropolitan Pictures Corporation.

== Plot ==
Bob Archer was after his father's killer, when he finds a man in the middle of a gunfight, he helps the man escape, but the man knocks Bob out. Bob is taken to the Sheriff and arrested. Bob realizes that the man who he saved is actually his father's killer and asks to be released. Then disguises himself as a criminal and enters the gang's hideout to find that man again.

== Cast ==
- Bob Steele as Bob Archer
- Jean Carmen as Marie
- Murdock MacQuarrie as Will Archer
- Bruce Dane as Cookie
- Carleton Young as Mort
- Ted Adams as Outlaw Leader
- Frank LaRue as Sheriff
- Jimmy Aubrey as Jeff
- Bob Terry as Burke
- Frank Wayne as Sloan
