= Hollywood Thrill-Makers =

1954 film

- Directed by: Bernard B. Ray
- Written by: Janet Clark; Bernard B. Ray
- Produced by: Maurice Kosloff
- Starring: James Gleason; William Henry; Diana Darrin
- Cinematography: Elmer Dyer
- Edited by: Robert Jahns
- Music by: Gene Garf
- Production company: Kolsoff Productions
- Distributed by: Lippert Pictures
- Release date: January 14, 1954
- Running time: 53 minutes
- Country: United States
- Language: English

Hollywood Thrill Makers is a 1954 American action film directed by Bernard B. Ray and starring James Gleason, William Henry and Diana Darrin. It was distributed by Lippert Pictures. It is also known as Hollywood Stuntmen. It follows the lives of several Hollywood stuntmen.

== Cast ==
- James Gleason as Risky Russell
- William Henry as Dave Wilson
- Jean Holcombe as Joan Cummings
- James Macklin as Bill Cummings
- Diana Darrin as Marion Russell
- Robert Paquin as Cameraman
- Janet Clark as Gladys
- Jack George as Carl Von Snidenhousen - Director
- George Sherwood as Film Crew
- Fred Kohler Jr. as Film Crew
- Daine Frankel as Nancy Wilson
- Linda Heidt as Woman

== Reception ==
The Monthly Film Bulletin called it an "Ineptly made, hashed up affair."

The Los Angeles Times said "If you're interested in the antics of Hollywood stunt men, this one might interest you - but not much."
