= Roamin' Wild =

1936 film by Bernard B. Ray

- Directed by: Bernard B. Ray
- Written by: Robert Emmett Tansey (story)
- Produced by: Bernard B. Ray (producer); Harry S. Webb (associate producer)
- Starring: See below
- Cinematography: William Hyer
- Edited by: Frederick Bain
- Production company: Reliable Pictures
- Distributed by: Reliable Pictures
- Release date: April 29, 1936
- Running time: 58 minutes
- Country: United States
- Language: English

Roamin' Wild is a 1936 American Western film directed by Bernard B. Ray and starring Tom Tyler and Max Davidson. It was produced and released by the independent Reliable Pictures.

== Plot ==
Traveling peddler Abe Wineman is robbed by outlaws. Roaming cowboy Tom Barton intercedes by routing the gang and rescuing Abe. The grateful Abe becomes Tom's sidekick. They arrive in Placerville, where Tom's brother is the marshal. Tom finds a phony lawman in his brother's place. Local badman Clark is behind all the trouble, and his next target is the Madison stage line. Tom joins Mary Madison to battle Clark while looking for his missing brother.

== Cast ==
- Tom Tyler as Tom Barton
- Max Davidson as Abe Wineman
- Carol Wyndham as Mary Madison
- Al Ferguson as Clark
- George Chesebro as Henchman Tip
- Fred Parker as Dad Summers
- Slim Whitaker as Marshal Lucas
- Bud Osborne as Henchman Red
- Wally West as Jim Barton
- Earl Dwire as Jim Madison
- Lafe McKee as 'Dad' Parker
- John Elliott as Chief Inspector Reed
