= Loser's End =

1935 film

- Directed by: Bernard B. Ray
- Written by: Rose Gordon (continuity); Carl Krusada (dialogue); Harry S. Webb (writer)
- Produced by: Harry S. Webb (associate producer); Bernard B. Ray (producer)
- Starring: See below
- Cinematography: J. Henry Kruse
- Edited by: Frederick Bain
- Production company: Reliable Pictures
- Distributed by: William Steiner
- Release date: January 25, 1935
- Running time: 59 minutes (USA)
- Country: United States
- Language: English

Loser's End is a 1935 American Western film produced by Harry S. Webb for Reliable Pictures and directed by Bernard B. Ray.

== Plot summary ==
A cowboy meets up with a bandit gang. Taken captive, he is rescued by a man called Don Carlos, and together with a young woman named Lolita, they join forces to stop the gang's upcoming raid and bring them to justice.

== Cast ==
- Jack Perrin as Jack
- Tina Menard as Lolita
- Frank Rice as Amos
- William Gould as Bill Meeker
- Fern Emmett as Molly O'Hara, the Cook
- Elias Lazaroff as Don Carlos Delgardo
- Robert Walker as Henchman Joe
- Jimmy Aubrey as Henchman Dick
- Rosemary Joye as Lupe Little
