= Stampede (1936 film) =

1936 film by Ford Beebe

- Directed by: Ford Beebe
- Screenplay by: Robert Watson
- Starring: Charles Starrett
- Cinematography: William Beckway; George Meehan
- Edited by: William Austin
- Color process: Black and white
- Production companies: Central Films; Kenneth J. Bishop Productions
- Distributed by: Columbia Pictures
- Release date: November 27, 1936
- Running time: 57 minutes
- Countries: Canada; United States
- Language: English

Stampede is a 1936 Canadian-American Western film directed by Ford Beebe and starring Charles Starrett.

== Plot ==
Montana ranchers are having trouble selling their livestock, and a local buyer has his own mysterious reasons for complicating the sales. Cattle buyer Larry Carson arrives, trying to find out who murdered his brother, and his investigation worries the outlaws.

== Production ==
In the mid-1930s Canada enacted a law according to the British Cinematograph Act of 1927: if American studios wanted to distribute any of their films in Canada, they would have to accept and release a certain number of Canadian-made films. Columbia Pictures complied with this policy by sending some of its contract players and crew members to Canada, where Columbia could exert some control over the quality of the productions. Kenneth J. Bishop (1893-1941) supervised the filming at a studio in Victoria, British Columbia, but the editing and post-production work were done in California, with Bishop visiting the Columbia studio to collaborate. Columbia continued making Canadian-based productions until 1939.

Stampede was one of the earliest of these Canadian-American features, and Columbia's new cowboy star Charles Starrett was the only American actor in the cast. The screenplay was based on a Peter B. Kyne story. Although the film is distinguished by offbeat casting and unusual Canadian scenery, reviewers of the day found it no different from the usual western fare. Motion Picture Daily reported: "As westerns go, Stampede is satisfactorily replete with the proper ingredients to satisfy that audience which appreciates and enjoys this form of entertainment." Exhibitors approved of Starrett: "This star should become one of the outstanding favorites. He has looks and genuine acting ability." Starrett went on to become Columbia's most enduring cowboy star, making 131 western features through 1952.

== Cast ==
- Charles Starrett as Larry Carson
- Finis Barton as Dale Milford
- J.P. McGowan as Matt Stevens
- William Millman as John Milford (as LeStrange Millman)
- Reginald Hincks as Sheriff
- James McGrath as Henry Brooks
- Arthur Kerr as Bill Gans
- Jack Atkinson as Hodge
- Michael Heppell as Kyle

== See also ==
- Public domain film
- List of American films of 1936
- List of films in the public domain in the United States

== Bibliography ==
- Pitts, Michael R. Western Movies: A Guide to 5,105 Feature Films. McFarland, 2012.
