= The Test (1935 film) =

1935 film

- Directed by: Bernard B. Ray
- Written by: James Oliver Curwood (story); L. V. Jefferson (continuity); L. V. Jefferson (dialogue)
- Produced by: Bernard B. Ray (producer); Harry S. Webb (associate producer)
- Cinematography: J. Henry Kruse; Abe Scholtz
- Edited by: Frederick Bain
- Distributed by: Reliable Pictures
- Release date: 1935
- Running time: 59 minutes
- Country: United States
- Language: English

The Test is a 1935 American western adventure film directed by Bernard B. Ray and produced by Ray and Harry S. Webb for Reliable Pictures. It features as its hero the dog Rin Tin Tin, Jr.

== Plot ==
Fur trapper Brule Conway sets Rin Tin Tin Jr. to guard his furs. The henchmen of a rival trapper use a female dog to lure Rinty away from his post, and then proceed to steal the stash of furs. Rinty sets out to capture the thieves and return his master's furs.

== Cast ==
- Grant Withers as Brule Conway
- Grace Ford as Beth McVey
- Monte Blue as Pepite La Joie
- Lafe McKee as Dad McVey
- Artie Ortego as Henchman Black Wolf
- Jimmy Aubrey as Henchman Donovan
- Nanette the Dog as Nanette
- Rin Tin Tin, Jr. as Rinnie
