= The Millionaire Kid =

1936 film directed by Bernard B. Ray

- Directed by: Bernard B. Ray
- Written by: Blanche Church; Jack Natteford
- Produced by: Bernard B. Ray; Harry S. Webb
- Starring: Bryant Washburn; Betty Compson; Charles Delaney
- Cinematography: William Hyer
- Edited by: Frederick Bain
- Production company: Reliable Pictures
- Distributed by: Reliable Pictures
- Release date: March 14, 1936
- Running time: 59 minutes
- Country: United States
- Language: English

The Millionaire Kid is a 1936 American drama film produced and released by Reliable Pictures with former silent stars Bryant Washburn and Betty Compson in the leads and with several other familiar silent personalities in supporting roles.

== Cast ==
- Betty Compson as Gloria Neville
- Bryant Washburn as Terry Malone
- Charles Delaney as Breezy Benson
- Lois Wilde as Kitty Malone
- Bradley Metcalfe as Tommy Neville
- Creighton Hale as Thomas Neville
- Eddie Phillips as Joe Toronto
- Eddie Gribbon as Hogan
- Al St. John as Matthews
- Josef Swickard as The Tutor
- John Elliott as Yellerton
- Earl Dwire as Black
- Ed Cassidy as Red
- Arthur Thalasso as Morley
- Roger Williams as City Editor
