= Santa Fe Rides =

1937 film directed by Bernard B. Ray

- Directed by: Bernard B. Ray
- Written by: Tom Gibson; Forrest Sheldon
- Produced by: Bernard B. Ray; Harry S. Webb
- Starring: Bob Custer; Eleanor Stewart; David Sharpe
- Cinematography: Pliny Goodfriend
- Edited by: Fred Bain
- Production company: Reliable Pictures
- Distributed by: Reliable Pictures
- Release date: February 25, 1937
- Running time: 58 minutes
- Country: United States
- Language: English

Santa Fe Rides is a 1937 American Western film directed by Bernard B. Ray and starring Bob Custer, Eleanor Stewart and David Sharpe.

== Cast ==
- Bob Custer as Santa Fe Evans
- Eleanor Stewart as Carol Sheldon
- Ed Cassidy as Mr. Allen
- David Sharpe as Buddy Sheldon
- Roger Williams as Carver
- Slim Whitaker as Henchman Al Jensen
- Lafe McKee as 'Dad' Sheldon
- John Elliott as Carlton
- 'Snub' Pollard as Stubby
- Nelson McDowell as Andy

== Bibliography ==
- Pitts, Michael R. Poverty Row Studios, 1929–1940: An Illustrated History of 55 Independent Film Companies, with a Filmography for Each. McFarland & Company, 2005.
