= The Live Wire (1935 film) =

1935 film by Harry S. Webb

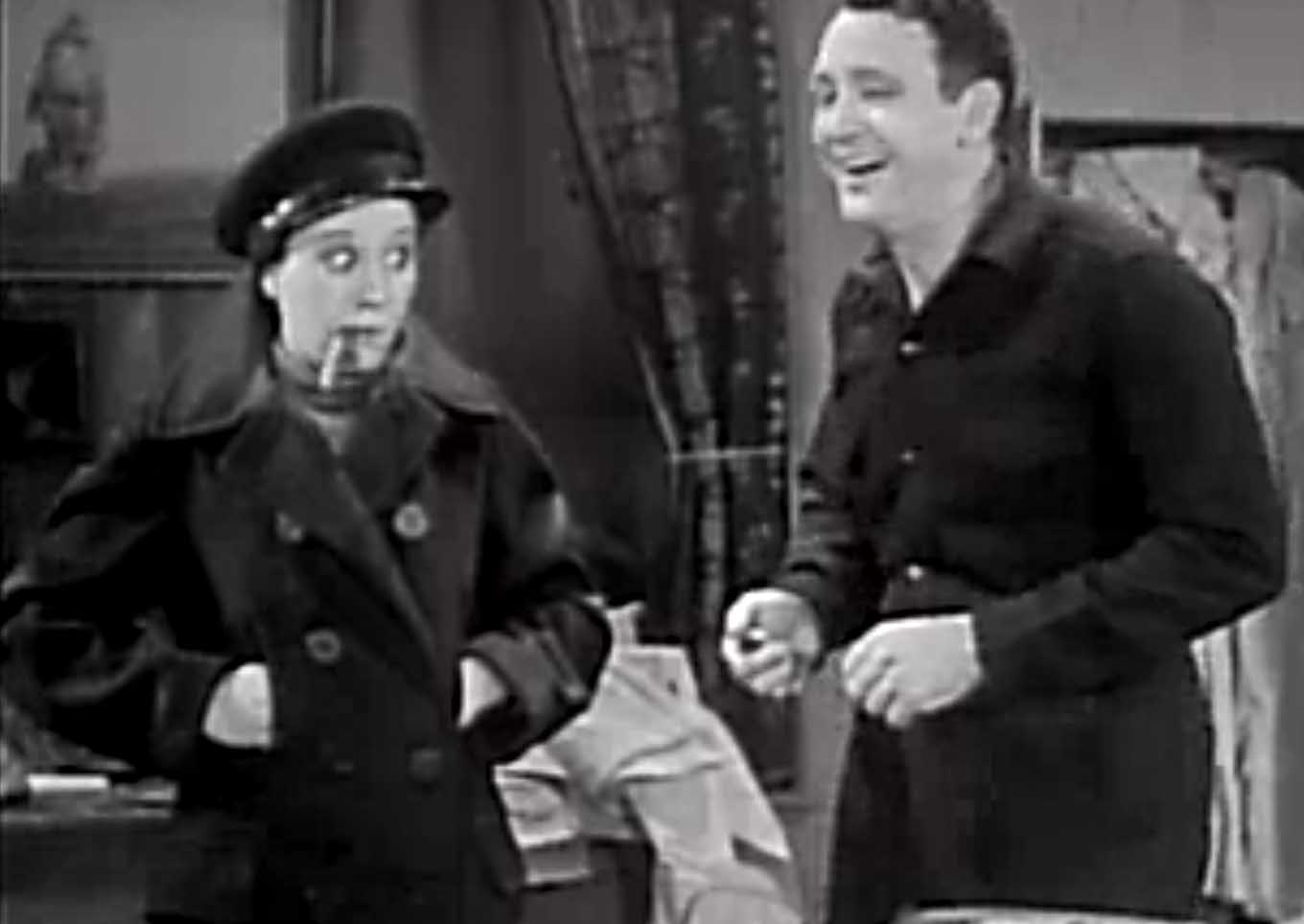
- Alberta Vaughn and Richard Talmadge
- Directed by: Harry S. Webb
- Written by: Leon Metzetti (story); Carl Krusada (continuity); Carl Krusada (dialogue)
- Produced by: Bernard B. Ray (producer); Harry S. Webb (associate producer)
- Starring: Richard Talmadge, Alberta Vaughn, George Walsh
- Cinematography: J. Henry Kruse; Abe Scholtz
- Edited by: Frederick Bain
- Distributed by: Reliable Pictures
- Release date: November 1, 1935
- Running time: 57 minutes
- Country: United States
- Language: English

The Live Wire is a 1935 American adventure film directed and produced by Harry S. Webb for Reliable Pictures, starring stuntman Richard Talmadge in the lead role.

== Plot ==
Professors Sneed and Harris find an ancient vase at a shop on the docks. They track down Dick Nelson, the sailor who sold it after finding it on an island where he was shipwrecked as a boy. They charter a ship to have Dick guide them to find more ancient treasures on this uncharted island; but they do not want Captain King to bring his daughter Madge, who usually sails with him, saying it will be too dangerous for a woman to go with them. Sam, the cook, helps Madge stow away aboard the ship. When she is found she pretends to be a boy, just hired on as a steward.

Dick's old nemesis, "Bull" Dennis, is hired to replace the first mate. Like Long John Silver, Bull plans a mutiny so he can keep all the treasure for himself and his pirate comrades. It looks like Dick and Madge, with the help of Sam and the others, are going to foil the mutineer’s plan, but the ship is lost in a fire, and, unbeknownst to each other, they all end up shipwrecked on the mysterious island.

At first Bill cannot remember where the ruins are, but he soon finds an entire lost city and civilization. Soon, however, they are fighting for their lives with the pirates to get off the island alive.

== Cast ==
- Richard Talmadge as 2nd Mate Dick Nelson
- Alberta Vaughn as Madge King
- George Walsh as Mate 'Bull' Dennis
- George Chesebro as Henchman Jacquard
- Charles K. French as Capt. King
- Martin Turner as Sam
- Henry Roquemore as Prof. Sneed
- Jimmy Aubrey as Prof. Harris
- Ben Hall as Steve (the Steward)

== Production ==
Although a Reliable Pictures release, much of it was filmed on existing sets at Universal, and footage from the 1934 serial Pirate Treasure was reused. The dock scenes were filmed in San Pedro, California.

After appearing in over 130 films, this was Alberta Vaughn's last movie.
