= The Silver Trail =

1937 film by Bernard B. Ray

- Directed by: Bernard B. Ray
- Written by: James Oliver Curwood (story "The Mystery of the Seven Chests"); James Oliver Curwood (original story); Bennett Cohen (continuity); Forrest Sheldon (dialogue)
- Produced by: Bernard B. Ray (producer); Harry S. Webb (associate producer)
- Starring: See below
- Cinematography: Pliny Goodfriend
- Edited by: Frederick Bain
- Production company: Reliable Pictures
- Release date: February 27, 1937
- Running time: 58 minutes
- Country: United States
- Language: English

The Silver Trail is a 1937 American Western film directed by Bernard B. Ray.

== Plot summary ==
Cowboy Bob Crandall is trying to find his friend that apparently is a rich miner, with help of bandit Molly Welburn he learns the truth.

== Cast ==
- Rex Lease as Bob Crandall
- Mary Russel as Molly Welburn, aka Mary Allen
- Ed Cassidy as Frank Sheridan
- Roger Williams as Sam Dunn
- Steve Clark as Tom (scenes deleted)
- Slim Whitaker as Henchman Slug
- Oscar Gahan as Henchman Curt
- James Sheridan as Henchman Tex
- Tom London as Looney
- Rin Tin Tin, Jr. as Rinty

== Soundtrack ==
- Goebel Leon Reeves - "I've Got a Good Job (Drifting Around)"
- Goebel Leon Reeves - "Lonesome Cowboy"
