= The Speed Reporter =

1936 film

- Directed by: Bernard B. Ray
- Written by: Harry S. Webb; Rose Gordon
- Produced by: Bernard B. Ray; Harry S. Webb
- Starring: Richard Talmadge; Luana Walters; Richard Cramer
- Cinematography: William Hyer
- Edited by: Carl Himm
- Music by: Lee Zahler
- Production company: Reliable Pictures
- Distributed by: Ajax Pictures
- Release date: May 14, 1936
- Running time: 55 minutes
- Country: United States
- Language: English

The Speed Reporter is a 1936 American crime film directed by Bernard B. Ray and starring Richard Talmadge, Luana Walters and Richard Cramer. It was produced as a second feature by the independent company Reliable Pictures.

== Plot ==
In a crime-ridden city, a gangster moves to increase his control over the various illegal rackets, with the support of a corrupt editor of a newspaper. A cub reporter on a rival takes on the challenge to smash the mob.

== Cast ==
- Richard Talmadge as Dick Lawrence
- Luana Walters as May
- Richard Cramer as Chuck Ballard, alias Brad Franklin
- Frank Hall Crane as Roger Renfrew
- Robert Walker as Stanley - City Editor
- John Ince as Publisher Madison
- Earl Dwire as Publisher John Parker
- George Chesebro as Blackie Smith
- Ed Cassidy as Edwards, a Henchman
- James Sheridan as Henchman Gat
- Victor Adamson as Henchman Butch
- Eddie Davis as Jim - Press Reporter
- William McCall as Hotel Doorman
- Otto Metzetti as Henchman Chip
- Victor Metzetti as Henchman Louie
- Dorothy Vernon as Miss Edwards

== Bibliography ==
- Langman, Larry. The Media in the Movies: A Catalog of American Journalism Films, 1900-1996. McFarland & Company, 1998.
- Pitts, Michael R. Poverty Row Studios, 1929–1940. McFarland & Company, 2005.
