= Santa Fe Bound =

1936 film

- Directed by: Harry S. Webb
- Written by: Carl Krusada (story); Rose Gordon (screenplay)
- Produced by: Bernard B. Ray (producer); Harry S. Webb (associate producer)
- Starring: See below
- Cinematography: William Hyer
- Edited by: Carl Himm
- Production company: Reliable Pictures
- Distributed by: Reliable Pictures; William Steiner
- Release date: 1936
- Running time: 58 minutes
- Country: United States
- Language: English

Santa Fe Bound is a 1936 American Western film directed by Harry S. Webb and produced by Webb and Bernard B. Ray for Reliable Pictures.

== Plot ==
Out on the trail cowboy Tom Crenshaw is forced to shoot and kill a bushwhacker. He takes the dead man's money belt and a letter he finds on him into the nearest town. It turns out that the bushwhacker was a killer hired by a local bandit leader, and the gang thinks that Tom is the man they hired. Tom decides to play along so he can expose the gang and bring them to justice, but it turns out that he gets into quite a bit more trouble than he bargained for.

== Cast ==
- Tom Tyler as Tom Crenshaw
- Jeanne Martel as Molly Bates
- Richard Cramer as Stanton
- Slim Whitaker as One-Shot Morgan
- Ed Cassidy as Henchman Logan
- Lafe McKee as Sheriff
- Dorothy Woods as Bridget, the housekeeper
- Charles King as Steve Denton
- Earl Dwire as Tibbets, mob leader
