= Ambush Valley =

1936 film by Bernard B. Ray

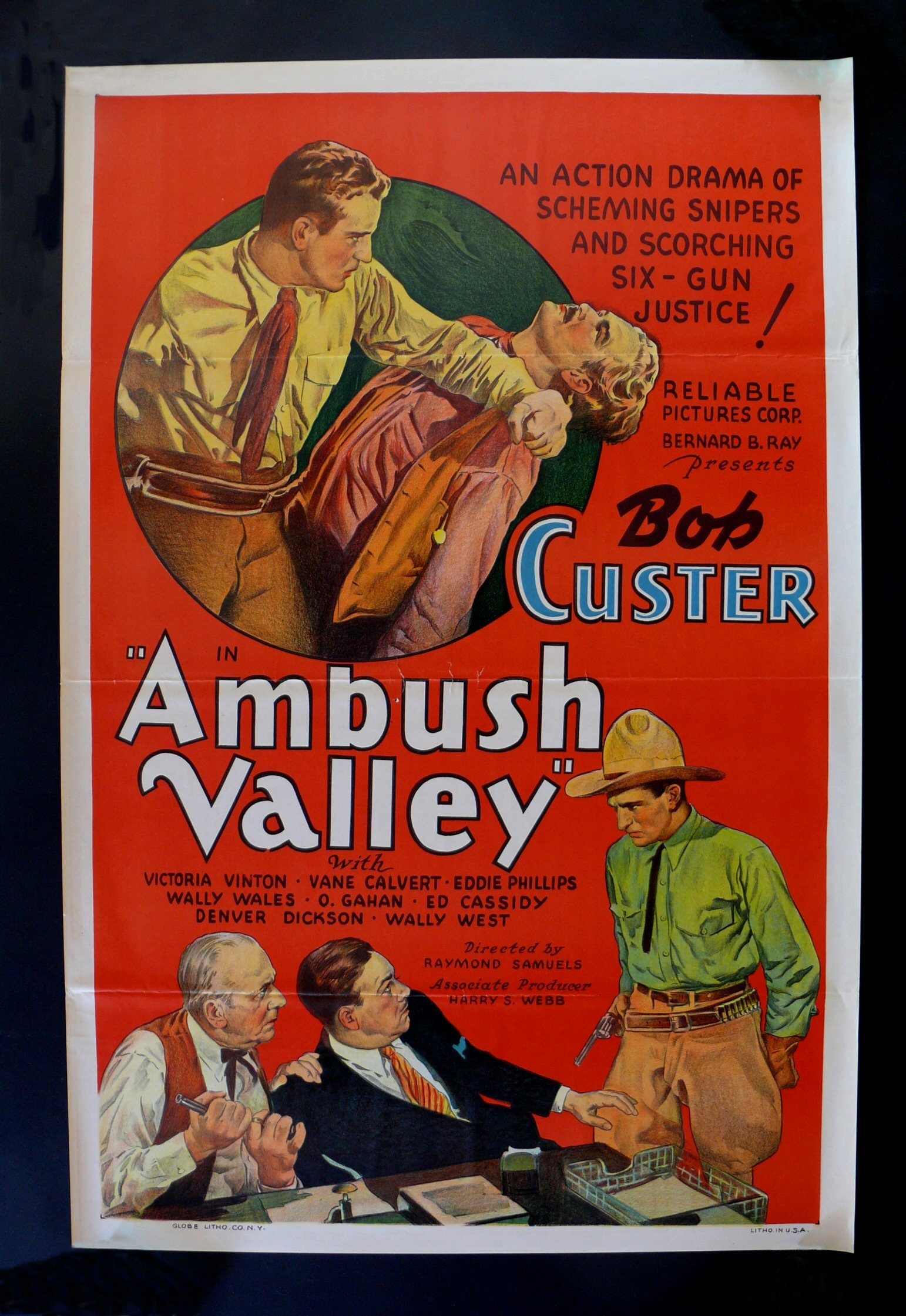
- Theatrical poster
- Directed by: Bernard B. Ray (as Franklin Shamray)
- Written by: Bennett Cohen (story); Forrest Sheldon (screenplay)
- Produced by: Bernard B. Ray (producer); Harry S. Webb (associate producer)
- Starring: Bob Custer, Victoria Vinton
- Cinematography: Paul Ivano
- Edited by: Frederick Bain
- Distributed by: Reliable Pictures
- Release date: October 24, 1936
- Running time: 57 minutes
- Country: United States
- Language: English

Ambush Valley is a 1936 American Western directed by Bernard B. Ray and starring Bob Custer and Victoria Vinton. It was produced by Ray and Harry S. Webb for Reliable Pictures.

== Plot ==
Familial relations, government land, impertinent landowners and incoming settlers combine in tragedy and gunplay.

== Cast ==
- Bob Custer as Bruce
- Victoria Vinton as Ann
- Vane Calvert as Ma Potter
- Philip Phillips as Clay
- Hal Taliaferro (as Wally Wales) as Joel
- Oscar Gahan as Diggs
- Ed Cassidy as Nester
- Victor Adamson (as Denver Dixon) as Nester
- Wally West as Nester
- Jimmy Aubrey (as Jack Anderson) as Father
- Jack Gilman as Son
- Oklahoma Rangers as Musicians

== Home media ==
The film was released on DVD on 22 March 2005 by Sinister Cinema.
