= Port of Hate =

- Theatrical release poster
- Directed by: Harry S. Webb
- Screenplay by: Joseph O'Donnell
- Story by: Forrest Sheldon
- Produced by: Harry S. Webb
- Starring: Polly Ann Young; Kenneth Harlan; Carleton Young; Shia Jung; Monte Blue; Frank LaRue
- Cinematography: Edward A. Kull
- Edited by: Bob Johns
- Production company: Metropolitan Pictures
- Distributed by: Monogram Pictures
- Release date: August 22, 1939
- Running time: 57 minutes
- Country: United States
- Language: English

Port of Hate is a 1939 American adventure film directed by Harry S. Webb and written by Joseph O'Donnell. The film stars Polly Ann Young, Kenneth Harlan, Carleton Young, Shia Jung, Monte Blue and Frank LaRue. The film was released on August 22, 1939, by Monogram Pictures.

== Cast ==
- Polly Ann Young as Jerry Gale
- Kenneth Harlan as Bob Randall
- Carleton Young as Don Cameron
- Shia Jung as Bo Chang
- Monte Blue as Hammond
- Frank LaRue as Bartley
- Ted Adams as Adams
- Jimmy Aubrey as Stone
- Bruce Dane as Lathrop
- Edward Cecil as Wing Hi
- John Elliott as Stevens
- Reed Howes as Hotel Clerk
