= Rafael Storm =

American actor

- Born: February 19, 1889; Oakland, California
- Died: February 17, 1951 (aged 61); Alameda, California
- Other name: Irvin Raphael Storm
- Occupation: Actor
- Years active: 1930–1945 (film)

Rafael Storm (1889–1951) was an American film actor.

== Selected filmography ==
- It Happened in New York (1935)
- The Plot Thickens (1935)
- Under the Pampas Moon (1935)
- The Fighting Pilot (1935)
- Lady Tubbs (1935)
- The House of a Thousand Candles (1936)
- When Ladies Meet (1941)
- Repent at Leisure (1941)
- Two Latins from Manhattan (1941)
- Submarine Base (1943)

== Bibliography ==
- Blottner, Gene. Columbia Pictures Movie Series, 1926-1955: The Harry Cohn Years. McFarland, 2011.
