= The Pal from Texas =

- Theatrical release poster
- Directed by: Harry S. Webb
- Screenplay by: Carl Krusada
- Story by: Forrest Sheldon
- Produced by: Harry S. Webb
- Starring: Bob Steele; Claire Rochelle; Josef Swickard; Betty Mack; Ted Adams; Carleton Young
- Cinematography: Edward A. Kull
- Edited by: Fred Bain
- Production company: Metropolitan Pictures Corporation
- Distributed by: Metropolitan Pictures Corporation
- Release date: November 1, 1939
- Running time: 56 minutes
- Country: United States
- Language: English

The Pal from Texas is a 1939 American Western film directed by Harry S. Webb and written by Carl Krusada. The film stars Bob Steele, Claire Rochelle, Josef Swickard, Betty Mack, Ted Adams and Carleton Young. The film was released on November 1, 1939, by Metropolitan Pictures Corporation.

== Cast ==
- Bob Steele as Bob Barton
- Claire Rochelle as Alice Malden
- Josef Swickard as Texas Malden
- Betty Mack as Queenie
- Ted Adams as Ace Brady
- Carleton Young as Joe Fox
- Jack Perrin as Sheriff
