= Vengeance of Rannah =

1936 film by Irvin Willat

- Directed by: Bernard B. Ray
- Written by: James Oliver Curwood (story); Joseph O'Donnell (screenplay)
- Produced by: Bernard B. Ray (producer); Harry S. Webb (associate producer)
- Starring: Bob Custer; Rin Tin Tin, Jr.
- Cinematography: Paul Ivano
- Edited by: Holbrook N. Todd
- Distributed by: Reliable Pictures
- Release date: 1936
- Running time: 56 minutes
- Country: United States
- Language: English

Vengeance of Rannah is a 1936 American Western film directed by Bernard B. Ray, produced by Ray and Harry S. Webb for Reliable Pictures, and starring Bob Custer and Rin Tin Tin, Jr.

== Plot ==
Insurance investigator Ted Sanders is assigned to look into a robbery/murder. When he arrives at the crime scene he is met by a local deputy. What he doesn't know, however, is that the "deputy" is actually part of the gang that committed the crime. He plants some of the stolen money in Sanders' room to frame him for the crime, then arrests him.

== Cast ==
- Rin Tin Tin, Jr. as Rannah
- Bob Custer as Ted Sanders
- John Elliott as Doc Adams
- Victoria Vinton as Mary Warner
- Roger Williams as Frank Norcross
- Oscar Gahan as Henchman Nolan
- Eddie Phillips as Henchman Macklin
- Ed Cassidy as Sam, posing as Barlow
- Wally West as Deputy Barlow
