= Reliable Pictures =

American film company

Reliable Pictures was an American film production and distribution company which operated from 1933 until 1937. Established by Harry S. Webb and Bernard B. Ray, it was a low-budget Poverty Row outfit that primarily specialized in Westerns. After its demise, the company's studios were taken over by Monogram Pictures.

== Selected filmography ==
- The Mystic Hour (1933)
- Mystery Ranch (1934)
- The Cactus Kid (1934)
- Rawhide Mail (1934)
- Ridin' Thru (1934)
- Fighting Hero (1934)
- Terror of the Plains (1934)
- The Silver Bullet (1935)
- The Laramie Kid (1935)
- Midnight Phantom (1935)
- Unconquered Bandit (1935)
- North of Arizona (1935)
- Never Too Late (1935)
- Wolf Riders (1935)
- The Test (1935)
- The Live Wire (1935)
- Loser's End (1935)
- The Cactus Kid (1935)
- Rio Rattler (1935)
- Skull and Crown (1935)
- Born to Battle (1935)
- Coyote Trails (1935)
- Tracy Rides (1935)
- Texas Jack (1935)
- Trigger Tom (1935)
- The Fighting Pilot (1935)
- Silent Valley (1935)
- Pinto Rustlers (1936)
- Ridin' On (1936)
- The Speed Reporter (1936)
- Vengeance of Rannah (1936)
- Step on It (1936)
- Santa Fe Bound (1936)
- Fast Bullets (1936)
- The Millionaire Kid (1936)
- Caryl of the Mountains (1936)
- Ambush Valley (1936)
- Roamin' Wild (1936)
- Santa Fe Rides (1937)
- The Silver Trail (1937)

== Bibliography ==
- Balio Tino. Grand Design: Hollywood as a Modern Business Entertprise 1930-1939. University of California Press, 1995.
- Pitts, Michael R. Poverty Row Studios, 1929–1940: An Illustrated History of 55 Independent Film Companies, with a Filmography for Each. McFarland & Company, 2005.
