= Ridin' On =

1936 film

- Directed by: Ira Webb
- Written by: Arthur Carhart (novel); John T. Neville
- Produced by: Bernard B. Ray; Harry S. Webb
- Starring: Tom Tyler; Joan Barclay; Rex Lease
- Cinematography: Pliny Goodfriend
- Edited by: Fred Bain
- Production company: Reliable Pictures
- Distributed by: Reliable Pictures
- Release date: February 29, 1936
- Running time: 56 minutes
- Country: United States
- Language: English

Ridin' On is a 1936 American western film directed by Ira Webb and starring Tom Tyler, Joan Barclay and Rex Lease. It was produced and distributed as a low-budget second feature by the independent Poverty Row studio Reliable Pictures.

== Cast ==
- Tom Tyler as Tom Rork
- Joan Barclay as Gloria O'Neil
- Rex Lease as Danny O'Neil
- John Elliott as Jess Rork
- Earl Dwire as Buck O'Neil
- Bob McKenzie as Doc Onderdonk
- Roger Williams as Lou Bolton
- Slim Whitaker as Black Mike Gonzado
- Nelson McDowell as Pete - Blacksmith
- Jimmy Aubrey as Jimmy - Cowhand

== Bibliography ==
- Fetrow, Alan G. . Sound films, 1927-1939: a United States Filmography. McFarland, 1992.
- Pitts, Michael R. Poverty Row Studios, 1929–1940: An Illustrated History of 55 Independent Film Companies, with a Filmography for Each. McFarland & Company, 2005.
