= Fangs of the Wild (1939 film) =

- Directed by: Raymond K. Johnson
- Written by: Carl Krusada
- Produced by: Harry S. Webb
- Starring: Dennis Moore; Luana Walters; Tom London
- Cinematography: Edward A. Kull
- Edited by: Frederick Bain
- Music by: Johnny Lange; Lew Porter
- Production company: Metropolitan Pictures
- Distributed by: Astor Pictures
- Release date: July 1939
- Running time: 52 minutes
- Country: United States
- Language: English

Fangs of the Wild is a 1939 American drama film directed by Raymond K. Johnson and starring Dennis Moore, Luana Walters and Tom London.

== Cast ==
- Dennis Moore as Don Brady
- Luana Walters as Carol Dean
- Tom London as Larry Dean
- Ted Adams as Fur salesman Lewis
- Mae Busch as Fur buyer
- George Chesebro as Fur thief Brad
- Jimmy Aubrey as Fur thief Pete
- Bud Osborne as Clem
- George Morrell as Captain Dwyer
- Martin Spellman as Buddy Brady
- Rin Tin Tin, Jr. as Rinty, Don's dog

== Bibliography ==
- Pitts, Michael R. Poverty Row Studios, 1929-1940. McFarland & Company, 2005.
