= Harry S. Webb =

American film producer (1892–1959)

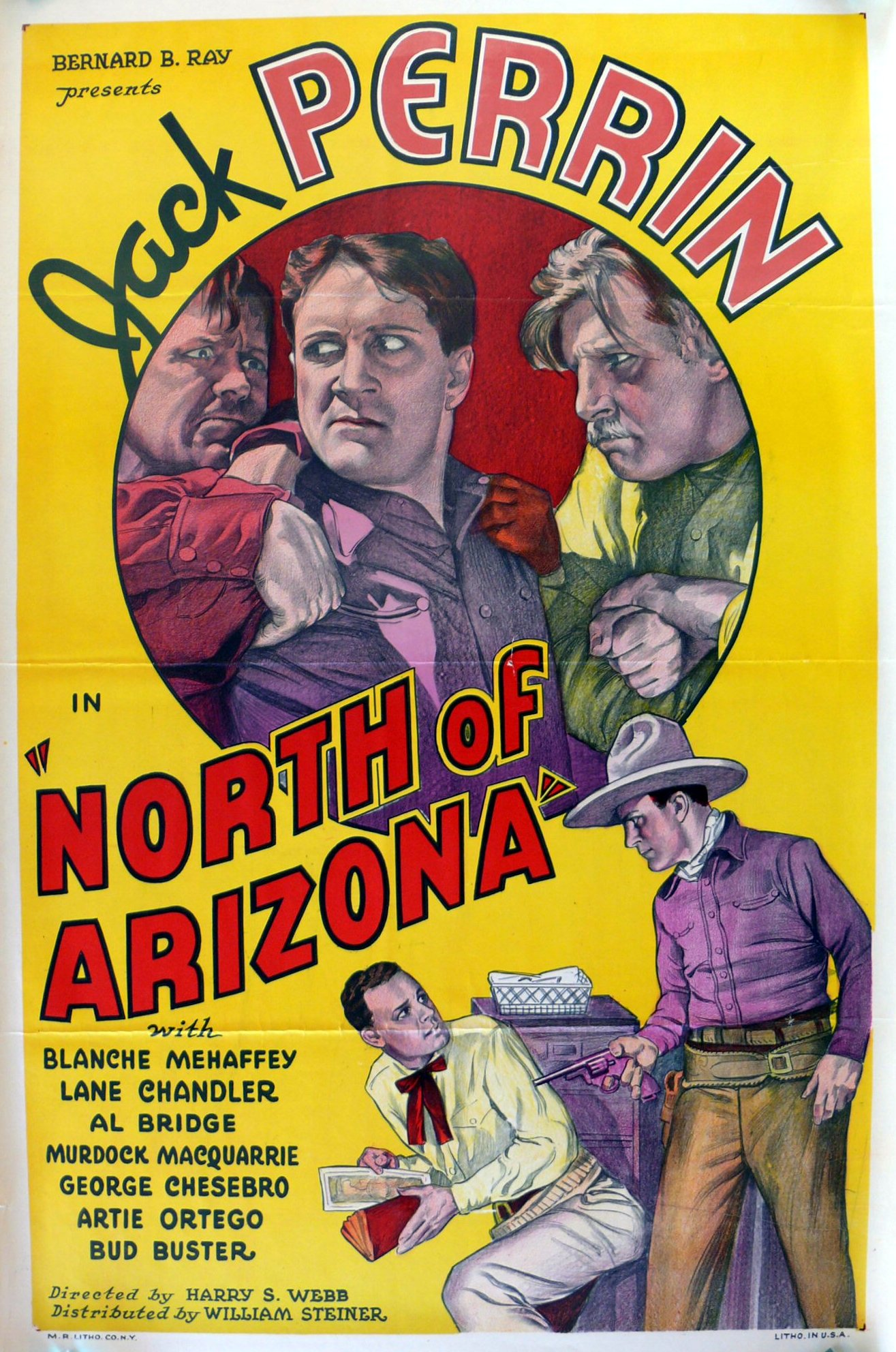
- Born: October 15, 1892; Pennsylvania
- Died: July 4, 1959 (aged 66); Hollywood
- Occupations: Film producer Film director Screenwriter
- Years active: 1924–1940
- Spouse: Rose Gordon

Harry S. Webb (October 15, 1892 – July 4, 1959) was an American film producer, director and screenwriter. He produced 100 films between 1924 and 1940. He also directed 55 films between 1924 and 1940. He was the brother of "B"-film producer and director Ira S. Webb and the husband of screenwriter Rose Gordon, who wrote many of his films.

In 1933 Webb and Bernard B. Ray created Reliable Pictures Corporation with a studio at Beachwood and Sunset Boulevard in Hollywood. Reliable produced and released many Westerns, starting with Girl Trouble (1933), until the company closed in 1937. Its final release was The Silver Trail.

Webb and Ray then started Metropolitan Pictures Corporation in 1938, which produced and released several films until 1940, its last being Pinto Canyon. Webb then produced Westerns for Monogram Pictures.

He was born in Pennsylvania and died in Hollywood, from a heart attack.

== Selected filmography ==
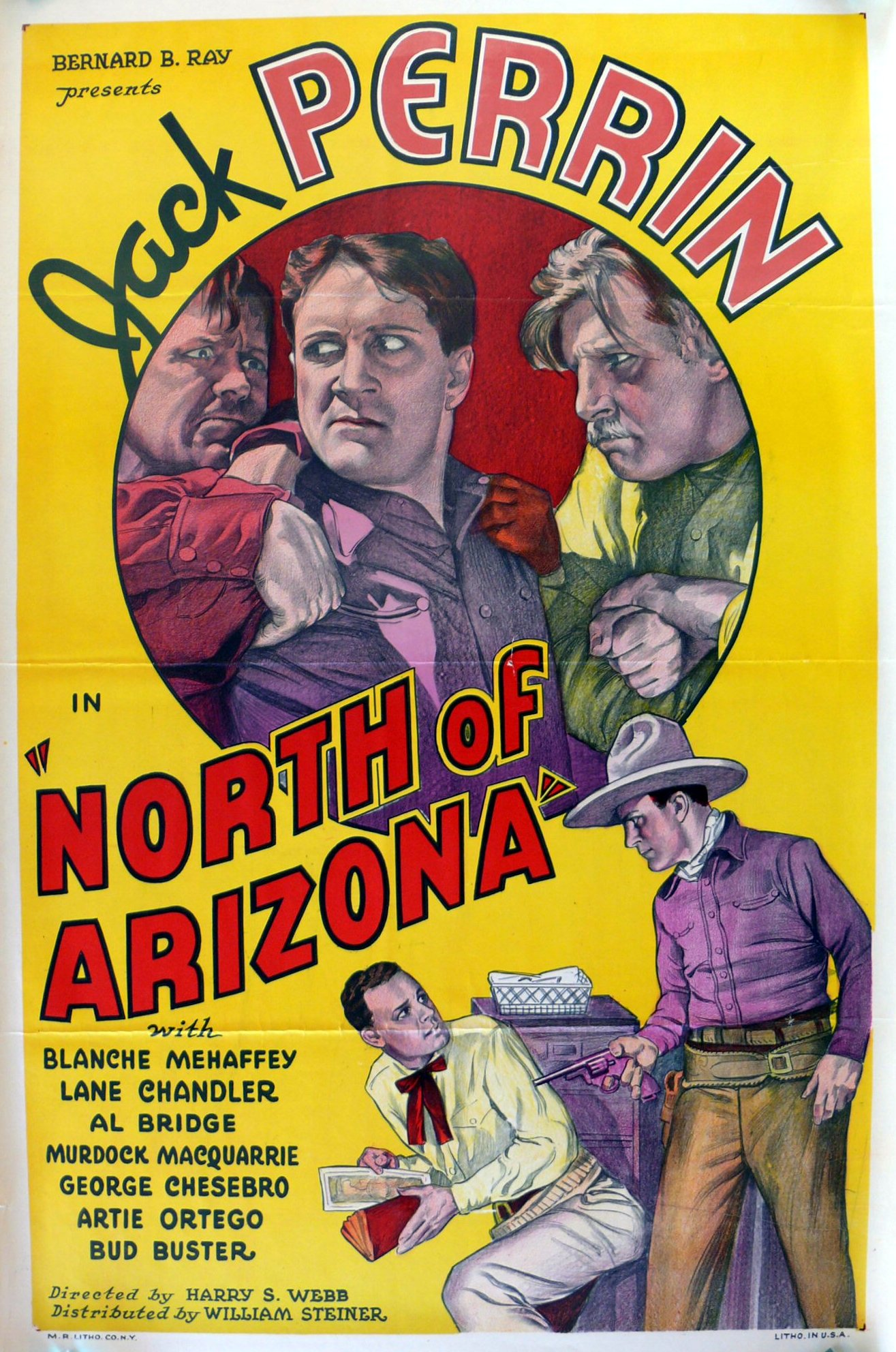
Poster for North of Arizona, a 1935 film directed by Webb

- Reputation (1921)
- The Knockout Kid (1925)
- The Empty Saddle (1925)
- Winning a Woman (1925)
- The Man from Oklahoma (1926)
- Thunderbolt's Tracks (1927)
- The Golden Stallion (1927) serial; director
- Isle of Sunken Gold (1927) serial; director
- Heroes of the Wild (1927) serial; director
- The Phantom of the North (1929) director
- Dark Skies (1929)
- Untamed Justice (1929)
- Beyond the Rio Grande (1930)
- The Phantom of the Desert (1930)
- Firebrand Jordan (1930)
- Westward Bound (1930)
- West of Cheyenne (1931)
- Hell's Valley (1931)
- Red Fork Range (1931)
- Swanee River (1931)
- The Lone Trail (1932)
- Riot Squad (1933) director & producer
- Ridin' Thru (1934)
- Loser's End (1935)
- North of Arizona (1935)
- The Live Wire (1935) director & associate producer
- Born to Battle (1935) director & producer
- The Test (1935) associate producer
- Ambush Valley (1936)
- The Speed Reporter (1936)
- Vengeance of Rannah (1936) associate producer
- Santa Fe Bound (1936) director
- The Riding Avenger (1936)
- The Silver Trail (1937)
- Santa Fe Rides (1937)
- The Great Adventures of Wild Bill Hickok (1938)
- It's All in Your Mind (1938)
- Feud of the Range (1939)
- Smoky Trails (1939)
- Mesquite Buckaroo (1939)
- Law of the Wolf (1939)
- Fangs of the Wild (1939)
- Port of Hate (1939)
- The Pal from Texas (1939)
- El Diablo Rides (1939)
- Riders of the Sage (1939)
- Wild Horse Valley (1940)
- Wild Horse Range (1940)
- The Cheyenne Kid (1940)
- Covered Wagon Trails (1940)
- Pinto Canyon (1940)
- Pioneer Days (1940)
- Land of the Six Guns (1940)
- The Kid from Santa Fe (1940)
- Riders from Nowhere (1940)
