= Doctor Satan's Robot =

- Written by: Franklin Adreon; Ronald Davidson; Norman S. Hall; Joseph F. Poland; Barney A. Sarecky; Sol Shor
- Directed by: William Witney; John English
- Starring: Edward Ciannelli; Robert Wilcox; William Newell; C. Montague Shaw; Ella Neal; Dorothy Herbert
- Country of origin: United States
- Original language: English

Production
- Producer: Hiram S. Brown Jr.
- Cinematography: William Nobles
- Running time: 100 minutes

Original release
- Network: Syndication
- Release: 1966

Doctor Satan's Robot is a 1966 made for television film condensed from the original 1940 Mysterious Doctor Satan film serial named after its chief villain. Master criminal Doctor Satan has a nemesis, a masked mystery man, the "Copperhead", whose secret identity is Bob Wayne. Wearing a copper mask, Wayne is searching for justice and revenge on Satan for the death of his step-father. With Doctor Satan creating a mechanical robot that will terrorize the world, Wayne is determined to stop the criminal plans of the evil doctor.

Doctor Satan's Robot and Mysterious Doctor Satan was directed by the directorial team of William Witney and John English. Doctor Satan is played by Edward Ciannelli and the Copperhead/Bob Wayne by Robert Wilcox.

Henry Brandon originally cast as Doctor Satan, was to play in a devil costume, complete with horns. The character was developed into a mad scientist played by Ciannelli.

== Plot ==
Governor Bronson (Charles Trowbridge), who raised Bob Wayne (Robert Wilcox) from childhood after the death of his parents, is killed at the hands of mad scientist Doctor Satan (Edward Ciannelli). Before he dies, Bronson confides to Wayne a secret about his father who had been an outlaw in the Old West, who fought injustice while wearing a chainmail cowl and leaving small coiled copper snakes as his calling card.

Following his guardian's death, Wayne decides to adopt his father's thirst for justice and wear his Copperhead mask. Doctor Satan, meanwhile, requires only a remote control device invented by Professor Scott (C. Montague Shaw) to complete his army of killer robots and gain all the power and riches he desires. Knowing that he has an enemy, Satan uses the threat of killing the Professor's daughter, Lois (Ella Neal) to keep the Cooperhead from disrupting his plans.

The Copperhead attempts to protect the Professor and his daughter and stymies the efforts of Doctor Satan and his gang. In his fight with the criminal mastermind, the Copperhead uses the doctor's own diabolical device to defeat Doctor Satan.

=== Cast ===
- Eduardo Ciannelli (credited as Edward Ciannelli) as mad scientist Doctor Satan.
- Robert Wilcox as Bob Wayne/The Copperhead (Note: David Sharpe doubled Robert Wilcox, playing the Copperhead when in costume.)
- William Newell as Speed Martin, a reporter
- C. Montague Shaw as Professor Thomas Scott, inventor of a remote control device for the military
- Ella Neal as Lois Scott, reporter and Professor Scott's daughter
- Dorothy Herbert as Alice Brent, Professor Scott's secretary
- Charles Trowbridge as Governor Bronson
- Jack Mulhall as Police Chief Rand
- Edwin Stanley as Col. Bevans
- Walter McGrail as Stoner, thug leader
- Joe McGuinn as Gort, a thug
- Bud Geary as Hallett, a thug
- Paul Marion as Corbay, a thug
- Archie Twitchell as Ross, airport radio operator
- Lynton Brent as Scarlett, a thug
- Ken Terrell as Corwin, a thug
- Al Taylor as Joe, a thug
- Bert LeBaron as Fallon, gas plant thug
- Tom Steele as The Robot

== Production ==
Mysterious Doctor Satan was originally planned as a Superman serial for Republic, but the license National Comics provided to the Fleischer Studios to make their Superman cartoon series was exclusive and therefore prevented other film companies from using the character at the time, even in a non-animated production. The script was subsequently reworked with a new character standing in for Superman.

Mysterious Doctor Satan was filmed between September 20 and October 29, 1940 under the working title Doctor Satan, at a cost of $147,381. Locations included the Iverson Movie Ranch in Chatsworth, California.

According to Raymond William Stedman in Serials: Suspense and Drama By Installment (1971), Republic was unconsciously "observing the transfer of the costumed crusader from prairie to pavement" in the writing of this serial. The western cowboy hero would soon be replaced in popular culture by superheroes and masked crimefighters.

=== Special effects ===
The Mysterious Doctor Satan serial introduces the updated "Republic robot". A more primitive design had appeared in Undersea Kingdom. The new robot would appear again in Zombies of the Stratosphere (1952) where the "bank robbery by robot" scene was reused as stock footage. It was parodied in the metafictional The Adventures of Captain Proton "holo-novels" of Star Trek: Voyager as "Satan's Robot". Director William Witney in his book, In a Door, Into a Fight, Out a Door, Into a Chase: Moviemaking Remembered by the Guy at the Door (2005), considered the Mysterious Doctor Satan as one of his lesser serials. He was especially unhappy with the robot calling it a "water heater" and proposed a more extravagant one to special effects head Howard Lydecker. The studio, however, had neither time nor money to create the new robot before filming was to begin so Witney was stuck with the "hot water boiler".

== Release ==
=== Television ===
In the early 1950s, Mysterious Doctor Satan was one of 14 Republic serials edited into a television series. It was broadcast in seven 26½-minute episodes (the other 13 all had only six episodes).

Mysterious Doctor Satan was also one of 26 Republic serials re-released as a film in a syndication television package released in 1966. The title of the film was changed to Doctor Satan's Robot and was re-edited down to 100-minutes in length.

== Critical reception ==
Film historians Harmon and Glut describe Mysterious Doctor Satan as "one of Republic's best serials ... [which] set the pace for others that followed". They go on to narrow it down to one of the five or six greatest serials Republic ever made. Many people involved in the serial are singled out for praise but the main one is Ciannelli as Doctor Satan, a character who steals the show from the relatively bland Copperhead. The directors, William Witney and John English are noted as the best in their field. Cy Feuer is praised for his music, which is both moody and exciting. Mention is also made of the "superior" lighting and "some of the best stunt work in the fights to ever appear on screen in any kind of film".

The tone of the serial was set by Eduardo Ciannelli's "piercing malevolent countenance". Ciannelli's performance "in a role so susceptible to overacting and scenery chewing" maintained the "exact balance between a wild-eyed lunatic with dreams of world conquest and the brilliant, gifted man of science that Doctor Satan might have been. There was a poignancy in his portrayal that gave the uneasy feeling that this cruel genius was somehow a victim of forces that drove him to evil against his basic desire. Nothing was said or done in the screenplay to indicate it, but the feeling was there, nonetheless".

Aviation film historians Hardwick and Schnepf noted that "aircraft devotees will enjoy seeing early Stinsons and Ryan ST".
