= John Moore (broadcaster) =

Canadian broadcaster, film critic, voice actor and comedian (born 1966)

- Born: June 5, 1966 (age 59); Montreal, Quebec, Canada
- Education: Vanier College; Concordia University
- Occupations: Radio broadcaster, film critic and comedian.

John Sanford Moore (born June 5, 1966), better known as John Moore, is a Canadian radio and television broadcaster, film critic, voice actor and comedian. He works for the CFRB 1010 radio station in Toronto, Ontario.

== Early life ==
Moore was born in Montreal, Quebec, and grew up in Notre-Dame-de-Grâce, a predominantly English-speaking area of Montreal. He attended West Hill High School, where he served as student body president. Moore began his post-secondary studies at Vanier College. While attending university he taught pre-school and worked in corporate public relations. He graduated with dual degrees in Communications at Concordia University, and from the School of Community and Public Affairs.

== Career ==
Moore launched his career in radio journalism as a reporter at CHOM-FM in Montreal. He was also active in improv, being a founding member Montreal's On The Spot players.

Since 1999, Moore has worked as an entertainment reporter and film reviewer on the morning show at radio station CFRB 1010 in Toronto, Ontario usually Mondays to Fridays at 7:50 a.m. Not long after the 2003 departure of John Oakley to competing station CFMJ, he began hosting The John Moore Show during afternoon drive time. Moore is also an entertainment reporter for CFRB's sister station CJAD out of Montreal. In the fall of 2009 it was announced that John would replace Bill Carroll as the morning host on Newstalk 1010.

In 2004, Moore appeared in The Day After Tomorrow as a New York reporter announcing that Lower Manhattan is "virtually inaccessible".

Moore in the Morning began airing on October 5, 2009. The show features a number of contributors including: sports anchor Mike Toth, National Post columnist Christie Blatchford, Maclean's National Editor Andrew Coyne, movie critic Richard Crouse, and business reporter Rubina Ahmed-Haq. The show is produced by Joseph Cristiano. The technical producer is Robert Turner. Moore in the Morning airs weekday mornings from 6:00am to 10:00am.

He has previously worked for Radio-Canada, French language radio and hosted a television fishing show. Moore also hosted Mystery Ink, a show about mystery fiction that aired frequently on the Mystery TV specialty television channel. Moore was also the host of Escalator Movie Reviews on Global TV. Moore is also the host of Guy Stuff, a panel discussion program on mentv and Fox Sports World Canada.

His television voice acting credits include Ripley's Believe It or Not!, The Little Lulu Show, Arthur, A Miss Mallard Mystery, Caillou, Flight Squad, Jim Button, Animal Crackers, The Country Mouse and the City Mouse Adventures, Sci-Squad, The Triplets, Team S.O.S. and Potatoes and Dragons. His video game credits include Wizardry 8, Splinter Cell and Splinter Cell: Chaos Theory.

Moore considers his most memorable news reporting experience to have occurred years after he had given up hard news coverage when he found himself in New York City when the September 11 attacks occurred. In 2006, Moore appeared as a contestant on the game show, Jeopardy! He placed last, finishing with a negative amount of money. On November 26, 2007, The John Moore Show did a segment in which he questioned the factual accuracy of Wikipedia.

Moore lives in Toronto. He has a column in the National Post.
