= CFRB =

Radio station in Toronto, Ontario, Canada

- Toronto, Ontario; Canada
- Broadcast area: Greater Toronto Area
- Frequency: 1010 kHz
- Branding: Newstalk 1010

Programming
- Format: News/talk
- Affiliations: Bell Media; Premiere Networks; CBS News Radio

Ownership
- Owner: Bell Media; (Bell Media Radio G.P.)
- Sister stations: CFTO-DT, CP24, CKVR-DT, CHUM, CHUM-FM, CKFM-FM

History
- First air date: February 19, 1927
- Former frequencies: 1030 kHz (1927); 960 kHz (1927–1931); 690 kHz (1931–1941); 860 kHz (1941–1948)
- Call sign meaning: "Canada's First Rogers Batteryless"

Technical information
- Licensing authority: CRTC
- Class: A (Clear-channel)
- Power: 50,000 watts
- Transmitter coordinates: 43°30′20.2″N 79°37′50.6″W
- Repeaters: 99.9 CKFM-HD2 (Toronto); Shortwave: (6.07 MHz) CFRX (Toronto)

Links
- Webcast: Listen Live

CFRB (1010 AM) is a commercial radio station in Toronto, Ontario, Canada. It is owned by Bell Media and carries a News/Talk radio format. Its studios and offices are in the Entertainment District at 250 Richmond Street West.

One of the oldest surviving radio stations active in Toronto, CFRB went on the air on February 19, 1927, as 9RB owned by Edward S. Rogers Sr., with the callsign derived from its parent Rogers Vacuum Tube Company, and the station moved to its current 1010 AM frequency in 1948. Throughout ownership changes for most of the decade and its format remained intact, the station was acquired by Slaight Broadcasting in 1985, before being acquired by Astral Media in 2007 and ultimately sold to Bell Canada, rival company of Rogers Communications, founded by Rogers Sr.'s son, Ted Rogers Jr., in 2013.

CFRB is a clear channel station powered at 50,000 watts, the maximum permitted in Canada. While it is a Class A station, it also must protect CBR in Calgary, which shares Class A status on 1010 AM. CFRB uses a four-tower array directional antenna in the Clarkson neighbourhood of Mississauga. CFRB is simulcast on shortwave station CFRX at 6.07 MHz in the 49 metre band and on sister station 99.9 CKFM-FM-HD2, a digital subchannel. CFRB is also heard across Canada on Bell Satellite TV channel 964.

== History ==
=== Early years ===
CFRB first signed on the air on February 19, 1927. It is not Toronto's very first radio station, but it is the city's oldest English-language broadcaster still operating today. (CJBC, which now operates in French, was founded in 1925.) It was founded by the Rogers Vacuum Tube Company. The station was used to promote Edward S. Rogers Sr.'s invention of a batteryless radio receiver that could be operated using alternating current and therefore did not need the cumbersome battery that had previously been required. The station itself was a demonstration of Rogers' application of his invention to radio transmitters as well as receivers, a development that allowed for a signal that reproduced voices and music more clearly. The new type of transmitter also made CFRB the world's first all-electric radio station. The letters "RB" in the station's callsign stand for "Rogers' Batteryless".

The station began transmitting on an experimental basis in January 1927 as 9RB, before being converted to commercial operation a few weeks later, as CFRB. Those call letters have been used continuously since then. On February 19, the inaugural broadcast was a live symphony orchestra concert conducted by Jack Arthur. During its first years, CFRB leased time to two phantom stations: CNRX, owned by Canadian National Railways and providing programs of Canada's first radio network, and its rival Canadian Pacific Radio's CPRY, owned by the Canadian Pacific Railway. The CNR's network was discontinued in 1933, with many of its assets eventually passing to the Canadian Broadcasting Corporation (CBC), and the CPR's radio service was discontinued in 1935.

CFRB's first studios were in a mansion on Jarvis Street north of Wellesley Street, built by the family of Hart Massey. In 1929, the station moved to purpose-built studios at 37 Bloor Street West. In the same year, the station became a network affiliate of the Columbia Broadcasting System.

In 1932, CFRB began airing the General Motors Hockey Broadcast, which had originated on the CNR's network. This program eventually became Hockey Night in Canada, and continued to be aired by CFRB for many years, despite also airing on the CBC's flagship station CBL, and continues to this day on CBC Television and Rogers Sportsnet.

From the 1930s to the 1950s, CFRB was the radio broadcaster for the Toronto Santa Claus Parade.

In 1937, CFRB began to simulcast on shortwave station CFRX at 6070 kHz.

Following the sudden death of Edward S. Rogers Sr. in 1939, Rogers Majestic Corporation Limited was sold in 1941 and became Standard Radio Limited. In turn, the company was acquired by Argus Corporation in 1946.

On November 1, 1946, Wally Crouter joined CFRB. He eventually became its morning drive time host, a position he would hold until his retirement on November 1, 1996, after exactly fifty years at the station.

=== Changing frequencies and studios ===
CFRB and CJBC, owned by the CBC, made a frequency switch on September 1, 1948. CFRB moved to 1010 while CJBC took over the Class I-A clear-channel frequency at 860, previously used by CFRB. The CBC wanted its stations in major cities to be on Class I-A frequencies. But CFRB, which had been running at 20,000 watts, was boosted to 50,000 watts, giving it wide coverage over Southern Ontario.

Beginning in 1948, through until the early 1970s, CFRB made several unsuccessful bids for a licence to operate a television station in Toronto.

In 1965, CFRB moved its studios from 37 Bloor Street West to 2 St. Clair Avenue West (at Yonge Street). At around the same time, Standard Radio Limited was renamed Standard Broadcasting.

A long-lasting show, Calling All Britons featuring news, sports scores and music from Britain, began in 1965. It was hosted by Ray Sonin until his death in 1991.

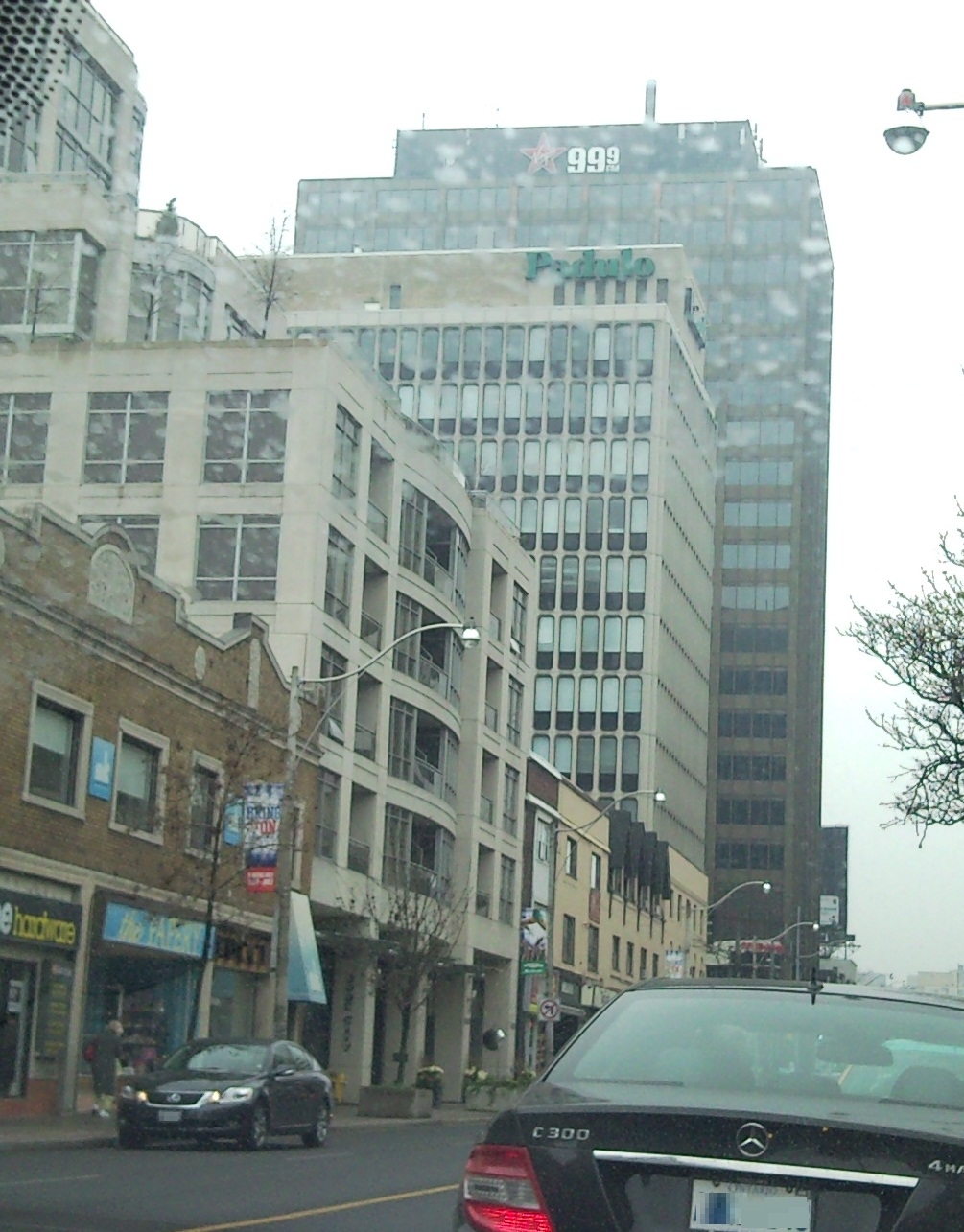
The station's former downtown Toronto studios, shared with CHBM-FM (now owned by Newcap) and CKFM-FM.

=== New ownership ===
In 1978, Argus Corporation was acquired by Conrad Black and his brother Montegu, thus also giving them ownership of Standard Broadcasting. In November 1985, Slaight Broadcasting acquired Standard from the Blacks. In October 2007, Slaight sold Standard to Astral Media.

Ted Rogers, the communications mogul and son of CFRB's founder, had vowed to re-acquire the station that his family had lost after his father's death, and considered his failure to do so his greatest disappointment. Reports indicate that he continued to attempt to re-acquire CFRB right up until his death in December 2008.

In July 2013, with a buyout of Astral Media, CFRB was acquired by Bell Media, a subsidiary of Bell Canada which already owns the CTV Television Network and rival competitor to Rogers Communications founded by Ted Rogers. Shortly after the purchase, Bell announced that it would move the studios and offices of CFRB and sister station CKFM-FM from their long-time location at St. Clair Avenue and Yonge Street, to 250 Richmond Street West at Richmond and Duncan (which already houses the operations of sister radio stations, CHUM and CHUM-FM). The building is adjacent to 299 Queen Street West located at Queen Street and John Street (which already houses the operations of several Bell Media specialty television channels including CP24 and MuchMusic). The move took place on May 10, 2014.

== Transmitter ==
The transmitting antennas for CFRB are a prominent landmark along Lake Ontario, a four-tower array in the Clarkson neighbourhood of Mississauga. The towers are visible from over 100 km away. They are used as a landmark for navigation by pilots, on approach to Toronto Pearson International Airport, or to Toronto Island Airport. The antenna array consists of four vertical masts, 168 metres (550 feet) in height.

CFRB was one of few stations to broadcast in AM stereo, starting in 1984. However, since AM stereo never achieved wide acceptance, the station deactivated its stereo broadcasting system in the mid-1990s.

The transmitter is located on Royal Windsor Drive, 200 meters west of the intersection of Lakeshore Road West (former King's Highway 2) and Southdown Road, at the coordinates 43.505748°N 79.631786°W.

=== Shortwave relay ===
CFRX
Shortwave relay of CFRB
- Toronto, Ontario; Canada
- Broadcast area: North America
- Frequency: 6.070 MHz (49-metre band)
- Branding: Newstalk 1010

Programming
- Format: News–talk

Ownership
- Owner: Bell Media
- Sister stations: CFRB, CKFM-FM

History
- First air date: February 11, 1937

Technical information
- Power: 1 kW

Links
- Webcast: Listen live
- Website: iheartradio.ca/newstalk-1010

CFRX is a shortwave relay of CFRB, simulcasting the station's news–talk programming on 6.070 MHz in the 49-metre band. The station operates with a nominal transmitter power of 1 kW from CFRB's transmitter site in the Clarkson neighbourhood of Mississauga.

CFRX began broadcasting at 7:30 a.m. on February 11, 1937. It was established to extend CFRB's programming to northern Ontario and western Canada, where conventional radio service was limited. Its original transmitter was located with CFRB's facilities in Aurora, Ontario, and used two vertical towers arranged to direct the signal northwest.

When CFRB prepared to move its transmitting facilities from Aurora to Clarkson in 1948, the company considered discontinuing CFRX. It instead relocated the shortwave transmitter after receiving hundreds of letters from listeners asking that the service be retained.

During the 2000s, CFRX installed a solid-state transmitter and replaced its directional antenna system with a single vertical antenna producing a non-directional signal. The change broadened its potential coverage, including reception by Canadians travelling or spending the winter in the United States. Although the transmitter is rated at 1 kW, its reported output has been approximately 900 watts.

The National Research Council discontinued the shortwave broadcasts of its CHU time-signal station on June 22, 2026, leaving CFRX as the last shortwave station broadcast from Canada.

== Programming ==
=== Current programming ===
CFRB broadcasts a predominantly news and talk radio schedule featuring both local and nationally distributed programs. As of July 2026, its weekday lineup includes Moore in the Morning with John Moore, The Jerry Agar Show, The Vassy Kapelos Show, The Deb Hutton Show and The Jim Richards Show. The station carries the nationally syndicated Shane Hewitt and The Night Shift during the evening and also broadcasts simulcasts of CTV News Toronto and CTV National News.

The weekday afternoon and evening schedule was reorganized in July 2024 when Hutton was assigned the 2–4 p.m. period, Richards moved to afternoon drive from 4–6 p.m. and Hewitt's nationally distributed program was added from 7–11 p.m.

Weekend programming includes news, financial, home-improvement, technology, lifestyle and public-affairs programs, along with podcasts, television simulcasts and repeats. Programs listed by the station include Totally Useless Information, Taking Stock, The Home Improvement Show, The Greg Carrasco Show, Your Life, Your Money, On the Ledge, The Sunday Money Show, Ask the Experts, Tech Talk and CTV's Question Period.

=== Morning programming ===
CFRB was historically known for its morning-drive program hosted by Wally Crouter. Crouter joined the station in 1946 and began presenting its morning show several weeks later. Originally titled Top O' the Morning, it was later known as the Wally Crouter Show. He remained its host until retiring on November 1, 1996, completing 50 years with CFRB. At the height of its popularity during the 1970s and 1980s, the program attracted approximately half a million listeners.

Andy Barrie joined CFRB from CJAD in Montreal in 1977. Initially heard during the evening, he later became one of the station's weekday late-morning talk hosts. By 1992, his program aired from 10 a.m. until shortly before noon, and it was subsequently moved to a 9:30 a.m. start. Barrie left CFRB in 1995 to become host of CBC Radio's Toronto morning program, Metro Morning.

Following Crouter's retirement, Ted Woloshyn, who had previously presented weekend programs and worked as a fill-in host at CFRB, took over the morning show on November 4, 1996. The Ted Woloshyn Show was a live weekday talk program; in 2002, it aired from 5 to 9 a.m.

In the fall 1998 Toronto ratings, Woloshyn's CFRB program recorded a 10.8-percent share of the morning audience, compared with 6 percent for Barrie's Metro Morning. Both programs trailed the morning shows on CHFI-FM and CHUM-FM. In 2003, however, Metro Morning surpassed CFRB in the Toronto ratings and became the city's highest-rated morning radio program.

Woloshyn left the morning program in December 2006 after ten years as host. He was succeeded in January 2007 by Bill Carroll, who had previously hosted CFRB's mid-morning program. John Moore moved from afternoon drive to the morning period during a major schedule reorganization in 2009, while Carroll returned to the mid-morning period. Moore's program was subsequently titled Moore in the Morning.

=== Programming history ===
==== Early programming ====
During CFRB's first years, much of its programming was produced live. Its inaugural broadcast on February 19, 1927, featured a symphony orchestra conducted by Jack Arthur, together with vocalists, chamber groups and a Hawaiian quartet. Early regular programming included George Wade and His Cornhuskers and Denton Massey's York Bible Class. In 1928, the station began carrying newscasts directly from the editorial offices of The Globe, using remote-broadcasting equipment installed there.

After CFRB moved to 37 Bloor Street West in 1929, its studios included an auditorium for live audiences. The station produced numerous sponsored Canadian programs that were distributed to stations elsewhere in Ontario and Quebec. That year, CFRB became a CBS affiliate, initially carrying The Majestic Theatre of the Air. It was also the first Canadian station to originate a program for broadcast on the American CBS network.

==== Expansion during the 1930s ====
During the 1930s, station manager Harry Sedgwick moved CFRB away from its earlier reliance on unpaid performers and amateur musicians and developed a schedule of professionally produced sponsored programming. Its programs included concerts by the Canadian National Railways Symphony, the Imperial Oil Symphony Concert, the Canadian General Electric Vagabonds, C.I.L.'s Opera House of the Air and musical programs featuring orchestras led by Luigi Romanelli.

CFRB became the Toronto flagship of the General Motors Hockey Broadcast in 1932, carrying Toronto Maple Leafs games called by Foster Hewitt. The broadcast subsequently developed into Hockey Night in Canada. Wes McKnight presented the accompanying sports-interview and commentary program Sportsviews, which became a long-running feature of the station's early-evening schedule.

The station's daytime programming also included agricultural and women's-interest programs. Rex Frost's Farm Broadcast, introduced in 1933, combined market information with discussion of agricultural issues. Kate Aitken joined CFRB in 1934, while journalist Claire Wallace began presenting the daily commentary program Tea Time Topics in 1935. Wallace later became one of Canada's best-known female radio broadcasters.

CFRB expanded its news programming in 1936 by hiring journalist Jim Hunter, who read newscasts from the editorial offices of the Toronto Telegram. During the Moose River Gold Mines disaster that year, the station broadcast updates approximately every 20 minutes over a period of 129 hours. In 1937, CFRB's programming began to be relayed on the shortwave station CFRX, extending its reach beyond southern Ontario.

==== Second World War ====
During the Second World War, CFRB retained its mixture of news, commentary, sports, music and service programming. Its schedule included Frost's farm reports, McKnight's Sportsviews, national hockey broadcasts and programs directed toward women and households. Al Savage hosted the morning program in the early 1940s, while John Collingwood Reade, Jim Hunter and later Jack Dennett presented news and political commentary. Dennett joined CFRB in 1943 and took over its 11 p.m. newscast, beginning a lengthy career in which he wrote, edited and presented several daily newscasts.

Gordon Sinclair began broadcasting for CFRB in 1942 with profiles of Canadian military leaders involved in the Dieppe Raid. These led to his daily midday feature, Let's Be Personal, and he formally joined the station's news department on D-Day, June 6, 1944, presenting a ten-minute late-morning newscast. His other programs included Show Business, as well as regular news and commentary segments. In 1973, he delivered "The Americans", a commentary that attracted international attention. Sinclair remained with CFRB until his death in 1984, after which Bob Hesketh and later Charles Doering succeeded him in the station's late-morning news and commentary period.

The wartime schedule continued to include lighter programming. Cy Strange hosted Slumbertime, which combined readings with organ music by CFRB musical director Wally Armour. In 1945, CFRB's programming included Roly Young's entertainment reports, Kate Aitken's talks for women, Ann Adam's cooking and household program Homecrafters, Barry Wood's morning program Top of the Morning, and news and analysis from Sinclair, Reade, Hunter and Dennett.

Canadian comedy duo Johnny Wayne and Frank Shuster began their professional broadcasting careers at CFRB in 1941. They appeared on Javex Wife Preservers, a program in which they presented household advice in comic form. The pair later became prominent figures in Canadian radio and television comedy.

==== Postwar personalities ====
During the postwar period, CFRB became closely associated with a group of long-serving news, talk and entertainment personalities.

Betty Kennedy joined CFRB as its public-affairs editor in 1959. She hosted the weekday Betty Kennedy Show, an hour-long interview and public-affairs program, for 27 years. Kennedy was credited with interviewing approximately 25,000 guests, including Canadian political figures and international entertainers, before leaving the station in August 1986.

Other prominent voices in CFRB's schedule during the 1960s and 1970s included morning host Wally Crouter, newscaster Jack Dennett, Earl Warren, Bill McVean, Bill Deegan and Ray Sonin. Pierre Berton and Charles Templeton hosted the daily discussion program Dialogue from 1966 until leaving for CKEY in 1970. Sonin hosted the weekday nostalgia program Down Memory Lane for 18 years, until its cancellation in 1986, and continued presenting the Saturday program Calling All Britons.

==== Transition to news and talk ====
CFRB began a gradual transition toward an all-news-and-talk format in 1990. The station introduced newscasts every half hour throughout the day, replaced the final hour of Crouter's morning program with a news magazine and expanded its 11 p.m. newscast to one hour. Crouter's program was consequently shortened to run from 5:30 to 9 a.m., followed by The World This Morning.

By 1992, the weekday schedule included Crouter in morning drive, The World This Morning, Andy Barrie in late mornings, The World at Noon, afternoon news program The World Today, Charles Adler in the evening and John Oakley overnight. The station's weekend schedule had also become predominantly talk-based, with hosts including Larry Grossman, Ted Woloshyn, Bill McVean, Mark Breslin and Larry Solway.

Paul and Carol Mott, known as the Motts, joined CFRB in 1993, initially hosting an afternoon program. Barrie left the station in 1995 to become host of CBC Radio One's Metro Morning, and Oakley moved into Barrie's late-morning time slot. Michael Coren succeeded Oakley in the evening period, while the Motts' afternoon program was expanded.

Crouter retired on November 1, 1996, after nearly 50 years at CFRB, and Ted Woloshyn assumed the morning program three days later. The revised weekday lineup placed Adler from 9 a.m. until noon, the Motts from noon until 2 p.m. and Oakley from 2 to 4 p.m. Jim Richards joined CFRB as an overnight host in 1997, while Bill Carroll joined its news department. By August 1998, Woloshyn hosted mornings, Carroll presented the 9–10 a.m. period, the Motts occupied late mornings and noon, Oakley hosted afternoons, and Richards remained in the overnight period. The evening schedule included Mike Stafford, Michael Coren and Jane Hawtin.

In 1999, Marty Galin and Avrum Rosensweig joined CFRB from Talk 640 to host a Saturday evening food program from 6 to 7 p.m. Their weekly live show, titled Marty & Avrum: The Food Guys, featured discussions about food and restaurants.

==== Programming changes since 2009 ====
In August 2009, CFRB dismissed several of its personalities, including Michael Coren, Paul and Carol Mott, Christina Cherneskey, Jacqui Delaney and newscaster Kris McCusker. A new weekday lineup was announced the following month. Moore moved from afternoon drive to mornings, Carroll moved to the 9 a.m.–1 p.m. period, Richards took over from 1–4 p.m. and former Ontario Progressive Conservative leader John Tory became host of the afternoon-drive program.

Carroll left CFRB in 2010 to join KFI in Los Angeles and was replaced in the midday period by Jerry Agar.

From February 2012 until November 2013, CFRB aired a Sunday municipal-affairs program, The City, hosted by Toronto mayor Rob Ford and his brother, city councillor Doug Ford. The station cancelled the program in November 2013 amid the controversy surrounding the mayor's admission that he had used crack cocaine. The Fords were succeeded in the Sunday time slot by their former chief of staff, Mark Towhey, whose program continued until 2021.

In 2016, former Progressive Conservative Party of Ontario leader Tim Hudak began hosting a Sunday program on CFRB. His program ended in 2021.

In 2021, Richards began hosting The Late Showgram, a nationally syndicated overnight program carried by Bell Media's iHeartRadio talk stations. The program initially aired from midnight until 5 a.m. Eastern Time. Richards subsequently returned to CFRB's local schedule, hosting Newstalk Tonight before moving to afternoon drive in 2024.

The afternoon-drive program The Rush was formerly hosted by Jay Michaels and Ryan Doyle. Reshmi Nair and Scott MacArthur became its hosts in April 2022, following the departures of Michaels and Doyle. Nair and MacArthur left the program in 2023, after which it was presented by rotating hosts. The program was later removed from the station's schedule.

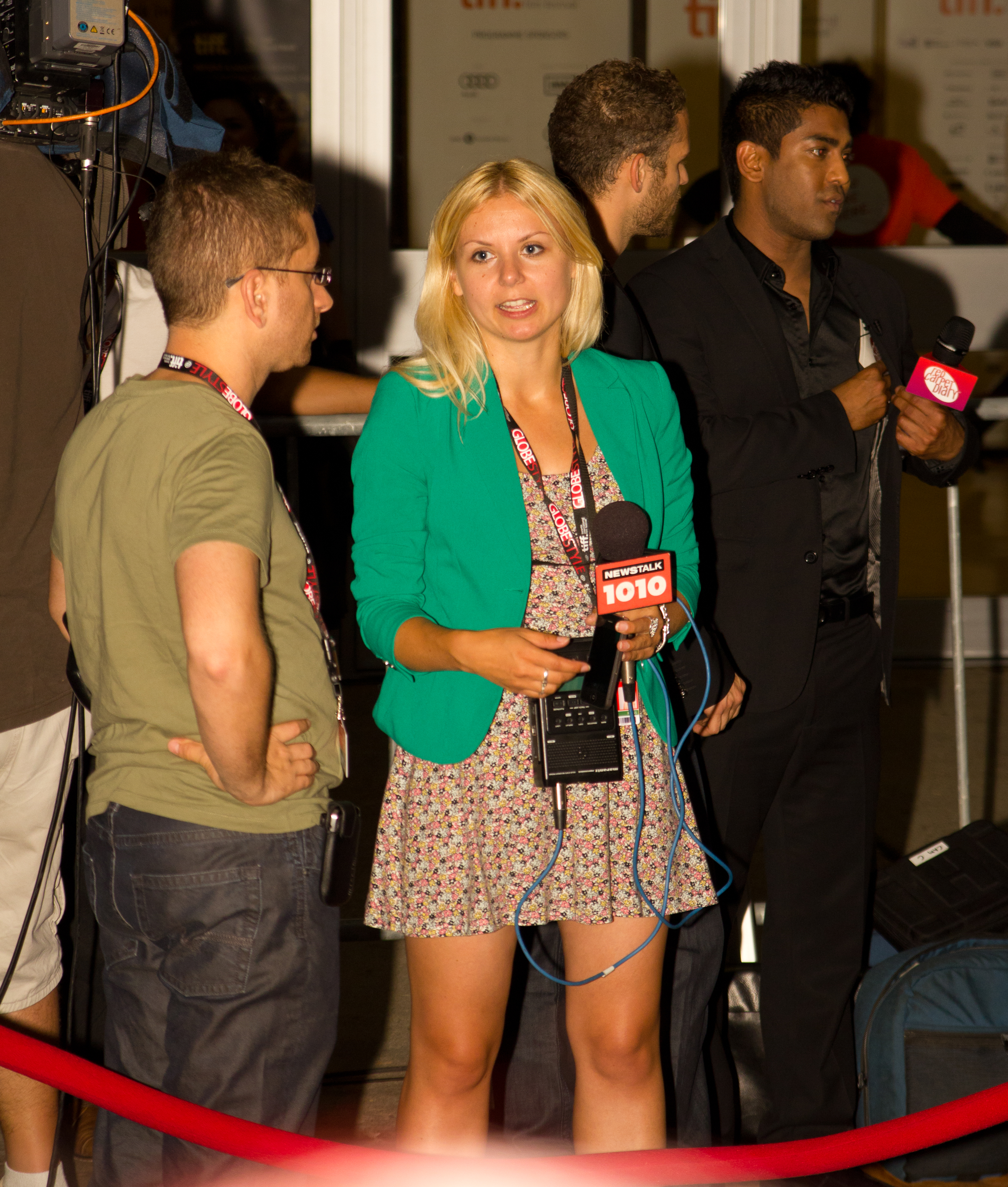
Newstalk 1010 reporter Justine Lewkowicz at the 2012 Toronto International Film Festival premiere of Seven Psychopaths.

=== Staff reductions ===
In February 2021, Bell Media eliminated positions across its Canadian media properties. The affected Newstalk 1010 employees included news director Kym Geddes, hosts Ted Woloshyn and Barb DiGiulio, anchor David McKee and reporters or anchors Hayley Cooper, Lucas Meyer and Claude Feig.

== Notable staff ==
- Charles Adler
- Kate Aitken
- Richard Alway
- Andy Barrie
- Dick Beddoes
- Jaymz Bee
- Pierre Berton and Charles Templeton
- Mark Breslin
- Mike Bullard
- Bill Carroll
- Desmond Cole
- Michael Coren
- Wally Crouter
- Fred Davis
- Jack Dennett
- Dave Devall
- Erica Ehm
- Mark Elliot
- Tarek Fateh
- Royce Frith
- Marty Galin & Avrum Rosensweig (Marty & Avrum)
- Dan Gallagher
- Larry Grossman
- Monty Hall
- Avery Haines
- Jane Hawtin
- Larry Henderson
- Foster Hewitt
- Dave Hodge
- Mary Ito
- Erica Johnson
- Taborah Johnson
- Paul Jones
- Betty Kennedy
- Andrew Krystal
- Stephen LeDrew
- Brian Linehan
- John Majhor
- Pat Marsden
- Denton Massey
- Brian McFarlane
- Wes McKnight
- Farah Nasser
- David Onley
- Valerie Pringle
- Leslie Roberts
- Bruce Rogers
- Lynne Russell
- Percy Saltzman
- Peter Shurman
- Peter Silverman
- Gordon Sinclair
- Evan Solomon
- Larry Solway
- Ray Sonin
- George Stroumboulopoulos
- Cy Strange
- Ellie Tesher
- Mike Toth
- Claire Wallace
- Wayne and Shuster
- Brian Williams and Don Cherry
- Ted Woloshyn
