= The Vigilantes Return =

1947 film by Ray Taylor

- Directed by: Ray Taylor
- Screenplay by: Roy Chanslor (Original Screenplay)
- Produced by: Howard Welsch
- Starring: Jon Hall; Margaret Lindsay; Andy Devine
- Cinematography: Virgil Miller
- Edited by: Paul Landres
- Color process: Cinecolor
- Production company: Universal Pictures
- Distributed by: Universal Pictures
- Release date: 1947
- Running time: 67 minutes
- Country: United States
- Language: English

The Vigilantes Return is a 1947 American Western film directed by Ray Taylor and starring Jon Hall, Margaret Lindsay and Andy Devine. it was shot in Iverson Ranch in Chatsworth, Los Angeles, California.

== Plot ==
Marshal Johnnie Taggart, posing as an outlaw named "Ace" Braddock, comes to Bannack, Montana to restore law and order. But he is recognized by Kitty, co-owner with Clay Curtwright, of the infamous Bull Whip saloon. But "bad-girl" Kitty keeps her mouth shut. When Johnnie's pal Andy reports a stage holdup, Curtwright's henchman, Ben Borden, talks the sheriff and Judge Holden into suspecting Johnnie. Johnnie reveals himself to Judge Holden as a government marshal, and the judge voices his opinion that Curtwright is the leader of the road agents, but voices it in the presence of his granddaughter, Louise Holden. The Judge doesn't know that Louise is in love with Curtwright, and she tips him off as to Johnnie's real identity. Curtwright frames Johnnie for a murder and arranges for the crooked sheriff to promote a lynching and Andy and Kitty help Johnnie escape jail. Johnnie rounds up vigilantes and heads for a showdown at the Bull Whip saloon.

== Cast ==
- Jon Hall as Marshal Johnnie Taggart/'Ace' Braddock
- Margaret Lindsay as Kitty
- Andy Devine as Andy
- Paula Drew as Louise Holden
- Jack Lambert as Ben Borden - Henchman
- Jonathan Hale as Judge Holden
- Robert Wilcox as Clay Curtwright
- Arthur Hohl as Sheriff
- Joan Shawlee as Ben's Girl (as Joan Fulton)
- Lane Chandler as Messenger
- Wallace Scott as Bartender
