= Bill Carroll (broadcaster) =

Canadian radio personality

- Born: July 29, 1959 (age 67); Scotland
- Occupation: Radio broadcaster
- Spouse: Sylvie Lapointe
- Children: 2

Bill Carroll is a Canadian radio personality who has hosted talk radio shows in both Canada and the United States. He has been the host of The Morning Rush with Bill Carroll on CFRA in Ottawa since March 7, 2016.

== Biography ==
Carroll was born in Scotland on July 29, 1959, and grew up in Coatbridge near Glasgow. He came with his family to Toronto, Ontario, Canada in the late 1960s. The family first lived in Don Mills in an apartment (later in a townhouse in Scarborough), where he attended Stephen Leacock Collegiate Institute, a few years before Mike Myers.

Bill married Sylvie LaPointe in July 2003. They have two children, Killian and Magalie. Like Bill's father, Magalie was born with spina bifida. Bill has cited as one of the reasons for his relocation to California was to be closer to Ramon Cuevas, a physical therapist who had worked with Magalie.

== Career ==
Out of high school in 1980, Carroll moved to New Liskeard, Ontario. "My first job was as news director for the station CJTT. This meant I was also the morning news anchor and the news reporter — I was a one-man department. But it was a great place to learn about broadcast journalism. "I hadn't formally studied journalism, so once I got the job I bought every book on broadcast journalism I could find. At night I would study to be a broadcast journalist, and practice during the day." Bill was the co-host of MuchMusic's game show spoof Test Pattern, along with Dan Gallagher. After a stint in Peterborough, Ontario, he joined Q107 in Toronto, on a news program named "Barometer". He subsequently worked at its sister station TALK 640 as morning host, before joining CFRB in 1998; first as a weekend newscaster and entertainment reporter, then as news director, before assuming his talk show.

In October 2004, Carroll was named to host Global Television's Focus Ontario, a weekly public affairs show. His tenure there lasted until fall 2005, when he was replaced by Sean Mallen.

In 2010, he went to work at KFI in Los Angeles.

On December 21, 2012, Carroll made an announcement on his Facebook page. "Today I have in my hand a new long term agreement to remain at KFI. Awesome! But that's not all. Starting January 7th next year, my Toronto fans can hear me each weekday on Talk Radio AM640 as they drive home from 4 to 7 PM. A completely different show for Toronto listeners on issues they care about. 640 in L.A. and 640 in T.O. It's almost poetic. To my Toronto fans, thanks so for missing me." He was joined on AM640 Toronto by Sandy Salerno and Chris Chreston.

On January 7, 2016, at the end of the final hour of his daily broadcast, Carroll announced that this would be his last show on KFI, and that he was leaving, effective immediately, and moving back to Canada to be closer to family.

On February 5, 2016, at the end of his show, Carroll announced that he had decided not to stay on CFMJ- AM640 as he was not able to secure a long-term contract renewal and wanted certainty for his family. The February 5th show was his last show for CFMJ.

During his career Bill has been recognized with a number of awards including – the Edward R Murrow Award for hosting live coverage in Washington, D.C., for President Obama’s first inauguration. The RTNDA Sam Ross Award National and Central Region 2008 for radio editorial. The RTNDA Sam Ross Award Central Region for TV Editorial 2006.

On February 18, 2016, Carroll was announced as the new morning host on AM 580 CFRA in Ottawa to premiere on March 7 of that year. The new program is called "The Morning Rush with Bill Carroll".

In June 2023, Bill Carroll was recognized with a Lifetime Achievement Award from the Radio Television Digital News Association (RTDNA) for his contributions to the industry.

== News ==
=== FLICK-OFF Campaign ===
On April 26, 2007, the Ontario Provincial government launched a new environment campaign with a slogan "FLICK-OFF". The phrase resembled the derogatory phrase fuck off (because the 'L' and the 'I' together could be perceived as a 'U'). Carroll claimed children will see the derogatory word, sending the wrong message. He sarcastically told the government and some callers to Flick-off on live radio.

=== Switch over ===
On December 15, 2006, it was announced on The Six O'clock News Hour that Bill Carroll would be replacing Ted Woloshyn as host of The Morning Show starting January 2007. Woloshyn had announced that very morning that he was resigning, after celebrating his tenth anniversary as CFRB Morning host (following Wally Crouter's 50-year tenure).

However, Carroll unlike Woloshyn, started his show at 6:00 am instead of 5:30 am. His show ends at 10:00 am instead of 8:30 am. In 2009, he was moved to the 9 am to 1 pm slot as host of an eponymous program which ran until his move to Los Angeles the next year.

=== Lawsuit ===
In March 2007, Tim Hortons filed a defamation lawsuit against Carroll, Standard Radio, which owned CFRB, and CanWest for his allegations on CFRB and Global TV that the Canadian taxpayers were footing the bill for its well-publicised franchise in Afghanistan.

Carroll said on his Global TV commentary: "Tim Hortons has been sliding by on the great publicity about the Kandahar franchise all these months and then Global uncovers the dirty little secret. You and I, the taxpayers, are picking up $4 or 5 million dollars a year so that they can look good to the public ... Shame on Tim Hortons."

Tim Hortons Inc. is seeking $35 million from all three for the false statement.

== Personal ==
Carroll sat as a member of the Board of Governors for the Canadian student newspaper The Prince Arthur Herald.
