= Lee Van Atta =

American actor

- Born: July 22, 1922; San Francisco, California]
- Died: February 15, 2002 (aged 79); Carrollton, Texas

Lee Van Atta (July 22, 1922 – February 15, 2002) was an American child actor from 1936 to 1939.

== Filmography ==
Year	Title	Role	Notes
1936	Too Many Parents	Cadet	Uncredited
1936	Undersea Kingdom	Billy Norton	
1936	Second Wife	Kenneth Carpenter Jr.	
1937	Beware of Ladies	Newspaper Boy	Uncredited
1937	Dick Tracy	Junior	Serial
1937	Captains Courageous	Boy	Uncredited
1937	Dangerous Holiday	Eddie	Uncredited
1938	The Affairs of Annabel	Robert Fletcher	
1939	Twelve Crowded Hours	Copyboy	Uncredited
