= Mysterious Doctor Satan =

1940 film by John English, William Witney

- Theatrical release poster
- Directed by: William Witney; John English
- Written by: Franklin Adreon; Ronald Davidson; Norman S. Hall; Joseph F. Poland; Sol Shor
- Produced by: Hiram S. Brown Jr.
- Starring: Edward Ciannelli; Robert Wilcox; William Newell: C. Montague Shaw; Ella Neal; Dorothy Herbert
- Cinematography: William Nobles
- Distributed by: Republic Pictures
- Release dates: December 13, 1940 (U.S. serial); July 16, 1954 (West Germany); 1966 (U.S. TV film)
- Running time: 15 chapters (267 minutes (serial); 7 26½-minute episodes (TV); 100 minutes (TV film)
- Country: United States
- Language: English
- Budget: $147,847 (negative cost: $147,381)

Mysterious Doctor Satan (also known as Doctor Satan's Robot) is a 1940 American film serial directed by William Witney and John English. Produced by Republic Pictures, the serial stars Edward Ciannelli, Robert Wilcox, William Newell, C. Montague Shaw, Ella Neal, and Dorothy Herbert. The title of the serial is derived from that of its chief villain.

Doctor Satan's main opponent is the masked mystery man, "The Copperhead", whose secret identity is Bob Wayne, a man searching for justice and revenge on Satan for the death of his guardian Governor Bronson. The serial charts the conflict between the two as Bob Wayne pursues Doctor Satan, while the latter completes his plans for world domination.

Henry Brandon was originally intended to play the part of Doctor Satan while wearing a regular devil costume, complete with horns. At the end of the 1930s, however, this would have stretched credulity too far, even for a serial, so a more realistic villain was written in the form of a sleek, gangster-style mad scientist played by Ciannelli.

The serial first began as a screenplay for Republic's never-produced Superman serial, which was cancelled after various problems arose with securing the rights to the famous and popular comic book character.

Mysterious Doctor Satan was later remade in Turkish as The Deathless Devil.

== Plot ==
Governor Bronson, who raised Bob Wayne from childhood after the death of his parents, is killed at the hands of a world-domination-seeking mad scientist called Doctor Satan. Fearing his death might be at hand, as it has been for everyone else who had opposed the Doctor, the Governor first confides in Wayne with a secret about his past. Bob's father was really an outlaw in the Old West, who fought injustice while wearing a chainmail cowl and leaving small coiled copper snakes as his calling card.

Following his guardian's death, Wayne decides to adopt his father's Copperhead persona and cowl. Doctor Satan, meanwhile, requires only a remote control device invented by Professor Scott to complete his army of killer robots and gain all the power and riches he desires.

The Copperhead battles Doctor Satan, rescuing the Professor and others and preventing the Doctor from completing his plot.

== Cast ==
- Eduardo Ciannelli (credited as Edward Ciannelli) as mad scientist Doctor Satan.
- Robert Wilcox as Bob Wayne/The Copperhead
- William Newell as Speed Martin, a reporter
- C. Montague Shaw as Professor Thomas Scott, inventor of a remote control device for the military
- Ella Neal as Lois Scott, reporter and Professor Scott's daughter
- Dorothy Herbert as Alice Brent, Professor Scott's secretary
- Charles Trowbridge as Governor Bronson
- Jack Mulhall as Police Chief Rand
- Edwin Stanley as Col. Bevans
- Walter McGrail as Stoner, thug leader
- Joe McGuinn as Gort, a thug
- Bud Geary as Hallett, a thug
- Paul Marion as Corbay, a thug
- Archie Twitchell as Ross, airport radio operator
- Lynton Brent as Scarlett, a thug
- Ken Terrell as Corwin, a thug
- Al Taylor as Joe, a thug
- Bert LeBaron as Fallon, gas plant thug
- Tom Steele as The Robot

== Chapter titles ==
1. Return of the Copperhead (30 min 15s)
2. Thirteen Steps (17 min 41s)
3. Undersea Tomb (17 min 18s)
4. The Human Bomb (16 min 42s)
5. Doctor Satan's Man of Steel (16 min 54s)
6. Double Cross (16 min 44s)
7. The Monster Strikes (16 min 53s)
8. Highway of Death (16 min 40s)
9. Double Jeopardy (16 min 39s)
10. Bridge of Peril (16 min 40s)
11. Death Closes In (17 min 12s)
12. Crack-Up (17 min 16s)
13. Disguised (16 min 42s)
14. The Flaming Coffin (16 min 45s)
15. Doctor Satan Strikes (16 min 44s)

_{Source:}

== Production ==
Mysterious Doctor Satan was originally planned as a Superman serial for Republic, but the license National Comics provided to the Fleischer Studios to make their Superman cartoon series was exclusive and therefore prevented other film companies from using the character at the time, even in a non-animated production. The script was subsequently reworked with a new character standing in for Superman. The Copperhead's love interest, Lois, had only her surname changed between these drafts, while his secret identity, down to the surname, mimicked Batman's Bruce Wayne, National's other major comic book character.

Mysterious Doctor Satan (serial production number 1095) was filmed between September 20 and October 29, 1940, under the working title Doctor Satan, at a cost of $147,381.

According to Raymond William Stedman in Serials: Suspense and Drama By Installment (1971), Republic was unconsciously "observing the transfer of the costumed crusader from prairie to pavement" in the writing of this serial. The western cowboy hero would soon be replaced in popular culture by superheroes and masked crimefighters.

=== Special effects ===
The Mysterious Doctor Satan serial introduces the updated "Republic robot", described in Phil Hardy's The Aurum Film Encyclopedia: Science Fiction as "charming, rather than frightening". A more primitive design had appeared in Undersea Kingdom. The new robot would appear again in Zombies of the Stratosphere (1952). It was parodied in the metafictional The Adventures of Captain Proton "holo-novels" of Star Trek: Voyager as "Satan's Robot".

Director William Witney in his book, In a Door, Into a Fight, Out a Door, Into a Chase: Moviemaking Remembered by the Guy at the Door (2005), considered the Mysterious Doctor Satan as one of his lesser serials. He was especially unhappy with the robot and proposed a more extravagant one to special effects head Howard Lydecker. The studio, however, had neither time nor money to create the new robot before filming was to begin, so Witney was stuck with the "hot water boiler" used in previous Republic serials.

The "bank robbery by robot" scene was reused in the later Republic serial Zombies of the Stratosphere.

=== Stunts ===
- James Fawcett doubling William Newell
- Eddie Parker
- David Sharpe doubling Robert Wilcox, playing The Copperhead when in costume.
- Tom Steele
- Duke Taylor
- Helen Thurston doubling Dorothy Herbert
- Wally West
- Bud Wolfe

== Release ==
=== Theatrical ===
The official release date for Mysterious Doctor Satan is December 13, 1940, although this is actually the date the seventh chapter was made available to film exchanges.

=== Television ===
In the early 1950s, Mysterious Doctor Satan was one of 14 Republic serials edited into a television series. It was broadcast in seven 26½-minute episodes (the other 13 all had only six episodes).

Mysterious Doctor Satan was also one of 26 Republic serials re-released as a film on television in 1966. The title of the film was changed to Doctor Satan's Robot. This version was cut down to 100-minutes in length.

== Critical reception ==
Film historians Harmon and Glut describe Mysterious Doctor Satan as "one of Republic's best serials ... [which] set the pace for others that followed". They go on to narrow it down to one of the five or six greatest serials Republic ever made. Many people involved in the serial are singled out for praise, but the main one is Ciannelli as Doctor Satan, a character who steals the show from the relatively bland Copperhead. The directors, William Witney and John English are noted as the best in their field. Cy Feuer is praised for his music, which is both moody and exciting. Mention is also made of the "superior" lighting and "some of the best stunt work in the fights to ever appear on screen in any kind of film".

The tone of the serial was set by Eduardo Ciannelli's "piercing malevolent countenance". Ciannelli's performance "in a role so susceptible to overacting and scenery chewing" maintained the "exact balance between a wild-eyed lunatic with dreams of world conquest and the brilliant, gifted man of science that Doctor Satan might have been. There was a poignancy in his portrayal that gave the uneasy feeling that this cruel genius was somehow a victim of forces that drove him to evil against his basic desire. Nothing was said or done in the screenplay to indicate it, but the feeling was there, nonetheless".

Preceded by King of the Royal Mounted (1940)	Republic Serial; The Mysterious Doctor Satan (1940)	Succeeded by Adventures of Captain Marvel (1941)
Preceded by King of the Royal Mounted (1940)	Witney-English Serial; The Mysterious Doctor Satan (1940)	Succeeded by Adventures of Captain Marvel (1941)
