= Bathurst Lawn Memorial Park =

Jewish cemetery in Toronto, Ontario

Coordinates: 43.78902°N 79.44164°W

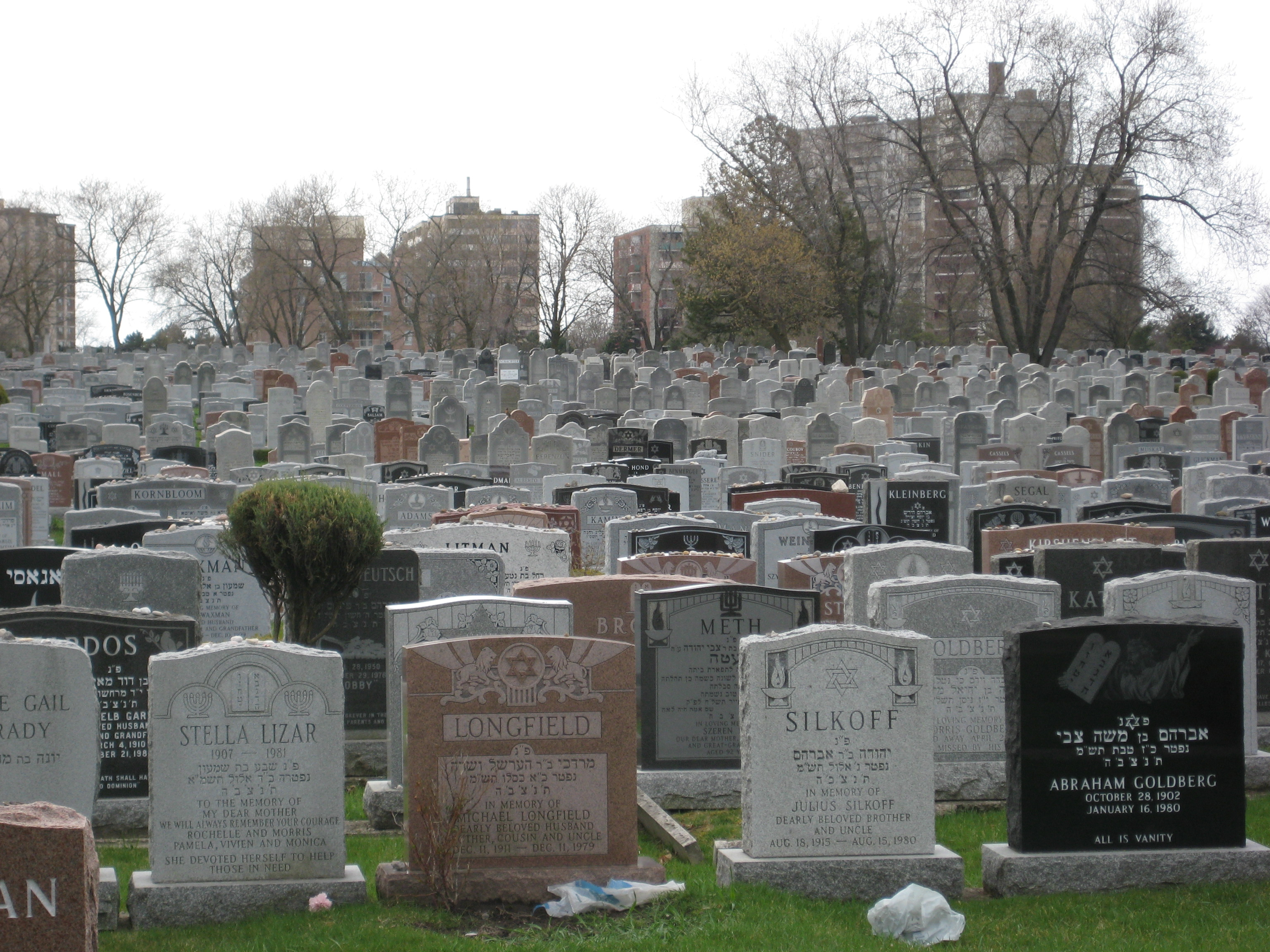
- Interactive map of Bathurst Lawn Memorial Park

Details
- Established: 1929
- Location: 6003 Bathurst Street, Toronto, Ontario
- Country: Canada
- Type: Jewish cemetery
- Owned by: Various congregations and mutual benefit societies
- Find a Grave: Bathurst Lawn Memorial Park

Bathurst Lawn Memorial Park is a Jewish cemetery in Toronto, Ontario, Canada. Located at 6033 Bathurst Street in the city's North York district, it is one of the largest Jewish burial grounds in the Greater Toronto Area.

Originally known as the Woods Cemetery, the land was acquired in the early 1930s by the Ivansker Mutual Benefit Society. Over time, sections of the cemetery were purchased by synagogues, landsmanshaftn, and Jewish mutual aid societies from across Toronto.

== History ==
The cemetery property originally belonged to a farmer named Woods, from whom the land derived its early informal name. In the early 1930s, the Ivansker Mutual Benefit Society purchased the property for use as a Jewish cemetery. The acquisition was organized by members of the society including Henry Lederman, Morris Lipton, Getzel Cohen, Alter Myerchick, Shmuel Kaplansky, and Shlomo Flodervasser.

Initially, forty-five synagogues and Jewish organizations acquired sections within the cemetery. By 2007, Bathurst Lawn Memorial Park consisted of fifty-five separately administered cemetery sections.

In its early years, access to the cemetery was difficult because Bathurst Street north of Sheppard Avenue was largely unpaved and crossed rural farmland. In 1956, representatives of the cemetery organizations coordinated the paving of internal roadways, marking one of the first major collective infrastructure projects undertaken by the cemetery's affiliated groups.

Bathurst Lawn Memorial Park was formally incorporated as a not-for-profit corporation on December 20, 1963.

== Organization ==
The cemetery is composed of sections owned or administered by numerous synagogues, landsmanshaftn, burial societies, and communal organizations. Bathurst Lawn Memorial Park provides maintenance, administrative, and burial services for the grounds as a whole.

The cemetery contains sections associated with congregations and organizations representing a broad range of Toronto Jewish communal life, including Orthodox, Conservative, and secular Jewish organizations such as the United Jewish Peoples' Order.

== Customs ==
As a Jewish cemetery, Bathurst Lawn Memorial Park follows traditional Jewish burial and mourning customs. Visitors commonly place small stones on graves as a sign of remembrance. Hand-washing stations are provided at cemetery exits in keeping with Jewish customs associated with leaving a burial ground.

== Notable burials ==
- Bernard Cowan (1922-1990), announcer and voice actor, best known for narrating the 1967 Spider-Man animated series
- Paula Drew (1925-2019), Hollywood actress and singer
- Marty Galin (1950-2024), broadcaster, actor, and food maven
- William Kashtan (1909-1993), leader of the Communist Party of Canada (1965-1988)
- Peter Kastner (1943–2008), actor
- Moe Koffman (1928-2001), jazz musician
- J. B. Salsberg (1902-1998), Member of the Ontario legislature (1943-1955), Toronto alderman, union organizer, and columnist.

== See also ==
- List of cemeteries in Toronto
- List of Jewish cemeteries in the Greater Toronto Area
- Mount Sinai Memorial Park
- Beth Tzedec Memorial Park
