= Lois Wilde =

American actress (1907–1995)

- Born: Edithea Lois Wild; August 14, 1907; Los Angeles, California, U.S.
- Died: February 16, 1995 (aged 87); North Attleboro, Massachusetts, U.S.
- Years active: 1936–1984
- Spouse(s): Leslie Major Sherriff (1925–1937) (divorced) (1 child); William Henry Snow (1938–1940) (divorced); Gilbert Denton Buck (1954–1986) (his death)
- Children: 1

Edithia Lois Wilde (August 14, 1907 – February 16, 1995) was an American actress, model, dancer, and beauty contest winner. She was most famous for appearing in B-Western and Action movies, and also known for her appearance in Undersea Kingdom (1936).

== Career ==
By the time she was 15 years old, Wilde was working as a model and was a ballet dancer at the Metropolitan Opera House. Artists for whom she posed included Howard Chandler Christy, Arnold Genthe, and Renee Prahar.

While dancing at the Metropolitan Opera, she was discovered by Florenz Ziegfeld, Jr., who hired her to perform in the 1923 Ziegfeld Follies. During this period, she "was once voted the most beautiful girl in the Follies organization."

Wilde co-starred with Ray Corrigan in Undersea Kingdom (1936) a serial from Republic Pictures. She also co-starred with Gene Autry in 1936's The Singing Cowboy.

== Personal life ==
On March 8, 1925, at eighteen years of age, Wilde married Leslie Major Sherriff, a banjo-player for the Paul Whiteman Band, in Brooklyn, New York. When she became pregnant with her first child, Marjorie, she left the Follies.

After moving from Atlantic City to Beverly Hills, she had a hysterectomy. While recovering in a wheelchair at a hair salon, a man approached her and asked if she had ever been in theater. This inspired her to pursue film roles.

Wilde and Sherriff divorced in 1937. In 1938, she married William Henry Snow, who was the president of a radio recording company.

== Death ==
Wilde died on February 16, 1995, in Attleboro, Massachusetts at the age of 87.

== Partial filmography ==
- Step on It (1936) as Connie Banning
- The Millionaire Kid (1936) as Kitty Malone
- Caryl of the Mountains (1936) as Caryl Foray
- The Singing Cowboy (1936) as Helen Blake
- Undersea Kingdom (1936) as Diana Compton
- Palm Springs (1936) as Undetermined Secondary Role (uncredited)
- Wildcat Trooper (1936) as Ruth Reynolds
- Stormy Trails (1936) as Connie Curlew
- Outcast (1937) as Mary Hallifax (uncredited)
- Nobody's Baby (1937) as Radio Station Receptionist (uncredited)
- Pick a Star (1937) as Minor Role (uncredited)
- Brothers of the West (1937) as Celia Chandler
- Hopalong Rides Again (1937) as Laura Peters
- Sky Racket (1937) as Sugar (uncredited)
- Danger Valley (1937) as Mickey Temple
- Love Nest (1951) as Landlady (uncredited)
- Steel Town (1952) as Nurse (uncredited)
- Ma and Pa Kettle at Waikiki (1955) as Boat Passenger (uncredited)
- Oh, God! You Devil (1984) as Casino Patron (uncredited)
