= Jack Dennett =

Canadian sports announcer (1916–1975)

- Born: May 30, 1916; Calgary, Alberta, Canada
- Died: August 27, 1975 (aged 59); Scarborough, Ontario, Canada
- Occupations: radio and television announcer
- Years active: 1930s–1975

Jack Dennett (May 30, 1916 – August 27, 1975) was a Canadian radio and television announcer.

He began his career in radio at the age of sixteen at CFAC in Calgary, beginning with various odd jobs such as filing, then began filling in for the regular news announcer when he did not appear for work.

== Career ==
In 1935, Dennett began conducting hockey interviews of players in the Regina Senior Hockey League.

He enlisted in the Canadian Forces in 1940 although was soon discharged due to suffering from stomach ulcers.

He returned to radio in Winnipeg at CKRC then shortly moved to Toronto in 1943 to take over newscasts at CFRB and eventually took over full-time slots in 1949.

He became a regular on the radio and television broadcasts for the Saturday Night Imperial Esso Hockey, later Hockey Night in Canada. He stopped broadcasting NHL radio games in 1962, continuing on television. Finally, he provided color commentary on Saturday night Vancouver Canucks home games in the 1970–71 season. He is also notable for having interviewed every Prime Minister from R.B. Bennett to Pierre Trudeau.

== Personal life and honors ==
He was diagnosed with bowel cancer and had surgery in January 1975 and returned to work, leaving just a month before his death. That same month, he was inducted into Canada's Sports Hall of Fame. He died at the age of 59 in Scarborough General Hospital on August 27, 1975.
