= Paula Drew =

American actress, singer and commercial spokesperson

Paula Drew (born Tamara Victoria Dubin; June 1, 1925 — July 30, 2019) was an American actress, singer, and commercial spokesperson, best known for appearing in Hollywood films in the 1940s and 1950s.

== Early years ==
Drew was born in Detroit as Tamara Victoria Dubin, the daughter of Mr. and Mrs. John Dubin, a factory superintendent and a nurse, respectively. Her father was from Bessarabia, and her mother was from Russia. She had two brothers. Drew graduated from Fordson High School and, while working as a secretary for an attorney, she took night classes at Fordson Junior college. She began "singing seriously" when she was 14 years old.

== Career ==
=== Early career ===
Drew sang in the chorus of the Civic Opera Company in Detroit until the company's producer promoted her to leading roles. She went on to perform in St. Louis Municipal Opera productions, including portraying Julie in Show Boat and Huguette in The Vagabond King.

=== Hollywood ===
Drew moved to New York City, where she attended the Juilliard School and worked as a model for John Robert Powers's agency, specializing in modeling "high-style, sophisticated type clothes". A lingering interest in performing led her to a job as a dancer at the El Morocco night club in New York, where a talent scout saw her and convinced her to take a Warner Bros. screen test. That test resulted in a contract in 1945 and an accompanying change from her birth name to her stage name.

When Warner Bros. dropped her option after a few months, Drew worked in a drugstore in Los Angeles. That was where producer Walter Wanger saw her, and she soon had another contract. Soon afterward, however, a "box-office crash" caused reduction of payrolls at Hollywood studios. Wanger "went out of business", and she returned to her Detroit home. By early 1950, however, her screen test had resurfaced, impressing producers who saw it. Eventually she signed another contract and was working for MGM by January 1950.

Drew appeared in the films Slightly Scandalous (1946), The Vigilantes Return (1947), Watch the Birdie (1950), and Danger Zone (1951). Her work on television included portraying Sharon Richard, the girlfriend of the main character on Front Page Detective.

=== Buffalo, New York ===
In 1954 Drew moved to Buffalo, New York, where she began making Milk for Health radio and television commercials. That stint lasted for eight years ending in 1961, and led to her becoming a member of the New York governor's Increased-Use-of-Milk Commission. In that role she traveled the world making lectures about the dairy situation and learning about dairy techniques and milk-drinking habits in other countries.

Drew was vice-president of Nevil Enterprises Inc., a plastic-manufacturing company based in Buffalo, for six years, doing public relations. After that, she was secretary to the president of Woldman Drug Stores for six years. In the late 1970s, she returned to television in commercials for Tops Friendly Markets.

== Personal life ==
Drew married Dr. Ira M. Altshuler, a psychiatrist, on May 4, 1949, in Bowling Green, Ohio. Forty-three days later he sued for divorce.

In Buffalo she was a member of the Allentown Village Society, Inc., which put on an annual art festival in the Allentown neighborhood of Buffalo.

She later married Hyman Eidlitz and moved to Toronto, where she died at the age of 94. She and Eidlitz are buried at Bathurst Lawn Memorial Park.
