= Marty Galin =

Canadian broadcaster and food maven (1950–2024)

- Born: Martin Gerald Galin; May 9, 1950; Toronto, Ontario, Canada
- Died: December 2, 2024 (aged 74)
- Resting place: Bathurst Lawn Memorial Park
- Occupations: Actor; comedian; radio host; television host; television producer; food maven
- Known for: Marty & Avrum: The Food Guys; Marty & Avrum: The Moveable Feast

Martin Gerald Galin (May 9, 1950 – December 2, 2024) was a Canadian actor, comedian, radio and television host, producer, restaurant reviewer and food maven. He was best known for his broadcasting partnership with Avrum Rosensweig. They hosted the Toronto radio programs The Marty & Avrum Restaurant Show and Marty & Avrum: The Food Guys, as well as the television series Marty & Avrum: The Moveable Feast.

== Early life ==
Galin was born in Toronto on May 9, 1950. He was the middle of three children. His father, David Galin, had multiple sclerosis and died when Galin was eleven years old.

Before becoming known as a food broadcaster, Galin worked as an actor and entertainer.

== Broadcasting and television ==
Galin began his broadcasting partnership with Rosensweig on Toronto radio station Talk 640 in October 1995. Their program, The Marty & Avrum Restaurant Show, discussed restaurants, cooking and the hospitality industry. The station's program director, Danny Kingsbury, described the pair as unconventional restaurant critics.

In 1998, they announced plans for a branded retail food line called Marty & Avrum Eat Here!, which they promoted through their radio program.

In 1999, Galin and Rosensweig moved from Talk 640 to CFRB, where they hosted a Saturday evening program from 6 to 7 p.m., until 2005, the "highly rated" Marty & Avrum: The Food Guys.

Galin and Rosensweig also worked together in television. In 2004, the Jewish Telegraphic Agency reported that they had produced five food-related television programs and appeared in three of them.

Their series Marty & Avrum: The Moveable Feast, produced by Generator Films, consisted of 26 half-hour episodes following the pair as they travelled across Canada in a motorhome and explored regional food and cultures. In 2002, Leader Media offered the series to international buyers at MIPTV. In late 2002, 13 additional half-hour episodes were produced for the Global Television Network.

In the late 2000s, Galin and Rosensweig wrote the "Moveable Feast" restaurant review column for Toronto commuter newspaper 24 hours. In 2008, the newspaper promoted their television programs Moveable Feast and Beer Buddies, which aired that year on SUN TV.

== Food products and community events ==
Galin later operated Marty G. Sensations, a food-product business associated with a number of charitable food initiatives. He helped establish Souperlicious with the Growers of the Holland Marsh and hosted its first two events.

In 2007, Galin organized an event in Scarborough billed as the World's Largest Salad. Later accounts credited the event with providing food for approximately 20,000 people. He also organized Currylicious, involving 15 Toronto restaurants and the distribution of approximately 15,000 meals to people in need.

In the spring of 2022, Galin was assaulted while riding his mobility scooter near Yonge and College streets in Toronto. He was punched in the face, breaking his glasses and injuring one of his eyes. Galin later said that the experience inspired him to respond through charitable work rather than retaliation.

In February 2023, Galin and chef Errico Giordano organized a new "Souperlicious" as a Valentine's Day food initiative with participating Toronto restaurants and community organizations. The project distributed free soup and bagels to people across the city, including those experiencing homelessness and poverty.

== Death ==
Galin died on December 2, 2024, at the age of 74. He was buried at Bathurst Lawn Memorial Park in Toronto.

In January 2025, The Canadian Jewish News included Galin in an edition of its obituary program Honourable Menschen, remembering him as a food enthusiast and broadcaster who had organized the World's Largest Salad.
