= The Affairs of Annabel =

1938 film by Benjamin Stoloff

- Directed by: Benjamin Stoloff; Lew Landers
- Written by: Bert Granet (writer); Charles Hoffman (story)
- Produced by: Lou Lusty; Lee S. Marcus
- Starring: Jack Oakie; Lucille Ball; Ruth Donnelly
- Cinematography: Russell Metty
- Edited by: Jack Hively
- Music by: Roy Webb
- Production company: RKO Radio Pictures
- Distributed by: RKO Radio Pictures
- Release date: September 9, 1938
- Running time: 68 minutes
- Country: United States
- Language: English

The Affairs of Annabel is a 1938 American comedy film directed by Benjamin Stoloff and starring Lucille Ball, Jack Oakie and Ruth Donnelly. It was produced and distributed by RKO Pictures. The film was followed by the sequel Annabel Takes a Tour the same year, also starring Oakie, Ball and Donnelly.

== Plot ==
Wonder Pictures studio publicity man Lanny Morgan has actress Annabel Allison taken to prison in order to generate publicity before the release of her new film. However, when Annabel is released one month later, she finds that nobody has noticed, and she has Lanny fired. But when he pays a struggling actress to pretend to be his sick mother, Annabel has Lanny rehired, and he immediately begins plotting his next stunt.

The head of Wonder Pictures informs Annabel that her film has been canceled, and that she is to star in a new film, The Maid and the Man. Lanny arranges to have her work as Mary, a maid for the Fletchers, their teenage son Robert and inventor Major. While Robert becomes infatuated with Annabel, she is expected to cook and clean for the family, so she calls on Lanny to help. Meanwhile, the investors interested in one of Major's inventions, a rubber ring placed around a plate so that it will bounce rather than break when dropped, appear in the morning newspaper as robbers. They are in fact waiting for their own publicity to dissipate so that they can make a getaway.

Back at Wonder Pictures, The Maid and the Man has been scrapped, but when Lanny calls Annabel to tell her, she answers that she cannot leave. Though at first confused, he finds Annabel's police mug shot in the paper along with the robbers, and forms a plan to outfit 50 extras as policemen. As they march toward the house firing blanks, the robbers return fire with real bullets, and the extras scatter. Lanny sneaks into the house alone but is captured.

When the real policemen arrive, the robbers try to escape, using Lanny and Allison as shields. Instead, Annabel uses her martial arts training to throw one of the robbers to the ground, while Lanny bites the other.

Annabel returns to Wonder Pictures and is disappointed to find that The Maid and the Man has been replaced by The Diamond Smuggler, in which she is to play the lead. On her way out, Annabel collects a gift that Lanny had arranged for her to receive, and is apprehended when the police open it to discover the precious jewels inside. Lanny watches from the front of the new billboard for The Diamond Smuggler as Annabel is driven away screaming.

== Cast ==
- Jack Oakie as Lanny Morgan
- Lucille Ball as Annabel Allison
- Ruth Donnelly as Josephine
- Bradley Page as Howard Webb
- Fritz Feld as Vladimir Dukov
- Thurston Hall as Major
- Elisabeth Risdon as Mrs. Margaret Fletcher
- Granville Bates as Jim Fletcher
- James Burke as Officer Muldoon
- Lee Van Atta as Robert Fletcher
- Anthony Warde as Bailey aka Rogers
- Leona Roberts as Mrs. Hurley
- Charles Coleman as The Butler, Perkins
- Brooks Benedict as Man in Webb's Office
- Stanley Blystone as Cop
- Maurice Cass as Dr. Rubnick
- Claire Du Brey as Convict
- Mildred Gover as Scarlet, the Maid
- Kane Richmond as Detective
- Madame Sul-Te-Wan as Benzedrina, a Convict
- John Sutton as Man at newsstand

== Reception ==
In a contemporary review for The New York Times, critic Frank S. Nugent speculated that The Affairs of Annabel would be the first in a series: "A promising first, we might add; in a light farce vein, with some flip players in it. ... Between them, and with the help of a smartly written script, they have created an amusing trifle about a movie actress and a press agent with a Svengali complex. ... Miss Ball, who is rapidly becoming one of our brightest comediennes, plays it broadly and without a disruptive trace of whimsy."
