= Jerry Agar =

American radio host

Jerry Agar is a conservative talk radio personality. Since 2010, he has been host of the Jerry Agar Show on CFRB.

== Life and career ==
Agar was born in Manitoba. After years of working as a disc jockey in Canada he moved to the United States and became a talk radio host at WPTF in Raleigh, North Carolina in 2000. He subsequently moved to KMBZ in Kansas City, WABC-AM in New York City and WLS-AM and WGN-AM in Chicago. He was a substitute host on G. Gordon Liddy's satellite radio show and Mark Levin's show. In February 2010, Agar joined CFRB in Toronto as host of The Jerry Agar Show on weekday mornings. He hosted a program on the Sun News Network from 3 to 5 pm Eastern weekdays, until the station's demise in 2015, and is a regular Tuesday columnist for the Toronto Sun.

Agar has published op-ed pieces in various American newspapers and was a featured columnist for the Kansas City Business Magazine. He was also a multimedia fellow with the Illinois Policy Institute.

== Beliefs ==
Agar has shown skepticism about the effects of man-made global warming on polar bears and has written many blog entries critical of the scientific consensus on global warming.

Agar is a strong advocate for the war on drugs when it comes to hard drugs like crack and heroin and has been very critical of the safe injection site Insite, the only legal supervised injection site in North America. This position has been the source of criticism.

Agar has also been critical of the Province of Ontario's decision to disallow Catholic school boards' banning of Gay Straight Alliances.
