= Ted Woloshyn =

Canadian broadcaster

- Born: December 1953 (age 72)
- Occupation: broadcaster
- Years active: 1974–present

Ted Woloshyn (born December 1953) is a Canadian broadcaster, based in Toronto. He hosted The Ted Woloshyn Show, mornings from 5:30 to 8:30 on CFRB-AM in Toronto, Ontario, Canada from 3 November 1996 until 15 December 2006. He hosted Saturdays with Ted from 12 to 3pm on Newstalk1010 from 2010 until 2021. He previously worked for Toronto area stations CFNY-FM, Q107 and CKFM-FM. Woloshyn currently lives in Mississauga, Ontario.

Woloshyn started his radio career in 1974 at CHIC (which became CFNY in 1976) in Brampton. He moved on to work in Peterborough, Montreal, Hamilton, and finally Toronto. He hosted various shows on CBC Television's Toronto affiliate CBLT in the 1980s including Off the Wol, and It's Only Rock'n Roll and also contributed to CBLT's local news program. He was also a contributor to Midday and The Journal on the full CBC network and to Global News on the Global Television Network.

In 1981, Woloshyn released the comedy album It's Not the Heat...It's the Humility. The following year, he received a Juno Award nomination for Comedy Album of the Year.

He began hosting the CFRB morning show in November 1996, following in the footsteps of the legendary Wally Crouter. Little more than a month after celebrating his tenth anniversary on The Ted Woloshyn Show, he announced his leaving because it was time to move on. CFRB announced on air that Woloshyn was retiring to spend more time with his family. He subsequently revealed that he had actually been fired by CFRB and was not retiring.

Woloshyn has written a monthly opinion column in the Toronto Sun from 2007 until 2021. Woloshyn hosted Saturday with Ted Woloshyn on Newstalk 1010 (CFRB-AM) from 2010 until 2021. On February 1, 2021, Woloshyn was one of at least 210 people laid off by Bell Media from its properties across Canada.

Woloshyn is Ukrainian-Canadian.
