= The Singing Cowboy (film) =

1936 film by Mack V. Wright

- Theatrical release poster
- Directed by: Mack V. Wright
- Screenplay by: Dorrell McGowan; Stuart E. McGowan
- Story by: Tom Gibson
- Produced by: Nat Levine
- Starring: Gene Autry; Smiley Burnette; Lois Wilde; Lon Chaney Jr.
- Cinematography: Edgar Lyons; William Nobles
- Edited by: Lester Orlebeck
- Music by: Harry Grey (supervisor)
- Production company: Republic Pictures
- Distributed by: Republic Pictures
- Release date: May 11, 1936 (U.S.)
- Running time: 56 minutes
- Country: United States
- Language: English

The Singing Cowboy is a 1936 American Western film directed by Mack V. Wright and starring Gene Autry, Smiley Burnette, Lois Wilde and Lon Chaney Jr. Based on a story by Tom Gibson, the film is about a cowboy who decides to sing on television in order to raise money for the orphaned daughter of his former boss who was murdered.

== Plot ==
Ranch owner Steve Stevens (John Van Pelt) is shot by his greedy partner, Martin (Lon Chaney Jr.), who then sets fire to Stevens' barn. Stevens' last request is for cowboy Gene Autry (Gene Autry) to look after his daughter, Lou Ann (Ann Gillis), who was trampled by a horse during the barn fire and paralyzed. Martin befriends Lou Ann, hoping to gain possession of the secret gold mine beneath the Stevens' ranch. Lou Ann does not suspect Martin in her father's murder.

Needing to raise $10,000 for Lou Ann's spinal surgery, Gene confidently wrangles his way into a promotional job with Covered Wagon Coffee Company and travels in a caravan equipped with television equipment, broadcasting a Covered Wagon Coffee show to small towns in the West. In his home town of Plainesville, Gene organizes an amateur singing contest. Helen Blake (Lois Wilde), the daughter of his boss Henry Blake (Harvey Clark), auditions without her father's permission and without Gene knowing her real identity. Concerned about his daughter, Henry Blake sends Helen's fiancée, Herbert Trenton (Earl Eby), after her. With the date of Lou Ann's surgery quickly approaching, Gene receives a bank advance on his radio contract to cover the cost.

Martin steals Gene's wagon, unaware that Helen is hiding inside. This fouls Gene's bank advance and it is cancelled. Helen secretly sends an "S.O.S." signal using the equipment in the stolen wagon, and Gene is able to find the wagon and free her. Martin's gang follows Gene and Helen into town where they are arrested. Gene collects the reward money offered by Trenton for Helen's safe return, getting enough money to cover Lou Ann's surgery. Thinking that Gene is interested only in her money, Helen goes back to Trenton.

Gene eventually captures Martin, and after his men reveal his guilt in connection with the secret gold mine, he is also arrested. After performing in the recovered coffee caravan, Gene rushes to the Plainesville courthouse and saves Helen from marrying Trenton. Gene and Helen sing "Rainbow Trail" while a recovering Lou Ann looks on.

== Cast ==
- Gene Autry as himself
- Smiley Burnette as Frog Millhouse
- Lois Wilde as Helen Blake
- Lon Chaney Jr. as Martin
- Champion as Champion, Gene's Horse
- Ann Gillis as Lou Ann Stevens
- Earle Hodgins as Professor Sandow
- Harvey Clark as Henry Blake
- John Van Pelt as Steve Stevens
- Earl Eby as Herbert Trenton
- Ken Cooper as Second Henchman, Stevens' Barn
- Harrison Greene as Mayor Hawkins
- Wes Warner as Pete, Musical Ranchhand
- Jack Rockwell as Sheriff
- Tracy Layne as Henchmen Leader Kirk

== Production ==
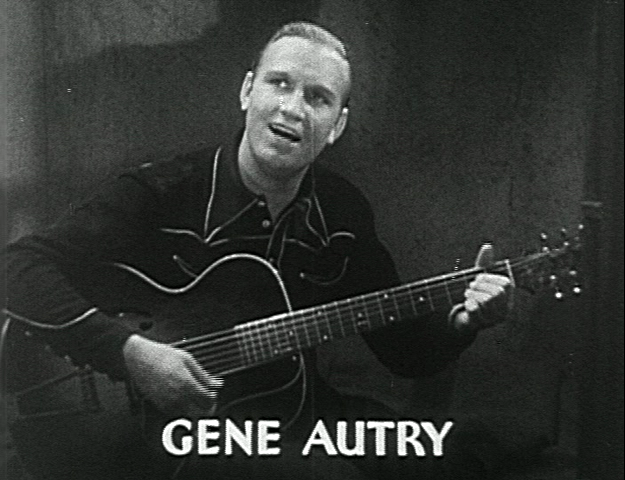
Gene Autry in 1936

=== Stuntwork ===
- Ken Cooper
- Joe Yrigoyen

=== Filming locations ===
- Agoura, California, US
- Brandeis Ranch, Chatsworth, Los Angeles, California, US
- Iverson Ranch, 1 Iverson Lane, Chatsworth, Los Angeles, California, US

=== Soundtrack ===
- "There's an Empty Cot in the Bunkhouse Tonight" (Gene Autry) by Gene Autry and cowhands
- "Ya Hoo" by Gene Autry, Smiley Burnette, Art Davis, Frankie Marvin, Jack Kirk, Wes Warner, and other cowhands
- "We're on the Air" (Tibor Bencze) by the cowhands
- "True Blue Bill" (Gene Autry, Frankie Marvin, George Rainey) by Gene Autry and cowhands
- "Rainbow Trail" (Smiley Burnette, Oliver Drake) by Gene Autry and Lois Wilde
- "Rainbow Trail" (reprise) (Smiley Burnette, Oliver Drake) by Lois Wilde
- "Rainbow Trail" (reprise) (Smiley Burnette, Oliver Drake) by Gene Autry
- "Down in Slumberland" by Gene Autry at the hospital
- "Scattin'" by Fred 'Snowflake' Toones and two unidentified African Americans (instrumental)
- "The New Jassackaphone" (Tibor Bencze) by Smiley Burnette
- "Washboard and Room" by Frankie Marvin on a washboard
- "My Old Saddle Pal" (Gene Autry, Oddie Thompson) by Gene Autry
- "I'll Be Thinking of You, Little Gal" (Gene Autry) by Gene Autry and Earle Hodgins
