= Second Wife (1936 film) =

1936 American drama film directed by Edward Killy

- Directed by: Edward Killy
- Screenplay by: Thomas Lennon; Fulton Oursler (play)
- Produced by: Lee S. Marcus; William LeBaron
- Starring: Gertrude Michael; Walter Abel; Erik Rhodes
- Cinematography: Nicholas Musuraca
- Edited by: George Crone
- Music by: Alberto Colombo
- Production company: RKO Radio Pictures
- Distributed by: RKO Radio Pictures
- Release date: August 21, 1936
- Running time: 59 minutes
- Country: United States
- Language: English
- Budget: $68,000
- Box office: $197,000

Second Wife is a 1936 American drama film directed by Edward Killy and starring Gertrude Michael, Walter Abel and Erik Rhodes. It was produced and distributed by RKO Pictures.

== Cast ==
- Gertrude Michael as Virginia Howard
- Walter Abel as Kenneth Carpenter Sr.
- Erik Rhodes as Dave Bennet
- Emma Dunn as Mrs. Brown
- Lee Van Atta as Kenneth Carpenter Jr.
- Florence Fair as Mrs. Stephenson
- Brenda Fowler as Mrs. Anderson
- Frank Reicher as Headmaster
- George P. Breakston as Jerry Stephenson
- Ward Bond as Politician

== Reception ==
It made a profit of $58,000.
