= Front Page Detective =

- Genre: Crime drama
- Directed by: Arnold Wester
- Starring: Edmund Lowe; Paula Drew; Frank Jenks
- Country of origin: United States
- Original language: English
- No. of seasons: 2
- No. of episodes: 46

Production
- Executive producers: Jerry Fairbanks; Riley Jackson
- Cinematography: Lester Shore
- Running time: 30 minutes
- Production company: Jerry Fairbanks Productions

Original release
- Network: DuMont
- Release: July 6, 1951 – November 13, 1953

Front Page Detective is an American crime drama series which aired on the DuMont Television Network on Fridays at 9:30 p.m. ET from July 6, 1951, to September 19, 1952, and in October and November 1953. The program was usually syndicated to local stations, but on these two occasions it ran on the DuMont network.

== Synopsis ==
Front Page Detective stars Edmund Lowe as David Chase, a newspaper columnist who helps police solve especially difficult mysteries. The title derived from a popular true-crime magazine of the same name, and stories were based on material from the magazine.

Other cast members were Frank Jenks as Lieutenant Rodney, Paula Drew as Sharon Richards, and George Pembroke as Lieutenant Andrews.

== Production ==
Jerry Fairbanks was the producer and distributor, and Arnold Wester was the director. Gene Levitt and Robert Mitcher were the writers. Episodes were filmed in Los Angeles on sound stages, with stock film used for exterior shots.

== Episode status ==
UCLA Film and Television Archive has 17 episodes of this series. Internet Archive and TV4U also have one episode each.

Unlike many other programs which aired on DuMont, the series was produced on film by an outside production company. A few episodes are available on DVD and online, usually as part of early TV compilations.

== Critical response ==
The trade publication Variety described one episode of Front Page Detective as "a dull affair, which the actors seemed to realize and refuse to help." The review called the actors' performances "unimaginative" and said that work behind the cameras "was slipshod and oftentimes embarrassing."

A review in The New York Times of the series's initial episode found that its drama paled in comparison to that of the Kefauver Commission hearings that were then being televised. The reviewer suggested that the killer was fairly obvious and described the episode as "too cut and dried". A review in the trade publication Variety panned the June 27, 1952, episode, describing it as "a dull affair which the actors seemed to realize and refuse to help". The review also noted "slipshod and oftimes embarrassing" off-camera operations.

== See also ==
- List of programs broadcast by the DuMont Television Network
- List of surviving DuMont Television Network broadcasts
- 1951-52 United States network television schedule

== Bibliography ==
- David Weinstein, The Forgotten Network: DuMont and the Birth of American Television (Philadelphia: Temple University Press, 2004) ISBN 1-59213-245-6
- Alex McNeil, Total Television, Fourth edition (New York: Penguin Books, 1980) ISBN 0-14-024916-8
- Tim Brooks and Earle Marsh, The Complete Directory to Prime Time Network and Cable TV Shows 1946–Present, Ninth edition (New York: Ballantine Books, 2007) ISBN 978-0-345-49773-4
