= Wildcat Trooper =

1936 film by Elmer Clifton

- Theatrical release poster
- Directed by: Elmer Clifton
- Screenplay by: Joseph O'Donnell
- Based on: The Midnight Call by James Oliver Curwood
- Produced by: Maurice Conn
- Starring: Kermit Maynard; Hobart Bosworth; Fuzzy Knight; Lois Wilde; Jim Thorpe; Yakima Canutt; Eddie Phillips; John Merton; Frank Hagney; Roger Williams
- Cinematography: Arthur Reed
- Edited by: Richard G. Wray
- Production company: Conn Pictures Corporation
- Distributed by: Ambassador Pictures
- Release date: July 1, 1936
- Running time: 60 minutes
- Country: United States
- Language: English

Wildcat Trooper is a 1936 American adventure film directed by Elmer Clifton and written by Joseph O'Donnell. The film stars Kermit Maynard, Hobart Bosworth, Fuzzy Knight, Lois Wilde, Jim Thorpe, Yakima Canutt, Eddie Phillips, John Merton, Frank Hagney and Roger Williams. The film was released on July 1, 1936, by Ambassador Pictures.

== Plot ==
RCMP Sergeant Farrell arrests a criminal known as the Raven and finds a letter of introduction to do mayhem for a criminal enterprise. Farrell uses the letter to impersonate the Raven where he is hired to steal furs from two feuding fur trappers. Farrell continually wears his uniform explaining that by impersonating a Mountie he will be trusted by everyone.

== Cast ==
- Kermit Maynard as Sgt. Gale Farrell
- Hobart Bosworth as Dr. Martin
- Fuzzy Knight as Constable Pat O'Hearne
- Lois Wilde as Ruth Reynolds
- Jim Thorpe as Indian
- Yakima Canutt as The Raven
- Eddie Phillips as Bob Reynolds
- John Merton as Henry McClain
- Frank Hagney as Jim Foster
- Roger Williams as Slim Arnold
