= Ray Sonin =

British-Canadian radio broadcaster and presenter

Ray Sonin OBE
- Born: June 23, 1907; London, England
- Died: August 20, 1991 (aged 84); Toronto, Ontario, Canada
- Occupations: Reporter; editor; author; composer; broadcaster
- Years active: 1958–1991
- Employers: BBC; New Musical Express; CFRB
- Known for: Down Memory Lane; Calling all Britons
- Television: One for the Sonins
- Spouses: Eileen (m. 1938; died 1977); June (m. 1978)

Ray Sonin (23 June 1907–20 August 1991) was a British-born broadcaster on Toronto radio station CFRB who hosted several popular programs, including Calling All Britons and Down Memory Lane. In the UK he was an influential music journalist and editor, starting at Melody Maker and then moving to its rival, the New Musical Express.

== Life ==
Born in London on June 23, 1907, he became a reporter at the age of 17. He wrote several mystery novels prior to World War II, and joined the BBC as a writer in 1940, producing scripts for such personalities as Edward G. Robinson and Noël Coward during the war years. He also joined the staff of Melody Maker in 1939, where he progressed to news editor and then spent 10 years as managing editor until 1951.

A substantial pools win allowed Sonin to ease back from work after World War II and work on writing two further mystery novels, and one young adult science fiction novel. Sonin was also a respected composer whose work was recorded by Vera Lynn and Mantovani.

In 1952, Sonin was lured back into journalism with an offer to become the editor of The Musical Express - a weekly publication of four pages which contained the Top Twenty list of the sales of sheet music. This list was used by Radio Luxembourg during the early 1950s for their pioneering Sunday night programme. Under Sonin's editorship, the newspaper was relaunched as The 'New' Musical Express in March 1952 and began publishing artist interviews, industry gossip, and compiled a top 20 list based on record sales. Sales of the magazine jumped by 50% by the time The New Musical Express was sold to Odhams.

Ray Sonin emigrated to Canada from London in 1957. Shortly thereafter, he put his life savings into a Canadian equivalent of The Musical Express called Music World and he lost every cent.

His misfortune with the Canadian music magazine was a blessing to his estimated 100,000 listeners, who tuned into Toronto radio station CFRB 1010 for his program Calling All Britons at 4:10 pm every Saturday for three hours of music, news and sports from the United Kingdom. The programme ran on CFRB for 33 years, until Sonin's death in 1991. Down Memory Lane ran on weeknights, and featured music popular in Great Britain during the 1940s and 1950s.

In 1984, Sonin was made a member of the Order of the British Empire at Buckingham Palace by Queen Elizabeth II, an honour that Sonin called, "the greatest moment in my life." He is also credited with having a great ear for talent. Long before Beatlemania swept the globe he is credited as the first program host in North America to play the Fab Four in the fall or early winter of 1962.

His first wife, Eileen, died in 1977 following 39 years of marriage. He then met June, who became his second wife, whom he married at Toronto's Old City Hall in 1978. He had no children.

He died on August 20, 1991, of an apparent heart attack.

His widow, June Sonin, brought Calling All Britons back to the airwaves in 1993, co-hosting it on CHWO with Ken Stanley until her own death in 1999.

== Bibliography ==
=== Fiction ===
- — (1933). The death pack: A mystery thriller. London: Fenland Press. OCLC 503853813.
- — (1935). The Mystery of the Tailor's Dummy. London: G.G. Harrap. OCLC 503853862.
- — (1940). The dance band mystery. London: Quality Press. OCLC 12708820.
- — (1952). The adventures of Captain "Space" Kingley. Illustrated by R.W. Jobson. London: Sampson Low, Marston & Co. OCLC 18162091.
- — (1953). Murder in print. London: Jenkins. OCLC 30201708.
- — (1954). Twice times murder. London: Jenkins. OCLC 30168752.

=== Non-fiction ===
- —; Rex Morton (1955). The Johnnie Ray Story. London: Twentieth Century Publications. OCLC 2316980.
- Sara Nebig Veffer (1960). Hidden for a thousand days. As told to Ray Sonin. Toronto: Ryerson. OCLC 7416659.
