= Jim Richards (broadcaster) =

Canadian radio personality (born 1966)

Jim Richards (born January 11, 1966, James Richard McGorty) is a Canadian radio personality.

Richards studied radio broadcasting at Loyalist College in Belleville, Ontario. In 1988 he launched his radio career at CJTN in Trenton, Ontario, close to Belleville; he also worked at CIHI in Fredericton, New Brunswick, CJCH in Halifax, Nova Scotia. He hosted a popular morning show at CFJB-FM in Barrie, Ontario, north of Toronto, and was nominated for medium-market morning show of the year in 1990.

From the early 1990s to 1996, he worked periodic shifts including a Saturday morning show on Toronto sports talk station CJCL. Sometime during his early days with The Fan, he was asked to change his name to something "less ethnic" and went with a derivation of his middle name, switching to Jim Richards as his on air name.

At the Fan, he gave George Stroumboulopoulos his first exposure as an on-air personality; the young board operator contributed regularly to Richards' shows. In 1994, a difficult year for sports media with both a Major League Baseball strike and National Hockey League lockout, the station gave Richards a midday shift with sports broadcaster Barb DiGiulio.

In the summer of 1996, he left the Fan to work at Toronto rock station Q107 and the Rock Radio Network, hosting overnight rock music programming syndicated across Canada for the latter.

He joined news-talk station CFRB in 1997. At CFRB, he hosted late evening talk show The Nightside. In 2004, Mark Elliot took over The Nightside and Richards moved to an earlier shift, weekday evenings from 8 to 11. Known officially as The Jim Richards Show, Richards also billed it as the "Showgram", "The Nighttime Friendly", "The Feel-Good Edition" and "The Three Hours of Love." In late 2005, with the departure of Michael Coren, Richards's shift briefly moved from 7 to 10 for several weeks until Kelly Cutrara was appointed Coren's replacement and Richards returned to the 8 to 11 slot. Richards was on the 10am-noon and 1pm-3pm time slot, to replace Leslie Roberts and Paul and Carol Mott respectively. He eventually hosted the 12pm to 2pm time slot on weekdays. On February 1, 2021, Richards's afternoon show ended and he was reported to have been included in the layoff of 210 employees at Bell Media properties across Canada. However, he returned to the air on March 1, 2021 as host of The Late Showgram with Jim Richards a new 5-hour long national overnight show produced at CFRB and carried by Bell Media Radio IHeartRadio talk radio network. At its launch, the program was being carried by CFRB Toronto, CJAD Montreal, CKTB St. Catharines, CFAX Victoria, CFRA Ottawa, CKFR Kelowna, CKLW Windsor, and CJBK London.

The overnight show was discontinued and Richards, as of 2024, hosts the late afternoon show from 4-6PM.
