= Hopalong Rides Again =

1937 film by Lesley Selander

- Theatrical release poster
- Directed by: Lesley Selander
- Screenplay by: Norman Houston
- Produced by: Harry Sherman
- Starring: William Boyd; George "Gabby" Hayes; Russell Hayden; Nora Lane; Harry Worth; Lois Wilde; Billy King
- Cinematography: Russell Harlan
- Edited by: Robert B. Warwick Jr.
- Production company: Paramount Pictures
- Distributed by: Paramount Pictures
- Release date: September 3, 1937
- Running time: 65 minutes
- Country: United States
- Language: English

Hopalong Rides Again is a 1937 American Western film directed by Lesley Selander and written by Norman Houston. The film stars William Boyd, George "Gabby" Hayes, Russell Hayden, Nora Lane, Harry Worth, Lois Wilde and Billy King. The film was released on September 3, 1937, by Paramount Pictures.

== Plot ==
Hopalong, Lucky, and Windy are working for the Bar 20 Ranch owned by Buck Peters. Buck's niece, Laura, and his nephew, Artie, also live there. Lucky is in love with Laura. Buck needs cash and tells Hopalong to bring some cattle to Fort Hastings. They must arrive there in 10 days to fulfill contract terms. In order to get them there on time, the cattle have to be driven through the Black Butte area where the previous year rustlers stampeded the Bar 20 cattle leading to the loss of many cattle and the death of several of Hopalong's men. Nora Blake lives in the Black Butte area and Hopalong is smitten by her. It turns out that Nora's brother, Professor Hepburne, is the ruthless leader of the rustlers. Before the cattle drive Hopalong meets the Professor when he stops by the Bar 20 to get his horse reshod. Windy notices that the Professor is carrying a load of dynamite. The cattle drive begins. Buck's nephew pleads with his uncle to go on the drive. Buck relents and Artie rides after the cattle drive. Hopalong assigns him to the chuck wagon with Windy. As the drive is going through the Black Butte area, Hepburne sets off the dynamite. The cattle stampede. 200 are picked off by the rustlers. Windy and Artie are right under the area that was dynamited and save themselves by getting under the chuck wagon. But Artie is hurt. In the explosion a piece of the dynamite case lands near Windy. Hopalong then knows that Hepburne is the rustler chief. He lays a trap. He puts Lucky in charge of the drive. He is to take the cattle to Fort Hasting and come back to the Butte with the cash. Meanwhile, Hopalong goes to visit Nora. He lets Hepburne overhear that Lucky will be coming through the Butte with the cash. Windy who is taking care of Artie goes to get water and discovers the rustlers and the cattle. When he comes back to Artie, Artie has tried to get up and hurt himself again. So Windy can't go as Hopalong wished to get Buck to bring the ranch people back to fight the rustlers. But when Windy is not looking, Artie gets on his horse and goes back to the ranch to bring the reinforcements. Between Hopalong, Lucky, Windy and the ranch hands the rustlers are defeated. Hepburne was angered when one of his men talked back. Hepburne shoots the talker back. Hepburne carries a box of dynamite up one of the hills but the fellow he shot shoots Hepburne. The shot sets off the dynamite. So that is the end of Hepburne. Hopalong believes Nora will never know her brother was a villain. Good triumphs over evil.

== Cast ==
- William Boyd as Hopalong Cassidy
- George "Gabby" Hayes as Windy Halliday
- Russell Hayden as Lucky Jenkins
- Nora Lane as Nora Blake
- Harry J. Worth as Professor Horace Hepburn
- Lois Wilde as Laura Peters
- Billy King as Artie Peters
- William Duncan as Buck Peters
- Jack Rutherford as Henchman Blackie
- Ernie Adams as Henchman Keno
- John Beach as Pet
