= Mark Elliot (radio host) =

Canadian broadcaster

Nils Johanson
- Born: Nils Fleming Johanson; December 24, 1953; Toronto, Ontario, Canada
- Died: January 11, 2019 (aged 65); St. Catharines, Ontario, Canada
- Other names: Mark Elliot, Ed Mitchell, John Frick
- Occupations: Broadcaster, talk show host, addictions counsellor
- Partner: Jarrett Rainhard

Nils Fleming Johanson (December 24, 1953 – January 11, 2019), known professionally as Mark Elliot, was a Canadian broadcaster and addictions counsellor. He was a late night talk radio host of multiple programs on radio station CFRB 1010 in Toronto. Earlier in his career, he was a popular disk jockey at Top 40 stations in various Canadian cities including Toronto, Winnipeg, Ottawa, and Windsor, Ontario.

From 2003 to February 2007, he hosted the general interest talk show The Nightside; in 2005, it was the highest-rated late night radio show in Canada. From 2001 until December 2016, he hosted People Helping People on Saturday nights from 11 p.m. to 2 a.m. EST on CFRB Toronto and CJAD Montreal, a phone-in show dedicated to addictions and addiction recovery. Elliot was a recovering alcoholic, drug abuser, and compulsive gambler.

Elliot was the only openly gay host on CFRB, where he came out on air. Politically left-wing, he presented a somewhat challenging figure for the historically conservative station.

== Career ==
Elliot's radio career began at what was then CHIC radio in Brampton, a Toronto suburb, in 1974. He moved on to work as a radio disk jockey at CFOM, the last English-language commercial radio station in Quebec City, Quebec, and then in Winnipeg, Manitoba. At his next home, in Ottawa, he became a legendary evening Top 40 host and local celebrity on CFRA and CFGO. In 1987, a sympathetic employer fired Elliot rather than let his position continue to enable his addictions. Retrospectively, Elliot later praised her action for saving his life.

Elliot moved to Windsor, Ontario, where he received treatment at Brentwood Recovery Home. He returned to the air with the CHUM radio group serving Windsor and Detroit.

With executive producer Warren Cosford, Elliot initiated People Helping People on Windsor's CKLW in 1995, later syndicating it to Toronto's Talk 640. Both stations dropped his program before he was picked up by CFRB, Canada's most listened-to commercial talk radio station, first to do PHP on weekends, and eventually, in 2003, to take on The Nightside after its longtime host Jim Richards moved to an earlier timeslot.

While many other electronic media shut down, Elliot was on air during the Northeast blackout of 2003, providing information and reassurance to untold numbers of listeners in Southern Ontario.

Elliot also worked as a counsellor with the Salvation Army Harbour Light Treatment Centre, and was a member of Alcoholics Anonymous.

== Personal life and death ==
Elliot was born in Toronto and grew up in Weston, then a suburb of the city. He lived in the Church and Wellesley area of downtown Toronto for a number of years before moving to the Niagara Peninsula later in life.

He suffered from heart trouble in his last years and was hospitalized at the end of 2018 after suffering two heart attacks. He developed pneumonia and was put in a medically induced coma before dying on January 11, 2019.
