= Undersea Kingdom =

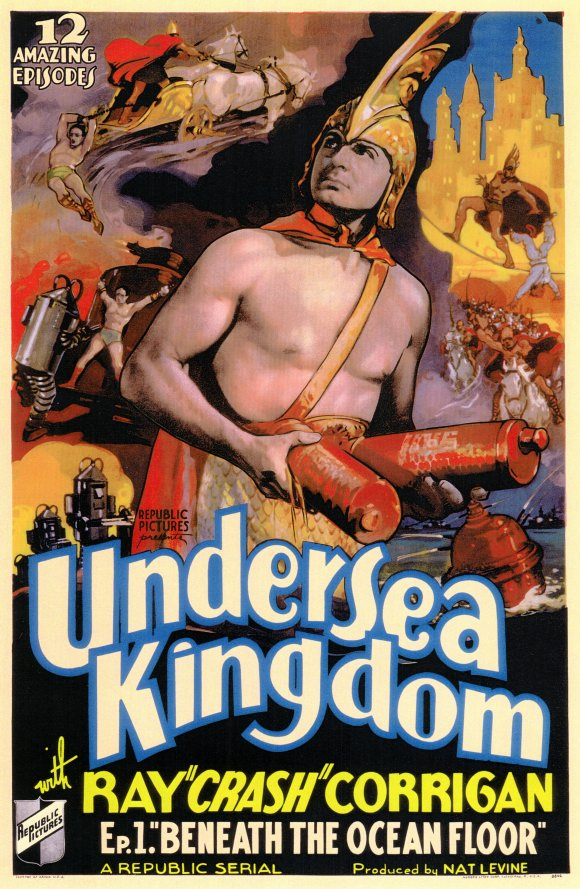
- Directed by: B. Reeves Eason; Joseph Kane
- Written by: Tracy Knight; John Rathmell; Maurice Geraghty; Oliver Drake
- Produced by: Nat Levine
- Starring: Ray Corrigan; Lois Wilde; Monte Blue; William Farnum; C. Montague Shaw; Lee Van Atta; Lon Chaney Jr
- Cinematography: Edgar Lyons; William Nobles
- Edited by: Dick Fantl; Helene Turner
- Music by: Harry Grey
- Distributed by: Republic Pictures
- Release date: May 30, 1936 (serial)
- Running time: 12 chapters (226 minutes) (serial); 100 minutes (TV)
- Country: United states
- Language: English
- Budget: $81,924 (negative cost: $99,222)

Undersea Kingdom, Chapter 1: Beneath the Ocean Floor

Undersea Kingdom (1936) is a Republic Pictures 12 chapter film serial released in response to Universal's Flash Gordon. It was the second of the sixty-six serials made by Republic. In 1966, the serial was edited into a 100-minute television film titled Sharad of Atlantis.

Following a suspicious earthquake, and detecting a series of signals, Professor Norton leads an expedition, including Lt. Crash Corrigan and reporter Diana Compton, in his rocket submarine to the suspected location of Atlantis. Finding the lost continent, they become embroiled in an Atlantean civil war between Sharad (with his White Robes) and the usurper Unga Khan (with his Black Robes). Khan wishes to conquer Atlantis and then destroy the upper world with earthquakes generated by his Disintegrator. Thus, he will rule the world unless he can be stopped in time.

The star of the serial is Ray "Crash" Corrigan, using that screen name for the first time. The name was created to sound similar to "Flash Gordon", in one of many similarities. Formerly a stunt man – he was the person swinging on vines in Tarzan the Ape Man (1932) – Corrigan went on to use this screen name for the rest of his career in serials and B-Westerns.

The first two chapters of the serial were mocked on the TV show Mystery Science Theater 3000 in July/August 1992.

== Plot ==
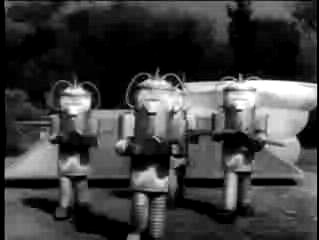
Unga Khan's Volkites emerging from "The Juggernaut"

The plot involves the main character "Crash" Corrigan trying to stop an evil tyrant ruler of Atlantis from conquering the lost continent and then the entire upper world.

Lieutenant Crash Corrigan, in his last year at the United States Naval Academy in Annapolis, Maryland, is invited by Billy Norton to visit his father, Professor Norton, after a wrestling match. At their house, the professor is demonstrating his new invention, which can detect and prevent (at short range) earthquakes, to Diana Compton and his theory about regular tremours from the area where Atlantis used to be.

When Atlantean tyrant Unga Khan and his Black Robe army turn their Disintegrator beam on St Clair, Professor Norton leads an expedition to investigate. Along with him in his Rocket Submarine are Crash, Diana, three sailors (Briny Deep, Salty, Joe) and their pet parrot Sinbad. Unknown to the expedition until it is underway and in trouble, Billy has stowed away on the Rocket Sub as well.

Problems for the expedition begin when Joe, in charge of the engine room, is driven mad by the fear that the submarine cannot survive such depths. In order to prove this, he locks the engine room door and sends the sub into a fatal dive. As soon as this crisis is averted, Unga Khan and Captain Hakur detect their approach and bring them through a tunnel into the Inland Sea with a Magnetic Ray.

== Cast ==
=== Main cast ===
- Ray "Crash" Corrigan as Crash Corrigan, Athlete and Navy Lieutenant. Crash Corrigan's stage name came from this serial.
- Lois Wilde as Diana Compton, Reporter from the Times who joins the expedition to Atlantis to get a story
- Monte Blue as Unga Khan, Tyrant and leader of the Black Robes
- William Farnum as Sharad, High priest of Atlantis and leader of the White Robes
- Boothe Howard as Ditmar, one of Unga Khan's Black Robes
- Raymond Hatton as Gasspom, one of Unga Khan's Black Robes
- C. Montague Shaw as Professor Norton, a British-born US scientist and leader of the expedition to Atlantis in his Rocket Submarine
- Lee Van Atta as Billy Norton, Professor Norton's young son who stows away aboard the submarine expedition
- Smiley Burnette as Briny Deep, a sailor in Professor Norton's Rocket Sub expedition and comic relief
- Frankie Marvin as Salty, a sailor in Professor Norton's Rocket Sub expedition and comic relief

=== Supporting cast ===
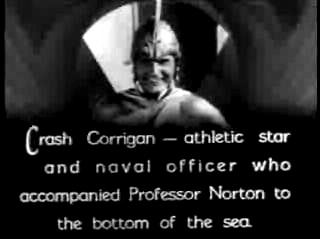
"Optical" foreword for Crash Corrigan, from the start of chapter two of Undersea Kingdom

- Lon Chaney Jr. as Captain Hakur, Black Robe commander, Unga Khan's main henchman. Captain Hakur was "probably" Lon Chaney Jr.'s "most colourful henchman."
- Lane Chandler as Darius, one of Sharad's White Robes
- Jack Mulhall as Lieutenant Andrews, US Navy
- John Bradford as Joe, a sailor in Professor Norton's Rocket Sub expedition who goes mad with fear and almost kills them all
- Malcolm McGregor as Zogg, one of Unga Khan's Black Robes
- Ralph Holmes as Martos, one of Sharad's White Robes
- John Merton as Moloch, Black Robe whose life is spared by Corrigan and switches sides
- Ernie Smith as Gourk, one of Unga Khan's Black Robes
- Lloyd Whitlock as Captain Clinton, US Navy Captain

== Production ==
Undersea Kingdom was budgeted at $81,924 although the final negative cost was $99,222 (a $17,298, or 21.1%, overspend). It has the lowest budget of any Republic serial but it was only the third cheapest in actual production cost. The serial was filmed between 3 March and 28 March 1936 under production number 417. The only cheaper serials were the subsequent The Vigilantes Are Coming ($87,655) and, in 1938, The Fighting Devil Dogs ($92,569). By comparison, the larger Universal Pictures spent $350,000 in producing the first Flash Gordon serial.

=== Stunts ===
- George DeNormand
- Tracy Layne
- Ted Mapes
- Eddie Parker
- Charles Schaeffer
- Tom Steele started his serial career in this serial. He went on to work in most of the subsequent serials produced by Republic and Universal Pictures.
- Bill Yrigoyen

=== Special effects ===
- John T. Coyle
- The Lydecker brothers
- Bud Thackery

These include the Volkites (The robotic army of the Black Robes), The Juggernaut (their tank), Vol Planes (Atlantean rocketships) and Professor Norton's Rocket Submarine, as well as sets and Unga Khan's tower.

This is the first appearance of the "Republic Robot" (as the "Volkites"). It would turn up again in Mysterious Doctor Satan (1940) and Zombies of the Stratosphere (1952). It is parodied in Star Trek: Voyager's The Adventures of Captain Proton.

Some of the model effects seen within the serial:

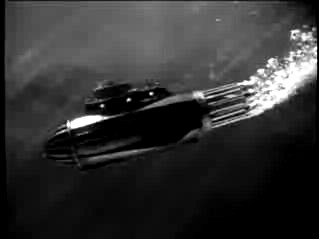
Professor Norton's Rocket Submarine

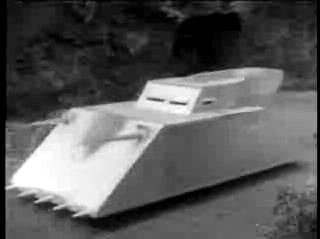
Unga Khan's Juggernaut tank

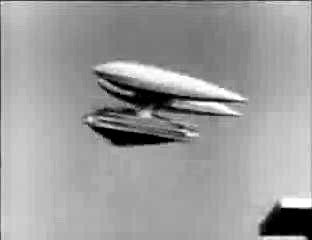
One of Unga Khan's Vol Planes

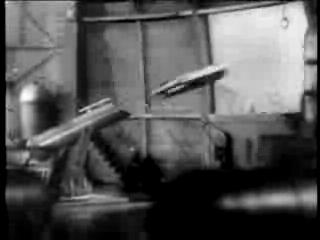
An aerial torpedo being fired from Unga Khan's tower

== Unga Khan's technology ==
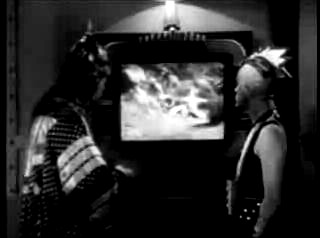
Unga Khan using his Reflector Plate

While the technology base of Atlantis is apparently very low, with sword-wielding cavalry and chariots the main type of military force, Unga Khan's Black Robes (or Imperial Guard) have several very advanced items of technology.

Unga Khan's Disintegrator is the main plot device. A machine capable of artificially creating earthquakes at a precise target, it is this that leads to Professor Norton's expedition to Atlantis and also the means by which Unga Khan means to conquer or destroy the upper world.

The Reflector Plate is the most ubiquitous device used throughout the serial. This is a screen that acts much like a view screen, or videophone, in more modern science fiction. It is used to communicate between two plates or it is used, most frequently, to view (and hear) any remote location. No cameras or microphones are apparently necessary to this second function and it appears to have no limits - viewing the Sacred City, areas of Atlantis and the upper world with no problems.

Unga Khan's Imperial Guard are augmented by Volkites, a type of robot controlled by a bulky remote control device often worn by Hakur. They also perform tasks in the tower, for example operating the Master Controls of other devices such as the Disintegrator when commanded to by remote control (the remote control of most devices is usually done through remotely controlling the Volkite(s) to operate the Master Controls to remotely control the actual device). While the Imperial Guard use swords or bows, the Volkites are armed with Atomguns, rifle-sized ray guns. Occasionally these are used by others where necessary but only when taken from a Volkite.

In terms of vehicles, Unga Khan has one tank, called the Juggernaut. This can be controlled by remote as well as by the driver (either human or Volkite). It has no armament itself but is used as a battering ram during siege warfare. Though not used very often, Unga Khan's forces also have several aircraft called Vol Planes (also known as Sky Chariots by the White Robes).

Unga Khan's tower is armed with one Projector which fires one Aerial Torpedo at a time. This is, again, controlled by remote control.

Unga Khan uses his Transformation Chamber to brainwash those unwilling to do his bidding. The effect wears off in time and can be reversed by the Chamber.

The Magnetic Ray is used only once to pull the Rocket Submarine into Atlantis (much like a tractor beam in Star Wars or Star Trek) in the first chapter. In the last chapter, an Invisible Wall of Atom Rays is activated to provide Unga Khan's tower with a force field to protect it from the United States Navy's bombardment. Finally, the tower itself has automatic sliding doors and elevators.

The most advanced technology seemingly available to the opposing White Robes of Sharad are catapults and flame throwers built into the walls of the Sacred City.

== Release ==
=== Theatrical ===
Undersea Kingdom's official release date is 30 May 1936, although this is actually the date the sixth chapter was made available to film exchanges. It was re-released on 15 February 1950 between the first runs of Radar Patrol vs. Spy King and The Invisible Monster.

=== Television ===
Undersea Kingdom was one of several Republic serials re-released as a film for television in 1966. It was renamed as Sharad of Atlantis. This version was cut down to 100 minutes in length.

== Critical reception ==
In the words of film historian William C. Cline, Undersea Kingdom was a "totally unbelievable – but visually enjoyable – twelve-chapter madhouse chase."

== Chapter titles ==
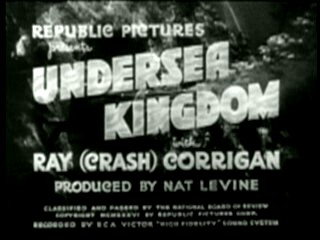
Title Screen of Undersea Kingdom (1936)

1. Beneath the Ocean Floor (30 min 51s)
2. The Undersea City (19 min 13s)
3. Arena of Death (18 min 58s)
4. Revenge of the Volkites (18 min 7s)
5. Prisoners of Atlantis (17 min 33s)
6. The Juggernaut Strikes (16 min 40s)
7. The Submarine Trap (17 min 20s)
8. Into the Metal Tower (16 min 49s)
9. Death in the Air (16 min 48s)
10. Atlantis Destroyed (17 min 28s)
11. Flaming Death (19 min 23s)
12. Ascent to the Upperworld (16 min 54s)

_{Source:}

== Cliffhangers ==
=== Cliffhangers ===
1. Beneath The Ocean Floor: Flying torpedoes cause a landslide and blow Crash and Billy off a cliff as they try to escape the Volkites.
2. The Undersea City: Crash is hit by an atom gun and falls down an elevator shaft.
3. Arena of Death: Crash is dragged behind a chariot.
4. Revenge of the Volkites: During a siege, Crash and Moloch fall into the path of a Black Robe cavalry charge.
5. Prisoners of Atlantis: Diana is trapped in the brainwashing Transformation Chamber.
6. The Juggernaut Strikes: As Crash (with Billy on his back) walks a tightrope across a chasm, Ditmar snaps the cable with torpedoes.
7. The Submarine Trap: Crash is caught an explosion when an arrow hits the cylinders of Priming Powder.
8. Into the Metal Tower: Crash is tied to the front of the Juggernaut (The Black Robe Tank) as it rams the gates of the sacred city.
9. Death in the Air: The heroes' aircraft is shot down by Unga Khan.
10. Atlantis Destroyed: The heroes are caught in the Sacred City under aerial bombardment.
11. Flaming Death: Crash and Professor Norton are caught in the jets of Unga Khan's rocket engines.

=== Solutions ===
Many of the solutions to these cliffhangers are "cheats"- they change or obviously do not match the events shown in the preceding cliffhanger.

1. The Undersea City: Crash and Billy take cover on the other side of the peak.
2. Arena of Death: Crash does not fall but catches the side of the shaft and climbs down.
3. Revenge of the Volkites: Crash climbs into the chariot and takes over.
4. Prisoners of Atlantis: Crash and Moloch lie flat and are unharmed as the charge passes around them.
5. The Juggernaut Strikes: Crash rescues Diana before the process is completed.
6. The Submarine Trap: Crash grabs hold of the cable before it snaps and they are able to drop safely to the ground.
7. Into the Metal Tower: Crash dives underwater moments before the explosion.
8. Death in the Air: Despite the visible effects of crashing into the gate in the previous chapter, this time the gates are opened before impact and the Juggernaut simply enters the courtyard.
9. Atlantis Destroyed: Crash, Billy and Professor Norton climb out of the wreckage without significant injury.
10. Flaming Death: Although Sharad is killed when a column falls on him, none of the heroes are seriously injured.
11. Ascent to the Upper World: Moloch is caught in the flames and dies, but Crash and Professor Norton escape to shelter in a lower level of the caves under Unga Khan's tower.

== See also ==
- List of film serials
- List of film serials by studio
- List of films in the public domain in the United States
