= Larry Grossman =

Larry or Lawrence Grossman may refer to:

- Larry Grossman (politician) (1943–1997), politician in Ontario, Canada
- Larry Grossman (composer) (born 1938), composer of Broadway musicals
- Lawrence Grossman (geochemist), see Meanings of minor planet names: 4001–5000
- Lawrence K. Grossman (1931-2018), American television executive
