= Mike Toth =

Canadian sportscaster

- Born: September 27, 1963 (age 63); Moose Jaw, Saskatchewan, Canada
- Employer: Newstalk 1010
- Known for: sports talk show host

Mike Toth (born September 27, 1963) is a Canadian sports anchor, formerly on Rogers Sportsnet's Sportsnet Connected and with the Fan 590 in Toronto. He grew up in Bassano, Alberta and then spent much of his early career in Calgary, Alberta with CICT-TV as a sports anchor and co-host of the station's "Sports @ 11" nightly sports broadcast. He then worked as a sports anchor for TSN's SportsCentre. After leaving TSN, Toth hosted the Hockey Central program, as well as guest hosted Prime Time Sports on The Fan 590. Toth was also a co-host on the Fan 590's "The Bullpen" with Mike Hogan from 10:00am to noon.

As of December 2009, Toth has joined Newstalk 1010 as their morning sports announcer.
