= C. Montague Shaw =

Australian character actor (1882–1968)

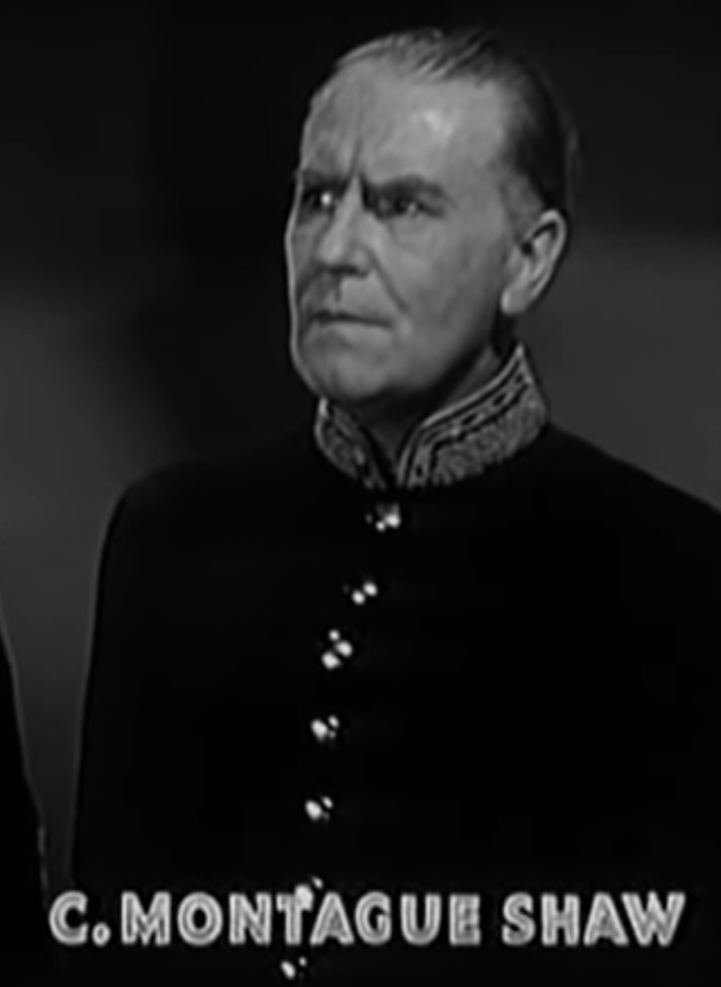
- Shaw in Zorro's Fighting Legion (1939)
- Born: Charles Montague Discombe Sparro; 23 March 1882; Adelaide, South Australia, Australia
- Died: 6 February 1968 (aged 85); Woodland Hills, Los Angeles, California, U.S.
- Resting place: Valhalla Memorial Park Cemetery
- Other name: Montague Shaw
- Occupation: Actor
- Years active: 1926–1949

Charles Montague Discombe Sparrow (23 March 1882 – 6 February 1968), known by his stage name C. Montague Shaw, was an Australian character actor, often appearing in small supporting parts in more than 150 films. Many of his roles were uncredited.

Shaw was born in Adelaide, South Australia, Australia.

He began his acting career in the Australian theatre, before moving on to Britain and elsewhere in the British Empire. His first film role was in The Set-Up (1926). He later found success in the film serial market, often playing professors and paternal supporting roles. His most known role came in 1936 as Professor Norton in the popular serial Undersea Kingdom, starring Crash Corrigan.

His final film role was in 1949.

Shaw died in Woodland Hills, Los Angeles, California, at the age of 85. He was buried in Valhalla Memorial Park Cemetery.

== Selected filmography ==
- With Edged Tools (1919) - Jack Meredith
- The Set-Up (1926) - Cliff Barton
- The Water Hole (1928) - Mr. Endicott
- Morgan's Last Raid (1929) - Gen. Rogers
- Square Shoulders (1929) - B.T. Cartwright
- The Silent Witness (1932) - Inspector Robbins
- Devil's Lottery (1932) - Assistant Inspector (uncredited)
- Letty Lynton (1932) - Ship's Officer at Christmas Party (uncredited)
- The Man Called Back (1932) - Scotland Yard Official (uncredited)
- Blondie of the Follies (1932) - Specialist (uncredited)
- Pack Up Your Troubles (1932) - Wrong Eddie's Father
- The Mask of Fu Manchu (1932) - Curator Dr. Fairgyle - British Museum Official (uncredited)
- Sherlock Holmes (1932) - Judge
- Payment Deferred (1932) - Mr. Edwards (uncredited)
- Silver Dollar (1932) - Washington Party Guest (uncredited)
- The Mummy (1932) - Gentleman #1 at Cairo Party (uncredited)
- Rasputin and the Empress (1932) - Minor Role (uncredited)
- Cynara (1932) - Constable (uncredited)
- Cavalcade (1933) - Major Domo (uncredited)
- Today We Live (1933) - Ambulance Corps Commanding Officer (uncredited)
- Gabriel Over the White House (1933) - British Delegate to Debt Conference (uncredited)
- The Big Brain (1933) - Minor Role (uncredited)
- The Masquerader (1933) - Speaker of the House (uncredited)
- Brief Moment (1933) - Lytton (uncredited)
- Fog (1933) - Ship Officer (uncredited)
- Dancing Lady (1933) - First Nighter (uncredited)
- Queen Christina (1933) - King Gustavus Adolphus (uncredited)
- Cross Country Cruise (1934) - Mr. Collins (uncredited)
- Beloved (1934) - Alexander Talbot
- Bedside (1934) - Dr. Moeller - at Opera (uncredited)
- The Mystery of Mr. X (1934) - Doctor (uncredited)
- Journal of a Crime (1934) - Ambassador at Dinner Party (uncredited)
- The House of Rothschild (1934) - Stock Trader
- Riptide (1934) - Tring (uncredited)
- Uncertain Lady (1934) - Mr. Weston (uncredited)
- Glamour (1934) - Throat Doctor (uncredited)
- Sisters Under the Skin (1934) - Brown
- All Men Are Enemies (1934) - Major (uncredited)
- Shock (1934) - Major (uncredited)
- The Girl from Missouri (1934) - Speaker at Banquet (uncredited)
- One More River (1934) - Guest (uncredited)
- Charlie Chan in London (1934) - Doctor (uncredited)
- Love Time (1934) - Major Domo (uncredited)
- Jealousy (1934) - Judge (uncredited)
- The Man Who Reclaimed His Head (1934) - A Dignitary (uncredited)
- The Winning Ticket (1935) - President of Insurance Company (uncredited)
- Carnival (1935) - Baby Judge (uncredited)
- Vanessa: Her Love Story (1935) - Dr. Lancaster (uncredited)
- Les Misérables (1935) - Factory Foreman (uncredited)
- Vagabond Lady (1935) - Hotel Manager (uncredited)
- Becky Sharp (1935) - British Nobleman (uncredited)
- Atlantic Adventure (1935) - Ship Captain (uncredited)
- Diamond Jim (1935) - Stockbroker (uncredited)
- The Dark Angel (1935) - Passenger on Train (uncredited)
- Two Sinners (1935) - Mr. Gryllis
- Streamline Express (1935) - Physician (uncredited)
- A Feather in Her Hat (1935) - Man (uncredited)
- Kind Lady (1935) - Passport Clerk (uncredited)
- A Tale of Two Cities (1935) - Chief Registrar (uncredited)
- Sylvia Scarlett (1935) - Minor Role (uncredited)
- Professional Soldier (1935) - Minister (uncredited)
- Two in the Dark (1936) - Richard Denning (uncredited)
- The Leathernecks Have Landed (1936) - Doctor (uncredited)
- The Story of Louis Pasteur (1936) - British Reporter (uncredited)
- Little Lord Fauntleroy (1936) - Mr. Semple (uncredited)
- The Unguarded Hour (1936) - Registrate (uncredited)
- Champagne Charlie (1936) - Board Member (uncredited)
- The King Steps Out (1936) - Russian Delegate (uncredited)
- Undersea Kingdom (1936, Serial) - Norton
- The White Angel (1936) - Old Officer (uncredited)
- My American Wife (1936) - Butler
- 15 Maiden Lane (1936) - Jim - a Guest (uncredited)
- Ace Drummond (1936, Serial) - Dr. Trainor
- Love on the Run (1936) - Hotel Manager (uncredited)
- Riders of the Whistling Skull (1937) - Professor Flaxon
- When You're in Love (1937) - Attorney (uncredited)
- Parole Racket (1937) - Judge Grayson
- The Frame-Up (1937) - James (J.R.) Weston
- The Devil Is Driving (1937) - First Judge (uncredited)
- It's All Yours (1937) - Pendleton (uncredited)
- The Sheik Steps Out (1937) - Dr. Peabody - Minister
- Radio Patrol (1937, Serial) - Mr. Wellington
- Nation Aflame (1937) - President of the United States
- No Time to Marry (1938) - Mr. Winthrop
- Start Cheering (1938) - Dr. Atwell - Board Member (uncredited)
- When G-Men Step In (1938) - Professor Atterbury (uncredited)
- Flash Gordon's Trip to Mars (1938, Serial) - Clay King
- Four Men and a Prayer (1938) - Barrister (scenes deleted)
- Extortion (1938) - Dean Latham (uncredited)
- Kidnapped (1938) - Scotch Statesman
- Lord Jeff (1938) - Magistrate (uncredited)
- Little Miss Broadway (1938) - Miles
- Gateway (1938) - Captain
- Smashing the Rackets (1938) - Grand Juryman (uncredited)
- Suez (1938) - Elderly Man
- Mr. Moto's Last Warning (1939) - Adm. Lord Streetly (uncredited)
- Risky Business (1939) - Second Executive (uncredited)
- The Three Musketeers (1939) - Ship Captain
- Buck Rogers (1939, Serial) - Professor Huer
- The Sun Never Sets (1939) - Colonial Affairs Official (uncredited)
- Daredevils of the Red Circle (1939, Serial) - Dr. Malcolm
- Stanley and Livingstone (1939) - Sir Oliver French
- The Rains Came (1939) - General Keith
- Rio (1939) - Aristocratic Man (uncredited)
- Scandal Sheet (1939) - Dean Crosby
- Tower of London (1939) - Majordomo (uncredited)
- Zorro's Fighting Legion (1939) - Pablo
- Charlie Chan's Murder Cruise (1940) - Inspector Duff
- The Gay Caballero (1940) - George Wetherby
- The Mysterious Dr. Satan (1940) - Prof. Thomas Scott
- The Green Hornet Strikes Again! (1940, Serial) - Weaver - Gang Chemist
- Puddin' Head (1941) - Judge (uncredited)
- Charley's Aunt (1941) - Elderly Professor
- Burma Convoy (1941) - Major Hart
- Hard Guy (1941) - Anthony Tremaine, Sr.
- Holt of the Secret Service (1941, Serial) - Chief John W. Malloy
- Dick Tracy vs. Crime, Inc. (1941, Serial) - Dr. Jonathan Morton (uncredited)
- Bombay Clipper (1942) - Captain Caldwell (uncredited)
- Law of the Jungle (1942) - Sgt. Burke
- The Dawn Express (1942) - Franklin Prescott (uncredited)
- Perils of the Royal Mounted (1942, Serial) - Commissioner Phillips [Chs.13,15]
- The Pride of the Yankees (1942) - Mr. Worthington (uncredited)
- Thunder Birds (1942) - Doctor
- The Black Swan (1942) - Assemblyman (uncredited)
- Random Harvest (1942) - Julia's Husband (uncredited)
- G-Men vs. the Black Dragon (1943) - Prof. Nicholson [Ch. 3-4]
- Appointment in Berlin (1943) - Langly (uncredited)
- Isle of Forgotten Sins (1943) - The Commissioner (uncredited)
- The Lodger (1944) - Stage Manager (uncredited)
- Wilson (1944) - Harry L. White (uncredited)
- Faces in the Fog (1944) - Judge (uncredited)
- Tonight and Every Night (1945) - Old Bobby (uncredited)
- Confidential Agent (1945) - Customs Officer (uncredited)
- An Angel Comes to Brooklyn (1945) - Sir Henry Bushnell
- The Verdict (1946) - Businessman (uncredited)
- Monsieur Verdoux (1947) - Mortgage Banker (uncredited)
- The Private Affairs of Bel Ami (1947) - Surgeon
- The Imperfect Lady (1947) - Minor Role (uncredited)
- Ivy (1947) - Stevens (uncredited)
- Thunder in the Valley (1947) - Judge (uncredited)
- Unconquered (1947) - Judge's Aide (uncredited)
- Road to the Big House (1947) - Judge
- The Pilgrimage Play (1949) - Caiaphas (final film role)
