= Wally Crouter =

Canadian radio broadcaster (1923–2016)

- Born: Wallace Clarence Crouter; August 5, 1923; Lindsay, Ontario, Canada
- Died: March 28, 2016 (aged 92); Toronto, Ontario, Canada
- Resting place: Mount Pleasant Cemetery, Toronto
- Occupation: Radio broadcaster
- Spouse(s): Kathleen Fox (m. ~1945, div.), Lynne Ryder (m. 1983)
- Children: 3

Wallace Clarence "Wally" Crouter (August 5, 1923 – March 28, 2016) was a Canadian radio broadcaster best known for his career at CFRB radio in Toronto, spanning exactly half a century, most of which was spent as the station's top-rated morning man.

== Early years ==
Crouter was born and raised in Lindsay, Ontario and made his debut radio broadcast on Toronto radio station CKGW in 1932 as a nine-year-old, award-winning 'boy soprano'.

Crouter served in the Canadian Army in World War II. He was injured by shrapnel in Italy and recuperated in hospital for a year after which he joined the entertainment unit as a singer touring with the Army Show performing at bases in Britain, Rome, Paris and North Africa. While with the entertainment unit, he met and fell in love with fellow entertainer Kathleen Fox, whom he married after the war.

== Radio career ==
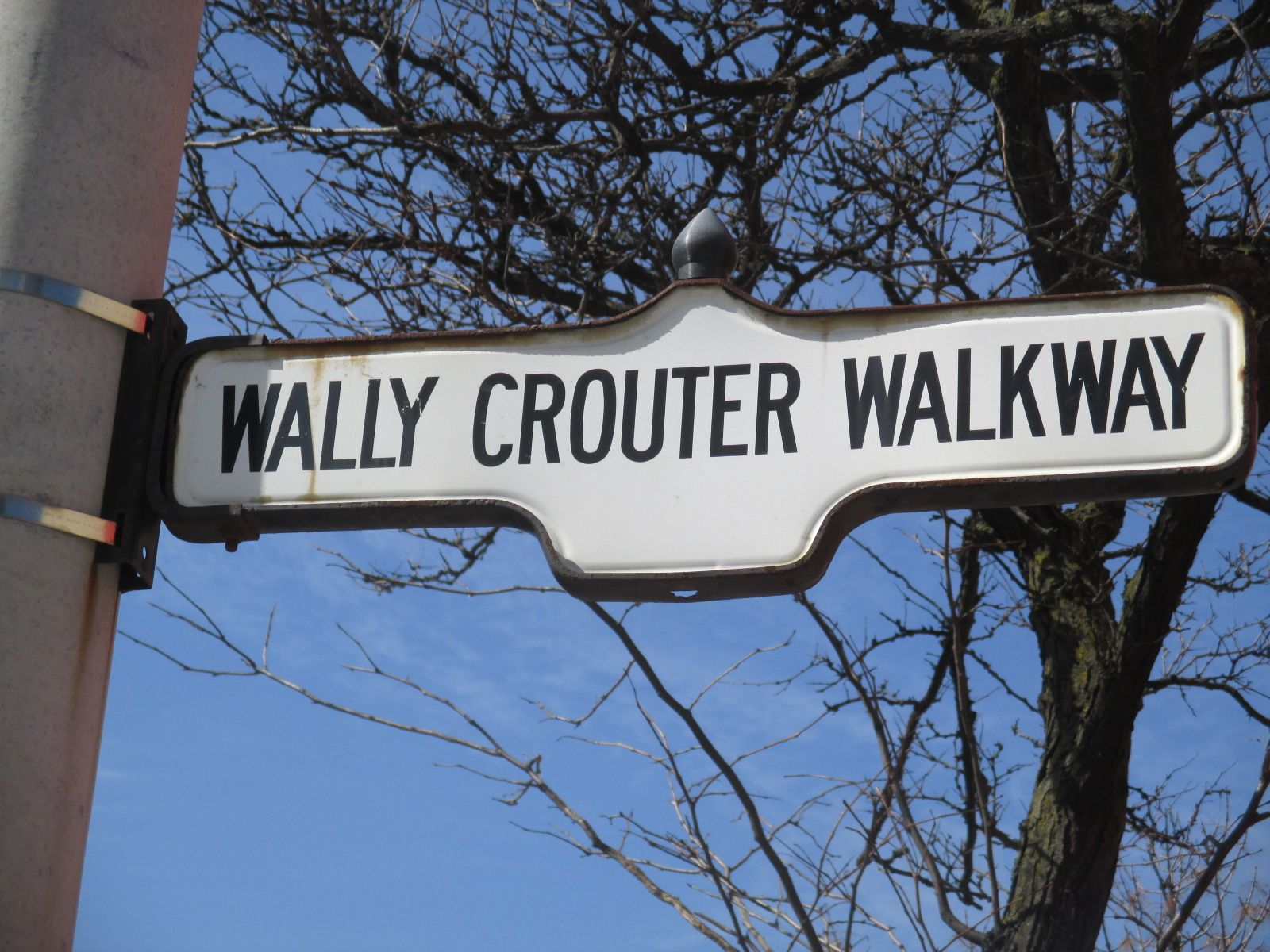
Sign for walkway in tribute to Wally Crouter

After the war Crouter joined CFRB on November 1, 1946 as host of the morning show after a brief stint hosting The Home Folks Hour at radio station CHEX in Peterborough, Ontario, near his hometown.

At the height of his influence in the 1970s and 80s, Mr. Crouter had the highest-rated show in the city and his name was known across the country. According to his son Glenn, the key to his father's success was to avoid any topic that could potentially divide an audience like sex, politics or religion - both on and off the air. About the reason for his own success, Wally Crouter said, "I always tried to put myself in the place of the listener. … It's the most personal time of the day. The radio is on while you're doing your morning ablutions, getting dressed, having breakfast with the kids coming to the table. … I've had a surgeon write me to tell me that, when he had three serious operations to do in a day, he started off by listening to my show so he could achieve the right relaxation and focus he needed."

On November 1, 1996, exactly 50 years to the day of his start with CFRB, Crouter, who would be known as Canada's longest serving radio morning man, retired. He was subsequently inducted into the Canadian Broadcast Hall of Fame. Wally Crouter Walkway, located off Yonge Street north of St. Clair Avenue behind the former offices of CFRB, was named after the broadcaster.

== Death ==
Crouter died in his sleep on March 28, 2016 at Sunnybrook Hospital in Toronto.

He is survived by sons Dale and Glenn, who was also a broadcaster, his wife Lynne, daughter Janice, and 5 grandchildren.

== Quotations ==
- "Before you put your foot down, make sure you've got a leg to stand on." -A Thought of the Day from a Wally Crouter broadcast.
