= Robert Wilcox (actor) =

American actor (1910–1955)

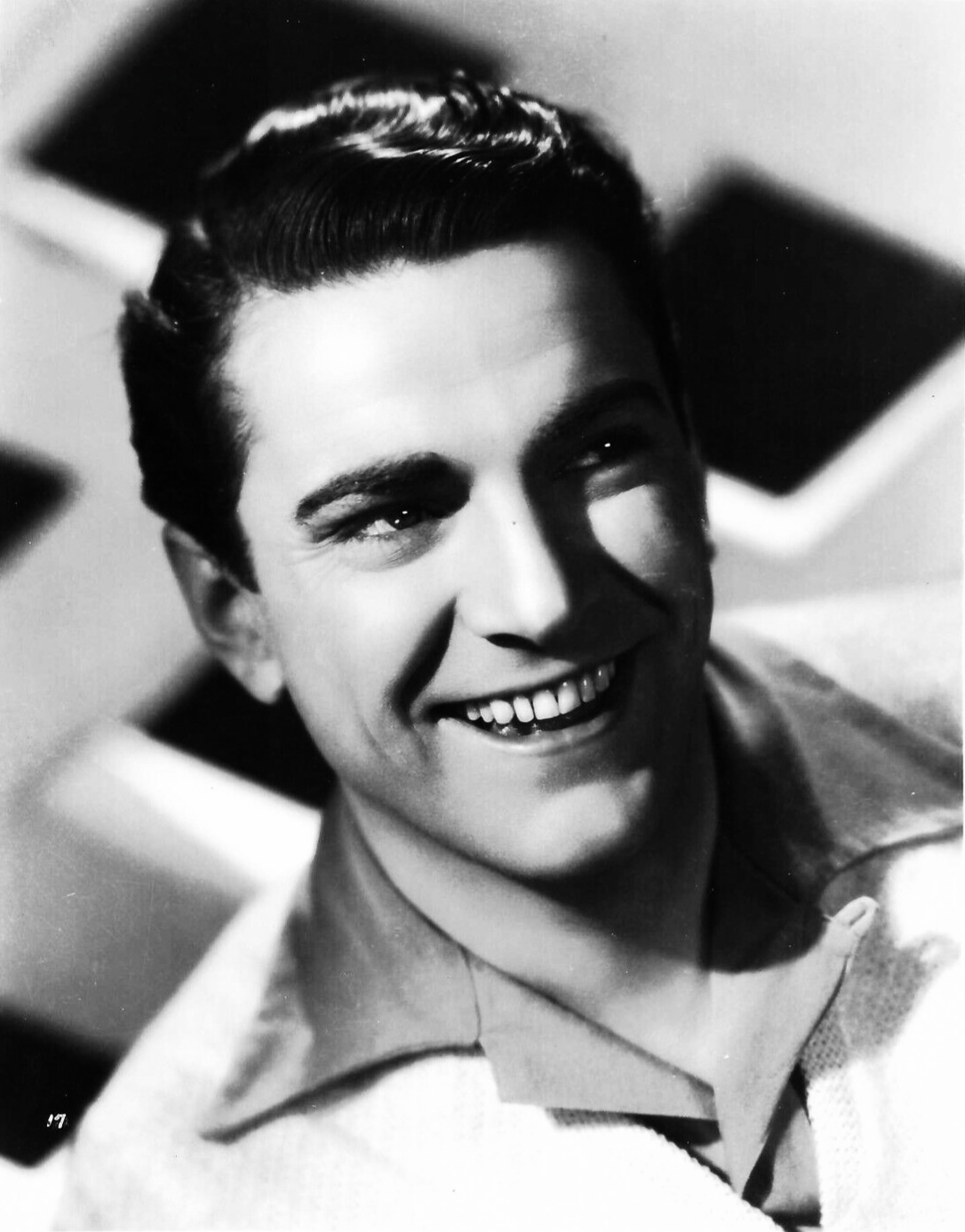
- Wilcox in 1937
- Born: May 10, 1910; Rochester, New York, U.S.
- Died: June 11, 1955 (aged 45); New York City, U.S.
- Resting place: Riverside Cemetery, Rochester
- Occupation: Actor
- Years active: 1936–1954
- Spouses: Florence Rice (m. 1939; div. 1940) Diana Barrymore (m. 1950)

Robert Wilcox (May 19, 1910 – June 11, 1955) was an American film and theater actor of the 1930s, 1940s, and 1950s.

== Personal life ==
Wilcox was born on May 19, 1910, in Rochester, New York, the son of Roscoe Squires Wilcox of Rochester, who died when Wilcox was 16. He attended Nazareth Hall Academy and John Marshall High School in Rochester. He graduated from Peddie Preparatory School in Highland, New Jersey; the University of Southern California (USC); and the Passadena Community Playhouse. At USC he was a member of Chi Phi fraternity and other organizations.

Before Wilcox became an actor he worked at a variety of jobs for two years. They included selling furniture, selling candy, working on a construction crew at Boulder Dam, helping a pastor of a metaphysical church, and being a bodyguard for a politician in Los Angeles.

He was married twice. His first wife was Florence Rice, daughter of sportswriter Grantland Rice. They were married on March 31, 1939, and were divorced on July 31, 1940. He married Diana Barrymore in 1950. The five-year marriage, which ended with his death, was stormy, with repeated separations, reconciliations and police calls for domestic disturbances. Barrymore chronicled their bouts with alcoholism in her 1957 autobiography—later a film—Too Much, Too Soon.

== Acting career ==
He started his career with a Buffalo, New York, Community Theater Group. His career began in earnest in 1936 after being signed by a Universal Pictures talent scout while playing Duke Mantee in a summer-stock production of The Petrified Forest. Wilcox worked in 18 Hollywood films before World War II, starting with the role of the Intern in Let Them Live. (Another source states that he played the romantic lead in 26 films, before going into the service for World War II.) He was a contract player with Universal Studios, unhappy with his typecasting in "cops and robbers" roles. He is perhaps best known for playing Bob Wayne and his alter ego, "The Copperhead", in the 1940 film serial Mysterious Doctor Satan.

He was inducted into the United States Army February 27, 1942. He served 38 months in the United States Army during World War II, rising from private to the rank of captain, and seeing action in Belgium, France and Germany. Following the war, he returned to Rochester, and appeared in an amateur production of Soldier's Wife, a quiet comedy by Rose Franken about a veteran returning from the Pacific, presented in January 1946 by the Rochester Community Players. Wilcox, according to a contemporary news report, was considering whether to go back to Hollywood or to work in professional theater. his post-war work was mostly on the stage.

His last stage performance was in the road show Pajama Top, costarring his wife, Diana Barrymore. The production, an English translation of the French comic success, Moumou, was directed by Leonard Altobell (also a native of Rochester) and opened its national tour at the Auditorium Theater in Rochester November 8, 1954.

== Death ==
Wilcox died of a heart attack on June 11, 1955, while riding a train from New York City to Rochester to visit his mother. A porter discovered his body in a Pullman berth when he tried to wake the actor at the Rochester train station stop. He was 45 years old. He is buried at Riverside Cemetery.
