= Alan Bridge =

American actor (1891–1957)

Al Bridge
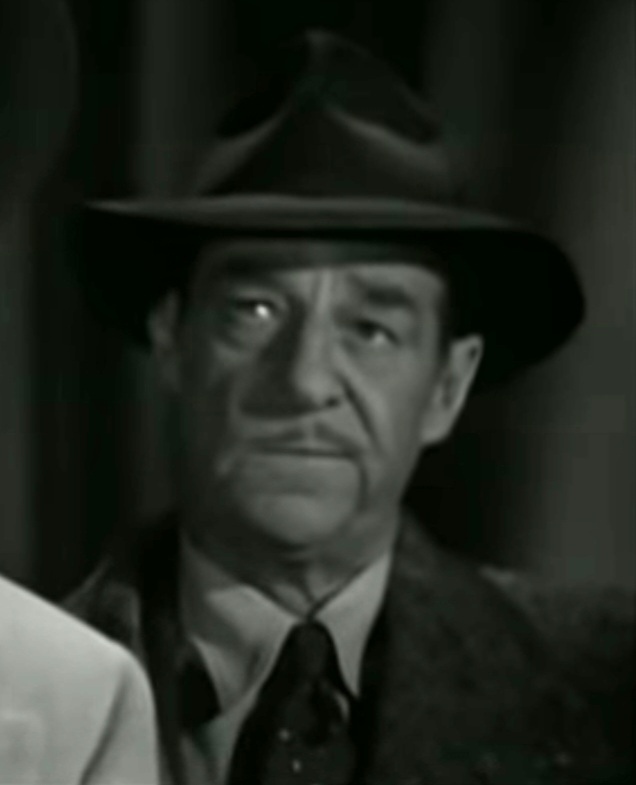
- Bridge in Dick Tracy's Dilemma (1947)
- Born: Alfred Morton Bridge; February 26, 1891; Pennsylvania, U.S.
- Died: December 27, 1957 (aged 66); Los Angeles, California, U.S.
- Resting place: Valhalla Memorial Park Cemetery
- Occupation: Actor
- Years active: 1905–1954
- Spouse: Blanche Valarie Soules (married 1935-1945)

Alfred Morton Bridge (February 26, 1891 – December 27, 1957 ) was an American character actor who played mostly small roles in over 270 films between 1931 and 1954. Bridge's persona was an unpleasant, gravel-voiced man with an untidy moustache. Sometimes credited as Alan Bridge, and frequently not credited onscreen at all, he appeared in many Westerns, especially in the Hopalong Cassidy series, where he played crooked sheriffs and henchmen.

== Life and career ==
Born in Pennsylvania and raised in Philadelphia, Bridge and his sister, who became actress Loie Bridge, grew up with their mother and stepfather, a local butcher. Having entered into vaudeville alongside his sister while still a teenager, Bridge served in the American infantry during World War I. Picking up where they left off shortly thereafter, they toured the U.S. as a team until 1924. Among those who appeared alongside the Bridges during those years were future film players such as Emmett Lynn, Harry Cheshire, Chill Wills, and Joan Crawford.

In 1930, Bridge broke into movies by co-scripting the comedy short Her Hired Husband. The following year he co-wrote and costarred in the Western, God's Country and the Man (aka A Man's Country and Rose of the Rio Grande).

Bridge spent the next 25 years as a familiar face in B-Westerns and mainstream comedies and dramas. In the forties, Bridge was part of Preston Sturges' unofficial "stock company" of character actors, appearing in ten of the eleven American films that Sturges wrote and directed. He is perhaps best remembered for his role as "The Mister", the chain-gang boss over Joel McCrea in Preston Sturges' Sullivan's Travels. Bridge played against type as a kindly lawyer in Sturges' The Miracle of Morgan's Creek. In It's a Wonderful Life, he appears uncredited towards the end of the film as the sheriff who wants to arrest George Bailey, but eventually tears up the arrest warrant.

Bridge's television work, which began in 1950 includes appearances on The Range Rider and The Gene Autry Show as well as other programs.

== Personal life and death ==
Bridge married Blanche Valarie Soules on December 24, 1935 at the United Christian Church of America in Los Angeles, California. She died on April 19, 1945.

Bridge died in Los Angeles at the age 66. His remains are interred at Valhalla Memorial Park Cemetery in North Hollywood.

== Selected filmography ==
- God's Country and the Man (1931) - Livermore
- Rider of the Plains (1931) - Deputy Bill Gaines
- The Ridin' Fool (1931) - Nikkos
- Partners of the Trail (1931) - Henchman (uncredited)
- Galloping Thru (1931) - Sandy Thompson
- South of Santa Fe (1932) - Henchman Bully
- Police Court (1932)
- The Forty-Niners (1932) - Squaw O'Hara
- Spirit of the West (1932) - Tom Fallon
- Unholy Love (1932) - Police Sergeant (uncredited)
- A Man's Land (1932) - Steve - Rustler
- Million Dollar Legs (1932) - Secret Emissary #3 (uncredited)
- The Hurricane Express (1932, Serial) - Carlson
- The Thirteenth Guest (1932) - Policeman (uncredited)
- Broadway to Cheyenne (1932) - Al
- Blonde Venus (1932) - Bouncer (uncredited)
- Cowboy Counsellor (1932) - Sheriff Matt Farraday
- Slightly Married (1932) - Tenant (uncredited)
- The Devil Horse (1932) - Curley Bates - Henchman
- The Wyoming Whirlwind (1932) - Steve Cantrell
- When a Man Rides Alone (1933) - Montana Slade
- The Cheyenne Kid (1933) - Denver Ed
- Drum Taps (1933) - Lariat Smith
- The Thundering Herd (1933) - Catlee - Pruitt's Henchman
- Sucker Money (1933) - George Hunter
- Black Beauty (1933) - Hack Driver
- Son of the Border (1933) - Tupper
- The Lone Avenger (1933) - Burl Adams
- Sunset Pass (1933) - Tom
- Fighting Texans (1933) - Gus Durkin
- Fighting with Kit Carson (1933, Serial) - Henchman Reynolds [Chs. 1–7, 10, 12]
- The Trail Drive (1933) - Henchman Bucko (uncredited)
- Murder on the Campus (1933) - Grimes, City Editor (uncredited)
- Twin Husbands (1933) - Highway Patrolman (uncredited)
- Public Stenographer (1934) - Detective Scott (uncredited)
- Good Dame (1934) - Patrol Car Cop (uncredited)
- Looking for Trouble (1934) - Lineman (uncredited)
- The Trumpet Blows (1934) - Policeman (uncredited)
- Honor of the Range (1934) - Townsman (uncredited)
- We're Not Dressing (1934) - Ship's Officer - Rescue Party (uncredited)
- Burn 'Em Up Barnes (1934, Serial) - Henchman Tucker [Chs. 3-12] (uncredited)
- The Curtain Falls (1934) - Mover (uncredited)
- Mystery Mountain (1934) - Tom Henderson
- North of Arizona (1935) - George Tully
- Outlaw Rule (1935) - Deputy Bat Lindstrom
- Transient Lady (1935) - Sheriff Angel Verner
- Circumstantial Evidence (1935) - John Cassidy (uncredited)
- Alias Mary Dow (1935) - Ditch-Digger (uncredited)
- Silent Valley (1935) - Jim Farley
- The Headline Woman (1935) - Baker, Editor (uncredited)
- The Murder Man (1935) - Judge John C. Garfield (uncredited)
- The Adventures of Rex and Rinty (1935, Serial) - Henchman Mitchell [Chs. 1–6, 10]
- Diamond Jim (1935) - Poker Player on Train (uncredited)
- The Gay Deception (1935) - Jail Attendant (uncredited)
- Confidential (1935) - Hanover - Walsh's Henchman
- Valley of Wanted Men (1935) - Ranger Sergeant Parsons
- Melody Trail (1935) - Matt Kirby
- Rendezvous (1935) - Sergeant (uncredited)
- The New Frontier (1935) - Kit
- A Night at the Opera (1935) - Immigration Inspector (uncredited)
- Gallant Defender (1935) - Salty Smith
- The Adventures of Frank Merriwell (1936, Serial) - Henchman Black
- The Bridge of Sighs (1936) - Ballistics Expert (uncredited)
- The Lawless Nineties (1936) - Steele
- Fast Bullets (1936) - Travis
- The Music Goes 'Round (1936) - Police Inspector (uncredited)
- Call of the Prairie (1936) - Sam Porter
- These Three (1936) - Mrs. Walton's Chauffeur (uncredited)
- And So They Were Married (1936) - Motorcycle Cop (uncredited)
- Public Enemy's Wife (1936) - Swartzman
- Mary of Scotland (1936) - (uncredited)
- Crash Donovan (1936) - Desk Sergeant (uncredited)
- They Met in a Taxi (1936) - Detective (uncredited)
- The Three Mesquiteers (1936) - Olin Canfield
- Ace Drummond (1936, Serial) - Paul Wyckoff
- Trail Dust (1936) - Tom Babson
- Dodge City Trail (1936) - Dawson
- Jungle Jim (1937, Serial) - Slade
- Westbound Mail (1937) - 'Bull' Feeney
- You Only Live Once (1937) - Guard (uncredited)
- Borderland (1937) - Dandy Morgan - Henchman
- Song of the City (1937) - Captain (uncredited)
- Two Gun Law (1937) - Kipp Faulkner
- Woman Chases Man (1937) - Process Server (uncredited)
- Married Before Breakfast (1937) - Police Driver (uncredited)
- One Man Justice (1937) - Red Grindy
- Wild West Days (1937) - Steve Claggett
- They Won't Forget (1937) - Mob Leader Outside Governor's Mansion (uncredited)
- Dead End (1937) - Policeman in Drina's Apartment (uncredited)
- Western Gold (1937) - Holman
- The Awful Truth (1937) - Motor Cop (uncredited)
- Springtime in the Rockies (1937) - Briggs
- Tim Tyler's Luck (1937, Serial) - Capt. Trowbridge [Ch. 1] (uncredited)
- Partners of the Plains (1938) - Scar Lewis
- Little Miss Roughneck (1938) - Sheriff
- Born to Be Wild (1938) - Kennedy - Trucker in Cafe (uncredited)
- Jezebel (1938) - New Orleans Sheriff (uncredited)
- Two Gun Justice (1938) - Sheriff
- Crime School (1938) - Mr. Burke
- Gunsmoke Trail (1938) - Sheriff chasing Loma
- Reformatory (1938) - Guard (uncredited)
- Highway Patrol (1938) - Jarvis
- The Great Adventures of Wild Bill Hickok (1938) - Blackie (uncredited)
- Flaming Frontiers (1938, Serial) - John Merkle [Chs. 6-7] (uncredited)
- Marie Antoinette (1938) - Official in Passport Office (uncredited)
- The Colorado Trail (1938) - Mark Sheldon
- Down in 'Arkansaw' (1938) - Jake
- Adventure in Sahara (1938) - Cpl. Dronov
- Call of the Rockies (1938) - Weston
- The Phantom Creeps (1939) - White Rose Sailor (uncredited)
- Devil's Island (1939) - Captain of the Guards (uncredited)
- Frontiers of '49 (1939) - Army Sergeant (uncredited)
- Risky Business (1939) - Cop (uncredited)
- The Oklahoma Kid (1939) - Would-Be Settler (uncredited)
- Romance of the Redwoods (1939) - Boss Whittaker
- Buck Rogers (1939, Serial) - Dynamo Room Floor Guard (uncredited)
- Blue Montana Skies (1939) - Marshal
- The Man from Sundown (1939) - Slick Larson
- Thunder Afloat (1939) - Fisherman (uncredited)
- No Place to Go (1939) - Frank Crowley
- Oklahoma Frontier (1939) - Kentuck (uncredited)
- Mr. Smith Goes to Washington (1939) - Senator Dwight (uncredited)
- The Roaring Twenties (1939) - Ship Captain (uncredited)
- The Stranger from Texas (1939) - Jeff Browning
- My Son Is Guilty (1939) - Police Lieutenant at Holdup (uncredited)
- West of Carson City (1940) - Foreman of the Jury (uncredited)
- My Little Chickadee (1940) - Barfly Drinking Straight Whiskey (uncredited)
- Pioneers of the Frontier (1940) - Marshal Larsen
- The Courageous Dr. Christian (1940) - Sheriff
- Blazing Six Shooters (1940) - Bert Karsin
- Dark Command (1940) - Slave Trader (uncredited)
- If I Had My Way (1940) - Doorman (uncredited)
- Passport to Alcatraz (1940) - James Carver (uncredited)
- Winners of the West (1940, Serial) - Captain [Ch. 13] (uncredited)
- When the Daltons Rode (1940) - Townsman (uncredited)
- Flowing Gold (1940) - Highway Patrolman (uncredited)
- Diamond Frontier (1940) - Guard (uncredited)
- Barnyard Follies (1940) - Policeman (uncredited)
- Christmas in July (1940) - Mr. Hillbeiner
- Santa Fe Trail (1940) - Palmyra Townsman (uncredited)
- The Green Hornet Strikes Again! (1940, Serial) - Ship's Captain (uncredited)
- The Lone Rider Rides On (1941) - Bob Cameron
- The Face Behind the Mask (1941) - Flop House Manager (uncredited)
- The Kid's Last Ride (1941) - Bob Harmon, aka Jim Breeden
- The Lady Eve (1941) - First Steward (uncredited)
- Double Date (1941) - Sergeant O'Rourke (uncredited)
- The Lady from Cheyenne (1941) - Mr. Matthews
- The Lone Rider Rides On (1941) - Bob Cameron
- Road to Zanzibar (1941) - Colonial Policeman with Inspector (uncredited)
- Lady from Louisiana (1941) - Captain of Police (uncredited)
- The Big Boss (1941) - Minor Role (uncredited)
- Country Fair (1941) - (uncredited)
- Law of the Range (1941) - Jamison
- Rawhide Rangers (1941) - Rawlings
- Wild Geese Calling (1941) - Minor Role (uncredited)
- The Little Foxes (1941) - Dawson (uncredited)
- Badlands of Dakota (1941) - Plainview Lawman (uncredited)
- Honky Tonk (1941) - Townsman at Meeting House (uncredited)
- Tuxedo Junction (1941) - Chief Conway (uncredited)
- Sullivan's Travels (1941) - The Mister
- Fighting Bill Fargo (1941) - Tom Houston
- Honolulu Lu (1941) - Shooting Gallery Proprietor (uncredited)
- Road Agent (1941) - Rancher (uncredited)
- Sealed Lips (1942) - Newspaper Morgue Attendant (uncredited)
- West of Tombstone (1942) - U. S. Marshal (uncredited)
- Pardon My Stripes (1942) - Guard (uncredited)
- Wild Bill Hickok Rides (1942) - Man (uncredited)
- The Man Who Returned to Life (1942) - Hobo (uncredited)
- The Mad Doctor of Market Street (1942) - Ship's Officer on Bridge (uncredited)
- Reap the Wild Wind (1942) - Cutler Man in Barrel Room (uncredited)
- The Affairs of Jimmy Valentine (1942) - Trustee
- Saboteur (1942) - Marine MP Sergeant (uncredited)
- In This Our Life (1942) - Worker (uncredited)
- Meet the Stewarts (1942) - Police Turnkey (uncredited)
- Juke Girl (1942) - Farmer Hiring Bean Pickers (uncredited)
- Lady in a Jam (1942) - Furniture Mover (uncredited)
- Men of Texas (1942) - Goodrich (uncredited)
- Bad Men of the Hills (1942) - Sheriff Mace Arnold
- The Talk of the Town (1942) - Desk Sergeant (uncredited)
- The Palm Beach Story (1942) - Conductor
- Bells of Capistrano (1942) - Westfall Saloon Bartender (uncredited)
- A Man's World (1942) - Capt. Peterson (uncredited)
- I Married a Witch (1942) - Second Prison Guard (uncredited)
- The Traitor Within (1942) - Henchman (uncredited)
- Tenting Tonight on the Old Camp Ground (1943) - Matt Warner
- Idaho (1943) - Jailer (uncredited)
- The Man from Thunder River (1943) - Prospector (uncredited)
- Petticoat Larceny (1943) - Jack Goss (uncredited)
- Nobody's Darling (1943) - Bum (uncredited)
- The Miracle of Morgan's Creek (1943) - Mr. Johnson
- And the Angels Sing (1944) - Squad Car Policeman (uncredited)
- The Great Moment (1944) - Mr. Stone (uncredited)
- Hail the Conquering Hero (1944) - Political Boss
- Cry of the Werewolf (1944) - Coroner at Inquest (uncredited)
- The Merry Monahans (1944) - Man on Train (uncredited)
- The Unwritten Code (1944) - Sheriff (uncredited)
- The Missing Juror (1944) - Deputy Sheriff Ben (uncredited)
- The Princess and the Pirate (1944) - Pirate (uncredited)
- The Jade Mask (1945) - Sheriff Mack
- A Tree Grows in Brooklyn (1945) - Cheap Charlie (uncredited)
- A Guy, a Gal and a Pal (1945) - Mayor (uncredited)
- Thunderhead, Son of Flicka (1945) - Dr. Hicks (uncredited)
- Salty O'Rourke (1945) - Bartender (uncredited)
- The Clock (1945) - Second Subway Official (uncredited)
- Escape in the Desert (1945) - Citizen Gunman (uncredited)
- The Unseen (1945) - Truck Driver (uncredited)
- Both Barrels Blazing (1945) - Lucky Thorpe (uncredited)
- Blazing the Western Trail (1945) - Forrest Brent (uncredited)
- Saratoga Trunk (1945) - Soule Gang Engineer (uncredited)
- She Wouldn't Say Yes (1945) - Conductor (uncredited)
- Road to Utopia (1945) - Ship Captain (uncredited)
- They Were Expendable (1945) - Lieutenant Colonel (uncredited)
- Miss Susie Slagle's (1946) - Cab Driver (uncredited)
- Deadline at Dawn (1946) - Detective Smiley (uncredited)
- The Falcon's Alibi (1946) - Police Inspector Blake
- Shadows Over Chinatown (1946) - Capt. Allen
- My Pal Trigger (1946) - Henry Wallace (uncredited)
- Cowboy Blues (1946) - Jim Peters (uncredited)
- Below the Deadline (1946) - Turner
- Two Years Before the Mast (1946) - Publisher (uncredited)
- Cross My Heart (1946) - Det. Flynn
- It's a Wonderful Life (1946) - Sheriff with arrest warrant (uncredited)
- Alias Mr. Twilight (1946) - Sam Bartlett
- Singin' in the Corn (1946) - Honest John Richards
- The Mighty McGurk (1947) - Toothless Derelict (uncredited)
- California (1947) - Town Marshal (uncredited)
- Nora Prentiss (1947) - NYC Policeman (uncredited)
- The Sin of Harold Diddlebock (1947) - Wild Bill Hickok
- The Michigan Kid (1947) - Sheriff (uncredited)
- Dick Tracy's Dilemma (1947) - Mr. Cudd (uncredited)
- Framed (1947) - Judge (uncredited)
- Robin Hood of Texas (1947) - Sheriff
- Down to Earth (1947) - Police Captain (uncredited)
- Song of the Thin Man (1947) - Nagle - Waterfront Policeman (uncredited)
- The Hal Roach Comedy Carnival (1947) - Bartender, in 'Fabulous Joe'
- The Fabulous Joe (1947) - Florida Club Bartender
- Black Gold (1947) - Dr. Jonas, Veterinarian (uncredited)
- Unconquered (1947) - Militiaman at Fair (uncredited)
- Messenger of Peace (1947) - Harry Franzmeirer
- T-Men (1947) - Agent in Phone Booth (uncredited)
- Road to Rio (1947) - Ship's Officer (uncredited)
- Smart Woman (1948) - Hotel Clerk (uncredited)
- Fury at Furnace Creek (1948) - Lawyer (uncredited)
- Silver River (1948) - Sam Slade
- Unfaithfully Yours (1948) - House Detective
- Quick on the Trigger (1948) - Judge Kormac
- That Wonderful Urge (1948) - Conovan (uncredited)
- The Paleface (1948) - Governor's Horseman (uncredited)
- South of St. Louis (1949) - Farmer (uncredited)
- The Beautiful Blonde from Bashful Bend (1949) - Sheriff Ambrose
- The Doolins of Oklahoma (1949) - Deputy Sheriff (uncredited)
- Trail of the Yukon (1949) - The Drunk (uncredited)
- The Devil's Henchman (1949) - Elmer Hood
- Roseanna McCoy (1949) - Medicine Seller (uncredited)
- The Traveling Saleswoman (1950) - P. Carter (uncredited)
- A Woman of Distinction (1950) - Editor (uncredited)
- North of the Great Divide (1950) - Henry Gates (uncredited)
- The Tougher They Come (1950) - Jensen
- California Passage (1950) - Conover
- Hunt the Man Down (1950) - Ulysses Grant Sheldon (uncredited)
- Oh! Susanna (1951) - Jake Ledbetter
- In Old Amarillo (1951) - Sheriff (uncredited)
- Strangers on a Train (1951) - Tennis Judge (uncredited)
- Utah Wagon Train (1951) - Sam Sickle
- All That I Have (1951) - John Biddle, Gardener
- The Last Musketeer (1952) - Lem Shaver
- We're Not Married! (1952) - Det. Magnus (uncredited)
- Barbed Wire (1952) - McGraw (uncredited)
- Iron Mountain Trail (1953) - The Marshal
- Jubilee Trail (1954) - Mr. Turner (uncredited)
- Hell's Outpost (1954) - Banker (uncredited) (final film role)
