= Valley of Hunted Men =

1942 film

- Directed by: John English
- Written by: William Colt MacDonald; Albert DeMond
- Produced by: Louis Gray
- Starring: Bob Steele; Tom Tyler; Jimmie Dodd
- Cinematography: Bud Thackery
- Edited by: William P. Thompson
- Distributed by: Republic Pictures
- Release date: November 13, 1942
- Running time: 60 minutes
- Country: United States
- Language: English

Valley of Hunted Men is a 1942 American Western "Three Mesquiteers" B-movie directed by John English and starring Bob Steele, Tom Tyler, and Jimmie Dodd.

== Cast ==
- Bob Steele as Tucson Smith
- Tom Tyler as Stony Brooke
- Jimmie Dodd as Lullaby Joslin
- Edward Van Sloan as Dr. Heinrich Steiner
- Roland Varno as Captain Carl Baum / False Paul Schiller
- Anna Marie Stewart as Laura Steiner
- Edythe Elliott as Elisabeth Schiller
- Arno Frey as Counsel Von Breckner
- Richard K. French as Franz Toller (as Richard French)
- Robert R. Stephenson as Kruger (as Robert Stevenson)
- George N. Neise as Paul Schiller (as George Neise)
