= The Cactus Kid (1935 film) =

1935 film

- Directed by: Harry S. Webb
- Written by: Carl Krusada; William L. Nolte
- Produced by: Bernard B. Ray; Harry S. Webb
- Starring: Tom Tyler; Jayne Regan; Philo McCullough
- Cinematography: J. Henry Kruse
- Edited by: Fred Bain
- Production company: Reliable Pictures
- Distributed by: Reliable Pictures
- Release date: 3 January 1935 (US)
- Running time: 58 minutes
- Country: United States
- Language: English

The Cactus Kid is a 1935 American Western film directed by Harry S. Webb and starring Jack Perrin, Jayne Regan and Philo McCullough.

== Cast ==
- Jack Perrin as Cactus Kid
- Fred Humes as Jimmie
- Philo McCullough as Duncan
- Slim Whitaker as Plug
- Joe De La Cruz as Cheyenne
- Jayne Regan as Beth
- Tom London as Sheriff
- Kit Guard as Smiley
- Tina Menard as Rosie
- Hal Taliaferro as Andy

== Bibliography ==
- Pitts, Michael R. Poverty Row Studios, 1929–1940: An Illustrated History of 55 Independent Film Companies, with a Filmography for Each. McFarland & Company, 2005.
