= Thundering Trails =

1943 film

- Theatrical release poster
- Directed by: John English
- Written by: William Colt MacDonald; Robert Yost; Norman S. Hall
- Produced by: Louis Gray
- Starring: Bob Steele; Tom Tyler; Jimmie Dodd
- Cinematography: Reggie Lanning
- Edited by: William P. Thompson
- Distributed by: Republic Pictures
- Release date: January 25, 1943
- Running time: 60 minutes
- Country: United States
- Language: English

Thundering Trails is a 1943 American Western "Three Mesquiteers" B-movie directed by John English and starring Bob Steele, Tom Tyler, and Jimmie Dodd.

== Cast ==
- Bob Steele as Tucson Smith
- Tom Tyler as Stony Brooke
- Jimmie Dodd as Lullaby Joslin
- Nell O'Day as Edith Walker
- Sam Flint as Judge Morgan
- Karl Hackett as Henchman Mollison
- Charles Miller as Texas Ranger Captain Sam Brooke, Stony's Father
- John James as Johnny Brooke, Stony's Brother
- Forrest Taylor as Ben Walker
- Ed Cassidy as Rancher Joe Patterson (as Edward Cassidy)
- Forbes Murray as Commissioner Arthur Howland
- Reed Howes as Henchman Jeff Cantrell
- Bud Geary as Henchman Blake
