= Riders of the Rio Grande =

1943 film

- Theatrical release poster
- Directed by: Howard Bretherton
- Written by: William Colt MacDonald; Albert DeMond
- Produced by: Louis Gray
- Starring: Bob Steele; Tom Tyler; Jimmie Dodd
- Cinematography: Ernest Miller
- Edited by: Charles Craft
- Distributed by: Republic Pictures
- Release date: May 21, 1943
- Running time: 55 minutes
- Country: United States
- Language: English

Riders of the Rio Grande is a 1943 American Western B-movie directed by Howard Bretherton and starring Bob Steele, Tom Tyler, Jimmie Dodd. It is the 51st and final entry in the Three Mesquiteers film series.

== Cast ==
- Bob Steele as Tucson Smith
- Tom Tyler as Stony Brooke
- Jimmie Dodd as Lullaby Joslin
- Lorraine Miller as Janet Owens
- Edward Van Sloan as Pop Owens
- Rick Vallin as Tom Owens
- Harry J. Worth as Sam Skelly
- Roy Barcroft as Sarsaparilla, 1st 'Cherokee Boy'
- Charles King as Thumber, 2nd 'Cherokee Boy'
- Jack Ingram as Henchman Berger
