= Santa Fe Scouts =

1943 film

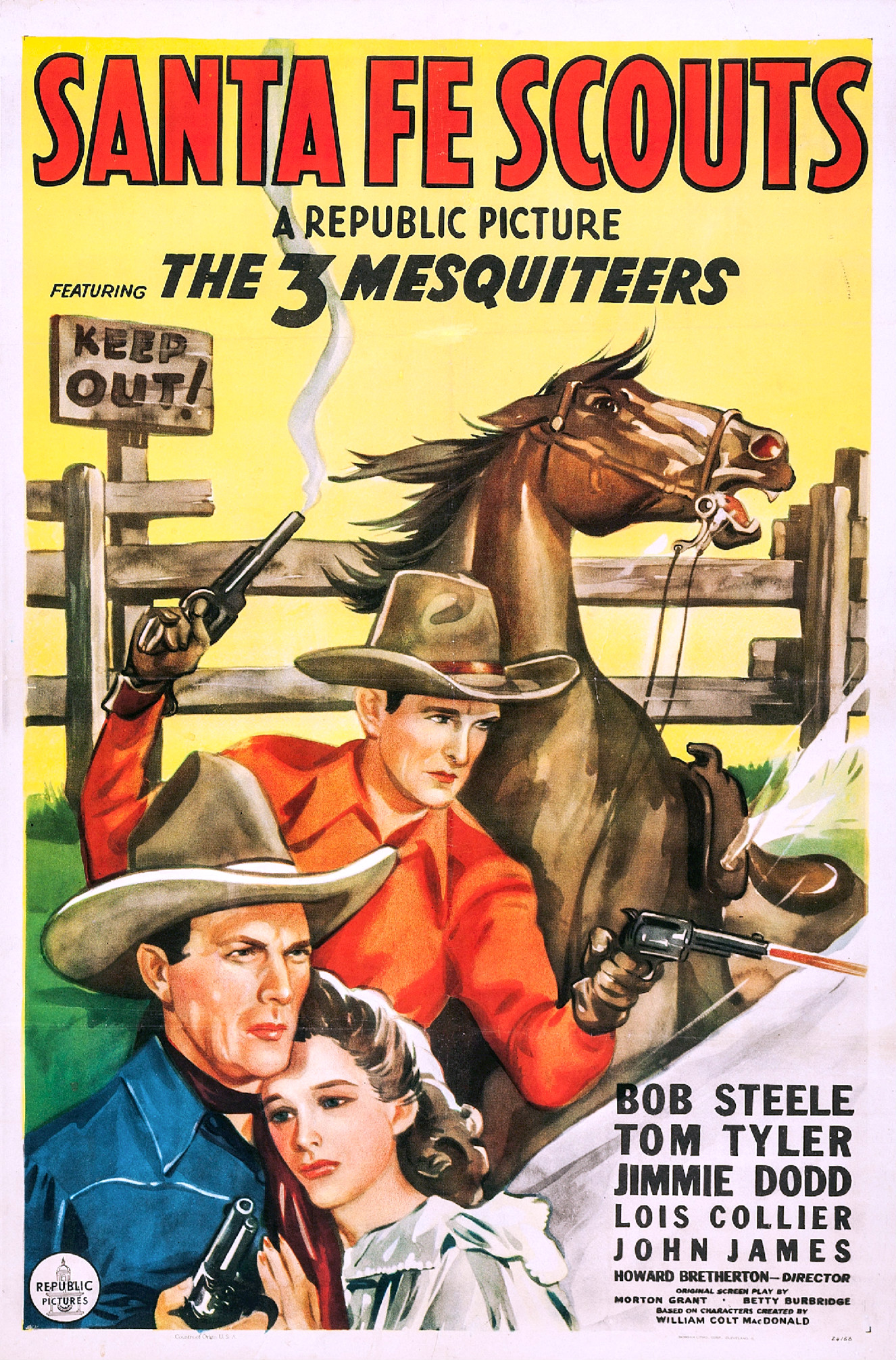
- Theatrical release poster
- Directed by: Howard Bretherton
- Written by: William Colt MacDonald; Betty Burbridge; Morton Grant
- Produced by: Louis Gray
- Starring: Bob Steele; Tom Tyler; Jimmie Dodd
- Cinematography: Reggie Lanning
- Edited by: Charles Craft
- Distributed by: Republic Pictures
- Release date: April 16, 1943
- Running time: 55 minutes
- Country: United States
- Language: English

Santa Fe Scouts is a 1943 American Western "Three Mesquiteers" B-movie directed by Howard Bretherton and starring Bob Steele, Tom Tyler and Jimmie Dodd.

== Cast ==
- Bob Steele as Tucson Smith
- Tom Tyler as Stony Brooke
- Jimmie Dodd as Lullaby Joslin
- Lois Collier as Claire Robbins
- John James as Tim Clay
- Elizabeth Valentine as Minerva Clay
- Tom Chatterton as Neil Morgan
- Tom London as Billy Dawson
- Budd Buster as Wid
- Jack Ingram as Henchman Howard
- Kermit Maynard as Rancher Ben Henderson
