= Tom Tyler =

American actor (1903–1954)

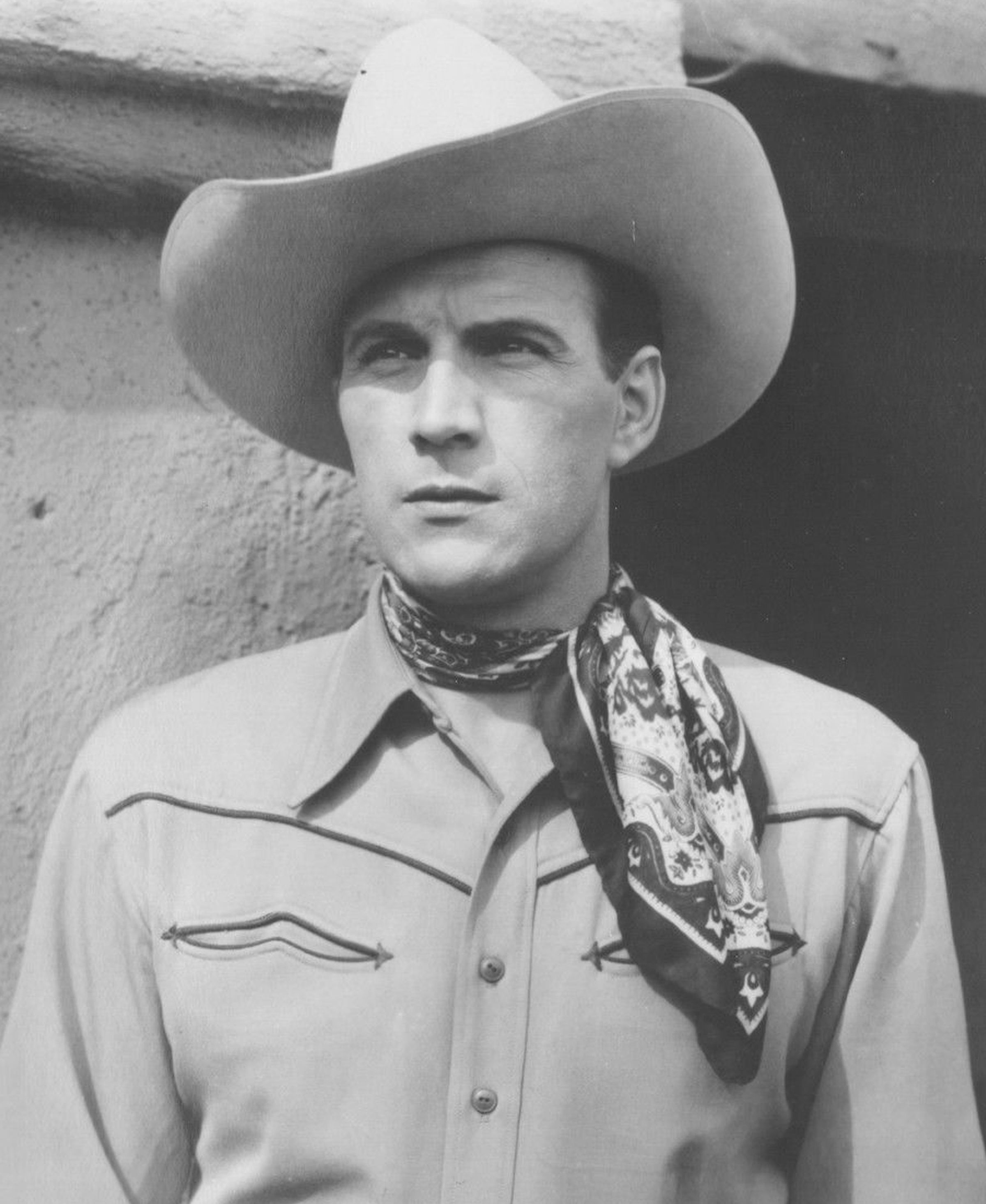
- Born: Vincent Markowski or Vincentas Markauskas; August 9, 1903; Port Henry, New York, U.S.
- Died: May 1, 1954 (aged 50); Hamtramck, Michigan, U.S.
- Resting place: Mount Olivet Cemetery, Detroit
- Occupation: Actor
- Years active: 1924–1953
- Spouse(s): Jeanne Martel (m. 1937; separated late 1940s)

Tom Tyler (August 9, 1903 – May 1, 1954) was an American actor known for his leading roles in low-budget Western films, and for his portrayal of superheroes in movie serials The Adventures of Captain Marvel and The Phantom. Tyler also played the mummy Kharis in the 1940's The Mummy's Hand, a popular film in the Universal Monsters franchise.

== Early years ==
Tyler was born either Vincent Markowski or Vincentas Markauskas (sources differ) in Port Henry, Essex County, New York to Lithuanian-American parents, Helen (née Elena Montvila) and Frank Markowski (nee Pranas Markauskas). he had two brothers: Frank Jr. and Joe (who changed his last name to Marko) and two sisters: Katherine and Maliane (Molly). His father and older brother worked as coal miners for the Witherbee Sherman Company.

In 1913, his family moved to Hamtramck, Michigan, where he attended St. Florian Elementary School and Hamtramck High School. After graduating from high school, he left home and made his way west, finding work as a seaman on a merchant steamer in the U.S. Merchant Marine, a coal miner in Pennsylvania, a lumberjack in the Pacific Northwest, and even a prizefighter.

== Weightlifting ==
Tyler was an amateur weightlifter sponsored by the Los Angeles Athletic Club during the late 1920s. He set a new world's amateur record for the right-hand clean and jerk by lifting 213 pounds (97 kg). In 1928, he won the Amateur Athletic Union (AAU) heavyweight weightlifting championship, lifting 760 pounds (340 kg)—a record that stood for fourteen years.

== Early film career ==
Around 1924, Tyler arrived in California and found work in the film industry as a prop man and extra. His first screen appearances as an extra included Three Weeks (1924), Leatherstocking (1924), and Wild Horse Mesa (1925). In 1925, Tyler was signed to a contract with Film Booking Offices of America (FBO) to star in a series of Western adventures with a starting salary of about $75 per week. His first starring role was in Let's Go, Gallagher (1925). Over the next four years, he starred in 28 additional Westerns for FBO, including The Masquerade Bandit (1926), The Sonora Kid (1927), The Texas Tornado (1928), The Avenging Rider (1928), and Pride of the Pawnee (1929). While romance was generally underplayed in these early Westerns, a number of up-and-coming heroines—including Doris Hill, Jean Arthur, and Nora Lane—contributed to the overall appeal of Tyler's films, which enjoyed critical praise and were popular with Saturday-matinée audiences. His four years with FBO gave him valuable riding and acting experience, and made him a popular cowboy hero in the latter years of the silent-film era.

In 1929, Tyler signed with producer W. Ray Johnston of Syndicate Pictures (later known as Monogram Pictures), where he made his last eight silent films, including The Man from Nevada (1929), Pioneers of the West (1929), The Canyon of Missing Men (1930), and Call of the Desert (1930). Producer Johnston shrewdly recognized that there was still a market for new silent westerns, because many small-town theaters had not yet converted to the new talking pictures.

In 1930, Tyler was loaned out to Mascot Pictures for his first "all-talking" sound film, The Phantom of the West, a ten-chapter cliffhanger featuring a mysterious secret villain and numerous stunts and action sequences. Kermit Maynard, brother of Ken Maynard, was Tyler's stunt double in the more dangerous sequences. In 1931, Tyler made his first Syndicate sound film, West of Cheyenne; his baritone speaking voice recorded well, despite his awkward delivery of lines. Tyler concluded his Syndicate tenure with Rider of the Plains (1931) and God's Country and the Man (1931). He was also strongly considered for the role of Tarzan by MGM in their Tarzan the Ape Man (1932)

== Monogram Pictures ==
Ray Johnston retired Syndicate and renamed the company Monogram Pictures. He signed Tom Tyler to an eight-picture contract as part of the company's sagebrush series. These typical low-budget "quickies" included Man from Death Valley (1931), Single-Handed Sanders (1932), The Man from New Mexico (1932), and Honor of the Mounted (1932), each made for about $8000. All of his Monogram films received critical and popular support. At the time, a small studio would sign a cowboy star for only one year; the studio would then offer a new series with a new cowboy. When Monogram signed Bob Steele to star in the next season's series, Tyler signed with Universal for three serials: Jungle Mystery (1932), Clancy of the Mounted (1933), and Phantom of the Air (1933). During this period he also starred in four low-budget Westerns for John R. Freuler's Monarch Pictures, including The Forty-Niners (1932), When a Man Rides Alone (1933), Deadwood Pass (1933), and War of the Range (1933).

== Reliable Pictures and Victory Pictures ==
In 1934, Tyler signed a two-year contract with Harry S. Webb's Reliable Pictures for eighteen low-budget Western films, tailored as second features on double bills for second- and third-tier movie houses. These films included Mystery Ranch (1934), The Silver Bullet (1935), Born to Battle (1935), Silent Valley (1935), Fast Bullets (1936), and Santa Fe Bound (1936). Despite a few well-done scenes and some good performances by supporting players such as Slim Whitaker, Charles King, Earl Dwire, and even the silent-era "Hebrew" comedian Max Davidson, most of these films were of average quality with production shortcomings that restricted the effectiveness of Tyler's performances. By 1936, companies such as Republic Pictures and Paramount Pictures were producing larger-budget, better-quality Western films with impressive exterior locations that overshadowed the type of Poverty Row low-budget offerings that brought Tyler to fame.

In 1936, Tyler signed a two-year contract with Sam Katzman's new Victory Pictures for eight Western films, each budgeted at about $6000. The first five of these films were directed by Bob Hill and included Cheyenne Rides Again (1937) with Lucile Browne and Feud of the Trail (1937), in which Tyler played a dual role. Two of the Victory features co-starred Tyler's wife, Jeanne Martel: Orphan of the Pecos (1937) and Lost Ranch (1937), the latter containing a rare scene in which Tyler lip syncs two songs, "Tucson Mary" and "Home on the Range" (this being an attempt to compete with the "singing cowboys" then in vogue, like Gene Autry and Tex Ritter). Following Brothers of the West (1937), Katzman did not renew Tyler's contract, replacing him with Tim McCoy as the company's Western star until Katzman suspended production in 1939.

With no starring roles being offered to him, Tyler took a job with the Wallace Brothers Circus in 1938. He returned to Hollywood and appeared in supporting roles and bit parts in several feature films, including John Ford's Stagecoach (1939) with John Wayne, Drums Along the Mohawk (1939) with Henry Fonda, Gone With the Wind (1939) with Clark Gable, The Westerner (1940) with Gary Cooper, John Ford's The Grapes of Wrath (1940) (also with Henry Fonda), and Buck Privates (1941) with Abbott and Costello. His most unusual role was that of the mummy Kharis in Universal's The Mummy's Hand (1940), in which he was cast because the studio felt he resembled a younger Boris Karloff to match stock footage of Karloff from The Mummy (1932).

== Republic Pictures and popular serials ==
In 1941, Tyler signed a two-year contract with Republic Pictures to star in 13 films in the popular Three Mesquiteers series in the role of Stony Brooke opposite Bob Steele playing Tucson Smith, and Rufe Davis or Jimmie Dodd playing Lullaby Joslin. Tyler's $150-per-week salary during the first year was increased to $200 per week for the second year. These final 13 films in the Three Mesquiteers series (39 through 51) represent some of Tyler's best work, and his last leading roles: Outlaws of Cherokee Trail (1941), Gauchos of El Dorado (1941), West of Cimarron (1941), Code of the Outlaw (1942), Raiders of the Range (1942), Westward Ho (1942), The Phantom Plainsmen (1942), Shadows on the Sage (1942), Valley of Hunted Men (1942), Thundering Trails (1943), The Blocked Trail (1943), Santa Fe Scouts (1943), and Riders of the Rio Grande (1943), the last film in the series.

During this period Republic, which failed to secure the rights to Superman, purchased the rights to the comic-book superhero Captain Marvel. In his late 30s at the time, the muscular Tyler was in good shape and was offered the title role at $250 per week for four weeks' work. In the title role in The Adventures of Captain Marvel (1941), Tyler portrayed the first film adaptation of a comic-book superhero.

Tyler's last leading role was in the Columbia Pictures serial The Phantom (1943), based on Lee Falk's comic strip. In costume, Tyler bore a striking resemblance to the Phantom character. Columbia filmed a sequel to The Phantom more than a decade later with actor John Hart wearing the Phantom costume. Unbeknownst to producer Sam Katzman, the studio's rights to the Phantom property had already lapsed. Katzman was forced to salvage the film by renaming the lead character "Captain Africa" and filming additional scenes, with Hart wearing a new costume that only vaguely resembled the Phantom outfit. The patchwork was released as The Adventures of Captain Africa (1955), and footage of Tom Tyler's Phantom appears in some of the long shots.

== Later years ==
The Phantom was Tom Tyler's last starring film. In 1943, the 40-year-old Tyler was diagnosed with severe rheumatoid arthritis, limiting his mobility and confining him to occasional supporting roles in Western films, including San Antonio (1945) with Errol Flynn; They Were Expendable (1945), Red River (1948), and She Wore a Yellow Ribbon (1949) with John Wayne; Badman's Territory (1946) with Randolph Scott; Masked Raiders (1949), Riders of the Range (1950), Rio Grande Patrol (1951), and Road Agent (1952) with Tim Holt; six westerns filmed concurrently in 1950, co-starring Russell Hayden and James Ellison; Trail of Robin Hood (1950) with Roy Rogers; and Best of the Badmen (1951) with Robert Ryan. Tyler was one of the John Ford Stock Company, appearing in six of the director's films.

Beginning in 1950, Tyler transitioned to television work, finding minor roles on The Lone Ranger (1950), Dick Tracy (1950), The Cisco Kid (1950–1951), The Range Rider (1951–1952), and The Roy Rogers Show (1952). He also co-starred with Tom Keene in an unsold TV pilot, Crossroad Avenger (1953), written and directed by Ed Wood.

His final television appearances were in four episodes of The Gene Autry Show in 1952 and 1953.

== Personal life ==
Tyler married actress Jeanne Martel, listed as Jeanne Martel-Pezoldt in California, U.S., County Birth, Marriage, and Death Records, 1849–1980 for Jeanne Martel-Pezoldt in September 1937; they met the previous year while filming Santa Fe Bound, in which she was his leading lady. They appeared in two other films together in 1937, Lost Ranch and Orphan of the Pecos. According to a United States census, they were still married in May 1940; Tyler's own resumé, published in 1947, lists Martel as his wife.

== Death ==
In 1953 Tyler, suffering from severe rheumatoid arthritis and nearly destitute, moved back to Hamtramck and lived with his sister, Katherine Slepski. He died on May 1, 1954, aged 50, of heart failure and complications from scleroderma. He was buried in Mount Olivet Cemetery in Detroit, Michigan. Tyler's last show-business credit was posthumous: an episode of Steve Donovan, Western Marshal called "Comanche Kid." It premiered on January 14, 1956, almost two years after Tyler's passing, but had been filmed as a pilot in 1950. In it, Tyler had difficulty drawing his gun because of his arthritis.

== Filmography ==
- Three Weeks (1924) – Extra (uncredited)
- Leatherstocking (1924) – Indian
- Wild Horse Mesa (1925) – Cowboy
- Let's Go, Gallagher (1925) – Tom Gallagher
- The Wyoming Wildcat (1925) – Phil Stone
- The Only Thing (1925) – Party Guest (uncredited)
- The Cowboy Musketeer (1925) – Tom Latigo
- Ben-Hur: A Tale of the Christ (1925) – Charioteer (uncredited)
- Born to Battle (1926) – Dennis Terhune
- The Arizona Streak (1926) – Dandy Carrell
- Wild to Go (1926) – Tom Blake
- The Masquerade Bandit (1926) – Jeff Morton
- The Cowboy Cop (1926) – Jerry McGill
- Tom and His Pals (1926) – Tom Duffy
- Out of the West (1926) – Tom Hanley
- Red Hot Hoofs (1926) – Tom Buckley
- Lightning Lariats (1927) – Tom Potter
- The Sonora Kid (1927) – Tom MacReady
- Cyclone of the Range (1927) – Tom MacKay
- Splitting the Breeze (1927) – Death Valley Drake
- Tom's Gang (1927) – Dave Collins
- The Flying U Ranch (1927) – Señor Miguel García
- The Cherokee Kid (1927) – Bill Duncan
- The Desert Pirate (1927) – Tom Corrigan
- The Texas Tornado (1928) – Tom Jones
- When the Law Rides (1928) – Tom O'Malley
- Phantom of the Range (1928) – Duke Carlton
- Terror Mountain (1928) – Himself
- The Avenging Rider (1928) – Tom Larkin
- Tyrant of Red Gulch (1928) – Tom Masters
- Trail of the Horse Thieves (1929) – Vic Stanley
- Gun Law (1929) – Tom O'Brien
- Idaho Red (1929) – Andy Thornton
- The Pride of Pawnee (1929) – Kirk Stockton
- The Law of the Plains (1929) – O'Brien
- The Man from Nevada (1929) – Jack Carter
- The Phantom Rider (1929) – Dick Cartwright
- The Lone Horseman (1929) – Jack Gardner
- Pioneers of the West (1929) – Phil Sampson
- 'Neath Western Skies (1929) – Tex McCloud
- Call of the Desert (1930) – Rex Carson
- Half Pint Polly (1930, Short) – Don Wilson
- The Canyon of Missing Men (1930) – Dave Brandon
- Her Man (1930) – Sailor (uncredited)
- The Phantom of the West (1931, serial) – Jim Lester
- West of Cheyenne (1931) – Tom Langdon
- God's Country and the Man (1931) – Tex Malone
- Rider of the Plains (1931) – Blackie Saunders
- Partners of the Trail (1931) – Larry Condon
- The Man from Death Valley (1931) – Dave
- Two Fisted Justice (1931) – "Kentucky" Carson
- Battling with Buffalo Bill (1931) – William Cody
- Galloping Thru (1931) – Tom McGuire
- Single-Handed Sanders (1932) – Matt Sanders
- The Man from New Mexico (1932) – Jess Ryder
- Vanishing Men (1932) – Sheriff Doug Barrett
- Honor of the Mounted (1932) – Constable Tom Halliday
- Jungle Mystery (1932, serial) – Kirk Montgomery
- The Forty-Niners (1932) – "Tennessee" Matthews
- When a Man Rides Alone (1933) – The Llano Kid
- Clancy of the Mounted (1933, serial) – Sergeant Tom Clancy
- The Phantom of the Air (1933, serial) – Bob Raymond
- Deadwood Pass (1933) – Tom
- War of the Range (1933) – Tom Bradley
- Ridin' Thru (1934) – Tom Saunders
- Mystery Ranch (1934) – Bob Morris
- Fighting Hero (1934) – Tom Hall
- Terror of the Plains (1934) – Tom Lansing
- Unconquered Bandit (1935) – Tom Morgan
- Coyote Trails (1935) – Tom Riley
- Tracy Rides (1935) – Sheriff Tom Tracy
- Born to Battle (1935) – "Cyclone" Tom Saunders
- Silent Valley (1935) – Sheriff Tom Hall
- The Silver Bullet (1935) – Tom Henderson
- The Laramie Kid (1935) – Tom Talbot
- Rio Rattler (1935) – Tom Denton
- Powdersmoke Range (1935) – Sundown Saunders
- Trigger Tom (1935) – Tom Hunter
- Fast Bullets (1936) – Ranger Tom Hilton
- Ridin' On (1936) – Tom Roarke
- Roamin' Wild (1936) – Tom Barton
- Pinto Rustlers (1936) – Tom Evans
- The Last Outlaw (1936) – Al Goss
- Santa Fe Bound (1936) – Tom Crenshaw
- Rip Roarin' Buckaroo (1936) – "Scotty" McQuade
- The Phantom of the Range (1936) – Jerry Lane
- Cheyenne Rides Again (1937) – Tom "Cheyenne Tommy" Wade
- Feud of the Trail (1937) – Tom Wade / Jack Granger
- Mystery Range (1937) – Tom Wade
- Orphan of the Pecos (1937) – Tom Rayburn
- Brothers of the West (1937) – Tom Wade
- Lost Ranch (1937) – Tom Wade
- King of Alcatraz (1938) – Gus Banshek
- Stagecoach (1939) – Luke Plummer
- The Night Riders (1939) – Jackson
- Frontier Marshal (1939) – Buck Newton (uncredited)
- Drums Along the Mohawk (1939) – Capt. Morgan (uncredited)
- Gone with the Wind (1939) – Commanding Officer During Evacuation (uncredited)
- The Grapes of Wrath (1940) – Deputy (uncredited)
- The Light of Western Stars (1940) – Sheriff Tom Hawes
- Brother Orchid (1940) – Curley Matthews
- The Westerner (1940) – King Evans
- The Mummy's Hand (1940) – Kharis
- Cherokee Strip (1940) – Frank Lovell
- Texas Rangers Ride Again (1940) – Ranger Gilpin (uncredited)
- Buck Privates (1941) – Ring Announcer at Boxing Match (uncredited)
- Adventures of Captain Marvel (1941, serial) – Captain Marvel
- Border Vigilantes (1941) – Henchman Yager
- Bad Men of Missouri (1941) – Deputy Sheriff Dave (uncredited)
- Outlaws of Cherokee Trail (1941) – Stony Brooke
- Riders of the Timberline (1941) – Henchman Bill Slade
- Gauchos of El Dorado (1941) – "Stony" Brooke
- West of Cimarron (1941) – Stony Brooke
- Code of the Outlaw (1942) – Stony Brooke
- Valley of the Sun (1942) – Geronimo
- Raiders of the Range (1942) – Stony Brooke
- Westward Ho (1942) – Stony Brooke
- The Phantom Plainsmen (1942) – Stony Brooke
- The Talk of the Town (1942) – Clyde Bracken
- Shadows on the Sage (1942) – Stony Brooke
- Valley of Hunted Men (1942) – Stony Brooke
- Thundering Trails (1943) – Stony Brooke
- The Blocked Trail (1943) – Stony Brooke
- Santa Fe Scouts (1943) – Stony Brooke
- Riders of the Rio Grande (1943) – Stony Brooke
- Wagon Tracks West (1943) – Clawtooth
- The Phantom (1943, serial) – Jeffrey Prescott, the Phantom
- Gun to Gun (1944, Short) – Captain Haines (uncredited)
- The Navy Way (1944) – Triangle A Ranch Hand (uncredited)
- Boss of Boomtown (1944) – Jim Ward
- Ladies of Washington (1944) – Agent (uncredited)
- The Princess and the Pirate (1944) – Lieutenant (uncredited)
- Sing Me a Song of Texas (1945) – Steve Andrews
- They Were Expendable (1945) – Captain at Airport (uncredited)
- San Antonio (1945) – Lafe McWilliams
- Badman's Territory (1946) – Frank James
- Never Say Goodbye (1946) – Policeman (uncredited)
- Cheyenne (1947) – Pecos
- The Dude Goes West (1948) – Spiggoty
- Return of the Bad Men (1948) – Wild Bill Yeager
- Red River (1948) – Quitter (uncredited)
- The Golden Eye (1948) – Minor Role (scenes deleted)
- The Three Musketeers (1948) – 1st Traveller (uncredited)
- Blood on the Moon (1948) – Frank Reardon
- I Shot Jesse James (1949) – Frank James
- The Younger Brothers (1949) – Hatch
- The Beautiful Blonde from Bashful Bend (1949) – Townsman (uncredited)
- Lust for Gold (1949) – Luke (uncredited)
- She Wore a Yellow Ribbon (1949) – Cpl. Mike Quayne
- Masked Raiders (1949) – Trig Trevett
- Square Dance Jubilee (1949) – Henchman Buck
- Samson and Delilah (1949) – Gristmill Captain (uncredited)
- Riders of the Range (1950) – The Ringo Kid
- The Daltons' Women (1950) – Emmett Dalton
- Hostile Country (1950) – Tom Brady
- Marshal of Heldorado (1950) – Mike Tulliver
- Crooked River (1950) – Henchman Weston
- Colorado Ranger (1950) – Henchman Pete
- West of the Brazos (1950) – Henchman Sam
- The Lone Ranger (1950, TV Series) – Jeff Garth
- Fast on the Draw (1950) – Outlaw Leader
- Rio Grande Patrol (1950) – Chet Yance
- Dick Tracy (1950, TV Series) – Coffyhead
- Trail of Robin Hood (1950) – Himself
- The Cisco Kid (1950–1951, TV Series) – Sheriff Jim Turner
- The Great Missouri Raid (1951) – Allen Parmer
- Best of the Badmen (1951) – Frank James
- Mysterious Island (1951) – Union Dispatch Rider (uncredited)
- The Adventures of Wild Bill Hickok (1951–1952, TV Series) – Sheriff
- The Roy Rogers Show (1952, TV Series) – Henchman / Andy
- Boston Blackie (1951–1952, TV Series)
- Road Agent (1952) – Larkin – Henchman
- Outlaw Women (1952) – Chillawaka Charlie
- The Lion and the Horse (1952) – Bud Sabin
- What Price Glory (1952) – Capt. Davis (uncredited)
- Sky King (1952, TV Series) – Al
- Cowboy G-Men (1952, TV Series) – Henchman Cactus
- The Range Rider (1951–1952, TV Series) – Shotgun Guard / Indian
- Cow Country (1953) – Pete
- The Gene Autry Show (1952–1953, TV series) – Lanky henchman at Hideout / Slender Thug in the White Hat / Henchman Snake-Eye
