= The Blocked Trail =

1943 film

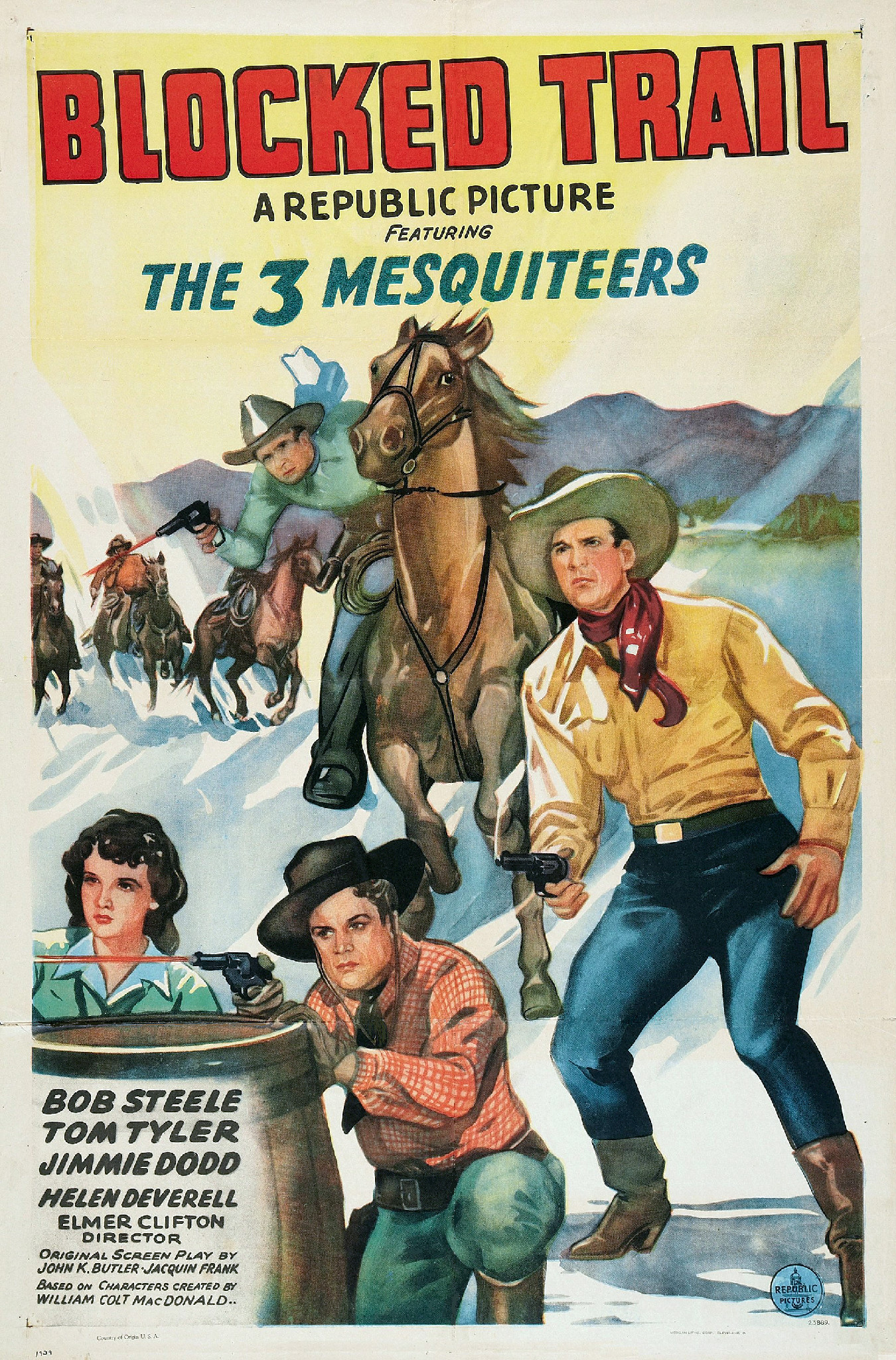
- Theatrical release poster
- Directed by: Elmer Clifton
- Written by: William Colt MacDonald; John K. Butler; Jacquin Frank
- Produced by: Louis Gray
- Starring: Bob Steele; Tom Tyler; Jimmie Dodd
- Cinematography: Bud Thackery
- Edited by: Edward Schroeder
- Distributed by: Republic Pictures
- Release date: March 12, 1943
- Running time: 55 minutes
- Country: United States
- Language: English

The Blocked Trail is a 1943 American Western "Three Mesquiteers" B-movie directed by Elmer Clifton and starring Bob Steele, Tom Tyler, and Jimmie Dodd.

== Cast ==
- Bob Steele as Tucson Smith
- Tom Tyler as Stony Brooke
- Jimmie Dodd as Lullaby Joslin
- Helen Deverell as Ann Martin
- George J. Lewis as Freddy (as George Lewis)
- Walter Soderling as 'Mad' Martin
- Charles Miller as Frank Nolan (as Charkes F. Miller)
- Kermit Maynard as Henchman Reese
- Pierce Lyden as Henchman Rankin
- Carl Mathews as Henchman Lon
- Hal Price as Sheriff Pillsbury
- Budd Buster as Deputy 'Bets' McGee
