= John English (film director) =

1903–1969; British-born American film editor and film director

- Born: John Wilkinson English; 25 June 1903; Cumberland, United Kingdom
- Died: 11 October 1969 (aged 66); Los Angeles, California, United States
- Other names: John W. English; Jack English
- Occupations: Film director, film editor

John Wilkinson English (25 June 1903 – 11 October 1969) was a British film editor and film director. He is most famous for the film serials he co-directed with William Witney for Republic Pictures such as Zorro's Fighting Legion and Drums of Fu Manchu.

He was credited variously as John W English, John English or Jack English.

== Career ==
John English was born in Cumberland in the United Kingdom but moved to Canada at an early age. He first worked as a film editor before getting a break into directing at Republic in 1935.

For a period in the 1930s and 1940s, starting with Zorro Rides Again (1937), he directed movie serials in partnership with William Witney. It was customary at the time for two directors to work on each serial, each working on alternate days. Witney customarily worked on the action scenes while English concentrated on character and story elements. Together they are regarded as having produced the best examples of the serial medium:

most notable of all were the directing talents of William Witney and John English. Together they directed seventeen consecutive serials, honing an approach that allowed Republic serials to far outdistance the competition. They adopted a no-nonsense approach that treated the serial material with respect and rarely gave any clues that we shouldn't consider the stories seriously. Other directors would allow an element of goofiness to gradually seep into the serial. For example, few people would point to a Witney/English serial as an example of camp, unlike the Flash Gordon serials.

— Gary Johnson, from Images Journal

They directed seventeen serials as a partnership and a few others separately, such as Captain America (1944) in John English's case.

Following disagreement with management changes at Republic's serial team, he moved to directing features films, mostly the B-Western films for which Republic was known. In the post war era whilst William Witney directed a series of Roy Rogers films for Republic, English directed a series of Gene Autry pictures for Columbia Pictures.

In the 1952-1953 television season, English directed several episodes of Alan Hale, Jr.'s Biff Baker, U.S.A. espionage series on CBS. He thereafter directed twelve episodes of the CBS western series My Friend Flicka (1956–1957), and 18 episodes of Lassie (1954 TV series) (1964–1965). English also directed several episodes of The Gene Autry Show, The Adventures of Champion, Annie Oakley, and The Roy Rogers Show.

When Republic collapsed as a studio in 1959, he continued directing television episodes at the same studio lot.

== Selected filmography ==
As director

- His Fighting Blood (1935)
- Red Blood of Courage (1935)
- Arizona Days (1937)
- Whistling Bullets (1937)
- Call the Mesquiteers (1938)
- Hi-Yo Silver (1940)
- Gangs of Sonora (1941)
- Code of the Outlaw (1942)
- The Phantom Plainsmen (1942)
- Raiders of the Range (1942)
- Valley of Hunted Men (1942)
- Westward Ho (1942)
- The Yukon Patrol (1942)
- Dead Man's Gulch (1943)
- Death Valley Manhunt (1943)
- Drums of Fu Manchu (1943)
- The Fighting Devil Dogs (1943)
- The Man from Thunder River (1943)
- Overland Mail Robbery (1943)
- Raiders of Sunset Pass (1943)
- Thundering Trails (1943)
- The Black Hills Express (1943)
- Faces in the Fog (1944)
- Call of the South Seas (1944)
- The Laramie Trail (1944)
- The Port of Forty Thieves (1944)
- San Fernando Valley (1944)
- Silver City Kid (1944)
- Behind City Lights (1945)
- Don't Fence Me In (1945)
- Grissly's Millions (1945)
- The Phantom Speaks (1945)
- Utah (1945)
- Murder in the Music Hall (1946)
- The Last Round-Up (1947)
- Trail to San Antone (1947)
- The Strawberry Roan (1948)
- Loaded Pistols (1949)
- Riders in the Sky (1949)
- Riders of the Whistling Pines (1949)
- Rim of the Canyon (1949)
- Sons of New Mexico (1949)
- The Cowboy and the Indians (1949)
- Beyond the Purple Hills (1950)
- The Blazing Sun (1950)
- Cow Town (1950)
- Indian Territory (1950)
- Mule Train (1950)
- Sons of New Mexico (1950)
- Gene Autry and the Mounties (1951)
- The Hills of Utah (1951)
- Silver Canyon (1951)
- Valley of Fire (1951)
- Whirlwind (1951)

As editor

- Aces and Eights (1936)
- Becky (1927)
- Clear the Decks (1929)
- Meet the Wife (1931)
- The Code of the Mounted (1935)
- Crashing Through Danger (1938)
- The Exquisite Sinner (1926)
- Ghost Patrol (1936) (cred
- Heaven on Earth (1927)
- Hold Your Man (1929)
- Lightnin' Bill Carson (1936)
- The Lion's Den (1936)
- The Lovelorn (1927)
- Mockery (1927)
- Northern Frontier (1935)
- Red Hot Speed (1929)
- Trails of the Wild (1935)
- The Traitor (1936)
- The Understanding Heart (1927)
- Wilderness Mail (1935)
