= Arizona Nights =

1927 film directed by Lloyd Ingraham

- Film poster
- Directed by: Lloyd Ingraham
- Written by: Hal Conklin; Stewart Edward White
- Starring: Fred Thomson; Nora Lane; William Courtright
- Cinematography: Ross Fisher
- Production company: Film Booking Offices of America
- Distributed by: Film Booking Offices of America
- Release date: August 28, 1927
- Running time: 7 reels
- Country: United States
- Language: Silent (English intertitles)

Arizona Nights is a 1927 American silent Western film directed by Lloyd Ingraham and starring Fred Thomson, Nora Lane, and William Courtright. It was adapted from the 1907 story of the same name by Stewart Edward White.

== Plot ==
This synopsis is taken from the Library of Congress Motion Picture Descriptions Collection.

The good-hearted Fred Coulter works on a mining claim with little success. He is romantically interested in Ruth Browning, the niece of Aunt Agatha, who owns of the town lunch room.

Scoundrel Jeff Decker has allied himself with Red Dog, the leader of a Native American tribe. They are continually raiding the town of Coldwater. Decker plans to make a speedy "clean-up," by buying all the horses in town and starting a false rumor of a gold strike fifty miles from town in a place called Lone Pine. He hires Fred to buy the horses, which Decker will later sell for a profit.

Decker spreads the story of a fake gold strike, which allows him to set his own prices for the horses. He tells Ruth of his plans, and he asks her to marry and leave town with him. However, she refuses his proposal.

Fred detonates charges of explosives when he is attacked by Native warriors, and the explosions uncover gold. He rides his horse, Silver King, back to Coldwater where Ruth informs him that the Lone Pine gold strike isn't real. Leaving Silver King with Ruth, Fred borrows another horse and rides off to inform the miners.

At Coldwater, Decker and the Native tribe ready themselves to raid the town. To ward off the attack, the remaining townsfolk gather in the general store. Silver King witnesses a Native warrior fall in the first attack. Silver King picks up the warrior's headdress and gallops to Lone Pine.

In the meantime, Fred finds and informs the miners of the deception. Silver King arrives with the headdress, alarming the men and causing them to hurry back to Coldwater. Fred arrives first and, "by a clever ruse sets the Indians to rout." After a fierce struggle, Fred overpowers and defeats Decker. Fred and Ruth reunite.

== Cast ==
- Fred Thomson as Fred Coulter
- Nora Lane as Ruth Browning
- J.P. McGowan as Jeff Decker
- William Courtright as Bill Barrow
- Lottie Williams as Aunt Agatha
- Merrill McCormick as Speed Lester
- Dan Peterson as Red Dog
- Silver King as Coulter's Horse

== Preservation ==
With no holdings located in archive, Arizona Nights is considered a lost film.

== Bibliography ==
- Donald W. McCaffrey & Christopher P. Jacobs. Guide to the Silent Years of American Cinema. Greenwood Publishing, 1999. ISBN 0-313-30345-2
