= North of Arizona =

1935 film directed by Harry S. Webb

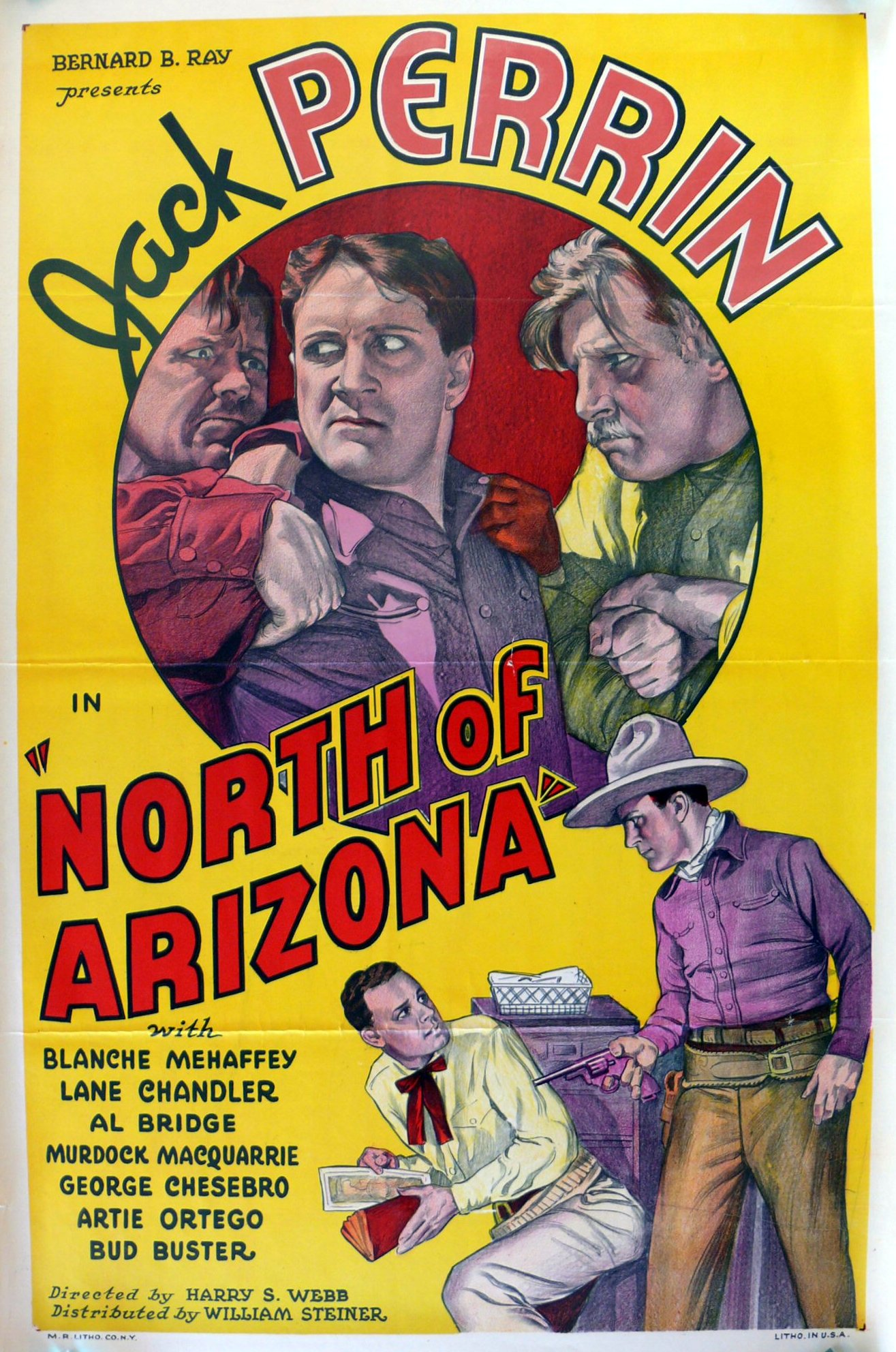
- Directed by: Harry S. Webb
- Written by: Carl Krusada; Rose Gordon
- Produced by: Bernard B. Ray; Harry S. Webb
- Starring: Jack Perrin; Blanche Mehaffey; Lane Chandler
- Cinematography: J. Henry Kruse
- Edited by: William Austin
- Production company: Reliable Pictures
- Distributed by: Reliable Pictures
- Release date: February 1, 1935
- Running time: 60 minutes
- Country: United States
- Language: English

North of Arizona is a 1935 American Western film directed by Harry S. Webb and starring Jack Perrin, Blanche Mehaffey and Lane Chandler. It was a low-budget B film made by Reliable Pictures and produced by Bernard B. Ray. Rose Gordon, vice president of Reliable Pictures, is credited as continuity supervisor.

== Plot ==
Jack Loomis is a roaming cowboy who is new to town and looking for work. A bartender tells Loomis to talk to George Tully. Tully turns him down, having no room for new hands, and Jack returns to the bar.

Meanwhile, Red Cloud and Grey Wolf are playing cards with two men and selling their product. The men ask them to sell interest in their product instead of the product outright. When Red Cloud refuses, they try to get Red Cloud and Grey Wolf drunk, seemingly to swindle them out of their product. After several refusals, Loomis intervenes, warning the men to stop, and Tully steps in as well. Afterwards, Tully agrees to hire Loomis.

Once Jack is gone, Tully's gamblers, Dick and Joe, approach him and ask why he would hire Jack. Tully assures the workers that Jack is only a dummy foreman and will be the fall guy for their next plot.

Jack begins working as Tully's foreman. Red Cloud and Grey Wolf exit their teepee and leave to transport their product, carrying it in gunny sacks when Dick and Joe catch them and attempt to steal the product. On horseback, Jack comes to their aid. The workers accuse Jack of trying to get a piece of the product as well. Jack accuses them of theft and a brawl ensues. The workers run off on horseback and Jack rescues Red Cloud and Grey Wolf.

Jack enters the Herrons' store where Marge is working as cashier. Jack flirts with Marge and asks her to pick some clothes for him. Marge selects a bandana for him and Jack tries it on. Jack asks Marge to go to a show with him and Marge agrees. Ray, spotting the interaction, intervenes and tries to stop Marge from interacting with Jack, saying it's his job to look after Marge while Mr. Herron is away. Ray attacks Jack and a fight ensues. Mr. Herron appears and the fighting stops. Jack confirms his date with Marge and leaves. Ray tells Mr. Herron that he doesn't trust Jack because he works for the Tully, the "biggest crook" in the county. Mr. Herron tells Ray he shouldn't judge Jack offhand.

Ray confirms to one of Tully's workers that the "shipment" is inside the express office and that they close at 8:00, a half-hour before Jack is supposed to pick Marge up for their date. When Jack arrives, he tries to prevent a hold-up at the office and fights the first robber, Joe. Jack fails and is knocked down and watches Joe ride away. He goes inside and fights the other robber, Dick, where he finds Ray is tied up. Marge spots the robbery from her store and warns her father about the robbery. When Marge and Mr. Herron arrive at the scene, Ray and Dick accuse Jack of the robbery and say they witnessed him trying to rob the safe. Mr. Herron says they will take Jack to jail. Jack shoots the wall and flees on horseback before they can take him.

Dick and Joe go to Tully and explain what happened and that Jack has fled. They also inform him there's a $1,000 bounty on Jack's head.

On the run, Jack spots the flyer with his reward on it. Jack is on horseback and is captured by Tully and his men while on the road. Tully explains Jack spoiled the robbery but Jack can make money if he helps Tully on the next shipment. Jack pulls his gun on the men, takes their weapons, and assures them he won't be part of their schemes. Jack flees again. Tully tells his men to go after Jack so they can split the $1,000 reward. They chase Jack on horseback, push him off of his horse, and fight him. Jack wins the fight and flees on horseback to the Native Americans’ home. Red Cloud and Grey Wolf welcome him, dress him in a war bonnet and native clothing to disguise him. Jack goes to the store disguised and writes Madge a note at the cashier warning her about what’s about to happen. Madge realizes it’s Jack, pulls a gun and warns him not to move. Jack accuses her of selling him out for the reward. Madge pleads that as Mr. Herron is the town marshal, she has to participate. Mr. Herron and Ray handcuff Jack and try to take him to jail, but Jack attacks Ray and runs off on horseback.

Jack returns to Red Cloud’s teepee and asks for help removing the handcuffs. Jack tells Red Cloud he has another scheme. Jack returns to Tully and asks to join his scheme. Tully suspects that Jack wants to double-cross him but vows to beat him at his own game and agrees. Jack participates in the robbery, stealing a man’s wagon and telling him to run. Jack and Dick discover a trunk with at least $10,000 worth of gold in the wagon, to which Dick insists he drive the carriage back to Tully. Jack refuses, the two fight, and Dick drives off with the money. Jack chases him on horseback, hijacks his wagon, and knocks Dick out. Jack brings the wagon to Red Cloud and Grey Wolf, who remove the gold and help him fill it with trifles. Red Coud and Grey Wolf go to the store with the gold and Jack’s bandana. They lock the gold away in the express office safe.

Jack goes to Tully with the trunk. When Tully and his men open up the false trunk, Jack holds them at gunpoint and forces them to sign a confession, which starts a brawl. Mr. Herron, Marge, and the other townsfolk arrive and take away Tully and the others to jail. Jack shows Mr. Herron the signed confession. Mr. Herron offers him a job to replace him as town marshal, and Marge returns the bandana to Jack.

== Cast ==
- Jack Perrin as Jack Loomis
- Blanche Mehaffey as Madge Herron
- Lane Chandler as Ray Keeler
- Al Bridge as George Tully
- Murdock MacQuarrie as Elmer Herron
- George Chesebro as Dick
- Artie Ortego as Red Cloud
- Budd Buster as Grey Wolf

== Bibliography ==
- Pitts, Michael R. Poverty Row Studios, 1929–1940: An Illustrated History of 55 Independent Film Companies, with a Filmography for Each. McFarland & Company, 2005.
