= Fighting Hero =

1934 film directed by Harry S. Webb

- Directed by: Harry S. Webb
- Written by: Charles E. Roberts; Carl Krusada; Rose Gordon
- Produced by: Bernard B. Ray; Harry S. Webb
- Starring: Tom Tyler; Edward Hearn
- Cinematography: J. Henry Kruse
- Edited by: Fred Bain
- Production company: Reliable Pictures
- Distributed by: Reliable Pictures
- Release date: June 17, 1934
- Running time: 59 minutes
- Country: United States
- Language: English

Fighting Hero is a 1934 American pre-Code Western film directed by Harry S. Webb and starring Tom Tyler and Edward Hearn.

== Cast ==
- Tom Tyler as Tom Hall
- Renee Borden as Conchita Alvarez
- Edward Hearn as Bert Hawley
- Dick Botiller as Dick
- Ralph Lewis as The Judge
- Murdock MacQuarrie as Prosecutor
- Nelson McDowell as Bailiff
- Tom London as Sheriff
- George Chesebro as Deputy
- Rosa Rosanova as Aunt
- J.P. McGowan as Morales

== Bibliography ==
- Pitts, Michael R. Poverty Row Studios, 1929–1940: An Illustrated History of 55 Independent Film Companies, with a Filmography for Each. McFarland & Company, 2005.
