= The Pioneer Scout =

1928 film

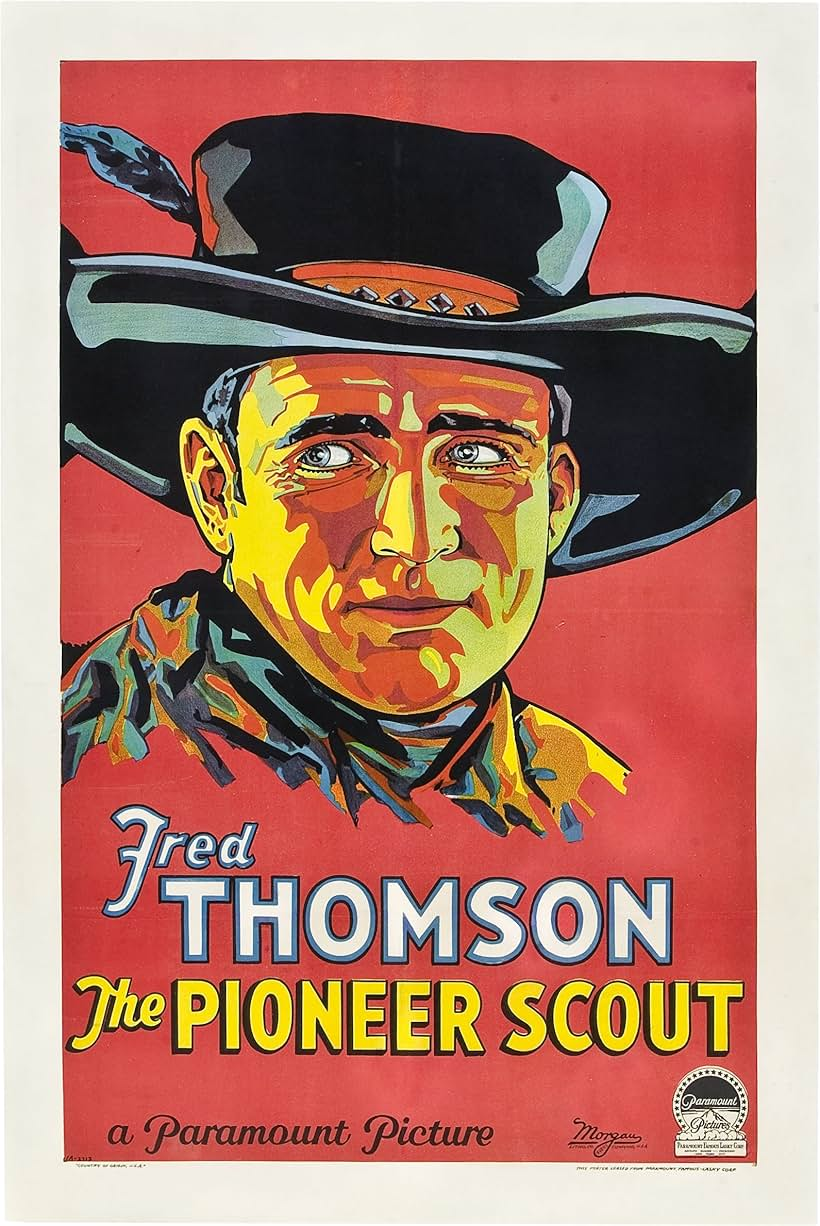
- Theatrical release poster
- Directed by: Lloyd Ingraham; Alfred L. Werker
- Screenplay by: Garrett Graham; Frances Marion
- Produced by: Jesse L. Lasky; Adolph Zukor
- Starring: Fred Thomson; Nora Lane; William Courtright
- Cinematography: Mack Stengler
- Edited by: Duncan Mansfield
- Production company: Famous Players–Lasky Corporation
- Distributed by: Paramount Pictures
- Release date: January 21, 1928
- Running time: 65 minutes
- Country: United States
- Language: Silent (English intertitles)

The Pioneer Scout is a 1928 American silent Western film directed by Lloyd Ingraham and Alfred L. Werker and written by Garrett Graham and Frances Marion. The film stars Fred Thomson, Nora Lane, William Courtright, and Tom Wilson. The film was released on January 21, 1928, by Paramount Pictures.

== Cast ==
- Fred Thomson as Fred
- Nora Lane as Mary Baxter
- William Courtright as Old Bill
- Tom Wilson as Handy Anderson
- Charles Murray (uncredited)
