= The Gun Runner (1928 film) =

1928 film

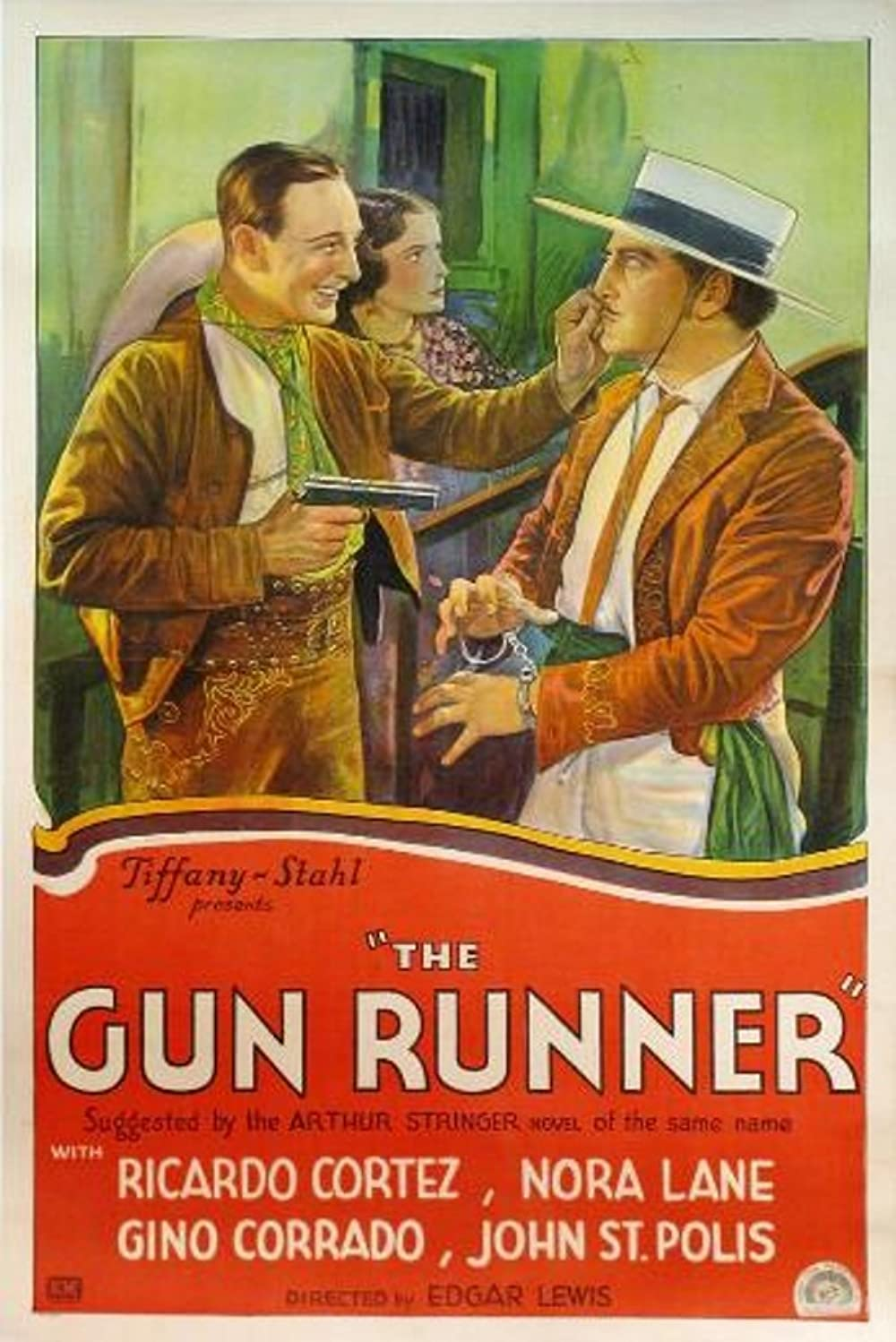
- Directed by: Edgar Lewis
- Written by: Jack Natteford; Paul Perez
- Based on: The Gun Runner by Arthur Stringer
- Produced by: John M. Stahl
- Starring: Ricardo Cortez; Nora Lane; Gino Corrado
- Cinematography: Harry Jackson
- Edited by: Sherman Kell
- Production company: Tiffany Pictures
- Distributed by: Tiffany Pictures
- Release date: November 20, 1928
- Running time: 60 minutes
- Country: United States
- Languages: Silent; English intertitles

The Gun Runner is a 1928 American silent adventure film directed by Edgar Lewis and starring Ricardo Cortez, Nora Lane and Gino Corrado. The film was based on the 1909 novel of the same title by Arthur Stringer. It was made and released by Tiffany Pictures during John M. Stahl's period as head of production for the studio.

== Synopsis ==
In a troubled republic in Central America Julio is ordered by the president to track down a notorious gunrunner in the hills by the frontier. While there he falls in love with Inez, an innkeeper, before discovering that she the brother of Garcia the man he is trying to capture.

== Cast ==
- Ricardo Cortez as Julio
- Nora Lane as Inez
- Gino Corrado as Garcia
- John St. Polis as The Presidente

== Bibliography ==
- Munden, Kenneth White. The American Film Institute Catalog of Motion Pictures Produced in the United States, Part 1. University of California Press, 1997.
