= Galloping Thru =

1931 film

- Directed by: Lloyd Nosler
- Screenplay by: Wellyn Totman
- Produced by: Trem Carr
- Starring: Tom Tyler; Betty Mack; Alan Bridge; Si Jenks; Stanley Blystone; Gordon De Main
- Cinematography: Archie Stout
- Edited by: Charles J. Hunt
- Production company: Monogram Pictures
- Distributed by: Monogram Pictures
- Release date: December 5, 1931
- Running time: 58 minutes
- Country: United States
- Language: English

Galloping Thru is a 1931 American Western film directed by Lloyd Nosler and written by Wellyn Totman. The film stars Tom Tyler, Betty Mack, Alan Bridge, Si Jenks, Stanley Blystone and Gordon De Main. The film was released on December 5, 1931, by Monogram Pictures.

== Cast ==
- Tom Tyler as Tom McGuire
- Betty Mack as Janice Warren
- Alan Bridge as Sandy Thompson
- Si Jenks as Doctor
- Stanley Blystone as Wallis
- Gordon De Main as Cliff Warren
- John Elliott as Mr. Winton
- Artie Ortego as Stagecoach Driver
