= Terror of the Plains =

1934 film directed by Harry S. Webb

- Directed by: Harry S. Webb
- Written by: Jayne Regan; Rose Gordon; Carl Krusada
- Produced by: Bernard B. Ray; Harry S. Webb
- Starring: Tom Tyler; Roberta Gale; William Gould
- Cinematography: J. Henry Kruse
- Edited by: Fred Bain
- Production company: Reliable Pictures
- Distributed by: Reliable Pictures
- Release date: November 22, 1934
- Running time: 58 minutes
- Country: United States
- Language: English

Terror of the Plains is a 1934 American Western film directed by Harry S. Webb and starring Tom Tyler, Roberta Gale and William Gould.

== Cast ==
- Tom Tyler as Tom Lansing - Posing as Tom Smith
- Roberta Gale as Bess Roberts
- William Gould as Kirk Cramer - aka Butcher Wells
- Slim Whitaker as Nevada - Henchman
- Fern Emmett as Rose
- Nelson McDowell as Parson Jones
- Frank Rice as Banty - Tom's Sidekick
- Ralph Lewis as Dad Lansing
- Robert Walker as Sheriff
- Murdock MacQuarrie as Cole - Foreman

== Bibliography ==
- Pitts, Michael R. Poverty Row Studios, 1929–1940: An Illustrated History of 55 Independent Film Companies, with a Filmography for Each. McFarland & Company, 2005.
