= J. Henry Kruse =

American cinematographer

- Born: March 20, 1870; Mendocino, California, United States
- Died: January 1, 1944 (age 73); Marin County, California, United States
- Other name: James Henry Kruse
- Occupation: Cinematographer
- Years active: 1924–1938 (film)

J. Henry Kruse (1870–1954) was an American cinematographer. He worked frequently for Reliable Pictures in the mid-1930s. He also shot the 1938 Spanish-language film La vida bohemia for director Edgar G. Ulmer.

== Selected filmography ==
- Breed of the Border (1924)
- The Reckoning (1932)
- House of Danger (1934)
- Rawhide Mail (1934)
- Ridin' Thru (1934)
- Fighting Hero (1934)
- Mystery Ranch (1934)
- Terror of the Plains (1934)
- The Silver Bullet (1935)
- Born to Battle (1935)
- The Live Wire (1935)
- Coyote Trails (1935)
- Tracy Rides (1935)
- Texas Jack (1935)
- Silent Valley (1935)
- The Laramie Kid (1935)
- On Probation (1935)
- North of Arizona (1935)
- The Cactus Kid (1935)
- Wolf Riders (1935)
- Loser's End (1935)
- The Test (1935)
- Now or Never (1935)
- Unconquered Bandit (1935)
- Circus Shadows (1935)
- Desert Guns (1936)
- La vida bohemia (1938)
- The Duke Is Tops (1938)

== Bibliography ==
- Herzogenrath, Bernd. The Films of Edgar G. Ulmer. Scarecrow Press, 2009.
- Pitts, Michael R. Poverty Row Studios, 1929–1940: An Illustrated History of 55 Independent Film Companies, with a Filmography for Each. McFarland & Company, 2005.
