= Ridin' Thru =

1934 film directed by Harry S. Webb

- Directed by: Harry S. Webb
- Written by: Carol Shandrew; Rose Gordon; Carl Krusada
- Produced by: Bernard B. Ray; Harry S. Webb
- Starring: Tom Tyler; Ruth Hiatt; Lafe McKee
- Cinematography: J. Henry Kruse
- Edited by: Fred Bain
- Production company: Reliable Pictures
- Distributed by: Reliable Pictures
- Release date: March 15, 1934
- Running time: 55 minutes
- Country: United States
- Language: English

Ridin' Thru is a 1934 American pre-Code Western film directed by Harry S. Webb and starring Tom Tyler, Ruth Hiatt and Lafe McKee.

== Cast ==
- Tom Tyler as Tom Saunders
- Ruth Hiatt as Dolores Brooks
- Lafe McKee as Elmer 'Dad' Brooks
- Philo McCullough as Winthrop
- Ben Corbett as Barney
- Lew Meehan as Henchman Joe
- Bud Osborne as Sheriff
- Jayne Regan as Ranch Guest

== Bibliography ==
- Pitts, Michael R. Poverty Row Studios, 1929–1940: An Illustrated History of 55 Independent Film Companies, with a Filmography for Each. McFarland & Company, 2005.
