= Orphan of the Pecos =

- Theatrical release poster
- Directed by: Sam Katzman
- Written by: Basil Dickey
- Produced by: Sam Katzman
- Starring: Tom Tyler; Jeanne Martel; Howard Bryant; Forrest Taylor
- Cinematography: William Hyer
- Edited by: Holbrook N. Todd
- Production company: Victory Pictures
- Distributed by: Victory Pictures
- Release date: December 30, 1937 (USA)
- Running time: 55 minutes
- Country: United States
- Language: English

Orphan of the Pecos is a 1937 American Western film produced and directed by Sam Katzman and starring Tom Tyler, Jeanne Martel, Howard Bryant, and Forrest Taylor. Written by Basil Dickey, the film is about a cowboy who is falsely accused of murdering a rancher whose body he discovers. Before the sheriff arrives, he escapes and tries to find evidence to clear his name and help the rancher's daughter save her ranch. The film was released in the United States on December 30, 1937 by Victory Pictures.

== Plot ==
Rancher Hank Gelbert (Lafe McKee) receives a visit from his foreman, Jess Brand (Forrest Taylor), who wants to see Gelbert's daughter Ann. Knowing that Brand is only interested in Ann getting money to pay off his gambling debts, Gelbert tells him to clear off his property. As Gelbert opens his safe to pay Brand his last wages, Brand shoots him and takes off with the money. On the road, he encounters Ann (Jeanne Martel) and tries to persuade her that he loves her, but she does not trust him, knowing he only wants to marry her to get the ranch.

Meanwhile, cowboy Tom Rayburn (Tom Tyler), a stranger to the area looking for work, encounters a patent medicine salesman and ventriloquist, Jeremiah Mathews (Theodore Lorch), on the road outside town. While Tom is amused by the salesman's talents, he declines to purchase any of his 'medicine', Kuro, and continues on to the Gelbert ranch, where he discovers Gelbert's body. When Ann and Brand arrive at the ranch, Ann finds Tom leaning over the body and assumes that he murdered her father. While pretending to search Tom, Brand plants the stolen money in his pocket and announces what he 'found'. He then encourages Ann to shoot him, but she chooses to let the law handle it.

While they wait for the sheriff to arrive, Tom and Brand fight and Brand is knocked unconscious. As Tom prepares to leave, Ann picks up Tom's gun and threatens to shoot him, but he knows she will not do it. He takes his gun, tells her he will return, and then leaves. Later that night, Tom returns to the ranch and shows Ann the letter he received from her father offering him the foreman's job. He points out that Brand had more to gain from her father's death than he did. Ann believes him and gives him her father's coat.

Tom heads into town and finds Mathews, the only witness who can prove his innocence. Brand sees them talking and kidnaps Mathews and takes him to a shack, where he instructs him to sign a document that would undermine Tom's alibi. Meanwhile, Tom discovers Mathews' abandoned car, locates the shack, and frees the medicine salesman.

After Tom returns to the Gelbert ranch, he and Ann see Brand approaching. Ann urges Tom to stay hidden while she gets rid of Brand. In the house, Tom gets the draw on Brand and the three wait for Mathews to arrive. When he shows up he provides Tim with a clear alibi. Using his skills as a ventriloquist, Mathews throws his voice and pretends to be the dead Gelbert, unsettling Brand to the point where he confesses to the murder. Brand's men arrive and during the ensuing fight, Ann and Mathews manage to escape. Tom also escapes with Brand and his men in pursuit. Along the trail, Tom doubles back and captures Brand and his men. When Ann arrives, she offers Tom the foreman position at her ranch and he accepts.

== Cast ==
- Tom Tyler as Tom Rayburn
- Jeanne Martel as Ann Gelbert
- Howard Bryant as Pete
- Slim Whitaker as Sheriff
- Theodore Lorch as Jeremiah Mathews
- Forrest Taylor as Jess Brand
- Marjorie Beebe as Mrs. Barnes
- Lafe McKee as Hank Gelbert
- Roger Williams as Slim
