= The Texas Tornado (1928 film) =

1928 film

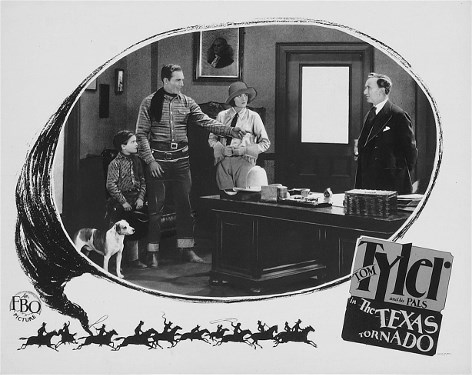
- Directed by: Frank Howard Clark
- Written by: Randolph Bartlett; Frank Howard Clark
- Starring: Tom Tyler; Frankie Darro; Nora Lane
- Cinematography: E.M. MacManigal
- Edited by: Pandro S. Berman
- Production company: Film Booking Offices of America
- Distributed by: Film Booking Offices of America
- Release date: February 18, 1928
- Running time: 55 minutes
- Country: United States
- Languages: Silent; English intertitles

The Texas Tornado is a lost 1928 American silent Western film directed by Frank Howard Clark and starring Tom Tyler, Frankie Darro and Nora Lane.

== Cast ==
- Tom Tyler as Tom Jones
- Frankie Darro as Buddy Martin
- Nora Lane as Ellen Briscoe
- Jack Anthony as Bill Latimer
- Frank Whitson as Jim Briscoe
- Bob Burns as Sheriff
- Bob Reeves as Henchman at Bank

== Preservation ==
With no holdings located in archives, The Texas Tornado is considered a lost film.

== Bibliography ==
- Pitts, Michael R. Western Movies: A Guide to 5,105 Feature Films. McFarland, 2012.
