= Rose Gordon =

American screenwriter

- Occupation: Screenwriter
- Spouse: Harry S. Webb (div.)
- Children: 2

Rose Gordon was an American screenwriter who wrote a number of B movies in the 1930s. She served as vice president of Reliable Pictures, which was owned by her husband, Harry S. Webb. She was sometimes credited as Harry Gordon or Homer King Gordon.

== Selected filmography ==
- Wild Horse Valley (1940)
- El Diablo Rides (1939)
- Santa Fe Bound (1936)
- The Speed Reporter (1936)
- Fast Bullets (1936)
- Texas Jack (1935)
- The Judgement Book (1935)
- The Silver Bullet (1935)
- Silent Valley (1935)
- Kentucky Blue Streak (1935)
- Born to Battle (1935)
- Tracy Rides (1935)
- Wolf Riders (1935)
- Coyote Trails (1935)
- North of Arizona (1935)
- Loser's End (1935)
- Unconquered Bandit (1935)
- Terror of the Plains (1934)
- Fighting Hero (1934)
- Rawhide Mail (1934)
- Mystery Ranch (1934)
- Ridin' Thru (1934)
