= Lost Ranch =

1937 film

- Directed by: Sam Katzman
- Written by: Basil Dickey (screenplay); Basil Dickey (story)
- Produced by: Sam Katzman (producer)
- Starring: See below
- Cinematography: William Hyer
- Edited by: Holbrook N. Todd
- Production company: Victory Pictures
- Distributed by: Victory Pictures
- Release date: 1937
- Running time: 56 minutes
- Country: United States
- Language: English

Lost Ranch is a 1937 American Western film produced and directed by Sam Katzman starring Tom Tyler.

== Plot summary ==
Rancher John Carroll disappears and the Cattlemen's Protective Association sends agents Tom Wade and Happy Baldwin to look into it.

== Cast ==
- Tom Tyler as Tom Wade
- Jeanne Martel as Rita Carroll
- Howard Bryant as Happy Baldwin
- Slim Whitaker as Sheriff
- Theodore Lorch as Charlie Merkle, Carson Henchman
- Forrest Taylor as Bart Carson
- Marjorie Beebe as Minnie - Rita's friend
- Lafe McKee as John Carroll - Rita's Father
- Roger Williams as Terry, Carson Henchman

== Soundtrack ==
- Tom Tyler - "Tucson Mary"
