= Jayne Regan =

American film actress

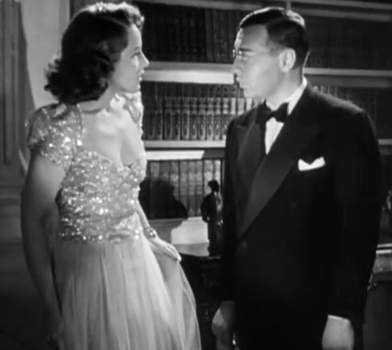
- Peter Lorre as Moto with Jayne Regan in Thank You, Mr. Moto (1937)
- Born: Bobbie Stoffregen; July 28, 1909; New York City, U.S.
- Died: March 19, 2000 (aged 90); Redlands, California, U.S.
- Other name: Bobby Stoffregen
- Education: Washington University in St. Louis
- Occupation: Actress
- Years active: 1934–1938 (film)

Bobbie Stoffregen (July 28, 1909 – March 19, 2000), known professionally as Jayne Regan, was an American film actress. Her original name was sometimes seen as Bobby Stoffregen.

== Early years ==
Regan was the daughter of Herman C. and Anna Stoffregen. From age 2 to 15, she studied dance, drama, and singing in addition to attending Mary Institute, Loretto Academy and Cleveland High School. In 1932, she graduated (another source says that she graduated in 1931) with an A. B. degree from Washington University in St. Louis, where she was a member of Phi Mu sorority.

== Career ==
After Regan met Cecil B. DeMille in Washington, D. C., she went to Hollywood. Her film debut came in Thank You, Mr. Moto.

Regan acted in Western films for Reliable Pictures while attending drama school for two years. She was under contract to Twentieth Century Fox during the 1930s.

== Personal life ==
A jury found Regan negligent and awarded the plaintiff $3,500 for personal injuries in a legal case in January 1932. He said that he was injured while driving a truck that was hit by a car driven by her. She denied being negligent.

On December 21, 1937, Regan married Jerry Gose, a production manager at Twentieth Century Fox. On June 21, 1951, the couple divorced in Hollywood.

== Partial filmography ==
- Ridin' Thru (1934) - Ranch Guest (uncredited)
- Cleopatra (1934) - Lady Vesta
- Terror of the Plains (1934) - Camp Girl (uncredited)
- The Cactus Kid (1935) - Beth
- One More Spring (1935) - Nurse (uncredited)
- The Silver Bullet (1935) - Nora Kane / Mary Kane
- Dante's Inferno (1935) - College Girl (uncredited)
- Texas Jack (1935) - Ann Hall
- Ladies in Love (1936) - Mrs. Drekon (uncredited)
- Stowaway (1936) - Dora Day
- Thin Ice (1937) - (uncredited)
- This Is My Affair (1937) - Girl with Roosevelt
- You Can't Have Everything (1937) - Stewardess (uncredited)
- Wife, Doctor and Nurse (1937) - Hostess (uncredited)
- Second Honeymoon (1937) - Paula
- Thank You, Mr. Moto (1937) - Eleanor Joyce
- Walking Down Broadway (1938) - Jerry Lane
- Mr. Moto's Gamble (1938) - Linda Benton
- Josette (1938) - Cafe Girl (uncredited)
- Always Goodbye (1938) - Fashion Salon Customer (uncredited)
- Booloo (1938) - Kate Jaye
- Keep Smiling (1938) - Leading Woman (uncredited) (final film role)

== Bibliography ==
- Pitts, Michael R. Poverty Row Studios, 1929–1940: An Illustrated History of 55 Independent Film Companies, with a Filmography for Each. McFarland & Company, 2005.
