= Brothers of the West =

1937 film

- Film poster
- Directed by: Sam Katzman
- Written by: Basil Dickey
- Produced by: Sam Katzman
- Starring: See below
- Cinematography: William Hyer
- Edited by: Holbrook N. Todd
- Production company: Victory Pictures
- Release date: 1937
- Running time: 58 minutes
- Country: United States
- Language: English

Brothers of the West is a 1937 American Western film produced and directed by Sam Katzman filmed at the Brandeis Ranch at Chatsworth, Los Angeles.

== Plot ==
In order to help pay his mortgage, Ed Wade acts as an escort to a payroll. After bandits kill Ed's employer, Ed hides the payroll before he his captured. Ed's brother Tom, a range detective of the Cattleman's Protective Association is called by Ed's wife to find him.

== Cast ==
- Tom Tyler as Tom Wade
- Lois Wilde as Celia Chandler
- Dorothy Short as Annie Wade, Ed's Wife
- Lafe McKee as Sheriff Bains
- Bob Terry as Ed Wade, Tom's Brother
- Dave O'Brien as Bart, Tracy Henchman
- Roger Williams as Jeff Tracy, Attorney
- Jim Corey as Larry, Tracy Henchman
- James C. Morton as Cattle Man's Protective Assoc. Chief
- Jack "Tiny" Lipson as Jake the Hobo
