= Texas Renegades (film) =

- Theatrical release poster
- Directed by: Sam Newfield
- Screenplay by: Joseph O'Donnell
- Story by: Robert Emmett Tansey
- Produced by: Sigmund Neufeld
- Starring: Tim McCoy; Nora Lane; Kenne Duncan; Lee Prather; Harry Harvey Sr. Earl Gunn
- Cinematography: Jack Greenhalgh
- Edited by: Holbrook N. Todd
- Production company: Sigmund Neufeld Productions
- Distributed by: Producers Releasing Corporation
- Release date: January 17, 1940
- Running time: 59 minutes
- Country: United States
- Language: English

Texas Renegades is a 1940 American Western film directed by Sam Newfield and written by Joseph O'Donnell. The film stars Tim McCoy, Nora Lane, Kenne Duncan, Lee Prather, Harry Harvey Sr. and Earl Gunn. The film was released on January 17, 1940, by Producers Releasing Corporation.

== Plot ==
A new Marshall arrives in Rawhide. His name is Tim Smith, and his mission is to fight off some rustlers. The gang attempts for his life, but gets the wrong guy, Tim takes advantage of this situation to pose as an outlaw and make his way inside the gang. When the gang trusts him, they give him the job of posing as a Marshall.

== Cast ==
- Tim McCoy as 'Silent' Tim Smith
- Nora Lane as Ruth Rand
- Kenne Duncan as Bill Willis
- Lee Prather as Jim Bates
- Harry Harvey Sr. as Noisy
- Earl Gunn as Lefty Higgins
- Hal Price as Mr. Lee
- Bud McClure as Tom
- Joe McGuinn as Jeff
- Ray Bennett as Snipe
- Buel Bryant as Murph
- Arnold Clack as Lucky
