= Silent Valley (1935 film) =

1935 film directed by Bernard B. Ray

- Directed by: Bernard B. Ray
- Written by: Rose Gordon; Jean George; Carl Krusada
- Produced by: Bernard B. Ray; Harry S. Webb
- Starring: Tom Tyler; Al Bridge; Nancy Deshon
- Cinematography: J. Henry Kruse
- Edited by: Fred Bain
- Production company: Reliable Pictures
- Distributed by: Reliable Pictures
- Release date: May 2, 1935
- Running time: 60 minutes
- Country: United States
- Language: English

Silent Valley is a 1935 American Western film directed by Bernard B. Ray and starring Tom Tyler, Al Bridge and Nancy Deshon.

== Cast ==
- Tom Tyler as Sheriff Tom Hall
- Al Bridge as Jim Farley
- Nancy Deshon as Helen Jones
- Hal Taliaferro as Fred Jones
- Charles King as Henchman Harry Keller
- Slim Whitaker as Pete Childers, aka Peterson
- Art Miles as Deputy George Hull
- Murdock MacQuarrie as Rancher Barnes

== Bibliography ==
- Pitts, Michael R. Poverty Row Studios, 1929–1940: An Illustrated History of 55 Independent Film Companies, with a Filmography for Each. McFarland & Company, 2005.
