= Feud of the Trail =

1937 film

- Directed by: Robert F. Hill
- Produced by: Sam Katzman
- Starring: Tom Tyler
- Production company: Victory Pictures Corporation
- Release date: 1937
- Running time: 56 minutes
- Country: United States
- Language: English

Feud of the Trail is a 1937 American Western film starring Tom Tyler.

It is the fourth in a series of Westerns Tyler made for Sam Katzman's Victory Productions. Tyler has a dual role, playing the hero and a villainous look-alike. It was shot at the Lazy A Ranch at Chatsworth, California.
