= Mystery Ranch (1934 film) =

1934 film

- Original film poster
- Directed by: Bernard B. Ray
- Written by: Rose Gordon; William L. Nolte (as J.K. Henry); Carl Krusada
- Produced by: Bernard B. Ray; Harry S. Webb
- Starring: Tom Tyler; Roberta Gale; Jack Perrin
- Cinematography: J. Henry Kruse
- Edited by: Fred Bain
- Production company: Reliable Pictures
- Distributed by: Reliable Pictures
- Release date: April 12, 1934
- Running time: 56 minutes
- Country: United States
- Language: English

Mystery Ranch is a 1934 American comedy Western film co-produced and directed by Bernard B. Ray and starring Tom Tyler, Roberta Gale and Jack Perrin. It was Tyler's first of 18 films for Reliable Pictures.

== Plot ==
Pulp Western writer Bob Morris is invited to a dude ranch whose owner Mrs. Henderson promises will feature the "real" dangerous Wild West. In reality Mrs. Henderson arranges a variety of fake lynchings, cattle rustling and dangerous situations to frighten Mr. Morris and gain publicity for her ranch. The joke backfires because Morris is a skilled horseman and expert fighter who impresses Mrs. Henderson and her daughter Mary.

Morris and his secretary Percy Jenkins view an automobile hold up that they believe is another of Mrs. Henderson's tricks. In reality it is an actual holdup of gold bullion with the robbers coming to Mrs. Henderson's ranch.

== Cast ==
- Tom Tyler as Bob Morris
- Roberta Gale as Mary Henderson
- Louise Cabo as Mrs. Henderson
- Jack Perrin(billed as Jack Gable) as George Andrews
- Frank Hall Crane as Percy Jenkins
- Charles King as Sam
- Tom London as Holdup Man
- George Chesebro as Holdup Man
- Lafe McKee as Sheriff

== Bibliography ==
- Pitts, Michael R. Poverty Row Studios, 1929–1940: An Illustrated History of 55 Independent Film Companies, with a Filmography for Each. McFarland & Company, 2005.
