= Texas Jack (film) =

1935 film directed by Bernard B. Ray

- Directed by: Bernard B. Ray
- Written by: Rose Gordon; Carl Krusada
- Produced by: Bernard B. Ray; Harry S. Webb
- Starring: Jack Perrin; Jayne Regan; Nelson McDowell
- Cinematography: J. Henry Kruse
- Edited by: Fred Bain
- Production company: Reliable Pictures
- Distributed by: Reliable Pictures
- Release date: December 15, 1935
- Running time: 55 minutes
- Country: United States
- Language: English

Texas Jack is a 1935 American Western film directed by Bernard B. Ray and starring Jack Perrin, Jayne Regan and Nelson McDowell.

== Cast ==
- Jack Perrin as Texas Jack Carrol
- Jayne Regan as Ann Hall
- Nelson McDowell as Barney
- Robert D. Walker as Dan Corey, aka Andrew Cole
- Cope Borden as Skinny, the boy
- Lew Meehan as Henchman Biff Jones
- Blackie Whiteford as Henchman Cal
- Budd Buster as Chief Kickapoo
- Oscar Gahan as Tuck, A Minstrel
- Jim Oates as Nip, A Minstrel

== Bibliography ==
- Pitts, Michael R. Poverty Row Studios, 1929–1940: An Illustrated History of 55 Independent Film Companies, with a Filmography for Each. McFarland & Company, 2005.
