= Roberta Gale =

American actress

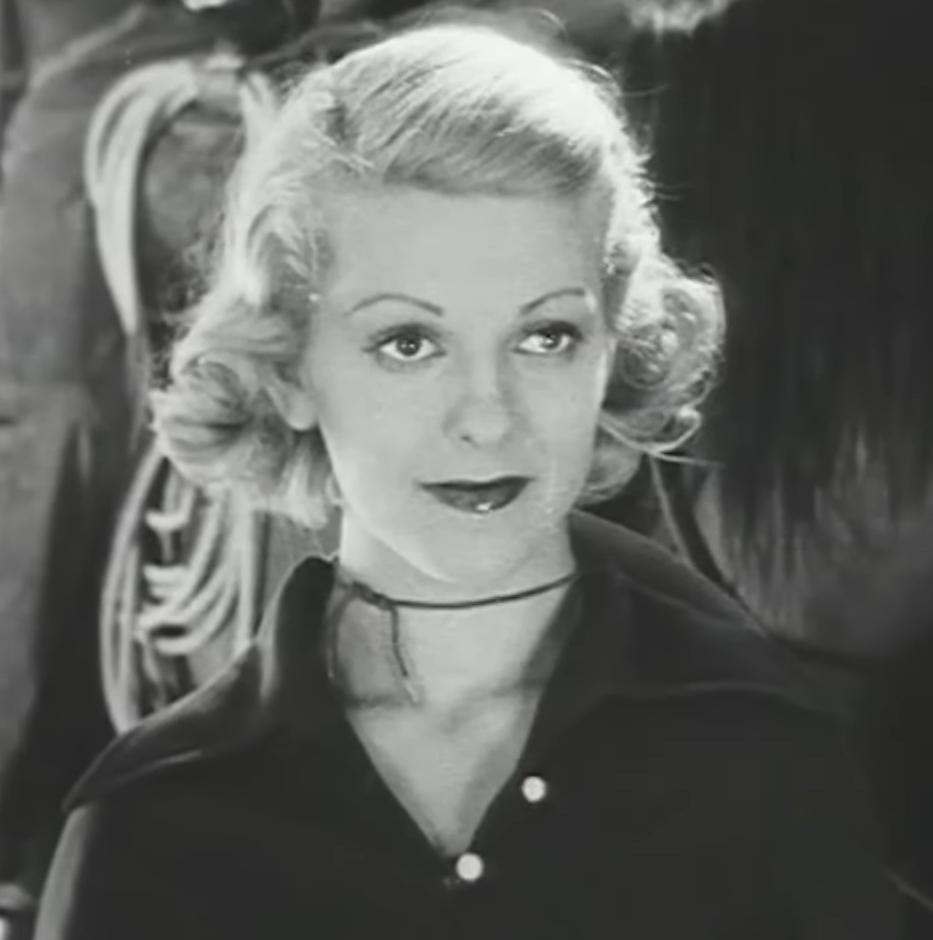
- Gale in No Man's Range (1935)
- Born: October 18, 1914; Pittsburgh, Pennsylvania, U.S.
- Died: January 29, 2008 (aged 93); Los Angeles, California, U. S.
- Occupation: Actress
- Years active: 1930-1935 (film)
- Spouse: S. Mark Taper

Roberta Gale (October 18, 1914 – January 29, 2008) was an American actress. She is known for her roles as a leading lady in a number of Poverty Row western films made during the 1930s.

The daughter of J.M. Gale and Blanche Harris Gale, she was born in Pittsburgh, Pennsylvania, and raised in Miami, Florida. She appeared on Broadway in The New Yorkers (1927).

In Hollywood at age 15, Gale was described as "a Clara Bow type".

Gale married Mark Taper, philanthropist and financier in Los Angeles in 1962; the marriage lasted eight months.

== Selected filmography ==
- Are These Our Children (1931)
- The Public Defender (1931)
- Girl of the Rio (1932)
- Her Splendid Folly (1933)
- Police Call (1933)
- Mystery Ranch (1934)
- Terror of the Plains (1934)
- St. Louis Woman (1934)
- Cheers of the Crowd (1935)
- Alias John Law (1935)
- No Man's Range (1935)
- Fighting Youth (1935)

== Bibliography ==
- Pitts, Michael R. Poverty Row Studios, 1929–1940: An Illustrated History of 55 Independent Film Companies, with a Filmography for Each. McFarland & Company, 2005.
