= Coyote Trails =

1935 film

- Original film poster
- Directed by: Bernard B. Ray
- Written by: Carl Krusada (story); Rose Gordon (screenplay)
- Produced by: Bernard B. Ray (producer)
- Starring: See below
- Cinematography: J. Henry Kruse
- Edited by: Frederick Bain
- Production company: Reliable Pictures
- Release date: 1935
- Running time: 60 minutes
- Country: United States
- Language: English

Coyote Trails is a 1935 American Western film produced and directed by Bernard B. Ray starring Tom Tyler. There are no coyotes or their trails featured in the film.

== Plot ==
A ranch is having their horses disappear with it believed that a wild white stallion called "The Phantom" is luring them away. In reality The Phantom is being used by rustlers in cahoots with the ranch's foreman.

== Cast ==
- Tom Tyler as Tom Riley
- Ben Corbett as Sidekick Windy
- Alice Dahl as Helen Baker
- Lafe McKee as John Baker
- Richard Alexander as Mack Larkin
- Slim Whitaker as Bert
- George Chesebro as Henchman Jim
