= Her Splendid Folly =

1933 film

- Directed by: William A. O'Connor
- Written by: Willis Kent
- Based on: Her Splendid Folly by Beulah Poynter
- Produced by: Willis Kent
- Starring: Lilian Bond; Theodore von Eltz; Beryl Mercer
- Cinematography: Jules Cronjager; James Diamond
- Edited by: S. Roy Luby
- Music by: Lee Zahler
- Production company: Willis Kent Productions
- Distributed by: Progressive Pictures
- Release date: January 28, 1933
- Running time: 60 minutes
- Country: United States
- Language: English

Her Splendid Folly is a 1933 American comedy drama film directed by William A. O'Connor and starring Lilian Bond, Theodore von Eltz and Beryl Mercer. It was produced as a second feature by the independent producer Willis Kent.

== Plot ==
Jill McAllister is behind on her rent, and takes a job at a film studio as a double for diva-like film star Laura Gerrard whom she strongly resembles. When Laura is badly injured in a car accident, studio head Solomon Ginsberg persuades Jill to take over her role.

== Cast ==
- Lilian Bond as Jill McAllister / Laura Gerard
- Theodore von Eltz as Wallace Morley / John Ebbetts
- Alexander Carr as Solomon Ginsberg
- Beryl Mercer as Mrs. McAllister
- J. Frank Glendon as Charles Hemingway
- Lloyd Whitlock as John DeSylva
- Roberta Gale as Sally Lee
- Frances Lee as Natalie
- Louise Beavers as Anastasia
- William P. Burt as Justice of the Peace
- Harry Todd as Witness
- Mary Gordon as Mrs. Clancey

== Bibliography ==
- Fetrow, Alan G. Sound films, 1927-1939: a United States Filmography. McFarland, 1992.
- Pitts, Michael R. Poverty Row Studios, 1929–1940: An Illustrated History of 55 Independent Film Companies, with a Filmography for Each. McFarland & Company, 2005.
