= One Hysterical Night =

1929 film

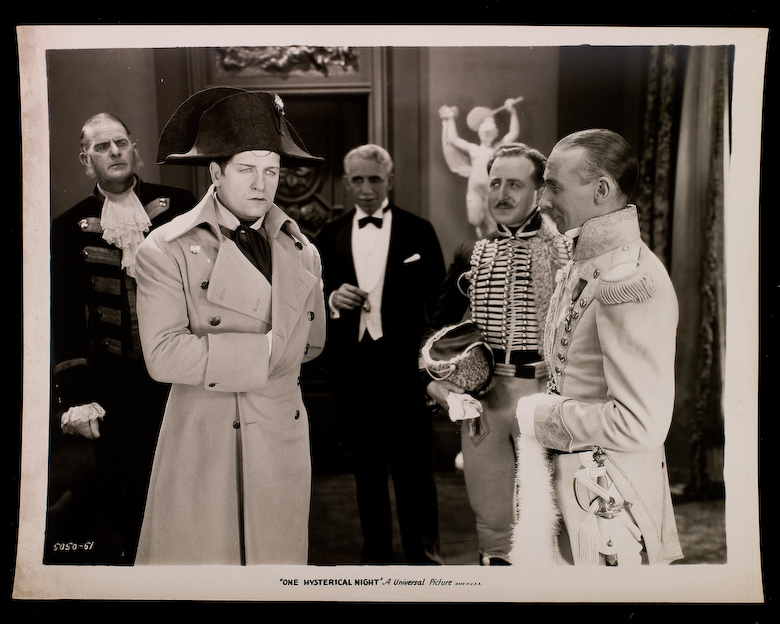
- Directed by: William James Craft
- Written by: Reginald Denny (story & scenario); Earle Snell
- Produced by: Carl Laemmle
- Starring: Reginald Denny
- Cinematography: Arthur L. Todd
- Edited by: Milton Carruth
- Distributed by: Universal Pictures
- Release date: October 6, 1929
- Running time: 75 minutes
- Country: United States
- Language: English

One Hysterical Night is a 1929 American pre-Code comedy film directed by William James Craft and starring Reginald Denny, Nora Lane, Walter Brennan and Peter Gawthorne.

== Plot summary ==
A wealthy man dresses up as Napoleon for a fancy dress ball, but is instead detained in a lunatic asylum where they suspect him of having delusions of grandeur.

== Cast ==
- Reginald Denny as William 'Napoleon' Judd
- Nora Lane as Nurse Josephine
- E. J. Ratcliffe as Wellington
- Fritz Feld as Paganini
- Slim Summerville as Robin Hood
- Joyzelle Joyner as Salome
- Jules Cowles as William Tell
- Walter Brennan as Paul Revere
- Henry Otto as Doctor Hayden
- Margaret Campbell as Mrs Bixby
- Peter Gawthorne as Mr Bixby
- Rolfe Sedan as Arthur Bixby

== See also ==
- List of early sound feature films (1926–1929)
