= The Silver Bullet (1935 film) =

1935 film directed by Bernard B. Ray

- Directed by: Bernard B. Ray
- Written by: Rose Gordon; William L. Nolte; Carl Krusada
- Produced by: Bernard B. Ray; Harry S. Webb
- Starring: Tom Tyler; Jayne Regan; Lafe McKee
- Cinematography: J. Henry Kruse
- Edited by: Fred Bain
- Production company: Reliable Pictures
- Distributed by: Reliable Pictures
- Release date: May 11, 1935
- Running time: 58 minutes
- Country: United States
- Language: English

The Silver Bullet is a 1935 American Western film directed by Bernard B. Ray and starring Tom Tyler, Jayne Regan and Lafe McKee.

== Cast ==
- Tom Tyler as Tom Henderson
- Jayne Regan as Nora Kane / Mary Kane
- Lafe McKee as Dad Kane
- Charles King as Luke Hargrave
- George Chesebro as Slim Walker
- Slim Whitaker as Scurvy
- Lew Meehan as Pete
- Franklyn Farnum as Marshal Joe Mullane
- Hal Taliaferro as Deputy Dick

== Bibliography ==
- Pitts, Michael R. Poverty Row Studios, 1929–1940: An Illustrated History of 55 Independent Film Companies, with a Filmography for Each. McFarland & Company, 2005.
