= Sons of New Mexico =

1949 film by John English

- Directed by: John English
- Written by: Paul Gangelin
- Produced by: Armand Schaefer
- Starring: Gene Autry; Gail Davis; Robert Armstrong; Dick Jones; Frankie Darro; Irving Bacon
- Cinematography: William Bradford
- Edited by: Henry Batista
- Production company: Gene Autry Productions
- Distributed by: Columbia Pictures
- Release date: December 20, 1949
- Running time: 71 minutes
- Country: United States
- Language: English

Sons of New Mexico is a 1949 American Western film directed by John English and written by Paul Gangelin. The film stars Gene Autry, Gail Davis, Robert Armstrong, Dick Jones, Frankie Darro and Irving Bacon. The film was released on December 20, 1949, by Columbia Pictures.

== Cast ==
- Gene Autry as Gene Autry
- Gail Davis as Eileen MacDonald
- Robert Armstrong as Pat Feeney
- Dick Jones as Randy Pryor
- Frankie Darro as Gig Jackson
- Irving Bacon as Chris Dobbs
- Russell Arms as Chuck Brunton
- Marie Blake as Hannah Dobbs
- Clayton Moore as Rufe Burns
- Sandy Sanders as Walt
- Roy Gordon as Major Hynes
- Frank Marvin as Joe
- Paul Raymond as Brad
- Pierce Lyden as Watson
- Kenne Duncan as Ed
- Champion as Champ
