= The Outlaw Deputy =

1935 film

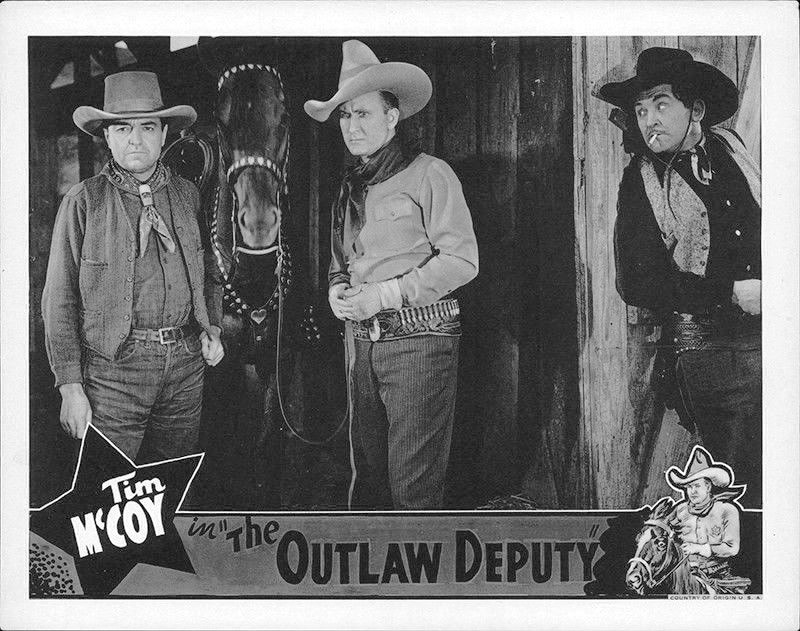
- Directed by: Otto Brower
- Starring: Tim McCoy, Nora Lane, and Hooper Atchley
- Release date: 1935
- Running time: 59 minutes
- Country: United States
- Language: English

The Outlaw Deputy is a 1935 American Western film, directed by Otto Brower. It stars Tim McCoy, Nora Lane, and Hooper Atchley.
