= Tracy Rides =

1935 film

- Directed by: Harry S. Webb
- Written by: Norman Hughes; Betty Burbridge; Rose Gordon
- Produced by: Bernard B. Ray; Harry S. Webb
- Starring: Tom Tyler; Virginia Brown Faire; Edmund Cobb
- Cinematography: J. Henry Kruse
- Edited by: Fred Bain
- Production company: Reliable Pictures
- Distributed by: Reliable Pictures
- Release date: February 26, 1935
- Running time: 60 minutes
- Country: United States
- Language: English

Tracy Rides is a 1935 American Western film directed by Harry S. Webb and starring Tom Tyler, Virginia Brown Faire and Edmund Cobb.

== Cast ==
- Tom Tyler as Sheriff Tom Tracy
- Virginia Brown Faire as Molly Hampton
- Edmund Cobb as Ned Hampton
- Charles K. French as John Hampton
- Carol Shandrew as Judy Green
- Lafe McKee as Jim Green
- Jimmy Aubrey as Sandy, the Cook

== Bibliography ==
- Pitts, Michael R. Poverty Row Studios, 1929–1940: An Illustrated History of 55 Independent Film Companies, with a Filmography for Each. McFarland & Company, 2005.
