= The Cheyenne Kid =

1933 film

- Theatrical release poster
- Directed by: Robert F. Hill
- Screenplay by: Jack Curtis
- Based on: Sir Piegan Passes by W.C. Tuttle
- Produced by: David O. Selznick
- Starring: Tom Keene; Mary Mason; Roscoe Ates; Otto Hoffman; Al Bridge
- Cinematography: Nicholas Musuraca
- Edited by: Arthur Roberts
- Music by: Max Steiner
- Production company: RKO Pictures
- Distributed by: RKO Pictures
- Release date: January 20, 1933
- Running time: 54 minutes
- Country: United States
- Language: English

The Cheyenne Kid is a 1933 American Pre-Code Western film directed by Robert F. Hill and written by Jack Curtis. The film stars Tom Keene, Mary Mason, Roscoe Ates, Otto Hoffman and Al Bridge. The film was released on January 20, 1933, by RKO Pictures.

== Plot ==
Chasing a gambler that stole money, Tom Larkin gets his horse shot out from under him. Meeting an outlaw with a horse, after a fight Tom rides away on that horse. Arriving in town he is mistaken for the outlaw and offered a job of killing a man. But the man is the father of the girl that Tom's money was to go to but was stolen by the gambler.

== Cast ==
- Tom Keene as Tom Larkin
- Mary Mason as Hope
- Roscoe Ates as Bush
- Otto Hoffman as Winters
- Al Bridge as Denver
- Alan Roscoe as Hollister
- Anderson Lawler as Tate

== Production ==
It was the second Tom Keene western produced by David Lewis.
