= The Man from Thunder River =

1943 film by John English

- Theatrical release poster
- Directed by: John English
- Screenplay by: J. Benton Cheney
- Produced by: Harry Grey
- Starring: Wild Bill Elliott; George "Gabby" Hayes; Anne Jeffreys; Ian Keith; John James; Georgie Cooper
- Cinematography: Bud Thackery
- Edited by: Harry Keller
- Music by: Mort Glickman
- Production company: Republic Pictures
- Distributed by: Republic Pictures
- Release date: June 11, 1943
- Running time: 57 minutes
- Country: United States
- Language: English

The Man from Thunder River is a 1943 American Western film directed by John English and written by J. Benton Cheney. The film stars Wild Bill Elliott, George "Gabby" Hayes, Anne Jeffreys, Ian Keith, John James and Georgie Cooper. The film was released on June 11, 1943, by Republic Pictures.

== Cast ==
- Wild Bill Elliott as Wild Bill Elliott
- George "Gabby" Hayes as Gabby Whittaker
- Anne Jeffreys as Nancy Ferguson
- Ian Keith as Henry Stevens
- John James as Jack Ferguson
- Georgie Cooper as Bess Ferguson
- Jack Ingram as Les
- Eddie Lee as Wong
- Charles King as Henchman
- Jack Rockwell as Sheriff
