= Nora Lane =

American actress (1905–1938)

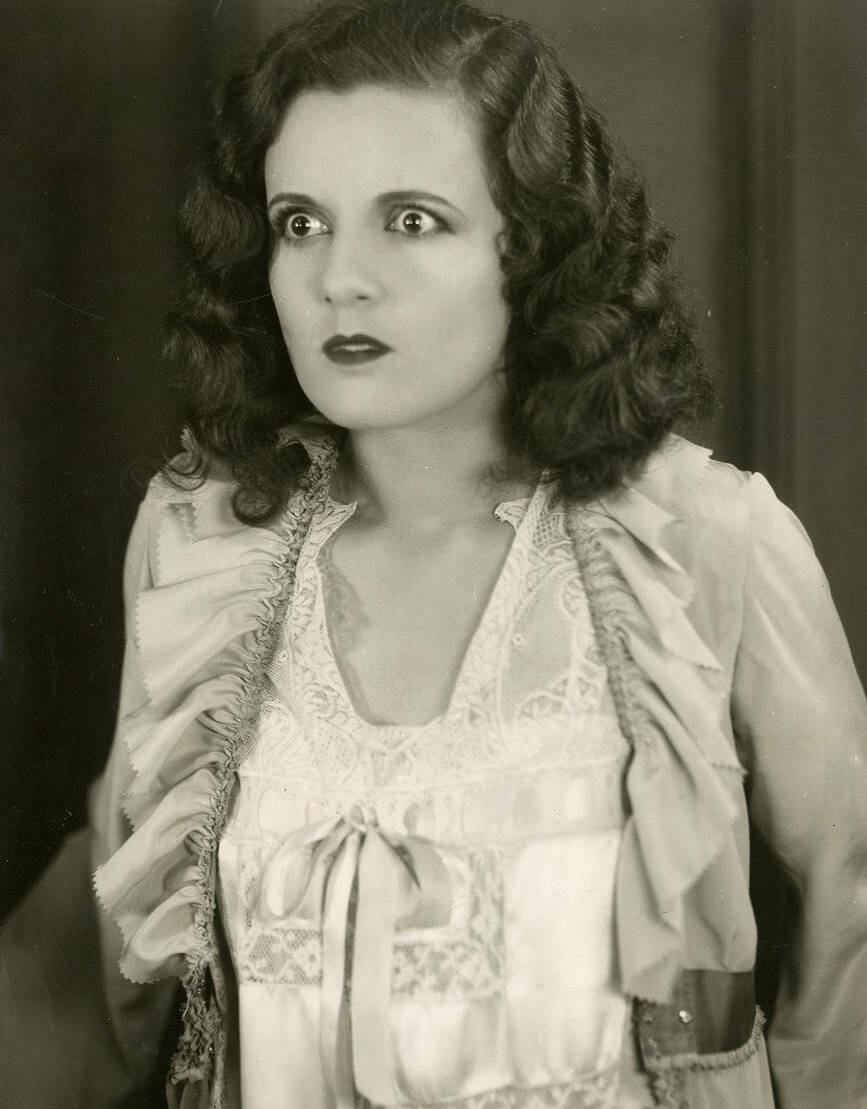
- Lane in 1928
- Born: September 12, 1905; Chester, Illinois, U.S.
- Died: October 16, 1948 (aged 43); Glendale, California, U.S.
- Resting place: Forest Lawn Memorial Park, Glendale
- Occupation: Actress
- Years active: 1927–1944
- Spouse: Burdette Henney (1941-1948) (his death)
- Children: 2

Nora Lane (September 12, 1905 – October 16, 1948) was an American film actress. She appeared in more than 80 films between 1927 and 1944.

Lane was born in Chester, Illinois. She and her family moved to St. Louis when she was 10 years old. She attended schools there and worked there as a model in women's clothing shops. During a visit to Hollywood in 1925, meeting a casting director led to a screen test for her. The test resulted in work as an extra in films, then a bit part in Paris and a small part in Upstage. Her first lead role was in Arizona Nights.

She committed suicide in 1948, one month after her husband died from a heart attack. She was 43.

== Selected filmography ==
- Jesse James (1927)
- Arizona Nights (1927)
- The Flying U Ranch (1927)
- The Pioneer Scout (1928)
- A Night of Mystery (1928)
- The Gun Runner (1928)
- The Texas Tornado (1928)
- Kit Carson (1928)
- Sally (1929)
- One Hysterical Night (1929)
- Sunset Pass (1929)
- Masked Emotions (1929)
- The Cohens and the Kellys in Atlantic City (1929)
- The Man Hunter (1930)
- Rain or Shine (1930)
- King of the Wild (1931) serial
- Young Sinners (1931)
- The Cisco Kid (1931)
- Disorderly Conduct (1932)
- The Western Code (1932)
- Careless Lady (1932)
- This Sporting Age (1932)
- Jimmy the Gent (1934)
- The Outlaw Deputy (1935)
- Borderland (1937)
- Hopalong Rides Again (1937)
- Cassidy of Bar 20 (1938)
- Six-Gun Trail (1938)
- City of Chance (1940)
- Texas Renegades (1940)
- Undercover Man (1942)
- Lake Placid Serenade (1944)
