= Partners of the Trail (1931 film) =

1931 film

- Directed by: Wallace Fox
- Written by: George Arthur Durlam; Will Beale
- Produced by: Trem Carr
- Starring: Tom Tyler; Betty Mack; Lafe McKee
- Cinematography: Archie Stout
- Edited by: Fred Bain
- Production company: Trem Carr Pictures
- Distributed by: Monogram Pictures
- Release date: July 22, 1931
- Running time: 63 minutes
- Country: United States
- Language: English

Partners of the Trail is a 1931 American Western film directed by Wallace Fox and starring Tom Tyler, Betty Mack and Lafe McKee.

== Cast ==
- Tom Tyler as Larry Condon
- Betty Mack as Ruby Gerard
- Lafe McKee as Sheriff McWade
- Reginald Sheffield as John Durant
- Horace B. Carpenter as Skeets Briggs
- Patrick Rooney as Burke
- Marguerite McWade as Mary Lopez

== Bibliography ==
- Pitts, Michael R. Western Movies: A Guide to 5,105 Feature Films. McFarland, 2012.
