= Jimmie Dodd =

American actor (1910–1964)

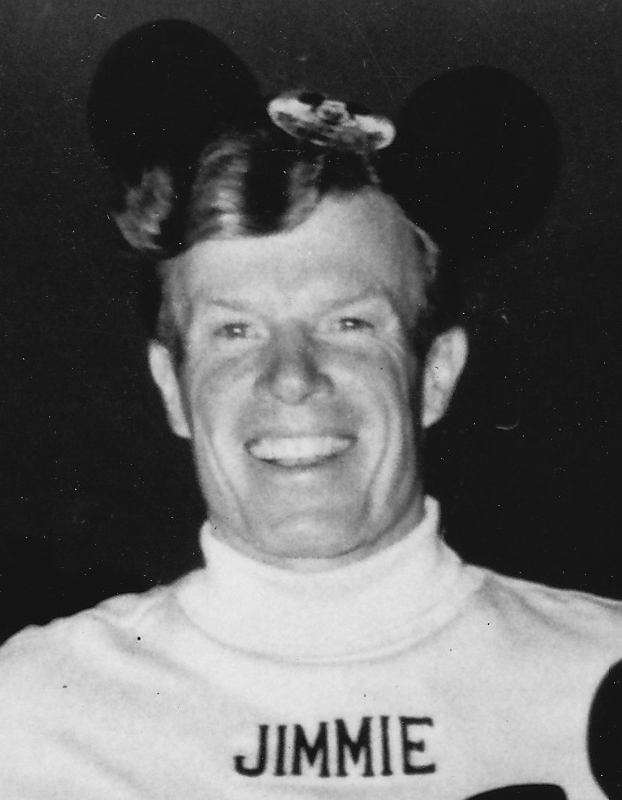
- Dodd as a Mouseketeer on The Mickey Mouse Club, circa 1956
- Born: James Wesley Dodd; March 28, 1910; Cincinnati, Ohio, U.S.
- Died: November 10, 1964 (aged 54); Honolulu, Hawaii, U.S.
- Occupations: Actor, singer-songwriter
- Years active: 1937–1959
- Spouse: Ruth Carrell (m. 1940)

James Wesley Dodd (March 28, 1910 – November 10, 1964) was an American actor, singer, and songwriter best known as the master of ceremonies for the popular 1950s Walt Disney television series The Mickey Mouse Club, as well as the writer of its well-known theme song, "The Mickey Mouse Club March". A different version of this march, much slower in tempo and with different lyrics, became the alma mater that closed each episode.

== Early life ==
Dodd was born and grew up in Cincinnati. where he was an outstanding amateur tennis player, reaching the round of 16 twice at his hometown tournament, now known as the Cincinnati Open. Later, a heart ailment made him ineligible to serve in combat in World War II, but he and his wife Ruth traveled extensively, entertaining the troops.

== Career ==
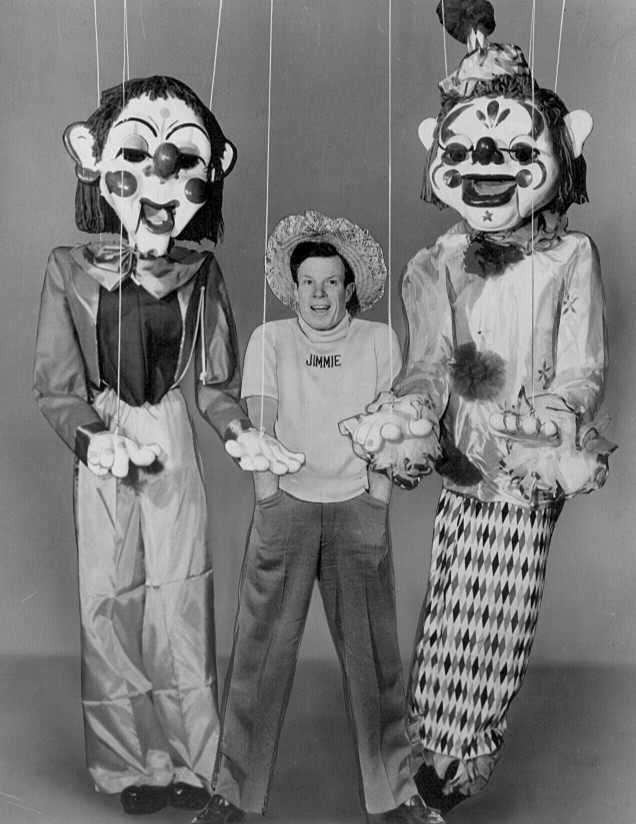
In 1956, Dodd was the television host for the Hudson's Thanksgiving parade.

Dodd moved from Cincinnati to Florida, where he worked in radio before moving to California to become a songwriter. Of the estimated 400 songs he wrote, his best-known are "Amarillo", "He Was There", "I Love Girls", "Nashville Blues", and "Rosemary", though not all were published.

=== Films ===
Dodd had some early film roles in The Three Mesquiteers series of Westerns. Coincidentally, he performed in two unrelated series whose titles were plays on "musketeers". He made his first screen appearance in the 1940 William Holden film Those Were the Days! in a minor role. He was one of the standout singers in the song, "Who’s Your Yehouti" in the 1940 movie Varsity Vanities. He also appeared in many theatrical films in the 1940s and 1950s, often uncredited. He appeared with John Wayne in the war films Flying Tigers (1942), Janie (1944), in which he sings a bit of "Keep Your Powder Dry" with star Joyce Reynolds, and with Harry Carey in China's Little Devils (1945), another film involving the Flying Tigers. He also played the taxi driver in the MGM film Easter Parade (1948), starring Fred Astaire and Judy Garland. 1948 also saw him appear as the doorman in Donald O'Connor's "Are You With It?" Dodd had a small, but important part in the Mickey Rooney hit Quicksand (1950). Two of his films were biographies of baseball players: The Jackie Robinson Story (1950), in which Jackie Robinson played himself, and The Winning Team (1952), in which future president Ronald Reagan portrayed pitcher Grover Cleveland Alexander. He played a taxi driver again in Phffft (1954).

=== Television other than The Mickey Mouse Club ===
In addition to his small role in an early episode of Adventures of Superman titled "Double Trouble", Dodd appeared as a deputy in the 1955 episode "Sontag and Evans" of the syndicated television series Stories of the Century. The segment was based on the California train robbers Chris Evans and John Sontag.

=== The Mickey Mouse Club ===
Dodd came to the attention of Walt Disney after submitting a song for the show. Disney was impressed by Dodd's outgoing personality and rapport with the younger members of the cast and signed him to a seven-year contract.

The Mickey Mouse Club aired each weekday. Dodd always wore "Mouseke-ears", played his "Mouse-guitar", and sang self-composed songs. His tunes contained positive messages for kids. Among his other musical contributions is a song that a generation of kids used for nearly a half-century to spell "encyclopedia". He performed a regular segment on the show singing "Proverbs, proverbs, they're so true"... and would then expound on a proverb from the Bible and give an explanation of its value in everyday life. He wrote some themes for Zorro and performed songs in several of his movies. He also wrote "Lonely Guitar", a Billboard Top 50 charted hit for fellow Mouseketeer Annette Funicello in 1959. The original Mouseketeers, frequent guests at the Dodd home for backyard barbecues and sing-alongs, said Dodd treated them as part of his own extended family. John Updike's novel Rabbit, Run makes reference to Dodd and his appearance on a Mickey Mouse Club episode.

== Death ==
Dodd died of a staphylococcal infection at age 54 on November 10, 1964, in Honolulu. He is interred at Forest Lawn Memorial Park in the Hollywood Hills of Los Angeles. He was survived by his wife, Ruth.
