= Sweetheart of the Navy =

1937 film

- Directed by: W. Duncan Mansfield
- Screenplay by: Carroll Graham
- Story by: Garrett Graham; Jay Strauss
- Produced by: B. F. Zeidman
- Starring: Eric Linden; Cecilia Parker; Roger Imhof; Bernadene Hayes; Don Barclay; Etta McDaniel
- Cinematography: Edward Snyder
- Edited by: Edward Schroeder
- Production company: B. F. Ziedman Film
- Distributed by: Grand National Films Inc.
- Release date: June 8, 1937
- Running time: 61 minutes
- Country: United States
- Language: English

Sweetheart of the Navy is a 1937 American comedy film directed by W. Duncan Mansfield and written by Carroll Graham. The film stars Eric Linden, Cecilia Parker, Roger Imhof, Bernadene Hayes, Don Barclay and Etta McDaniel. The film was released on June 8, 1937, by Grand National Films Inc.

== Plot ==
A singer wants to make her naval port nightclub a success after being left with bills.

== Cast ==
- Eric Linden as Eddie Harris
- Cecilia Parker as Joan Whitney
- Roger Imhof as Commander Lodge
- Bernadene Hayes as Mazie
- Don Barclay as Pete
- Etta McDaniel as Lily
- Reed Howes as Andrews
- Eddy Waller as Krump
- Jason Robards Sr. as Bumper
- Cully Richards as Andy
- John T. Murray as Carson
- Art Miles as Jack
- Henry Roquemore as Jones
- Fred Murray as Henry
- Vance Carroll as Steve
- Benny Burt as Fitch
