= Along Came Love =

Along Came Love may refer to:

- Along Came Love (1936 film), an American drama film directed by Bert Lytell
- Along Came Love (2023 film), a French drama film directed by Katell Quillévéré
