= Helen Flint =

American actress (1898–1967)

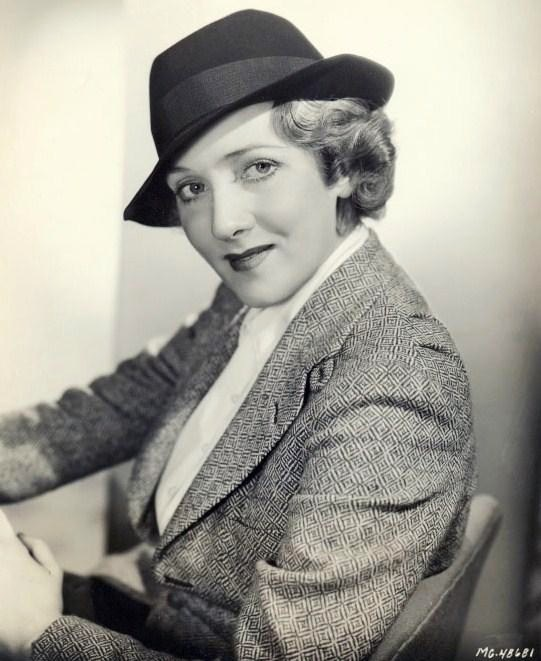
- Flint in Ah, Wilderness!
- Born: June 14, 1898; Chicago, Illinois, U.S.
- Died: September 9, 1967 (aged 69); Georgetown University Hospital Washington, D.C., U.S.
- Occupations: Actress, artists' model
- Years active: 1921–1944
- Spouse: Harmon Spencer Auguste (1938–1939, divorced)

Helen Flint (June 14, 1898 – September 9, 1967) was an American actress.

== Early life and career ==
Born in Chicago, Flint was the daughter of Mary Eva Black and attorney Alexander Flint, and the niece of popular stage actress Dorothy Dorr. It was Dorr's career that first inspired her niece to pursue acting and she later facilitated Flint's efforts to find work on Broadway.

Flint debuted as a member of the chorus in the Ziegfeld Follies when she was 17. Her Broadway resume included more than 20 productions between 1921 and 1946. She also worked as a model, posing for such artists as James Montgomery Flagg and Arthur William Brown.

Flint appeared in more than 20 films from 1931 to 1944, often portraying seedy or sexually available women. Her films included Ah, Wilderness! and Black Legion. She portrayed the fortune-hunting actress Minna Tipton in David O. Selznick's production of Little Lord Fauntleroy.

Flint's career ended with an acting appearance in the comedy The Dancer (1953) in New York.

== Personal life and death ==
Banker H. Spencer Auguste married Flint on January 27, 1938 in Palm Beach, Florida. They were divorced in Reno, Nevada, on January 7, 1939.

In 1954, en route from New York to Palm Springs, Florida and a planned new home purchase, Flint's plans were abruptly overhauled by what was meant to be a brief stopover in the Georgetown district of Washington, D.C. A Georgetown resident for the remainder of her life, Flint eventually purchased four residential buildings containing four units each, becoming what, by 1958, The Washington Sunday Star would dub a "unique landlady" and "house mother" to tenants whose apartments were characterized above all by "homeyness."

On September 9, 1967, Flint died in Georgetown University Hospital after being hit by a motorist. She was sixty-nine.

== Filmography ==
| Year | Title | Role | Notes |
|---|---|---|---|
| 1931 | The Clyde Mystery | Ann Clyde | short |
| 1934 | The Ninth Guest | Sylvia Inglesby | |
| 1934 | Midnight | Ethel Saxton | |
| 1934 | Manhattan Love Song | Carol Stewart | |
| 1934 | Handy Andy | Mrs. Beauregard | |
| 1934 | Broadway Bill | Mrs. Henry Early | uncredited |
| 1935 | Devil Dogs of the Air | Mrs. Brown | scenes deleted |
| 1935 | While the Patient Slept | Isobel Federie | |
| 1935 | Doubting Thomas | Nelly Fell | |
| 1935 | Ah, Wilderness! | Belle | |
| 1936 | Riffraff | Sadie | |
| 1936 | Little Lord Fauntleroy | Minna | |
| 1936 | Early to Bed | Mrs. Duvall | |
| 1936 | Fury | Franchette | |
| 1936 | A Son Comes Home | Belle | uncredited |
| 1936 | Give Me Your Heart | Dr. Florence Cudahy | |
| 1937 | Black Legion | Pearl Danvers | |
| 1937 | Sea Devils | Sadie Bennett | |
| 1937 | Step Lively, Jeeves! | Babe | |
| 1937 | Married Before Breakfast | Miss Fleeter | |
| 1937 | Blonde Trouble | Lucille Sears | |
| 1942 | Time to Kill | Marge | uncredited |
| 1944 | Gaslight | Franchette | uncredited |
