= Ah, Wilderness! (film) =

1935 film

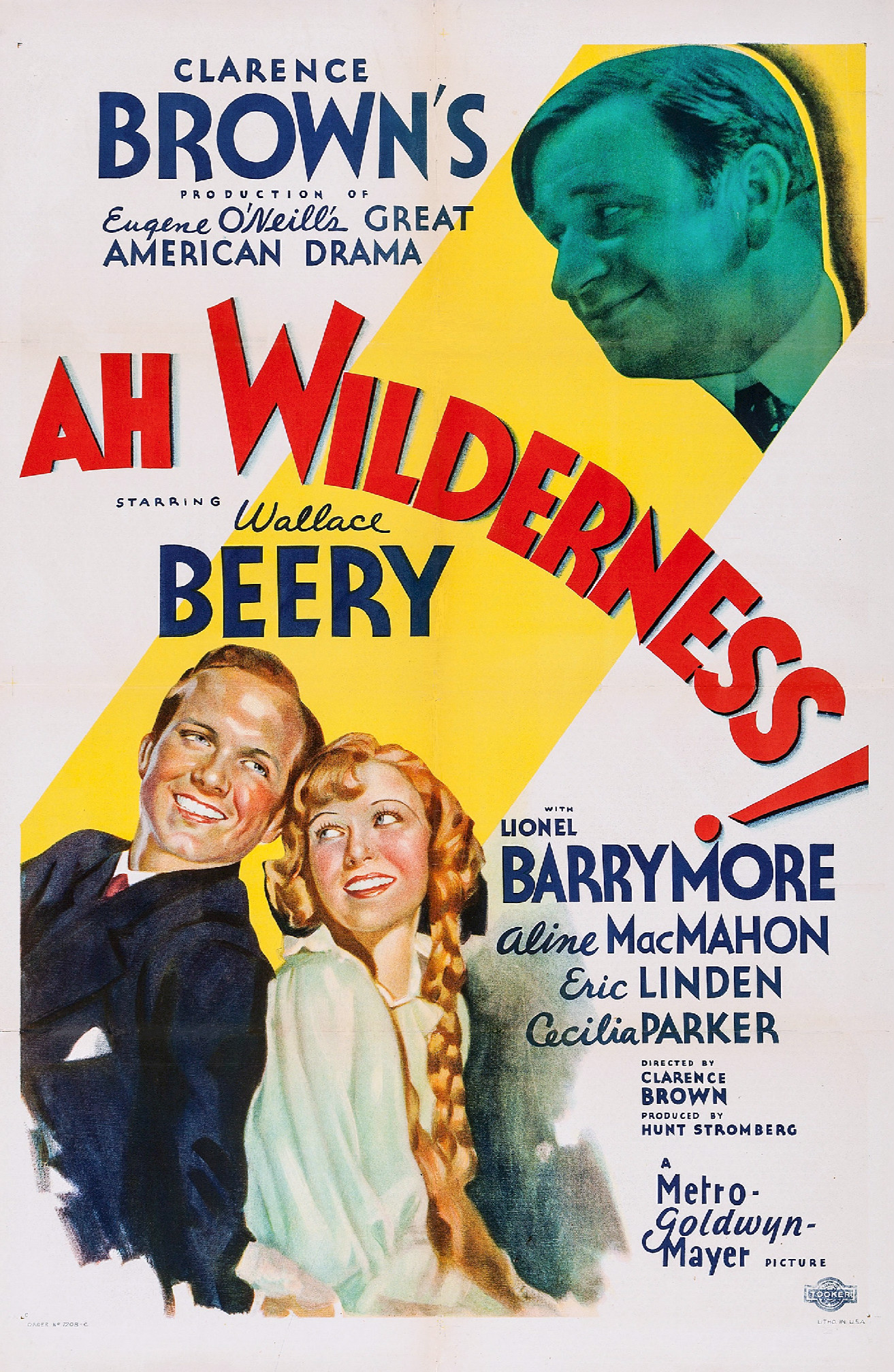
- Film poster
- Directed by: Clarence Brown
- Screenplay by: Albert Hackett; Frances Goodrich
- Based on: Ah, Wilderness! 1933 play by Eugene O'Neill
- Produced by: Clarence Brown; Hunt Stromberg
- Starring: Wallace Beery; Lionel Barrymore; Aline MacMahon; Eric Linden
- Cinematography: Clyde De Vinna
- Edited by: Frank E. Hull
- Music by: Herbert Stothart; Edward Ward
- Production company: Metro-Goldwyn-Mayer
- Distributed by: Loew's Inc.
- Release date: December 6, 1935
- Running time: 98 minutes
- Country: United States
- Language: English

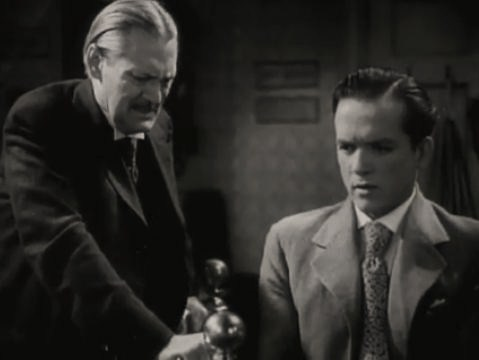
Lionel Barrymore and Eric Linden

Ah, Wilderness! is a 1935 American comedy-drama film adaptation of the 1933 Eugene O'Neill play of the same name. Directed by Clarence Brown, the film stars Wallace Beery and features Lionel Barrymore, Eric Linden, Cecilia Parker, Spring Byington and a young Mickey Rooney. The film was remade as Summer Holiday in 1948, with Rooney in the role played by Linden in Ah, Wilderness!.

The film's title is taken from a quatrain in the Rubáiyát of Omar Khayyam.

== Plot ==
In June 1906 in a New England town, 17-year-old Richard Miller is soon to graduate high school and attend Yale University. He already feels worldly wise, having read George Bernard Shaw, Oscar Wilde, the Rubáiyát of Omar Khayyam, Algernon Swinburne and Marxist tracts. He adores the neighborhood girl Muriel McComber, but she is afraid of being kissed.

Richard's father, newspaper editor Nat Miller, is a kind, wise man. Richard has three siblings: older brother Arthur home from Yale, sister Mildred and Tommy, the youngest. Uncle Sid and Cousin Lily live with the family. Sid, an alcohol abuser, repeatedly proposes marriage to Lily, but she refuses. Sid travels to his new job in Waterbury, Connecticut.

At his high school graduation, Richard drops his valedictory speech and Nat reads it, turning a burst of applause into a final acclamation and forestalling Richard's planned Marxist call to arms. On the morning of Independence Day, the street explodes in fireworks. The fired Uncle Sid reappears but says that he has the day off. Lily hints that she would accept a proposal now, but Sid does not propose and Lily is hurt.

Muriel's father angrily accuses Richard of corrupting his daughter's morals. He gives Nat the letters and a farewell letter from Muriel before threatening to pull his advertising from Nat's newspaper. Nat is concerned, but Richard reassures him that he plans to marry Muriel. When Richard reads the letter, he is heartbroken. Arthur's friend Wint asks Richard to accompany him on a double date.

The family reassembles at dinner, but Sid, who has regained his old job at Nat's newspaper, is intoxicated again and can barely stand. His antics elicit laughter, but Lily scolds the family for encouraging his behavior. Richard blames women for driving men to drink and leaves to meet Wint.

In a hotel bar, Wint has disappeared and Richard is sitting with a girl named Belle, who signals to the bartender to slip something into Richard's sloe gin fizz. Richard returns home drunk and miserable. The next evening, Muriel explains to Richard that her father forced her to write the letter. Nat and Richard have a serious talk about good and bad women.

== Cast ==
- Wallace Beery as Sidney Miller
- Lionel Barrymore as Nat Miller
- Aline MacMahon as Lily Davis
- Eric Linden as Richard "Dick" Miller
- Cecilia Parker as Muriel McComber
- Spring Byington as Essie Miller
- Mickey Rooney as Tommy Miller
- Charley Grapewin as Mr. Dave MacComber
- Frank Albertson as Arthur Miller
- Edward J. Nugent as Wint Selby
- Bonita Granville as Mildred Miller
- Helen Flint as Belle
- Helen Freeman as Miss Hawley
- Tom Dugan as George (uncredited)
- Eily Malyon as Norah (uncredited)
- Edward LeSaint as Minister (uncredited)

== Production ==
As Robert Benchley had been expected to play the role of Sid, the casting of Wallace Beery in August 1935 was a surprise announcement. Lewis Stone was considered for the role of Nat. William Henry and William Janney, who played the role in the stage production, were considered for the role of Richard.

Ah, Wilderness! was partially shot on location in Grafton, Massachusetts, where director Clarence Brown (who grew up in the region in the 1900s) encountered trouble with several local unions who objected to the employment of nonunion electricians, carpenters and musicians. Despite the union agitation, Grafton was flooded with visitors and police guarded the bandstand to prevent souvenir hunters from removing pieces of it.

== Reception ==
Wallace Beery as Sid Miller

In a 1935 review for The New York Times, critic Andre Sennwald wrote:

"In its warm, sprawling and achingly reminiscent mood of story-telling, It brings Mr. O'Neill's 'large small-town' in the New England of 1906 into a new richness of lite on the screen. As an American comedy of manners and as a portrait of an American family, 'Ah, Wilderness!' explores a vein of bitter-sweet nostalgia without losing its sense or humor. ... 'Ah, Wilderness!' reviews our yesterdays with tenderness, mature understanding and laughter that contains a hint of tears."

In another contemporary review, The Hollywood Reporter was also positive and argued that the film

"stands head and shoulders above the run of the mill for gentle humor, the drama of youth, the lovely memory and entertainment that one and all should see".

As the movie met with a lot of critical praise, MGM decided to start an Academy Awards campaign for the film – probably the first-ever organized studio advertising campaign for a movie. MGM ran trade-paper ads featuring their studio mascot, Leo the Lion, holding an Oscar statuette for Ah, Wilderness!, with the headline "You've given so much, Leo—now get ready to receive!". The campaign's then-unusual nature and persistence may proved to be a hindrance rather than a help; the film received no nominations, and it wasn't until several years later that Hollywood studios once again began running similar ads for films as Oscar contenders.

Nonetheless, Ah, Wilderness! proved to be an influential film for MGM. Following its success, the studio decided to focus more on family films set in small-town America. For the 1937 family comedy A Family Affair, six actors from this film were reunited in front of the camera: Barrymore, Parker, Linden, Rooney, Byington, and Grapewin. Barrymore once again played the role of the wise family patriarch. A Family Affair was a major success and became the founding film of the long-running Andy Hardy series, which turned Mickey Rooney into a star and shaped MGM's image. In 1948, MGM also produced the musical remake Summer Holiday, again with Rooney. However, the somewhat darker and more critical undertones of Ah, Wilderness! are absent from many of those MGM family films who followed in this path.

Clarence Brown's biographer Gwenda Young sees the film as being among the director's strongest works, and has a whole chapter dedicated to it in her 2018 biography of the director. In view of the later MGM pictures tailored after Ah, Wilderness!, Young writes: "Mayer liked it so much that he kept making variations of it (...) But none had the delicacy and heartfelt sincerity of Brown's original".

== See also ==
- Lionel Barrymore filmography
- Filmography of Wallace Beery
