= Let 'Em Have It =

1935 film by Sam Wood

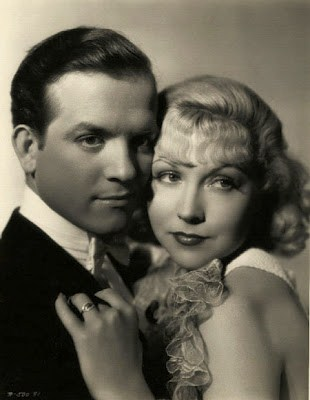
- Still with Eric Linden and Joyce Compton
- Directed by: Sam Wood
- Written by: Joseph Moncure Mach; Elmer Harris
- Produced by: Edward Small
- Starring: Richard Arlen; Virginia Bruce; Bruce Cabot
- Edited by: Grant Whytock
- Production company: Reliance Pictures
- Distributed by: United Artists
- Release date: 1935
- Country: United States
- Language: English

Let 'Em Have It is a 1935 American gangster film directed by Sam Wood. The film was also known under the title False Faces in the United Kingdom and The Legion of Valour in Australia.

== Plot ==
An FBI agent tracks down a gang leader.

== Cast ==
- Richard Arlen as Mal Stevens
- Virginia Bruce as Eleanor Spencer
- Alice Brady as Aunt Ethel
- Bruce Cabot as Joe Keefer
- Harvey Stephens as Van Rensseler
- Eric Linden as Buddy Spencer
- Joyce Compton as Barbara
- Gordon Jones as Tex
- J. Farrell MacDonald as Mr. Keefer
- Bodil Rosing as Mrs. Keefer
- Paul Stanton as Department Chief
- Hale Hamilton as Ex-Senator Reilly
- Robert Emmett O'Connor as Police Captain
- Dorothy Appleby as Lola
- Barbara Pepper as Milly
- Paul Fix as Sam

== Production ==
The film was shot at Pathe Studios. It was one of a series of movies that came out around this time about "G-Men". with the film giving the audience a look an FBI Headquarters and the training of a Special Agent.
