= Ever Since Eve (1934 film) =

1934 film by George Marshall

- Theatrical release poster
- Directed by: George Marshall
- Screenplay by: Stuart Anthony; Henry Johnson; Douglas Doty; Revisions; Kathryn Scola; Basil Woon; Dudley Nichols; Al Cohn
- Based on: The Heir to the Hoorah; 1905 play by Paul Armstrong
- Starring: George O'Brien; Mary Brian; Herbert Mundin; Betty Blythe; Roger Imhof; Russell Simpson
- Cinematography: Arthur C. Miller
- Music by: Samuel Kaylin
- Production company: Fox Film Corporation
- Distributed by: Fox Film Corporation
- Release date: March 25, 1934
- Running time: 77 minutes
- Country: United States
- Language: English

Ever Since Eve is a 1934 American drama film directed by George Marshall and written by Stuart Anthony and Henry Johnson. The film stars George O'Brien, Mary Brian, Herbert Mundin, Betty Blythe, Roger Imhof and Russell Simpson. The film was released on March 25, 1934, by Fox Film Corporation.

== Cast ==
- George O'Brien as Neil Rogers
- Mary Brian as Elizabeth Vandergrift
- Herbert Mundin as Horace Saunders
- Betty Blythe as Mrs. Vandergrift
- Roger Imhof as Dave Martin
- Russell Simpson as Jim Wood
- George Meeker as Philip Baxter
