= The Judgement Book =

1935 film directed by Charles Hutchison

- Directed by: Charles Hutchison
- Written by: Rose Gordon; E.J. Thornton
- Produced by: Charles Hutchison; Mitchell Leichter
- Starring: Conway Tearle; Bernadene Hayes; Howard Lang
- Cinematography: Robert Doran
- Edited by: Jimmy Aubrey
- Production company: Black King Productions
- Distributed by: Beaumont Pictures
- Release date: October 17, 1935
- Running time: 63 minutes
- Country: United States
- Language: English

The Judgement Book is a 1935 American Western film directed by Charles Hutchison and starring Conway Tearle, Bernadene Hayes and Howard Lang.

== Cast ==
- Conway Tearle as Steve Harper
- Bernadene Hayes as Madge Williams
- Howard Lang as Bill Williams
- Richard Cramer as Ross Rankin
- William Gould as Hank Osborne
- Steve Pendleton as Tim Osborne
- Roy Rice as James Burke
- Jimmy Aubrey as Ed Worden
- Ray Gallagher as Duffy Miller
- Philip Kieffer as Tracy
- Dick Rush as Sheriff Lee

== Bibliography ==
- Pitts, Michael R. Poverty Row Studios, 1929–1940: An Illustrated History of 55 Independent Film Companies, with a Filmography for Each. McFarland & Company, 2005.
