= Girl Loves Boy =

1937 film

- Theatrical release poster
- Directed by: W. Duncan Mansfield
- Screenplay by: W. Duncan Mansfield; Carroll Graham
- Story by: Karl Brown; Hinton Smith
- Produced by: B. F. Zeidman
- Starring: Eric Linden; Cecilia Parker; Roger Imhof; Dorothy Peterson; Pedro de Cordoba; Bernadene Hayes
- Cinematography: Edward Snyder
- Edited by: Edward Schroeder
- Production company: B. F. Ziedman Film
- Distributed by: Grand National Films Inc.
- Release date: March 27, 1937
- Running time: 77 minutes
- Country: United States
- Language: English

Girl Loves Boy is a 1937 American drama film directed by W. Duncan Mansfield and written by W. Duncan Mansfield and Carroll Graham. The film stars Eric Linden, Cecilia Parker, Roger Imhof, Dorothy Peterson, Pedro de Cordoba and Bernadene Hayes. The film was released on March 27, 1937, by Grand National Films Inc.

== Plot ==
Robert, a millionaire's son comes home after getting kicked out of college, married to Sally, a woman Robert's father suspects is a gold digger. After a brief conversation, Sally proves him right when she accepts Charles offer of money to annul the marriage to his son and leave town. One day at the local market Robert runs into his childhood friend Dorothy, there is an instant attraction to each other but Dorothy turns him down when Robert asks her out. Returning to the store, Robert runs into his father who insists Robert get a job. Working at the market, Robert and Dorothy get to know each other again and he invites Dorothy and her family to a family dinner. Charles, who happens to like the McCarthy family is pleased. So pleased that he arranges for Dorothy to play for his own house guest, the famous pianist Signor Luigi Montefiori.

Montefiori is so impressed that he decides to take on Dorothy as a student. While studying and practicing Robert and Sally fall more in love. Charles is not happy when he realizes this because he believes his son is not serious. Robert moves out of the family home and tells his father that he will prove how much Dorothy really means to him. One day Sally's little sister Penny sneaks out of the house on a winter night to the market only to become very ill. Everyone worries and prays that she gets better soon. Robert wants to do something special for Dorothy so he uses inheritance that his mother left him to arrange a concert for Dorothy.

Just as everything is coming together, Robert's former wife or you can say current wife comes back to town with her lawyer and inform Robert that they are still married and if he wants a divorce he'll have to give her half of his inheritance. When Robert meets with them later he tells Sally that he no longer has the money because he used it to give a concert. Not believing him, Sally and her lawyer go to the concert hall to talk to Robert's father and try to blackmail him as well. Robert and a Detective come in and inform them that Sally and her lawyer are con artists and married to each other. Dorothy comes back stage after playing terribly and learns of everything. Both are free to be together now.

== Cast ==
- Eric Linden as Robert Conrad
- Cecilia Parker as Dorothy McCarthy
- Roger Imhof as Charles Conrad
- Dorothy Peterson as Mary McCarthy
- Pedro de Cordoba as Signor Luigi Montefiori
- Bernadene Hayes as Sally Lacy
- Otto Hoffman as Gus Wilkey
- Patsy O'Connor as Penny McCarthy
- Rollo Lloyd as Dr. Williams
- Buster Phelps as Ned McCarthy
- John T. Murray as Venable
- Spencer Charters as Rufus Boggs
- Sherwood Bailey as Tim McCarthy
- Edwin Mordant as Parson Meeker
- Jameson Thomas as Mack
