= Old Hutch =

1936 film by J. Walter Ruben

- Directed by: J. Walter Ruben
- Screenplay by: George Kelly; Margaret Echard
- Based on: Old Hutch Lives Up to It by Garret Smith
- Produced by: Harry Rapf
- Starring: Wallace Beery; Eric Linden; Cecilia Parker
- Cinematography: Clyde De Vinna
- Edited by: Frank Sullivan
- Music by: William Axt
- Production company: Metro-Goldwyn-Mayer
- Distributed by: Metro-Goldwyn-Mayer
- Release date: September 25, 1936 (U.S. theatrical)
- Running time: 80 minutes
- Country: United States
- Language: English

Old Hutch is a 1936 American romantic comedy film directed by J. Walter Ruben and starring Wallace Beery as a man who finds $100,000 in the depths of the Great Depression. It is a remake of the 1920 Will Rogers film Honest Hutch.

The supporting cast features Eric Linden, Cecilia Parker, Robert McWade, Virginia Grey, Donald Meek and George Chandler.

== Plot ==
Wallace Beery as Hutch Hutchins (Old Hutch)

Hutch Hutchins, known locally as Old Hutch, is an unemployed man in the 1930s who hasn't worked in 20 years. He spends most of his time fishing. He has a wife and several children. The Gunnison family, local land owners, offered Hutch the chance to work an idle farm they own. Despite his wife pushing him to take the offer, Hutch would rather not work. His eldest daughter Irene is forced to take a job at Elliot's drugstore to help support the family. While working there, she meets Dave Jolly, a college student son of a prominent banker

One day, Hutch is fishing at his usual sport on the creek. Local passersby tease him about being a loafer, but he ignores them. Suddenly Hutch finds a tin box containing $100,000. Knowing that people would think he stole the money, Hutch buries the tin box. His plan is to come back for the money after getting a job, which would allow him to pass the money off as hard-earned wages.

Hutch goes home and tells his wife that he will accept Gunnison's offer to farm the land. After working for while at the new job, Hutch goes back to the creek to retrieve the tin box. To his dismay, he discovers that workmen have erected a construction shanty over the plot of ground containing the tin box. It is there because a new bridge is being constructed over the creek. It is being financed by the father of Dave Jolly. To complicate matters, Workers are spending nights in the shanty.

Hutch knows that he has to get the people out of the shanty so that he can go in and get the tin box. One night, Hutch approaches the shanty dressed as a ghost, but the workers start firing a gun at him. The next day, Hutch realizes that Jolly is building the bridge on Gunnison property without telling them. He goes to Jolly and demands a $1,000 bribe to stay quiets about it. Later on, Dave Jolly accompanies his father on a trip to the Hutchins house. While there, he invited Irene to a party.

When Hutch goes to the bank to cash the check from Jolly, he learns about a $100,000 bank robbery in Buffalo, New York. Furthermore, he is told that all the local banks are checking the serial numbers of any $1,000 bills they received against a list of serial numbers of the stolen money. Hutch now knows that he cannot deposit any of the tin box money. In a panic, he starts making arrangements to flee to a Island in the Pacific where he can safely spend the stolen money.

Hutch goes to Jolly to ask if he can tear down the construction shanty and use the wood to build a chicken coop. However, when he arrives at the Jolly estate, Dave Jolly's party is in progress and Irene is there. Hutch then proceeds to create an embarrassing scene during a poetry recital. Irene escorts her father home, and his wife upbraids him for ruining their daughter's evening.

A dejected Hutch then leaves home and goes to the construction shanty to dig up his treasure. When he finally locates and opens the tin box, he discovers that it is empty. Hutch collapses on the ground. He is found the next day and brought back to the Hutching house. While Hutch is muttering deliriously from a fever, Irene hears the story about the stolen money.

After his recovery, Hutch returns to the creek. He is immediately grabbed by a group of gangster, who speed off with him in their car. They had buried the money after the bank robbery and had it again. Then now plan to force Hutch to launder it for them. They first stop at Elliot's drugstore, where Irene is working. Suspicious of the men with her father, she calls the police. The gangster run with Hutch back to their car and take off. During the car chase, Hutch faints across the front seat and causes the car to crash. The police then catch the bank robbers. After Hutch's innocence is proven, he is hailed a hero and is rewarded with $5,000. He thus earns his first honest dollar in twenty years.

== Cast ==
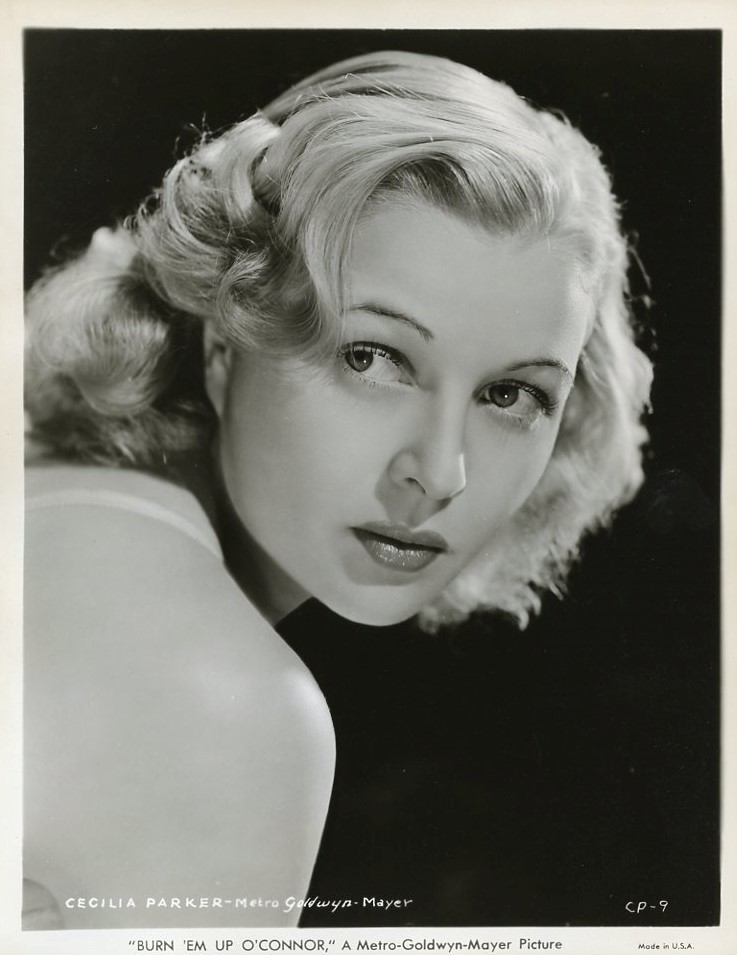
Cecilia Parker as Irene Hutchins

- Wallace Beery as Hutch Hutchins
- Eric Linden as Dave Jolly
- Cecilia Parker as Irene Hutchins
- Robert McWade as Mr. Jolly
- Caroline Perkins as Carrie Hutchins
- Julia Perkins as Julie Hutchins
- Delmar Watson as Allie Hutchins
- Harry Watson as Freddie Hutchins
- Virginia Grey as Ethel (in drugstore)
- Donald Meek as Mr. Gunnison
- George Chandler as Cigar Store Clerk
