= The Gay Vagabond =

1941 film by William Morgan

- Theatrical release poster
- Directed by: William Morgan
- Screenplay by: Ewart Adamson; Taylor Caven
- Produced by: Robert North
- Starring: Roscoe Karns; Ruth Donnelly; Ernest Truex; Margaret Hamilton; Abner Biberman; Bernadene Hayes
- Cinematography: Bud Thackery
- Edited by: Howard O'Neill
- Music by: Mort Glickman
- Production company: Republic Pictures
- Distributed by: Republic Pictures
- Release date: May 12, 1941
- Running time: 66 minutes
- Country: United States
- Language: English

The Gay Vagabond is a 1941 American comedy film directed by William Morgan and written by Ewart Adamson and Taylor Caven. The film stars Roscoe Karns, Ruth Donnelly, Ernest Truex, Margaret Hamilton, Abner Biberman and Bernadene Hayes. The film was released on May 12, 1941, by Republic Pictures.

== Plot ==
Arthur and Jerry Dixon are twin brothers, but they are very different: one is introverted and weak, the other is a womanizer and an adventurer who just arrived from China. The two switch roles.

== Cast ==
- Roscoe Karns as Arthur Dixon, Jerry Dixon
- Ruth Donnelly as Kate Dixon
- Ernest Truex as A.J. Wilber
- Margaret Hamilton as Agatha Badger
- Abner Biberman as Ratmar
- Bernadene Hayes as Spring Rutherford
- Lynn Merrick as Betty Dixon
- Rod Bacon as Franklin Atwater
- Gloria Franklin as Sonya
- Carol Adams as Lucille
- Byron Foulger as Vogel
- Paul Newlan as Lobang
