= Are These Our Children =

1931 film

Are These Our Children?
- Theatrical release poster
- Directed by: Wesley Ruggles
- Written by: Howard Estabrook (adaptation & dialogue)
- Story by: Wesley Ruggles
- Produced by: William LeBaron
- Starring: Eric Linden; Ben Alexander; Beryl Mercer; Mary Kornman; Arline Judge; Rochelle Hudson
- Cinematography: Leo Tover
- Edited by: William Hamilton
- Music by: Max Steiner
- Production company: RKO Pictures
- Distributed by: RKO Picture
- Release dates: November 13, 1931 (New York City); November 14, 1931 (US)
- Running time: 75 or 83 minutes
- Country: United States
- Language: English

Are These Our Children? is a 1931 American pre-Code drama film directed by Wesley Ruggles and written by Howard Estabrook. The film stars Eric Linden, Ben Alexander, Beryl Mercer, Mary Kornman, Arline Judge, and Rochelle Hudson. The film was released on November 14, 1931 by RKO Pictures.

== Plot ==
Eddie Brand s a high school student in New York City. After he loses an oratory contest about the U.S. Constitution, he becomes depressed and leaves his girl friend Mary to take up with Flo Carnes and her hardcore friends, Maybelle, Agnes, Nick Crosby and Bennie Gray, in spite of his grandmother's warnings. He and his new crowd of friends get drunk on gin in jazz clubs and dance halls, and start robbing strangers for cash. Eddie drops out of school and become more and more dependent on liquor.

One night, Eddie, needing a drink, shoots an old family friend, Heinrich "Heinie" Krantz, who has refused to sell him a bottle of booze. When Eddie, Nick and Bennie are arrested for the murder, Nick blurts out the truth on the witness stand, and Eddie is given the death penalty, with Nick and Bennie given life sentences.

== Cast ==
- Eric Linden as Edward "Eddie" Brand
- Ben Alexander as Nicholas "Nick" Crosby
- Beryl Mercer as Mrs. Martin, Eddie's Grandma
- Mary Kornman as Agnes "Dumbbell"
- Arline Judge as Florence "Flo" Carnes
- Roberta Gale as Maybelle "Giggles"
- Rochelle Hudson as Mary
- Billy Butts as Bobby Brand
- William Orlamond as Heinrich "Heinie" Krantz
- Bobby Quirk as Bennie Gray
- Ralf Harolde as Prosecutor
- James Wang as Sam Kong
- Robert McKenzie as Oscar Cook
- Earl Pingree as Charlie
- Russell Powell as Sam
- Harry Shutan as Defense attorney
