= Flying Devils =

1933 film by Russell Birdwell

- Directed by: Russell Birdwell
- Written by: Louis Stevens
- Screenplay by: Louis Stevens; Byron Morgan
- Produced by: Merian C. Cooper
- Starring: Bruce Cabot; Arline Judge; Eric Linden; Ralph Bellamy
- Cinematography: Nicholas Musuraca
- Edited by: Arthur Roberts
- Music by: Max Steiner
- Distributed by: RKO Radio Pictures
- Release date: July 14, 1933
- Running time: 60 or 62 minutes
- Country: United States
- Language: English
- Budget: $75,000

Flying Devils (a.k.a. The Flying Circus or Flying Circus) is a 1933 American Pre-Code action film dealing with aviation. The film was directed by former Hollywood agent Russell Birdwell and photographed by film noir cinematographer Nicholas Musuraca. The screenplay was written by Byron Morgan and Louis Stevens, based on an original story by Stevens. In an unusual move, Bruce Cabot was the star, with perennial "good guy" Ralph Bellamy playing the villain in a love triangle involving Arline Judge and Eric Linden. Although considered a "B" feature, audiences enjoyed the aerial scenes, which helped elevate the feature to a minor box-office hit.

== Plot ==
The "Black Cats", who are part of the Aerial Circus run by "Speed" Hardy, are a vagabond troupe of aerial performers in the 1930s. Speed takes on a new performer, former airmail pilot Ace Murray. After performing a "double parachute" jump with his kid brother Bud, who is also a pilot, Ace becomes aware that his brother is enamoured with Speed's young wife Ann. Bud and Ann perform the dangerous double parachute jump together, becoming the show's main attraction, but Speed becomes jealous of the romance forming between them. After a flight together, Bud and Ann crash-land and spend a night in a deserted cabin, leading to the realization that Ann must seek a divorce. When Speed discovers them, he apparently agrees to the new circumstances and surprisingly offers to design a new aerial stunt for Bud and himself that will have two aircraft colliding "head-on", with both of the pilots bailing out before the impact.

Before the stunt takes place, another pilot who is usually inebriated, "Screwy" Edwards, reveals that Speed has deliberately cut his rival's parachute and is planning an aerial murder. Ace takes off and crashes into Speed, sacrificing his life to save his brother. The two lovers eventually marry and due to Ace's earlier help in obtaining a job for him, Bud begins an airline career as a pilot alongside Edwards, who has begun a rehabilitation.

== Cast ==
As appearing in Flying Devils, (main roles and screen credits identified):

- Bruce Cabot as "Ace" Murray
- Arline Judge as Ann Hardy
- Eric Linden as Bud Murray
- Ralph Bellamy as "Speed" Hardy
- Cliff Edwards as "Screwy" Edwards
- June Brewster as Betty
- Frank LaRue as Al Kern
- Mary Carr as Mrs. Murray

The flying scenes were realistically staged with Hollywood pilot Frank Clarke doing most of the stunts. Bruce Cabot was also a pilot and appears in a number of scenes, doing his own flying.

== Production ==
David O Selznick brought in Merian C. Cooper, first as a writer, then associate producer and finally as executive producer, relying on him to get RKO back on its feet and in the black. Cooper, best remembered for masterminding the production of King Kong, was also an aviator. It was natural for RKO to feature a slate of air-minded pictures once Cooper was in charge. (Note: Cooper was very interested in aviation being a combat pilot himself in World War I, and in the inter-wear years, was a pioneer of commercial aviation in the United States.)

Producer David Lewis he did not like the original story of Russell Birdwell but was attracted to the setting. He said he borrowed much of the story from Sidney Howard's They Knew What They Wanted. Lewis cast from RKO contract players, saying "I didn’t know enough to go out and try to get better ones.... I really went shopping off the shelf, Bellamy was the only real actor and proved it. Frank Heron kept saying, “It’s the worst cast I ever heard of, justworst! Jesus, God, who the hell would look at it?” All knew at that point was that I could get the job done. It was that simple. I could start with nothing and end up with a picture. The idea of quality had not yet entered my head."

Lewis wanted Howard Shumate, who he had worked with on Tom Keene Westerns, to write the script but Cooper refused and wanted more prestigious writers.

Primarily shot in a backlot, Flying Devils overcame some of the limitations of the low-budget film format. Principal photography was begun in April 1933, using the RKO set at the Russell Brothers Ranch at Triunfo, with additional filming at Mines Field and Van Nuys, California. The aircraft used were a mix of Standard J-1, Stearman C-3R, Travel Air 2000 and 4000 stalwarts, the typical movie armada of the time.

David Lewia said Cooper wanted Birdwell off the film as the acting was poor and wanted Irving Pichel to replace him. Lewis said he kept Birdwell on the film but Pichel joined as dialogue director.

== Reception ==
In his August 26, 1933, review in The New York Times, Frank Nugent considered Flying Devils as a tried and true formula film. "The materials woven into its plot have seen so much service that most audiences will welcome them as old and trusted friends. There are, for example, the eternal triangle, brotherly love, the enaction of the theme, 'greater love hath no man,' &c.<sic>, and, finally, the always simple expedient of killing off the non-essential characters." Richard B. Jewell, Professor of American Film at the University of Southern California, wrote in The RKO Story, "... director Russell Birdwell, best known as one of the demon press agents of the era, was able to pump enough zip into the proceedings to please the public; it became a bantam box-office hit."
