= Big City Blues (1932 film) =

1932 film

- Theatrical poster
- Directed by: Mervyn LeRoy
- Written by: Lillie Hayward
- Based on: New York Town; 1932 play by Ward Morehouse
- Starring: Joan Blondell; Eric Linden; Jobyna Howland
- Cinematography: James Van Trees
- Edited by: Ray Curtiss
- Music by: Ray Heindorf; Bernhard Kaun
- Distributed by: Warner Bros. Pictures
- Release date: September 10, 1932
- Running time: 63 minutes
- Country: United States
- Language: English

Big City Blues is a 1932 American pre-Code drama film directed by Mervyn LeRoy and distributed by Warner Bros. Pictures. The film is based on the play New York Town by Ward Morehouse and stars Joan Blondell and Eric Linden, with uncredited early appearances by Humphrey Bogart and Lyle Talbot.

Original prints and copies of the motion picture are preserved in the collections of the Library of Congress, the UCLA Film and Television Archive, and in other major film repositories.

== Plot ==
Bud Reeves is a naive young man who lives in a small town in Indiana. After inheriting $1,100 ($26,000 today) from his aunt, he decides to use the money to move to New York City to find a job and start a new life. His dog Duke follows him to the railroad station, and the station agent says he will take care of the pup but only as a loan, because he is certain that Bud will return home in a month or less, having spent some time in the city himself and being well aware how tough life can be there.

Once in New York, Bud rents a modest but spacious hotel room and soon meets his much older, slick-talking cousin Gibby. Gibby immediately begins to fleece Bud out of small amounts of his cash to buy things. He also introduces him to chorus girl Vida Fleet and her friend Faun. Bud quickly falls in love with Vida.

Trouble soon starts when Gibby purchases a large amount of liquor and champagne from a local bootlegger and arranges a party in Bud's room. In addition to Vida and Faun, others joining the party include Jackie Devoe and more chorus girls, as well as three men: Stacky, Shep, and Lenny. Later in the evening, after considerable drinking, Shep and a very drunk Lenny begin arguing about who will take unconscious Jackie home. A fight ensues; furniture is overturned; and lamps are broken. As the lights go out, Shep and Lenny continue their brawl. Bottles are also being wildly thrown and used as weapons in the darkened room. When the lights come back on, the revelers discover that Jackie, lying on a couch, is dead, killed by one of the bottles hitting her head. Everyone except Bud hurriedly leaves the hotel room, even Vida. The house detective, Hummel, soon discovers Jackie's body after seeing Vida, who has returned to get Bud. The young couple flees, but are later arrested along with some of the other partiers. All are finally cleared of any charges when back at the hotel Hummel finds the real killer, Lenny, whose corpse is hanging in a closet. Evidence shows that he committed the crime, and that in his guilt and remorse over Jackie's death he hanged himself.

After a tearful goodbye with Vida, Bud goes back to Indiana, to find Duke patiently waiting for him at the station (the station agent collects on a bet he made over this). A telegraph he sends via the agent indicates he intends to return to New York after saving enough money, presumably to marry Vida.

== Cast ==
- Joan Blondell as Vida Fleet
- Eric Linden as Bud Reeves
- Jobyna Howland as Serena Cartlich
- Ned Sparks as "Stacky" Stackhouse
- Guy Kibbee as Hummell, the house detective
- Grant Mitchell as Station Agent
- Walter Catlett as Cousin "Gibby" Gibboney
- Inez Courtney as Faun
- Thomas Jackson as Detective Quelkin

Uncredited Cast

- Humphrey Bogart as Shep Adkins
- Josephine Dunn as Jackie DeVoe
- Evalyn Knapp as Jo-Jo
- Lyle Talbot as Len 'Lenny' Sully
- Sheila Terry as Lorna St. Clair
- Gloria Shea as Agnes
- Tom Dugan as Red
- Betty Gillette as Mabel
- Edward McWade as Baggage Master
- Wallis Clark as Chief of Police
- Selmer Jackson as Joe
- Clarence Muse as Nightclub Singer
- J. Carrol Naish as Bootlegger
- Dick Powell as Radio Announcer (voice)
