= Bernadene Hayes =

American actress (1912–1987)

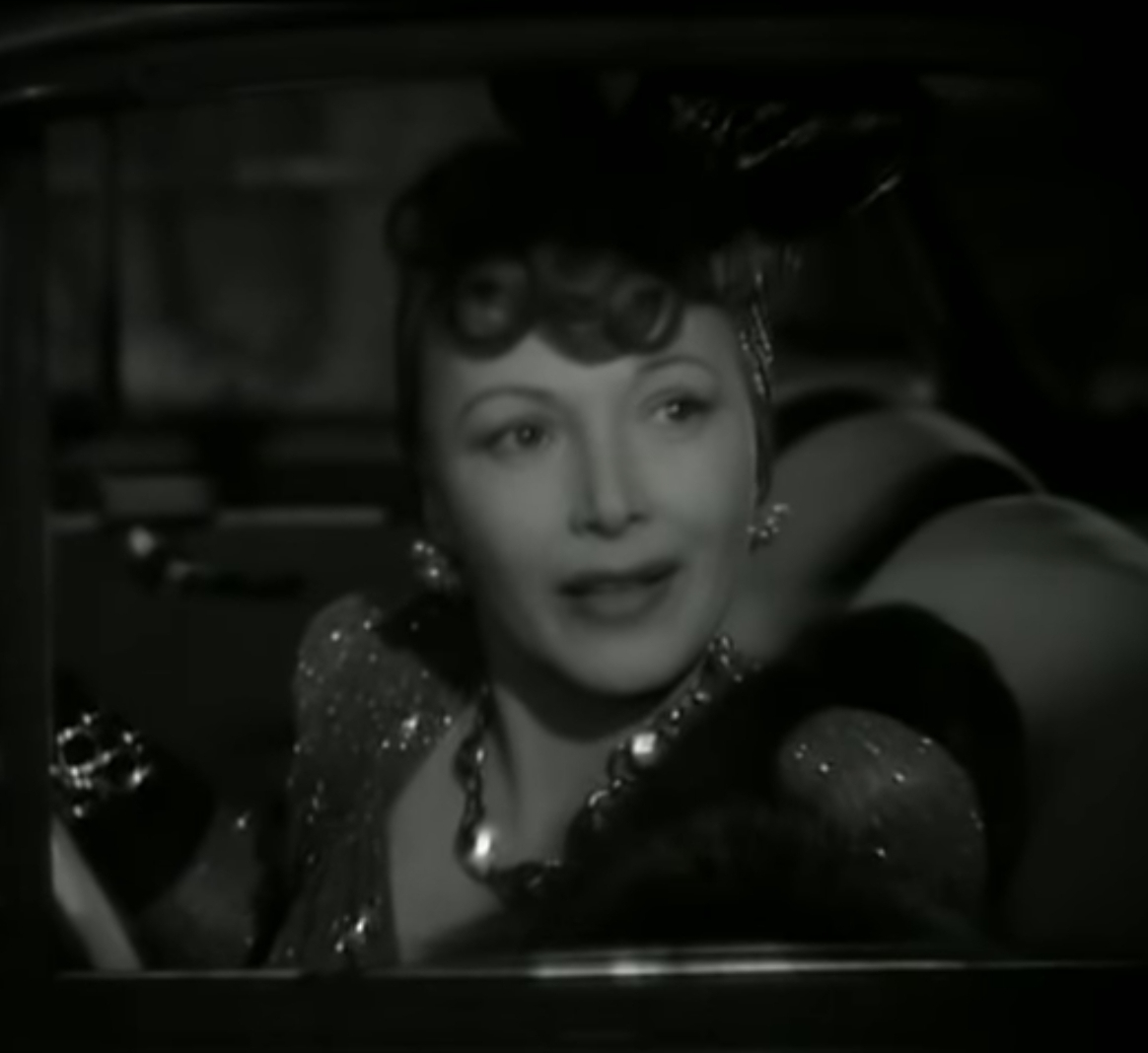
- Hayes in Dick Tracy's Dilemma (1947)
- Born: March 15, 1912; St. Louis, Missouri, U.S.
- Died: August 29, 1987 (aged 75); Los Angeles, California, U.S.
- Resting place: Holy Cross Cemetery, Culver City, California
- Occupation: Actress
- Years active: 1934–1956
- Known for: North of the Rio Grande

Bernadene Hayes (sometimes written as Bernadine Hayes; March 15, 1912 – August 29, 1987) was an American film and television actress. She also performed on radio and the stage, and as a singer.

== Early years ==
Hayes was a daughter of Mr. and Mrs. B. F. Hayes. She had three brothers and three sisters. She began performing in amateur productions when she was 9 years old. When she was in high school, she worked in a department store during vacation breaks. She graduated from Yeatman High School and attended Washington University for one semester.

== Career ==
Hayes first sang professionally when, at age 18, she filled in as a singer at Loew's State Theatre in St. Louis. A contract soon resulted, and she performed with Teddy Joyce and his band on a vaudeville tour. When she performed at an exhibition in St. Louis, the manager of the radio station KMOX heard her, which led to her becoming a performer on its staff. A year later, she moved to WWJ in Detroit. She joined the staff of the radio station WBBM as a singer in the fall of 1929, performing both on local programs and on CBS network broadcasts. As an actress, in 1930, she portrayed village matron Frances Nichols in The Quilting Party and Lib, a mountain girl, on Market Day; both programs were on CBS. On May 6, 1930, she returned to singing as she was featured in the weekly O'Cedar Time program. In September 1930 she was named the most beautiful radio performer in America.

After working in Chicago, Hayes moved to Los Angeles, where she sang with bands at The Hollywood Roosevelt Hotel and acted, beginning her work in films as an extra at $10 per day. Films in which she appeared included Absolute Quiet, Idiot's Delight, Living in a Big Way, This Gun for Hire, Great Guy, The Emperor's Candlesticks, King of Chinatown, The Judgement Book, Trigger Tom, Along Came Love, Bunco Squad, That's My Story, and The Accusing Finger. She portrayed the sassy saloon girl Faro Annie in North of the Rio Grande, and starred in the musical comedy Idiot's Delight in 1939. Her later screen appearances included a role as Longshot Lillie in 1947's Dick Tracy's Dilemma.

On Broadway, she had the roles of Mayme Speer in Mother Sings (1935), Hilda Zanhiser in Mid-West (1936), Gladys Cay in Aries Is Rising (1939, Mazie Stoner in Blind Alley (1940), Dean Baxter in School for Brides (1944), and Mona Gilbert in Make Yourself at Home (1945). She also acted in summer stock theatre and on stage in local productions in the Los Angeles area. She performed in several Little Theatre productions, notably at the Pasadena Playhouse. Her stage work included being featured in Make Yourself At Home at the Barrymore Theater in New York City in 1945.

She appeared on television in episodes of The Lineup, The Doctor and Boston Blackie.

== Personal life ==
On January 29, 1943, Hayes married the actor William Leicester in Chicago. She petitioned for divorce on July 7, 1948.

== Death ==
On August 29, 1987, Hayes died in her sleep of heart problems at the age of 75 in her home in the Westchester area of Los Angeles. Services were held at St. Jerome's Catholic Church, and she was buried at Holy Cross Cemetery.

== Filmography ==
- The Human Side (1934) – (uncredited)
- The Winning Ticket (1935) – Counter Woman (uncredited)
- The Whole Town's Talking (1935) – Waitress (uncredited)
- Folies Bergère de Paris (1935) – Girl in Bar (uncredited)
- Love in Bloom (1935) – Young Woman in Music Store (uncredited)
- Alias Mary Dow (1935) – Party Guest (uncredited)
- She Gets Her Man (1935) – Gun Moll (uncredited)
- Broadway Melody of 1936 (1935) – Waitress (uncredited)
- The Judgement Book (1935) – Madge Williams
- Rendezvous (1935) – Bobbie Burns (uncredited)
- Trigger Tom (1935) – Dorothy Jergenson
- Absolute Quiet (1936) – Judy
- Parole! (1936) – Joyce Daniels
- Along Came Love (1936) – Sarah Jewett
- The Accusing Finger (1936) – Muriel Goodwin
- Great Guy (1936) – Hazel
- Girl Loves Boy (1937) – Sally Lace
- Sweetheart of the Navy (1937) – Mazie
- North of the Rio Grande (1937) – Faro Annie
- The Emperor's Candlesticks (1937) – Mitzi Reisenbach
- Rustlers' Valley (1937) – Party Guest (uncredited)
- Trouble at Midnight (1937) – Marion
- That's My Story (1937) – Bonnie Rand
- My Old Kentucky Home (1938) – Gail Burke
- Prison Nurse (1938) – Pepper Clancy
- You and Me (1938) – Nellie
- Idiot's Delight (1939) – Les Blondes – Edna
- King of Chinatown (1939) – Dolly Warren
- Lucky Night (1939) – 'Blondie'
- Panama Lady (1939) – Pearl
- Some Like It Hot (1939) – Miss Marble
- 6,000 Enemies (1939) – Prisoner Flo (uncredited)
- The Day the Bookies Wept (1939) – Margie, Taxi Rider
- Heroes in Blue (1939) – Daisy
- Santa Fe Marshal (1940) – Paula Tate
- Sailor's Lady (1940) – Babe (uncredited)
- Manhattan Heartbeat (1940) – Shop Girl (uncredited)
- The Gay Vagabond (1941) – Spring Rutherford
- The Deadly Game (1941) – Mona Brandt
- Sing for Your Supper (1941) – Kay Martin
- Nazi Agent (1942) – Rosie (uncredited)
- This Gun for Hire (1942) – Albert Baker's Secretary
- I Live on Danger (1942) – Jonesy
- Mr. Winkle Goes to War (1944) – Gladys (uncredited)
- Don't Gamble with Strangers (1946) – Fay Benton
- The Thirteenth Hour (1947) – Mabel Sands
- Dick Tracy's Dilemma (1947) – Longshot Lillie the Fence
- Living in a Big Way (1947) – Dolly
- The Crimson Key (1947) – Mrs. Swann
- Women in the Night (1948) – Frau Thaler
- Caught (1949) – Mrs. Rudecki (uncredited)
- Bunco Squad (1950) – Princess Liane
- Wicked Woman (1953) – Mrs. Walters

== Bibliography ==
- Pitts, Michael R. Western Movies: A Guide to 5,105 Feature Films. McFarland, 2012.
