= Bruce Cabot =

American actor (1904–1972)

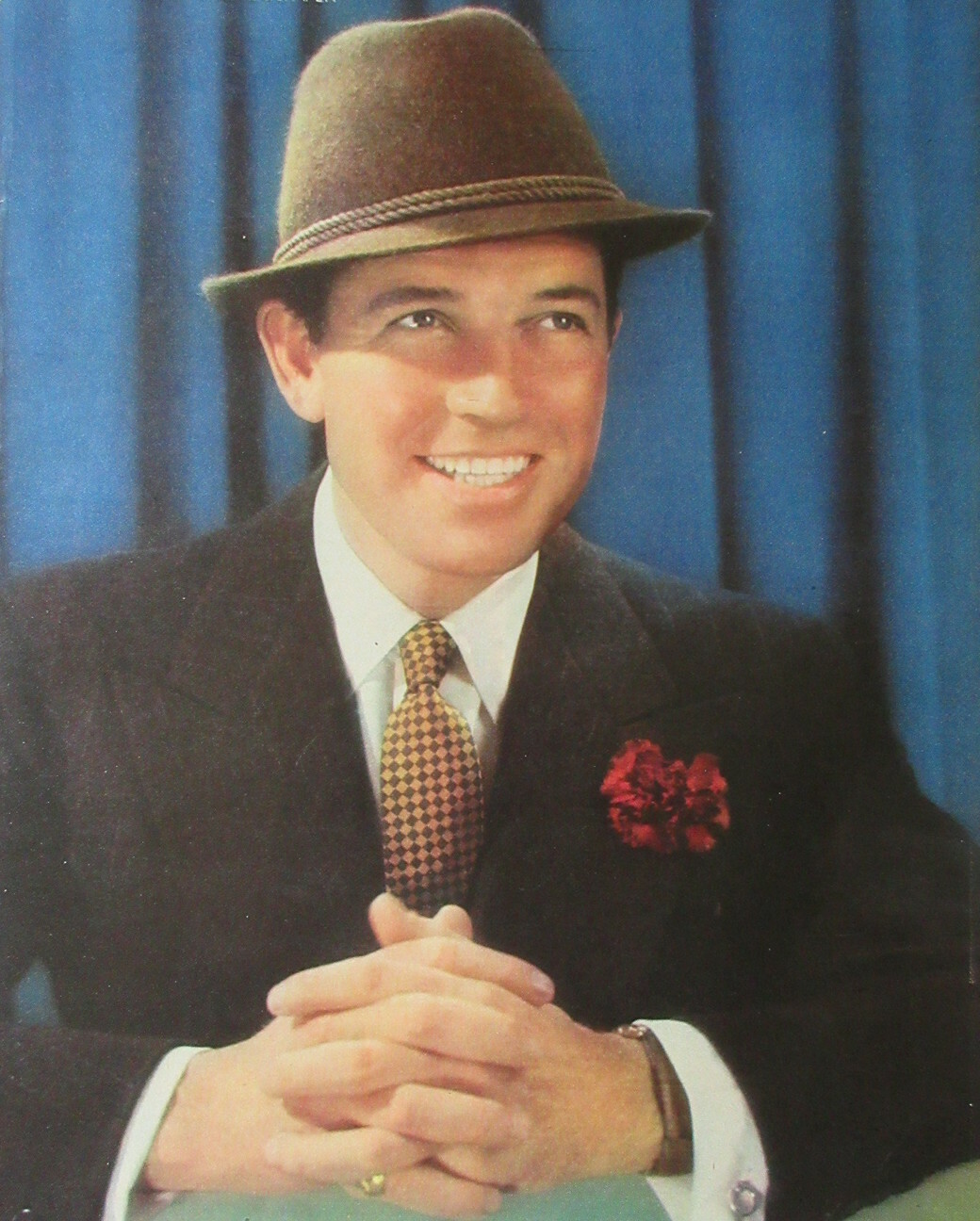
- Cabot in 1939
- Born: Étienne de Pelissier Bujac Jr. April 20, 1904; Carlsbad, Territory of New Mexico, U.S.
- Died: May 3, 1972 (aged 68); Woodland Hills, California, U.S.
- Occupation: Actor
- Years active: 1931–1971
- Spouses: Gracy Mary Mather-Smith (m. 1926; div. 1930) Adrienne Ames (m. 1933; div. 1935) Francesca De Scaffa (m. 1950; div. 1957)

Bruce Cabot (born Étienne de Pelissier Bujac Jr.; April 20, 1904 – May 3, 1972) was an American film actor, best remembered as Jack Driscoll in King Kong (1933) and for his roles in films such as The Last of the Mohicans (1936), Fritz Lang's Fury (1936), and the Western Dodge City (1939). He was also known as one of "Wayne's Regulars", appearing in a number of John Wayne films beginning with Angel and the Badman (1947), and concluding with Big Jake (1971).

== Early life ==
Cabot was born in Carlsbad, New Mexico, to a prominent local lawyer, Major Étienne de Pelissier Bujac Sr. and Julia Armandine Graves, who died shortly after giving birth to her son. Étienne Sr. was the son of John James (Jean-Jacques) Bujac, a lawyer and mining expert in Catonsville, Maryland. Cabot's father graduated from Cumberland School of Law near Nashville, Tennessee, and served in the U.S. Army during the Spanish–American War and the Philippine–American War before settling in Carlsbad.

Cabot graduated from Sewanee Military Academy in 1921, and briefly attended the University of the South in Sewanee, Tennessee, but left without graduating.

He worked at many jobs, including as a sailor, an insurance salesman, oil worker, surveyor, and prize fighter; he also sold cars, managed real estate, and worked at a slaughterhouse. A meeting with David O. Selznick at a Hollywood party led to his acting career. He claimed that he auditioned by acting out a scene from the play Chicago. The audition went "rather awful" in his opinion, but it did lead to him being cast in The Roadhouse Murder (1932).

== Acting career ==
=== Early roles ===
Cabot appeared in nearly 100 feature films. He made his debut in an uncredited bit part in an episode of the serial Heroes of the Flames (1931). In Ann Vickers (1933), he portrays a soldier who seduces a naive woman (Irene Dunne), and gets her pregnant before he leaves for the war. He then appeared in King Kong (also 1933), which became an enormous success and established Cabot as a star.

He also portrays villains in several productions, appearing as a gangster boss in Let 'Em Have It (1935) and as the Huron warrior Magua opposite Randolph Scott in The Last of the Mohicans (1936). He co-stars with Spencer Tracy in Fritz Lang's first Hollywood film, Fury (1936), playing the leader of a lynch mob. He also appears with Errol Flynn in Michael Curtiz's epic Western Dodge City, which in 1939 was one of Warner Bros.'s biggest hits.

He tested for the lead role of the Ringo Kid in John Ford's Stagecoach (1939), but John Wayne was cast in the part. A consistent box-office draw, Cabot appeared in many movies at many studios before leaving Hollywood to serve in World War II.

=== War service and return to Hollywood ===
Cabot enlisted in December 1942 and, after Officer Training School in Miami Beach, was commissioned as a first lieutenant in the U.S. Army Air Force. In 1943 Cabot was an Air Transport Command operations officer in Tunis.

Cabot headed back to Hollywood and fell in with John Wayne on the set of Angel and the Badman (1947), and became part of Wayne's circle, this relationship paying off in the 1960s, when Wayne cast him in 10 more of his films: The Comancheros (1961), Hatari! (1962), McLintock! (1963), In Harm's Way (1965), The War Wagon (1967), The Green Berets (1968), Hellfighters (1968), The Undefeated (1969), Chisum (1970), and Big Jake (1971).

In 1965, he played the sheriff in the comedy western Cat Ballou.

Cabot's final screen appearance is in the James Bond film Diamonds Are Forever (1971).

He was inducted into the New Mexico Entertainment Hall of Fame in 2012.

=== Television ===
Cabot starred in a number of the Tales of Tomorrow, a science-fiction drama, during its second season (1952–53) on ABC.

He also appeared on other television series, such as:

- Burke's Law - "Who Killed Holly Howard?" - Thomas Matherson (1963)
- Bonanza - "A Dime's Worth of Glory" - Sheriff Reed Larrimore (1964)
- Daniel Boone - "The Devil's Four" - Simon Bullard (1965)

== Personal life ==
On New Year's Eve 1926, Cabot married Grace Mary Mather-Smith at the Cathedral Church of St. Luke in Orlando. They divorced in 1930, prior to Cabot's move to Hollywood.

On Halloween 1933, Cabot married actress Adrienne Ames at his mother's home in Carlsbad. They divorced on July 24, 1935.

On September 17, 1950, Cabot married bit part actress Francesca De Scaffa in Santa Barbara. They divorced in February 1957.

He was one of Errol Flynn's social pack for several years, but they fell out during the production of the unfinished The Story of William Tell in the mid-1950s. Flynn was producing the film and asked Cabot, whom he described as "an old, old pal," to appear in it, knowing that Cabot was having difficulty finding work in Hollywood at that time. When Flynn's production partners went broke, though, production on the film halted, leaving Flynn stranded in Rome facing financial ruin. Cabot, in an attempt to get paid when other cast members were working for no money, had court officials seize Flynn's and co-producer Barry Mahon's personal cars and their wives' clothing from their hotel rooms.

In 1955, Bruce Cabot sued Flynn in a London court for unpaid salary of £17,357 ($48,599.60) saying he had been promised four weeks' work on the film but did not get it. Flynn wrote angrily in his autobiography of what he termed Cabot's "betrayal", adding the passage: " I never went looking for Cabot. I was afraid I might kill him."

== Death ==
Cabot died May 3, 1972, at age 68 in the Motion Picture Country Home at Woodland Hills, California due to lung cancer. He was buried in his hometown of Carlsbad, New Mexico.

== Filmography ==
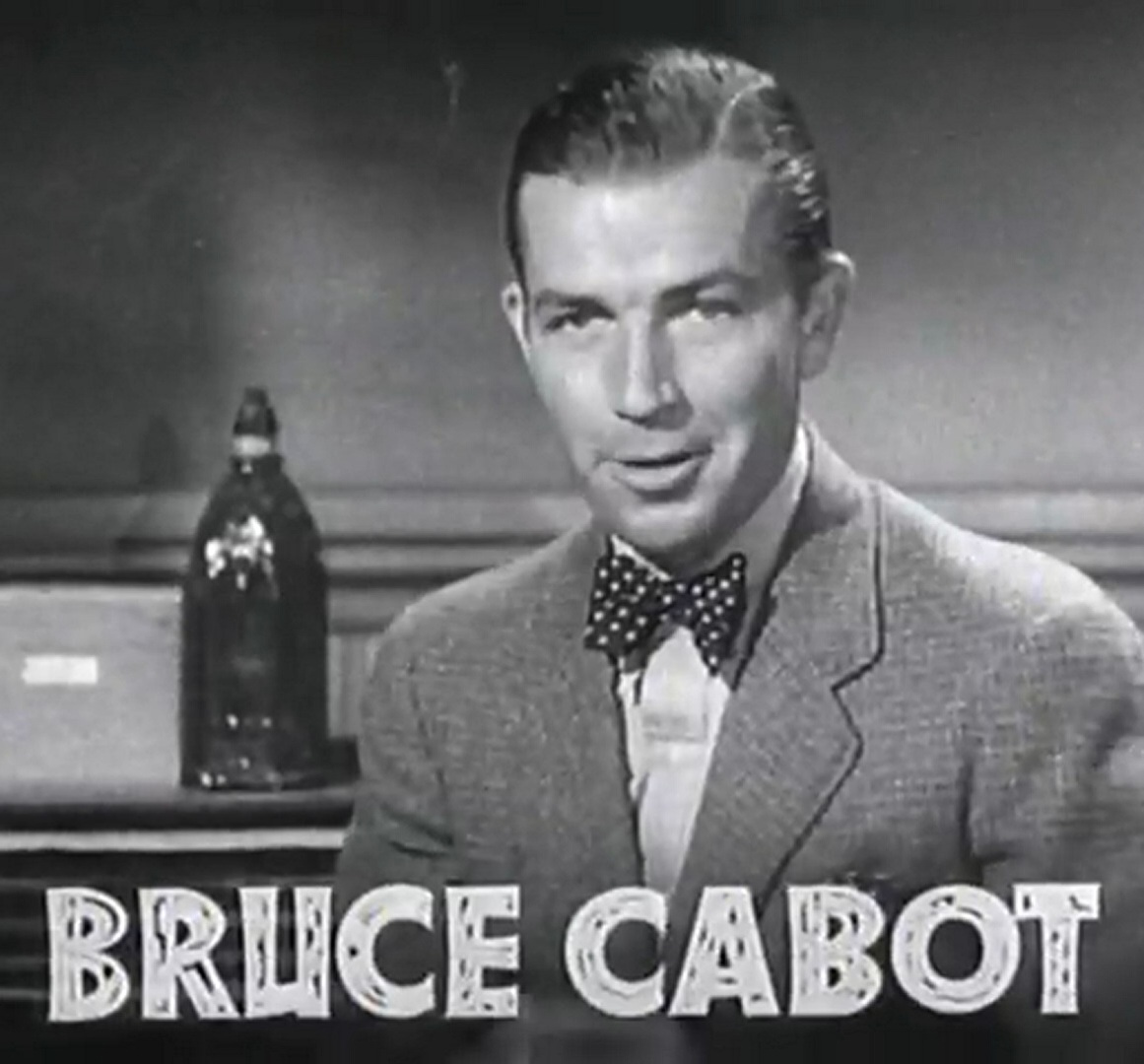
Cabot in the trailer for Fury (1936)

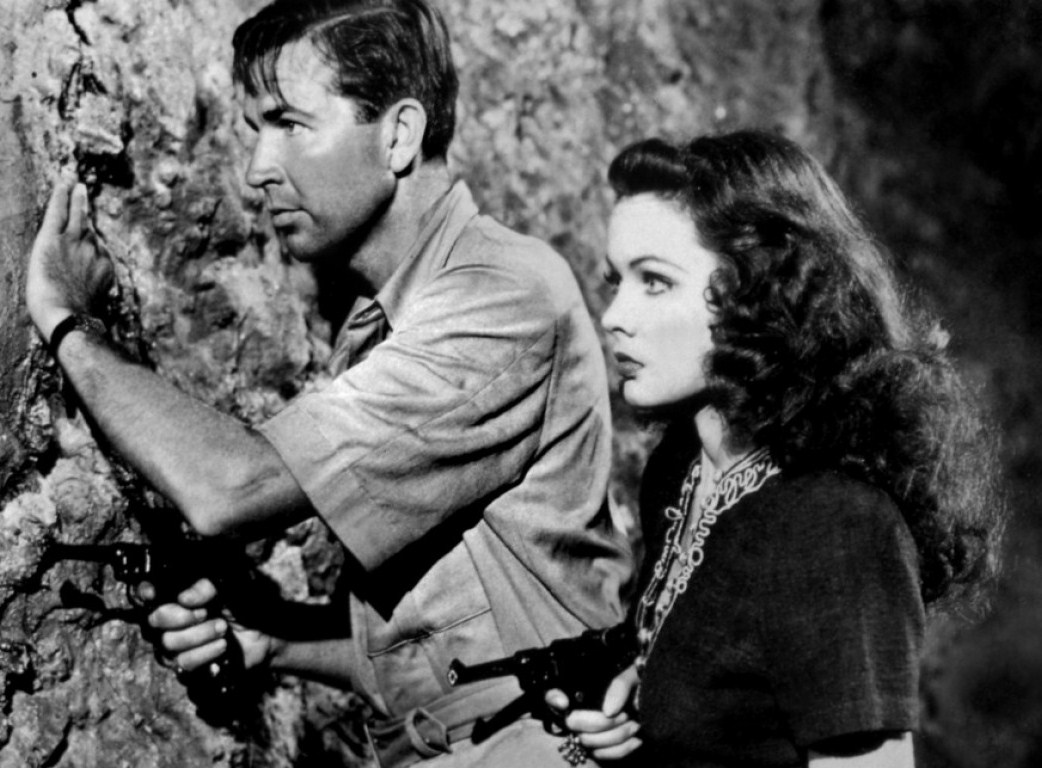
Cabot and Gene Tierney in Sundown (1941)

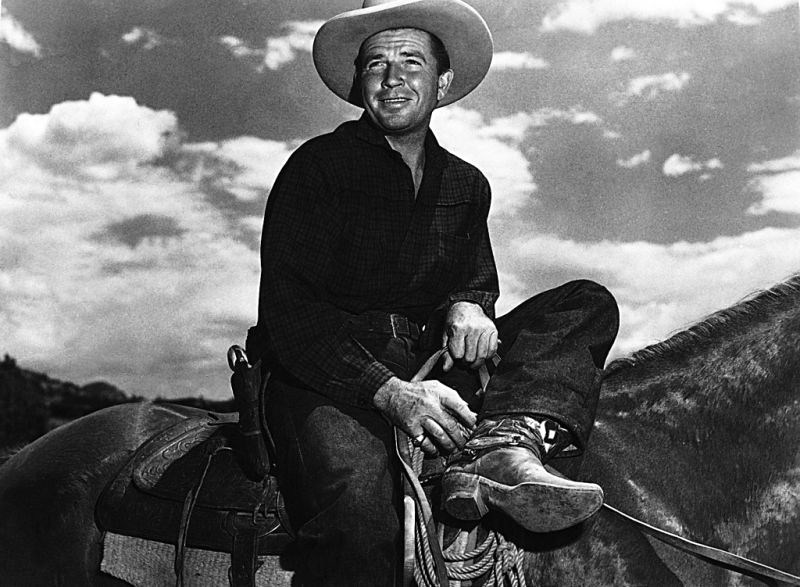
Cabot in the Western Angel and the Badman (1947)

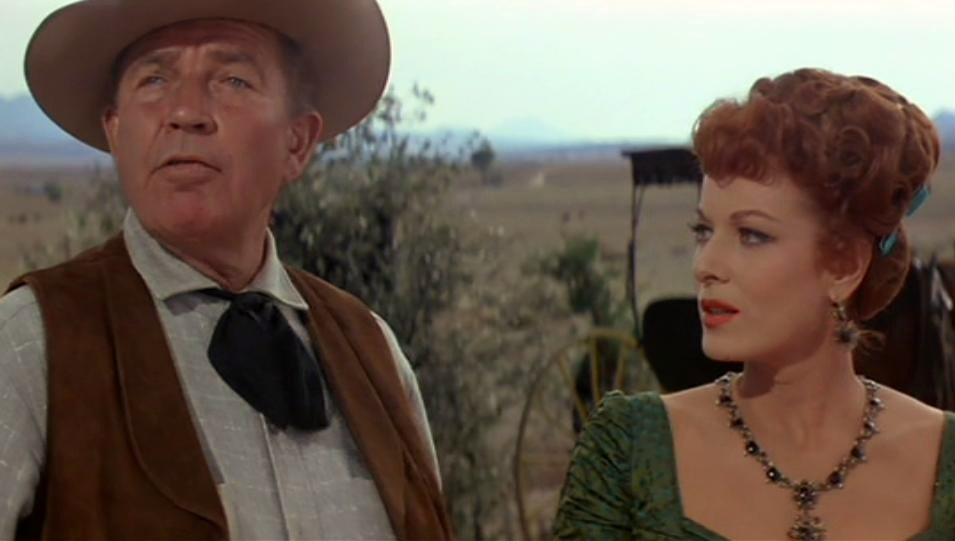
Cabot and Maureen O'Hara in McLintock! (1963)

- Heroes of the Flames (1931, Serial) Bit Part [ch.7] (film debut, uncredited)
- Confessions of a Co-Ed (1931) as Student at Dance (uncredited)
- Lady with a Past (1932) as Party Guest (uncredited)
- The Roadhouse Murder (1932) as Fred Dykes
- The Lost Special (1932, Serial) as Forest Ranger (uncredited)
- Lucky Devils (1933) as Happy White
- The Great Jasper (1933) as Roger McGowd (adult)
- King Kong (1933) as Jack Driscoll
- Scarlet River (1933) as Himself (uncredited)
- Disgraced! (1933) as Kirk Undwood Jr.
- Flying Devils (1933) as 'Ace' Murray
- Midshipman Jack (1933) as Jack Austin
- Ann Vickers (1933) as Capt. Lafayette Resnick
- Shadows of Sing Sing (1933) as Bob Martel
- Finishing School (1934) as Ralph McFarland - intern
- Murder on the Blackboard (1934) as Addison 'Ad' Stevens
- His Greatest Gamble (1934) as Stephen
- Their Big Moment (1934) as Lane Franklyn
- Redhead (1934) as Ted Brown
- Men of the Night (1934) as Det. Sgt. 'Stake-Out' Kelly
- Night Alarm (1934) as Hal Ashby
- Without Children (1935) as David F. Cole
- Let 'Em Have It (1935) as Joe Keefer
- Show Them No Mercy! (1935) as Pitch
- Don't Gamble with Love (1936) as Jerry Edwards
- The Robin Hood of El Dorado (1936) as Bill Warren
- The Three Wise Guys (1936) as Blackie
- Fury (1936) as Kirby Dawson
- The Last of the Mohicans (1936) as Magua
- Don't Turn 'Em Loose (1936) as Robert Webster - Alias Bat Williams
- The Big Game (1936) as Cal Calhoun
- Legion of Terror (1936) as Frank Marshall
- Sinner Take All (1936) as Ernie
- After the Thin Man (1936) as Party Guest (uncredited)
- Bad Guys (1937) as 'Lucky' Walden
- Love Takes Flight (1937) as Neil 'Brad' Bradshaw
- The Bad Man of Brimstone (1937) as 'Blackjack' McCreedy
- Sinners in Paradise (1938) as Robert Malone
- Smashing the Rackets (1938) as Steve Lawrence
- Tenth Avenue Kid (1938) as Jim 'Silk' Loomis
- Homicide Bureau (1939) (lead with Rita Hayworth) as Jim Logan
- Mystery of the White Room (1939) as Dr. Bob Clayton
- Dodge City (1939) as Jeff Surrett
- Mickey the Kid (1939) as Jim Larch/Jim Adams
- Traitor Spy (1939) as Carl Beyersdorf/Ted Healey
- My Son Is Guilty (1939) as Ritzy Kerry
- Susan and God (1940) as Michael
- Captain Caution (1940) as Slade
- Girls Under 21 (1940) as Smiley Ryan
- The Flame of New Orleans (1941) as Robert LaTour
- Sundown (1941) as William Crawford
- Wild Bill Hickok Rides (1942) as Wild Bill Hickok
- Pierre of the Plains (1942) as 'Jap' Durkin
- Silver Queen (1942) as Gerald Forsythe
- The Desert Song (1943) as Colonel Fontaine
- Salty O'Rourke (1945) as Doc Baxter
- Divorce (1945) as Bob Phillips
- Fallen Angel (1945) as Dave Atkins
- Smoky (1946) as Frank Denton
- Avalanche (1946) as Steve Batchellor
- Angel and the Badman (1947) as Laredo Stevens
- Gunfighters (1947) as Bard Macks
- The Gallant Legion (1948) as Beau Laroux
- Sorrowful Jones (1949) as Big Steve Holloway
- Rock Island Trail (1950) as Kirby Morrow
- Fancy Pants (1950) as Cart Belknap
- Best of the Badmen (1951) as Cole Younger
- Kid Monk Baroni (1952) as Mr. Hellman
- Lost in Alaska (1952) as Jake Stillman
- The Story of William Tell (1953) as Captain Jost
- The Red Cloak (1955) as Capitano Raniero d'Anversa
- Rommel's Treasure (1955) as Welles
- Totò, lascia o raddoppia? (1956) as Nick Molise
- The Quiet American (1958) as Bill Granger
- The Love Specialist (1958) as Mike
- The Sheriff of Fractured Jaw (1958) as Jack
- Guardatele ma non toccatele (1959) as Collonnello Joe Charleston
- John Paul Jones (1959) as Gunner Lowrie
- Goliath and the Barbarians (1959) as Alboino
- The Comancheros (1961) as Maj. Henry
- Hatari! (1962) as Little Wolf aka The Indian
- McLintock! (1963) as Ben Sage
- Law of the Lawless (1964) as Joe Rile
- In Harm's Way (1965) as Quartermaster Quoddy
- Black Spurs (1965) as Bill Henderson
- Cat Ballou (1965) as Sheriff Maledon
- Town Tamer (1965) as Riley Condor
- Choque de Sentimentos (1965)
- The Chase (1966) as Sol
- The War Wagon (1967) as Franklin Pierce
- The Green Berets (1968) as Colonel Morgan
- Hellfighters (1968) as Joe Horn
- The Undefeated (1969) as Jeff Newby
- Chisum (1970) as Sheriff Brady
- WUSA (1970) as King Wolyoe
- Big Jake (1971) as Sam Sharpnose
- Diamonds Are Forever (1971) as Bert Saxby (final film role)
