= Eric Linden =

American actor (1909–1994)

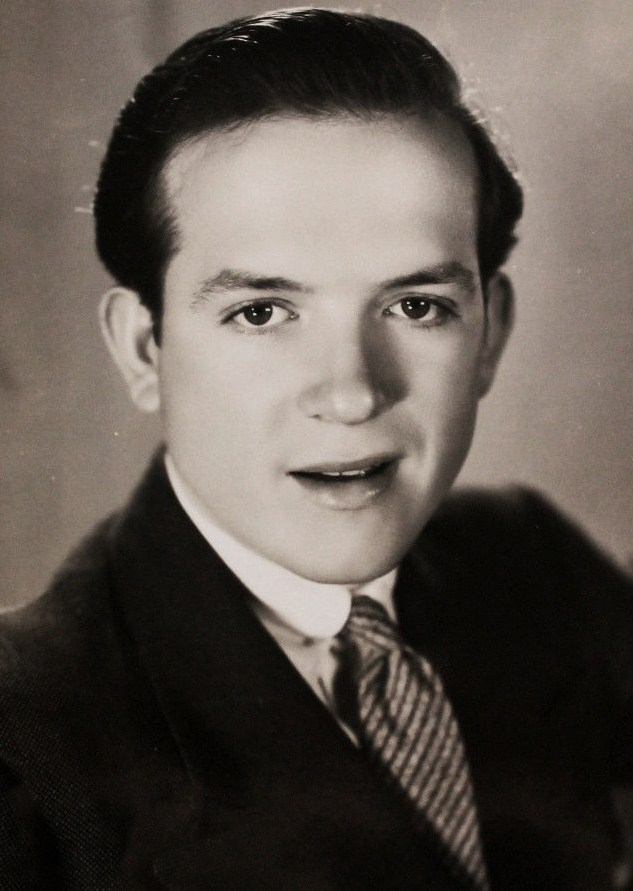
- Linden in Born to Gamble (1935)
- Born: September 15, 1909; New York City, U.S.
- Died: July 14, 1994 (aged 84); Laguna Beach, California, U.S.
- Years active: 1928–1941
- Spouse: Joanna Brown (m. 1955; div. 1977)
- Children: 3

Eric Linden (September 15, 1909 – July 14, 1994) was an American actor, primarily active during the 1930s and best-known for his portrayals of sensitive adolescents.

== Early years ==
Eric Linden was born in New York City to Phillip and Elvira (née Lundborg) Linden, both of Swedish descent. His father was a professional pianist and an actor on stage with the Royal Dramatic Theatre when he lived in Stockholm, Sweden. When Eric was six, Phillip Linden deserted his family in New York City.

To help support his mother, sister and two brothers, he began washing dishes at a cafe after school when he was 7 years old. He also sold newspapers on Tenth Avenue. Linden attended and participated in school plays at DeWitt Clinton High School. After graduation, he worked his way through Columbia University. His first job after graduating from Columbia was being a runner for a bank.

== Writing ==
Linden had ambitions of becoming a writer rather than an actor. By the time he was 22 years old, he had written three plays and 40 short stories, but none had been published. He had hoped to have saved enough money by age 30 to retire from acting and spend his time writing.

== Stage ==
Linden trained with the Theatre Guild for two years and went on to appear on Broadway in addition to acting in stock theater in Stockbridge, Massachusetts and acting in Paris, France, with the Paris-American Company. He appeared in an adaption of Faust on Broadway in 1928. Other stage credits included The Silver Cord, The Age of Consent, Life Begins, Sweepings, and Big City Blues.

== Film career ==
Linden made his film debut during the Great Depression in RKO Radio Pictures' 1931 crime film, Are These Our Children?, in which he played a young murderer who gets executed. He afterwards appeared in 33 films until 1941, mostly playing boyish second leads with occasional leading roles in smaller pictures.

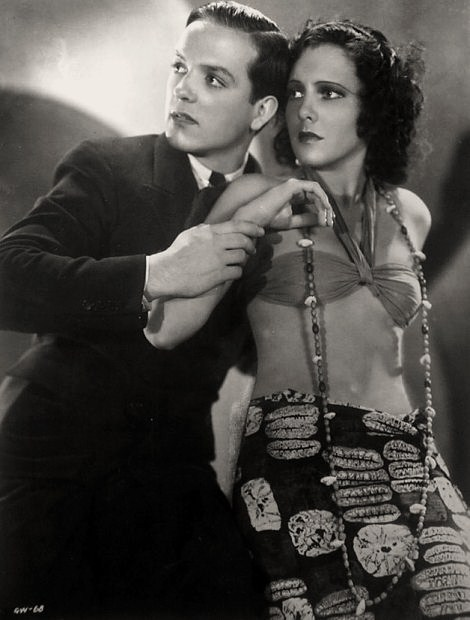
Eric Linden and Jean Arthur in The Past of Mary Holmes (1933)

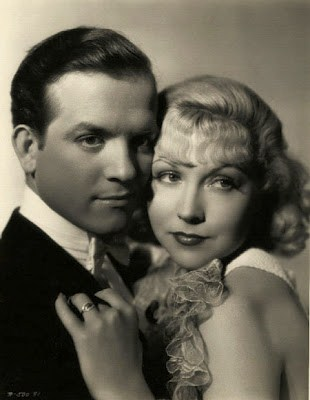
Eric Linden with Joyce Compton in Let 'Em Have It (1935)

Linden frequently portrayed "sensitive, intellectual, slightly weak-willed juveniles", sometimes with tragic destinies. His notable films include Big City Blues (1932) with Joan Blondell, Old Hutch (1936) opposite Wallace Beery, Ah, Wilderness! (1935) and A Family Affair (1937), both with Lionel Barrymore and Mickey Rooney, and The Good Old Soak (1937), again with Wallace Beery.

In 1939, Linden had a small but memorable role in the hospital in Gone with the Wind (1939) as the desperate soldier whose leg has to be amputated without chloroform; Linden's role was originally planned to be more extensive, but his screen time was reduced to less than a minute in post-production. His career petered out and he left Hollywood after his final role, a leading part in the low-budget-picture Criminals Within (1941).

After Hollywood, Linden returned to stage acting, going on to appear in such plays as The Philadelphia Story, My Sister Eileen, and Brighton Rock.

== Recognition ==
Linden has a star at 7098 Hollywood Boulevard in the Motion Pictures section of the Hollywood Walk of Fame. It was dedicated on February 8, 1960.

== Filmography ==
- Are These Our Children (1931) - Edward 'Eddie' Brand
- Young Bride (1932) - Charlie Riggs
- The Crowd Roars (1932) - Edward 'Eddie' Greer
- The Roadhouse Murder (1932) - Chick Brian
- The Age of Consent (1932) - Duke Galloway
- Life Begins (1932) - Jed Sutton
- Big City Blues (1932) - Bud Reeves
- Afraid to Talk (1932) - Eddie Martin
- No Other Woman (1933) - Joe Zarcovia
- The Past of Mary Holmes (1933) - Geoffrey Holmes
- Sweepings (1933) - Freddie Pardway
- The Silver Cord (1933) - Robert Phelps
- Flying Devils (1933) - Bud Murray
- I Give My Love (1934) - Paul Vadja Jr. - at Age 21
- Let 'Em Have It (1935) - Buddy Spencer
- Ladies Crave Excitement (1935) - Bob Starke
- Born to Gamble (1935) - Earl Mathews
- Ah, Wilderness! (1935) - Richard Miller
- The Voice of Bugle Ann (1936) - Benjy Davis
- Robin Hood of El Dorado (1936) - Johnnie 'Jack' Warren
- In His Steps (1936) - Tom Carver
- Old Hutch (1936) - David 'Dave' Jolly
- Career Woman (1936) - Everett Clark
- A Family Affair (1937) - Wayne Trent III
- Girl Loves Boy (1937) - Robert Conrad
- The Good Old Soak (1937) - Clemmie Hawley
- Sweetheart of the Navy (1937) - Eddie Harris
- Here's Flash Casey (1938) - Flash Casey
- Midnight Intruder (1938) - John Clark Reitter Jr., posing as Jay Rogers
- Romance of the Limberlost (1938) - Wayne
- Everything's on Ice (1939) - Leopold Eddington
- Gone with the Wind (1939) - Amputation Case
- Criminals Within (1941) - Cpl. Greg Carroll (final film role)
