= Life Begins (1932 film) =

1932 film

- Movie poster
- Directed by: James Flood
- Screenplay by: Earl Baldwin
- Based on: Life Begins; 1932 play by Mary McDougal Axelson
- Produced by: Darryl F. Zanuck
- Starring: Loretta Young; Eric Linden; Aline MacMahon; Glenda Farrell
- Cinematography: James Van Trees
- Edited by: George Marks
- Music by: Leo F. Forbstein
- Production company: First National Pictures
- Distributed by: Warner Bros. Pictures
- Release date: September 10, 1932
- Running time: 71 minutes
- Country: United States
- Language: English

Life Begins is a 1932 American pre-Code drama film starring Loretta Young, Eric Linden, Aline MacMahon, and Glenda Farrell. The film was adapted from the 1932 play of the same name by Mary M. Axelson. It was released by Warner Bros. Pictures on September 10, 1932. The film was praised for its honest portrayal of a maternity ward.

The film was remade by Warner Bros. as A Child is Born (1939) and again by Italy's Lux Film as Love Story (1942).

== Plot ==
At a maternity hospital, expectant fathers wait in the corridors while their wives anticipate childbirth with varying degrees of anxiety and excitement. Nurse Miss Bowers oversees the ward, maintaining its daily operations while providing care and support to the patients.

Things liven up when Grace Sutton is transferred from the prison where she is being held for murder. Most agree that the man she killed deserved to die, and Nurse Bowers sympathetically allows Grace's concerned husband Jed unlimited time with his wife.

In the ward, the women have varied feelings about motherhood. Mrs. West, a mother of six children, thinks babies are what give meaning to women's lives. In contrast, Florette, a showgirl, just wants to get rid of her twins as soon as possible. Miss Layton has decided opinions about child rearing and has no intention of being a doting mother. While the women debate their various theories, a woman who wants a baby so much that she has become demented wanders in from another ward. An Italian woman quietly sobs when she learns that her newborn has died.

After a touching farewell with Jed, Grace, whose health has suffered from prison conditions, is taken into the labor room. While Jed waits anxiously, Florette is appalled by the plans that the prospective adoptive mother of her twins has concocted. She cradles one baby herself and discovers mother love. Miss Layton has also given up on her progressive plans for her baby.

Down the hall, things are going badly for Grace. When the doctors ask Jed to choose between saving Grace or the baby, he chooses Grace, but she herself insists that the doctors operate and save the baby. After she dies, Jed refuses to see the baby girl, but wise Nurse Bowers places the child in his arms, and as with the mothers, he cannot resist her charms.

== Cast ==
- Loretta Young as Grace Sutton
- Eric Linden as Jed Sutton
- Aline MacMahon as Miss Bowers
- Glenda Farrell as Florette Darien
- Clara Blandick as Mrs. West
- Preston Foster as Dr. Brett
- Frank McHugh as Ringer Banks
- Gloria Shea as Gladys Banks
- Walter Walker as Dr. Tubby
- Elizabeth Patterson as Mrs. Tubby
- Esther Howard as Mrs. Tubby's Friend
- Hale Hamilton as Dr. Cramm
- Vivienne Osborne as Mrs. McGilvary
- Herbert Mundin as Mr. MacGilvairy
- Paul Fix as Anxious Expectant Father
- Frank Darien as Harry
- Bobs Watson as Edgar, Harry's Son
- Dorothy Peterson as A Patient
- Donald Douglas as Medical Student in a Business Suit
- Paul Fix as Anxious Expectant Father
- Mary Philips as Miss Pinty
- Dorothy Tree as Rita
- Gilbert Roland as Tony, Rita's Husband
- Ruthelma Stevens as Rose 'Rosie' Laughton

== Production ==
The film's pre-release titles were "Give Me a Child and Woman's Day". The Motion Picture Producers and Distributors of America expressed concern at the directness of the movie's subject, but in 1936, when the Hays Code was being enforced, still considered it acceptable for Warner Bros. to re-release the film. However, a large number of local, state, and international censor boards heavily edited the film or banned it completely. The British Board of Film Censors banned the film.

Elliott Nugent and James Flood had just directed The Mouthpiece together. Nugent said Life Begins was an even bigger hit and both men were offered a contract at Warners but they split up and agreed to work freelance.

== Reception ==
Mordaunt Hall of The New York Times wrote in his movie review: "It is a film endowed with fine performances by most of the players; the settings are realistic and the direction is of a high order. There are also some excellent character delineations, but the main thread of the story is disappointing. It is dragged out, and the closing interludes possess little in the way of drama. There is also too much harping on harrowing details."
