= The Past of Mary Holmes =

1933 film by Harlan Thompson

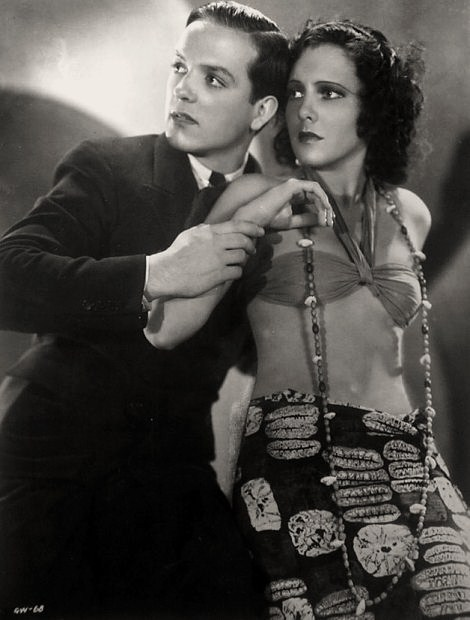
- Eric Linden and Jean Arthur in The Past of Mary Holmes
- Directed by: Slavko Vorkapich; Harlan Thompson
- Written by: Story: Rex Beach; Screenplay: Eddie Doherty; Marion Dix
- Produced by: Gordon Kay
- Cinematography: Charles Rosher
- Edited by: Charles L. Kimball
- Music by: Herman Stein
- Distributed by: RKO Pictures
- Release date: January 20, 1933
- Running time: 70 minutes
- Country: United States
- Language: English

The Past of Mary Holmes is a 1933 American pre-Code drama film, directed by Harlan Thompson and Slavko Vorkapich, and released by RKO. The film is a remake of the silent film The Goose Woman (1925), which is based on a short story by Rex Beach, partly based on the Hall-Mills murder case.

== Plot ==
Mary Holmes, once a famous opera star known as Maria di Nardi, now lives in a run-down shanty and suffers from alcoholism. Known for her eccentric behavior, Mary breeds geese, and is thus known in her neighborhood as "the Goose Woman". She blames her grown son Geoffrey for the deterioration of her voice and does everything she can to destroy his life.

When Geoffrey, a commercial artist, tells her that he is going to marry actress Joan Hoyt, she becomes torn with jealousy and threatens to reveal to Joan that he is illegitimate. Not allowing his mother the satisfaction of destroying his life, Geoffrey decides to break the news to Joan himself. Joan, who has just ended an affair with a womanizing theatre backer, G. K. Ethridge, tells him that she wants to proceed with their wedding plans. Geoffrey then breaks ties with his mother and heads out to Chicago on an assignment.

Meanwhile, Jacob Riggs, a doorman at the Ethridge theatre, shoots and kills his boss on the evening when he is awaiting his final rendezvous with Joan, due to his constant affairs with innocent women. Mary, who lives next to the place where the crime is committed, sees opportunity in getting recognition and fame as Maria di Nardi, after hearing the gunshots. She fabricates a sensational story for the press and media, unaware that her story implicates Geoffrey as a prime suspect.

Following drunken testimony by Mary, Geoffrey is indicted on circumstantial evidence by a grand jury. Despite denying the testimony when she realizes what she is doing to Geoffrey, he is found guilty and sent to jail, awaiting the death penalty. Overcome with grief, Mary uses Joan's help to convince Jacob to turn himself in for the crime. Geoffrey is freed from jail and can finally marry Joan. Mary burns down her shanty as a symbolic gesture of leaving her past behind, in order to join Geoffrey and her daughter-in-law in a joyful future.

== Cast ==
- Helen MacKellar as Mary Holmes/Maria di Nardi
- Eric Linden as Geoffrey Holmes
- Jean Arthur as Joan Hoyt
- Richard "Skeets" Gallagher as Ben Pratt
- Ivan F. Simpson as Jacob Riggs
- Clay Clement as G. K. Ethridge
- J. Carrol Naish as Gary Kent
- Roscoe Ates as Bill-poster Klondike
- Rochelle Hudson as Betty
- John Sheehan as Tom Kincaid
- Edward J. Nugent as Flanagan

== Background ==
Based on the short story of the same name, the film was initially in production under the title The Goose Woman. Initially, screenwriter Samuel Ornitz was to adapt the story with Marion Dix, but Eddie Doherty later took over.

Produced on a low budget, the film was released as a double feature in cinemas along with The Big Cage (1933).
