= Fury (1936 film) =

1936 film by Fritz Lang

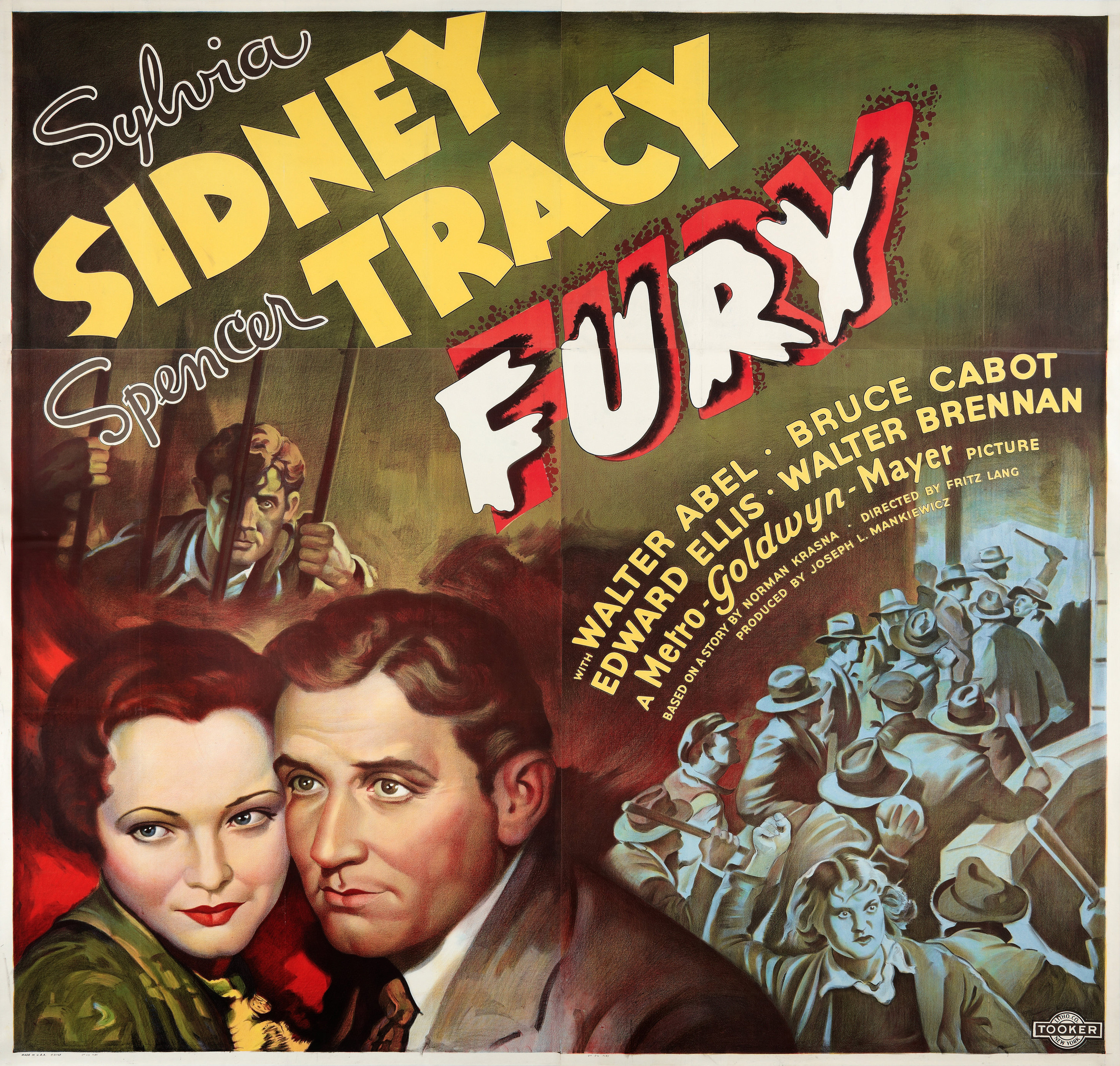
- Theatrical release poster
- Directed by: Fritz Lang
- Screenplay by: Bartlett Cormack; Fritz Lang
- Story by: Norman Krasna
- Produced by: Joseph L. Mankiewicz
- Starring: Sylvia Sidney; Spencer Tracy; Walter Abel; Bruce Cabot; Edward Ellis; Walter Brennan
- Cinematography: Joseph Ruttenberg
- Edited by: Frank Sullivan
- Music by: Franz Waxman
- Distributed by: Metro-Goldwyn-Mayer
- Release date: June 5, 1936
- Running time: 92 minutes
- Country: United States
- Language: English
- Budget: $604,000
- Box office: $1.3 million (rentals)

Fury is a 1936 American crime film directed by Fritz Lang that tells the story of an innocent man (Spencer Tracy) who narrowly escapes being burned to death by a lynch mob and the revenge he then seeks. It was Lang's first American film.

Released by Metro-Goldwyn-Mayer, the movie stars Sylvia Sidney and Tracy, with a supporting cast featuring Walter Abel, Bruce Cabot, Edward Ellis and Walter Brennan. Loosely based on the events surrounding the Brooke Hart murder in San Jose, California, the film was adapted by Bartlett Cormack and Lang from the story "Mob Rule" by Norman Krasna.

In 1995, it was selected for preservation in the U.S. National Film Registry by the Library of Congress as being deemed "culturally, historically, or aesthetically significant."

== Plot ==
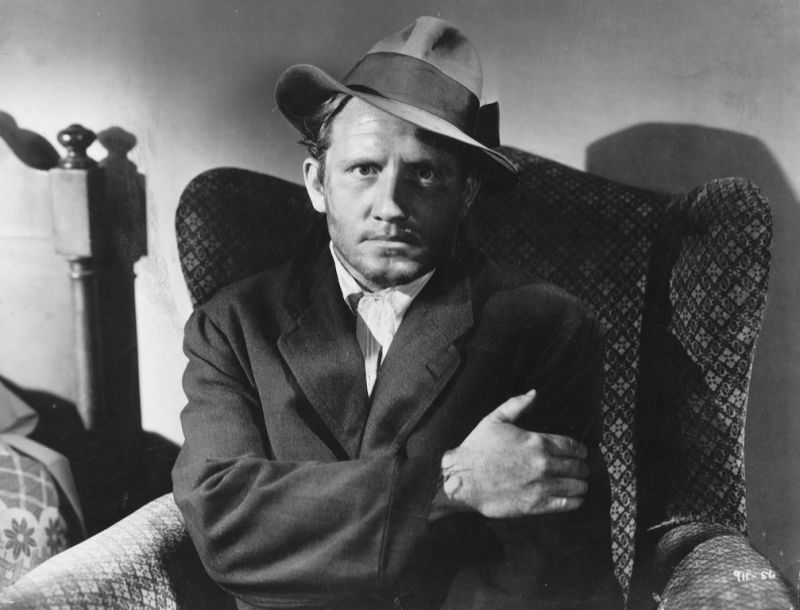
Spencer Tracy as Joe Wilson

En route to meet his fiancée Katherine Grant, gas-station owner Joe Wilson is arrested on flimsy circumstantial evidence for the kidnapping of a child. Gossip soon travels around the small town, growing more distorted through each retelling, until a mob gathers at the jail. When the resolute sheriff refuses to give up his prisoner, the enraged townspeople burn down the building, throwing dynamite into the flames as they flee the scene. Unknown to anyone else there, the blast frees Joe but kills his little dog Rainbow, who had run in to comfort him in the cell.

The district attorney brings the main perpetrators to trial for murder, but nobody is willing to identify the guilty, and several provide false alibis. The case seems hopeless, but then the prosecutor produces hard evidence: newsreel footage of 22 people caught in the act.

Katherine discovers that Joe escaped the fire and that his brothers are helping him take revenge by concealing his survival and framing the defendants for his murder. She goes to see Joe and pleads with him to stop the charade, but he is determined to make his would-be killers pay. His conscience begins to weigh on him and, just as the verdicts are being read, he walks into the courtroom and sets things straight.

== Cast ==
- Sylvia Sidney as Katherine Grant
- Spencer Tracy as Joe Wilson
- Walter Abel as Adams, the District Attorney
- Bruce Cabot as Kirby Dawson
- Edward Ellis as Sheriff
- Walter Brennan as "Bugs" Meyers
- Frank Albertson as Charlie
- George Walcott as Tom
- Arthur Stone as Durkin
- Morgan Wallace as Fred Garrett
- George Chandler as Milton Jackson
- Roger Gray as Stranger
- Edwin Maxwell as Will Vickery
- Howard Hickman as Governor
- Jonathan Hale as Defense Attorney
- Leila Bennett as Edna Hooper
- Esther Dale as Mrs. Whipple
- Helen Flint as Franchette
- Gwen Lee as Mrs. Fred Garrett (uncredited)
- Frederick Burton as Judge Daniel Hopkins (uncredited)

The part of Wilson's dog Rainbow was played by Terry, the same Cairn Terrier who played Toto in The Wizard of Oz.

== Development ==
Norman Krasna was inspired to write the story after reading about a lynching in The Nation. He pitched the idea to Samuel Marx and Joseph L. Mankiewicz at Metro-Goldwyn-Mayer, who were attracted to it. Krasna claimed that he did not write a script; he verbally pitched it to Mankiewicz, who then dictated it. Multiple changes were made from Krasna's story to the final script.

Fury was Lang's first American film, and is considered by critics to have been compromised by the studio, which forced Lang to tack on a reconciliation between Tracy's character and his girlfriend at the end. The film was a departure for MGM, known for its lavish musicals and glitzy dramas; the expensive production features expansive and stylized sets to create its gritty world, and its style is in keeping with the social-issue films often associated with Warner Bros., such as I Am a Fugitive from a Chain Gang.

Lang originally wanted to make a film about a black victim of a lynching, but the idea was rejected by MGM. Despite common belief, the Kiss scene and "Happy End" is not appended by the Producer, Lang stated in an interview. The change of the protagonist from a lawyer to a working-class man was introduced by MGM, as they preferred catering to the masses.

== Reception ==
The film received an Academy Award nomination for Best Writing, Original Story. Frank Nugent, in a review for The New York Times, praised it as "[a] mature, sober and penetrating investigation of a national blight." Writing for The Spectator in 1936, Graham Greene strongly praised the film, describing it as "the only film I know to which I have wanted to attach the epithet of 'great'." Expressing his view that the film completely conveyed the "sense of spiritual integrity ... by sound and image better than by any other medium," Greene drew particular attention to the contributions of Sylvia Sidney: "[S]he has never more deeply conveyed the pain and inarticulacy of tenderness ... no other director has got so completely the measure of his medium, is so consistently awake to the counterpoint of sound and image."

In 1995, the film was selected for preservation in the United States National Film Registry by the Library of Congress as being deemed "culturally, historically, or aesthetically significant." It was released on Blu-ray disc in the North American region by Warner Bros. in their Archive Collection in 2021.

The film earned domestic rentals of $685,000 and $617,000 overseas. According to MGM accounts, the final net profit was $248,000. On the review aggregator website Rotten Tomatoes, 95% of 19 critics' reviews are positive.
