= Red Lights Ahead =

1936 film by Roland D. Reed

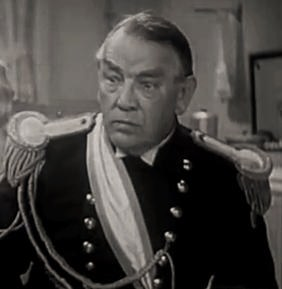
- Roger Imhof in the film
- Directed by: Roland D. Reed
- Written by: Robert Ellis; Helen Logan
- Produced by: George R. Batcheller
- Starring: Andy Clyde; Lucile Gleason; Roger Imhof
- Cinematography: M.A. Andersen
- Edited by: Dan Milner
- Production company: Chesterfield Pictures
- Distributed by: Chesterfield Pictures
- Release date: November 29, 1936
- Running time: 70 minutes
- Country: United States
- Language: English

Red Lights Ahead is a 1936 American comedy film directed by Roland D. Reed and starring Andy Clyde, Lucile Gleason and Roger Imhof. It was the last film released by the Poverty Row studio Chesterfield Pictures before it became part of Republic Pictures.

== Plot ==
A family evening situation with quarreling daughters and sons, about using the bathroom before their respective dates and evening programs, opens the movie. Two daughters and two sons. The younger son Willi being 17. Mary having allures of high society and psychic fortunetelling and crystal gazing. Edna changes her date partners a little too often and George dreaming to become speaker in the radio. Pa Wallace a hard working man and Ma looking for her children and managing the money for the family.

Unfortunately Mary meets a Mr. Nordham who pretends to be a scientific and gazes with her in the crystal ball announcing a big fortune coming from the earth (like oil), talking about aura colors to her mother, while Pa Wallace goes to his Whale Harpooners Broderhood Meeting, where the Grand Harpoon Mr. F. Q. Whitney (a sort of Master of Ceremony) wants to sell some very profitable stocks of a Gold Mine.

While Ma Wallace tries to keep her family with their feet on the ground, Pa Wallace and especially Mary are talked into it and when the next meeting with Nordingham and Whitney at Wallace home for a dinner takes place Pa Wallace hands a check about 5000 dollars to Mr. Whitney and Ma Wallace stays with the sorrow, that her home has been mortgaged for the goldmine Stocks.

Meantime Grandpa Hopkins who arrived to Wallace home from Kansas, to stay for good, who had talked on his own account to Whitney and Nordham has to collect his daughters sorrow.

But short after they get a phone call that the mine stocks are already giving the expected gain. Family starts to swim in money, a butler is hired that knows how to "find" everywhere money in the family, a maid pretending to be French tries to blackmail Mary, and some other not so funny things happen around.

Until the day, when Pa Wallace goes to a Whale Meeting and Mr. Whitney and Mr. Nordham are being arrested as crooks. The question then is where did the money come from. And surprisingly to all the source of all that wealth leads finally to cure the family members from their "blindness" and to become helpful to each other.

== Cast ==
- Andy Clyde as Grandpa Hopkins
- Lucile Gleason as Molly "Ma" Wallace
- Roger Imhof as Pa Wallace
- Ben Alexander as George Wallace
- Ann Doran as Mary Wallace
- Frank Coghlan Jr. as Willie Wallace
- Paula Stone as Edna Wallace
- Addison Randall as Nordingham
- Sam Flint as Franklin Q. Whitney
- Eleanor Stewart as Celeste - the Maid
- Herbert Clifton as Perkins
- Matty Kemp as Jerry Carruthers
