= North of the Rio Grande (1937 film) =

1937 film

- Directed by: Nate Watt
- Screenplay by: Joseph O'Donnell
- Based on: Cottonwood Gulch; 1924 story in Short Stories by Clarence E. Mulford
- Produced by: George A. Hirliman; Adolph Zukor
- Starring: William Boyd; George "Gabby" Hayes; Russell Hayden; Morris Ankrum; Bernadene Hayes; Jack Rutherford
- Cinematography: Russell Harlan
- Edited by: Robert B. Warwick Jr.
- Production companies: Harry Sherman Productions, Inc.
- Distributed by: Paramount Pictures
- Release date: June 25, 1937
- Running time: 70 minutes
- Country: United States
- Language: English

North of the Rio Grande is a 1937 American Western film directed by Nate Watt and written by Joseph O'Donnell. The film stars William Boyd, George "Gabby" Hayes, Russell Hayden, Morris Ankrum, Bernadene Hayes and Jack Rutherford. The film was released on June 25, 1937, by Paramount Pictures.

== Plot ==
Hopalong Cassidy's Brother, Buddy, who appeared one time in Hopalong Cassidy Returns (1936), is shot in the back by the Deputy Sheriff Plunkett. His friend Lucky tries to testify against Plunkett but is thwarted by the crooked coroner Stoneham.. Lucky tells Buddy's wife, Mary, that he's dead...then tells her he's going to tell Hopalong Cassidy. Hoppy plans to enter town anonymously as an outlaw and work from that premise. Hoppy arrives posing as an outlaw to avenge his brother's killing by Plunkett. After robbing a train and killing Plunkett, he gets to meet the boss known as the Lone Wolf and lead his next job. Seeking help from Stoneman to capture the outlaws, he realizes too late that Stoneman is the Lone Wolf and is captured.

== Cast ==
- William Boyd as Hopalong Cassidy
- George "Gabby" Hayes as Windy Halliday
- Russell Hayden as Lucky Jenkins
- Morris Ankrum as Henry Stoneham / Lone Wolf
- Bernadene Hayes as Faro Annie
- Jack Rutherford as 'Ace' Crowder
- Lorraine Randall as Mary Cassidy
- Walter Long as Patrick 'Bull' O'Hara
- Lee J. Cobb as RR President Wooden
- Al Ferguson as Deputy Sheriff Jim Plunkett
- John Beach as Clark

== Production ==
The railroad scenes were filmed on the Sierra Railroad in Tuolumne County, California.
