= Roger Imhof =

American actor

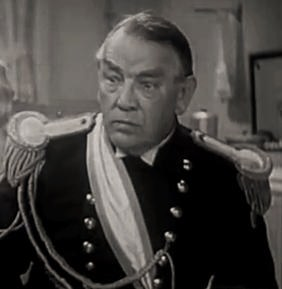
- Imhof in the film Red Lights Ahead (1936)
- Born: Frederick Roger Imhoff; April 15, 1875; Rock Island, Illinois, U.S.
- Died: April 15, 1958 (aged 83); Hollywood, Los Angeles, California, U.S.
- Occupation: Actor
- Years active: 1890–1950

Frederick Roger Imhof (August 15, 1875 – April 15, 1958) was an American film actor, vaudeville, burlesque and circus performer, sketch writer, and songwriter.

== Early years ==
Imhof was born in Rock Island, Illinois, on April 15, 1875, to Nicholas Imhoff, from Switzerland, and Susan McCluen Imhoff, from Ireland.

== Career ==
Imhof began his career as a clown with the Mills Orton Circus, and as an "Irish" comedian. He "toured in vaudeville and burlesque between 1895 and 1930." By 1897, he was "teamed with Charles Osborne in a comedy contortion and burlesque acrobatics act." Around this time, he dropped an "f" from his last name.

In the 1902–1903 season, he first worked with longtime vaudeville partner Hugh Conn, an association that lasted into the 1920s or possibly 1930s. Marcel Corinne (1888 – 1977), sometimes spelled Coreene, joined the act sometime in the 1910s. She and Imhof married in 1913. The trio of Imhof, Conn and Corinne toured in two comic sketches, "The Pest House" and "Surgeon Louder, U.S.A.", the latter "a military comedy" Imhof had written. "The Pest House" was "the most popular and longest running of several sketches starring the portly pair Roger Imhof and Marcel Corinne". According to an October 1920 edition of the Oregon Daily Journal, the sketch involved Imhof playing an Irish peddler who spends a mishap-filled night at an inn. In 1923, he appeared in the Broadway play Jack and Jill.

He reportedly invested in Chicago and Los Angeles real estate, but lost most of his money in the stock market and during the Great Depression.

He became involved early on in the nascent Hollywood film industry, apparently "as a presenter, promoter, or agent". As an actor, he appeared in films from 1932 to 1944, including San Francisco (1936), Drums Along the Mohawk (1939), The Grapes of Wrath (1940) and This Gun for Hire (1942).

Of the songs he composed, eleven are extant, including the 1906 "Old Broadway".

Imhof died on April 15, 1958, and was buried in Valhalla Memorial Park Cemetery.

== Papers ==
Collections of his papers and other material are held by the Green Library (Special Collections M0611), Department of Special Collections, Stanford University, and the Spencer Research Library (MS 121), University of Kansas.

== Partial filmography ==
- Me and My Gal (1932) - Down and Outer (uncredited)
- Paddy the Next Best Thing (1933) - Micky
- Charlie Chan's Greatest Case (1933) - The Beachcomber
- Hoop-La (1933) - Colonel Gowdy
- David Harum (1934) - Edwards
- Ever Since Eve (1934) - Dave Martin
- Sleepers East (1934) - MacGowan
- Wild Gold (1934) - James 'Pop' Benson
- Grand Canary (1934) - Jimmie Corcoran
- Handy Andy (1934) - Doc Burmeister
- Judge Priest (1934) - Billy Gaynor
- Love Time (1934) - Innkeeper
- Music in the Air (1934) - Burgomaster
- Under Pressure (1935) - George Breck
- One More Spring (1935) - Mr. Sweeney
- Life Begins at 40 (1935) - Pappy Smithers
- George White's 1935 Scandals (1935) - Officer Riley (uncredited)
- The Farmer Takes a Wife (1935) - Samson 'Sam' Weaver
- Steamboat Round the Bend (1935) - Pappy
- Riffraff (1936) - 'Pops'
- Three Godfathers (1936) - Sheriff
- Roaming Lady (1936) - Captain Murchison
- San Francisco (1936) - Alaska
- A Son Comes Home (1936) - Detective Kennedy
- In His Steps (1936) - Adams
- North of Nome (1936) - Judge Bridle
- Red Lights Ahead (1936) - Pa Wallace
- Girl Loves Boy (1937) - Charles Conrad
- Sweetheart of the Navy (1937) - Commander Lodge
- High, Wide, and Handsome (1937) - Pop Bowers
- There Goes the Groom (1937) - Hank
- Every Day's a Holiday (1937) - Trigger Mike
- The Adventures of Huckleberry Finn (1939) - Judge Logan at Jim's Trial (uncredited)
- Tell No Tales (1939) - Taxi Driver (uncredited)
- Nancy Drew... Trouble Shooter (1939) - Sheriff Barney Riggs
- They Shall Have Music (1939) - Michael - Deputy (uncredited)
- No Place to Go (1939) - Old Soldier (uncredited)
- Drums Along the Mohawk (1939) - Gen. Nicholas Herkimer
- Abe Lincoln in Illinois (1940) - Mr. Crimmin
- The Grapes of Wrath (1940) - Mr. Thomas
- Little Old New York (1940) - John Jacob Astor
- I Was an Adventuress (1940) - Henrich Von Korgen
- The Way of All Flesh (1940) - Franz Henzel
- Lady with Red Hair (1940) - Pat - the Lamplighter (uncredited)
- Victory (1940) - Captain Davidson (uncredited)
- The Lady from Cheyenne (1941) - Uncle Bill
- Man Hunt (1941) - Captain Jensen
- Mystery Ship (1941) - Capt. Randall
- This Woman Is Mine (1941) - John Jacob Astor (replaced by Sig Ruman) (uncredited)
- This Gun for Hire (1942) - Senator Burnett
- It Happened in Flatbush (1942) - Mr. Maguire
- Tennessee Johnson (1942) - Hannibal Hamlin (uncredited)
- Casanova in Burlesque (1944) - Joseph M. Kelly Sr.
- Home in Indiana (1944) - Roger - Old Timer (uncredited)
- Wilson (1944) - minor role (uncredited) (final film role)

== See also ==
- List of vaudeville performers: A–K
