= W. Duncan Mansfield =

American film editor

- Born: September 17, 1897; Birmingham, Alabama, U.S.
- Died: September 15, 1971 (aged 73); Hollywood, California, U.S.
- Occupation: Film editor
- Years active: 1918-1963

W. Duncan Mansfield (September 17, 1897 – September 15, 1971) was an American film editor. He worked as an editor on more than 50 films between 1918 and 1963. He was born in Alabama and died in Hollywood, California.

== Selected filmography ==
- The Law of Men (1919)
- Hard Boiled (1919)
- The Broken Melody (1919)
- Hairpins (1920)
- The Poor Simp (1920)
- His Wife's Money (1920)
- Tol'able David (1921)
- The Seventh Day (1922)
- Fury (1923)
- The Bond Boy (1923)
- The White Sister (1923)
- Romola (1924)
- On Approval (1930)
- In His Steps (1936)
- Girl Loves Boy (1937) (Director)
- A Walk in the Sun (1945)
