= Along Came Love (1936 film) =

1936 film by Bert Lytell

- Theatrical release poster
- Directed by: Bert Lytell
- Screenplay by: Arthur Caesar
- Produced by: Richard A. Rowland
- Starring: Irene Hervey; Charles Starrett; Doris Kenyon; H. B. Warner; Irene Franklin; Bernadene Hayes
- Cinematography: Ira H. Morgan
- Edited by: J. Edwin Robbins
- Music by: Gregory Stone
- Production company: Paramount Pictures
- Distributed by: Paramount Pictures
- Release date: November 6, 1936
- Running time: 72 minutes
- Country: United States
- Language: English

Along Came Love is a 1936 American comedy film directed by Bert Lytell and written by Arthur Caesar. The film stars Irene Hervey, Charles Starrett, Doris Kenyon, H. B. Warner, Irene Franklin and Bernadene Hayes. The film was released on November 6, 1936, by Paramount Pictures.

== Cast ==
- Irene Hervey as Emmy Grant
- Charles Starrett as John Patrick O'Ryan
- Doris Kenyon as Mrs. Gould
- H. B. Warner as Dr. Martin
- Irene Franklin as Mrs. Minnie 'Goldie' Grant
- Bernadene Hayes as Sarah Jewett
- Ferdinand Gottschalk as Mr. Vincent
- Charles Judels as Joe Jacobs
- Frank Reicher as Planetarium Lecturer
- Mathilde Comont as Customer
- Baby Edward as Baby Edward
