= List of Producers Releasing Corporation films =

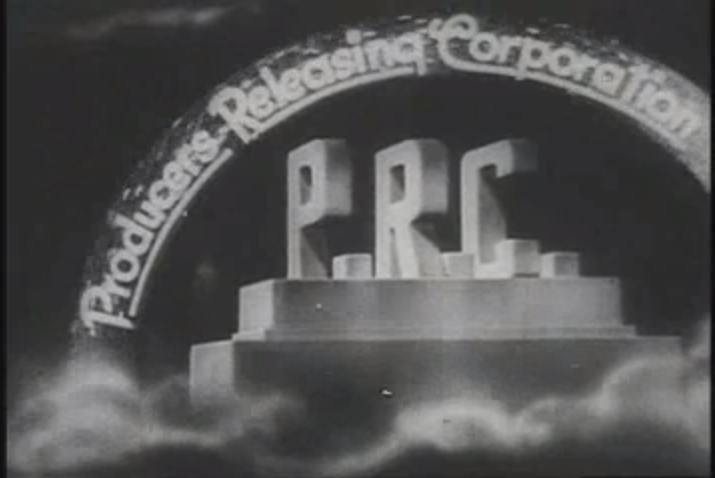
Producers Releasing Corporation's logo, from Billy the Kid in Texas

This is a listing of films produced and/or distributed by film company Producers Releasing Corporation, or PRC for short.

== Films ==
=== 1939 ===
Title	American Release Date	Director	Notes
Hitler – Beast of Berlin	October 8, 1939	Sam Newfield	
The Invisible Killer	November 14, 1939	Sam Newfield	
Mercy Plane	December 4, 1939	Richard Harlan	

=== 1940 ===
Title	American Release Date	Director	Notes
Texas Renegades	January 14, 1940	Sam Newfield	
I Take This Oath	May 20, 1940	Sam Newfield	
Frontier Crusader	June 15, 1940	Sam Newfield	
Hold That Woman!	June 28, 1940	Sam Newfield	
Billy the Kid Outlawed	July 20, 1940	Sam Newfield	
Gun Code	August 3, 1940	Sam Newfield	
Marked Men	August 28, 1940	Sam Newfield	
Arizona Gang Busters	September 16, 1940	Sam Newfield	
Billy the Kid in Texas	September 30, 1940	Sam Newfield	
The Devil Bat	November 11, 1940	Jean Yarbrough	
Riders of Black Mountain	November 11, 1940	Sam Newfield	
Misbehaving Husbands	December 20, 1940	William Beaudine	
Billy the Kid's Gun Justice	December 27, 1940	Sam Newfield	

=== 1941 ===
Title	American Release Date	Director	Notes
The Lone Rider Rides On	January 10, 1941	Sam Newfield	
Caught in the Act	January 17, 1941	Jean Yarbrough	
Billy the Kid's Range War	January 24, 1941	Sam Newfield	
Secret Evidence	January 31, 1941	William Nigh	
Outlaws of the Rio Grande	February 26, 1941	Sam Newfield	
The Lone Rider Crosses the Rio	February 28, 1941	Sam Newfield	
Emergency Landing	March 7, 1941	William Beaudine	
Federal Fugitives	March 29, 1941	William Beaudine	
Billy the Kid's Fighting Pals	April 18, 1941	Sam Newfield	
South of Panama	May 2, 1941	Jean Yarbrough	
The Lone Rider in Ghost Town	May 16, 1941	Sam Newfield	
Paper Bullets	June 13, 1941	Phil Rosen	
Criminals Within	June 27, 1941	Joseph H. Lewis	
Double Cross	June 27, 1941	Albert H. Kelley	
Desperate Cargo	July 4, 1941	William Beaudine	
Billy the Kid in Santa Fe	July 11, 1941	Sam Newfield	
The Texas Marshal	July 13, 1941	Sam Newfield	
Gambling Daughters	August 1, 1941	Max Nosseck	
The Lone Rider in Frontier Fury	August 8, 1941	Sam Newfield	
The Lone Rider Ambushed	August 29, 1941	Sam Newfield	
Reg'lar Fellers	September 5, 1941	Arthur Dreifuss	
Dangerous Lady	September 12, 1941	Bernard B. Ray	
Jungle Man	September 19, 1941	Harry L. Fraser	
Billy the Kid Wanted	October 4, 1941	Sam Newfield	
Mr. Celebrity	October 10, 1941	William Beaudine	
Hard Guy	October 17, 1941	Elmer Clifton	
The Lone Rider Fights Back	November 7, 1941	Sam Newfield	
The Miracle Kid	November 14, 1941	William Beaudine	
Swamp Woman	December 5, 1941	Elmer Clifton	
Billy the Kid's Round-Up	December 12, 1941	Sam Newfield	
Law of the Timber	December 19, 1941	Bernard B. Ray	
Blonde Comet	December 26, 1941	William Beaudine	

=== 1942 ===
Title	American Release Date	Director	Notes
Texas Man Hunt	January 2, 1942	Sam Newfield	
Today I Hang	January 9, 1942	Oliver Drake	
The Lone Rider and the Bandit	January 16, 1942	Sam Newfield	
Duke of the Navy	January 23, 1942	William Beaudine	
Broadway Big Shot	February 6, 1942	William Beaudine	
Raiders of the West	February 20, 1942	Sam Newfield	
Billy the Kid Trapped	February 27, 1942	Sam Newfield	
Too Many Women	February 27, 1942	Bernard B. Ray	
Girls' Town	March 6, 1942	Victor Halperin	
Rodeo Rhythm	March 13, 1942	Fred C. Newmeyer	
The Lone Rider in Cheyenne	March 20, 1942	Sam Newfield	
House of Errors	March 26, 1942	Bernard B. Ray	
The Dawn Express	March 27, 1942	Albert Herman	
East of Piccadilly	April 3, 1942	Harold Huth	Made in Britain; retitled The Strangler
Rolling Down the Great Divide	April 24, 1942	Sam Newfield	
Billy the Kid's Smoking Guns	May 1, 1942	Sam Newfield	
Inside the Law	May 8, 1942	Hamilton MacFadden	
The Mad Monster	May 15, 1942	Sam Newfield	
Men of San Quentin	May 15, 1942	William Beaudine	
The Panther's Claw	May 15, 1942	William Beaudine	
Gallant Lady	May 24, 1942	William Beaudine	
Bombs Over Burma	June 5, 1942	Joseph H. Lewis	
The Lone Rider in Texas Justice	June 5, 1942	Sam Newfield	
They Raid by Night	June 19, 1942	Spencer Gordon Bennet	
Tumbleweed Trail	July 10, 1942	Sam Newfield	
Prisoner of Japan	July 22, 1942	Arthur Ripley	
A Yank in Libya	July 24, 1942	Albert Herman	
Jungle Siren	August 14, 1942	Sam Newfield	
Law and Order	August 21, 1942	Sam Newfield	
Sheriff of Sage Valley	September 2, 1942	Sam Newfield	
Prairie Pals	September 4, 1942	Sam Newfield	
Baby Face Morgan	September 15, 1942	Arthur Dreifuss	
Border Roundup	September 18, 1942	Sam Newfield	
Tomorrow We Live	September 23, 1942	Edgar G. Ulmer	
Along the Sundown Trail	October 10, 1942	Sam Newfield	
Overland Stagecoach	October 11, 1942	Sam Newfield	
City of Silent Men	October 12, 1942	William Nigh	
Secrets of a Co-Ed	October 26, 1942	Joseph H. Lewis	
The Yanks Are Coming	November 9, 1942	Alexis Thurn-Taxis	
The Mysterious Rider	November 20, 1942	Sam Newfield	
Miss V from Moscow	November 23, 1942	Albert Herman	
Queen of Broadway	November 24, 1942	Sam Newfield	
The Payoff	November 24, 1942	Arthur Dreifuss	
Outlaws of Boulder Pass	November 28, 1942	Sam Newfield	
The Boss of Big Town	December 7, 1942	Arthur Dreifuss	
Lady from Chungking	December 21, 1942	William Nigh	
The Rangers Take Over	December 25, 1942	Albert Herman	

=== 1943 ===
Title	American Release Date	Director	Notes
Man of Courage	January 4, 1943	Alexis Thurn-Taxis	
The Kid Rides Again	January 27, 1943	Sam Newfield	
A Night for Crime	January 27, 1943	Alexis Thurn-Taxis	
Dead Men Walk	February 10, 1943	Sam Newfield	
Wild Horse Rustlers	February 12, 1943	Sam Newfield	
Bad Men of Thunder Gap	March 5, 1943	Albert Herman	
Behind Prison Walls	March 22, 1943	Steve Sekely	
Corregidor	March 29, 1943	William Nigh	
Fugitive of the Plains	April 1, 1943	Sam Newfield	
My Son, the Hero	April 5, 1943	Edgar G. Ulmer	
Terror House	April 19, 1943	Leslie Arliss	Made in Britain as The Night Has Eyes
The Ghost and the Guest	April 19, 1943	William Nigh	
Death Rides the Plains	May 7, 1943	Sam Newfield	
West of Texas	May 10, 1943	Oliver Drake	
Western Cyclone	May 14, 1943	Sam Newfield	
Girls in Chains	May 17, 1943	Edgar G. Ulmer	
The Black Raven	May 31, 1943	Sam Newfield	
Hitler's Madman	June 10, 1943	Douglas Sirk	
Border Buckaroos	June 15, 1943	Oliver Drake	
Wolves of the Range	June 21, 1943	Sam Newfield	
Follies Girl	June 26, 1943	William Rowland	
Submarine Base	July 20, 1943	Albert H. Kelley	
Law of the Saddle	July 28, 1943	Melville De Lay	
Fighting Valley	August 8, 1943	Oliver Drake	
Isle of Forgotten Sins	August 15, 1943	Edgar G. Ulmer	
Cattle Stampede	August 16, 1943	Sam Newfield	
Danger! Women at Work	August 23, 1943	Sam Newfield	
The Renegade	August 25, 1943	Sam Newfield	
Blazing Frontier	September 4, 1943	Sam Newfield	
Trail of Terror	September 7, 1943	Oliver Drake	
Tiger Fangs	September 10, 1943	Sam Newfield	
Raiders of Red Gap	September 30, 1943	Sam Newfield	
The Girl from Monterrey	October 4, 1943	Wallace Fox	
The Underdog	October 10, 1943	William Nigh	
The Return of the Rangers	October 26, 1943	Elmer Clifton	
Devil Riders	November 5, 1943	Sam Newfield	
Boss of Rawhide	November 20, 1943	Elmer Clifton	
Harvest Melody	November 22, 1943	Sam Newfield	
Suspected Person	November 29, 1943	Lawrence Huntington	Made in Britain
Jive Junction	December 16, 1943	Edgar G. Ulmer	

=== 1944 ===
Title	American Release Date	Director	Notes
Career Girl	January 11, 1944	Wallace Fox	
Nabonga	January 25, 1944	Sam Newfield	
Outlaw Roundup	February 10, 1944	Harry L. Fraser	
Men on Her Mind	February 12, 1944	Wallace Fox	
Frontier Outlaws	March 4, 1944	Sam Newfield	
Lady in the Death House	March 15, 1944	Steve Sekely	
Thundering Gun Slingers	March 25, 1944	Sam Newfield	
The Gang's All Here	March 29, 1944	Thornton Freeland	Made in Britain
Guns of the Law	March 31, 1944	Elmer Clifton	
The Monster Maker	April 15, 1944	Sam Newfield	
Shake Hands with Murder	April 22, 1944	Albert Herman	
The Pinto Bandit	April 27, 1944	Elmer Clifton	
Valley of Vengeance	May 5, 1944	Sam Newfield	
The Contender	May 10, 1944	Sam Newfield	
Spook Town	June 3, 1944	Elmer Clifton	
Waterfront	June 10, 1944	Steve Sekely	
The Drifter	June 14, 1944	Sam Newfield	
Fuzzy Settles Down	June 25, 1944	Sam Newfield	
Delinquent Daughters	July 15, 1944	Albert Herman	
Seven Doors to Death	July 27, 1944	Elmer Clifton	
Brand of the Devil	July 30, 1944	Harry L. Fraser	
Minstrel Man	August 1, 1944	Joseph H. Lewis	
Dixie Jamboree	August 15, 1944	Christy Cabanne	
Machine Gun Mama	August 18, 1944	Harold Young	
Gunsmoke Mesa	September 1, 1944	Harry L. Fraser	
Swing Hostess	September 8, 1944	Sam Newfield	
Gangsters of the Frontier	September 22, 1944	Elmer Clifton	
When the Lights Go On Again	October 23, 1944	William K. Howard	
Wild Horse Phantom	October 28, 1944	Sam Newfield	
I'm from Arkansas	October 31, 1944	Lew Landers	
I Accuse My Parents	November 4, 1944	Sam Newfield	
Dead or Alive	November 9, 1944	Elmer Clifton	
Bluebeard	November 11, 1944	Edgar G. Ulmer	
The Great Mike	November 15, 1944	Wallace Fox	
Rogues' Gallery	December 6, 1944	Albert Herman	
Oath of Vengeance	December 9, 1944	Sam Newfield	
The Town Went Wild	December 15, 1944	Ralph Murphy	
The Whispering Skull	December 29, 1944	Elmer Clifton	

=== 1945 ===
Title	American Release Date	Director	Notes
His Brother's Ghost	February 3, 1945	Sam Newfield	
The Kid Sister	February 6, 1945	Sam Newfield	
Marked for Murder	February 8, 1945	Elmer Clifton	
Spellbound	February 10, 1945	John Harlow	Made in Britain
Fog Island	February 15, 1945	Terry O. Morse	
The Man Who Walked Alone	March 15, 1945	Christy Cabanne	
Strange Illusion	March 31, 1945	Edgar G. Ulmer	
Crime, Inc.	April 15, 1945	Lew Landers	
Shadows of Death	April 19, 1945	Sam Newfield	
Hollywood and Vine	April 25, 1945	Alexis Thurn-Taxis	
The Phantom of 42nd Street	May 2, 1945	Albert Herman	
Enemy of the Law	May 7, 1945	Harry L. Fraser	
The Lady Confesses	May 16, 1945	Harry L. Fraser	
The Missing Corpse	June 1, 1945	Albert Herman	
Gangster's Den	June 14, 1945	Sam Newfield	
The Silver Fleet	July 1, 1945	Vernon Sewell	Made in Britain
Three in the Saddle	July 26, 1945	Harry L. Fraser	
Secrets of a Sorority Girl	August 14, 1945	Frank Wisbar	
Stagecoach Outlaws	August 17, 1945	Sam Newfield	
Dangerous Intruder	August 21, 1945	Vernon Keays	
Frontier Fugitives	September 1, 1945	Harry L. Fraser	
Rustlers' Hideout	September 2, 1945	Sam Newfield	
Arson Squad	September 11, 1945	Lew Landers	
Apology for Murder	September 27, 1945	Sam Newfield	
Shadow of Terror	October 5, 1945	Lew Landers	
Why Girls Leave Home	October 9, 1945	William Berke	
Border Badmen	October 10, 1945	Sam Newfield	
White Pongo	October 10, 1945	Sam Newfield	
Song of Old Wyoming	October 12, 1945	Robert Emmett Tansey	
Flaming Bullets	October 15, 1945	Harry L. Fraser	
Strange Holiday	October 19, 1945	Arch Oboler	
Fighting Bill Carson	October 31, 1945	Sam Newfield	
Prairie Rustlers	November 7, 1945	Sam Newfield	
Detour	November 16, 1945	Edgar G. Ulmer	
Navajo Kid	November 21, 1945	Harry L. Fraser	
Club Havana	November 23, 1945	Edgar G. Ulmer	
The Enchanted Forest	December 8, 1945	Lew Landers	
How Doooo You Do!!!	December 24, 1945	Ralph Murphy	

=== 1946 ===
Title	American Release Date	Director	Notes
Strangler of the Swamp	January 2, 1946	Frank Wisbar	
Lightning Raiders	January 7, 1946	Sam Newfield	
Danny Boy	January 8, 1946	Terry O. Morse	
The Flying Serpent	February 1, 1946	Sam Newfield	
Six Gun Man	February 1, 1946	Harry L. Fraser	
Ambush Trail	February 17, 1946	Harry L. Fraser	
I Ring Doorbells	February 28, 1946	Frank R. Strayer	
The Mask of Diijon	March 7, 1946	Lew Landers	
Murder Is My Business	March 7, 1946	Sam Newfield	
Romance of the West	March 20, 1946	Robert Emmett Tansey	
Gentlemen with Guns	March 27, 1946	Sam Newfield	
Thunder Town	April 12, 1946	Harry L. Fraser	
Devil Bat's Daughter	April 15, 1946	Frank Wisbar	
The Caravan Trail	April 20, 1946	Robert Emmett Tansey	
The Wife of Monte Cristo	April 23, 1946	Edgar G. Ulmer	
Terrors on Horseback	May 1, 1946	Sam Newfield	
Larceny in Her Heart	May 20, 1946	Sam Newfield	
Ghost of Hidden Valley	June 5, 1946	Sam Newfield	
Blonde for a Day	June 10, 1946	Sam Newfield	
Avalanche	June 30, 1946	Irving Allen	
Colorado Serenade	June 30, 1946	Robert Emmett Tansey	
Tumbleweed Trail	July 10, 1946	Robert Emmett Tansey	
Prairie Badmen	July 17, 1946	Sam Newfield	
Queen of Burlesque	July 24, 1946	Sam Newfield	
Down Missouri Way	August 15, 1946	Josef Berne	
Overland Riders	August 21, 1946	Sam Newfield	
Outlaws of the Plains	September 22, 1946	Sam Newfield	
Her Sister's Secret	September 23, 1946	Edgar G. Ulmer	
Accomplice	September 29, 1946	Walter Colmes	
The Brute Man	October 1, 1946	Jean Yarbrough	
Driftin' River	October 1, 1946	Robert Emmett Tansey	
Gas House Kids	October 9, 1946	Sam Newfield	
Don Ricardo Returns	November 5, 1946	Terry O. Morse	
Stars Over Texas	November 18, 1946	Robert Emmett Tansey	
Lady Chaser	November 25, 1946	Sam Newfield	
Wild West	December 1, 1946	Robert Emmett Tansey	

=== 1947 ===
Title	American Release Date	Director	Notes
Lighthouse	January 10, 1947	Frank Wisbar	
Born to Speed	January 12, 1947	Edward L. Cahn	
Wild Country	January 17, 1947	Ray Taylor	
The Devil on Wheels	February 15, 1947	Crane Wilbur	
Law of the Lash	February 28, 1947	Ray Taylor	
Range Beyond the Blue	March 17, 1947	Ray Taylor	
Untamed Fury	March 22, 1947	Ewing Scott	
Three on a Ticket	April 4, 1947	Sam Newfield	
Philo Vance's Gamble	April 12, 1947	Basil Wrangell	
West to Glory	April 12, 1947	Ray Taylor	
Philo Vance Returns	April 14, 1947	William Beaudine	
The Big Fix	April 19, 1947	James Flood	
Border Feud	May 10, 1947	Ray Taylor	
Too Many Winners	May 24, 1947	William Beaudine	
Killer at Large	May 31, 1947	William Beaudine	
Stepchild	June 7, 1947	James Flood	
Gas House Kids Go West	June 12, 1947	William Beaudine	
Heartaches	June 28, 1947	Basil Wrangell	
Pioneer Justice	June 28, 1947	Ray Taylor	
Ghost Town Renegades	July 12, 1947	Ray Taylor	
Gas House Kids in Hollywood	August 23, 1947	Edward L. Cahn	
Philo Vance's Secret Mission	August 30, 1947	Reginald LeBorg	
Stage to Mesa City	September 13, 1947	Ray Taylor	
Railroaded!	September 25, 1947	Anthony Mann	
Blonde Savage	October 3, 1947	Steve Sekely	
Return of the Lash	October 11, 1947	Ray Taylor	
Bury Me Dead	October 18, 1947	Bernard Vorhaus	
Black Hills	October 27, 1947	Ray Taylor	
The Fighting Vigilantes	November 15, 1947	Ray Taylor	
Shadow Valley	November 29, 1947	Ray Taylor	
Cheyenne Takes Over	December 17, 1947	Ray Taylor	

=== 1948 ===
Title	American Release Date	Director	Notes
Check Your Guns	January 24, 1948	Ray Taylor	
Tornado Range	February 21, 1948	Ray Taylor	
The Westward Trail	March 13, 1948	Ray Taylor	
The Hawk of Powder River	April 10, 1948	Ray Taylor	
The Tioga Kid	June 17, 1948	Ray Taylor	

== See also ==
- List of Grand National Pictures films
- List of Eagle-Lion Films
