= List of American films of 1943 =

More than 396 American feature films were released in 1943.

Casablanca won for Best Picture at the Academy Awards.

== A–B ==
Title	Director	Cast	Genre	Notes
Above Suspicion	Richard Thorpe	Joan Crawford, Fred MacMurray, Conrad Veidt	Spy	MGM
Action in the North Atlantic	Lloyd Bacon, Raoul Walsh	Humphrey Bogart, Raymond Massey, Alan Hale Sr.	War	Warner Bros.
Adventure in Iraq	D. Ross Lederman	Ruth Ford, John Loder, Paul Cavanagh	Adventure	Warner Bros.
The Adventures of a Rookie	Leslie Goodwins	Wally Brown, Alan Carney	Comedy	RKO
Aerial Gunner	William H. Pine	Chester Morris, Richard Arlen	War	Paramount
After Midnight with Boston Blackie	Lew Landers	Chester Morris, Ann Savage	Mystery	Columbia
Air Force	Howard Hawks	John Garfield, John Ridgely, Gig Young	Drama	Warner Bros.
Air Raid Wardens	Edward Sedgwick	Laurel and Hardy, Edgar Kennedy, Jacqueline White	Comedy	MGM
Alaska Highway	Frank McDonald	Jean Parker, Richard Arlen	Drama	Paramount
All by Myself	Felix E. Feist	Rosemary Lane, Evelyn Ankers, Patric Knowles	Comedy	Universal
Always a Bridesmaid	Erle C. Kenton	The Andrews Sisters, Patric Knowles, Grace McDonald	Musical comedy	Universal
The Amazing Mrs. Holliday	Bruce Manning	Deanna Durbin, Edmond O'Brien, Barry Fitzgerald	Comedy	Universal
The Ape Man	William Beaudine	Bela Lugosi, Louise Currie, Wallace Ford, Henry Hall	Science fiction	Monogram
Appointment in Berlin	Alfred E. Green	George Sanders, Marguerite Chapman	War drama	Columbia
Arizona Trail	Vernon Keays	Tex Ritter, Fuzzy Knight	Western	Universal
Around the World	Allan Dwan	Kay Kyser, Mischa Auer, Joan Davis	Musical comedy	RKO
Assignment in Brittany	Jack Conway	Jean-Pierre Aumont, Susan Peters, Signe Hasso	War	MGM
The Avenging Rider	Sam Nelson	Tim Holt, Cliff Edwards	Western	RKO
Background to Danger	Raoul Walsh	George Raft, Brenda Marshall, Sydney Greenstreet, Peter Lorre	Mystery	Warner Bros.
Bad Men of Thunder Gap	Albert Herman	Dave O'Brien, Guy Wilkerson	Western	PRC
Bar 20	Lesley Selander	William Boyd, Andy Clyde, George Reeves, Robert Mitchum	Western	United Artists
Bataan	Tay Garnett	Robert Taylor, George Murphy, Lloyd Nolan	War	MGM
Behind the Rising Sun	Edward Dmytryk	Margo Albert, Tom Neal	War	RKO
Best Foot Forward	Edward Buzzell	Lucille Ball, June Allyson, Gloria DeHaven, Nancy Walker	Musical comedy	MGM
Beyond the Last Frontier	Howard Bretherton	Eddie Dew, Smiley Burnette, Robert Mitchum	Western	Republic
The Black Hills Express	John English	Don "Red" Barry, Wally Vernon	Western	Republic
Black Market Rustlers	S. Roy Luby	Ray Corrigan, Max Terhune, Evelyn Finley	Western	Monogram
The Black Raven	Sam Newfield	Wanda McKay, George Zucco	Suspense	PRC
Blazing Frontier	Sam Newfield	Buster Crabbe, Al St. John	Western	PRC
Blazing Guns	Robert Emmett Tansey	Ken Maynard, Hoot Gibson	Western	Monogram
The Blocked Trail	Elmer Clifton	Bob Steele, Tom Tyler	Western	Republic
Bombardier	Richard Wallace	Pat O'Brien, Randolph Scott, Anne Shirley, Eddie Albert	War	RKO
Bomber's Moon	Edward Ludwig (as Charles Fuhr), Harold D. Schuster (as Charles Fuhr), John Brahm	George Montgomery, Annabella	War	20th Century Fox
Border Buckaroos	Oliver Drake	Dave O'Brien, Christine McIntyre	Western	PRC
Border Patrol	Lesley Selander	William Boyd, Andy Clyde, George Reeves, Robert Mitchum	Western	United Artists
Bordertown Gun Fighters	Howard Bretherton	Wild Bill Elliott, Anne Jeffreys	Western	Republic
Boss of Rawhide	Elmer Clifton	Dave O'Brien, Nell O'Day	Western	PRC
The Boy from Stalingrad	Sidney Salkow	Scotty Beckett, John Wengraf	War	Columbia
Buckskin Frontier	Lesley Selander	Richard Dix, Jane Wyatt, Lee J. Cobb	Western	United Artists
Bullets and Saddles	Anthony Marshall	Ray "Crash" Corrigan, Julie Duncan	Western	Monogram

== C–D ==
Title	Director	Cast	Genre	Notes
Cabin in the Sky	Vincente Minnelli	Ethel Waters, Eddie "Rochester" Anderson, Lena Horne, Louis Armstrong	Musical comedy	MGM
Calaboose	Hal Roach Jr.	Jimmy Rogers, Noah Beery Jr.	Western	United Artists
California Joe	Spencer Bennet	Don "Red" Barry, Helen Talbot	Western	Republic
Calling Dr. Death	Reginald LeBorg	Lon Chaney Jr., Patricia Morison	Mystery	Universal
Calling Wild Bill Elliott	Spencer Gordon Bennet	Wild Bill Elliott, Anne Jeffreys	Western	Republic
Campus Rhythm	Arthur Dreifuss	Johnny Downs, Gale Storm	Musical	Monogram
Canyon City	Spencer Gordon Bennet	Don "Red" Barry, Helen Talbot	Western	Republic
Captive Wild Woman	Edward Dmytryk	John Carradine, Milburn Stone, Paula Dupree	Science fiction	Universal
Carson City Cyclone	Howard Bretherton	Don "Red" Barry, Lynn Merrick	Western	Republic
Cattle Stampede	Sam Newfield	Buster Crabbe, Al St. John	Western	PRC
The Chance of a Lifetime	William Castle	Chester Morris, Erik Rolf, Jeanne Bates	Crime drama	Columbia
Chatterbox	Joseph Santley	Joe E. Brown, Judy Canova	Comedy	Republic
Chetniks! The Fighting Guerrillas	Louis King	Anna Sten, Philip Dorn	War	20th Century Fox
Cheyenne Roundup	Ray Taylor	Johnny Mack Brown, Jennifer Holt	Western	Universal
China	John Farrow	Loretta Young, Alan Ladd, William Bendix	Drama	Paramount
Cinderella Swings It	Christy Cabanne	Gloria Warren, Guy Kibbee, Helen Parrish	Musical	RKO
City Without Men	Sidney Salkow	Linda Darnell, Glenda Farrell	Crime drama	Columbia
Clancy Street Boys	William Beaudine	East Side Kids, Amelita Ward, Noah Beery	Comedy	Monogram
Claudia	Edmund Goulding	Dorothy McGuire, Robert Young, Ina Claire	Comedy	20th Century Fox
Colt Comrades	Lesley Selander	William Boyd, Andy Clyde	Western	United Artists
Coney Island	Walter Lang	Betty Grable, George Montgomery, Cesar Romero, Phil Silvers	Musical	20th Century Fox
The Constant Nymph	Edmund Goulding	Charles Boyer, Joan Fontaine, Peter Lorre	Drama	Warner Bros.
Corregidor	William Nigh	Otto Kruger, Elissa Landi, Donald Woods	War	PRC
Corvette K-225	Richard Rosson	Randolph Scott, Ella Raines	Drama	Universal
Cowboy Commandos	S. Roy Luby	Ray Corrigan, Max Terhune, Evelyn Finley	Western	Monogram
Cowboy in Manhattan	Frank Woodruff	Frances Langford, Robert Paige, Leon Errol	Comedy	Universal
Cowboy in the Clouds	Benjamin H. Kline	Charles Starrett, Dub Taylor	Western	Columbia
Crash Dive	Archie Mayo	Tyrone Power, Dana Andrews, Anne Baxter	War	20th Century Fox
Crazy House	Edward F. Cline	Olsen and Johnson, Cass Daley	Comedy	Universal
Crime Doctor	Michael Gordon	Warner Baxter, Ray Collins	Mystery	Columbia
The Crime Doctor's Strangest Case	Eugene Forde	Warner Baxter, Gloria Dickson	Mystery	Columbia; Crime Doctor series
The Crime Smasher	James Tinling	Richard Cromwell, Gale Storm	Mystery	Monogram
The Cross of Lorraine	Tay Garnett	Jean-Pierre Aumont, Gene Kelly, Cedric Hardwicke	War	MGM
Cry "Havoc"	Richard Thorpe	Margaret Sullavan, Ann Sothern, Joan Blondell, Fay Bainter	Drama	MGM
The Crystal Ball	Elliott Nugent	Paulette Goddard, Ray Milland	Comedy	United Artists
The Dancing Masters	Malcolm St. Clair	Laurel and Hardy, Trudy Marshall	Comedy	20th Century Fox
Danger! Women at Work	Sam Newfield	Patsy Kelly, Mary Brian, Isabel Jewell	Comedy	PRC
Dangerous Blondes	Leigh Jason	Evelyn Keyes, Anita Louise	Mystery	Columbia
Days of Old Cheyenne	Elmer Clifton	Don "Red" Barry, Lynn Merrick	Western	Republic
Dead Man's Gulch	John English	Don "Red" Barry, Lynn Merrick	Western	Republic
Dead Men Walk	Sam Newfield	George Zucco, Mary Carlisle	Horror	PRC
Death Rides the Plains	Sam Newfield	Robert Livingston, Al St. John	Western	PRC
Death Valley Manhunt	John English	Wild Bill Elliott, Anne Jeffreys	Western	Republic
Death Valley Rangers	Robert Emmett Tansey	Ken Maynard, Hoot Gibson, Bob Steele	Western	Monogram
Deerslayer	Lew Landers	Jean Parker, Larry Parks, Yvonne DeCarlo	Western	Republic
The Desert Song	Robert Florey	Dennis Morgan, Irene Manning	Musical	Warner Bros.
The Desperadoes	Charles Vidor	Randolph Scott, Claire Trevor, Glenn Ford	Western	Columbia
Destination Tokyo	Delmer Daves	Cary Grant, John Garfield	War	Warner Bros.
Destroyer	William A. Seiter	Glenn Ford, Edward G. Robinson	War	Columbia
Devil Riders	Sam Newfield	Buster Crabbe, Patti McCarty	Western	PRC
Dixie	A. Edward Sutherland	Bing Crosby, Dorothy Lamour	Musical	Paramount
Dixie Dugan	Otto Brower	Lois Andrews, James Ellison, Charlotte Greenwood	Comedy	20th Century Fox
Doughboys in Ireland	Lew Landers	Kenny Baker, Jeff Donnell, Lynn Merrick	Musical	Columbia
Dr. Gillespie's Criminal Case	Willis Goldbeck	Lionel Barrymore, Van Johnson, Margaret O'Brien	Drama	MGM
DuBarry Was a Lady	Roy Del Ruth	Red Skelton, Lucille Ball, Gene Kelly	Musical	MGM

== E–F ==
Title	Director	Cast	Genre	Notes
Edge of Darkness	Lewis Milestone	Errol Flynn, Ann Sheridan, Walter Huston	War	Warner Bros.
The Falcon and the Co-eds	William Clemens	Tom Conway, Amelita Ward	Mystery	RKO
The Falcon in Danger	William Clemens	Tom Conway, Jean Brooks	Mystery	RKO
The Falcon Strikes Back	Edward Dmytryk	Tom Conway, Harriet Hilliard	Mystery	RKO
The Fallen Sparrow	Richard Wallace	Maureen O'Hara, John Garfield, Walter Slezak, Patricia Morison	Drama	RKO
False Colors	George Archainbaud	William Boyd, Andy Clyde	Western	United Artists
False Faces	George Sherman	Stanley Ridges, Veda Ann Borg	Mystery	Republic
The Fighting Buckaroo	William Berke	Charles Starrett, Arthur Hunnicutt	Western	Columbia
Fighting Frontier	Lambert Hillyer	Tim Holt, Cliff Edwards	Western	RKO
Fighting Valley	Oliver Drake	Dave O'Brien, Guy Wilkerson	Western	PRC
Find the Blackmailer	D. Ross Lederman	Faye Emerson, Gene Lockhart	Mystery	Warner Bros.
Fired Wife	Charles Lamont	Diana Barrymore, Louise Allbritton	Comedy	Universal
First Comes Courage	Dorothy Arzner	Merle Oberon, Brian Aherne	Drama	Columbia
Five Graves to Cairo	Billy Wilder	Franchot Tone, Anne Baxter	War	Paramount
Flesh and Fantasy	Julien Duvivier	Edward G. Robinson, Charles Boyer, Barbara Stanwyck, Betty Field	Drama anthology	Universal
Flight for Freedom	Lothar Mendes	Rosalind Russell, Fred MacMurray, Herbert Marshall	Drama	RKO
Follies Girl	William Rowland	Doris Nolan, Wendy Barrie	Musical	PRC
Follow the Band	Jean Yarbrough	Mary Beth Hughes, Eddie Quillan	Musical	Universal
Footlight Glamour	Frank R. Strayer	Penny Singleton, Arthur Lake, Ann Savage	Comedy	Columbia
For Whom the Bell Tolls	Sam Wood	Gary Cooper, Ingrid Bergman, Arturo de Córdova	War	Paramount; from novel by Ernest Hemingway
Forever and a Day	René Clair, Edmund Goulding	Brian Aherne, Robert Cummings, Charles Laughton, Ida Lupino	Drama	RKO
Frankenstein Meets the Wolf Man	Roy William Neill	Lon Chaney Jr., Bela Lugosi	Horror	Universal
Frontier Badmen	Ford Beebe	Diana Barrymore, Noah Beery Jr.	Western	Universal
Frontier Fury	William Berke	Charles Starrett, Arthur Hunnicutt	Western	Columbia
Frontier Law	Elmer Clifton	Russell Hayden, Jennifer Holt	Western	Columbia
Fugitive from Sonora	Howard Bretherton	Don "Red" Barry, Lynn Merrick	Western	Republic
Fugitive of the Plains	Sam Newfield	Buster Crabbe, Kermit Maynard	Western	PRC

== G–H ==
Title	Director	Cast	Genre	Notes
Gals, Incorporated	Leslie Goodwins	Leon Errol, Harriet Nelson, Grace McDonald	Musical comedy	Universal
The Gang's All Here	Busby Berkeley	Alice Faye, Carmen Miranda	Musical	20th Century Fox
Gangway for Tomorrow	John H. Auer	John Carradine, Robert Ryan, Margo Albert	Drama	RKO
A Gentle Gangster	Phil Rosen	Molly Lamont, Barton MacLane	Drama	Republic
Get Going	Jean Yarbrough	Robert Paige, Grace McDonald, Barbara Jo Allen	Comedy	Universal
Government Girl	Dudley Nichols	Olivia de Havilland, Sonny Tufts	Comedy	Warner Bros.
The Ghost and the Guest	William Nigh	Florence Rice, James Dunn	Comedy	PRC
The Ghost Rider	Wallace Fox	Johnny Mack Brown, Raymond Hatton	Western	Monogram
The Ghost Ship	Mark Robson	Richard Dix, Edith Barrett	Drama	RKO
Ghosts on the Loose	William Beaudine	East Side Kids, Bela Lugosi, Ava Gardner	Horror comedy	Monogram
Gildersleeve's Bad Day	Gordon Douglas	Harold Peary, Nancy Gates	Comedy	RKO
Gildersleeve on Broadway	Gordon Douglas	Harold Peary, Billie Burke	Comedy	RKO
Girl Crazy	Norman Taurog	Mickey Rooney, Judy Garland	Musical	MGM; music by George and Ira Gershwin
The Girl from Monterrey	Wallace Fox	Armida Vendrell, Veda Ann Borg	Comedy	PRC
Girls in Chains	Edgar G. Ulmer	Arline Judge, Roger Clark	Drama	PRC
The Good Fellows	Jo Graham	Cecil Kellaway, Mabel Paige	Comedy	Paramount
Good Luck, Mr. Yates	Ray Enright	Claire Trevor, Jess Barker	War drama	Columbia
Good Morning, Judge	Jean Yarbrough	Dennis O'Keefe, Mary Beth Hughes	Comedy	Universal
The Gorilla Man	D. Ross Lederman	Ruth Ford, John Loder	Drama	Warner Bros.
Government Girl	Dudley Nichols	Olivia de Havilland, Sonny Tufts, Anne Shirley	Comedy	RKO
Guadalcanal Diary	Lewis Seiler	William Bendix, Richard Conte, Anthony Quinn	War	20th Century Fox
Gung Ho!	Ray Enright	Randolph Scott, Robert Mitchum	War	Universal
A Guy Named Joe	Victor Fleming	Spencer Tracy, Irene Dunne, Van Johnson	Romantic fantasy	MGM; remade in 1989
Hail to the Rangers	William Berke	Charles Starrett, Arthur Hunnicutt	Western	Columbia
Hangmen Also Die!	Fritz Lang	Hans Heinrich von Twardowski, Brian Donlevy, Walter Brennan	War	United Artists
Happy Go Lucky	Curtis Bernhardt	Mary Martin, Betty Hutton	Comedy	Paramount
Happy Land	Irving Pichel	Don Ameche, Frances Dee	Drama	20th Century Fox
The Hard Way	Vincent Sherman	Ida Lupino, Joan Leslie	Drama	Warner Bros.
Harrigan's Kid	Charles Reisner	Frank Craven, William Gargan	Drama	MGM
Harvest Melody	Sam Newfield	Rosemary Lane, Johnny Downs, Charlotte Wynters	Musical	PRC
Haunted Ranch	Robert Emmett Tansey	John 'Dusty' King, Dave Sharpe	Western	Monogram
Headin' for God's Country	William Morgan	William Lundigan, Virginia Dale	Action	Republic
The Heat's On	Gregory Ratoff	Mae West, Victor Moore	Musical comedy	Columbia
Heaven Can Wait	Ernst Lubitsch	Don Ameche, Gene Tierney	Comedy	20th Century Fox; Remade in 1978
He Hired the Boss	Thomas Z. Loring	Stuart Erwin, Evelyn Venable, Vivian Blaine	Comedy	20th Century Fox
He's My Guy	Edward F. Cline	Dick Foran, Irene Hervey, Joan Davis	Musical	Columbia
Hello, Frisco, Hello	H. Bruce Humberstone	Alice Faye, John Payne, Jack Oakie	Musical	20th Century Fox
Henry Aldrich Gets Glamour	Hugh Bennett	Jimmy Lydon, Olive Blakeney	Comedy	Paramount
Henry Aldrich Haunts a House	Hugh Bennett	Jimmy Lydon, Olive Blakeney	Comedy	Paramount
Henry Aldrich Swings It	Hugh Bennett	Jimmy Lydon, John Litel, Olive Blakeney	Comedy	Paramount
Here Comes Elmer	Joseph Santley	Al Pearce, Dale Evans, Gloria Stuart	Comedy	Republic
Here Comes Kelly	William Beaudine	Eddie Quillan, Joan Woodbury, Armida	Comedy	Monogram
Hers to Hold	Frank Ryan	Deanna Durbin, Joseph Cotten	Romance	Universal
Hi, Buddy	Harold Young	Dick Foran, Harriet Nelson, Marjorie Lord	Musical	Universal
Hi Diddle Diddle	Andrew L. Stone	Adolphe Menjou, Martha Scott, Dennis O'Keefe	Comedy	United Artists
High Explosive	Frank McDonald	Jean Parker, Chester Morris	Drama	Paramount
His Butler's Sister	Frank Borzage	Deanna Durbin, Franchot Tone	Comedy	Universal
Hit Parade of 1943	Albert S. Rogell	Susan Hayward, Gail Patrick, Eve Arden	Musical	Republic
Hit the Ice	Charles Lamont	Abbott and Costello, Ginny Simms, Patric Knowles	Comedy	Universal
Hitler's Children	Edward Dmytryk	Tim Holt, Bonita Granville, Kent Smith	Propaganda	RKO
Hitler's Madman	Douglas Sirk	Patricia Morison, Alan Curtis	Drama	PRC
Hi'ya, Chum	Harold Young	Ritz Brothers, Jane Frazee	Comedy	Universal
Hi'ya, Sailor	Jean Yarbrough	Donald Woods, Elyse Knox	Musical comedy	Universal
Holy Matrimony	John M. Stahl	Monty Woolley, Gracie Fields	Comedy	20th Century Fox
Honeymoon Lodge	Edward C. Lilley	David Bruce, Harriet Hilliard, June Vincent	Musical comedy	Universal
Hoosier Holiday	Frank McDonald	Dale Evans, Isabel Randolph	Comedy	Republic
Hoppy Serves a Writ	George Archainbaud	William Boyd, George Reeves, Robert Mitchum	Western	United Artists; Hopalong Cassidy
Hostages	Frank Tuttle	Luise Rainer, William Bendix	War	Paramount
How's About It	Erle C. Kenton	The Andrews Sisters, Grace McDonald	Musical	Universal
The Human Comedy	Clarence Brown	Mickey Rooney	Comedy-Drama	MGM

== I–J ==
Title	Director	Cast	Genre	Notes
I Dood It	Vincente Minnelli	Red Skelton, Eleanor Powell	Musical comedy	MGM
I Escaped from the Gestapo	Harold Young	Dean Jagger, John Carradine, Mary Brian	Thriller	Monogram
I Walked with a Zombie	Jacques Tourneur	Frances Dee, Tom Conway	Horror	RKO
Idaho	Joseph Kane	Roy Rogers, Virginia Grey	Western	Republic
Immortal Sergeant	John M. Stahl	Henry Fonda, Maureen O'Hara	War	20th Century Fox
In Old Oklahoma	Albert S. Rogell	John Wayne, Martha Scott, Dale Evans	Western	Republic
The Iron Major	Ray Enright	Pat O'Brien, Ruth Warrick	Biography	RKO
Is Everybody Happy?	Charles Barton	Ted Lewis, Larry Parks	Musical	Columbia
Isle of Forgotten Sins	Edgar G. Ulmer	Gale Sondergaard, John Carradine	Adventure	PRC
It Ain't Hay	Erle C. Kenton	Abbott and Costello, Grace McDonald	Comedy	Universal
It Comes Up Love	Charles Lamont	Gloria Jean, Donald O'Connor, Ian Hunter	Musical comedy	Universal
It's a Great Life	Frank R. Strayer	Penny Singleton, Arthur Lake	Comedy	Columbia; Blondie series
Jack London	Alfred Santell	Michael O'Shea, Susan Hayward	Biography	United Artists
Jane Eyre	Robert Stevenson	Orson Welles, Joan Fontaine	Drama	Fox; from novel by Charlotte Brontë
Jitterbugs	Malcolm St. Clair	Laurel and Hardy, Vivian Blaine	Comedy	20th Century Fox
Jive Junction	Edgar G. Ulmer	Dickie Moore, Tina Thayer	Musical	PRC
Johnny Come Lately	William K. Howard	James Cagney, Marjorie Lord	Drama	United Artists
Journey into Fear	Norman Foster, Orson Welles	Joseph Cotten, Dolores del Río, Orson Welles	Thriller	RKO

== K–L ==
Title	Director	Cast	Genre	Notes
The Kansan	George Archainbaud	Richard Dix, Jane Wyatt, Albert Dekker	Western	United Artists
Keep 'Em Slugging	Christy Cabanne	Dead End Kids, Elyse Knox	Comedy	Universal
Keeper of the Flame	George Cukor	Katharine Hepburn, Spencer Tracy	Drama	MGM
Kid Dynamite	Wallace Fox	Leo Gorcey, Huntz Hall, Pamela Blake	Comedy	Monogram
The Kid Rides Again	Sam Newfield	Buster Crabbe, Iris Meredith	Western	PRC
King of the Cowboys	Joseph Kane	Roy Rogers, Peggy Moran	Western	Republic
Klondike Kate	William Castle	Ann Savage, Tom Neal, Glenda Farrell	Western	Columbia
Ladies' Day	Leslie Goodwins	Lupe Vélez, Eddie Albert	Comedy	RKO
Lady Bodyguard	William Clemens	Eddie Albert, Anne Shirley	Comedy	Paramount
Lady of Burlesque	William A. Wellman	Barbara Stanwyck, Michael O'Shea	Comedy mystery	United Artists
A Lady Takes a Chance	William A. Seiter	Jean Arthur, John Wayne, Phil Silvers	Romantic comedy	RKO
Land of Hunted Men	S. Roy Luby	Ray Corrigan, Max Terhune	Western	Monogram
Larceny with Music	Edward Lilley	Kitty Carlisle, Allan Jones, Lee Patrick	Musical	Universal
Lassie Come Home	Fred M. Wilcox	Roddy McDowall, Donald Crisp, May Whitty	Family	MGM
Law of the Northwest	William Berke	Charles Starrett, Shirley Patterson	Western	Columbia
Law of the Saddle	Melville De Lay	Robert Livingston, Al St. John	Western	PRC
The Law Rides Again	Alan James	Ken Maynard, Hoot Gibson	Western	Monogram
The Leather Burners	Joseph Henabery	William Boyd, Andy Clyde	Western	United Artists
The Leopard Man	Jacques Tourneur	Dennis O'Keefe, Margo, Jean Brooks	Horror	RKO
Let's Face It	Sidney Lanfield	Betty Hutton, Bob Hope	Comedy	Paramount
Let's Have Fun	Charles Barton	Bert Gordon, Margaret Lindsay	Musical comedy	Columbia
London Blackout Murders	George Sherman	John Abbott, Anita Bolster	Drama	Republic
The Lone Star Trail	Ray Taylor	Johnny Mack Brown, Tex Ritter	Western	Universal
Lost Angel	Roy Rowland	Margaret O'Brien, Marsha Hunt	Drama	MGM

== M–N ==
Title	Director	Cast	Genre	Notes
The Mad Ghoul	James P. Hogan	George Zucco, Evelyn Ankers, Robert Armstrong	Horror	Universal
Madame Curie	Mervyn LeRoy	Greer Garson, Walter Pidgeon, Henry Travers	Biography	MGM; 7 Academy Award nominations
The Man from Down Under	Robert Z. Leonard	Charles Laughton, Donna Reed	Drama	MGM
The Man from Music Mountain	Joseph Kane	Roy Rogers, Ann Gillis	Western	Republic
The Man from the Rio Grande	Howard Bretherton	Don "Red" Barry, Wally Vernon	Western	Republic
The Man from Thunder River	John English	Wild Bill Elliott, Anne Jeffreys	Western	Republic
Man of Courage	Alexis Thurn-Taxis	Barton MacLane, Charlotte Wynters, Lyle Talbot	Crime	PRC
The Mantrap	George Sherman	Henry Stephenson, Lloyd Corrigan, Dorothy Lovett	Mystery	Republic
Margin for Error	Otto Preminger	Joan Bennett, Milton Berle, Otto Preminger	Drama	20th Century Fox
The Meanest Man in the World	Sidney Lanfield	Jack Benny, Priscilla Lane	Comedy	20th Century Fox
Melody Parade	Arthur Dreifuss	Mary Beth Hughes, Eddie Quillan	Musical	Monogram
Mexican Spitfire's Blessed Event	Leslie Goodwins	Lupe Vélez, Leon Errol	Comedy	RKO; last of series
Minesweeper	William Berke	Richard Arlen, Jean Parker	War drama	Paramount
Mission to Moscow	Michael Curtiz	Walter Huston, Ann Harding, Oskar Homolka	War drama	Warner Bros.
Mister Big	Charles Lamont	Donald O'Connor, Gloria Jean, Peggy Ryan	Musical	Universal
The Moon Is Down	Irving Pichel	Cedric Hardwicke, Lee J. Cobb	War	20th Century Fox
Moonlight in Vermont	Edward C. Lilley	Gloria Jean, Fay Helm	Musical	Universal
The More the Merrier	George Stevens	Jean Arthur, Joel McCrea, Charles Coburn	Comedy	Columbia
Mountain Rhythm	Frank McDonald	Sally Payne, Weaver Brothers	Comedy	Republic
Mr. Lucky	H. C. Potter	Cary Grant, Laraine Day	Romance	RKO
Mr. Muggs Steps Out	William Beaudine	Leo Gorcey, Huntz Hall, Joan Marsh	Comedy	Monogram
Murder in Times Square	Lew Landers	Edmund Lowe, Marguerite Chapman	Mystery	Columbia
Murder on the Waterfront	B. Reeves Easton	Warren Douglas, Ruth Ford	Drama	Warner Bros.
My Friend Flicka	Harold D. Schuster	Roddy McDowall, Preston Foster, Rita Johnson	Family	20th Century Fox
My Kingdom for a Cook	Richard Wallace	Charles Coburn, Marguerite Chapman	Comedy	Columbia
My Son, the Hero	Edgar G. Ulmer	Patsy Kelly, Roscoe Karns	Comedy	PRC
The Mystery of the 13th Guest	William Beaudine	Helen Parrish, Dick Purcell	Crime	Monogram
The Mysterious Doctor	Benjamin Stoloff	Eleanor Parker, John Loder	Drama	Warner Bros.
Mystery Broadcast	George Sherman	Ruth Terry, Frank Albertson	Suspense	Republic
Nearly Eighteen	Arthur Dreifuss	Gale Storm, Rick Vallin	Comedy	Monogram
Never a Dull Moment	Edward C. Lilley	Ritz Brothers, Frances Langford, Mary Beth Hughes	Comedy	Universal
A Night for Crime	Alexis Thurn-Taxis	Glenda Farrell, Lyle Talbot, Lina Basquette	Mystery	PRC
Night Plane from Chungking	Ralph Murphy	Robert Preston, Ellen Drew	War	Paramount
Nobody's Darling	Anthony Mann	Mary Lee, Louis Calhern	Musical	Republic
No Place for a Lady	James P. Hogan	William Gargan, Phyllis Brooks	Mystery	Columbia
No Time for Love	Mitchell Leisen	Claudette Colbert, Fred MacMurray	Comedy	Paramount
The North Star	Lewis Milestone	Anne Baxter, Dana Andrews, Walter Huston, Walter Brennan	War	RKO
Northern Pursuit	Raoul Walsh	Errol Flynn, Julie Bishop	War	Warner Bros.

== O–R ==
Title	Director	Cast	Genre	Notes
Old Acquaintance	Vincent Sherman	Bette Davis, Miriam Hopkins	Drama	Warner Bros.
O, My Darling Clementine	Frank McDonald	Roy Acuff, Isabel Randolph	Musical	Republic
One Dangerous Night	Michael Gordon	Warren William, Marguerite Chapman	Mystery	Columbia
The Outlaw	Howard Hughes	Jane Russell, Jack Buetel, Walter Huston	Western	United Artists
Outlaws of Stampede Pass	Wallace Fox	Johnny Mack Brown, Raymond Hatton	Western	Monogram
Overland Mail Robbery	John English	Wild Bill Elliott, Anne Jeffreys	Western	Republic
The Ox-Bow Incident	William A. Wellman	Henry Fonda, Dana Andrews, Mary Beth Hughes, Anthony Quinn	Western	20th Century Fox
Paris After Dark	Léonide Moguy	George Sanders, Brenda Marshall	War drama	20th Century Fox
Passport to Suez	André de Toth	Warren William, Ann Savage	Mystery	Columbia
Petticoat Larceny	Ben Holmes	Ruth Warrick, Joan Carroll	Comedy	RKO
Phantom of the Opera	Arthur Lubin	Nelson Eddy, Susanna Foster, Claude Rains	Horror musical	Universal
Pilot No. 5	George Sidney	Gene Kelly, Franchot Tone, Van Johnson, Marsha Hunt	War	MGM
Pistol Packin' Mama	Frank Woodruff	Ruth Terry, Robert Livingston	Comedy	Republic
Power of the Press	Samuel Fuller	Guy Kibbee, Gloria Dickson, Lee Tracy	Drama	Columbia
The Powers Girl	Norman Z. McLeod	Carole Landis, Anne Shirley, George Murphy, Benny Goodman, Peggy Lee	Musical comedy	United Artists
Prairie Chickens	Hal Roach Jr.	Jimmy Rogers, Noah Beery Jr.	Western	United Artists
Presenting Lily Mars	Norman Taurog	Judy Garland, Van Heflin	Musical	MGM
Princess O'Rourke	Norman Krasna	Olivia de Havilland, Robert Cummings, Charles Coburn	Romantic comedy	Warner Bros; Academy Award for screenplay
The Purple V	George Sherman	John Archer, Peter Lawford	Drama	Republic
Raiders of Red Gap	Sam Newfield	Robert Livingston, Myrna Dell	Western	PRC
Raiders of San Joaquin	Lewis D. Collins	Johnny Mack Brown, Jennifer Holt	Western	Universal
Raiders of Sunset Pass	John English	Eddie Dew, Jennifer Holt	Western	Republic
Redhead from Manhattan	Lew Landers	Lupe Vélez	Comedy	Columbia
The Renegade	Sam Newfield	Buster Crabbe, Al St. John	Western	PRC
The Return of the Rangers	Elmer Clifton	Dave O'Brien, Guy Wilkerson, Nell O'Day	Western	PRC
The Return of the Vampire	Lew Landers	Bela Lugosi, Nina Foch	Horror	Columbia
Reveille with Beverly	Charles Barton	Ann Miller, Franklin Pangborn, Larry Parks	Comedy	Columbia
Revenge of the Zombies	Steve Sekely	Gale Storm, John Carradine	Horror	Monogram
Rhythm of the Islands	Roy William Neill	Jane Frazee, Allan Jones	Comedy	Universal
Riders of the Deadline	Lesley Selander	William Boyd, Robert Mitchum	Western	United Artists
Riders of the Northwest Mounted	William Berke	Russell Hayden, Dub Taylor	Western	Columbia
Riders of the Rio Grande	Howard Bretherton	Bob Steele, Tom Tyler	Western	Republic
Riding High	George Marshall	Dorothy Lamour, Dick Powell	Comedy	Paramount
Robin Hood of the Range	William Berke	Charles Starrett, Arthur Hunnicutt	Western	Columbia
Rookies in Burma	Leslie Goodwins	Wally Brown, Alan Carney	War comedy	RKO

== S ==
Title	Director	Cast	Genre	Notes
Saddles and Sagebrush	William Berke	Russell Hayden, Ann Savage	Western	Columbia
Sagebrush Law	Sam Nelson	Tim Holt, Joan Barclay	Western	RKO
Sahara	Zoltan Korda	Humphrey Bogart	Action; War	Columbia
The Saint Meets the Tiger	Paul L. Stein	Hugh Sinclair, Jean Gillie	Mystery	Republic; last of series
Salute to the Marines	S. Sylvan Simon	Wallace Beery, Fay Bainter	War drama, propaganda	MGM
Salute for Three	Ralph Murphy	Betty Jane Rhodes, Macdonald Carey	Musical	Paramount
Santa Fe Scouts	Howard Bretherton	Bob Steele, Tom Tyler, Lois Collier	Western	Republic
Sarong Girl	Arthur Dreifuss	Ann Corio, Tim Ryan, Irene Ryan	Musical comedy	Monogram
A Scream in the Dark	George Sherman	Robert Lowery, Marie McDonald	Suspense	Republic
The Seventh Victim	Mark Robson	Tom Conway, Jean Brooks, Isabel Jewell, Kim Hunter, Hugh Beaumont	Horror	RKO
Shadow of a Doubt	Alfred Hitchcock	Teresa Wright, Joseph Cotten, Macdonald Carey, Hume Cronyn	Film noir	Universal
Shantytown	Joseph Santley	Mary Lee, Marjorie Lord	Crime	Republic
She Has What It Takes	Charles Barton	Jinx Falkenburg, Tom Neal, Constance Worth	Musical	Columbia
She's for Me	Reginald LeBorg	Grace McDonald, David Bruce	Musical	Universal
Sherlock Holmes Faces Death	Roy William Neill	Basil Rathbone, Nigel Bruce, Hillary Brooke	Mystery	Universal
Sherlock Holmes and the Secret Weapon	Roy William Neill	Basil Rathbone, Nigel Bruce	Mystery	Universal
Sherlock Holmes in Washington	Roy William Neill	Basil Rathbone, Nigel Bruce	Mystery	Universal
Silent Witness	Jean Yarbrough	Frank Albertson, Maris Wrixon	Crime	Monogram
Silver City Raiders	William Berke	Russell Hayden, Dub Taylor	Western	Columbia
Silver Skates	Leslie Goodwins	Kenny Baker, Belita, Patricia Morison	Musical	Monogram
Silver Spurs	Joseph Kane	Roy Rogers, Phyllis Brooks	Western	Republic
Six Gun Gospel	Lambert Hillyer	Johnny Mack Brown, Raymond Hatton	Western	Monogram
The Sky's the Limit	Edward H. Griffith	Fred Astaire, Joan Leslie, Robert Benchley, Robert Ryan	Musical Comedy	RKO
Sleepy Lagoon	Joseph Santley	Judy Canova, Dennis Day	Comedy	Republic
Slightly Dangerous	Wesley Ruggles	Lana Turner, Robert Young	Comedy	MGM
Smart Guy	Lambert Hillyer	Rick Vallin, Veda Ann Borg	Crime	Monogram
So Proudly We Hail!	Mark Sandrich	Claudette Colbert, Paulette Goddard, George Reeves, Veronica Lake	Drama	Paramount
Someone to Remember	Robert Siodmak	Mabel Paige, Harry Shannon	Drama	Republic
Something to Shout About	Gregory Ratoff	Don Ameche, Janet Blair	Comedy	20th Century Fox
Son of Dracula	Robert Siodmak	Lon Chaney Jr., Evelyn Ankers	Horror	Universal
The Song of Bernadette	Henry King	Jennifer Jones	Biography	20th Century Fox; Academy Award for Jones
Song of Texas	Joseph Kane	Roy Rogers, Sheila Ryan	Western	Republic
So This Is Washington	Ray McCarey	Lum and Abner, Mildred Coles	Comedy	RKO
So's Your Uncle	Jean Yarbrough	Billie Burke, Donald Woods	Comedy	Universal
Spotlight Scandals	William Beaudine	Billy Gilbert, Iris Adrian	Musical	Monogram
Spy Train	Harold Young	Richard Travis, Catherine Craig	Thriller	Monogram
Stage Door Canteen	Frank Borzage	Cheryl Walker, Lon McCallister, many cameos	Musical	United Artists
Stormy Weather	Andrew L. Stone	Lena Horne, Bill Robinson, Dooley Wilson	Musical	20th Century Fox
The Strange Death of Adolf Hitler	James P. Hogan	Ludwig Donath, Gale Sondergaard	War drama	Universal
The Stranger from Pecos	Lambert Hillyer	Johnny Mack Brown, Raymond Hatton, Christine McIntyre	Western	Monogram
A Stranger in Town	Roy Rowland	Frank Morgan, Jean Rogers	Drama/comedy	MGM
Submarine Alert	Frank McDonald	Richard Arlen, Wendy Barrie	Action	Paramount
Submarine Base	Albert H. Kelley	Alan Baxter, John Litel	War	PRC
The Sultan's Daughter	Arthur Dreifuss	Ann Corio, Charles Butterworth	Comedy	Monogram
Sweet Rosie O'Grady	Irving Cummings	Betty Grable, Robert Young	Musical	20th Century Fox
Swing Fever	Tim Whelan	Kay Kyser, Marilyn Maxwell, Lena Horne	Musical	MGM
Swing Out the Blues	Malcolm St. Clair	Bob Haymes, Lynn Merrick, Janis Carter	Musical	Columbia
Swing Shift Maisie	Norman Z. McLeod	Ann Sothern, James Craig	Comedy	MGM
Swing Your Partner	Frank McDonald	Myrtle Wiseman, Dale Evans	Musical	Republic

== T ==
Title	Director	Cast	Genre	Notes
Tahiti Honey	John H. Auer	Simone Simon, Dennis O'Keefe	Musical	Republic
Tarzan's Desert Mystery	Wilhelm Thiele	Johnny Weissmuller, Nancy Kelly	Adventure	RKO
Tarzan Triumphs	Wilhelm Thiele	Johnny Weissmuller, Frances Gifford	Adventure	RKO
Taxi, Mister	Kurt Neumann	William Bendix, Grace Bradley	Comedy	United Artists
Tender Comrade	Edward Dmytryk	Ginger Rogers, Robert Ryan	Drama	RKO
Tenting Tonight on the Old Camp Ground	Lewis D. Collins	Johnny Mack Brown, Jennifer Holt	Western	Universal
The Texas Kid	Lambert Hillyer	Johnny Mack Brown, Raymond Hatton	Western	Monogram
Thank Your Lucky Stars	David Butler	Dennis Morgan, Joan Leslie	Musical	Warner Bros.
That Nazty Nuisance	Glenn Tryon	Bobby Watson, Jean Porter	Comedy	United Artists
There's Something About a Soldier	Alfred E. Green	Tom Neal, Evelyn Keyes	War drama	Columbia
They Came to Blow Up America	Edward Ludwig	George Sanders, Anna Sten, Ward Bond	War drama	20th Century Fox
They Got Me Covered	David Butler	Bob Hope, Dorothy Lamour	Comedy	RKO
This Is the Army	Michael Curtiz	George Murphy, Ronald Reagan, Joan Leslie, Kate Smith	Musical	Warner Bros.; music by Irving Berlin
This Land Is Mine	Jean Renoir	Charles Laughton, Maureen O'Hara	Drama	RKO
Thousands Cheer	George Sidney	Kathryn Grayson, Gene Kelly	Musical	MGM
Three Hearts for Julia	Richard Thorpe	Ann Sothern, Melvyn Douglas	Comedy	MGM
Three Russian Girls	Fedor Ozep	Anna Sten, Kent Smith	War comedy	United Artists
Thumbs Up	Joseph Santley	Brenda Joyce, Richard Fraser	Musical	Republic
Thundering Trails	John English	Bob Steele, Tom Tyler, Nell O'Day	Western	Republic
Tiger Fangs	Sam Newfield	Frank Buck, June Duprez	Adventure	PRC
Tonight We Raid Calais	John Brahm	Anabella, John Sutton, Blanche Yurka, Lee J. Cobb	War	20th Century Fox
Top Man	Charles Lamont	Donald O'Connor, Susanna Foster, Lillian Gish	Musical	Universal
Tornado	William A. Berke	Chester Morris, Nancy Kelly	Drama	Paramount
Trail of Terror	Oliver Drake	Dave O'Brien, Guy Wilkerson	Western	PRC
Truck Busters	B. Reeves Eason	Richard Travis, Ruth Ford	Drama	Warner Bros.
True to Life	George Marshall	Mary Martin, Dick Powell	Drama	Paramount
Two Fisted Justice	Robert Emmett Tansey	David Sharpe, Max Terhune	Western	Monogram
Two Senoritas from Chicago	Frank Woodruff	Joan Davis, Jinx Falkenburg, Ann Savage	Musical comedy	Columbia
Two Tickets to London	Edwin L. Marin	Michèle Morgan, Barry Fitzgerald	Drama	Universal
Two Weeks to Live	Malcolm St. Clair	Franklin Pangborn, Kay Linaker	Comedy	RKO; Lum and Abner

== U–Z ==
Title	Director	Cast	Genre	Notes
The Underdog	William Nigh	Barton MacLane, Jan Wiley	Drama	PRC
The Unknown Guest	Kurt Neumann	Victor Jory, Pamela Blake, Veda Ann Borg	Mystery	Monogram
The Vigilantes Ride	William Berke	Russell Hayden, Dub Taylor	Western	Columbia
Wagon Tracks West	Howard Bretherton	Wild Bill Elliott, Anne Jeffreys	Western	Republic
Watch on the Rhine	Herman Shumlin	Bette Davis, Paul Lukas, Geraldine Fitzgerald	Drama	Warner Bros.; script by Dashiell Hammett
West of Texas	Oliver Drake	Dave O'Brien, Guy Wilkerson	Western	PRC
The West Side Kid	George Sherman	Don "Red" Barry, Dale Evans	Crime	Republic
Western Cyclone	Sam Newfield	Buster Crabbe, Al St. John	Western	PRC
We've Never Been Licked	John Rawlins	Richard Quine, Anne Gwynne	War	Universal
What a Woman!	Irving Cummings	Rosalind Russell, Brian Aherne	Comedy	Columbia
What's Buzzin', Cousin?	Charles Barton	Ann Miller, Eddie "Rochester" Anderson	Musical	Columbia
Where Are Your Children?	William Nigh	Jackie Cooper, Gale Storm, Patricia Morison	Crime	Monogram
Whispering Footsteps	Howard Bretherton	John Hubbard, Rita Quigley	Film noir	Republic
Whistling in Brooklyn	S. Sylvan Simon	Red Skelton, Ann Rutherford, Jean Rogers	Comedy	MGM
White Savage	Arthur Lubin	Maria Montez, Jon Hall	Adventure	Universal
Wild Horse Rustlers	Sam Newfield	Robert Livingston, Al St. John	Western	PRC
Wild Horse Stampede	Alan James	Ken Maynard, Hoot Gibson, Betty Miles	Western	Monogram
Wings Over the Pacific	Phil Rosen	Edward Norris, Inez Cooper, Montagu Love	War	Monogram
Wintertime	John Brahm	Sonja Henie, Cesar Romero	Musical	20th Century Fox
Wolves of the Range	Sam Newfield	Robert Livingston, Al St. John	Western	PRC
The Woman of the Town	George Archainbaud	Claire Trevor, Albert Dekker	Western	United Artists
Women in Bondage	Steve Sekely	Gail Patrick, Nancy Kelly	Drama	Monogram
Yanks Ahoy	Kurt Neumann	William Tracy, Joe Sawyer	Comedy	United Artists
You Can't Beat the Law	Phil Rosen	Edward Norris, Joan Woodbury	Drama	Monogram
Young and Willing	Edward H. Griffith	William Holden, Susan Hayward	Comedy	Paramount
Young Ideas	Jules Dassin	Susan Peters, Mary Astor	Drama	MGM
The Youngest Profession	Edward Buzzell	Virginia Weidler, Edward Arnold, Agnes Moorehead	Comedy	MGM
You're a Lucky Fellow, Mr. Smith	Felix E. Feist	Allan Jones, Billie Burke	Musical comedy	Universal

== Documentaries ==
Title	Director	Cast	Genre	Notes
Autobiography of a 'Jeep'			Propaganda	
The Battle of Britain	Frank Capra	Narrated by Walter Huston	Documentary	
The Battle of Russia	Frank Capra		Documentary	

== Serials ==
Title	Director	Cast	Genre	Notes
The Adventures of Smilin' Jack	Lewis D. Collins, Ray Taylor	Tom Brown, Rose Hobart, Marjorie Lord, Keye Luke, Sidney Toler	Serial	Universal
Adventures of the Flying Cadets	Lewis D. Collins, Ray Taylor	Johnny Downs, Eduardo Ciannelli	Serial	Universal
Batman	Lambert Hillyer	Lewis Wilson, Douglas Croft, J. Carrol Naish, Shirley Patterson	Action	Columbia
Daredevils of the West	John English	Allan Lane, Kay Aldridge	Serial	Republic
Don Winslow of the Coast Guard	Lewis D. Collins	Don Terry, June Duprez	Serial	Universal
G-Men vs. the Black Dragon	William Witney	Constance Worth, Rod Cameron	Serial	Republic
The Masked Marvel	Spencer Bennet	William Forrest, Louise Currie	Serial	Republic
The Phantom		Tom Tyler, Jeanne Bates	Serial	
Secret Service in Darkest Africa		Rod Cameron, Joan Marsh	Serial	Republic

== Shorts ==
Title	Director	Cast	Genre	Notes
An Itch in Time	Bob Clampett	Elmer Fudd	Animated	Merrie Melodies
Baby Puss	Hanna-Barbera		Animated Short	MGM
Back from the Front	Jules White	The Three Stooges	Comedy Short	Columbia
Black Marketing	William Castle		Propaganda	
Brazil at War	William Castle		Propaganda	
A Challenge to Democracy			Propaganda	
Combat America		Clark Gable	Propaganda	
Daffy – The Commando	Friz Freleng	Daffy Duck	Animated Short	
December 7th	John Ford		Propaganda	
Dizzy Detectives	Jules White	The Three Stooges	Comedy Short	Columbia
Dizzy Pilots	Jules White	The Three Stooges	Comedy Short	Columbia
Education for Death	Clyde Geronimi		Animated short	
Falling Hare	Robert Clampett	Bugs Bunny	Animated	Merrie Melodies
Family Troubles		Our Gang	Short	
Der Fuehrer's Face	Jack Kinney		Animation	Disney
Food for Fighters			Propaganda	On military nutrition
A Gem of a Jam	Del Lord	The Three Stooges	Comedy Short	Columbia
Higher Than a Kite	Del Lord	The Three Stooges	Comedy Short	Columbia
I Can Hardly Wait	Jules White	The Three Stooges	Comedy Short	Columbia
The Lonesome Mouse	Hanna-Barbera	Tom and Jerry	Animated Short	
Meshes of the Afternoon	Maya Deren, Alexander Hammid		Short	Experimental film
Mission Accomplished			Propaganda	Film on B-17 Flying Fortress
Negro Colleges in War Time			Propaganda Short	
The New Spirit			Propaganda	Animated short
Our Enemy- The Japanese			Propaganda	
Phony Express	Del Lord	The Three Stooges	Comedy Short	Columbia
Pigs in a Polka	Friz Freleng		Animated Short	
Porky Pig's Feat	Frank Tashlin		Animated Short	
Prelude to War	Frank Capra		Propaganda	first in Capra's Why We Fight series
Red Hot Riding Hood	Tex Avery		Animated	
Report from the Aleutians	John Huston		Propaganda	
Scrap Happy Daffy	Frank Tashlin	Daffy Duck	Animated Short	
Show Business at War			Propaganda Short	
Spook Louder	Del Lord	The Three Stooges	Comedy Short	Columbia
Sufferin' Cats!		Tom and Jerry	Animated Short	
Suggestion Box			Propaganda Short	
Super-Rabbit		Bugs Bunny	Animated Short	
They Stooge to Conga	Del Lord	The Three Stooges	Comedy Short	Columbia
Three Little Twirps	Harry Edwards	The Three Stooges	Comedy Short	Columbia
To the People of the United States	Arthur Lubin		Propaganda Short	
Troop Train			Propaganda Short	
Victory Through Air Power			Animated	
Wackiki Wabbit	Chuck Jones	Bugs Bunny	Animated Short	
Wartime Nutrition			Propaganda Short	
Who Killed Who?	Tex Avery		Animated Short	
Willoughby's Magic Hat	Bob Wickersham		Animated Short	
Yankee Doodle Daffy	Friz Freleng	Daffy Duck, Porky Pig	Animated Short	
The Yankee Doodle Mouse	Hanna-Barbera	Tom and Jerry	Animated Short	
You, John Jones!	Mervyn LeRoy	James Cagney, Ann Sothern	Short	MGM

== See also ==
- 1943 in the United States
