= Glen Glenn Sound =

Defunct American audio post production company

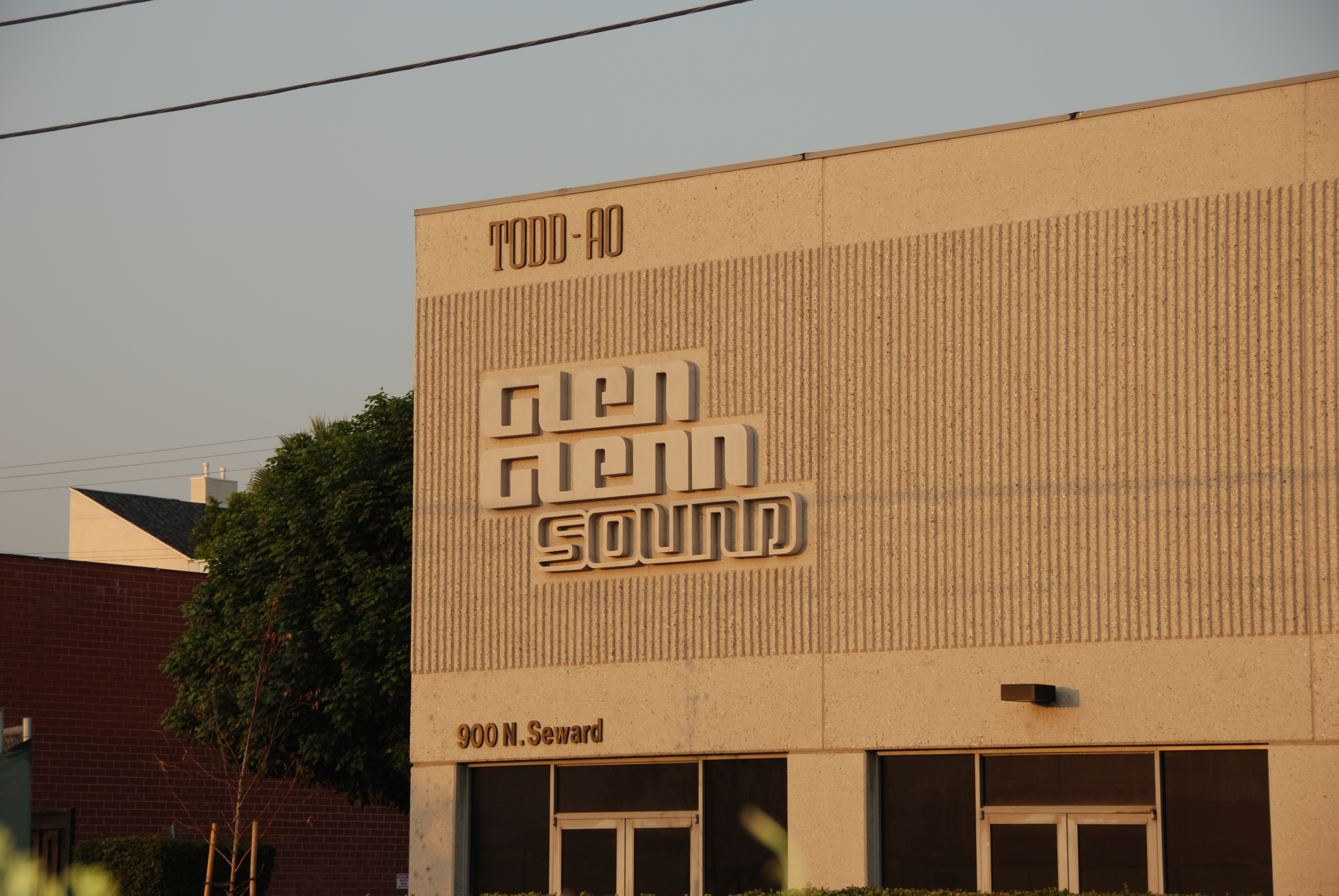
Todd-AO Hollywood (former Glen Glenn headquarters) in Hollywood. Note the "Todd-AO" logo above now reads 'Deluxe'.

Glen Glenn Sound was an audio post production company formerly located in Hollywood, Los Angeles, California.

The company was co-founded by Glen R. Glenn and Harry Eckles (sound recordist) in 1937. It provided creative audio services to the television and film industry for five decades. Tom Kobayashi served as VP, President, and Chief Operating Officer from 1965 to 1985. The company was acquired by audio post production company Todd-AO in 1986.

In 2015, the facility was purchased by Deluxe Entertainment Services Group and the main theater became "Stage One," the largest digital intermediate color theater in North America. It is located at 900 N Seward St, Hollywood, CA 90038.

== Audio post productions ==
The Glen Glenn Sound company services have since been used on over 20,000 movies and television series episodes.

It was occasionally billed (credited) as Glen Glen, rather than as Glen Glenn, most particularly in Popkin productions.

Glen Glenn Sound
- Industry: Audio post production
- Founded: 1937; 89 years ago
- Headquarters: 900 North Seward Street, Hollywood, Los Angeles, California
- Key people: Glen R. Glenn; Harry Eckles

=== Movies and TV shows ===
Movies and TV shows with sound recording and/or audio post production services done at Glen Glenn Sound include:

- The Legion of Missing Men (1937)
- Unashamed: A Romance (1938)
- The Ape Man (1943)
- Wild West (1946)
- Black Hills (1947)
- Border Feud (1947)
- Pioneer Justice (1947)
- Stage to Mesa City (1947)
- West to Glory (1947)
- Hands of a Stranger (1962)
- Manos: The Hands of Fate (1966)
- Check Your Guns (1948)
- The Hawk of Powder River (1948)
- Tornado Range (1948)
- Dalton Gang (1949)
- Prehistoric Women (1950)
- The Jack Benny Show (1950-1965)
- I Love Lucy (1951-1957)
- The Range Rider (1951-1953)
- The Adventures of Ozzie & Harriet (1952-1964)
- Make Room for Daddy (1953-1965)
- The Loretta Young Show (1953-1961)
- Annie Oakley (1954-1957)
- Sergeant Preston of the Yukon (1955-1958)
- The Adventures of Jim Bowie (1956-1958)
- Perry Mason (1957-1966)
- The Californians (1957-1959)
- The Lucy-Desi Comedy Hour (1957-1960)
- The Real McCoys (1957-1963)
- Whirlybirds (1957-1960)
- Rescue 8 (1958-1960)
- Sheriff of Cochise (1958-1960)
- The Untouchables (1959-1963)
- The Andy Griffith Show (1960-1968)
- The Dick Van Dyke Show (1961–1966, CBS)
- The Joey Bishop Show (1961-1965)
- The Lucy Show (1962–1968)
- My Favorite Martian (1963-1966)
- Gomer Pyle, U.S.M.C. (1964-1969)
- Get Smart (1965-1970, CBS)
- That Girl (1966-1971)
- Mission Impossible (1966-1973, CBS)
- Star Trek (1966–1969, NBC)
- Mannix (1967-1975)
- Here's Lucy (1968–1974, CBS)
- Badlands (1973)
- The Brady Bunch (1969–1974, ABC)
- Le Mans (film) (1971)
- The New Perry Mason (1973-1974)
- Barney Miller (1974-1982)
- Happy Days (1974-1984)
- Little House on the Prairie (1974-1983)
- The Legend of Lizzie Borden (1975, ABC)
- Laverne & Shirley (1976-1983)
- Mork & Mindy (1978-1982)
- Taxi (1978-1983)
- Days of Heaven (1978)
- Heaven Can Wait (1978)
- Raise the Titanic (1980)
- Tom and Jerry Comedy Show (1980-1982)
- Cagney & Lacey (1981-1986)
- Greatest American Hero (1981-1986)
- Star Trek II: The Wrath of Khan (1982)
- Cheers (1982–1986, NBC)
- The A-Team (1983-1986)
- Hardcastle and McCormick (1983-1986)
- Stop Making Sense (1984)
- Star Trek III: The Search for Spock (1984)
- Muppet Babies (1984-1986, CBS)
- Riptide (1984-1986)
- Perry Mason Returns (1985, NBC)
- Re-Animator (1985)
- Happy New Year, Charlie Brown! (1986)
- Jocks (1986)
- You're a Good Man, Charlie Brown (1986)
- Star Trek IV: The Voyage Home (1986)
- Star Trek V: The Final Frontier (1989)
- We're Back! A Dinosaur's Story (1993)

== See also ==
- Cinema of Southern California
- Entertainment companies based in California
