= Glen Glenn =

Glen Glenn may refer to:

- Glen Glenn (sound engineer) (1907–1960), American sound recorder and co-founder of the Glen Glenn Sound Company
  - Glen Glenn Sound, sound studio
- Glen Glenn (singer) (1934–2022), American rockabilly singer
