= The Westward Trail =

1948 film

- Theatrical release poster
- Directed by: Ray Taylor
- Screenplay by: Robert Alan Miller
- Produced by: Jerry Thomas
- Starring: Eddie Dean; Roscoe Ates; Phyllis Planchard; Eileene Hardin; Steve Drake; Bob Duncan
- Cinematography: Ernest Miller
- Edited by: Hugh Winn
- Production company: Producers Releasing Corporation
- Distributed by: Producers Releasing Corporation
- Release date: March 13, 1948
- Running time: 56 minutes
- Country: United States
- Language: English

The Westward Trail is a 1948 American Western film directed by Ray Taylor and written by Robert Alan Miller. The film stars Eddie Dean, Roscoe Ates, Phyllis Planchard, Eileene Hardin, Steve Drake and Bob Duncan. The film was released on March 13, 1948, by Producers Releasing Corporation.

== Cast ==
- Eddie Dean as Eddie Dean
- Roscoe Ates as Soapy Jones
- Phyllis Planchard as Ann Howard
- Eileene Hardin as Mrs. Benson
- Steve Drake as Tom Howard
- Bob Duncan as Chuck Larson
- Carl Mathews as Art Hardin
- Lee Morgan as Sheriff Buck McNeal
- Bob Woodward as Stage Driver
- Budd Buster as Benson
- Slim Whitaker as Bartender
- Frank Ellis as Taggart
- Andy Parker as Andy Parker
- Copper the Horse as Eddie's Horse
