= The Silver Bullet (1942 film) =

1942 film by Joseph H. Lewis

- Theatrical release poster
- Directed by: Joseph H. Lewis
- Screenplay by: Elizabeth Beecher
- Story by: Oliver Drake
- Produced by: Oliver Drake
- Starring: Johnny Mack Brown; Fuzzy Knight; William Farnum; Jennifer Holt; LeRoy Mason; Rex Lease
- Cinematography: Charles Van Enger
- Edited by: Maurice Wright
- Production company: Universal Pictures
- Distributed by: Universal Pictures
- Release date: August 5, 1942
- Running time: 56 minutes
- Country: United States
- Language: English

The Silver Bullet is a 1942 American Western film directed by Joseph H. Lewis and written by Elizabeth Beecher. The film stars Johnny Mack Brown, Fuzzy Knight, William Farnum, Jennifer Holt, LeRoy Mason and Rex Lease. The film was released on August 5, 1942, by Universal Pictures.

== Cast ==
- Johnny Mack Brown as 'Silver Jim' Donovan
- Fuzzy Knight as Wild Bill Jones
- William Farnum as Dr. Thad Morgan
- Jennifer Holt as Nancy Lee
- LeRoy Mason as Walter Kincaid
- Rex Lease as Rance Harris
- Grace Lenard as Queenie Canfield
- Claire Whitney as Emily Morgan
- Slim Whitaker as Buck Dawson
- Michael Vallon as Nevada Norton
- Merrill McCormick as Pete Sleen
- Nora Lou Martin as Nora
