= Wild Country (1947 film) =

1947 film by Ray Taylor

- Directed by: Ray Taylor
- Written by: Arthur E. Orloff (original screenplay)
- Produced by: Jerry Thomas (producer)
- Starring: See below
- Cinematography: Robert E. Cline
- Edited by: Hugh Winn
- Music by: Karl Hajos
- Release date: 1947
- Running time: 55 minutes
- Country: United States
- Language: English

Wild Country is a 1947 American Western film directed by Ray Taylor.

== Cast ==
- Eddie Dean as Marshal Eddie Dean
- Flash as Flash
- Roscoe Ates as Soapy Jones
- Peggy Wynne as Martha Devery
- Douglas Fowley as Clark Varney
- I. Stanford Jolley as Rip Caxton
- Lee Roberts as Sheriff Josh Huckings
- Forrest Matthews as Henchman Sam
- William Fawcett as Lawyer Joe Spindle
- Henry Hall as Marshal Harlan G. Thayer
- Charles Jordan as Convict Brown
- Richard Cramer as Guard #1
- Gus Taute as Dilling
- The Sunshine Boys as Singing Cowhands

== Soundtrack ==
- Eddie Dean with The Sunshine Boys - "Wild Country" (Written by Eddie Dean and Hal Blair)
- Eddie Dean with The Sunshine Boys - "Saddle With a Golden Horn" (Written by Pete Gates)
- Eddie Dean with The Sunshine Boys - "Ain't No Gal Got a Brand On Me" (Written by Pete Gates)
