= Over the Santa Fe Trail =

1947 film by Ray Nazarro

- Theatrical release poster
- Directed by: Ray Nazarro
- Screenplay by: Louise Rousseau
- Story by: Eileen Gary
- Produced by: Colbert Clark
- Starring: Ken Curtis; Jennifer Holt; Guy Kibbee; Guinn "Big Boy" Williams; Noel Neill; Holmes Herbert
- Cinematography: George F. Kelley
- Edited by: Robert Hoover
- Production company: Columbia Pictures
- Distributed by: Columbia Pictures
- Release date: February 13, 1947
- Running time: 63 minutes
- Country: United States
- Language: English

Over the Santa Fe Trail is a 1947 American Western film directed by Ray Nazarro and written by Louise Rousseau. The film stars Ken Curtis, Jennifer Holt, Guy Kibbee, Guinn "Big Boy" Williams, Noel Neill and Holmes Herbert. The film was released on February 13, 1947, by Columbia Pictures.

== Cast ==
- Ken Curtis as Curt Mason
- Jennifer Holt as Carolyn
- Guy Kibbee as Biscuits
- Guinn "Big Boy" Williams as Big Boy Jackson
- Noel Neill as Taffy Neill
- Holmes Herbert as Doc Henderson
- Babette De Castro as Singer
- Cherie De Castro as Singer
- Peggy De Castro as Singer
- Art West as Art West
- Paul Trietsch as Hot Shot Hezzie
- Ken Trietsch as Hot Shot Ken
- Gil Taylor as Hot Shot Bass Player
- Charles Ward as Hot Shot Gabe
