= The Fighting Vigilantes =

1947 film directed by Ray Taylor

- Theatrical release poster
- Directed by: Ray Taylor
- Screenplay by: Robert B. Churchill
- Produced by: Jerry Thomas
- Starring: Lash LaRue; Al St. John; Jennifer Holt; George Chesebro; Lee Morgan; Marshall Reed; Carl Mathews; Russell Arms
- Cinematography: Ernest Miller
- Edited by: Hugh Winn
- Music by: Walter Greene
- Production company: Producers Releasing Corporation
- Distributed by: Producers Releasing Corporation
- Release date: November 15, 1947
- Running time: 61 minutes
- Country: United States
- Language: English

The Fighting Vigilantes is a 1947 American Western film directed by Ray Taylor and written by Robert B. Churchill. The film stars Lash LaRue, Al St. John, Jennifer Holt, George Chesebro, Lee Morgan, Marshall Reed, Carl Mathews and Russell Arms. The film was released on November 15, 1947, by Producers Releasing Corporation.

== Cast ==
- Lash LaRue as Marshal Cheyenne Davis
- Al St. John as Fuzzy Q. Jones
- Jennifer Holt as Abby Jackson
- George Chesebro as Price Taylor
- Lee Morgan as Sheriff
- Marshall Reed as Chick
- Carl Mathews as Shanks
- Russell Arms as Trippler
- Steve Clark as Frank Jackson
- John Elliott as Bert
- Felice Richmond as Ellie
