= Trail of the Mounties =

1947 film by Howard Bretherton

- Directed by: Howard Bretherton
- Screenplay by: Betty Burbridge
- Story by: Carl K. Hittleman; Harold Kline
- Produced by: Carl K. Hittleman; Maury Nunes
- Starring: Russell Hayden; Jennifer Holt; Emmett Lynn
- Cinematography: Benjamin H. Kline
- Edited by: Paul Landres
- Music by: Albert Glasser
- Production company: Bali Pictures Inc.
- Distributed by: Screen Guild Productions (US); Exclusive Films (UK)
- Release dates: December 20, 1947 (US); (US); 1952 (UK)
- Running time: 45 minutes
- Country: United States
- Language: English

Trail of the Mounties, also known as Law of the Mounties, is a 1947 American Western film directed by Howard Bretherton and starring Russell Hayden, Jennifer Holt, and Emmett Lynn.

== Plot ==
A Royal Canadian Mounted Policeman is seeking to thwart a gang of fur thieves led by his twin brother Johnny.

== Cast ==
- Russell Hayden as Sandy/ Johnny Sanderson
- Jennifer Holt as Kathie McBain
- Emmett Lynn as Gumdrop
- Terry Frost as Nick
- Harry Cording as Hawkins
- Charles Bedell as Maurice
- Zon Murray as Jacques
