= Check Your Guns =

1948 film

- Film poster
- Directed by: Ray Taylor
- Written by: Joseph O'Donnell (original screenplay)
- Produced by: Jerry Thomas
- Starring: Eddie Dean; Nancy Gates
- Cinematography: Ernest Miller
- Edited by: Joseph Gluck
- Music by: Walter Greene
- Production company: Producers Releasing Corporation
- Distributed by: Eagle-Lion Films
- Release date: 1948
- Running time: 53 minutes
- Country: United States
- Language: English

Check Your Guns is a 1948 American Western film directed by Ray Taylor. It stars Eddie Dean and Nancy Gates.

== Cast ==
- Eddie Dean as Eddie Dean
- Nancy Gates as Cathy Jordan
- Roscoe Ates as Soapy Jones
- George Chesebro as Banker Farrell
- I. Stanford Jolley as Brad Taggert
- Mikel Conrad as Ace Banyon
- Lane Bradford as Slim Grogan
- Terry Frost as Sloane
- Wally West as henchman
- Dee Cooper as henchman
- William Fawcett as Judge Hammond
- Andy Parker as Jeff
