= The Hawk of Powder River =

1948 film by Ray Taylor

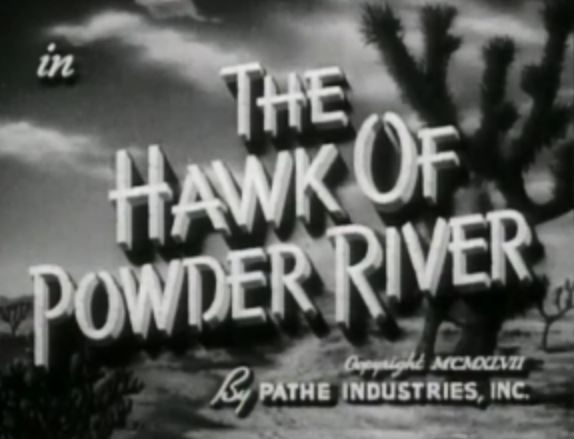
- title card for film
- Directed by: Ray Taylor
- Written by: George Smith (original screenplay)
- Produced by: Jerry Thomas
- Starring: See below
- Cinematography: Ernest Miller
- Edited by: Joseph Gluck
- Production company: Producers Releasing Corporation
- Distributed by: Eagle-Lion Films
- Release date: 10 April 1948
- Running time: 54 minutes
- Country: United States
- Language: English

The Hawk of Powder River is a 1948 American Western film directed by Ray Taylor.

== Cast ==
- Eddie Dean as Deputy Marshal Eddie Dean
- White Cloud as Eddie's Horse
- Roscoe Ates as Soapy Jones
- Jennifer Holt as Vivian Chambers aka The Hawk
- June Carlson as Carole Chambers
- Eddie Parker as Mike Cochrane, the lawyer
- Terry Frost as Henchman Mitchell
- Lane Bradford as Henchman Cooper
- Carl Mathews as Henchman
- Ted French as Henchman Carson
- Steve Clark as Bill Chambers
- Tex Palmer as Stage driver Charlie
- Andy Parker as Cowhand / Musician
- The Plainsmen as Cowhands / Musicians

== Soundtrack ==
- "Black Hills" (by Eddie Dean and Hal Blair)
- "Wild Country" (by Eddie Dean and Hal Blair)
- "Punchinello" (by Pete Gates)
- "Rose Anne of San Jose" (by Pete Gates)
