= Cheyenne Roundup =

1943 film by Ray Taylor

- Theatrical release poster
- Directed by: Ray Taylor
- Screenplay by: Elmer Clifton; Bernard McConville
- Story by: Elmer Clifton
- Produced by: Oliver Drake
- Starring: Johnny Mack Brown; Tex Ritter; Fuzzy Knight; Jennifer Holt; Harry Woods; Roy Barcroft
- Cinematography: William A. Sickner
- Edited by: Otto Ludwig
- Production company: Universal Pictures
- Distributed by: Universal Pictures
- Release date: April 12, 1943
- Running time: 59 minutes
- Country: United States
- Language: English

Cheyenne Roundup is a 1943 American Western film directed by Ray Taylor and written by Elmer Clifton and Bernard McConville. The film stars Johnny Mack Brown, Tex Ritter, Fuzzy Knight, Jennifer Holt, Harry Woods and Roy Barcroft. The film was released on April 12, 1943, by Universal Pictures.

== Cast ==
- Johnny Mack Brown as Gils Brandon / Buck Brandon
- Tex Ritter as Steve Rawlins
- Fuzzy Knight as Cal Calkins
- Jennifer Holt as Ellen Randall
- Harry Woods as Blackie Dawson
- Roy Barcroft as Slim Layton
- Robert Barron as Judge Hickenbottom
- Budd Buster as Bonanza Smith
- Gil Patric as Perkins
- Jimmy Wakely as Guitar Player
- Johnny Bond as Concertina Player
- Scotty Harrel as Singer
