= Frontier Law =

1943 film by Elmer Clifton

- Theatrical release poster
- Directed by: Elmer Clifton
- Screenplay by: Elmer Clifton
- Produced by: Oliver Drake
- Starring: Russell Hayden; Fuzzy Knight; Dennis Moore; Jennifer Holt; Jack Ingram; Wally Wales; George Eldredge; I. Stanford Jolley; Frank LaRue
- Cinematography: William A. Sickner
- Edited by: Edgar Zane
- Production company: Universal Pictures
- Distributed by: Universal Pictures
- Release date: November 5, 1943
- Running time: 55 minutes
- Country: United States
- Language: English

Frontier Law is a 1943 American Western film written and directed by Elmer Clifton. The film stars Russell Hayden, Fuzzy Knight, Dennis Moore, Jennifer Holt, Jack Ingram, Wally Wales, George Eldredge, I. Stanford Jolley and Frank LaRue. The film was released on November 5, 1943, by Universal Pictures.

== Cast ==
- Russell Hayden as Jim Warren
- Fuzzy Knight as Ramblin' Rufe Randel
- Dennis Moore as Dusty Norton
- Jennifer Holt as Lois Rodgers
- Jack Ingram as Joe Hawkins
- Wally Wales as Frank Rodgers
- George Eldredge as Slinger Jones
- I. Stanford Jolley as Weasel
- Frank LaRue as Sam Vernon
- James Farley as Jed Bates
- Johnny Bond as Jack
