= Tenting Tonight on the Old Camp Ground =

1943 film directed by Lewis D. Collins

- Theatrical release poster
- Directed by: Lewis D. Collins
- Screenplay by: Elizabeth Beecher
- Story by: Harry L. Fraser
- Produced by: Oliver Drake
- Starring: Johnny Mack Brown; Tex Ritter; Fuzzy Knight; Jennifer Holt; John Elliott; Earle Hodgins
- Cinematography: William A. Sickner
- Edited by: Charles Maynard
- Production company: Universal Pictures
- Distributed by: Universal Pictures
- Release date: February 5, 1943
- Running time: 62 minutes
- Country: United States
- Language: English

Tenting Tonight on the Old Camp Ground is a 1943 American Western film directed by Lewis D. Collins and written by Elizabeth Beecher. The film stars Johnny Mack Brown, Tex Ritter, Fuzzy Knight, Jennifer Holt, John Elliott and Earle Hodgins. The film was released on February 5, 1943, by Universal Pictures.

== Cast ==
- Johnny Mack Brown as Wade Benson
- Tex Ritter as Bob Courtney
- Fuzzy Knight as Si Dugan
- Jennifer Holt as Kay Randolph
- John Elliott as Inspector Talbot
- Earle Hodgins as Judge Higgins
- Rex Lease as Zeke Larkin
- Lane Chandler as Duke Merrick
- Alan Bridge as Matt Warner
- Dennis Moore as Ed Randolph
- Tom London as Henchman Pete
- Bud Osborne as Deputy Snell
- Lynton Brent as Sheriff
- Reed Howes as Smoke Dawson
- George Plues as Stage Driver
- Hank Worden as Sleepy Martin
- Jimmy Wakely as Jimmy
- Johnny Bond as Singer
- Scotty Harrel as Singer
