= Silver City Raiders =

1943 film by William Berke

- Theatrical release poster
- Directed by: William Berke
- Screenplay by: Ed Earl Repp
- Produced by: Leon Barsha
- Starring: Russell Hayden; Dub Taylor; Bob Wills; Alma Carroll; Paul Sutton; Jack Ingram
- Cinematography: Benjamin H. Kline
- Edited by: Jerome Thoms
- Production company: Columbia Pictures
- Distributed by: Columbia Pictures
- Release date: November 4, 1943
- Running time: 55 minutes
- Country: United States
- Language: English

Silver City Raiders is a 1943 American Western film directed by William Berke and written by Ed Earl Repp. The film stars Russell Hayden, Dub Taylor, Bob Wills, Alma Carroll, Paul Sutton and Jack Ingram. The film was released on November 4, 1943, by Columbia Pictures.

== Cast ==
- Russell Hayden as Lucky Harlan
- Dub Taylor as Cannonball
- Bob Wills as Bob Halliday
- Alma Carroll as Dolores Alvarez
- Paul Sutton as Bart Dawson
- Jack Ingram as Dirk
- Edmund Cobb as Ringo
- Art Mix as Slim
