= Tornado Range =

1948 film directed by Ray Taylor

- Theatrical release poster
- Directed by: Ray Taylor
- Screenplay by: William Lively
- Produced by: Jerry Thomas
- Starring: Eddie Dean; Roscoe Ates; Jennifer Holt; George Chesebro; Buster Slaven; Marshall Reed
- Cinematography: James S. Brown Jr.
- Edited by: Joseph Gluck
- Production company: Producers Releasing Corporation
- Distributed by: Eagle-Lion Films
- Release date: February 21, 1948
- Running time: 56 minutes
- Country: United States
- Language: English

Tornado Range is a 1948 American Western film directed by Ray Taylor and written by William Lively. The film stars Eddie Dean, Roscoe Ates, Jennifer Holt, George Chesebro, Buster Slaven and Marshall Reed. The film was released on February 21, 1948, by Eagle-Lion Films.

== Cast ==
- Eddie Dean as Eddie Dean
- Roscoe Ates as Soapy Jones
- Jennifer Holt as Mary King
- George Chesebro as Lance King
- Buster Slaven as Jebby Sawyer
- Marshall Reed as Sam Wilson
- Terry Frost as Thayer
- Lane Bradford as Thorne
- Russell Arms as Killer Dorgan aka Ben Colton
- Steve Clark as Pop Sawyer
- Andy Parker as Musician
- Copper the Horse as Eddie's Horse
