= Shadow Valley (1947 film) =

1947 film

- Directed by: Ray Taylor
- Written by: Arthur Sherman
- Produced by: Jerry Thomas
- Starring: Eddie Dean; Roscoe Ates; Jennifer Holt
- Cinematography: Ernest Miller
- Edited by: Joseph Gluck
- Music by: Walter Greene
- Production company: Producers Releasing Corporation
- Distributed by: Producers Releasing Corporation
- Release date: November 29, 1947
- Running time: 59 minutes
- Country: United States
- Language: English

Shadow Valley is a 1947 American Western film directed by Ray Taylor and starring Eddie Dean, Roscoe Ates and Jennifer Holt. It was made as a second feature by the independent Producers Releasing Corporation. It was shot at the Iverson Ranch in California.

== Cast ==
- Eddie Dean as Eddie Dean
- Roscoe Ates as Soapy Jones
- Jennifer Holt as Mary Ann Jarvis
- George Chesebro as Ben Gunnison
- Eddie Parker as Barney Foster
- Lee Morgan as Sheriff
- Lane Bradford as Cowhand Bob
- Carl Mathews as Henchman
- Budd Buster as Judd Grimes
- Forrest Taylor as Dad Jarvis
- White Cloud as White Cloud

== Bibliography ==
- Pitts, Michael R. Western Movies: A Guide to 5,105 Feature Films. McFarland, 2012.
