= Bob Woodward (actor) =

Actor (1909–1972)

- Born: March 5, 1909; Oklahoma, US
- Died: February 7, 1972 (aged 62); Granada Hills, California
- Occupations: Actor; Stuntman
- Years active: 1931–1963

Bob Woodward (March 5, 1909 – February 7, 1972) was an American actor of film and television, best known for his role in The Range Rider (1951–1953).

== Career ==
In his earlier roles, Woodward co-starred in the western films California Mail (1936), Pioneer Justice (1947), Range Renegades (1948), and Junction City (1952). Woodward played the role of a stagecoach driver in two television series, The Gene Autry Show (1950–55) in 43 episodes, and Buffalo Bill, Jr. (1955–1956) in 20 episodes. He was cast as a henchman on the series The Range Rider (1951–53) in 24 episodes. He also appeared in the syndicated series Annie Oakley. In the 1950s and 1960s, he guest-starred in nine episodes of The Lone Ranger, seven episodes of Tales of Wells Fargo, five episodes of Have Gun - Will Travel, and in three episodes of The Life and Legend of Wyatt Earp. He worked as a stuntman in a film and television, and appeared as a stunt double for Gene Autry. He is a member of the Hollywood Stuntmen's Hall of Fame.

== Films ==
91 Titles in Filmography, as listed in the AFI Catalog:

- 1931 – Rider of the Plains
- 1936 – California Mail
- 1937 – The Fighting Texan
- 1938 – The Frontiersmen
- 1939 – The Taming of the West
- 1940 – The Dark Command
- 1941 – Sheriff of Tombstone
- 1946 – Swing, Cowboy, Swing
- 1947 – Pioneer Justice
- 1949 – Gun Law Justice
- 1948 – Range Renegades
- 1948 – Courtin' Trouble
- 1948 – Back Trail
- 1948 – Partners of the Sunset
- 1948 – The Sheriff of Medicine Bow
- 1948 – The Tioga Kid
- 1948 - Hidden Danger
- 1948 – Triggerman
- 1949 – Law of the West
- 1950 – Vigilante Hideout
- 1952 – Junction City
- 1953 – Jack Slade
- 1958 – The Lone Ranger and the Lost City of Gold
- 1963 – Red Runs the River

=== Stunts ===
- 1939 – Melody Ranch
- 1949 – Stampede
- 1950 – Stage to Tucson
- 1951 – Texans Never Cry
- 1953 – The Stranger Wore a Gun
- 1956 – Westward Ho the Wagons!
- 1956 – 7th Cavalry
- 1958 – Apache Territory

== TV series ==
- 1950 – The Gene Autry Show
- 1951 – The Range Rider
- 1954 – Annie Oakley
- 1955 – Buffalo Bill, Jr.
