= Hidden Danger (film) =

1948 film

- Directed by: Ray Taylor
- Written by: J. Benton Cheney; Eliot Gibbons
- Produced by: Barney A. Sarecky
- Starring: Johnny Mack Brown; Raymond Hatton; Max Terhune
- Cinematography: Harry Neumann
- Edited by: John C. Fuller
- Music by: Edward J. Kay
- Production company: Monogram Pictures
- Distributed by: Monogram Pictures
- Release date: December 12, 1948
- Running time: 55 minutes
- Country: United States
- Language: English

Hidden Danger is a 1948 American western film directed by Ray Taylor and starring Johnny Mack Brown, Raymond Hatton and Max Terhune. It was a second feature, distributed by Monogram Pictures which specialized in low-budget westerns and crime films. It was partly shot on location in Santa Clarita, California. The film's sets were designed by the art director Vin Taylor.

== Cast ==
- Johnny Mack Brown as Johnny Mack
- Raymond Hatton as Juniper
- Max Terhune as Alibi
- Christine Larson as Valarie Carson
- Myron Healey as James Carson
- Marshall Reed as Terry Mason
- Kenne Duncan as Henchman Bender
- Edmund Cobb as Sheriff
- Steve Clark as Russell - Packing Company Owner
- Milburn Morante as Potts
- Carol Henry as Hired-Gunman Trigger
- Bill Hale as Rancher Sanderson
- Bob Woodward as Henchman Joe
- Boyd Stockman as Henchman Luke Henderson
- Bill Potter as Henchman Perry

== Bibliography ==
- Drew, Bernard A. Motion Picture Series and Sequels: A Reference Guide. Routledge, 2013.
- Mayer, Geoff. Encyclopedia of American Film Serials. McFarland, 2017.
- Pitts, Michael R. Western Movies: A Guide to 5,105 Feature Films. McFarland, 2012.
