= The Lone Star Trail =

1943 film by Ray Taylor

- Directed by: Ray Taylor
- Screenplay by: Oliver Drake
- Story by: Victor Halperin
- Produced by: Oliver Drake
- Starring: Johnny Mack Brown; Tex Ritter
- Cinematography: William A. Sickner
- Edited by: Ray Snyder
- Production company: Universal Pictures
- Distributed by: Universal Pictures
- Release date: August 6, 1943
- Running time: 58 minutes
- Country: United States
- Language: English

The Lone Star Trail is a 1943 American Western film directed by Ray Taylor and starring Johnny Mack Brown and Tex Ritter. The supporting cast features Fuzzy Knight and Jennifer Holt and, in a small role as a villain, Robert Mitchum (billed as "Bob Mitchum"). The screenplay was written by Oliver Drake from a story by Victor Halperin. It was the last of 29 B-westerns Brown starred in for Universal beginning in 1939.

== Plot ==
A paroled convict (Johnny Mack Brown) returns to his home town to prove his innocence against the land-grabbing town elders who framed him for a stagecoach robbery. He's aided in his quest by his partner (Fuzzy Knight), girl friend (Jennifer Holt), and a new friend (Tex Ritter) who is a U.S. marshal traveling incognito.

== Cast ==
- Johnny Mack Brown as Blaze Barker
- Tex Ritter as Fargo Steele
- Fuzzy Knight as Angus MacAngus
- Jennifer Holt as Joan Winters
- George Eldredge as Doug Ransom
- Michael Vallon as Jonathan Bentley
- Harry Strang as Sheriff Waddell
- Earle Hodgins as Mayor Cyrus Jenkins
- Jack Ingram as Henchman Dan Jason
- Robert Mitchum as Ben Slocum (as Bob Mitchum)
- Ethan Laidlaw Steve Bannister
- Jimmy Wakely Trio as Musicians, Cowhands

== See also ==
- List of American films of 1943
