= Lillian Porter =

American actress

Lillian Mary Porter (February 24, 1917, Alameda County, California – February 1, 1997, San Bernardino, California) was an American film and television actress.

== Early years ==
Porter was born in Oakland, California, but raised and educated in Los Angeles. Out of a total of nine siblings (two of whom died in infancy), Porter was the middle child of seven, raised by Carmelita (née Adarga) and Alfred Porter.

Her work in mathematics was outstanding at Garfield High School. In 1940 she was a member of 20th Century Fox's school of drama.

== Career ==
An advertisement seeking dancers for a film resulted in Porter's signing with Twentieth Century-Fox. She graduated from that studio's stock school in 1939. Films in which she danced included Folies Bergere, Sing Baby Sing, and Pigskin Parade.

== Personal life and death ==
Porter married Clyde Cannon, her childhood sweetheart, when she was 17 years old. She married actor Russell Hayden on July 11, 1946, in Beverly Hills, California. In 1947 they went on tour across the United States, giving live performances. They remained married until his death in 1981, but apparently the union was childless.

After Hayden's death in 1981, Porter continued an annual event to raise money for a foundation that he had begun to help children who had serious health problems. The fund-raiser included food and entertainment and access to the Hayden Ranch, the only time the ranch was open to the public.

She died, aged 79, in February 1997, from undisclosed causes.
