= Ghost Town Renegades =

1947 film directed by Ray Taylor

- Theatrical release poster
- Directed by: Ray Taylor
- Screenplay by: Patricia Harper
- Produced by: Jerry Thomas
- Starring: Lash LaRue; Al St. John; Jennifer Holt; Jack Ingram; Terry Frost; Steve Clark
- Cinematography: Ernest Miller
- Edited by: Joseph Gluck
- Music by: Walter Greene
- Production company: Producers Releasing Corporation
- Distributed by: Producers Releasing Corporation; Eagle-Lion Films
- Release date: July 26, 1947
- Running time: 58 minutes
- Country: United States
- Language: English

Ghost Town Renegades is a 1947 American Western film directed by Ray Taylor and written by Patricia Harper. The film stars Lash LaRue, Al St. John, Jennifer Holt, Jack Ingram, Terry Frost and Steve Clark. The film was released on July 26, 1947, by Eagle-Lion Films.

== Cast ==
- Lash LaRue as Marshal Cheyenne Davis
- Al St. John as Fuzzy Q. Jones
- Jennifer Holt as Diane Trent
- Jack Ingram as Vance Sharp
- Terry Frost as Flint
- Steve Clark as Rodney Trent
- Lee Roberts as Luther Johnson
- Lane Bradford as Waco
- Henry Hall as Marshal Albert Jennings
- William Fawcett as Jonas Watson
- Dee Cooper as Henchman
- Wally West as Henchman
