= Range Renegades =

1948 film directed by Lambert Hillyer

- Theatrical release poster
- Directed by: Lambert Hillyer
- Screenplay by: Ronald Davidson; William Lively
- Produced by: Louis Gray
- Starring: Jimmy Wakely; Dub Taylor; Jennifer Holt; Riley Hill; Dennis Moore; John James
- Cinematography: Harry Neumann
- Edited by: Carl Pierson
- Production company: Monogram Pictures
- Distributed by: Monogram Pictures
- Release date: June 6, 1948
- Running time: 54 minutes
- Country: United States
- Language: English

Range Renegades is a 1948 American Western film directed by Lambert Hillyer and written by Ronald Davidson and William Lively. The film stars Jimmy Wakely, Dub Taylor, Jennifer Holt, Riley Hill, Dennis Moore, and John James. The film was released on June 6, 1948, by Monogram Pictures.

== Cast ==
- Jimmy Wakely as Jimmy Wakely
- Dub Taylor as Cannonball
- Jennifer Holt as Belle Morgan
- Riley Hill as Larry Jordan
- Dennis Moore as Burton
- John James as Kern
- Frank LaRue as Marshal Laramie Jordan
- Steve Clark as Mr. Harper
- Milburn Morante as Pop
- Bob Woodward as Strang
