= West to Glory =

1947 American western film

- Theatrical release poster
- Directed by: Ray Taylor
- Screenplay by: Elmer Clifton; Robert B. Churchill
- Produced by: Jerry Thomas
- Starring: Eddie Dean; Roscoe Ates; Dolores Castle; Gregg Barton; Jimmy Martin; Zon Murray; Alex Montoya; Harry J. Vejar; Casey MacGregor; Billy Hammond
- Cinematography: M.A. Andersen
- Edited by: Joseph Gluck
- Production company: Producers Releasing Corporation
- Distributed by: Producers Releasing Corporation
- Release date: April 12, 1947
- Running time: 61 minutes
- Country: United States
- Language: English

West to Glory is a 1947 American Western film directed by Ray Taylor and written by Elmer Clifton and Robert B. Churchill. The film stars Eddie Dean, Roscoe Ates, Dolores Castle, Gregg Barton, Jimmy Martin, Zon Murray, Alex Montoya, Harry J. Vejar, Casey MacGregor and Billy Hammond. The film was released on April 12, 1947, by Producers Releasing Corporation.

== Cast ==
- Eddie Dean as Eddie Dean
- Roscoe Ates as Soapy Jones
- Dolores Castle as Maria
- Gregg Barton as Jim Barrett
- Jimmy Martin as Cory
- Zon Murray as Bill Avery
- Alex Montoya as Juan
- Harry J. Vejar as Don Lopez
- Casey MacGregor as Henchman
- Billy Hammond as Henchman
- Ted French as Henchman
- Carl Mathews as Vincente
- Flash as Flash
