= The Tioga Kid =

1948 film directed by Ray Taylor

- Directed by: Ray Taylor
- Screenplay by: Ed Earl Repp
- Produced by: Jerry Thomas
- Starring: Eddie Dean; Roscoe Ates; Jennifer Holt; Dennis Moore; Lee Bennett; William Fawcett
- Cinematography: Ernest Miller
- Edited by: Hugh Winn
- Music by: Walter Greene
- Production company: Producers Releasing Corporation
- Distributed by: Eagle-Lion Films
- Release date: June 17, 1948
- Running time: 54 minutes
- Country: United States
- Language: English

The Tioga Kid is a 1948 American Western film directed by Ray Taylor and written by Ed Earl Repp. The film stars Eddie Dean, Roscoe Ates, Jennifer Holt, Dennis Moore, Lee Bennett and William Fawcett. The film was released on June 17, 1948, by Eagle-Lion Films.

== Cast ==
- Eddie Dean as Eddie Dean / The Tioga Kid
- Roscoe Ates as Soapy Jones
- Jennifer Holt as Jenny Morgan
- Dennis Moore as Joe Morino
- Lee Bennett as Tucson
- William Fawcett as Tennessee
- Eddie Parker as Clem
- Bob Woodward as Trigger
- Wylie Grant as Sam
- Terry Frost as Ranger Captain
- Andy Parker as Ranger Andy
- Flash as Eddie's Horse
