= Raiders of San Joaquin =

1943 film directed by Lewis D. Collins

- Theatrical release poster
- Directed by: Lewis D. Collins
- Screenplay by: Elmer Clifton; Morgan Cox
- Story by: Patricia Harper
- Produced by: Oliver Drake
- Starring: Johnny Mack Brown; Tex Ritter; Fuzzy Knight; Jennifer Holt; Henry Hall; Joseph E. Bernard
- Cinematography: William A. Sickner
- Edited by: Russell F. Schoengarth
- Production company: Universal Pictures
- Distributed by: Universal Pictures
- Release date: May 1, 1943
- Running time: 59 minutes
- Country: United States
- Language: English

Raiders of San Joaquin is a 1943 American Western film directed by Lewis D. Collins and written by Elmer Clifton and Morgan Cox. The film stars Johnny Mack Brown, Tex Ritter, Fuzzy Knight, Jennifer Holt, Henry Hall and Joseph E. Bernard. The film was released on May 1, 1943, by Universal Pictures.

== Cast ==
- Johnny Mack Brown as Rocky Morgan
- Tex Ritter as Gil Blake
- Fuzzy Knight as Eustace Clairmont
- Jennifer Holt as Jane Carter
- Henry Hall as Bodine Carter
- Joseph E. Bernard as Jim Blake
- George Eldredge as Gus Sloan
- Henry Roquemore as John Rogers
- John Elliott as Morgan
- Michael Vallon as Clark
- Jack O'Shea as Detective
- Jack Ingram as Lear
- Robert Thompson as Johnson
- Carl Sepulveda as Tanner
- Scoop Martin as Tripp
- Roy Brent as McQuarry
- Budd Buster as Deputy
