= Song of Old Wyoming =

1945 film

- Directed by: Robert Emmett Tansey
- Written by: Frances Kavanaugh (writer); Robert Emmett Tansey (story)
- Produced by: Robert Emmett Tansey
- Starring: Eddie Dean; Lash LaRue; Sarah Padden
- Cinematography: Marcel Le Picard
- Edited by: Hugh Winn
- Distributed by: Producers Releasing Corporation
- Release date: 12 October 1945
- Running time: 65 minutes
- Country: United States
- Language: English

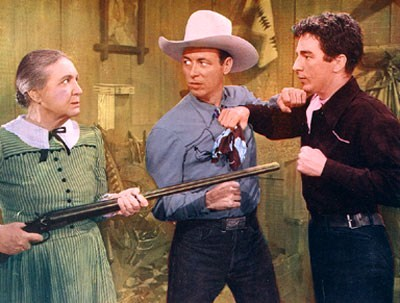
Sarah Padden, Eddie Dean, and Lash LaRue in Song of Old Wyoming (1945).

Song of Old Wyoming is a 1945 American Western film directed by Robert Emmett Tansey, written by Frances Kavanaugh from a story by Tansey. It was shot in Cinecolor and released by Producers Releasing Corporation. Western star Lash LaRue debuted in this film playing the Cheyenne Kid (Eddie Dean's sidekick in the film).

== Plot ==
The film's story concerns Wyoming statehood, or "the fight of the lawless crowd to keep the territory from becoming a state and the determined fight of the decent element" to achieve statehood, with "action, romance and thrills" in a scenic Western setting.

== Cast ==
- Eddie Dean as Eddie
- Sarah Padden as Kate 'Ma' Conway
- Ian Keith as Lee Landow
- Lash LaRue as Cheyenne Kid (billed as Al LaRue)
- Jennifer Holt as Vicky Conway, adopted
- Emmett Lynn as Uncle Ezra
- Robert Barron as Jesse Dixon
- Gene Alsace as Henchman Ringo
- Don Williams as Cowhand Slim – Musician
- Johnny Carpenter as Cowhand Buck
- Horace Murphy as Editor Timothy Meeks

== Soundtrack ==
- Eddie Dean – "Hills of Old Wyoming" (Written by Ralph Rainger and Leo Robin)
- Eddie Dean – "My Herdin' Song" (Written by Eddie Dean and Milt Mabie)
- Eddie Dean – "Wild Prairie Rose" (Written by Eddie Dean and Carl Hoefle)

== Reception ==
Wanda Hale of the New York Daily News called Song of Old Wyoming "a good, lusty, old-fashioned Western melodrama enhanced by soft, natural-color photography."
