= Glen Glenn (sound engineer) =

Canadian-American sound engineer (1907–1960)

- Born: Glen Percy Raymond Glenn; November 25, 1907; Chipman, New Brunswick, Canada
- Died: August 21, 1960 (aged 52) between Chipman and Minto, New Brunswick, Canada
- Occupation: Sound recordist
- Spouse: Mary Helen McCorkle (1954–1960; their death)
- Children: 4

Glen Percy Raymond Glenn (November 25, 1907 – August 21, 1960) was a Canadian-American sound engineer who settled in Los Angeles during the 1930s to pursue a career in movies.

== Biography ==
He was born in Chipman, New Brunswick, Canada, to parents Lionel Glenn and Adella Clarke. He immigrated to America in 1926. He settled in New York and became an electrical engineer. He went to Los Angeles in 1931.

Glenn was known for his involvement in the sound department of more than 300 movies and television shows. Some include the 1942 movie The Corpse Vanishes, the 1950s television shows I Love Lucy, The Millionaire, and The Life and Legend of Wyatt Earp. Glenn also co-founded the Glen Glenn Sound Company in 1937 with fellow engineer Harry Eckles. Glen Glenn Sound recorded for Monogram Studios in the 1940s,and eventually worked on the soundtracks of more than 20,000 motion pictures and television shows. The company was acquired by the audio post production company Todd-AO in 1986.

== Death ==
Glenn and his wife Mary Helen were both killed on August 21, 1960, in an automobile accident while vacationing in New Brunswick, Canada. Their car plunged off of a high dirt road and landed in the water of the Newcastle Creek in Queens County, New Brunswick, Canada. Glenn was 52 years old.

Glenn was survived by four children: Molly, Deanna, John David and James Lionel. Glen and Mary Helen have 6 grandchildren: Heather Taylor Dankowski, Glen Taylor, Robert Moore, Bruce Moore, Kylie Glenn Jenkins, and Ryan Glenn and nine great-grandchildren: Sarah, Melanie, Emily, Ian, Evan, Glenn, Megan, Jack, and Dean.

Glenn and his wife are buried in unmarked graves at Green Hills Memorial Park in Rancho Palos Verdes, California.
