= Hi, Buddy =

1943 American musical film directed by Harold Young

- Theatrical release poster
- Directed by: Harold Young
- Screenplay by: Warren Wilson
- Produced by: Paul Malvern
- Starring: Dick Foran; Harriet Nelson; Robert Paige; Marjorie Lord; Bobs Watson; Tommy Cook; Jennifer Holt; Gus Schilling
- Cinematography: John W. Boyle
- Edited by: Charles Maynard
- Music by: Charles Previn
- Production company: Universal Pictures
- Distributed by: Universal Pictures
- Release date: February 26, 1943
- Running time: 66 minutes
- Country: United States
- Language: English

Hi, Buddy is a 1943 American musical film directed by Harold Young and written by Warren Wilson. The film stars Dick Foran, Harriet Nelson, Robert Paige, Marjorie Lord, Bobs Watson, Tommy Cook, Jennifer Holt and Gus Schilling. The film was released on February 26, 1943, by Universal Pictures.

== Cast ==
- Dick Foran as Dave O'Connor
- Harriet Nelson as Gloria Bradley
- Robert Paige as Johnny Blake
- Marjorie Lord as Mary Parker
- Bobs Watson as Tim Martin
- Tommy Cook as Spud Winslow
- Jennifer Holt as Miss Lucille Russell
- Gus Schilling as Downbeat Collins
- Wade Boteler as Michael O'Shane
- Drew Roddy as Pat O'Shane
