= Jennifer Holt =

American actress (1920–1997)

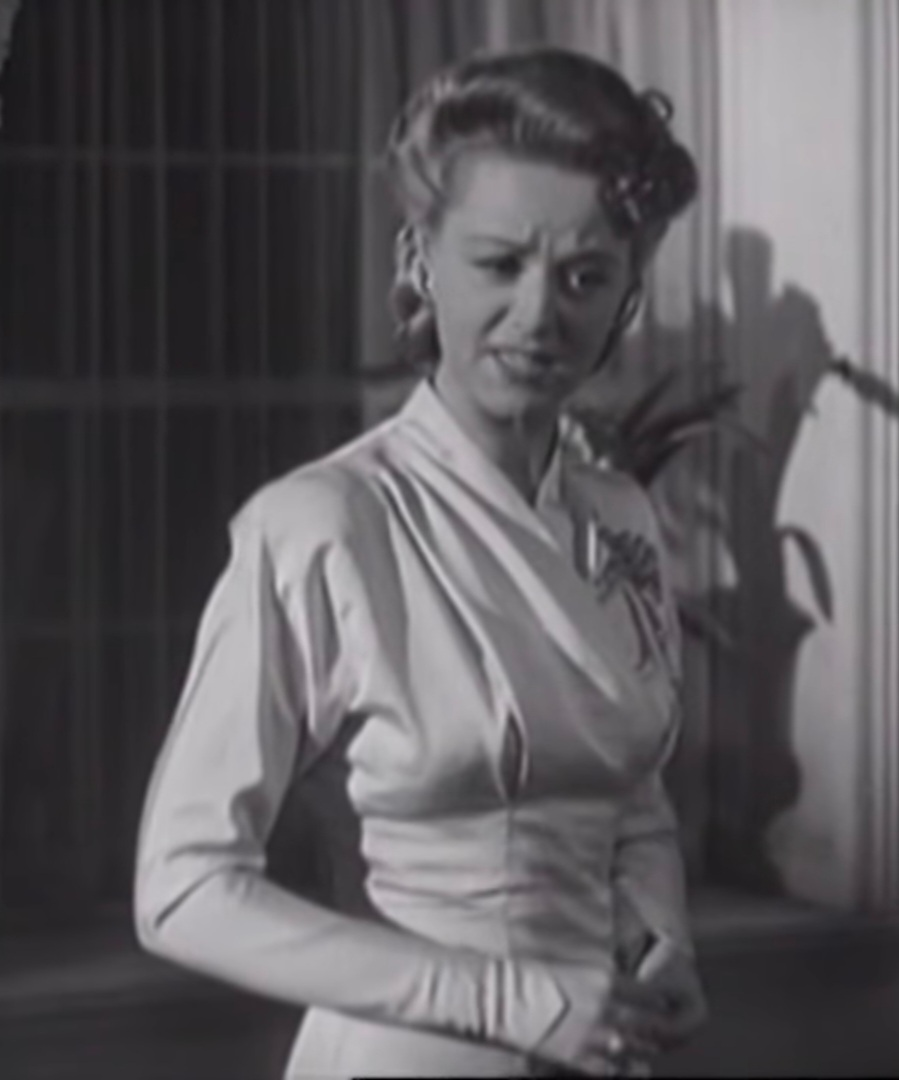
- Holt in Private Buckaroo (1942)
- Born: Elizabeth Randolph Holt; November 10, 1920; Hollywood, California, U.S.
- Died: September 21, 1997 (aged 76); Dorset, England, UK
- Other name: Jacqueline Holt
- Occupation: Actress
- Years active: 1941–1958
- Spouses: William M. Ritchey (m. 1943; div. 1944) William Bakewell (m. 1946; div. 1948) J. Hugh Davis (m. 1951): Aylmer Hughes Chamberlain (her death)
- Father: Jack Holt
- Relatives: Tim Holt (brother)

Jennifer Holt (born Elizabeth Randolph Holt; November 10, 1920 – September 21, 1997) was an American actress.

== Early years ==
Holt was born in Hollywood, California to actor Jack Holt and his wife, Margaret Woods. She was the sister of Western actor Tim Holt.

Her education included schooling at convents in Belgium, Santiago College in Chile, and The Bishop's School in La Jolla, California.

== Film ==
Holt made her film debut using the stage name Jacqueline Holt in a 1941 Western starring Hopalong Cassidy. A 1942 newspaper article reported, "Jennifer Holt ... has been signed to a long term contract with Universal." Her film singing debut came in Tenting Tonight on the Old Camp Ground in 1943. She sang Cielito Lindo while portraying an entertainer. She went on to make 47 films during the 1940s. All but eight of her roles were in Western films in which she appeared opposite cowboy stars such as Lash LaRue, Tex Ritter and Johnny Mack Brown.

Although the popularity of Western films had faded by the mid-1950s, during the 1970s Western film festivals became popular with fans of the genre and she occasionally participated as a guest.

== Television ==
After making her final film in 1949, in 1950 Holt co-hosted a television show called Panhandle Pete and Jennifer which ran for one season. During the remainder of the 1950s she made occasional guest appearances on television Western series such as The Gabby Hayes Show and Tales of Wells Fargo starring Dale Robertson.

== Recognition ==
In 1984, she received the Golden Boot Award for her contributions to Western cinema.

== Personal life ==
Holt was married various times, living for a while in Mexico. She had no children.

The marriages that can be confirmed were:

- November 19, 1943, to Marine Major William M. Ritchey in Yuma, Arizona. She sought a divorce after four months, and the divorce was granted on August 4, 1944.
- September 29, 1946, to William Bakewell. She filed suit for divorce from Bakewell on April 23, 1948. The divorce was granted June 10, 1948.
- March 2, 1951, to advertising executive J. Hugh Davis.
- Aylmer Hughes Chamberlain, her last husband, with whom she was living in England at the time of her death in 1997.

== Death ==
Holt was living in Dorset, England, with her husband, Aylmer Hughes Chamberlain, at the time of her death from cancer at age 76 in 1997.

== Partial filmography ==
- Stick to Your Guns (1941) .... June Winters (as Jacqueline Holt)
- Broadway (1942) .... TWA stewardess (uncredited)
- Private Buckaroo (1942) .... Joyce Mason
- The Silver Bullet (1942) .... Nancy Lee
- Pardon My Sarong (1942) .... Girl on bus with Tommy (uncredited)
- Deep in the Heart of Texas (1942) .... Nan Taylor
- Little Joe, the Wrangler (1942) .... Janet Hammond
- The Old Chisholm Trail (1942) .... Mary Lee
- Tenting Tonight on the Old Camp Ground (1943) .... Kay Randolph
- Hi, Buddy (1943) .... Miss Russell
- Cheyenne Roundup (1943) .... Ellen Randall
- Raiders of San Joaquin (1943) .... Jane Carter
- Cowboy in Manhattan (1943) .... Mitzi
- Get Going (1943) .... Vilma Walters
- Frontier Law (1943) .... Lois Rodgers
- Hers to Hold (1943) .... Girl (uncredited)
- The Lone Star Trail (1943) .... Joan Winters
- Adventures of the Flying Cadets (1943, Serial) .... Andre Mason [Chs. 5-13]
- Raiders of Sunset Pass (1943) .... Betty Mathews
- Marshal of Gunsmoke (1944) .... Ellen Carey
- Oklahoma Raiders (1944) .... Donna Ross, a.k.a. El Vengador
- Guns of the Law (1944) .... Lillian Wilkins
- Riders of the Santa Fe (1944) .... Carla Anderson
- The Navajo Trail (1945) .... Mary Trevor
- Under Western Skies (1945) .... Charity
- Gun Smoke (1945) .... Jane Condon
- Beyond the Pecos (1945) .... Ellen Tanner
- Renegades of the Rio Grande (1945) .... Dolores Salezar
- Song of Old Wyoming (1945) .... Vicky Conway, adopted
- The Lost Trail (1945) .... Jane Burns
- Moon Over Montana (1946) .... Gwynn Randal
- Hop Harrigan (1946) .... Gail Nolan
- Trigger Fingers (1946) .... Jane Caldwell
- Over the Santa Fe Trail (1947) .... Carolyn
- Buffalo Bill Rides Again (1947) .... Dale Harrington
- Pioneer Justice (1947) .... Betty Walters
- Ghost Town Renegades (1947) .... Diane Trent
- Stage to Mesa City (1947) .... Margie Watson
- The Fighting Vigilantes (1947) .... Abby Jackson
- Shadow Valley (1947) .... Mary Ann Jarvis
- Where the North Begins (1947, Short) .... Mary Rockwell
- Trail of the Mounties (1947) .... Kathie McBain
- Tornado Range (1948) .... Mary King
- The Hawk of Powder River (1948) .... Vivian Chambers a.k.a. The Hawk
- Range Renegades (1948) .... Belle Morgan
- The Tioga Kid (1948) .... Jenny Morgan
- Tales of Wells Fargo (1957–1959, TV Series) .... Ella
- Perry Mason (1958, TV Series) .... Christine
