= Border Feud =

1947 film

- Theatrical release poster
- Directed by: Ray Taylor
- Screenplay by: Patricia Harper
- Story by: Joseph O'Donnell
- Produced by: Jerry Thomas
- Starring: Lash LaRue; Al St. John; Ian Keith; Gloria Marlen; Kenneth Farrell; Ed Cassidy; Bob Duncan; Casey MacGregor; Buster Slaven
- Cinematography: M.A. Andersen
- Edited by: Joseph Gluck
- Production company: Producers Releasing Corporation
- Distributed by: Producers Releasing Corporation
- Release date: May 10, 1947
- Running time: 55 minutes
- Country: United States
- Language: English

Border Feud is a 1947 American Western film directed by Ray Taylor and written by Patricia Harper. The film stars Lash LaRue, Al St. John, Ian Keith, Gloria Marlen, Kenneth Farrell, Ed Cassidy, Bob Duncan, Casey MacGregor and Buster Slaven. The film was released on May 10, 1947, by Producers Releasing Corporation.

== Cast ==
- Lash LaRue as Marshal Cheyenne Davis
- Al St. John as Sheriff Fuzzy Q. Jones
- Ian Keith as Doc Peters
- Gloria Marlen as Carol Condon
- Kenneth Farrell as Bob Hart
- Ed Cassidy as Sheriff Steele
- Bob Duncan as Jack Barton
- Casey MacGregor as Jed Young
- Buster Slaven as Jim Condon
- Mikel Conrad as Elmore
