= Raiders of Sunset Pass =

1943 film directed by John English

Raiders of Sunset Pass is a 1943 American Western film directed by John English with a screenplay by John K. Butler.

== Plot ==
In Texas during World War II, most of the able-bodied men of military age are away fighting for the United States. A gang of cattle rustlers, led by Henry Judson and Lefty Lewis, decide to take advantage of the situation by stealing from rancher Dad Mathews and other cattle farmers. Texas Ranger Johnny Revere and his sidekick Frog Millhouse arrive to handle the situation. With some help from Mathews' daughter, Betty, they manage to win in the end.

== Cast ==
- Eddie Dew as Johnny Revere
- Smiley Burnette as Frog Millhouse
- Jennifer Holt as Betty Mathews
- LeRoy Mason as Henry Judson
- Roy Barcroft as Lefty Lewis
- Charles F. Miller as Rancher Mathews
- Maxine Doyle as Sally Meehan
