= Pioneer Justice =

1947 film directed by Ray Taylor

- Directed by: Ray Taylor
- Screenplay by: Joseph F. Poland
- Produced by: Jerry Thomas
- Starring: Lash La Rue; Al St. John; Jennifer Holt
- Cinematography: James S. Brown Jr.
- Edited by: Hugh Winn
- Music by: Walter Greene
- Production company: Producers Releasing Corporation
- Distributed by: Producers Releasing Corporation
- Release date: June 28, 1947
- Running time: 56 minutes
- Country: United States
- Language: English

Pioneer Justice is a 1947 American Western film directed by Ray Taylor and starring Lash La Rue, Al St. John, and Jennifer Holt. The film was released by Producers Releasing Corporation on June 28, 1947. The film was shot at the Iverson Movie Ranch.

== Plot ==
Cheyenne and Fuzzy help Betty Walters keep her ranch against a mysterious villain, his gang of henchmen and a crooked sheriff by dispensing justice.

== Cast ==
- Lash La Rue as Cheyenne Davis (as 'Lash' La Rue)
- Al St. John as Fuzzy Jones (as Al 'Fuzzy' St. John)
- Jennifer Holt as Betty Walters
- William Fawcett as Uncle Bob
- Jack Ingram as Bill Judd
- Terry Frost as Gambler Grayson
- Dee Cooper as Criler
- Lane Bradford as Joe
- Henry Hall as Sheriff Peters
- Steve Drake as Al Walters
- Slim Whitaker as the Bartender
- Bob Woodward as Deputy Jackson
- Wally West ... Buck Crowder
