= Stage to Mesa City =

1947 film directed by Ray Taylor

- Theatrical release poster
- Directed by: Ray Taylor
- Screenplay by: Joseph F. Poland
- Produced by: Jerry Thomas
- Starring: Lash La Rue; Al St. John; Jennifer Holt; George Chesebro; Buster Slaven; Marshall Reed
- Cinematography: James S. Brown Jr.
- Edited by: Hugh Winn
- Music by: Walter Greene
- Production company: Producers Releasing Corporation
- Distributed by: Producers Releasing Corporation
- Release date: September 13, 1947
- Running time: 56 minutes
- Country: United States
- Language: English

Stage to Mesa City is a 1947 American Western film directed by Ray Taylor and starring Lash La Rue, Al St. John, Jennifer Holt, George Chesebro, Buster Slaven, and Marshall Reed. The film was released by Producers Releasing Corporation on September 13, 1947.

== Plot ==
John Watson is in financial difficulties because bandits are repeatedly holding up the coaches on his stage line, and his only hope is to get a mail contract but the bandits have to be stopped. His lawyer, Alan Baxter, tells him that the sheriff refuses to help. U.S. Marshal Cheyenne Davis and his pal Fuzzy Jones are sent to investigate. They arrive just as Watson has been attacked by the bandits, and he dies in Cheyenne's arms after asking him to meet his daughter Margie and son Bob, who are arriving in town with the cash needed to keep the stage line afloat. After Cheyenne and Fuzzy save them from being robbed by the outlaws, Margie and Bob make Cheyenne their business manager. Cheyenne makes the rounds of Mesa City and meets postmaster Tom Padgett, who is paralyzed. Following a failed attempt to get the stage through, Cheyenne begins to suspect Baxter but the latter is killed before Cheyenne can question him. A trap to capture the outlaws fails, but one of them loses a heel from his shoe. Cheyenne goes to see Padgett and notices some mud on the floor. He removes the blanket from around Padgett's legs and discovers that the heel from one of his shoes is missing. Padgett leaps from his chair and attacks Cheynne, but is knocked out and disclosed as the leader of the outlaw gang.

== Cast ==
- Lash La Rue as Cheyenne Davis (as 'Lash' La Rue)
- Al St. John as Fuzzy Jones (as Al 'Fuzzy' St. John)
- Jennifer Holt as Margie Watson
- George Chesebro as Tom Padgett
- Buster Slaven as Bob Watson (as Brad Slaven)
- Marshall Reed as Lawyer Baxter
- Terry Frost as Henchman Ed Williams
- Carl Mathews as Henchman Jim
- Bob Woodward as Stage Driver Pete
- Steve Clark as John Watson
- Frank Ellis as Stocker
- Lee Morgan as Sheriff
- Russell Arms as Postal Inspector Hardy (uncredited)
- Roy Bucko as Henchman (uncredited)
- Dee Cooper as Henchman (uncredited)
- Rube Dalroy as Townsman (uncredited)
- Jack Evans as Townsman (uncredited)
- Kit Guard as Barfly (uncredited)
- Herman Hack as Townsman (uncredited)
- George Huggins as Townsman (uncredited)
- Wally West as Henchman (uncredited)
