= Elizabeth Beecher =

American screenwriter

- Born: February 19, 1898; Bridgeport, Connecticut, USA
- Died: March 8, 1973 (aged 75); Burbank, California, USA
- Education: Syracuse University
- Occupation: Screenwriter

Elizabeth Beecher was an American screenwriter best known for her work on Western-themed movies and television shows in the 1940s and 1950s.

== Early life ==
Beecher was born in Bridgeport, Connecticut, and is a descendant of Harriet Beecher Stowe, author of the book Uncle Tom's Cabin. She graduated from Syracuse University in 1920 with majors in English and history.

== Career ==
Beecher worked as a news reporter and writer for the Syracuse Journal, San Francisco Chronicle, and the New York American. She moved to Hollywood in 1937, where she took up work as a freelance writer. She began writing screenplays for Western film producers as well as television shows such as Lassie and The Gene Autry Show.

Outside of film, Beecher wrote comic and children's books, including adaptions of Twenty Thousand Leagues Under the Seas and Tonka for the Walt Disney Company. Additional writings included a cookbook of early American family recipes, seven Little Golden Books, four Big Golden Books, and The Bar-Twenty Cowboy, a book selected for inclusion in the Children's Library at the British Museum. She also rewrote or ghost wrote more than 100 manuscripts.

== Filmography ==
=== Television ===
- The Cisco Kid (various)

=== Movies ===
- Bullets and Saddles, 1943 (writer)
- Rough Riders of Cheyenne, 1945 (writer)

== Personal life ==
Beecher died on March 3, 1973, in Burbank, California. She was survived by her son, Guy Snowden Miller; her sister, Dorothy Shidler; her grandson, Gene; and her granddaughter, Kerry.
