= Man of Courage =

1943 film by Alexis Thurn-Taxis

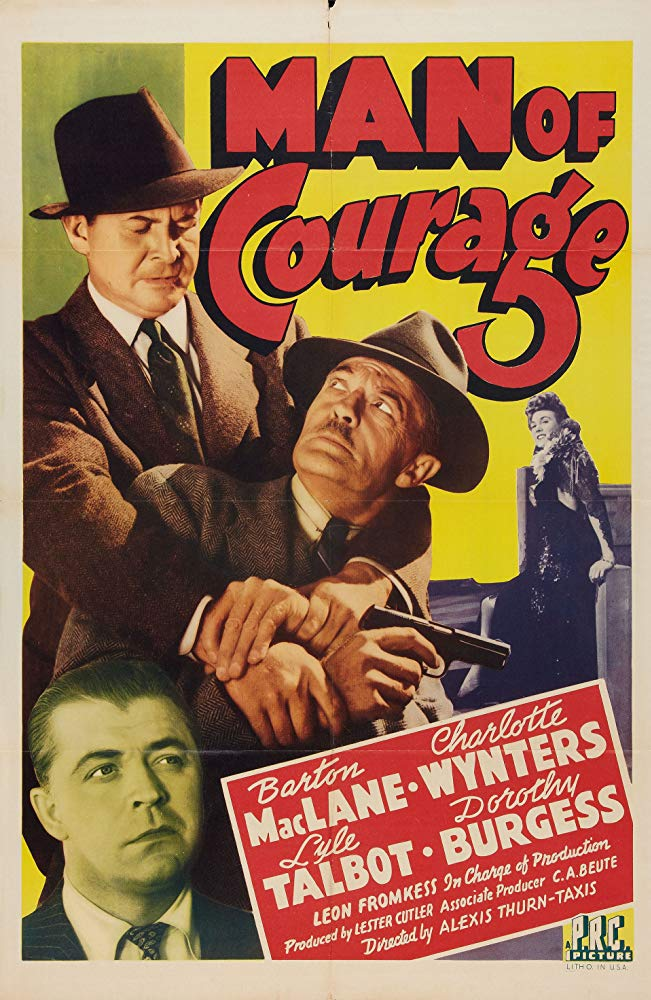
- Theatrical release poster
- Directed by: Alexis Thurn-Taxis
- Screenplay by: Arthur St. Claire; Barton MacLane; John Vlahos
- Story by: Barton MacLane; Herman Ruby; Lew Pollack
- Produced by: Lester Cutler
- Starring: Barton MacLane; Charlotte Wynters; Lyle Talbot; Dorothy Burgess; Patsy Nash; Forrest Taylor
- Cinematography: Marcel Le Picard
- Edited by: Fred Bain
- Production company: Producers Releasing Corporation
- Distributed by: Producers Releasing Corporation
- Release date: January 4, 1943
- Running time: 66 minutes
- Country: United States
- Language: English

Man of Courage is a 1943 American crime film directed by Alexis Thurn-Taxis and written by Arthur St. Claire, Barton MacLane and John Vlahos. The film stars Barton MacLane, Charlotte Wynters, Lyle Talbot, Dorothy Burgess, Patsy Nash and Forrest Taylor. The film was released on January 4, 1943, by Producers Releasing Corporation.

== Cast ==
- Barton MacLane as John Wallace
- Charlotte Wynters as Joyce Griffith
- Lyle Talbot as George Dickson
- Dorothy Burgess as Sally Dickson
- Patsy Nash as Mary Ann
- Forrest Taylor as Mark Crandall
- John Ince as Tom Haines
- Jane Novak as Mrs. Black
- Erskine Johnson as himself
- Claire Grey as Alice
- Steve Clark as Judge Roberts
- Billy Gray as Mike Wilson
- Frank Yaconelli as Pete
