= Russell Hayden =

American actor (1912–1981)

Russell "Lucky" Hayden
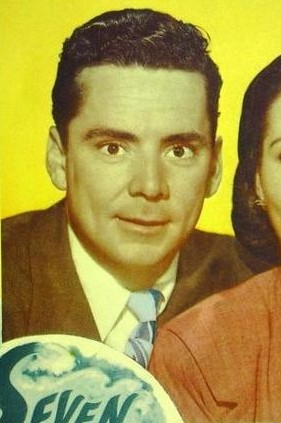
- Hayden in Seven Were Saved (1947)
- Born: Hayden Michael Lucid; June 12, 1912; Chico, California, U.S.
- Died: June 9, 1981 (aged 68); Palm Springs, California, U.S.
- Resting place: Oakwood Memorial Park Cemetery, Chatsworth, California
- Occupation: Actor
- Years active: 1937–1963
- Spouses: Jan Clayton (m. 1938; div. 1943) Lillian Porter (m. 1946)
- Children: 1

Russell "Lucky" Hayden (born Hayden Michael "Pate" Lucid; June 12, 1912 – June 9, 1981) was an American film and television actor. He is best known for his portrayal as Lucky Jenkins in Paramount's popular Hopalong Cassidy film series.

== Early life ==
He was born as Hayden Michael "Pate" Lucid, son of Francis J. Lucid and the former Minnie Harvey. He later took the name Russell Hayden to honor a friend, the cameraman Russell Harlan.

== Career ==
Hayden's screen debut was in Hills of Old Wyoming (1937), a Hopalong Cassidy film. In 27 films, he played Lucky Jenkins, one of a trio of heroes in the Cassidy Westerns starring William Boyd.

In 1941 Columbia Pictures hired Hayden to appear with its leading cowboy star Charles Starrett in eight Westerns. After this apprenticeship, Columbia gave Hayden his own series of starring Westerns. In 1946, he joined Robert L. Lippert's Screen Guild Productions, and played a country parson in the harness racing drama Rolling Home. He played both the main hero and villain in the film Trail of the Mounties. In 1948 Hayden teamed with another Hopalong Cassidy alumnus, James Ellison (as "Lucky" and "Shamrock") in a series of Western features for Lippert.

In 1950, Hayden appeared as "Marshal #1" in several episodes of the live-broadcast and short-lived ABC series The Marshal of Gunsight Pass.

In the 1952–1953 season, Hayden teamed with former child star Jackie Coogan in the 39-episode syndicated series Cowboy G-Men.

In the late 1950s, Hayden produced and directed through his Quintet Productions two syndicated Western series, 26 Men, black-and-white program starring Tristram Coffin, and Judge Roy Bean, a color production, with Edgar Buchanan, Jack Buetel, and Jackie Loughery. Hayden also appeared himself as Steve, a Texas Ranger, in twelve episodes of Judge Roy Bean, a family-oriented program considered at odds with the real Roy Bean.

Hayden and fellow Western actor Dick Curtis helped to develop Pioneertown, a Western movie set near Palm Springs, which has been used in Western films and television episodes.

== Marriages, death, and burial ==
Hayden was married from 1938 to 1943 to actress Jan Clayton, who was later cast as the first mother on the Lassie television series on CBS. The couple had a daughter, Sandra Hayden (1940–1956). In 1946 Hayden wed screen actress Lillian Porter, who retired from pictures. The Haydens remained happily married until his death on June 9, 1981, three days before his 69th birthday.

Hayden is interred at Oakwood Memorial Park Cemetery in Chatsworth, California.
