= Eddie Dean (singer) =

American singer-songwriter

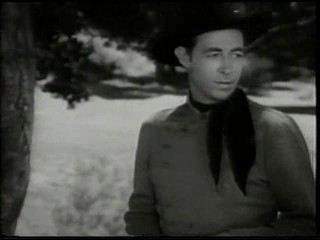
- Dean in Stars Over Texas, 1946
- Born: Edgar Dean Glosup; July 9, 1907; Posey, Texas, US
- Died: March 4, 1999 (aged 91); Westlake Village, Los Angeles County, California, US
- Resting place: Valley Oaks Memorial Park, Westlake Village, California
- Occupations: Singer, songwriter, actor
- Spouse: Lorene Donnelly "Dearest" Dean (1911–2002, married 1930–1999, his death)
- Children: Donna Lee Daniel; Ed Glosup

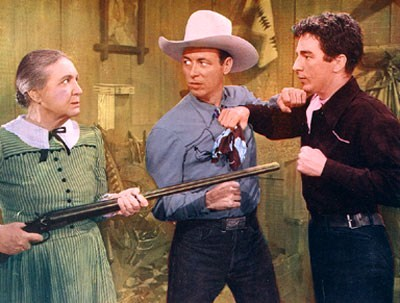
Sarah Padden, Eddie Dean, and Lash LaRue in Song of Old Wyoming (1945).

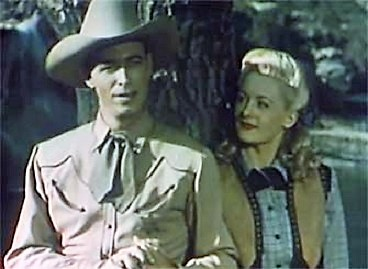
Eddie Dean and Virginia Maples in Wildfire (1945)

Eddie Dean (born Edgar Dean Glosup; July 9, 1907 – March 4, 1999) was an American Western singer and actor. His smooth baritone impressed both Roy Rogers and Gene Autry, who considered Dean the best cowboy singer of all time.

Eddie Dean's show-business career began in 1937, as a radio singer. Within the year Republic Pictures, a producer of low-budget western and action feature films, hired him to play incidental roles. He also joined the Hopalong Cassidy production team in 1938, and appeared in many Paramount westerns. Beginning in 1941, producers took notice of Dean's singing voice and gave him specialty numbers.

In 1944 producer Walt Mattox hired Eddie Dean to support cowboy star Ken Maynard in the low-budget feature Harmony Trail. This led to producer Robert Emmett Tansey approaching Dean to star in a radically new series of westerns, to be released by PRC. These would be the first budget westerns to be filmed in then-unusual Cinecolor. The Eddie Dean series was immediately successful, with the added novelty of color attracting much attention among theater owners. Dean's first three starring vehicles featured Lash LaRue, who soon graduated to his own series.

In 1947 the PRC studio was absorbed by Eagle-Lion Films, which continued to use the PRC brand name for its westerns. Under Eagle-Lion the budgets became smaller and smaller: color film was forsaken in favor of ordinary black-and-white film, and many of the action scenes were lifted from older pictures, with Dean appearing in much fewer new scenes. The series limped to its conclusion with The Tioga Kid (1948), with Dean and some of the supporting cast members dressed to match their appearances in an older film. The Tioga Kid used so much old, out-of-context footage of Eddie Dean that the script explained it away as being Dean's twin brother! Despite the economies, Eddie Dean remained a popular western personality, starring in 20 features. (His 1944 feature Harmony Trail was re-released in 1947 to capitalize on his new movie fame, with Dean now billed as the star and the film retitled White Stallion.)

Attempts to further his screen career were unsuccessful. In 1950 he starred in two half-hour experiments for an early TV series, The Marshal of Gunsight Pass; these were unusual in that they were broadcast live, and any mistakes went out over the air. Movie producer Ron Ormond gave Dean a specialty number in his vaudeville revue Varieties on Parade in 1951, but no further work was forthcoming.

Like many singing cowboys no longer working in pictures, Eddie Dean became a recording artist. He scored three hits on the US Country charts. "One Has My Name (The Other Has My Heart)" peaked at number 11 in 1948 and "I Dreamed of a Hill-Billy Heaven" peaked at number 10 in 1955. Dean co-wrote both songs. Dean charted again with the song "Way Out Yonder" in 1955.

== Personal life ==
In 1931 Dean married Lorene Donally, whom he always called Dearest. They had 2 children and remained married for 68 years until his death.

He died on March 4, 1999 in Thousands Oaks, California from heart and lung disease.
