= Ray Taylor (director) =

American film director (1888–1952)

- Born: 1 December 1888; Perham, Minnesota, United States
- Died: 15 February 1952 (aged 63); Hollywood, California, United States
- Occupation: Film director
- Years active: 1926–1949

Raymond Edgar Taylor (1 December 1888 – 15 February 1952) was an American film director. He directed 159 films between 1926 and 1949. His debut was the 1926 film serial Fighting with Buffalo Bill.

Ray Taylor was one of the few Hollywood directors who specialized in a single type of film: he was an action specialist. Many action directors would be called upon at one time or another to direct a mainstream drama, romance, or mystery, but Ray Taylor established himself early in westerns and action fare, and he worked in this capacity throughout his career. Even a brief tenure directing the campus-capers "Collegians" shorts for Universal was appropriate for Taylor, as these two-reel subjects often emphasized visual action.

In the 1920s he worked for Fox as an assistant, and soon moved to Universal, where he was given a chance to direct. His effective staging of action scenes earned him a permanent berth at Universal, where he was entrusted with the studio's popular westerns and serials. The project that won Taylor the most notice was Flash Gordon, the Buster Crabbe serial that was phenomenally successful in theaters; unlike most serials that were reserved for weekend juvenile matinees, Flash Gordon played to adult audiences on weeknights alongside prestigious feature films.

Taylor's success with Flash Gordon earned him an invitation to direct serials for Republic Pictures, but his stay was short. Taylor's assistant, William Witney, recalled in his 1996 memoir that Taylor had a drinking problem, which caused him to miss too much work. This was inexcusable on Republic's tight production schedules, and Witney was promoted to full-time director, replacing Taylor.

Taylor's reputation for quality work took precedence over his personal problem, and in 1938 he joined Columbia's new serial unit to co-direct The Spider's Web with James W. Horne. Taylor and Horne joined forces to create one of the best serials of all time; it was easily the most popular serial of 1938, according to a tally of theater bookings. Taylor's Columbia stay was also relatively brief; he returned to his home base at Universal.

Universal kept Taylor extremely busy with westerns and serials for the next six years. Perhaps his best Universal serial is Gang Busters, an action-packed police procedural and, like Flash Gordon, a bid for adult audiences. When Universal had a change of management in 1946, it discontinued its "B" pictures, westerns, and serials, leaving Taylor idle.

For the rest of his career Ray Taylor worked in the movies' minor leagues, making western features for PRC (which shut down in 1947) and Monogram Pictures. He retired in 1949 and died in 1952.

== Selected filmography ==
- Son of Billy the Kid (1949)
- Hidden Danger (1948)
- Stage to Mesa City (1947)
- Law of the Lash (1947)
- Shadow Valley (1947)
- Black Hills (1947)
- Return of the Lash (1947)
- Lost City of the Jungle (1946)
- The Scarlet Horseman (1946)
- The Royal Mounted Rides Again (1945)
- Secret Agent X-9 (1945)
- The Master Key (1945)
- Jungle Queen (1945)
- Mystery of the River Boat (1944)
- Raiders of Ghost City (1944)
- Adventures of the Flying Cadets (1943)
- The Lone Star Trail (1943)
- The Adventures of Smilin' Jack (1943)
- Don Winslow of the Coast Guard (1943)
- Junior G-Men of the Air (1942)
- Gang Busters (1942, co-director, with Noel M. Smith))
- Don Winslow of the Navy (1942)
- Treat 'Em Rough (1942)
- Law and Order (1940)
- Flash Gordon Conquers the Universe (1940)
- Flying G-Men (1939, co-director, with James W. Horne)
- Rawhide (1938)
- Frontier Town (1938)
- The Spider's Web (1938, co-director, with James W. Horne)
- Boss of Lonely Valley (1937)
- The Three Mesquiteers (1936)
- Chandu on the Magic Island (1935)
- The Return of Chandu (1934)
- Heroes of the West (1932)
- Battling with Buffalo Bill (1931)
- The Ace of Scotland Yard (1929)
- The Ridin' Demon (1929)
- The Pirate of Panama (1929)
- Tarzan the Mighty (1928)
- The Avenging Shadow (1928)
- A Final Reckoning (1928)
- The Vanishing Rider (1928)
- Whispering Smith Rides (1927)
- Fighting with Buffalo Bill (1926)
