= Carmen Nigro =

American chef

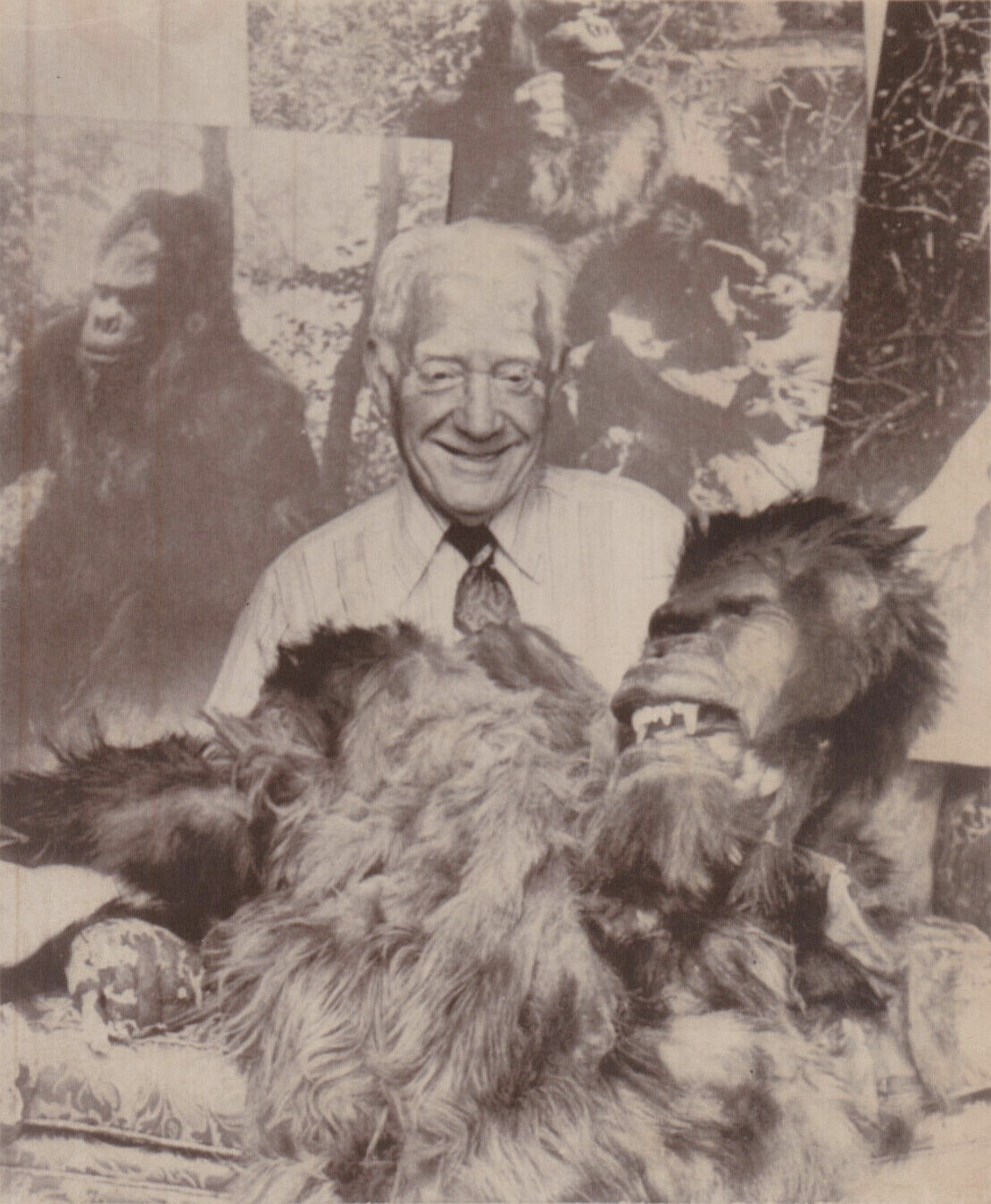
- Nigro in 1976
- Born: October 10, 1905; Chicago, Illinois, USA
- Died: September 24, 1990 (aged 84); Speedway, Indiana, USA
- Other name: Ken Roady
- Known for: Disputed claims of career as a Hollywood stuntman

Carmen Nigro (October 10, 1905 – September 24, 1990) was an American chef who professed to have worked for three decades as a Hollywood stuntman under the professional name Ken Roady. From 1969 he gained notability through media interviews in which he announced he had acted in a gorilla suit in many Hollywood films, most famously as the title role in the 1933 classic King Kong. While Nigro's claims were accepted as fact by some journalists and authors during his lifetime, film historians generally have disputed his account, and regard him as an impostor.

== Alleged Hollywood career ==
In 1969, Nigro came forward with his account of having acted in a gorilla suit in King Kong (1933). He was quoted in the Chicago Sun Times under an alias, Ken Roady, as saying that he "got paid $150 a week and never could get along with either Fay Wray or Robert Armstrong, who were the stars of the picture." In 1976, when the remake of King Kong was in production, Nigro attracted much media attention as "the man who was known for 25 years as the Hollywood Apeman." His alleged participation in the original King Kong and other films was reported on by journalist Bob Greene:

"They used an animated doll for most of the sequences of the gorilla," Nigro said ... "But for all of the scenes where they needed someone to act like a real gorilla – that was me. It was me on top of the Empire State Building, for example." ... Nigro said that King Kong wasn't the only gorilla he played in the movies... "I spent all that money to have my suit made. It took six bear skins to make it and it cost me $3500. I only made $7000 for King Kong. I was also in Mighty Joe Young, Tarzan of the Apes, Tarzan and His Mate, Ape Man – I played gorillas in about 25 or 30 movies. But I made about 133 movies in all, as a stunt man. There was a fellow in Hollywood named Charles Gearmer [sic] who wanted the part, but he wasn't very good at being a gorilla. He was more like a chimpanzee or an orangutan. Then there was another fellow, name of Van Horn, who wanted the part. But I got it because I had a better costume to begin with and I knew how to act like a gorilla better. I had been to Africa with Frank Buck, the great animal hunter, and I knew how an ape walked."

== Controversy ==
Nigro's claims were widely accepted at face value by the lay media during his lifetime, notably by journalist Bob Greene, who interviewed Nigro on at least three occasions, and reported on his death in 1990. However, professional film critics have remarked that no evidence exists of Nigro's Hollywood career other than his own assertions, and have generally rejected his claims as spurious or unverifiable.

The consensus of film historians is that the giant ape in King Kong was an animated model created by special-effects expert Willis O'Brien. Donald F. Glut wrote that "there was no human actor inside a gorilla costume playing the colossal simian... in Nigro's case the claim seems to have been simply fraudulent." Author James Van Hise referred to Nigro as "the Counterfeit Kong," and quoted surviving cast and crew members of King Kong who repudiated Nigro's claims, including Fay Wray and production assistant Zoe Porter.

Critics have also commented that the other cinematic ape roles allegedly played by Nigro are documented to have been animated models (Mighty Joe Young), or were performed by known stuntmen such as Charles Gemora (The Unholy Three), Ray Corrigan (Tarzan and His Mate, Nabonga), Emil Van Horn (The Ape Man), and George Barrows (Gorilla at Large).

== Personal life ==
In newspaper interviews Nigro said he had worked as a rodeo cowboy in his youth. Sources indicate that he worked as a dining-car chef on the Santa Fe Railway for 32 years, retiring from that role in 1970. He then worked as a security guard for a Chicago insurance company. In 1983 it was reported that had disposed of his gorilla suit because it had developed mildew and his wife Evelyn was allergic to it. (However, a 1990 obituary reported that Nigro had bequeathed the head of the costume to a nephew.) During his retirement he also addressed schools and Boy Scout meetings about his alleged participation in King Kong.

=== Death ===
Nigro died in Speedway, Indiana, on September 24, 1990, aged 84.
