= Emil Van Horn =

American actor

- Born: October 3, 1907; Ridgway, Pennsylvania, U.S.
- Died: February 15, 1967 (aged 59); New Orleans, Louisiana, U.S.
- Occupation: Actor

Emil Van Horn (October 3, 1907 – February 15, 1967) was an American stuntman and actor. Together with Charles Gemora, Ray Corrigan, Steve Calvert, and George Barrows, he was known as one of Hollywood's "Gorilla Men" – performers who wore a gorilla suit to portray apes on stage and screen. Among the films he appeared in were The Ape Man (1943) with Bela Lugosi, Never Give a Sucker an Even Break (1941) with W.C. Fields, and the adventure serials Jungle Girl (1941) and Perils of Nyoka (1942).

== Early life ==
Sources indicate that Emil Imra Van Horn was born October 3, 1907, in Ridgway, Pennsylvania, one of the six children of Joseph Van Horn and Elizabeth Lind, immigrants from Austria-Hungary. Joseph Van Horn was an industrial machinist who altered his family's surname from Horansky to Van Horn after becoming a naturalized U.S. citizen. (Note: U.S. sources variously spell the family's surname as Vanhorn, (Van) Horn(e), Horansky, Horensky, Hornsky, or Horan ; Emil's birth was in fact registered under the last-named variant. Some sources spell his given name as "Emile".) By the 1930s, Emil Van Horn owned a number of concession stands with his younger brother, Arvine.

== Performing career ==
Van Horn was a diminutive man who had trained as a circus tumbler and acrobat. He stated in interviews that after meeting noted Hollywood gorilla impersonator Charles Gemora, he decided to construct his own gorilla costume, and studied the behavior of gorillas donated to San Diego Zoo by Martin and Osa Johnson.

From 1933, he appeared in stage productions such as A Night of Terror and Murder at Midnight as "King Kivu", "Engagi", or "Ingagi" (the latter being the name of a 1930 gorilla movie which had featured Charles Gemora). He also performed at the 1939 New York World's Fair. His most prominent film role was probably The Ape Man (1943), supporting Bela Lugosi. Variety 's review remarked that "Emil Van Horn makes a very sympathetic gorilla." His other significant big-screen ape roles were the Republic serials Jungle Girl (1941) and Perils of Nyoka (1942). He also featured in Never Give a Sucker an Even Break and Keep 'Em Flying (both 1941) as a gorilla who surprises W.C. Fields and Lou Costello, respectively. With the exception of The Ape Man, Van Horn was rarely credited on screen, leading to some uncertainty over the precise number of films in which he appeared.

Van Horn also performed in burlesque stage shows with a "Beauty and the Beast" theme, and focused on this work after film offers waned; his final confirmed screen gorilla role was 1948's Are You With It? In 1950, he made a public appearance (in costume) at Chicago's Lincoln Park Zoo as part of birthday celebrations for the zoo's gorilla, Bushman. After a legal copyright dispute in 1951 over his use of the name "Ingagi", he adopted another stage name, "Tomba", including a tour of Canada later that year.

== Personal life ==
Few details are known about Van Horn's private life compared to his fellow "Gorilla Men", and he rarely permitted the media to photograph him out of costume. It is documented that in 1937, he married fortune-teller "Gypsy" Vilma Horvath in New York City, and in 1944 the couple opened a nightclub on upper Broadway called The Golden Fiddle. Their marriage appears to have ended by March 1950, when it was announced that Van Horn and his Chicago burlesque stage partner, Carol Borgia (variously Karol Borja), were engaged to be married. However, the following month Borgia brought a charge of disorderly conduct against Van Horn. Although the charge was dismissed, Van Horn was ordered by the court to sign a $1,000 peace bond. Newspaper coverage of the incident – which arose from a curious argument regarding the use of a live snake in their stage routine – referred to Van Horn and Borgia as "adagio dancers". In September 1950, Van Horn married a Marsha Wayne in Dallas, Texas; this marriage ended in divorce in Florida in 1956. It is unclear from available sources whether Carol Borgia was Marsha Wayne's stage name, or another woman entirely.

In 1952, Van Horn was elected as a trustee of the newly-formed Chicago Entertainers Union, a short-lived union of local striptease artistes.

== Final years and death ==
Van Horn suffered a setback after he was deprived of his gorilla suit, either through theft, or – according to some sources – when the suit was confiscated by a Florida landlady because Van Horn owed her unpaid rent. The loss of his costume threw Van Horn out of regular employment, and his final years were spent in poverty in New Orleans. He made occasional appearances as an unbilled extra in films such as A Hole in the Head (1959) and Hotel (1967). He died of cirrhosis, aged 59, in New Orleans' Charity Hospital in 1967. Although some authors have stated that he died on New Year's Day, vital records give his date of death as February 15, 1967.

== Selected filmography ==
- Never Give a Sucker an Even Break (1941)
- Keep 'Em Flying (1941)
- Jungle Girl (1941)
- Perils of Nyoka (1942)
- Ice-Capades Revue (1942)
- The Ape Man (1943)
- Sleepy Lagoon (1943)
- Are You With It? (1948)
