= Harry Burns (filmmaker) =

Film director, magazine editor (1882–1939)

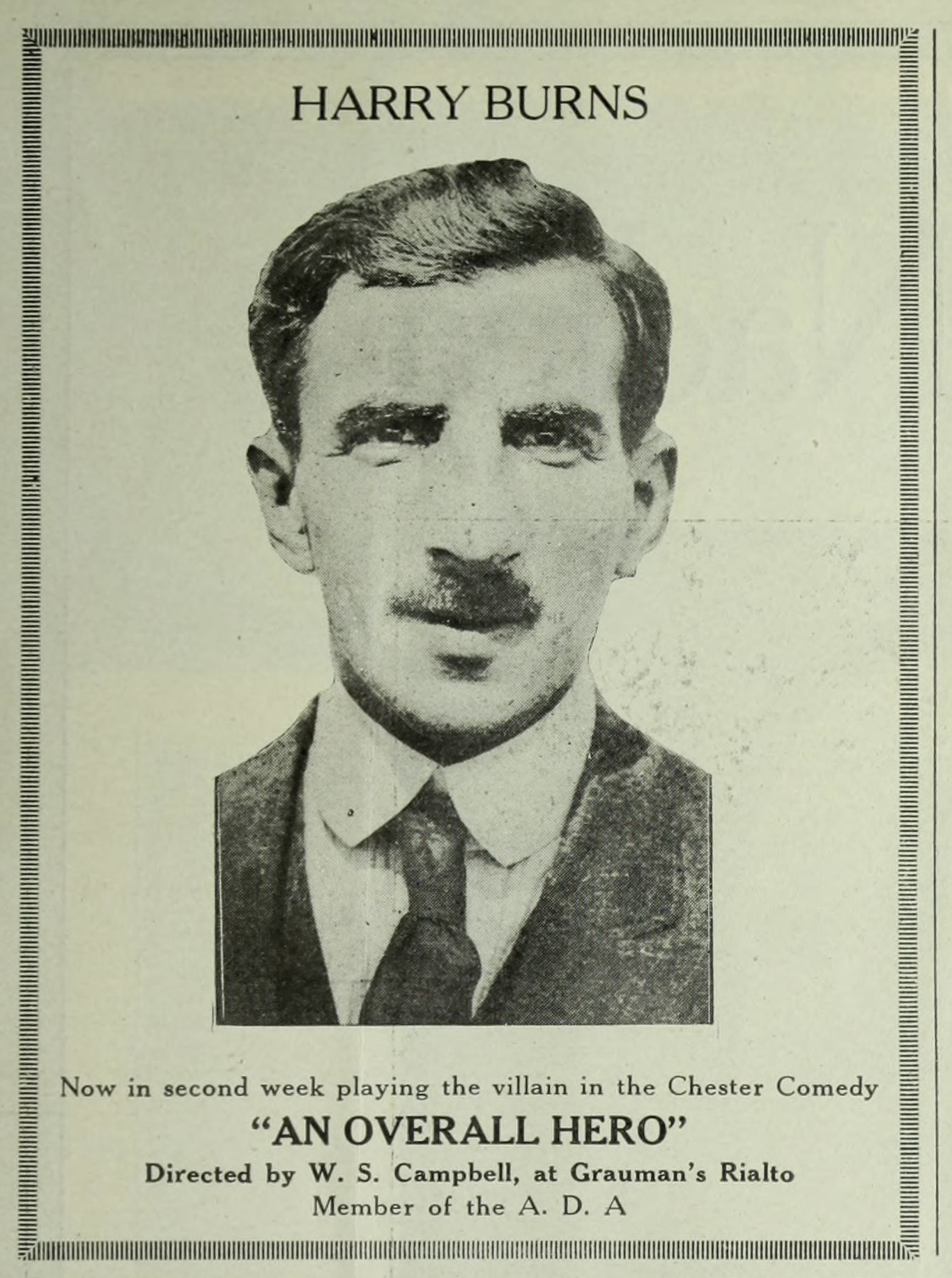
Harry Burns of Hollywood, California c. 1920

Harry Burns (born Jacob Elman; July 20, 1882 – January 9, 1939) was a vaudeville performer, boxing referee, actor, assistant director, animal-picture director and producer, and Hollywood magazine publisher. Burns was married to the actress Dorothy Vernon; the silent-film slapstick comedy star Bobby Vernon was his stepson.

== Biography ==
Burns was born Jacob Elman in Warsaw, Poland. He started in vaudeville in New York before 1900 when he captured the attention of audiences as "the world's champion bag puncher." He did nine years of vaudeville, traveling from California to Maine and back again. He was then employed at the Pacific Athletic Club as press agent and secretary to Thomas J. McCarey of the Vernon Arena but when 20-round boxing matches were banned in California, he went into the film industry. At the time of his death in 1939, Burns's life story was said to "encompass all the old Hollywoodiana that is gone forever. There's Uncle Tom McCarey's Vernon boxing arena, the 50-round fights that Burns refereed, the funny Jack-in-the-Beanstalk pictures he directed during the war, the rise of Carl Laemmle, the first Hollywood animal pictures..."

Burns worked as a prop master for Charlie Chase, and as a director for William Fox, Chet Franklin, and Hal Roach. He did a long stint as assistant director to William S. Campbell and when Campbell left Universal followed him to Chester Comedies, and then took over the Joe Martin monkey picture franchise for Universal, coproducing with Joe Martin's animal trainer Curley Stecker. He was a columnist for Camera! magazine and publisher and editor of Hollywood Filmograph. Burns frequently editorialized in his trade-paper columns against perceived exploitation of extras and bit players by the Central Casting Bureau. Filmograph under Burns's editorship also "spoke to the community of Hollywood actors...and supported Actors' Equity's attempt to gain a foothold" on the west coast.

During the filming of Rupert Hughes' 1923 Souls for Sale, Burns rescued one or more damsels from an accidental circus-tent fire. He was trampled by one or more panicked horses in the doing.

Burns married the performer Dorothy Vernon in 1915 and was stepfather to silent-film comedy star Bobby Vernon. Harry Burns died in Hollywood on January 9, 1939. Burns and Dorothy Vernon are buried together at Hollywood Forever Cemetery.

Described as the "kindest soul" (albeit with a "deceptively ferocious exterior"), at the time of his death Harry Burns was credited with having the "biggest heart west of Vine Street."

When he went to collect advertising fees, the advertiser more often than not touched him for lunch money. He loved to recall the good old days, for then he had been the world's champion bag-puncher, refereed some of Hollywood's biggest fights, and directed Joe Martin, the chimpanzee, in comedies. People liked him better that way; his compassion—in a town where the word is best understood with the first syllable silent—made them uncomfortable. But those whose lot he helped improve were, it may be, grateful.

— Philip K. Scheuer, Los Angeles Times

Note: This Harry Burns is distinct from character actor and native New Yorker Harry Burns (1887–1948), with whom he is frequently confused.
