= Billy the Kid in Santa Fe =

1941 film by Sam Newfield

- Theatrical poster
- Directed by: Sam Newfield
- Written by: Joseph O'Donnell (story and screenplay)
- Produced by: Sigmund Neufeld (producer)
- Starring: Bob Steele; Al St. John; Marin Sais
- Cinematography: Jack Greenhalgh
- Edited by: Holbrook N. Todd
- Music by: Johnny Lange; Lew Porter
- Production company: Sigmund Neufeld Productions
- Distributed by: Producers Releasing Corporation
- Release date: July 11, 1941
- Running time: 61 minutes
- Country: United States
- Language: English

Billy the Kid in Santa Fe is a 1941 American Western film directed by Sam Newfield. This film is the sixth in the "Billy the Kid" film series, produced by PRC from 1940 to 1946, and the last to star Bob Steele. In the next film, Billy the Kid Wanted, Steele was replaced by Buster Crabbe.

== Plot ==
Billy the Kid escapes from jail after being framed for murder. His friends Jeff and Fuzzy help him, knowing that he didn't commit the murder. The trio travels to Sant Fe, where they run into Joe Benson, who had been paid by gang leader Barton to lie at Billy's trial.

== Cast ==
- Bob Steele as Billy the Kid
- Al St. John as Fuzzy Q. Jones
- Rex Lease as Jeff
- Marin Sais as Pat Walker - Bar W Owner
- Dennis Moore as Silent Don Benson
- Karl Hackett as Bert Davis - Bar W Foreman
- Steve Clark as Allen
- Hal Price as Carlton City Sheriff
- Charles King as Steve Barton
- Frank Ellis as Hank Baxter (Gunman)
- Dave O'Brien as Texas Joe
- Kenne Duncan as Scotty - Henchman

== See also ==
The "Billy the Kid" films starring Bob Steele:

- Billy the Kid Outlawed (1940)
- Billy the Kid in Texas (1940)
- Billy the Kid's Gun Justice (1940)
- Billy the Kid's Range War (1941)
- Billy the Kid's Fighting Pals (1941)
- Billy the Kid in Santa Fe (1941)
