= William S. Campbell =

American film director (1884–1972)

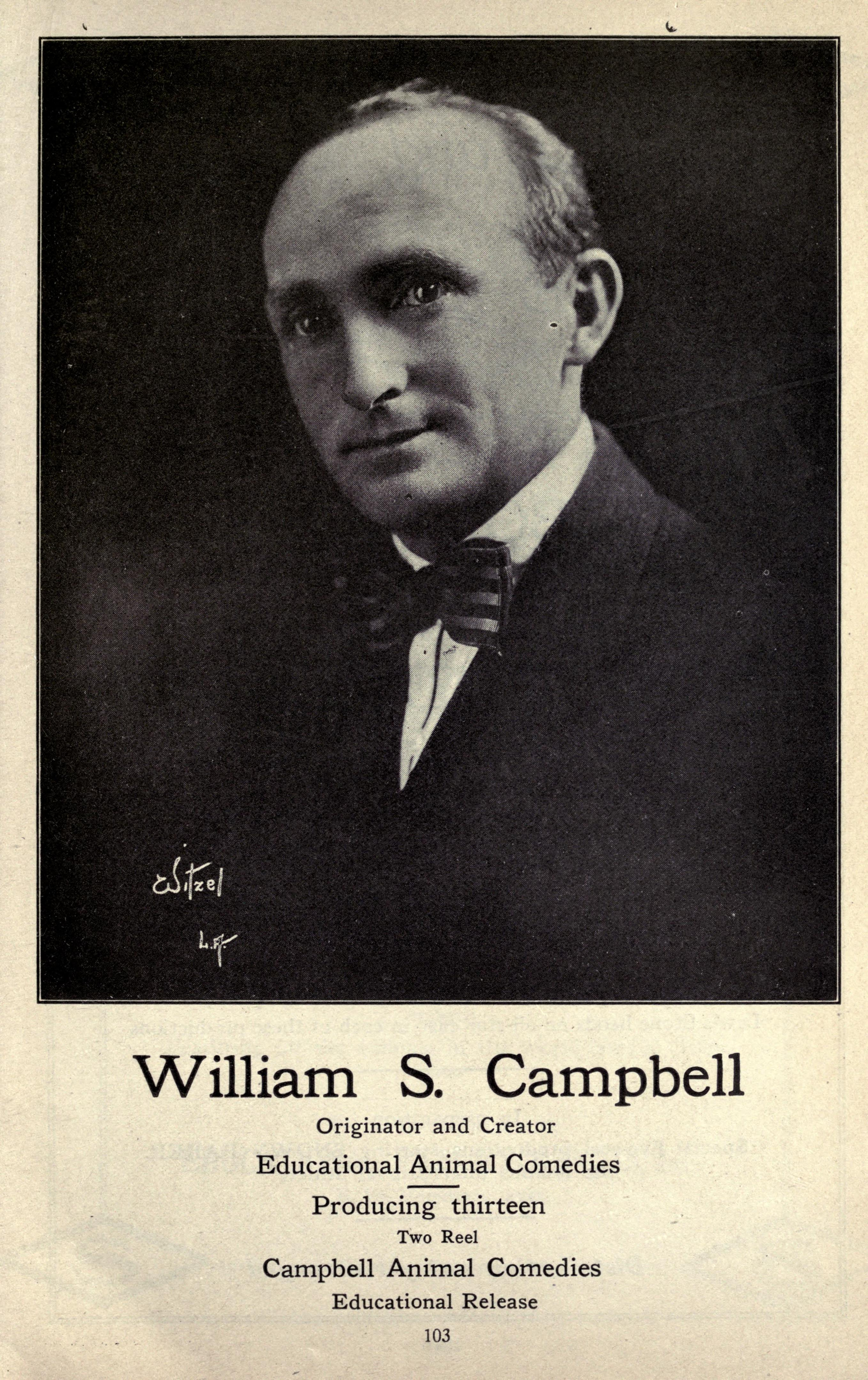
- Motion Picture Studio Directory, 1921
- Born: June 12, 1884; Pennsylvania
- Died: February 7, 1972 (aged 87); California
- Occupation: Filmmaker
- Years active: 1908–1931
- Known for: Animal comedies
- Notable work: Monkey Stuff, Jazz Monkey, Ingagi

William S. Campbell (June 12, 1884 – February 7, 1972) was a film director, scenarist and producer of Hollywood's silent and early talkies era, recognized for his skill in working with children and animals.

== Biography ==
Campbell, originally from Ashley, Pennsylvania, began his career working with animals when he ran away with a circus. His transition to the film business began when opened a movie theater, and then connected with Selig in 1908, for whom he wrote scenarios (today called screenplays). One memorable title for Selig was How the Cause Was Won, which was said to be "the first two-reel military drama ever produced." Campbell next worked for Keystone and Sunshine studios, and then was hired as a writer and director for Mack Sennett. His work for Sennett studios included directing the Sheriff Nell comedies. His animal picture work including "lions for Fox," and "monkey comedies" for Universal starring Joe Martin the orangutan. He directed a feature-length comedy for Universal starring Joe Martin and vaudeville performer Harry Burns called Loose Lions and Fast Husbands. It was inexplicably never released, at least under that title. Campbell also produced and directed the Snooky the Human-zee series of chimpanzee comedies for Chester Comedies. In 1922 it was reported that he had directed "nearly all the famous monkeys that have appeared in motion pictures the past six years." On more than one occasion, Campbell used live musicians to encourage his ape performers to evince on-screen emotion. While filming a Snooky film, a string sextet performing Mendelssohn's Spring Song yielded a suitable chimpanzee facial expression suggestive of pathos; this was said to "prove that animals can be affected by melody as well as human beings."

Campbell also directed an Our Gang knock-off for Educational Pictures called Assorted Heroes.

In spring 1924 it was announced that Campbell would direct an adaptation of Tarzan and the Golden Lion. J.P. McGowan is the credited director of the 1927 release. Campbell sued Edgar Rice Burroughs over the screen credits for Tarzan and the Golden Lion in 1929, claiming he had contracted with Burroughs to market the book and sold the scenario to Film Booking Office.

In 1926, his wife apparently filed for divorce, charging desertion and claiming that he spent more time with animals than with her.

Perhaps most infamously, Campbell directed the 1930 exploitation picture Ingagi about ritual virgin sacrifice to a 600 lb (270 kg) gorilla. The purported "documentary" element of Ingagi was promptly debunked and the American Society of Mammalogists "denounced" the picture. Ingagi was, if nothing else, a huge box office hit. In short order, RKO Pictures, Ingagi's distributor, released Bring 'Em Back Alive (1931), another "documentary" wherein Frank Buck appears to capture a wild mature male orangutan, and then in 1933, the landmark giant-primate picture, King Kong.

Campbell died in Los Angeles in 1972.
