= Beyond the Rockies (1932 film) =

1932 film

- Directed by: Fred Allen
- Screenplay by: Oliver Drake
- Story by: John P. McCarthy
- Produced by: David O. Selznick
- Starring: Tom Keene; Rochelle Hudson; Marie Wells; Julian Rivero; Ernie Adams
- Cinematography: Ted D. McCord
- Edited by: William Clemens
- Production company: RKO Pictures
- Distributed by: RKO Pictures
- Release date: July 8, 1932
- Running time: 54 minutes
- Country: United States
- Language: English

Beyond the Rockies is a 1932 American pre-Code Western film directed by Fred Allen and written by Oliver Drake. The film stars Tom Keene, Rochelle Hudson, Marie Wells, Julian Rivero and Ernie Adams. The film was released on July 8, 1932, by RKO Pictures.

== Plot ==
Noted gunman Black Jack and his friends arrive and take jobs on the Allen ranch. Allen's hands have quit and his cattle are being rustled. When one of Black Jack's friends is killed by the rustlers, he finds the killer and when they fight his Marshal's badge drops out and Ruby, the leader of the rustlers, picks it up. With his identity now known she sets a trap for him.

== Cast ==
- Tom Keene as Blackjack
- Rochelle Hudson as Betty Allen
- Marie Wells as Ruby Sherman
- Julian Rivero as Lavender Joe
- Ernie Adams as Blinky
- Hank Bell as Whiskey Bill
- William Welsh as John Allen
- Tom London as Kirk Tracy
- Ted Adams as Emory
