= Louise Currie =

American actress (1913–2013)

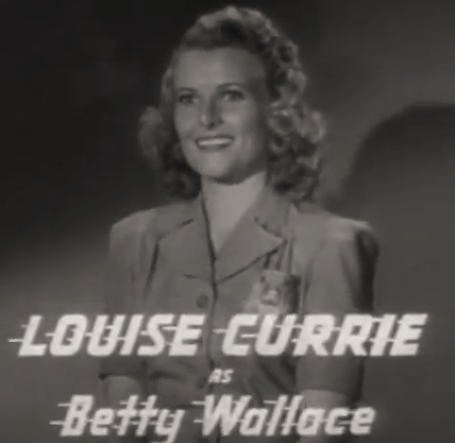
- Currie in Adventures of Captain Marvel, 1941
- Born: Louise Gunter; April 7, 1913; Oklahoma City, Oklahoma, U.S.
- Died: September 8, 2013 (aged 100); Santa Monica, California, U.S.
- Education: Sarah Lawrence College
- Occupation: Actress
- Years active: 1940–1956
- Spouses: Robert Hefner, Jr. (m. 1934; div. 1940): John Whitney (m. 1940; div. 19??); John Good (m. 1948; died 1996) Grover Asmus (m. 2002; died 2003)
- Children: 1

Louise Currie (born Louise Gunter; April 7, 1913 – September 8, 2013) was an American film actress, active from 1940 into the early 1950s.

== Biography ==
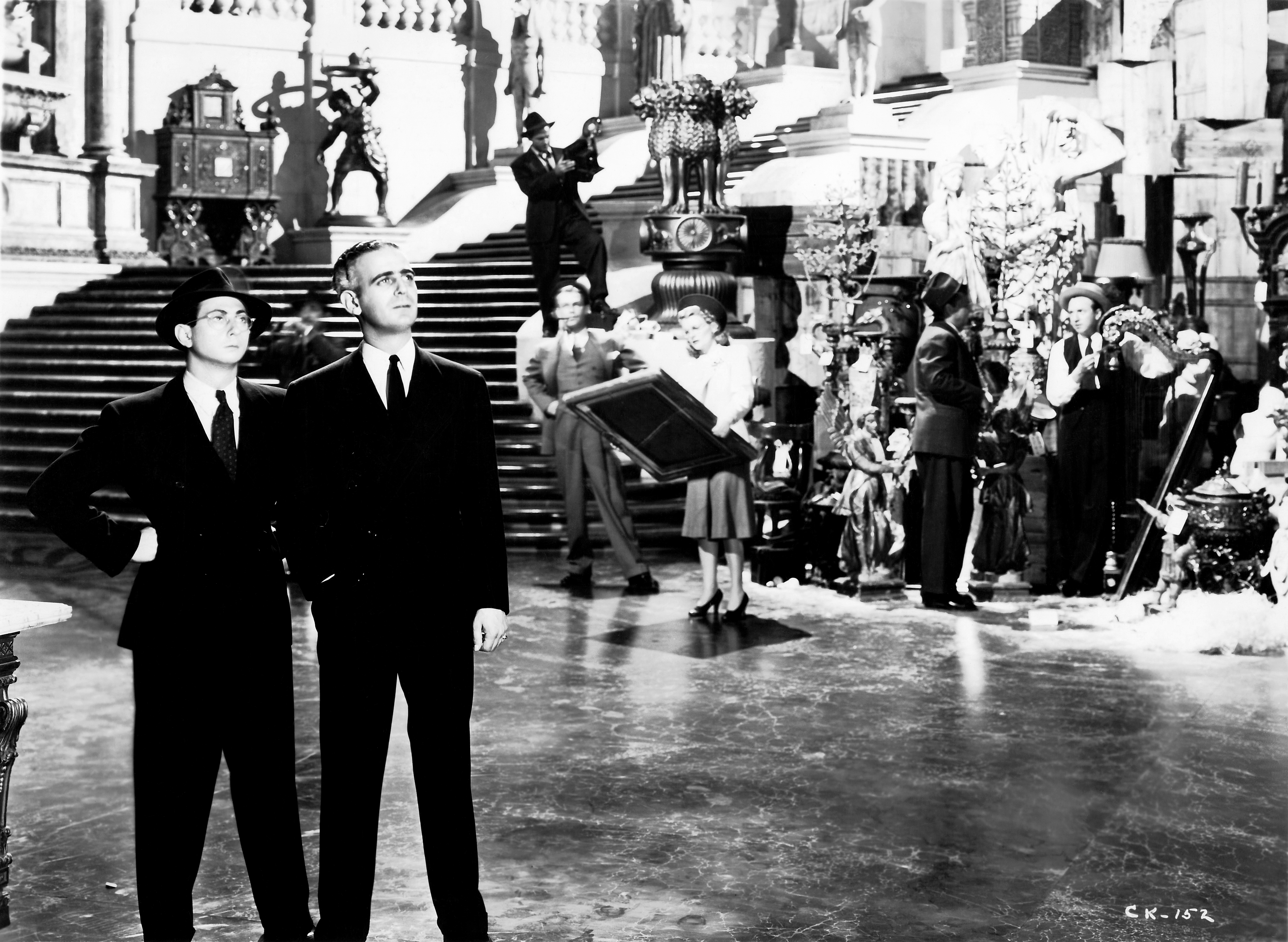
Louise Currie (center) beside Alan Ladd in a publicity photograph for Citizen Kane (1941), in which they both had uncredited roles as reporters

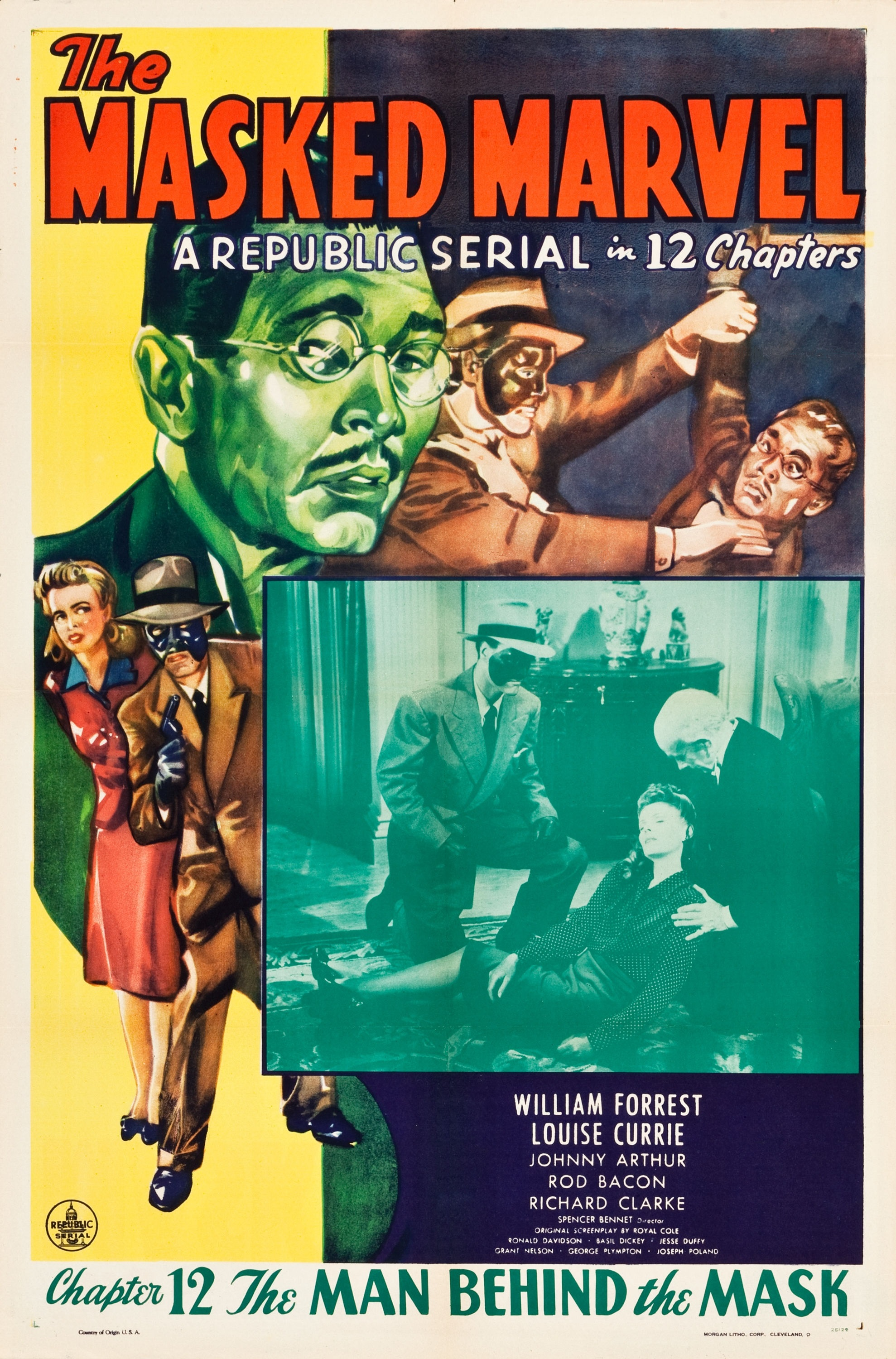
Poster for The Masked Marvel (1943)

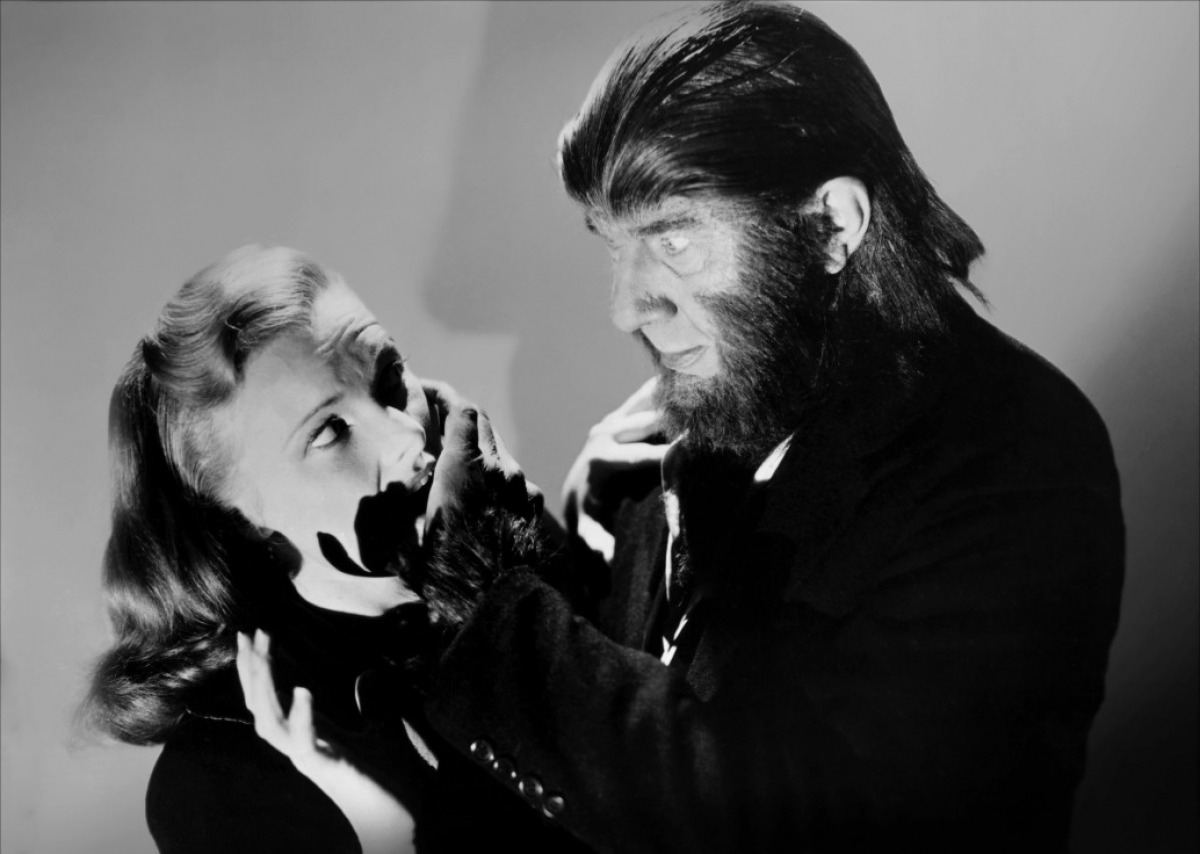
Louise Currie and Béla Lugosi in The Ape Man (1943)

Currie was born in Oklahoma City, Oklahoma, the daughter of Charles W. Gunter, a banker, and his wife, Louise (née Currie), whose maiden name she would take for her professional acting surname. She was prominent in society. While attending the Martha Washington Seminary, a finishing school for young women in Washington, D.C., she was chosen as one of the ten most beautiful society girls in the nation's capital. She attended Sarah Lawrence College in New York, where she became interested in acting. She moved to Hollywood, California and attended Max Reinhardt's drama school, where she was spotted by talent scouts while taking part in the school's stage workshop. She declined to attempt screen tests until after graduation.

With the help of her agent, Sue Carol, wife of actor Alan Ladd, she began working with Monogram Pictures and Columbia Pictures. Most of her movies were B-movies and serials, in which she often portrayed the heroine. Her film career began in 1940, when she appeared first in Billy the Kid Outlawed and then as a society debutante, in the Kay Kyser musical You'll Find Out. In 1941 she starred in the serial Adventures of Captain Marvel opposite Tom Tyler.

Currie had an uncredited role in Citizen Kane (1941), as a reporter at Xanadu, which included Alan Ladd as another reporter in the same sequence. She was the last surviving Kane cast member.

From 1940–49 she had roles in 39 films, many of which were starring, including The Masked Marvel (1943). She made a few television appearances in the 1950s, retiring permanently from acting in 1956.

== Personal life ==
Currie was first married to Robert A. Hefner Jr., but that marriage ended in divorce on January 29, 1940. She married actor John Whitney (1918-1985) at the peak of her career, but the marriage ended in divorce. On May 4, 1948, she married character actor John Good. He retired from acting, and the two opened a successful antique import-export business in Beverly Hills, remaining together until his death in December 1996. In 2002, Currie married Grover Asmus, the widower of actress Donna Reed. Asmus died in 2003.

== Other ==
In 1944, Currie starred opposite Hollywood legend Bela Lugosi in The Ape Man (1943) and Voodoo Man (1944). Along with actress Lucille Lund and others, she took part in the documentary film Lugosi: Hollywood's Dracula (1997), which detailed the life and acting career of Lugosi.

On May 17, 2010, Currie appeared at the Academy of Motion Picture Arts and Sciences in Beverly Hills to introduce a screening of a restored print of the first chapter of the 1941 serial, Adventures of Captain Marvel. She made repeat appearances on May 24, 2010 and August 16, 2010.

== Filmography ==
Year	Title	Role	Notes
1940	Billy the Kid Outlawed	Molly Fitzgerald	
1940	You'll Find Out	Marion	Uncredited
1940	The Green Hornet Strikes Again!	Bordine's Girlfriend	Serial, Uncredited
1940	Billy the Kid Outlawed	Molly Fitzgerald	
1940	Billy the Kid's Gun Justice	Ann Roberts	
1941	The Reluctant Dragon	Minor Role	Uncredited
1941	The Pinto Kid	Betty Ainsley	
1941	Adventures of Captain Marvel	Betty Wallace	Serial
1941	Citizen Kane	Reporter at Xanadu	Uncredited
1941	Hello, Sucker	Model	Uncredited
1941	Tillie the Toiler	Office Girl	Uncredited
1941	Double Trouble	Miss Mink	
1941	Look Who's Laughing	Jane, Marge's Friend	Uncredited
1941	Dude Cowboy	Gail Sargent	
1941	Bedtime Story	Hotel Telephone Operator	Uncredited
1942	Call Out the Marines	Girl Too Tired to Dance	Uncredited
1942	The Bashful Bachelor	Marjorie	
1942	Stardust on the Sage	Nancy Drew	
1943	The Ape Man	Billie Mason	
1943	The Masked Marvel	Alice Hamilton	Serial
1943	Around the World	WAAC	Uncredited
1944	Million Dollar Kid	Louise Cortland	
1944	Voodoo Man	Sally	
1944	Ali Baba and the Forty Thieves	Katherine Reynolds	
1944	Christmas Holiday	Stewardess	Uncredited
1944	Sensations of 1945	English Girl	Uncredited
1944	Practically Yours		Uncredited
1945	Love Letters	Clara Foley	Uncredited
1946	Gun Town	Buckskin Jane Sawyer	
1946	The Bachelor's Daughters	Salesgirl	Uncredited
1946	Her Sister's Secret	Dick's Blonde Girlfriend	Uncredited
1946	Wild West	Florabelle Bannister	
1947	Backlash	Marian Gordon	
1947	Three on a Ticket	Helen Brimstead	
1947	The Crimson Key	Heidi	
1947	Second Chance	Joan Summers	
1947	The Chinese Ring	Peggy Cartwright	
1949	And Baby Makes Three	Miss Quigley - Secretary	Uncredited
1951	Queen for a Day	Secretary	
