= Billy the Kid's Gun Justice =

1940 film by Sam Newfield

- 1940 lobby card
- Directed by: Sam Newfield
- Written by: Joseph O'Donnell
- Screenplay by: Tom Gibson
- Produced by: Sigmund Neufeld (producer)
- Starring: Bob Steele; Al St. John; Louise Currie; Carleton Young
- Cinematography: Jack Greenhalgh
- Edited by: Holbrook N. Todd
- Music by: Johnny Lange; Lew Porter
- Distributed by: Producers Releasing Corporation
- Release date: December 27, 1940
- Running time: 57 minutes
- Country: United States
- Language: English

Billy the Kid's Gun Justice is a 1940 American Western film directed by Sam Newfield for Producers Releasing Corporation, and 3rd in PRC's Billy the Kid series.

== Plot ==
Billy the Kid (Bob Steele) and his friends Jeff (Carleton Young) and Fuzzy (Al St. John) are ambushed in a cabin. When Jeff is wounded during their getaway, they decide to hide out at Jeff's uncle's ranch in Little Bend Valley. While traveling to the ranch, they see henchmen Ed (Charles King) and Buck (Rex Lease) accosting Ann Roberts (Louise Currie) and throwing her goods from her wagon. After Billy chases them off, Ann tells him that she and her father Tom (Forrest Taylor) had recently purchased a ranch and that someone is trying to run them off their land. Traveling with Ann to protect her, they learn that the ranch she and her father had purchased was the one owned by Jeff's uncle, but that they failed to purchase the water rights. Discovering that other ranchers in the area had also purchased lands without water rights, Billy also learns that land baron Cobb Allen (Al Ferguson) had maliciously dammed the only free water stream in the area in order to force the group of ranchers to purchase water rights, or default on their loans. Billy and Jeff fight Allen's henchmen at the barricade, and after subduing them they return the water flow to its original channel.

== Cast ==
- Bob Steele as Billy the Kid
- Al St. John as Fuzzy Jones
- Louise Currie as Ann Roberts
- Carleton Young as Jeff Blanchard
- Charles King as Henchman Ed Baker
- Rex Lease as Henchman Buck
- Kenne Duncan as Henchman Bragg
- Forrest Taylor as Tom Roberts
- Ted Adams as 2nd Sheriff
- Al Ferguson as Cobb Allen
- Karl Hackett as Attorney Martin
- Edward Peil Sr. as Dave Barlow
- Julian Rivero as Carlos
- Blanca Vischer as Juanita

== See also ==
The "Billy the Kid" films starring Bob Steele:

- Billy the Kid Outlawed (1940)
- Billy the Kid in Texas (1940)
- Billy the Kid's Gun Justice (1940)
- Billy the Kid's Range War (1941)
- Billy the Kid's Fighting Pals (1941)
- Billy the Kid in Santa Fe (1941)
