= Billy the Kid in Texas =

1940 film by Sam Newfield

- Theatrical poster
- Directed by: Sam Newfield (as Peter Stewart)
- Written by: Joseph O'Donnell (original screenplay)
- Produced by: Sigmund Neufeld (producer)
- Starring: Bob Steele
- Cinematography: Jack Greenhalgh
- Edited by: Holbrook N. Todd
- Distributed by: Producers Releasing Corporation
- Release date: September 30, 1940
- Running time: 52 minutes
- Country: United States
- Language: English

Billy the Kid in Texas is a 1940 American Western film directed by Sam Newfield. It's the second in the "Billy the Kid" film series, produced by PRC from 1940 to 1946.

== Plot ==
Billy the Kid runs into his old friend Fuzzy in a wide-open Texas town. When he stands up to town thug Flash and his gang, the grateful citizens make him sheriff. Now that he has legal authority, Billy and Fuzzy go after Flash, who has stolen a large amount of money and framed young Gil Cooper, a member of his gang, for it—not knowing that Gil Cooper is Gil Bonney, Billy's brother.

== Cast ==
- Bob Steele as Billy the Kid
- Al St. John as Fuzzy
- Terry Walker as Mary Barton
- Carleton Young as Gil Bonney / Gil Cooper
- Charles King as Dave
- John Merton as Flash
- Frank LaRue as Jim Morgan
- Slim Whitaker as Windy the Wagon Driver

== See also ==
The "Billy the Kid" films starring Bob Steele:

- Billy the Kid Outlawed (1940)
- Billy the Kid in Texas (1940)
- Billy the Kid's Gun Justice (1940)
- Billy the Kid's Range War (1941)
- Billy the Kid's Fighting Pals (1941)
- Billy the Kid in Santa Fe (1941)
