= Outlaw Express =

Film directed by George Waggner

- Theatrical release poster
- Directed by: George Waggner
- Screenplay by: Norton S. Parker
- Story by: Norton S. Parker
- Produced by: Trem Carr
- Starring: Bob Baker; Cecilia Callejo; Don Barclay; LeRoy Mason; Nina Campana; Martin Garralaga
- Cinematography: Harry Neumann
- Edited by: Charles Craft
- Music by: Frank Sanucci
- Production company: Universal Pictures
- Distributed by: Universal Pictures
- Release date: June 17, 1938
- Running time: 56 minutes
- Country: United States
- Language: English

Outlaw Express is a 1938 American Western film directed by George Waggner and written by Norton S. Parker. The film stars Bob Baker, Cecilia Callejo, Don Barclay, LeRoy Mason, Nina Campana and Martin Garralaga. The film was released on June 17, 1938, by Universal Pictures.

== Plot ==
Bob Bradley and Andy Sharpe are army officers assigned to go undercover to investigate the mysterious murders of Pony Express riders. They uncover a plot to steal land from the former Mexican residents of California as they re-register their properties with the new American authorities in Washington.

== Cast ==
- Bob Baker as Bob Bradley
- Cecilia Callejo as Lorita Hernandez
- Don Barclay as Andy Sharpe
- LeRoy Mason as Jack Sommers
- Nina Campana as Lupe
- Martin Garralaga as Don Ricardo Hernandez
- Forrest Taylor as John F. Ferguson
- Carlyle Moore Jr. as Bill Cody
- Julian Rivero as Don Francisco Diego
- Jack Kirk as Phelps
- Carleton Young as Ramon
- Apache as Bob's Horse
