= Three on a Ticket =

1947 film by Sam Newfield

- Theatrical release poster
- Directed by: Sam Newfield
- Screenplay by: Fred Myton
- Based on: The Corpse Came Calling by Brett Halliday
- Produced by: Sigmund Neufeld
- Starring: Hugh Beaumont; Cheryl Walker; Paul Bryar; Ralph Dunn; Louise Currie; Gavin Gordon; Charles Quigley; Douglas Fowley
- Cinematography: Jack Greenhalgh
- Edited by: Holbrook N. Todd
- Music by: Emil Cadkin
- Production company: Sigmund Neufeld Productions
- Distributed by: Producers Releasing Corporation
- Release date: April 4, 1947
- Running time: 64 minutes
- Country: United States
- Language: English

Three on a Ticket is a 1947 American crime film directed by Sam Newfield and written by Fred Myton. It is based on the 1942 novel The Corpse Came Calling by Brett Halliday. The film stars Hugh Beaumont, Cheryl Walker, Paul Bryar, Ralph Dunn, Louise Currie, Gavin Gordon, Charles Quigley and Douglas Fowley. The film was released on April 4, 1947, by Producers Releasing Corporation.

== Plot ==
A man stumbles into the office of private detective Michael Shayne and dies before Shayne can question him. The only clue is part of a ticket stub in the man's hand, which turns out to be sought by a variety of crooks and government men. Then a mysterious blonde femme fatale shows up, who knew the dead man, asking for Mike's help. Based on the novel "The Corpse Came Calling" by Brett Halliday.

== Cast ==
- Hugh Beaumont as Michael Shayne
- Cheryl Walker as Phyllis Hamilton
- Paul Bryar as Tim Rourke
- Ralph Dunn as Inspector Pete Rafferty
- Louise Currie as Helen Brimstead
- Gavin Gordon as Pearson aka Barton
- Charles Quigley as Kurt Leroy
- Douglas Fowley as Mace Morgan
- Noel Cravat as Trigger
- Charles King as Drunk
- Brooks Benedict as Jim Lacy
