= Billy the Kid's Fighting Pals =

1941 film by Sam Newfield

- 1941 lobby card
- Directed by: Sam Newfield
- Screenplay by: George H. Plympton
- Story by: George H. Plympton
- Produced by: Sigmund Neufeld
- Starring: Bob Steele; Al St. John; Phyllis Adair; Carleton Young
- Cinematography: Jack Greenhalgh
- Edited by: Holbrook N. Todd
- Production company: Sigmund Neufeld Productions
- Distributed by: Producers Releasing Corporation
- Release date: April 18, 1941 (U.S.)
- Running time: 59 minutes
- Country: United States
- Language: English

Billy the Kid's Fighting Pals (also known as Trigger Men) is a 1941 American Western directed by Sam Newfield for Producers Releasing Corporation (PRC), and the fifth in PRC's Billy the Kid film series.

== Plot ==
Billy the Kid (Bob Steele) and his friends Jeff (Carleton Young) and Fuzzy (Al St. John) are on the run. They make it to Paradise Town, where the trio witnesses the murder of Marshal Mason (Stanley Price). Fuzzy poses as the marshal and rides into the town, which is now ruled by a gang led by Burke (Curley Dresden) under orders from a prominent businessman in Paradise. Setting out to put an end to the gang's lawless rule over the town, the trio faces another problem—the ward of the town banker Hardy (Edward Peil, Sr.), Ann (Phyllis Adair), who is out to set obstacles for them for unknown reasons. Along the journey, they befriend Mexican secret agent Lopez (Julian Rivero), who is posing as a bartender. As the plot thickens, it is revealed that the true mastermind is Hardy, who plans on buying up all the local property to dig a smuggling tunnel to Mexico.

== Cast ==
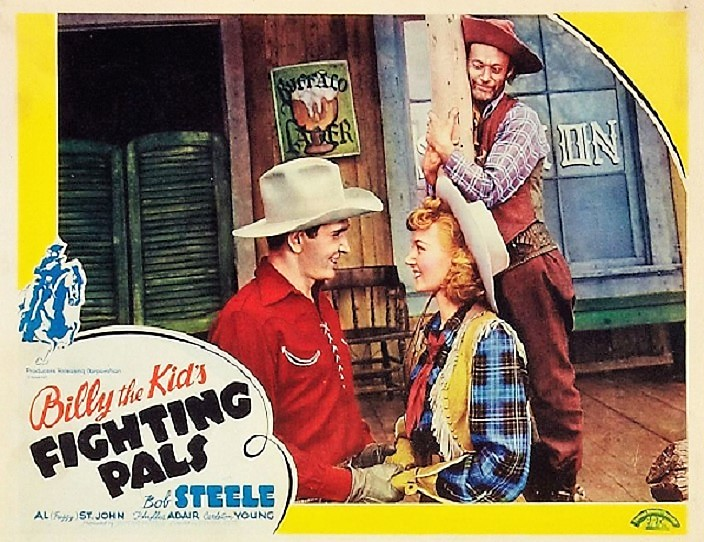
Lobby card

- Bob Steele as Billy the Kid
- Carleton Young as Jeff
- Al St. John as Fuzzy
- Edward Peil, Sr. as Hardy
- Phyllis Adair as Ann
- Stanley Price as Marshall Mason
- Julian Rivero as Lopez
- Curley Dresden as Burke
- Budd Buster as Editor Mason

== Release ==
Billy the Kid's Fighting Pals was commercially released on 18 April 1941 in the U.S. through Producers Releasing Corporation.

== See also ==
The "Billy the Kid" films starring Bob Steele:

- Billy the Kid Outlawed (1940)
- Billy the Kid in Texas (1940)
- Billy the Kid's Gun Justice (1940)
- Billy the Kid's Range War (1941)
- Billy the Kid's Fighting Pals (1941)
- Billy the Kid in Santa Fe (1941)
