= Billy the Kid Outlawed =

1940 film

- Directed by: Sam Newfield (as Peter Stewart)
- Screenplay by: Oliver Drake
- Produced by: Sigmund Neufeld
- Starring: Bob Steele; Al St. John; Carleton Young; Louise Currie; John Merton
- Cinematography: Jack Greenhalgh
- Edited by: Holbrook N. Todd
- Production company: Sigmund Neufeld Productions
- Distributed by: Producers Releasing Corporation
- Release date: July 20, 1940
- Running time: 52 minutes
- Country: United States
- Language: English

Billy the Kid Outlawed is a 1940 American Western film directed by Sam Newfield and written by Oliver Drake. It stars Bob Steele as gunfighter "Billy the Kid", Al St. John as his sidekick "Fuzzy" Jones and Carleton Young as Jeff Travis, with Louise Currie and John Merton. The film was released on July 20, 1940, by Producers Releasing Corporation.

It is the first film in the 1940-1946 "Billy the Kid" film series, which spanned 42 movies—six starring Bob Steele, and the rest starring Buster Crabbe. Steele was replaced in 1941 with Billy the Kid Wanted.

The series also starred Al St. John as the Lone Rider's sidekick, "Fuzzy" Jones, who appeared in all 42 films. At the same time that he was appearing in the "Billy the Kid" films, St. John was also playing the same character as the Lone Rider's sidekick in PRC's "Lone Rider" series, which ran from 1941-1943. Carleton Young also played Billy's friend Jeff Travis in the first five movies.

== Plot ==
In Lincoln County, New Mexico, villainous general store owner Sam Daly is running for sheriff, with the support of his partner, Pete Morgan. They're opposed by local ranchers Bob and Hal Bennett, and Morgan has the Bennetts killed.

Billy Bonney is on a cattle drive with his friends "Fuzzy" Jones and Jeff Travis; when they get to Lincoln County, they're horrified to learn that their friends the Bennetts have been killed. They learn from hired hand Shorty Rice that Morgan's gang is responsible, and head into town to find the murderers. Sheriff Long is no help, but Billy and his friends save Judge Fitzgerald and his daughter Molly from being kidnapped by the gang.

Judge Fitzgerald has been appointed by the Department of Justice to investigate the situation in Lincoln County, but he's gunned down by Morgan's men, and Sheriff Long deputizes Billy, Fuzzy and Jeff to catch the murderers. While they're tracking the killers down, Sam Daly is elected the new sheriff, and he puts a warrant out for the three friends.

Now branded an outlaw, Billy calls himself "Billy the Kid", begins holding up trains carrying goods to Morgan's store. The price on Billy's head goes up, and Morgan and Daly decide to set a trap for him. They offer a pardon from the Governor if he'll turn himself in, but plan to murder him as soon as he steps into town. They get Molly Fitzgerald and her boyfriend Dave Hendricks to persuade Billy to give up, but Billy suspects a trap and captures Morgan and Daly himself.

Billy sends Morgan and Daly ahead to the ambush spot, and they're accidentally killed by their gang. Billy and his friends round up the murderers and bring them to justice. Molly and Dave want to help Billy to clear his name, but by now Billy has no trust in the law, and he and his friends ride off—innocents branded as outlaws.

== Cast ==
- Bob Steele as Billy the Kid
- Al St. John as "Fuzzy" Jones
- Carleton Young as Jeff Travis
- Louise Currie as Molly Fitzgerald
- John Merton as Lije Ellis
- Joe McGuinn as Pete Morgan
- Ted Adams as Sam Daly
- Walter McGrail as John Fitzgerald
- Hal Price as Sheriff Long
- Kenne Duncan as David Hendricks
- Reed Howes as Whitey
- George Chesebro as Tex
- Budd Buster as Clem
- Steve Clark as Shorty Rice

== See also ==
The "Billy the Kid" films starring Bob Steele:

- Billy the Kid Outlawed (1940)
- Billy the Kid in Texas (1940)
- Billy the Kid's Gun Justice (1940)
- Billy the Kid's Range War (1941)
- Billy the Kid's Fighting Pals (1941)
- Billy the Kid in Santa Fe (1941)
