= Billy the Kid's Range War =

1941 film by Sam Newfield

- Film poster
- Directed by: Sam Newfield
- Written by: William Lively
- Produced by: Sigmund Neufeld
- Starring: Bob Steele; Carleton Young; Joan Barclay
- Cinematography: Jack Greenhalgh
- Edited by: Holbrook N. Todd
- Music by: David Chudnow; Lew Porter
- Production company: Sigmund Neufeld Productions
- Distributed by: Producers Releasing Corporation
- Release date: January 24, 1941
- Running time: 57 minutes
- Country: United States
- Language: English

Billy the Kid's Range War is a 1941 American Western film directed by Sam Newfield that was the fourth of Producers Releasing Corporation's Billy the Kid film series. Despite the film's title and mention of Lincoln County, there is neither a range war nor a range seen in the film.

This film is the fourth in the "Billy the Kid" film series, produced by PRC from 1940 to 1946.

== Plot ==
Once again, Billy the Kid is pursued by the law for crimes he hasn't committed. With the help of a sympathetic marshal and Mexican range detective, Billy and his cantankerous slingshot-wielding sidekick, Fuzzy, get the chance to clear Billy's name by helping Ellen Gorman, the owner of a stagecoach line menaced by villains backed by a corrupt sheriff.

== Cast ==
- Bob Steele as Billy the Kid
- Al St. John as Fuzzy Q. Jones
- Carleton Young as Marshal Jeff Carson
- Joan Barclay as Ellen Gorman
- Milton Kibbee as Leonard - Ellen's Guardian
- Rex Lease as Buck
- Karl Hackett as Williams
- Ted Adams as Sheriff Black
- Julian Rivero as Miguel Romero
- Stephen Chase as Lawyer Dave Hendrix
- Howard Masters as Ab Jenkins
- Buddy Roosevelt as Henchman Spike

== See also ==
The "Billy the Kid" films starring Bob Steele:

- Billy the Kid Outlawed (1940)
- Billy the Kid in Texas (1940)
- Billy the Kid's Gun Justice (1940)
- Billy the Kid's Range War (1941)
- Billy the Kid's Fighting Pals (1941)
- Billy the Kid in Santa Fe (1941)
