= Bitter Creek (film) =

1954 film by Thomas Carr

- Directed by: Thomas Carr
- Written by: George Waggner
- Produced by: Vincent M. Fennelly
- Starring: Bill Elliott; Carleton Young; Beverly Garland
- Cinematography: Ernest Miller
- Edited by: Sam Fields
- Music by: Raoul Kraushaar
- Production company: Allied Artists
- Distributed by: Allied Artists
- Release date: February 21, 1954
- Running time: 74 minutes
- Country: United States
- Language: English

Bitter Creek is a 1954 American Western film directed by Thomas Carr and starring Wild Bill Elliott, Carleton Young, and Beverly Garland. The screenplay concerns a man who sets out to personally avenge the murder of his rancher brother.

== Plot ==
Gail Bonner is alone in her hotel room when Clay Tyndall bursts in, pursued by gunmen. He protects her, kills one pursuer, and escapes. Her brother, Jerry, arrives to check on her, and they embrace in relief.

Traveling deeper into Montana, Gail and Jerry meet Dr. Prentiss, to whom Gail reveals her engagement to Quentin Allen. Their carriage driver, A.Z. Platte, picks up Clay, who is seeking justice for his brother, Frank, recently killed in a land dispute with Quentin. Both Prentiss and A.Z., former friends of Frank, warn Clay about Quentin, leader of the Lazy Q Ranch.

When the carriage arrives in town, Quentin sends out his men to collect Gail and Jerry, but the men realize that Clay Tyndall is with them. A tense stand-off ensues, but Gail pleads with Quentin to stop the fight, which he does for her.

At Frank's ranch, the Circle T, Clay confronts squatters, investigates his brother's death, and survives multiple attacks from Quentin's gang. Meanwhile, Gail tries to dissuade Clay from seeking revenge, and their romantic tension grows. Quentin, noticing this, hires an assassin, but A.Z. warns Clay and is killed in the process. Quentin's main henchmen, Vance Morgan, kills the assassin before he can be interrogated. Furious, Clay confronts Quentin, who calls in his gang; he is only saved by Jerry's unintentional intervention.

After Quentin orders a brutal attack on a cook who offered to help Clay, Clay retaliates by fighting Oak Mason, one of Quentin's men, who admits Quentin had Frank killed. Before Oak can reveal more, another gang member silences him, forcing Clay to defend himself and kill him.

Quentin admits to Vance that Gail has left him, and they wait for Clay's arrival. Although Clay tries to seek legal action, the sheriff refuses to help. As he leaves the sheriff's office, Quentin's men chase him. In an extraordinary shot, Quentin shoots Clay in the shoulder. Just like when they first met, Gail shelters Clay in her hotel, and when Vance Morgan searches for him, Clay ambushes and kills him.

Returning to Circle T, Clay finds Dr. Prentiss drunk and unconscious. Quentin appears and about to kill Clay, but Prentiss throws a bottle at him, giving Clay the chance to shoot him dead. In the end, Clay and Gail reunite, planning on staying at the ranch together.

== Cast ==
- Wild Bill Elliott as Clay Tyndall
- Carleton Young as Quentin Allen
- Beverly Garland as Gail Bonner
- Claude Akins as Vance Morgan – Henchman
- Jim Hayward as Dr. Prentiss
- John Harmon as A.Z. Platte – Stagecoach Driver
- Veda Ann Borg as Whitey
- Danny Mummert as Jerry Bonner
- John Pickard as Oak Mason – Henchman
- Forrest Taylor as Harley Pruett
- Dabbs Greer as Sheriff
- Mike Ragan as Joe Venango – Henchman
- Zon Murray as Henchman
- John Larch as Hired Gunman
- Joe Devlin as Pat - Bartender
- Earle Hodgins as Charles Hammond
- Florence Lake as Mrs. Hammond
- Jane Easton as Oak's Girlfriend
