= Carleton Young =

American character actor (1905–1994)

Carleton Scott Young
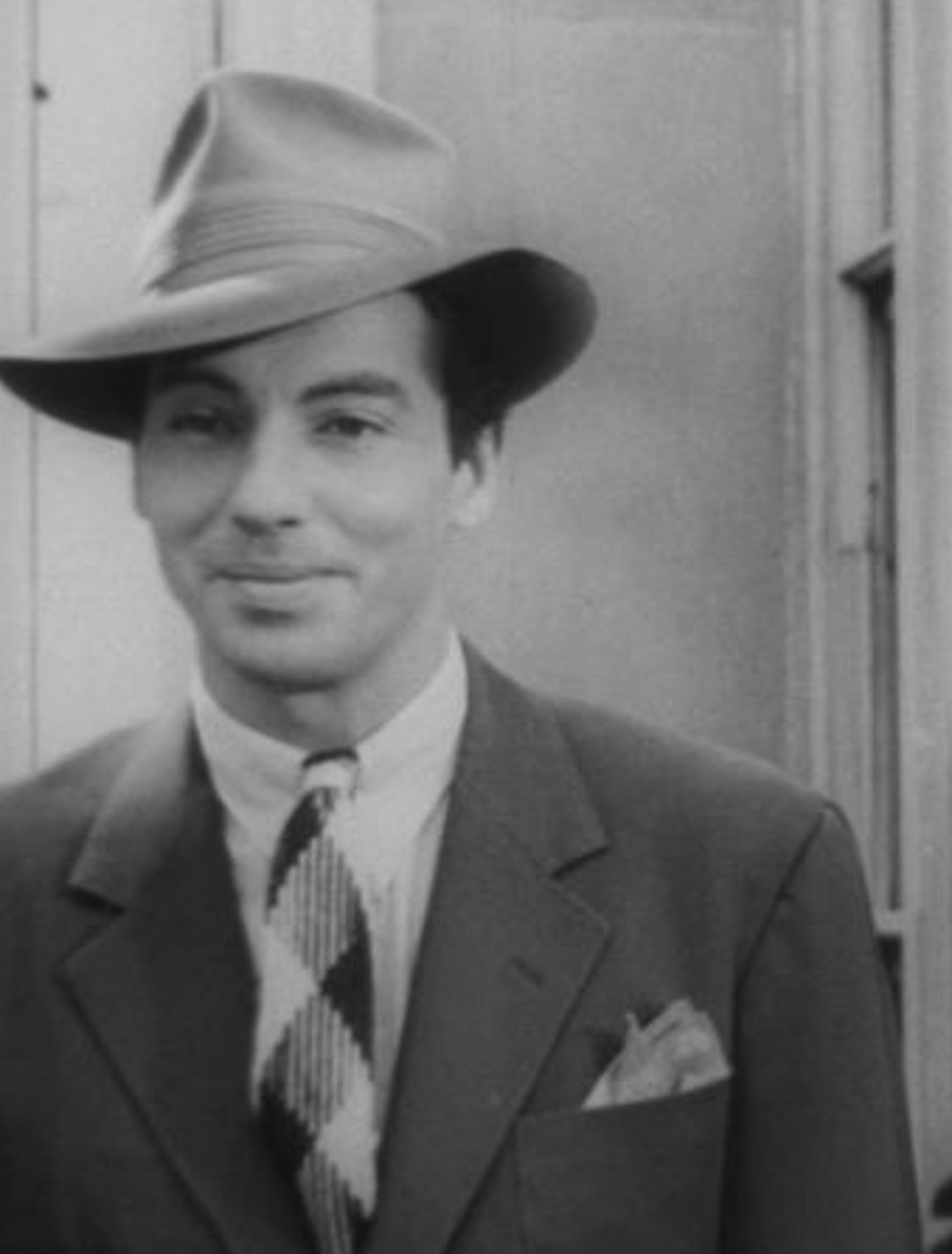
- Young in Reefer Madness (1936)
- Born: Carleton Scott Young; October 21, 1905; Fulton, New York, U.S.
- Died: November 7, 1994 (aged 89); Burbank, California, U.S.
- Other names: Gordon Roberts, Carlton S. Young
- Occupation: Actor
- Years active: 1932–1973
- Spouse: Noel Toy (m. 1945)

Captain Carleton Scott Young (October 21, 1905 – November 7, 1994) was an American character actor who was known for his deep voice.

== Early years ==
Young was born in Fulton, Oswego County, New York, the second and only surviving child of civil engineer Joseph Henry Young and Minna Emma Pauline "Minnie" Adler. His parents were married in 1897 but divorced by 1920. Young's brother Reginald lived for 26 days in 1902 but died of an acute infection and convulsions.

Young was raised in Syracuse, New York, but was living in Ogden, Utah, with his divorced father by 1930.

== Military service ==
Young enlisted in the U.S. Army when he was age 35 as a private in the air corps. He left the service with the rank of captain.

== Career ==
Young starred in 1934 Broadway production of Henry Rosendahl's Yesterday's Orchids. He appeared in 235 American television and film roles, debuting with The Fighting Marines (1935). He ended his career in the 1973 television series The Magician, which starred Bill Bixby. He was a member of the John Ford Stock Company.

=== Film ===
Young played Billy the Kid's sidekick Jeff Travis in the first five films of the Billy the Kid film series from 1940 to 1941.

Young also appeared in Reefer Madness (1936), Navy Blues (1937), Dick Tracy (1937), Valley of the Sun (1942), Flying Leathernecks (1951), The Day the Earth Stood Still (1951), From Here to Eternity (1953), 20,000 Leagues Under the Sea (1954), The Horse Soldiers (1959) and North by Northwest (1959).

Portraying a newspaper editor in The Man Who Shot Liberty Valance (1962), he spoke one of the most famous lines in Western film history: "No sir, this is the West: When the legend becomes fact, print the legend."

=== Radio ===
Young's radio career included a brief star turn as the title role in the short-lived crime drama The Whisperer (1951), loosely derived from the longtime crime hit The Whistler. Young played attorney Philip Gault, whose voice was destroyed in an accident and who developed a sardonic whisper to compensate until his voice was restored.

Young's other roles in radio programs included:

Program	Role
The Count of Monte Cristo	Edmond Dantes
The Adventures of Ellery Queen	Ellery Queen
Front Page Farrell	David Farrell
Hollywood Mystery Time	Jim Laughton
Life Begins	Winfield Craig
Second Husband	Bill Cummings
Stella Dallas	Dick Grosvenor

=== Television ===
Other television programs in which Young was cast include: Schlitz Playhouse of Stars (1951), Boston Blackie (1953), ABC Album (1953), Racket Squad (1953), The Whistler (1954), The Adventures of Wild Bill Hickok (1955), Highway Patrol (1955), Leave It to Beaver" (1959), The Donna Reed Show (1959) and Wagon Train (1960).

=== Other activities ===
Young formed the Los Angeles Smog Corp. to manufacture cans of "genuine Los Angeles smog", which were sold as novelty items.

== Personal life ==
Young married Helen Virginia Haberbosch in 1931; the couple was divorced in 1935. He remarried, but was divorced again before marrying Ngum Yee "Emma" Hom (known as Noel Toy) in 1945, to whom he was married at the time of his death.

== Selected filmography ==
- The Fighting Marines (1935, Serial) – Doctor [Ch. 4] (uncredited)
- Black Gold (1936) – Oilfield Roughneck (uncredited)
- Happy Go Lucky (1936) – Al
- The Mandarin Mystery (1936) – Drunk (uncredited)
- A Man Betrayed (1936) – Henchman Smokey
- Reefer Madness (1936) – Jack
- Larceny on the Air (1937) – Radio Announcer (uncredited)
- Join the Marines (1937) – Corporal
- Dick Tracy (1937, Serial) – Gordon Tracy, After
- Round-Up Time in Texas (1937) – Strike Messenger (uncredited)
- Circus Girl (1937) – Aerialist (uncredited)
- Git Along Little Dogies (1937) – First Holdup Man
- Navy Blues (1937) – Spencer
- The Hit Parade (1937) – Radio Announcer (uncredited)
- Michael O'Halloran (1937) – (uncredited)
- Come On, Cowboys (1937) – Federal Prosecutor (uncredited)
- Dangerous Holiday (1937) – Tango
- It Could Happen to You (1937) – Thug (uncredited)
- Atlantic Flight (1937) – Air Show Announcer (uncredited)
- S.O.S. Coast Guard (1937) – Henchman Dodds [Ch. 4]
- Stars Over Arizona (1937) – Henchman Curley (uncredited)
- A Bride for Henry (1937) – Hotel Guest (uncredited)
- She Married an Artist (1937) – Reporter (uncredited)
- Young Dynamite (1937) – Spike Dolan
- Race Suicide (1938) – Parker
- The Spy Ring (1938) – Polo Game Timekeeper (uncredited)
- The Old Barn Dance (1938) – Peabody
- Cassidy of Bar 20 (1938) – Jeff Caffrey
- Rawhide (1938) – Reporter (uncredited)
- Air Devils (1938) – Hotel Clerk (uncredited)
- Gangs of New York (1938) – Nolan's Henchman (uncredited)
- Gunsmoke Trail (1938) – Trampy Gambler at Roulette Table (uncredited)
- The Fighting Devil Dogs (1938, Serial) – Johnson, 'Aurora' Crewman [Ch. 4]
- The Marines Are Here (1938) – Navy Officer (uncredited)
- Outlaw Express (1938) – Henchman Ramon
- Prison Break (1938) – Prisoner (uncredited)
- The Wages of Sin (1938) – Bruce
- Heroes of the Hills (1938) – Connors
- Black Bandit (1938) – Henchman Cash
- Guilty Trails (1938) – Steve Yates
- Prairie Justice (1938) – Dry-Gulch Baker
- Gang Bullets (1938) – Hank Newell (uncredited)
- Honor of the West (1939) – Russ Whitley
- Convict's Code (1939) – Pete Jennings
- Risky Business (1939) – Reporter (uncredited)
- The Lone Ranger Rides Again (1939, Serial) – Logan (Ch. 1)
- Smoky Trails (1939) – Henchman Mort
- Buck Rogers (1939) – Scott
- Code of the Streets (1939) – Eddie, lying trial witness (uncredited)
- Mesquite Buckaroo (1939) – Sands
- Big Town Czar (1939) – Thompson, Luger Henchman (uncredited)
- Stunt Pilot (1939) – Reporter Trent
- Riders of the Sage (1939) – Luke Halsey
- Girl from Rio (1939) – Tony – Band Leader
- Port of Hate (1939) – Don Cameron
- Sued for Libel (1939) – Radio Actor (uncredited)
- Torture Ship (1939) – Reporter (uncredited)
- Trigger Fingers (1939) – Bert Lee, Gang Leader
- The Pal from Texas (1939) – Fox
- Flaming Lead (1939) – Hank (Rustler Leader)
- El Diablo Rides (1939) – Herb Crenshaw
- Zorro's Fighting Legion (1939, Serial) – Benito Juarez [ch 1–2, 12]
- Adventure in Diamonds (1940) – Sailor (uncredited)
- Pals of the Silver Sage (1940) – Jeff Grey
- The Cowboy from Sundown (1940) – Nick Cuttler
- Adventures of Red Ryder (1940) – Sheriff Dade
- One Man's Law (1940) – Stevens (uncredited)
- Billy the Kid Outlawed (1940) – Jeff Travis
- Gun Code (1940) – Henchman Slim Doyle
- Up in the Air (1940) – Stevens
- Billy the Kid in Texas (1940) – Gil Bonney aka Gil Cooper
- Take Me Back to Oklahoma (1940) – Ace Hutchinson
- Pride of the Bowery (1940) – Norton – Fight Promoter (uncredited)
- Billy the Kid's Gun Justice (1940) – Jeff Blanchard
- Billy the Kid's Range War (1941) – Marshal Jeff Carson
- Buck Privates (1941) – Supply Sergeant (uncredited)
- Prairie Pioneers (1941) – Army Officer (uncredited)
- Adventures of Captain Marvel (1941, Serial) – Henchman Martin [Ch. 3–9]
- Two Gun Sheriff (1941) – Townsman (uncredited)
- Billy the Kid's Fighting Pals (1941) – Jeff
- Paper Bullets (1941) – Gangster Pokey Martin (uncredited)
- Badlands of Dakota (1941) – Ben Mercer (uncredited)
- Texas (1941) – Lashan Cowhand (uncredited)
- Keep 'Em Flying (1941) – Orchestra Leader (uncredited)
- A Missouri Outlaw (1941) – Henchman Luke Allen
- Billy the Kid's Round-Up (1941) – Jeff
- Thunder River Feud (1942) – Grover Harrison
- Code of the Outlaw (1942) – Henchman
- Valley of the Sun (1942) – Nolte (uncredited)
- South of Santa Fe (1942) – Henchman Steve (uncredited)
- Gang Busters (1942, Serial) – Highway Patrolman [Chs. 8, 11] (uncredited)
- Spy Smasher (1942, Serial) – Taylor, Barn Thug [Ch. 3] / Power Clerk (uncredited)
- Overland Mail (1942, Serial) – Lem, Henchman
- King of the Mounties (1942, Serial) – Gus (ch's. 1–2) (uncredited)
- Take It or Leave It (1944) – Program Director
- Thunderhead, Son of Flicka (1945) – Maj. Harris
- Blonde Alibi (1946) – Steward (uncredited)
- Smash-Up: The Story of a Woman (1947) – Fred Elliott
- American Guerrilla in the Philippines (1950) – Col. Elliott M. Phillips (uncredited)
- Double Deal (1950) – Reno Sebastian
- The Flying Missile (1950) – Colonel (uncredited)
- Operation Pacific (1951) – Pilot Briefing Officers on Carrier (uncredited)
- Gene Autry and the Mounties (1951) – Pierre Lablond
- Best of the Badmen (1951) – Wilson
- Chain of Circumstance (1951) – Lt. Sands
- Flying Leathernecks (1951) – Col. Riley
- People Will Talk (1951) – Technician (uncredited)
- The Mob (1951) – District Attorney (uncredited)
- The Day the Earth Stood Still (1951) – Colonel in Jeep (uncredited)
- The Desert Fox: The Story of Rommel (1951) – German Staff Officer (uncredited)
- Anne of the Indies (1951) – Pirate Mate
- Red Mountain (1951) – Lt. Morgan
- Boots Malone (1952) – Racing Steward (uncredited)
- My Six Convicts (1952) – Capt. Haggarty
- Deadline - U.S.A. (1952) – Crane, Garrison's Daughters' Lawyer (uncredited)
- Diplomatic Courier (1952) – Brennan (uncredited)
- The Brigand (1952) – Carnot
- Washington Story (1952) – Congressional Clerk (uncredited)
- Army Bound (1952) – Doctor
- Toughest Man in Arizona (1952) – Cpl. Caxton (uncredited)
- Battle Zone (1952) – Colonel
- Kansas City Confidential (1952) – Martin
- The Steel Trap (1952) – Briggs, airline clerk
- Thunderbirds (1952) – Maj. Alberts (uncredited)
- Torpedo Alley (1952) – Psychiatrist
- Last of the Comanches (1953) – Maj. Lanning (uncredited)
- Salome (1953) – Officer (uncredited)
- San Antone (1953) – Confederate Office (uncredited)
- Man in the Dark (1953) – Assistant Surgeon (uncredited)
- Goldtown Ghost Riders (1953) – Jim Granby
- The Glory Brigade (1953) – Captain Hal Davis (uncredited)
- Safari Drums (1953) – Colin
- Cruisin' Down the River (1953) – Doctor (uncredited)
- A Blueprint for Murder (1953) – Ship's Det. Frank Connelly (uncredited)
- No Escape (1953) – Don Holden
- From Here to Eternity (1953) – Col. Ayres (uncredited)
- Mexican Manhunt (1953) – Slick Caruthers
- The Glenn Miller Story (1954) – Adjutant General (uncredited)
- Riot in Cell Block 11 (1954) – Guard Captain Barrett
- Bitter Creek (1954) – Quentin Allen
- Loophole (1954) – Lie Detector Technician (uncredited)
- Prince Valiant (1954) – Herald (uncredited)
- Arrow in the Dust (1954) – Maj. Andy Pepperis
- Rogue Cop (1954) – Dist. Atty. Powell (uncredited)
- Woman's World (1954) – Executive Reception Guest (uncredited)
- 20,000 Leagues Under the Sea (1954) – John Howard
- Black Tuesday (1954) – Radio Broadcaster (voice, uncredited)
- Battle Cry (1955) – Maj. Jim Wellman – Battalion Executive Officer
- The Racers (1955) – Opening Narrator (uncredited)
- Seven Angry Men (1955) – Judge (uncredited)
- Daddy Long Legs (1955) – Commission Member (uncredited)
- Artists and Models (1955) – Col. Drury (uncredited)
- The Court-Martial of Billy Mitchell (1955) – Pershing's Aide (uncredited)
- The Bottom of the Bottle (1956) – Gossipy Woman's Husband (uncredited)
- Battle Stations (1956) – Rear Admiral (uncredited)
- Great Day in the Morning (1956) – Col. Gibson
- While the City Sleeps (1956) – Police Interrogator (uncredited)
- Miami Exposé (1956) – Carruthers
- Beyond a Reasonable Doubt (1956) – Allan Kirk
- Flight to Hong Kong (1956) – Commander Larrabee (uncredited)
- Julie (1956) – Airport control tower official
- Three Brave Men (1956) – Board Chairman (uncredited)
- Official Detective (1957) TV series – episode "Bombing Terror" as Cornball Whittaker
- The Book of Acts Series (1957) – Jesus Christ
- Battle Hymn (1957) – Major Harrison
- The True Story of Jesse James (1957) – Neighboring Farmer (uncredited)
- The Spirit of St. Louis (1957) – Captain at Brooks Field Flight School (uncredited)
- Run of the Arrow (1957) – Surgeon (uncredited)
- Jet Pilot (1957) – Technical Sergeant in Palmer Field Control Tower (uncredited)
- Cry Terror! (1958) – Roger Adams
- The Perfect Furlough (1958) – Maj. Morrow (uncredited)
- The Last Hurrah (1958) – Winslow
- Here Come the Jets (1959) – Burton
- The Horse Soldiers (1959) – Col. Jonathan Miles
- North by Northwest (1959) – Fenning Nelson (uncredited)
- It Started with a Kiss (1959) – McVey (uncredited)
- Wake Me When It's Over (1960) – Radar Instructor (uncredited)
- Sergeant Rutledge (1960) – Capt. Shattuck
- The Music Box Kid (1960) – George Gordon (uncredited)
- The Gallant Hours (1960) – Col. Evans Carlson
- Spartacus (1960) – Herald (uncredited)
- Wagon Train(1960) - Dr. Colter Craven (title character)
- The Big Show (1961) – Judge Richter
- Armored Command (1961) – Capt. Bart Macklin
- Twenty Plus Two (1961) – Colonel
- The Man Who Shot Liberty Valance (1962) – Maxwell Scott
- How the West Was Won (1962) – Poker Player with Cleve (uncredited)
- A Tiger Walks (1964) – Colonel (uncredited)
- Cheyenne Autumn (1964) – Carl Schurz's Aide (uncredited)
