= Second Chance (1947 film) =

1947 film by James Tinling

- Theatrical release poster
- Directed by: James Tinling
- Screenplay by: Arnold Belgard
- Story by: Lou Breslow; John Patrick
- Produced by: Sol M. Wurtzel
- Starring: Kent Taylor; Louise Currie; Dennis Hoey; Larry J. Blake; Ann Doran; John Eldredge
- Cinematography: Benjamin H. Kline
- Edited by: Frank Baldridge
- Music by: R. Dale Butts
- Production company: 20th Century Fox
- Distributed by: 20th Century Fox
- Release date: July 18, 1947
- Running time: 63 minutes
- Country: United States
- Language: English

Second Chance is a 1947 American film noir crime film directed by James Tinling and written by Arnold Belgard. The film stars Kent Taylor, Louise Currie, Dennis Hoey, Larry J. Blake, Ann Doran and John Eldredge. The film was released on July 18, 1947, by 20th Century Fox.

== Plot ==
Joan Summers (Louise Currie) enters the office of jewel merchant Montclaire closely followed by Kendal Wolf. Each recognizes the other to be a jewel thief, and wordlessly they team together to steal a $30,000 diamond. Searched and questioned when the gem is missed, they are released ... with the gem.

Detective Sharpe is still suspicious and so is the head of Jeweler's Indemnity, who puts two underworld men on to retrieve the diamond. Kendal agrees to meet the two but the police are tipped and Sharpe confiscates the gem and the fence's money. Again Kendal and Joan are released, but each suspects the other of being an informer despite a growing romantic attachment.

Kendal and Joan attend an exhibition of the Malabar diamonds, leave to follow a diamond-laden guest, overtake her car, shoot the chauffeur and slug the woman. At Kendal's apartment, Joan makes it clear that robbery, not murder, is her game. Two men and the robbed couple arrive and reveal the whole thing to be a hoax to test whether Joan will work with the gang and to assure them she was not the informer in the first theft.

== Cast ==
- Kent Taylor as Kendal Wolf
- Louise Currie as Joan Summers
- Dennis Hoey as Roger Elwood
- Larry J. Blake as Det. Sgt. Sharpe
- Ann Doran as Doris Greene
- John Eldredge as Conrad Martyn
- Paul Guilfoyle as Nick
- William Newell as Pinky
- Guy Kingsford as Jerry
- Charles Flynn as Sam
- Eddie Fetherston as Bart
- Francis Pierlot as J.L. Montclaire
- Betty Compson as Mrs. Davenport
- Edwin Maxwell as Mr. Davenport
- Archie Twitchell as Barker
