= Julian Rivero =

American actor (1890–1976)

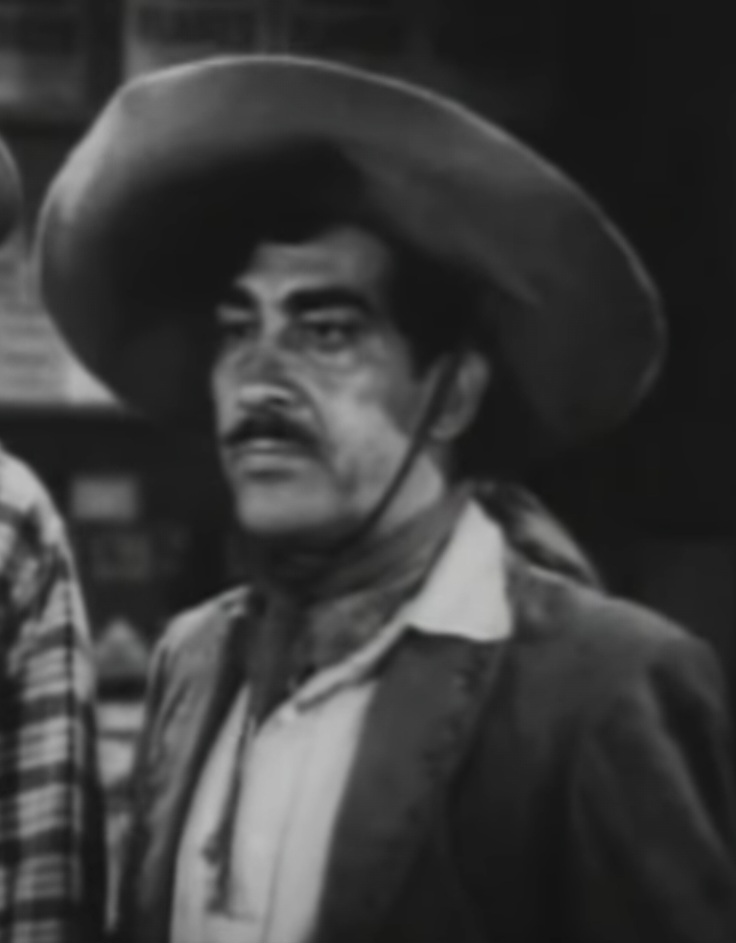
- Rivero in Death Rides the Range (1939)
- Born: July 25, 1890; San Francisco, California U.S.
- Died: February 24, 1976 (aged 85); Hollywood, California, U.S.
- Resting place: San Fernando Mission Cemetery
- Occupation: Actor
- Years active: 1923–1973
- Spouse(s): Isobel Thomas (m. 19??; d 1948)

Julian Rivero (July 25, 1890 – February 24, 1976) was an American actor whose career spanned seven decades. He made his film debut in the 1923 silent melodrama, The Bright Shawl, which starred Richard Barthelmess, Dorothy Gish, William Powell, Mary Astor, and Edward G. Robinson. Over the next 50 years, Rivero would appear in well over 200 films and television shows.

He only made a handful of appearances in silent films. With the advent of sound films, he would appear in both English language films, as well as Spanish language versions of English films, such as Así es la vida, which was the Spanish version of the 1930 film, What a Man.

== Life and career ==
Born on July 25, 1890, in San Francisco, California, Rivero did not enter the film industry until he was in his 30s. Before making his start in films, Rivero studied to become a Shakespearean actor with the famous stage actor Robert B. Mantell.

His first appearance was in a small role in the 1923 film, The Bright Shawl, which was produced by Inspiration Pictures, and the East Coast Film Company, and was shot in Cuba. His first featured role was in the 1924 western, Fast and Fearless, which starred Jay Wilsey (known by his stage name "Buffalo Bill, Jr.") and Jean Arthur. He entered sound films in 1930 with the Spanish language films Así es la vida and El presidio (the Spanish version of The Big House).

During the early 1930s, while Hollywood was still making versions of films in different languages, Rivero continued to be cast in Spanish language films, his final one being 1934's Nada más que una mujer, the Spanish version of Pursued. His first sound film in English was God's Country and the Man (1931), written and directed by J.P. McCarthy. During the 1930s and 1940s many of his roles were in westerns. Some of his more notable films during those decades include: the 1932 drama, Winner Take All, starring James Cagney; a small role in the 1935 biopic Diamond Jim, starring Edward Arnold and Jean Arthur; the role of Santa Anna in the 1937 historical drama Heroes of the Alamo; he had a small role in Betty Grable's first starring vehicle, Down Argentine Way (1940); he appeared in the bullfighting film, Blood and Sand (1941), starring Tyrone Power and Linda Darnell; he had another small role in the 1942 remake of Rio Rita, starring Abbott and Costello; he played one of the Spanish officials in the Spencer Tracy-Katharine Hepburn comedic film, Woman of the Year (1942); he played a monk in The Song of Bernadette, starring Jennifer Jones; he played a waiter in the final Laurel and Hardy film, The Bullfighters (1945); he played a government clerk in Anna and the King of Siam, starring Irene Dunne and Rex Harrison; as a manservant in the Bob Hope-Bing Crosby road picture, Road to Rio (1947); and the barber in John Huston's classic western, The Treasure of the Sierra Madre (1948).

In the 1950s, he continued appearing in small roles in films, while also acting in numerous television programs. His appearances in more notable films during that decade include: Broken Arrow (1950), starring James Stewart and Jeff Chandler; the Humphrey Bogart film noir, Sirocco (1951); Elia Kazan's classic East of Eden (1955), starring James Dean, Julie Harris and Jo Van Fleet; Giant (1956), James Dean's final film, also starring Rock Hudson and Elizabeth Taylor; the 1957 comedy Don't Go Near the Water, starring Glenn Ford, in which Rivero had a featured role; and Houseboat, a romantic comedy starring Cary Grant and Sophia Loren.

Rivero began appearing in television shows during the 1950s. His many roles during the decade include guest appearances on The Adventures of Kit Carson, Adventures of Superman, The Lone Ranger, Broken Arrow, and Rawhide. Rivero took a break from acting from 1960 through 1964, returning to his career in 1965. During the remainder of the 1960s and into the 1970s, Rivero worked almost exclusively on the small screen. His only appearance on the big screen during his final years was in the 1965 western, The Reward. He continued to be quite active in television, appearing on The Fugitive, I Spy, Family Affair, The Flying Nun, Mannix, and Medical Center. His final performance would be as "Gitano" in the 1973 television movie, The Red Pony, starring Henry Fonda and Maureen O'Hara.

Rivero died on February 24, 1976, in Hollywood, California, aged 85. He was buried next to his wife, Isobel, in the San Fernando Mission Cemetery, located in the Mission Hills section of Los Angeles. Isobel had been a Bathing Beauty for Mack Sennett prior to her marriage to Rivero.

== Filmography ==
(Per AFI database)

- Apache Love (1923) as Count de Lyons
- Open All Night (1924) as French Bicyclist (uncredited)
- Fast and Fearless (1924) as Capt. Duerta
- The Night Ship (1925) as Pedro Lopez
- Seven Chances (1925)
- Parisian Love (1925)
- The Girl from Montmartre (1926)
- The Border Whirlwind (1926) as Captain Gonzales
- Gigolo (1926) as second waiter (uncredited)
- Underworld (1927) as one of Buck's henchmen (uncredited)
- Así es la vida (1930) as Calton
- El presidio (1930) as Oliver
- Yankee Don (1931)
- La cautivadora (1931)
- La mujer X (1931) as bit role (uncredited)
- Dugan of the Badlands (1931) as Pedro
- God's Country and the Man (1931) as General Gómez
- Law and Lawless (1932) as Pancho Gonzales
- Beyond the Rockies (1932) as Lavender Joe
- Winner Take All (1932) as Joe Pice (uncredited)
- The Man from Hell's Edges (1932) as Lobo
- The Night Rider (1932) as Manuel Alonzo Valdez
- The Kid from Spain (1932) as Dalmores - prisoner in cell with Eddie (uncredited)
- Son of Oklahoma (1932) as Don Manuel Verdugo
- Lucky Larrigan (1932) as Pedro - renamed Pancho by Lucky
- The Broken Wing (1932) as Bassilio
- Via Pony Express (1933) as Antônio - Billboard Worker (uncredited)
- Man of Action (1933) as Miguel de Vallejo - sidekick
- La cruz y la espada (1934) as El Mestizo
- Nothing More Than a Woman (1934) as Hansen
- The Westerner (1934) as Antoine (uncredited)
- Burn 'Em Up Barnes (1934, Serial) as Tony
- Viva Villa! (1934) as Telegraph Operator #2 (uncredited)
- Cowboy Holiday (1934) as Pablo Escovar - aka Juarez Kid
- Western Justice (1934) as Pancho Lopez, alias Jack
- Riddle Ranch (1935) as Don Carlos
- The Sagebrush Troubadour (1935) as Pablo
- Hi, Gaucho! (1935) as Ramos - Gaucho Reporting Theft (uncredited)
- Born to Battle (1935) as Pablo Carranza
- Gun Play (1935) as young Pedro
- Goin' to Town (1935) as Bet Taker (uncredited)
- Diamond Jim (1935) as headwaiter (uncredited)
- The Melody Lingers On (1935) as Argentine reporter
- Red Salute (1935) as Pedro, Mexican Telegrapher (uncredited)
- Dancing Pirate (1936) as shepherd
- Phantom Patrol (1936) as Frenchie Le Farge
- Song of the Saddle (1936) as José
- Woman Trap (1936) as Pancho
- Lawless Land (1936) as Ortego
- Wells Fargo (1937) as Candy Vendor (uncredited)
- Heroes of the Alamo (1937) as Gen. Santa Anna
- The Mighty Treve (1937) as Pepe
- Ridin' the Lone Trail (1937) as henchman Pedro
- Love Under Fire (1937) as Staff Officer (uncredited)
- Sesenta segundos de vida (1937)
- Outlaw Express (1938) as Don Francisco Diego
- Flight into Nowhere (1938) as Martinez - Panama City Official (uncredited)
- Drifting Westward (1939) as Don Careta
- The Arizona Wildcat (1939)
- Code of the Secret Service (1939) as Juan the Jailkeeper (uncredited)
- The Girl and the Gambler (1939) as Pedro
- The Mad Empress (1939) as General Tomás Mejía
- Death Rides the Range (1939) as Pancho
- Young Buffalo Bill (1940) as Pancho
- Down Argentine Way (1940) as horse owner (uncredited)
- Green Hell (1940) as proprietor (uncredited)
- The Westerner (1940) as Juan Gomez (uncredited)
- Riders of Black Mountain (1940) as Jose
- Arizona Gang Busters (1940) as Captain Rodriguez - Rurales aka Gringo
- Billy the Kid's Gun Justice (1940) as Carlos
- Meet the Wildcat (1940) as hat peddler (uncredited)
- Billy the Kid's Fighting Pals (1941) as Lopez, bartender
- Blood and Sand (1941)
- Down Mexico Way (1941) as Don Carlos Alvarado
- Billy the Kid's Range War (1941) as Miguel Romero
- The Lone Rider Crosses the Rio (1941) as Pedro
- Bells of Capistrano (1942) as Fiesta Manager (uncredited)
- The Lone Rider in Texas Justice (1942) as Padre José
- Overland Stagecoach (1942) as Pedro, Café Owner
- Rio Rita (1942) as Mexican Gent (uncredited)
- Ship Ahoy (1942) as Photographer (uncredited)
- This Gun for Hire (1942) as man with monkey (uncredited)
- Underground Agent (1942) as Miguel Gonzales
- Woman of the Year (1942) as Spaniard (uncredited)
- The Outlaw (1943) as Pablo (uncredited)
- The Desert Song (1943) as Riff (uncredited)
- The Song of Bernadette (1943) as a Dominican friar (uncredited)
- The Falcon in Mexico (1944) as Mexican doctor (uncredited)
- Cowboy and the Senorita (1944) as cantina owner (uncredited)
- Machine Gun Mama (1944) as Alberto Cordoba
- A Bell for Adano (1945) as peasant (uncredited)
- The Bullfighters (1945) as waiter (uncredited)
- A Medal for Benny (1945)
- Mexicana (1945) as stage manager
- Pan-Americana (1945) as Pablo, driver-tour guide (uncredited)
- That Night with You (1945) as concertina player (uncredited)
- Yolanda and the Thief (1945) as brakeman (uncredited)
- Masquerade in Mexico (1945)
- Anna and the King of Siam (1946) as government clerk (uncredited)
- Cloak and Dagger (1946) as Punaro, owner of hut (uncredited)
- Trail to Mexico (1946) as Don Roberto Lopez
- Adventure Island (1947) as Uncle Ned (uncredited)
- Carnival in Costa Rica (1947) as mayor (uncredited)
- The Lost Moment (1947) as storyteller (uncredited)
- Over the Santa Fe Trail (1947) as Sheriff Romero (uncredited)
- Ride the Pink Horse (1947) as Mexican man (uncredited)
- Riffraff (1947) as El Caribe Airport Manager (uncredited)
- Road to Rio (1947) as Brazilian manservant (uncredited)
- Robin Hood of Monterey (1947) as Doctor Martinez (uncredited)
- Tycoon (1947) as priest (uncredited)
- Secret Beyond the Door (1947) as proprietor (uncredited)
- Perilous Waters (1948) as fisherman
- Bungalow 13 (1948) as beggar (uncredited)
- The Checkered Coat (1948) as café owner
- Mexican Hayride (1948) as policeman at ticket seller's booth (uncredited)
- Old Los Angeles (1948) as Diego
- To the Ends of the Earth (1948) as cab driver (uncredited)
- The Treasure of the Sierra Madre (1948) as barber (uncredited)
- The Kissing Bandit (1948) as postman (uncredited)
- Amazon Quest (1949) as Vasco
- The Bribe (1949) as Diego (uncredited)
- The Devil's Henchman (1949) as organ grinder
- South of St. Louis (1949) as wagon driver (uncredited)
- Streets of Laredo (1949) as bartender in Laredo (uncredited)
- We Were Strangers (1949) as flower vendor (uncredited)
- Belle of Old Mexico (1950) as Señor Dominguez (uncredited)
- Border Treasure (1950) as Felipe
- Broken Arrow (1950)
- Fortunes of Captain Blood (1950) as Salto (uncredited)
- Killer Shark (1950) as doctor (uncredited)
- Where Danger Lives (1950) as Pablo (uncredited)
- The Brave Bulls (1951)
- Sirocco (1951) as master sergeant (uncredited)
- The Texas Rangers (1951) as Pecos Palmer, bartender (uncredited)
- Cuban Fireball (1951) as The Reader (uncredited)
- Because of You (1952) as Mexican official (uncredited)
- A Girl in Every Port (1952) as Angelo (uncredited)
- Lone Star (1952) as Francisco (uncredited)
- Wild Horse Ambush (1952) as Enrico Espinosa
- The Adventures of Superman (1952, TV Series) as The Taxi Driver
- Appointment in Honduras (1953) as President Pietro (uncredited)
- Francis Covers the Big Town (1953) as Mr. Bruno (uncredited)
- Shadows of Tombstone (1953) as Delgado Ally
- Make Haste to Live (1954) as Carlos
- Three Hours to Kill (1954) as Dominguez (uncredited)
- Broken Lance (1954) as Manuel (uncredited)
- East of Eden (1955) as prisoner (uncredited)
- A Man Alone (1955) as Tio Rubio (uncredited)
- Strange Lady in Town (1955) as Manuel (uncredited)
- Ten Wanted Men (1955) as Mexican (uncredited)
- The Vanishing American (1955) as Etenia
- Thunder Over Arizona (1956) as Padre Ortega
- The Burning Hills (1956) as Miguel (uncredited)
- Giant (1956) as old man (uncredited)
- Don't Go Near the Water (1957) as Mr. Seguro (uncredited)
- Houseboat (1958) as Spanish diplomat (uncredited)
- The Reward (1965) as El Viejo
