= Gorilla suit =

Creature suit

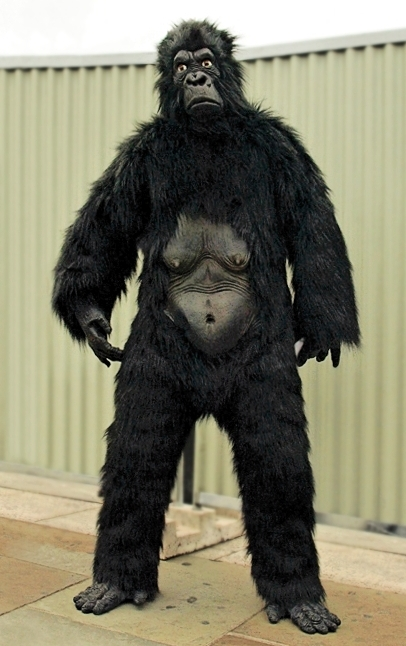
Gorilla suit

Gorilla suits are a type of creature suit resembling a gorilla. The gorilla suit is a popular Halloween and costume party costume, and is also used as a source of humour, while more realistic suits have been used to represent real gorillas in film and on stage.

== History ==
In 1869, Noah Brooks' short story, "Mr. Columbus Coriander's Gorilla" appeared in Bret Harte's Overland Monthly Magazine. The story concerned a young man employed at a menagerie dressed in a gorilla suit.

In film, gorillas are often portrayed by actors in gorilla suits. The 1918 silent film Tarzan of the Apes has the first known instance of an ape suit, worn by an uncredited actor. The early history of the art of gorilla impersonation saw the rise of Charles Gemora in the late 1920s, an early practitioner of the art in such short films as Circus Lady and the Our Gang entry Bear Shooters. Gemora's original gorilla suit was hand-made and stuffed with kapok. In later decades, in addition to abounding in the Ape Woman films (consisting of Captive Wild Woman, Jungle Woman, and The Jungle Captive) and B movies such as Bela Lugosi Meets a Brooklyn Gorilla. Other noted Hollywood gorilla performers were George Barrows, Steve Calvert, Ray Corrigan, Emil Van Horn and Janos Prohaska. Marlene Dietrich famously donned a gorilla suit in the film Blonde Venus (1932), when making a stage entrance to sing "Hot Voodoo". This moment was parodied by the character Poison Ivy in Batman & Robin (1997).

In a 1975 study nicknamed the "Invisible Gorilla Test", the problem of situational awareness was demonstrated when viewers were asked to watch carefully and count the number of times a team of basketball players wearing white passed the basketball back and forth while playing against a team wearing black. During the gameplay, a gorilla-suited human walks into the scene, stands in the midst of the players, beats his chest for a few seconds, and then exits. Because of situational awareness, a large percentage of viewers fail to notice the gorilla.

In recent decades, the work of performers or designers have altered the mechanics and effect of gorilla suits, often using animatronics, taxidermy eyes, realistic fur, and other aides. Jim Henson utilized typical gorilla suits and even a full-bodied gorilla Muppet in several productions (like in Time Piece, The Cube, some episodes of Sesame Street, and the Avery Schreiber episode of The Muppet Show). The person inside the gorilla suit is often uncredited. Jim Henson's Creature Shop has contributed to this development in its own way, through work on Buddy, George of the Jungle, and MirrorMask. Many suit performers of Henson's characters portrayed gorillas in other productions.

Gorilla suits and masks are also used to disguise their wearer. Members of the feminist artist group Guerrilla Girls maintain their anonymity by wearing gorilla masks for their public appearances. In an effort to avoid reporters, Boston Red Sox manager Theo Epstein donned a gorilla suit when he left Fenway Park after announcing his resignation in 2005.

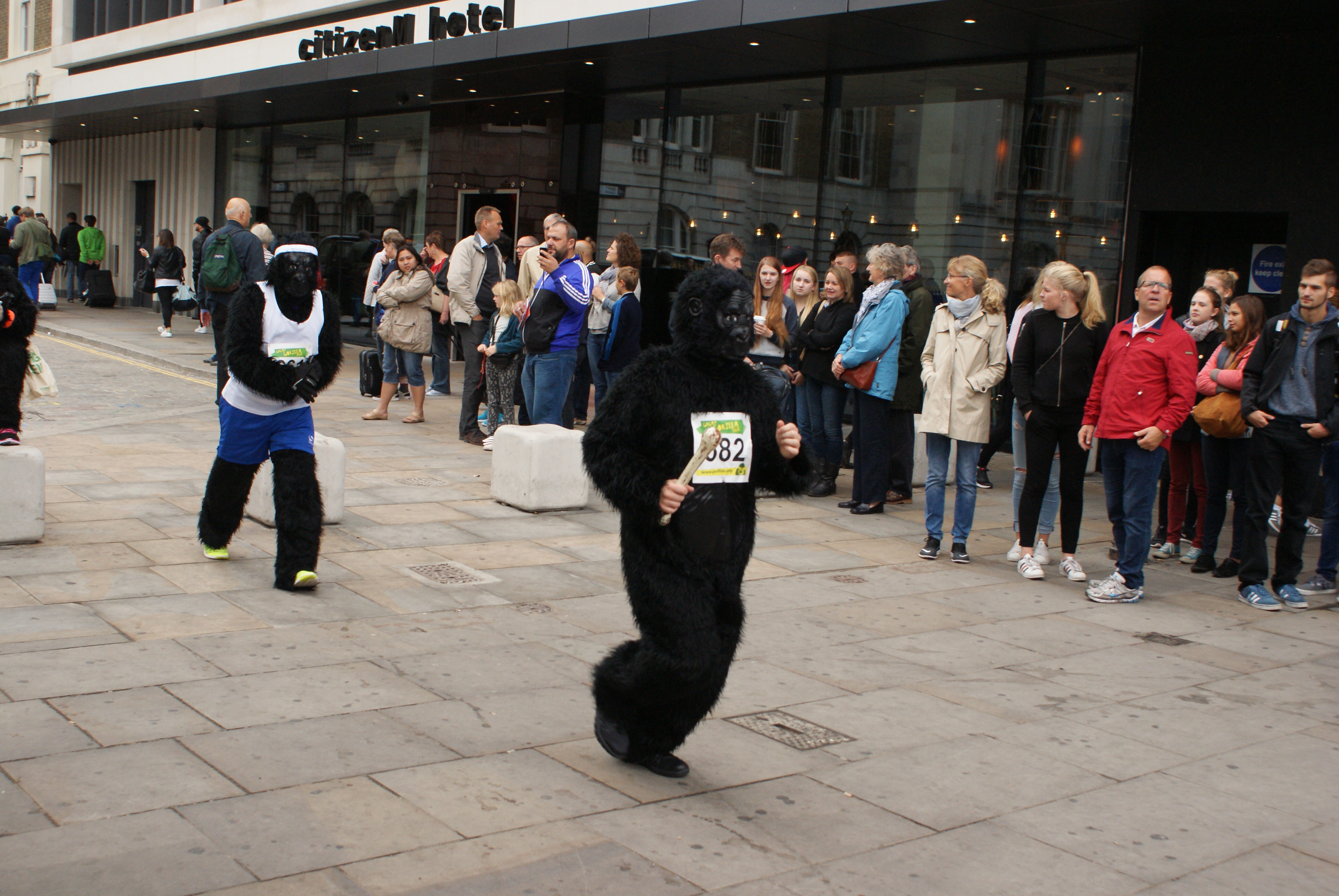
Runners at the 2013 Gorilla Run in London

During the annual Great Gorilla Runs held in North American and British cities, runners in gorilla suits take part in an eight-kilometre fun run to raise money for The Gorilla Organization. The event started in 2003 in London. Finnish racing driver Kimi Räikkönen was part of a gorilla-suited motorboat race crew in 2007 and has attended parties in a gorilla suit.

In 2013, author Dan Savage referenced gorilla suit fetishes when speaking at the University of Oregon. The gorilla suit is often used sexually in burlesque theater, stag parties, and strip shows. One episode of the reality TV show The A-List: Dallas featured male models hired to strip out of gorilla costumes to show off the skimpy underwear products underneath. Comedian Sarah Silverman posed for a Maxim cover, scantily dressed inside a gorilla suit.

In 2016, astronaut Scott Kelly wore a gorilla suit on the International Space Station, after his brother Mark Kelly (also an astronaut) had sent it up to him on a resupply mission. A video of him wearing the gorilla suit, chasing fellow astronaut Tim Peake around the space station in zero-G, went viral on YouTube in 2022.

In 2017 Francesco Gabbani won Sanremo Music Festival and took the 6th place at the Eurovision Song Contest in Kyiv accompanied by dancer Filippo Ranaldi wearing a gorilla suit.

== National Gorilla Suit Day ==
In 1963, Don Martin published the comic strip National Gorilla Suit Day in a collection Don Martin Bounces Back, in which Fester Bestertester mocks the (fictitious at the time) concept of a National Gorilla Suit Day, and suffers a series of incredible assaults from gorillas and other beasts in various human costumes. Martin and his collaborator E. Solomon Rosenblum wrote the story as a satire of the greeting card industry. "It's only an excuse for gorilla suit manufacturers to sell their products!" said Bestertester.

Subsequently, Don Martin fans have celebrated National Gorilla Suit Day on January 31.

== Gorillagrams ==
A gorillagram is a gift message, similar to a singing telegram, but delivered by a performer dressed in a gorilla suit. "Gorilla-Gram" is an abandoned trademark of Gorilla Gram Inc., first used commercially on March 20, 1980.

== See also ==
- Fursuit
- Invisible Gorilla Test
- Suitmation
