= Ingagi =

1930 film

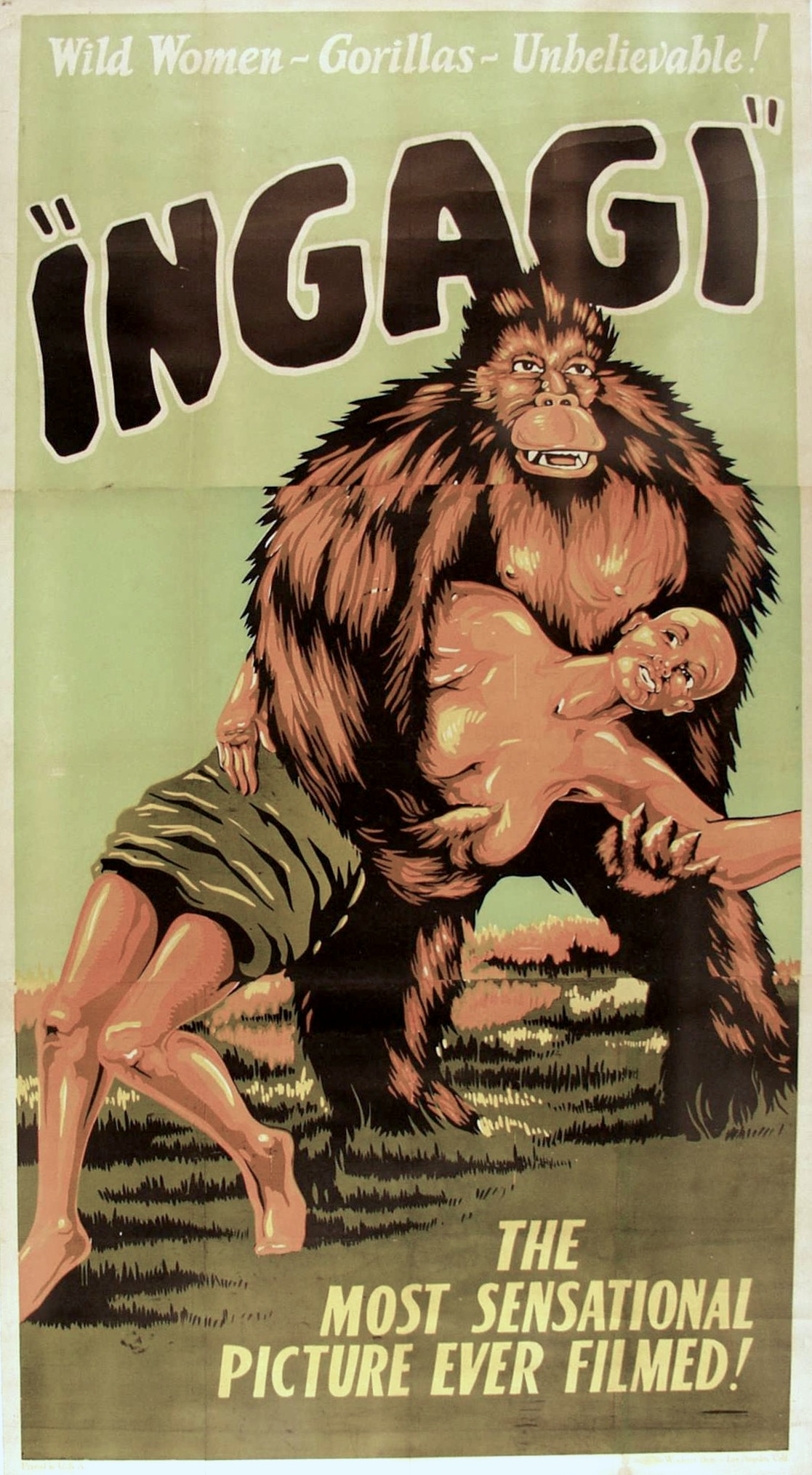
- Theatrical poster
- Directed by: William S. Campbell
- Written by: Adam Shirk
- Produced by: William Alexander
- Starring: Charlie Gemora
- Cinematography: L. Gillingham
- Music by: Edward Gage
- Production company: Congo Pictures
- Distributed by: Congo Pictures
- Release date: March 15, 1930
- Running time: 81 minutes
- Country: United States
- Language: English
- Box office: $4 million

Ingagi is a 1930 pre-Code pseudo-documentary exploitation film directed by William S. Campbell. It purports to be a documentary about "Sir Hubert Winstead" of London on an expedition to the Belgian Congo and depicts a tribe of gorilla-worshipping women encountered by the explorer.

The film claims to show a ritual in which African women are given over to gorillas as sex slaves, but in actuality was mostly filmed in Los Angeles, using American actresses in place of natives. It was produced and distributed by Nat Spitzer's Congo Pictures, which had been formed expressly for this production. Although marketed under the pretense of being ethnographic, the premise was a fabrication, leading the Motion Picture Producers and Distributors Association to retract any involvement.

The film trades heavily on its nudity and on the suggestion of bestiality between a woman and a gorilla. RKO owned several of the theatres where Ingagi was shown, including one of the first, the Orpheum Theatre in San Francisco, where it opened April 5, 1930.

== Plot ==
Ingagi (1930)

The film starts with a text introduction, explaining the purported documentary background, then shows life aboard ship before it docks at Mombasa. They then travel inland to Nairobi, seeing African wildlife such as wildebeest on the way. Along the journey, they mention the finding of a tortoise with an odd, wing-like shell and large scales that they christen a "tortorillo", just before one of the dogs they brought with was purportedly killed by its venomous bite. The expedition then finds a tribe who sacrifices virgin women to the "Ingagi" to reproduce with, and they speak of a half-human, half-gorilla hybrid offspring. It is at this point where the expedition kills one of the "Ingagi" and then return from the expedition.

== Cast ==
- Sir Hubert Winstead as Explorer
- Charles Gemora as Ingagi - the Gorilla
- Arthur Clayton as Daniel Swayne Explorer
- Louis Nizor as Narrator
- Ed Joyce as Cameraman

== Production ==
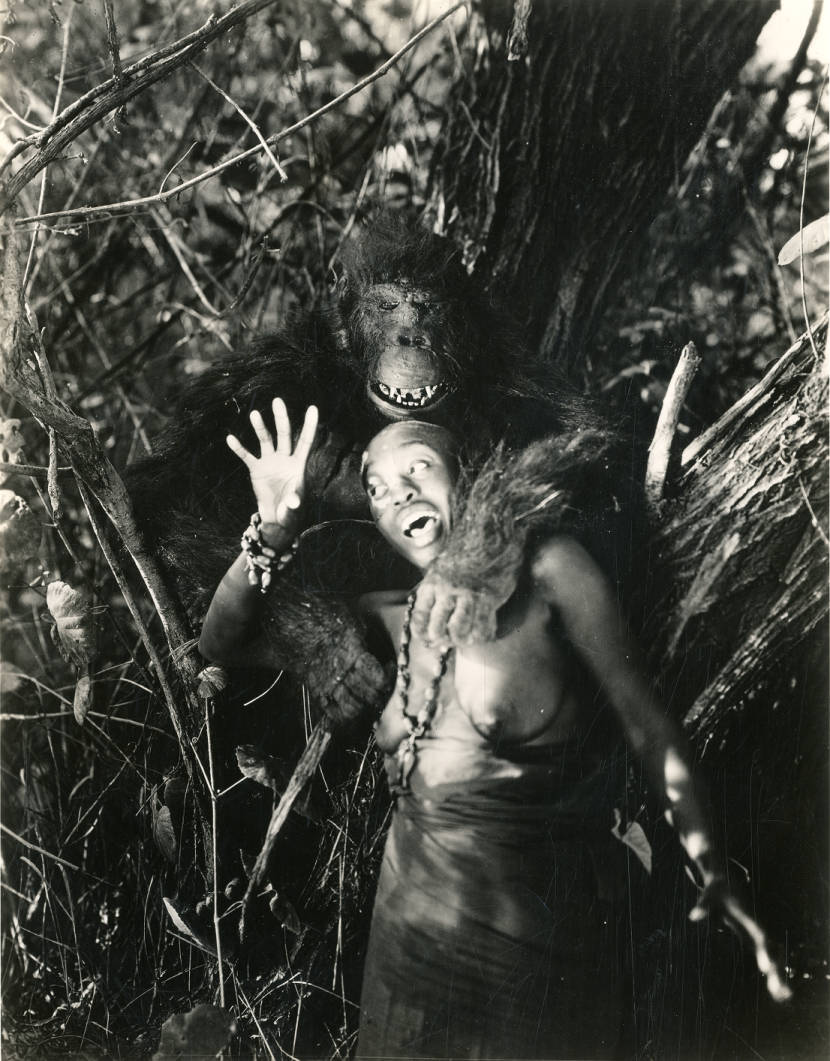
Charles Gemora in the Gorilla suit with another actor in Ingagi.

Much of the footage featured in the film was taken without permission from Grace Mackenzie's 1915 film Heart of Africa, which later resulted in legal action being brought against Congo Pictures by Mackenzie's son. The film purports to feature footage of a newly discovered animal, the "Tortadillo"; however, this animal was in fact a turtle with false wings and scales attached to it. The majority of the original footage was filmed at the Griffith Park Zoo.

The gorilla in the film is portrayed with a mixture of stock footage, much of which is actually footage of orangutans and chimpanzees, and actors in gorilla costumes. In October 1930, actor Charlie Gemora signed an affidavit swearing that he portrayed the gorilla. Actor Hilton Phillips, originally hired to play one of the African natives in the film, alleged that he also played the gorilla. Phillips later sued Congo Pictures, claiming they failed to pay him. Some of the African women portrayed in the film are white American actresses in blackface.

It was reported that Congo Pictures prepared versions of Ingagi dubbed in French, German, and Spanish. Sources have (incorrectly) (Note: ingagi does mean "gorilla" in Rwanda-Rundi) claimed that the word "ingagi" cannot be found "in any African language dictionary".

== Release ==
Following the film's release, multiple articles and reviews were published that were skeptical of the film's authenticity. In response, Congo Pictures filed a lawsuit against the MPPDA seeking $3,365,000 in damages, claiming that the MPPDA had "circulated reports doubting the authenticity of the film".

An investigation by the Federal Trade Commission concluded that the majority of the film was "false, fraudulent, deceptive and misleading", and ordered Congo Pictures to withdraw any advertising and material from the film proclaiming it to be genuine. As a result, the film was pulled from circulation. The Federal Trade Commission removed its sanction on the film in 1947.

In partnership with Something Weird Video, Kino Classics released a 4K restoration of the film on Blu-ray Disc on January 5, 2021.

== Critical reception ==
Film critic Mordaunt Hall wrote in The New York Times that the film "is a loose assemblage of the usual African travel scenes, many of which are spoiled by extraordinarily bad photography," that "the screen is a miserable blur for minutes at a time," that "the scenes with gorillas last about ten minutes and are not at all convincing," but noted that "the trapping of a leopard, the capture of a giant python and a hippopotamus hunt might be genuinely interesting." A contemporary review of the film in Variety reported that "photography is poor" and "the ape women are seen completely naked, but shadowed in a clearing [and] they are not as black as expected for the jungle" with "doubt concerning the naturalness of the gorilla," but noted that "there is a gripping scene when a lioness attacks a cameraman [with] no doubt of the authenticity of this frightful but vivid scene." A review from the Houston Chronicle called Ingagi “an effort to obtain money under false pretenses and a deliberate propagation of fabrications in the name of science. It is howlingly ridiculous, so obviously fake that one forgets to resent it.”

From retrospective reviews, Michael Atkinson reviewed the home video release in Sight & Sound. Atkinson found the film "distinctive for portending [sic] to be something it absolutely is not", noting the film's litany of large animals killed and butchered and its "wall to wall" supremacist stereotypes, while finding the footage taken from other films uproarious. A review of the film on DVD Talk noted that it is "fascinating even if it's not entirely fun. There's definitely some interest in the classic wildlife footage, but the continued brutality of the hunters (which admittedly is not shown as explicitly as it could be) eventually becomes deadening. And the way the black characters are treated – whether it's the actual African natives put down by the narration or the American actors put into demeaning situations – is so offputting and infuriating that it would derail any self-respecting Bad Movie Night."

== Follow-ups ==
Congo Pictures followed Ingagi with an unsuccessful film titled Nu-Ma-Pu – Cannibalism in 1931, featuring much of the same crew. Like Ingagi, it purported to be a documentary, but was mostly fictitious. The 1937 film Love Life of a Gorilla likely borrows footage from Ingagi, as contemporary plot descriptions mention a character named "Colonel Hubert Winstead". In 1947, Charlie Gemora announced his plans to direct and star in a jungle adventure movie that contemporary newspapers described as a sequel of Ingagi. However, the project never came to fruition.

== See also ==
- Congorilla, 1932 film
- Bring 'Em Back Alive,1932 film

== Sources ==
- Atkinson, Michael (May 2021). "Ingagi". Sight & Sound. Vol. 31, no. 4. p. 84.
- Berenstein, Rhona J. "White Heroines and Hearts of Darkness: Race, Gender and Disguise in 1930s Jungle Films", in Film History Vol. 6 No. 3 (Autumn 1994), Exploitation Films, pp. 314–339 (Published by Indiana University Press); JSTOR 3814926
- Doherty, Thomas Patrick (1999). Pre-Code Hollywood: Sex, Immorality, and Insurrection in American Cinema 1930–1934. New York: Columbia University Press. ISBN 0-231-11094-4.
