= Steve Calvert =

American actor (1916–91)

- Born: William Seeger; June 28, 1916; Peoria, Illinois
- Died: March 5, 1991 (aged 74); Los Angeles County, California
- Occupation: Gorilla suit performer
- Children: 3

Steve Calvert (June 28, 1916 – March 5, 1991) was a prolific gorilla suit performer in many Hollywood films and television shows from the late 1940s through the 1950s. He took the stage name Calvert from Calvert Whisky.

== Biography ==
Calvert knew many film stars from his career as head bartender at Ciro's, a Sunset Boulevard nightclub, and worked occasionally as a stand in and stunt performer. When he got to know Robert Lowery as the actor's stand-in in 1948, Lowery was able to get Calvert into the Screen Actor's Guild. That same year, Ray Corrigan whom Calvert knew and admired, sold Calvert his gorilla suits, which he had used in a multitude of Hollywood films, for a down payment of $1800, also providing some acting pointers. He began to follow in Corrigan's paw prints in lesser Hollywood fare making his debut in the first Jungle Jim film in 1948, earning the amount of the down payment.

Calvert appeared in Bride of the Gorilla, The Bowery Boys Meet the Monsters, the serial Panther Girl of the Kongo, Ed Wood's The Bride and the Beast, in Road to Bali with Bob Hope and Bing Crosby and appeared in the second part of the title role of Bela Lugosi Meets a Brooklyn Gorilla. Subsequently, Calvert appeared again with Lugosi at the 1953 Hollywood premiere of House of Wax, at which Lugosi arrived in his Dracula costume, leading the furry-suited Calvert on a leash.

Among his television work is at least one appearance with Buster Keaton which Calvert called "the best thing I ever did. He was a pure pantomime artist." and an episode of Adventures of Superman, "Jungle Devil." In the tradition of other gorilla men playing space monsters, Calvert played a robot that was meant to be an entire army of robots in Target Earth as well as the robot in The Bowery Boys Meet the Monsters in scenes which did not involve the ape. Circus clown Billy Small frequently came aboard when Calvert needed a second "ape," such as in Bride and the Beast.

Dismayed by a lack of steady work and suffering a heart attack, Calvert retired from film work in 1960. That year, Target Earth producer Herman Cohen approached Calvert about playing the title role in Konga, but as Calvert had sold his costumes to Western Costume, Cohen was forced to rent an alternate ape suit from stuntman/actor George Barrows, though Barrows himself did not appear in the suit in the film.

== Personal life ==
Calvert had two daughters and a son. A widower, Calvert was a carpenter in his later years, and an active member of Alcoholics Anonymous. He died in Los Angeles, aged 74, in 1991.
