= The Ape Man =

1943 film by William Beaudine

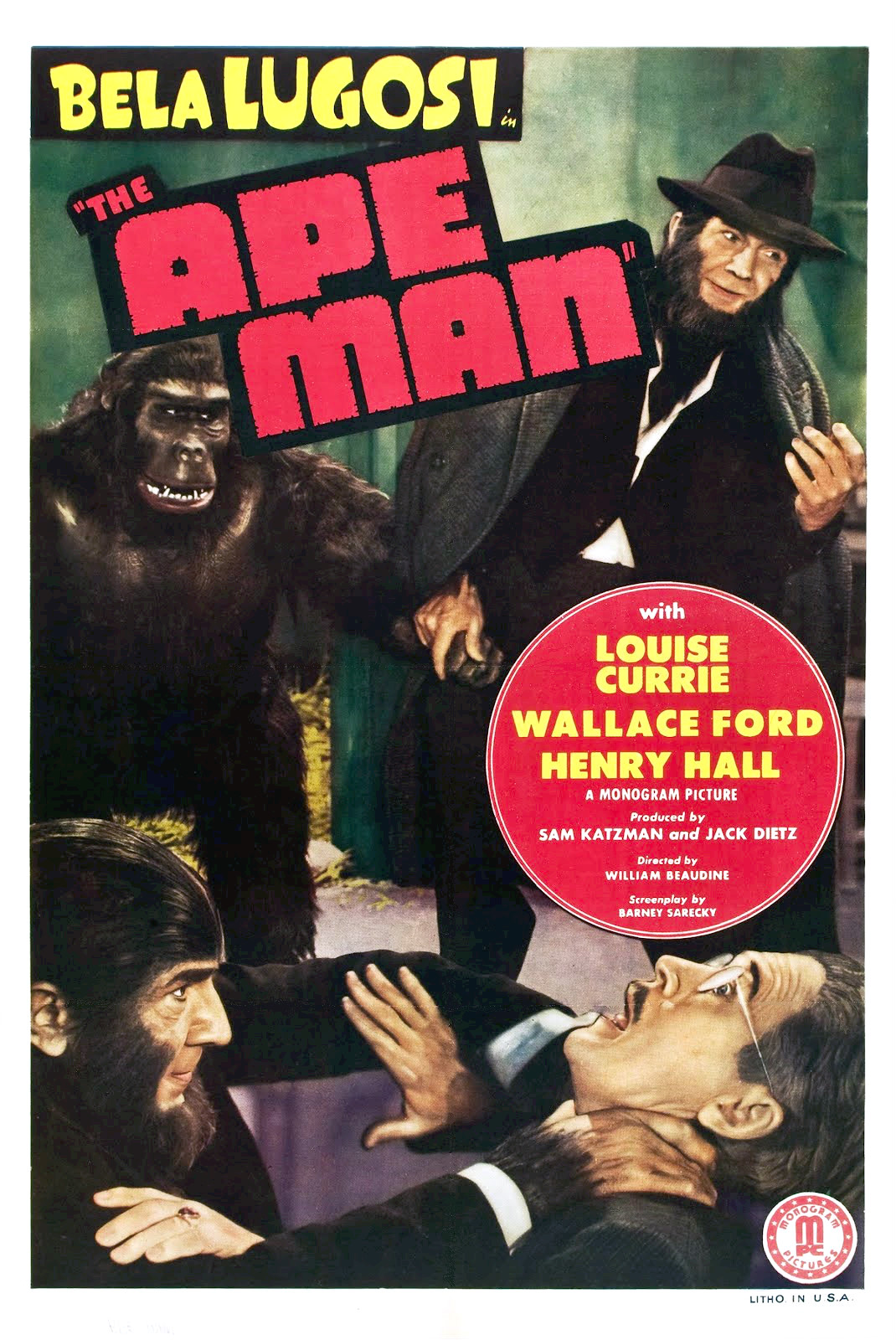
- Directed by: William Beaudine
- Screenplay by: Barney Sarecky
- Based on: "They Creep in the Dark" by Karl Brown
- Produced by: Sam Katzman; Jack Dietz
- Starring: Bela Lugosi; Louise Currie; Wallace Ford; Henry Hall
- Cinematography: Mack Stengler
- Edited by: Carl Pierson
- Production company: Banner Productions
- Distributed by: Monogram Pictures Corp.
- Release date: 19 March 1943
- Country: United States
- Language: English

The Ape Man is a 1943 American horror film directed by William Beaudine. The film is based on "They Creep in the Dark" by Karl Brown, which was published in The Saturday Evening Post. It stars Bela Lugosi as Dr. James Brewster who is aided by his colleague Dr. Randall (Henry Hall). The doctor manages to transform himself into an ape man hybrid and desperately seeks a cure. Brewster believes that only the injection of human spinal fluid will prove effective as a cure. As Randall refuses to help him, Brewster and his captive gorilla seek involuntary donors.

The film was announced in November 1942, began shooting in December and was released in March by Monogram Pictures Corp. The film received negative reviews from Variety, The Hollywood Reporter and The Daily News. An in-name-only sequel, Return of the Ape Man, was released in 1944.

== Plot ==
Dr. James Brewster and his colleague Dr. Randall are involved in a series of scientific experiments which have caused Brewster to transform into an ape-man. In an attempt to obtain a cure, Brewster must inject himself with recently drawn human spinal fluid. Reporter Jeff Carter and photographer Billie Mason are on assignment initially suggested by an odd man investigating the recent disappearance of Dr. Brewster.

Before interviewing Brewster's sister Agatha, a "ghost-hunter", they hear strange sounds outside the house. After Dr. Randall's butler is murdered and the only clue is a fistful of ape-like hair, Carter deduces that the ghostly sounds they heard may well have been from an ape. Carter returns to investigate further. Dr. Randall informs Agatha that he will not help her brother again – and will go to the police if necessary. Needing more of the fluid as its effects are only temporary, Brewster and his gorilla go on a killing spree as the odd character appears yet again – saving one of the potential victims.

Brewster returns to Dr. Randall demanding he inject the fluid. When Randall breaks the precious vial on the doctor's floor, the enraged Brewster strangles him. Carter and Mason return to Brewster's home separately. While cautiously investigating, Billie knocks Jeff unconscious. Dr. Brewster then carries the photographer off to his basement lab – to again withdraw more spinal fluid. Carter regains consciousness and while he and the police attempt to break into the secret basement entrance, Brewster is attacked by the gorilla. The gorilla breaks Brewster's back, killing him. As Billie is let out of the secret room, the gorilla that followed her is shot by the police. Agatha enters the secret room and finds Brewster dead.

Jeff and Billie leave together and are met by the odd character who is sitting in Jeff's car. When Jeff finally asks who he is, the man replies "Me? I'm the author of the story!" He then breaks the fourth wall by quoting "Screwy idea, wasn't it?" The author then rolls up the car window as the words "THE END" appears on the glass.

== Cast ==
Cast adapted from The American Film Institute.

- Bela Lugosi as Dr. James Brewster
- Louise Currie as Billie Mason
- Wallace Ford as Jeff Carter
- Henry Hall as Dr. George Randall
- Minerva Urecal as Agatha Brewster
- Emil Van Horn as the Ape
- J. Farrell MacDonald as the Police Captain
- Wheeler Oakman as Brady
- Ralph Littlefield as Zippo
- Jack Mulhall as a Reporter
- Sunshine Sammy Morrison as a Copy Boy

== Production ==
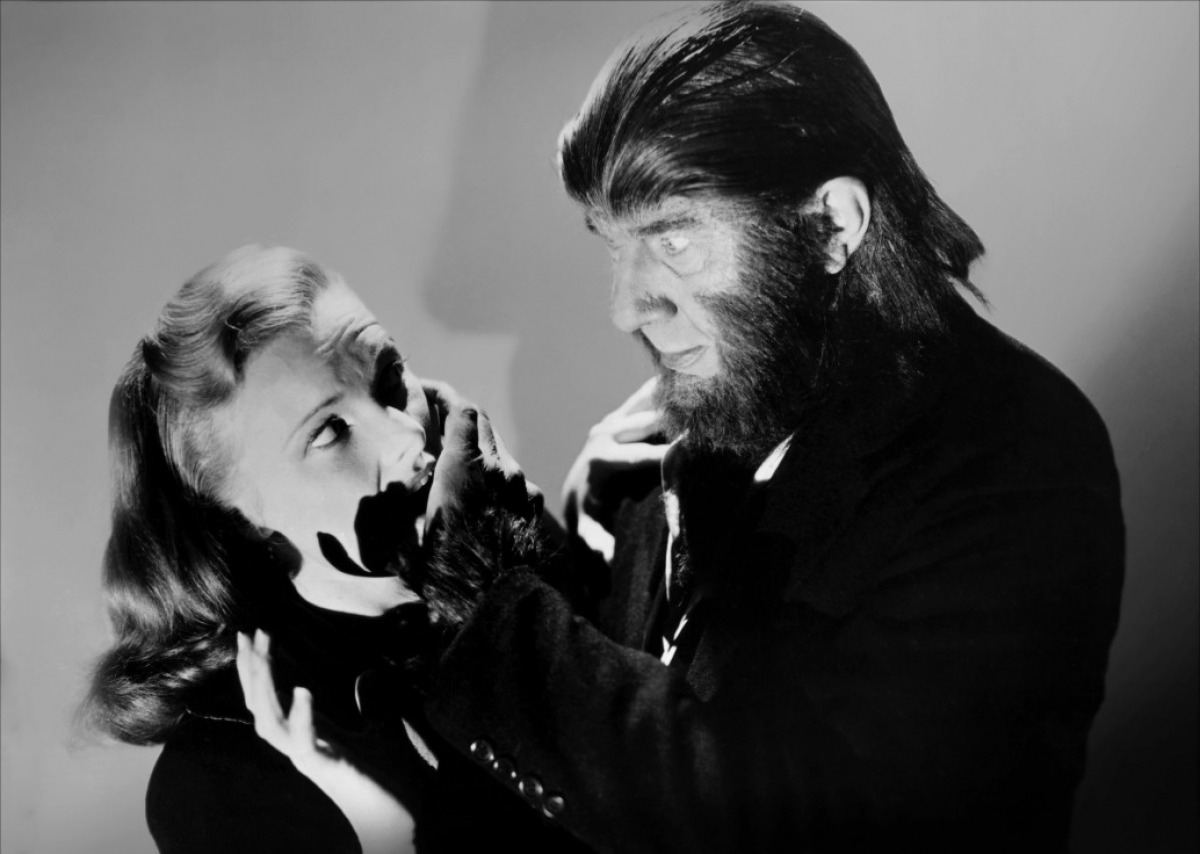
Louise Currie and Béla Lugosi

The film was initially announced as The Gorilla Strikes on November 4, 1942. The Ape Man was based on "They Creep in the Dark" by Karl Brown that was published in The Saturday Evening Post. Brown had previously written scripts for Boris Karloff films for Columbia Pictures, such as The Man They Could Not Hang (1939) and The Man With Nine Lives (1940). The film's screenplay was by the film's associate producer Barney Sarecky.

The film was announced initially as having Amelita Ward in the cast. She was replaced with Louise Currie. The production began filming on December 16 and was already re-titled The Ape Man. Currie recalled working on the film, noting how low-budget Monogram Pictures was, stating she had to wear her own clothes for their films as the studio did not have a wardrobe department.

== Release ==
The Ape Man was released on March 19, 1943. It was distributed by Monogram Pictures Corp. In the United Kingdom, the film was released as Lock Your Doors. In 1950, the film was screened under the title They Creep in the Dark.

Monogram later released the film Return of the Ape Man in 1944 and marketed it as the "shock-sequel". Historian Tom Weaver noted that the film is not a direct sequel to The Ape Man.

== Reception ==
From contemporary reviews, a review in Variety stated The Ape Man was "good for laughs which aren't in the script". The Daily News also commented on the script declaring that "Monogram's writer didn't have to wipe the dust off of Bela Lugosi's Ape Man, he had to rake the mould off." The Hollywood Reporter declared Lugosi's make-up in the film "horrible". A critic for the Los Angeles Times gave a positive review stating that "chill chasers will get a tremendous thrill out of the picture, while the more detached will obtain laughs of out of the slyly satirical moments".

From retrospective reviews, Weaver wrote in his book Poverty Row Horrors! that the film was "one of Lugosi's livelier and more entertaining" films he made with Monogram, while stating the plot was "flimsy" and the characters were "barely sketched." The film was reviewed by The New York Times for a home video release, which dismissed the film as an "unscary Lugosi vehicle" and that "the movie isn't quite campy enough to be entertaining."

== Home media ==
After countless poor quality VHS and DVD releases due to its public domain status, the film was released on Blu-ray in 2020 by Retromedia in a double-feature with the Boris Karloff film Doomed to Die, mastered from superior film elements than had previously been used.

== See also ==
- Bela Lugosi filmography
- List of American films of 1943
- List of horror films of the 1940s
