= Charles Gemora =

American makeup artist and actor (1903–1961)

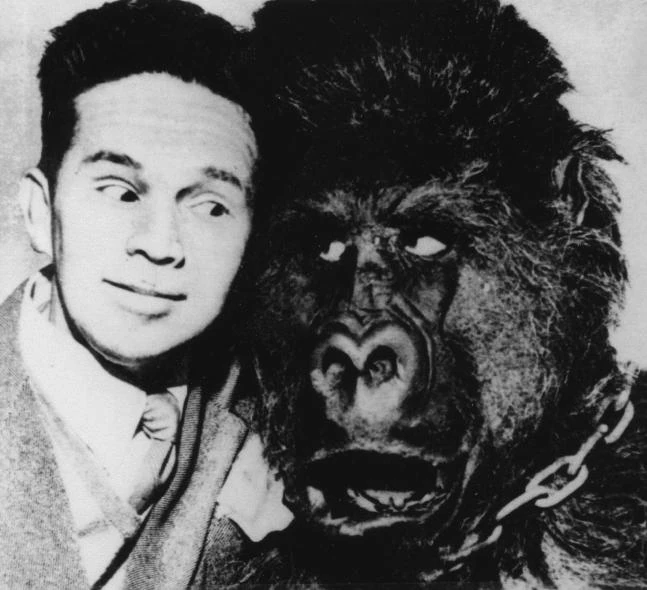
- Gemora with his suit c. 1947
- Born: Carlos Cruz Gemora; June 15, 1903; Negros, Philippine Islands (now Philippines)
- Died: August 19, 1961 (aged 58); Los Angeles, California, U.S.
- Occupations: Makeup artist, actor
- Years active: 1923–1961

Carlos Cruz Gemora (June 15, 1903 – August 19, 1961), commonly known as Charles Gemora, was a Filipino-American actor, makeup artist, and stunt performer. He was known for his prolific appearances in many Hollywood films while wearing a gorilla suit. He became the "go-to" actor whenever a gorilla character appeared in a film.

== Early life ==
The youngest of nine children, Carlos Cruz Gemora was born in 1903 on Negros in the Philippines, then governed by the United States of America as the Insular Government of the Philippine Islands. His parents were wealthy, owning several oil wells throughout the island. After the death of his father, he ran away from home but was found by his family and sent to a monastery. There he studied art books.

Aged 15, Gemora stowed away on a ship bound for San Francisco and began working on fruit and dairy farms in the United States. He was adopted into the family of George Westmore, an English hairdresser who later became a prominent makeup artist in Hollywood. After developing a talent for drawing, sculpting and makeup, Gemora won an art contest in 1922, which inspired him to seek work as an artist in Hollywood.

== Career ==
Gemora worked as an extra in the 1923 film The Hunchback of Notre Dame for Universal Pictures before being hired as a set designer. He designed a gorilla suit for the 1925 film The Lost World. From there he designed and wore gorilla suits in many films. He studied gorillas at the San Diego Zoo and worked to create increasingly accurate and complex gorilla suits with accurate proportions, moving jaws, and curling lips. According to his daughter Diana, he crocheted three yak hairs at a time into each suit.

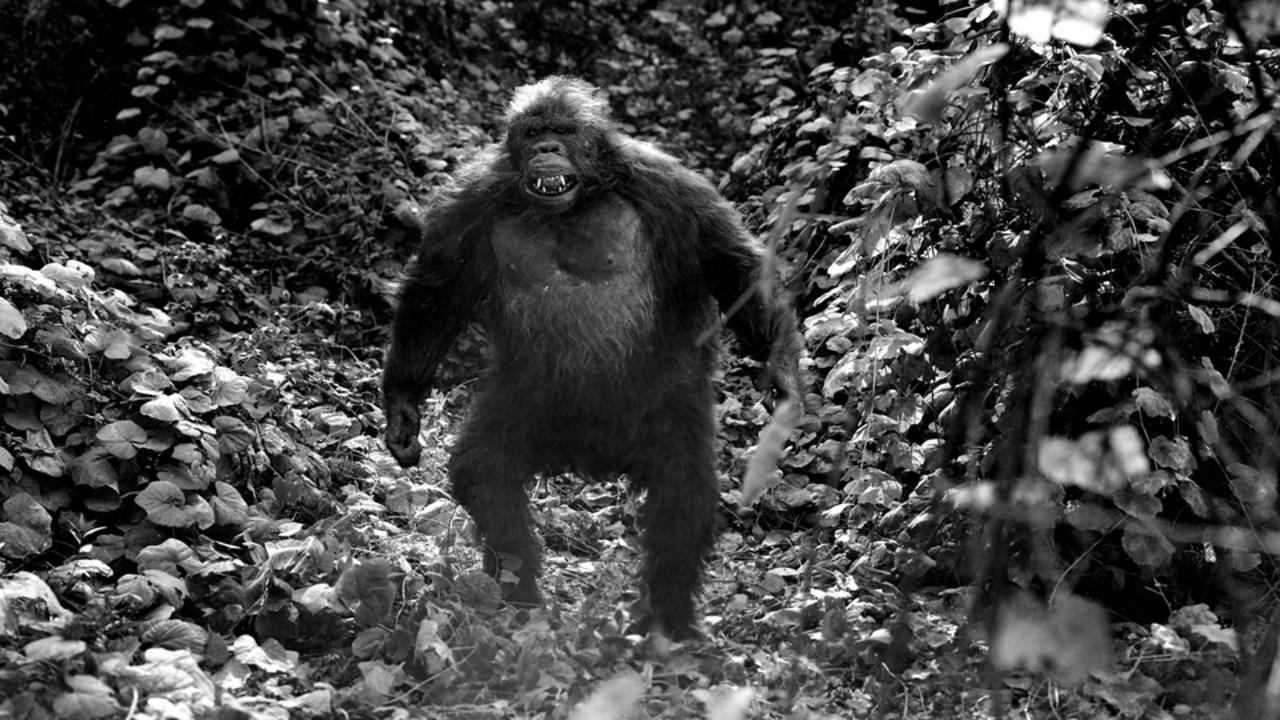
Gemora as a gorilla in Ingagi

Gemora was known for his comedic portrayal of gorillas and appeared in comedy films alongside talents such as Wheeler & Woolsey, Andy Clyde, Edward Everett Horton, Thelma Todd, the Marx Brothers, and Laurel and Hardy. He faced scandal over his appearance in the 1930 film Ingagi, which was falsely presented as a documentary film. Due to the controversy surrounding the film, he signed an affidavit confirming that he had portrayed the gorilla in it. He was kept in a cage while on the set of the 1932 film Island of Lost Souls because the film's promotion department wanted to maintain the illusion that the film used a real gorilla. According to his daughter Diana, Charles Gemora likely appeared in over 1,000 films.

When men in gorilla suits became less popular in Hollywood films, Gemora began working on science fiction films. His most well-known design was the Martian in the 1953 film The War of the Worlds. In his later years he worked as a film makeup artist, with the final film he worked on being One-Eyed Jacks in 1961.

== Personal life ==
Gemora married Isabel "Belle" Fyffe in 1938. They had three children, Diana, Robert and Patrick. He died from a heart attack at 58 years old in 1961.
