= Clauser =

Clauser is a surname. Notable people with the surname include:

- Al Clauser (1911–1989), American guitarist, songwriter, and engineer
- John Clauser (born 1942), American physicist
- Suzanne Clauser (1926–2016), American television writer

== See also ==
- Clausen
