= Federal Man =

- Directed by: Robert Emmett Tansey
- Written by: Sam Neuman; Nat Tanchuck
- Produced by: Jack Schwarz
- Starring: William Henry; Pamela Blake; Robert Shayne
- Cinematography: Clark Ramsey
- Edited by: Reg Browne
- Music by: Darrell Calker
- Production company: Jack Schwarz Productions
- Distributed by: Eagle-Lion Films
- Release date: June 21, 1950
- Running time: 67 minutes
- Country: United States
- Language: English

Federal Man is a 1950 American crime film directed by Robert Emmett Tansey and starring William Henry, Pamela Blake and Robert Shayne.

== Cast ==
- William Henry as Phil Sherrin
- Pamela Blake as Judith Palmer
- Robert Shanye as Charles Stuart
- Lyle Talbot as Agent Johnson
- Movita as Lolita
- Lori Irving as Betty Herbert
- John Laurenz as Rodriguez
- Ben Moselle as Mack
- George Eldredge as Wade Brandon
- Dennis Moore as Harry

== Bibliography ==
- Hardy, Phil. The BFI Companion to Crime. A&C Black, 1997.
