= Rootin' Tootin' Rhythm =

1937 film by Mack V. Wright

- Theatrical release poster
- Directed by: Mack V. Wright
- Screenplay by: Jack Natteford
- Story by: Johnston McCulley
- Produced by: Armand Schaefer
- Starring: Gene Autry; Smiley Burnette; Armida
- Cinematography: William Nobles
- Edited by: Tony Martinelli; Lester Orlebeck (uncredited)
- Music by: Raoul Kraushaar (supervisor)
- Production company: Republic Pictures
- Distributed by: Republic Pictures
- Release date: May 12, 1937 (U.S.)
- Running time: 61 minutes
- Country: United States
- Language: English
- Budget: $23,500

Rootin' Tootin' Rhythm is a 1937 American Western film directed by Mack V. Wright and starring Gene Autry, Smiley Burnette, and Armida. Based on a story by Johnston McCulley, the film is about two cowboys who assume the identities of dead outlaws in order to stop a bunch of cattle rustlers, later discovering that the outlaws are far from dead.

== Plot ==
Gene Autry (Gene Autry) and his sidekick Frog Millhouse (Smiley Burnette) decide to leave Gene's ranch in order to pursue cattle rustlers who have been terrorizing the range. The men they are following, the Apache Kid (Max Hoffman Jr.) and Black Jim (Charles King), kill two lawmen and exchange clothes with them. When Gene and Frog discover the bodies, they decide to take their clothes and, disguised as wanted outlaws, head for the border.

Gene discovers that Joe Stafford (Monte Blue), a supposed upstanding head of the cattlemen's association, is the boss behind the rustling gang. When Stafford's niece, Rosa Montero (Armida), and his stepdaughter Mary Ellen (Ann Pendleton) mistake Gene and Frog for the Apache Kid and Black Jim, they turn them in to the deputies, who turn out to be the real outlaws in disguise.

Gene and Frog are able to escape, and with the help of Gene's partner, Buffalo Bradey (Hal Taliaferro), and a group of singing cowhands, who eventually reveal themselves to be Texas Rangers, the rustlers are captured. After Stafford is killed, Gene and Frog return to Gene's ranch.

== Cast ==
- Gene Autry as Gene Autry
- Smiley Burnette as Frog Millhouse
- Armida as Rosa Montero
- Monte Blue as Joe Stafford
- Al Clauser and His Oklahoma Outlaws as Singing Cowhands
- Champion as Champion, Gene's Horse
- Hal Taliaferro as Buffalo Brady
- Ann Pendleton as Mary Ellen Stafford, Joe's step-daughter
- Max Hoffman Jr. as Jed, the Apache Kid
- Charles King as Jim Black
- Frankie Marvin as Hank
- Nina Campana as Ynez
- Gonzalo Meroño as Richard Steward
- Charles Meyers as Charlie

== Production ==
=== Casting ===
Mexican-born actress Armida was paid significantly more than Autry's past female co-stars, $750, for her appearance in Rootin' Tootin' Rhythm. According to Autry, she helped him to sing Spanish lyrics to film songs.

=== Filming and budget ===
Rootin' Tootin' Rhythm was filmed March 10–20, 1937. The film had an operating budget of $23,500 (equal to $526,302 today), and a negative cost of $33,034.

=== Stuntwork ===
- Yakima Canutt
- Ken Cooper (Gene Autry's stunt double)
- Augie Gomex (Armida's stunt double)
- Buck Spencer (Smiley Burnette's stunt double)

=== Filming locations ===
- Alabama Hills, Lone Pine, California, USA
- Victorville, California, USA

=== Soundtrack ===
- "The Old Home Place" (Fleming Allen, Jack Natteford) by Gene Autry, Smiley Burnette, Hal Taliaferro, Al Clauser and His Oklahoma Outlaws and guests at the party
- "Little Black Bronc" (Al Clauser, Tex Hoepner) by Smiley Burnette at the party
- "Untitled Composition" an instrumental played at the party
- "I Hate to Say Goodbye to the Prairie" (Gene Autry) by Gene Autry and Al Clauser and His Oklahoma Outlaws
- "Mexicali Rose" (Jack Tenney, Helen Stone) by Gene Autry
- "Mexicali Rose" (Jack Tenney, Helen Stone) by Gene Autry with Armida
- "Untitled Dance Music" by Smiley Burnette (accordion) and Armida and Nina Campana in dance
- "Trail of the Mountain Rose" (Al Clauser, Tex Hoepner) by Al Clauser and His Oklahoma Outlaws
- "The Dying Cowgirl" (Gene Autry) by Smiley Burnette

== Memorable quotes ==
- Bartender: What'll it be, strangers?

Frog Millhouse: I'd like a glass of milk.
Gene Autry: [elbows Frog] Aw, he's always kidding. We'll drink whiskey straight and wash it down with lye.
