= Outlaw Treasure =

1955 film

- Directed by: Oliver Drake
- Written by: Johnny Carpenter
- Starring: Johnny Carpenter (as "John Forbes"); Adele Jergens; Glenn Langan
- Production company: Wheeler Company Production
- Distributed by: American Releasing Corporation
- Release date: May 15, 1955
- Running time: 60 minutes
- Country: United States
- Language: English

Outlaw Treasure is a 1955 American Western film directed by Oliver Drake and starring Johnny Carpenter, Adele Jergens, and Glenn Langan. It was one of the first movies released by American Releasing Corporation, which later became American International Pictures. (Samuel Z. Arkoff of AIP had worked with Johnny Carpenter previously on The Lawless Rider.)

== Plot ==
U.S. Cavalry trooper Dan Parker is asked by Major Cooper to catch a Nevada rustler known as "Black Jack." He does, but then is double-crossed and shot by a fellow soldier, Lt. Burke, who is in cahoots with the thief.

Not knowing about Burke's deceit, the major sends him to California to investigate a land swindler, Sam Casey. It turns out Casey is pretending to be "Black Jack" and is part of the Jesse James outlaw gang. Parker recovers from his gunshot wound and leaves for California, where his father owns a ranch.

Casey, helped by hired gun Ace Harkey and a crooked sheriff, is trying to move a half-million dollars in stolen gold. His honest secretary, Rita Starr, tries to inform the law, but Dan's dad is killed. Burke objects to Casey's methods and is also murdered. Dan shoots it out with Casey, is victorious and stays in town, retiring from the Cavalry, to settle down with Rita.

== Cast ==
- Johnny Carpenter as Dan Parker
- Adele Jergens as Rita
- Glenn Langan as Casey
- Harry Lauter as Jesse James
- Hal Baylor as Ace Harkey
- Michael Whalen as Maj. Cooper

== See also ==
- List of American films of 1955
