= Career Girl (1944 film) =

1944 film by Wallace Fox

- Original film poster
- Directed by: Wallace Fox
- Written by: David Silverstein (story) and Stanley Rauh (story); Sam Neuman (screenplay)
- Produced by: Harry D. Edwards (associate producer); Jack Schwarz (producer)
- Starring: See below
- Cinematography: Gus Peterson
- Edited by: Robert O. Crandall
- Music by: Rudy Schrager
- Distributed by: Producers Releasing Corporation
- Release date: January 11, 1944
- Running time: 69 minutes
- Country: United States
- Language: English

This paragraph would be clearer if the name of Joan's fiancé, James Blake was inserted and it read:

Joan has a further problem when her impatient fiancé, James Blake, a Kansas City coal mines owner, orders her to return home in failure to become his meek housewife. When she carries on in her plans, he arrives in New York to sabotage her aspiring career. He buys out her show, intending to close it. But one actress, Sue Collins, is so hurt that she won't get her big break that she runs outside and is hit by a car. Blake sees the error of his ways and backs the show's opening and concedes Joan's affections to fellow millionaire Steve Dexter, who is more favorably inclined towards Joan's career.

Career Girl is a 1944 American musical film directed by Wallace Fox and starring Frances Langford. It was PRC's answer to Columbia's Cover Girl.

This film is in the public domain.

== Plot ==
Kansas City girl Joan Terry has come to New York to conquer Broadway as thousands have before her. Advised to maintain an appearance of wealth, she has been living in an expensive hotel until she is discovered. With no offers coming in she moves to an economical women's boarding house full of equally unsuccessful actresses, singers, and dancers.

However, when Joan demonstrates her ability in the traditional newcomer's show for the residents, the girls recognize her considerable talent and form a corporation to support her until she is discovered and can pay them back from her earnings.

Joan has a further problem when her impatient fiancé, a Kansas City coal mines owner, orders her to return home in failure to become his meek housewife. When she carries on in her plans, he arrives in New York to sabotage her aspiring career. He buys out her show, intending to close it. But one actress, Sue Collins, is so hurt that she won't get her big break that she runs outside and is hit by a car. Blake sees the error of his ways and backs the show's opening and concedes Joan's affections to fellow millionaire Steve Dexter, who is more favorably inclined towards Joan's career.

== Cast ==
- Frances Langford as Joan Terry
- Edward Norris as Steve Dexter
- Iris Adrian as Glenda Benton
- Craig Woods as James Blake
- Linda Brent as Thelma Mason
- Alec Craig as Theodore "Pop" Billings, the Landlord
- Ariel Heath as Sue Collins
- Lorraine Krueger as Ann
- Gladys Blake as Janie
- Charles Judels as Felix Black
- Charles Williams as Louis Horton
- Renee Helms as Polly
- Marcy McGuire as Louise

== Soundtrack ==
- Frances Langford - "That's How the Rumba Began" (By Morey Amsterdam and Tony Romano)
- Frances Langford - "Some Day" (By Morey Amsterdam and Tony Romano)
- Frances Langford - "Blue in Love Again" (Written by Michael Breen and Sam Neuman)
- Frances Langford - "A Dream Came True" (Written by Michael Breen and Sam Neuman)
- Tap danced to by Lorraine Krueger - "Buck Dance" (traditional stop-time tune for tap dance)

== See also ==
- List of American films of 1944
