= Machine Gun Mama =

1944 film by Harold Young

- Original film poster
- Directed by: Harold Young
- Written by: Sam Neuman
- Produced by: Harry D. Edwards (associate producer); Jack Schwarz (producer)
- Starring: See below
- Cinematography: Gus Peterson
- Edited by: Robert O. Crandall
- Distributed by: Producers Releasing Corporation
- Release date: August 18, 1944
- Running time: 61 minutes
- Country: United States
- Languages: English; Spanish

Machine Gun Mama is a 1944 American musical comedy film directed by Harold Young. It was PRC's attempt to feature a comedy team to compete with Universal's Abbott and Costello and Paramount's Road to ... movies, as well as their entry in the Good Neighbor Policy film genre of the time where the United States presented both a positive image to Latin and South America as well as stimulating American tourism to the region. Harold Young had also directed the live action portions of Walt Disney's The Three Caballeros.

The film had the working titles Mexican Fiesta and Moonlight Fiesta but is also known as Tropical Fury as an American TV title of the film. The title comes from a furious Nita turning a compressed air pellet firing machine gun carnival attraction on the Americans.

== Plot ==
Two truck drivers from Brooklyn travel to Mexico to deliver an elephant named "Bunny", but they have lost the address where Bunny is to be delivered. Adopting the elephant as their own, the two stumble into a traveling carnival headed by Alberto Cordoba and his daughter Nita. The carnival is destitute and menaced by loan sharks. The two Americans sell Bunny to the carnival to replace their recently departed flea circus but agree not to accept their payment until the carnival regains its fortune thanks to Bunny and Brooklyn "ballyhoo". The loan sharks attempt a variety of dirty tricks against the gringos.

== Cast ==
- Armida as Nita Cordoba
- El Brendel as Ollie Swenson
- Wallace Ford as John O'Reilly
- Jack La Rue as Jose
- Luis Alberni as Ignacio
- Ariel Heath as The Blonde
- Julian Rivero as Alberto Cordoba
- Eumenio Blanco as First Detective
- Anthony Warde as Carlos

== Soundtrack ==
- "Mi Amor" (written by Sam Neuman and Michael Breen)
- "Moonlight Fiesta" (written by Sam Neuman and Michael Breen)
