= The Enchanted Forest (1945 film) =

1945 film by Lew Landers

- Directed by: Lew Landers
- Screenplay by: Robert Lee Johnson; John Lebar; Lou Brock; Sam Neuman (adaptation); Lou Brock (adaptation)
- Story by: John Lebar
- Produced by: Jack Schwarz
- Starring: Edmund Lowe; Brenda Joyce; William Severn; Harry Davenport
- Cinematography: Marcel Le Picard
- Edited by: Roy V. Livingston
- Music by: Albert Hay Malotte
- Production company: Producers Releasing Corporation
- Distributed by: Producers Releasing Corporation
- Release date: December 8, 1945
- Running time: 78 minutes
- Country: United States
- Language: English

The Enchanted Forest is a 1945 family film starring Edmund Lowe and Brenda Joyce, also featuring Harry Davenport as a hermit who finds and raises a young boy in a forest. The film and story served as the inspiration for a 1998 music composition/recording, "Enchanted Forest" by Loren Connors and Suzanne Langille. It was filmed in Cinecolor and released by Producers Releasing Corporation.

== Plot ==
A hermit, Uncle John, communicates with animals and cares for the forest. He is at odds with a forester who wants to cut down all the trees, and wants any impediments (like Uncle John and the boy) removed.

The child, Jackie, had been washed downstream after a trainwreck in a storm. The mother, Anne, whose father owns the land, is told that the child must be dead, but she cannot quite believe it. When she visits her father, and walks in to the forest, the boy catches sight of her, and she catches a glimpse of him as well. Through a series of interactions, the mother and child are reunited, the forest is saved, and Uncle John is able to stay.

== Cast ==
- Edmund Lowe as Steven Blaine
- Brenda Joyce as Anne
- William Severn as Jackie (Billy Severn)
- Harry Davenport as Old John
- John Litel as Ed Henderson
- Clancy Cooper as Gilson
- Jimmy the Crow as Blackie
- Al Ferguson as Truck Driver (uncredited)

== Color ==
The film was photographed in Cinecolor. The incredible, unexpected success of the film led to several major studios filming their own movies in the process.

== Location ==
The film was shot on locations in Humboldt County, California.
