= Pals of the Range =

1935 film directed by Elmer Clifton

- Directed by: Elmer Clifton
- Written by: Elmer Clifton; George M. Merrick
- Produced by: George M. Merrick
- Starring: Rex Lease; Frances Morris; Yakima Canutt
- Cinematography: Eddie Linden
- Edited by: Carl Himm
- Production company: Weiss Productions
- Distributed by: State Rights; Superior Talking Pictures
- Release date: November 1935 (US)
- Running time: 61 minutes
- Country: United States
- Language: English

Pals of the Range is a 1935 American Western film directed by Elmer Clifton, starring Rex Lease, Frances Morris, and Yakima Canutt.

== Cast ==
- Rex Lease as Steve [Barton]
- Frances Morris (credited as Frances Wright) as Peggy
- Yakima Canutt as Brown
- George Chesebro as Zed
- Robert Whiteford as Joe
- Milburn Morante as Gold Dust
- Joey Ray as Tom
- Tom Forman as Uncle
- Artie Ortego as Rod
- Bill Patton as Stranger
- Art Mix as Dick
