= Wings of Adventure =

1930 film

- Directed by: Richard Thorpe
- Written by: Harry L. Fraser
- Starring: Rex Lease; Armida; Clyde Cook
- Cinematography: Arthur Reeves
- Edited by: Clarence Kolster
- Production company: Tiffany Pictures
- Distributed by: Tiffany Pictures
- Release date: August 1, 1930
- Running time: 53 minutes
- Country: United States
- Language: English

Wings of Adventure is a 1930 American pre-Code action adventure film directed by Richard Thorpe and starring Rex Lease, Armida and Clyde Cook. It was produced and distributed by Tiffany Pictures.

== Cast ==
- Rex Lease as Dave Kent
- Armida as Maria Valdez
- Clyde Cook as Pete 'Skeets' Smith
- Fred Malatesta as Don Ricardo Diaz San Pablo La Pandella ('La Panthera')
- Eddie Boland as Viva
- Charles K. French as U.S. Army Major
- Nick De Ruiz as Manuel - Bandito Leader
- Steve Clemente as Bandit
- Chris-Pin Martin as Lopez

== Bibliography ==
- Fetrow, Alan G. . Sound films, 1927-1939: a United States Filmography. McFarland, 1992.
- Pitts, Michael R. Poverty Row Studios, 1929-1940. McFarland & Company, 2005.
