= Ariel Heath =

American actress (1922–1973)

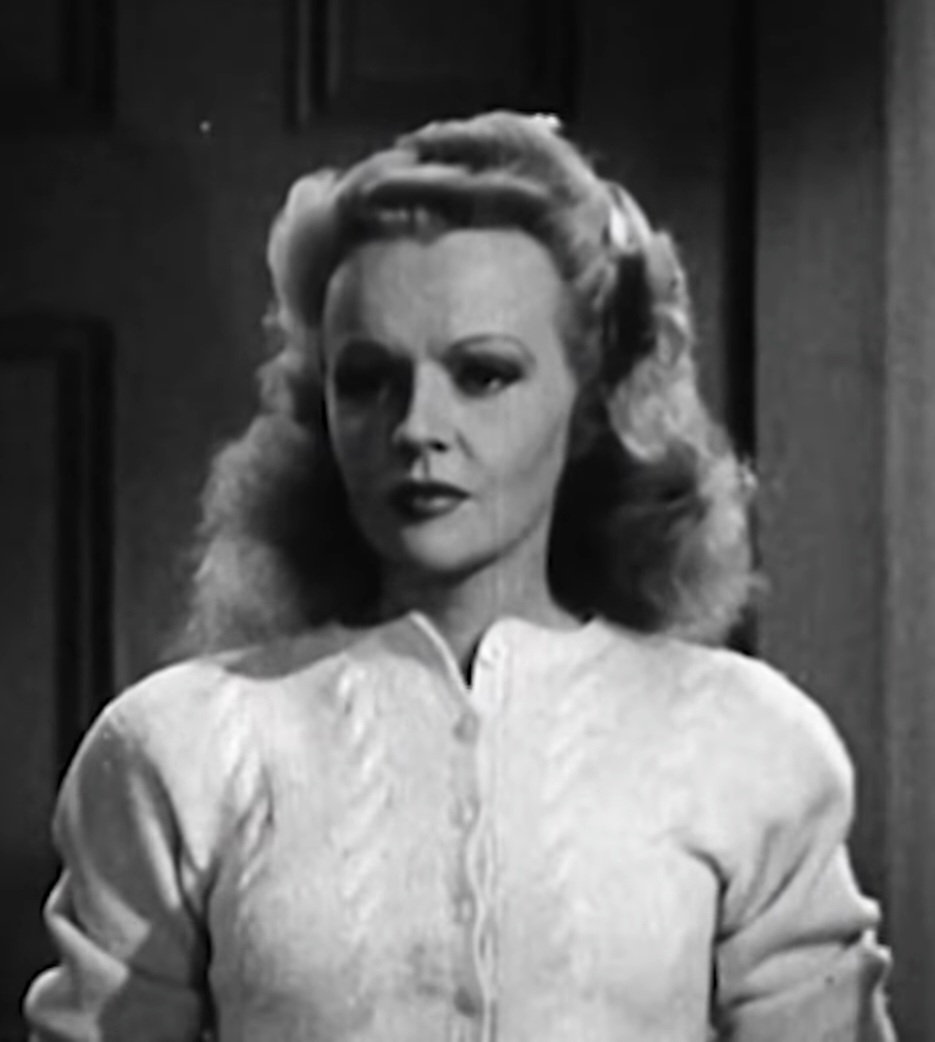
- Heath in Career Girl (1944)
- Born: Ariel Heath Dean; January 1, 1922; Lexington, Kentucky, U.S.
- Died: July 21, 1973 (aged 51); Santa Barbara, California, U.S.
- Occupation: Actress
- Years active: 1942–1945
- Spouse: Shipley Bayliss

Ariel Heath Dean (January 1, 1922 – July 21, 1973) was an American actress. She is best known for appearing in The Leopard Man (1943), The Black Hills Express (1943) and Career Girl (1944).

Heath was born in Lexington, Kentucky. She was married to Shipley Bayliss. She died in July 1973 in Santa Barbara, California, at the age of 51.

== Filmography ==
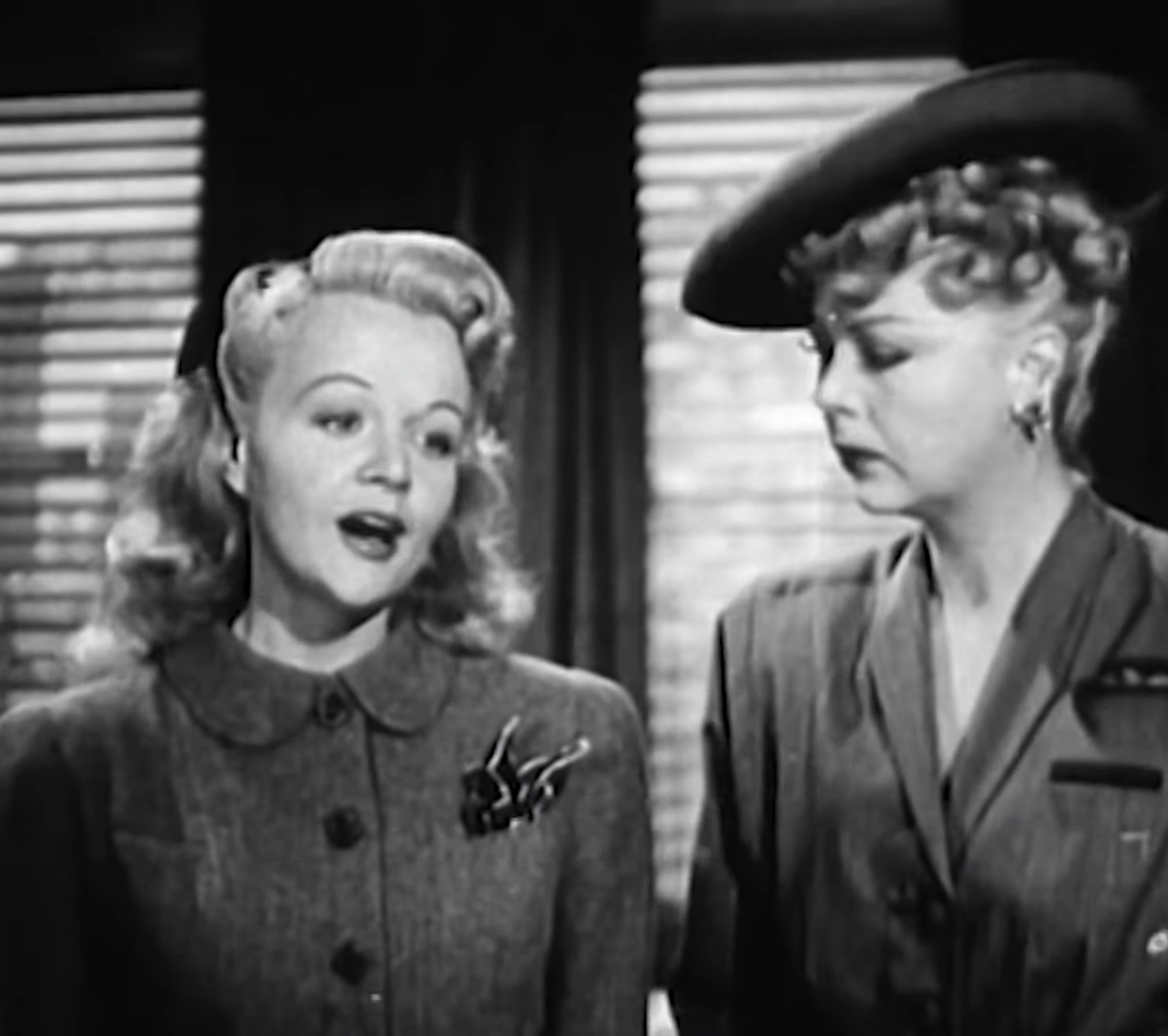
Heath and Iris Adrian in Career Girl (1944)

=== Film ===
Year	Title	Role	Notes
1942	Here We Go Again	Girl Guide	(uncredited)
1942	Seven Days' Leave	Girl	(uncredited)
1943	Hitler's Children	Young Matron	(uncredited)
1943	Flight for Freedom	Telephone Operator	(uncredited)
1943	Ladies' Day	Player's wife	(uncredited)
1943	The Falcon Strikes Back	Hotel Guest	(uncredited)
1943	This Land Is Mine		(undetermined role)
1943	The Leopard Man	Eloise	(uncredited)
1943	Mr. Lucky	Girl	(uncredited)
1943	The Black Hills Express	Gale Southern	
1943	A Lady Takes a Chance	Flossie	
1944	Career Girl	Sue Collins	
1944	Machine Gun Mama	The Blonde	
1945	The Big Show-Off	Goldie	(uncredited)
