= Frances Morris (actress) =

American actress

- Frances Morris as Sarah Kent in the Adventures of Superman episode "Superman on Earth", 1952
- Born: August 3, 1908; Springfield, Massachusetts, US
- Died: December 2, 2003 (aged 95); Santa Clarita, California, US

Frances Morris (August 3, 1908 – December 2, 2003) was an American actress.

On Broadway, Morris appeared in The Passing Show of 1912 (1912) and Step This Way (1916). Her films included Thunder (1929) and Portrait of a Mobster (1961).

Born in 1908 in Springfield, Massachusetts, she died in Santa Clarita, California, in 2003.

== Selected filmography ==
- Thunder (1929) - Molly
- The Ridin' Fool (1931) - Sally Warren
- Ladies of the Big House (1931) - Juror (uncredited)
- Guns for Hire (1932) - Polly Clark
- Afraid to Talk (1932) - Miss Sheridan, Nurse (uncredited)
- Trailing North (1933) - Girl at 1st Outpost
- Pilgrimage (1933) - Nurse (uncredited)
- Manhattan Love Song (1934) - Chorus Girl (uncredited)
- Hollywood Mystery (1934) - Daisy - Dan's Secretary (uncredited)
- Two Heads on a Pillow (1934) - Receptionist (uncredited)
- Against the Law (1934) - Nurse (uncredited)
- The Boss Cowboy (1934) - Mary Ross
- Pals of the Range (1935) - Peggy Dawson
- I've Been Around (1935)
- Pals of the Range (1935)
- Dance Charlie Dance (1937) - First Telegraph Girl (uncredited)
- Missing Witnesses (1937) - Whitey's Secretary (uncredited)
- Hollywood Hotel (1937) - Casting Assistant (uncredited)
- Our Leading Citizen (1939) - Maid
- Florian (1940) - Office Girl (uncredited)
- Private Affairs (1940) - Secretary (uncredited)
- Manhattan Heartbeat (1940) - Tired Girl (uncredited)
- The Leather Pushers (1940) - Nurse (uncredited)
- Sandy Gets Her Man (1940) - Secretary (uncredited)
- Sky Raiders (1941, Serial) - Substitute Secretary [Chs. 6-7] (uncredited)
- No Greater Sin (1941) - Jarvis' Secretary (uncredited)
- I'll Sell My Life (1941) - Annie Winterbottom
- Never Give a Sucker an Even Break (1941) - Nurse (uncredited)
- Always Tomorrow: The Portrait of an American Business (1941) - Little Girl's Mother (uncredited)
- A Tragedy at Midnight (1942) - Hospital Desk Nurse (uncredited)
- Duffy's Tavern (1945) - Woman Who Screams (uncredited)
- The Razor's Edge (1946) - Nurse (uncredited)
- California (1947) - Mrs. Smith (uncredited)
- The Unfaithful (1947) - Agnes
- The Big Clock (1948)
- This Side of the Law (1950) - Miss Roberts
- Adventures of Superman (1952) (Season 1 Episode 1: "Superman on Earth") - Sarah Kent, Superman's foster mother
- The Captive City (1952) - Mrs. Harding
- My Son John (1952) - Secretary (scenes deleted)
- Paula (1952) - Miss Turner, Teacher (uncredited)
- Carrie (1952) - Maid (uncredited)
- The Miracle of Our Lady of Fatima (1952) - Olímpia Marto
- Because of You (1952) - Mrs. Colman (uncredited)
- Never Wave at a WAC (1953) - Major Cartwright (uncredited)
- Miss Sadie Thompson (1953) - Mrs. MacPhail
- Women's Prison (1955) - Miss Whittier (uncredited)
- The Night of the Hunter (1955) - Bart's wife (uncredited)
- Bobby Ware Is Missing (1955) - Sophie, Housekeeper (uncredited)
- The Price of Fear (1956) - Mrs. Weems (uncredited)
- Crime Against Joe (1956) - Nora Manning
- The Naked Hills (1956) - Woman in Store (uncredited)
- Gun for a Coward (1956) - Mrs. Anderson
- Fury at Showdown (1957) - Mrs. Williams
- Monkey on My Back (1957) - Landlady (uncredited)
- Wild Is the Wind (1957) - Party Guest #4
- Onionhead (1958) - Arlene Pierce (uncredited)
- Portrait of a Mobster (1961) - Louise Murphy
- Alfred Hitchcock Presents (1962) (Season 7 Episode 37: "The Big Kick") - Landlady
- Ichabod and Me (1962) (Season 1 Episode 25: "The Celebrity") - The Housekeeper
- The Virginian (1963) (Season 1 Episode 20: "If You Have Tears") - Mrs. Hafenkamp
- The Alfred Hitchcock Hour (1964) (Season 2 Episode 15: "Night Caller") - Woman Shopper
- The Virginian (1964) (Season 2 Episode 23: "The Intruders") - Mrs. Wingate
- The Virginian (1964) (Season 3 Episode 8: "A Father for Toby") - Landlady
