= Son of the Renegade =

1953 film by Reg Browne

- DVD Cover for the film
- Directed by: Reg Browne
- Written by: Johnny Carpenter (screenplay and story); Ed Wood (co-writer, uncredited)
- Produced by: Johnny Carpenter (producer); Maurice Kosloff (executive producer); Jack Schwarz (producer) (executive producer)
- Starring: Johnny Carpenter
- Cinematography: William C. Thompson
- Edited by: B. Richard Connors
- Music by: Darrell Calker
- Release date: 27 March 1953
- Running time: 57 minutes
- Country: United States
- Language: English
- Budget: $17,500

Son of the Renegade is a 1953 low-budget American Western film directed by Reg Browne. The film's soundtrack was conducted by Darrell Calker. The film also features uncredited co-screenwriting from b-movie director Ed Wood.

== Plot summary ==
Red River Johnny gathers his friends (most of whom are called some variation of the name Bill) and returns to claim the heritage of his father who was outlawed many years ago by the sheriff of Red River. The present Sheriff Masters, son of the man Johnny's father shot, is his enemy. Three-Finger Jack stages a series of robberies and stage coach holdups, for which he frames Red River Johnny. The latter learns that Three-Finger plans to rob the town bank, and gathers his men and wipes out Three-Finger and his gang.

== Cast ==
- Johnny Carpenter as Red River Johnny (both Sr. and Jr.)
- Lori Irving as Lori Masters
- Joan McKellen as Valley, the vamp
- Valley Keene as Dusty, Indian girl
- Jack Ingram as Three-Finger Jack
- Vern Teters as Sheriff Bat Masters Jr.
- Bill Coontz as Billy the Outlaw (sometimes called Wild Bill)
- Ted Smile as Cherokee Jr., sidekick
- Bill Ward as Baby-Face Bill
- Roy Canada as Canada, lanky sidekick
- Whitey Hughes as The Long-Haired Kid
- Lennie Smith as Young Deputy
- Ewing Miles Brown as Wild Bill
- Fred Carson as Big Fred
- Percy Lennon as The Australian Kid
- Jack Wilson as The Texas Kid
- Bill Chaney as Bill Chaney, short-bearded sidekick
- Pat McGeehan as Narrator (voice)
- Frank Ellis as Bat Master Sr., outlaw
