= The Black Hills Express =

1943 film by John English

Black Hills Express
- Directed by: John English
- Written by: Norman S. Hall; Fred Myton
- Produced by: Edward J. White
- Starring: Don 'Red' Barry; Wally Vernon; Ariel Heath
- Cinematography: Ernest Miller
- Edited by: Harry Keller
- Music by: Mort Glickman
- Production company: Republic Pictures
- Distributed by: Republic Pictures
- Release date: August 15, 1943
- Running time: 56 minutes
- Country: United States
- Language: English

Black Hills Express is a 1943 American Western film directed by John English and starring Don 'Red' Barry, Wally Vernon and Ariel Heath.

The film's art direction was by Russell Kimball.

== Cast ==
- Don 'Red' Barry as Lon Walker
- Wally Vernon as Deputy Deadeye
- Ariel Heath as Gale Southern
- George J. Lewis as Henchman Vic Fowler
- William Halligan as Marshal Harvey Dorman
- Hooper Atchley as Jason Phelps
- Charles Miller as Raymond Harper
- Pierce Lyden as Henchman Carl
- Jack Rockwell as Sheriff
- Bob Kortman as Henchman Dutch
- Al Taylor as Henchman Denver aka Stoner

== Bibliography ==
- Len D. Martin. The Republic Pictures Checklist: Features, Serials, Cartoons, Short Subjects and Training Films of Republic Pictures Corporation, 1935-1959. McFarland, 1998.
