= Yakima Canutt =

American rodeo rider, stuntman, actor (1895–1986)

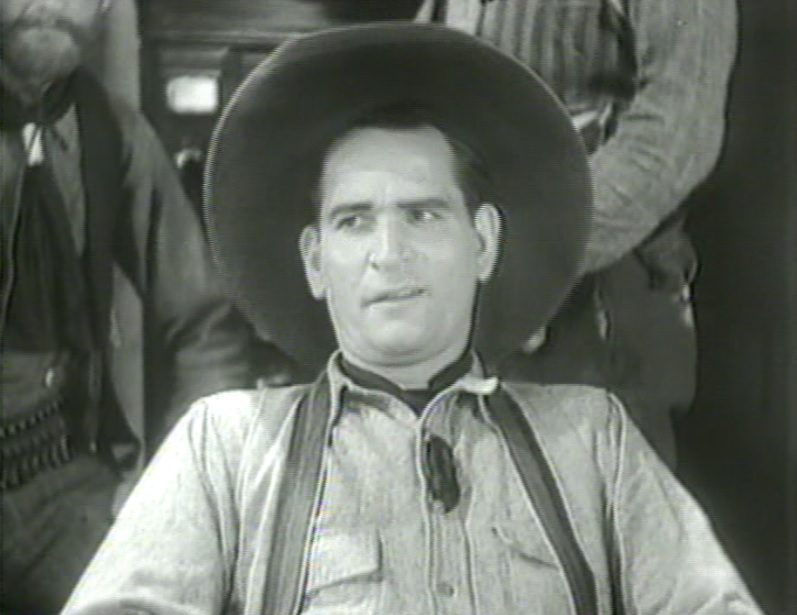
- Canutt in The Man from Utah (1934)
- Born: Enos Edward Canutt; November 29, 1895; Colfax, Washington, U.S.
- Died: May 24, 1986 (aged 90); Los Angeles, California, U.S.
- Resting place: Valhalla Memorial Park Cemetery
- Other name: Yak Canutt
- Occupations: Rodeo rider; actor; stuntman; director
- Years active: 1912–1975
- Spouses: Catherine "Kitty" Wilks (m. 1917; div. 1922) Minnie Audrea Yeager Rice (m. 1931)
- Children: 3

Enos Edward "Yakima" Canutt (November 29, 1895 – May 24, 1986) was an American rodeo rider, stuntman, and actor. Sometimes called "the King of the Stuntmen," he is considered one of the influential figures in the history of motion picture stuntcraft.

Canutt worked on more than 200 films between 1915 and 1975, developing numerous stunt techniques and technologies that later became ubiquitous. He received an Academy Honorary Award in 1967. His oft-collaborator, director William Witney, said "there will probably never be another stuntman who can compare to Yakima Canutt."

== Early years ==
Yakima was born Enos Edward Canutt in the Snake River Hills near Colfax, Washington, one of five children of John Lemuel Canutt, a rancher, and his wife Nettie Ellen Stevens. He grew up in eastern Washington on a ranch near Penawawa Creek, founded by his grandfather. His father operated the ranch and also served a term in the state legislature.

Canutt's formal education was limited to elementary school in Green Lake, then a suburb of Seattle. He gained the education for his life's work on the family ranch, where he learned to hunt, trap, shoot, and ride.

Canutt first broke a wild bronco when he was 11. As a 6-foot-tall (1.8 m) 16-year-old, he started bronco riding at the Whitman County Fair in Colfax in 1912, and at 17 he won the title of World's Best Bronco Buster. Canutt started rodeo riding professionally and gained a reputation as a bronc rider, bulldogger, and all-around cowboy. It was at the 1914 Pendleton Round-Up that he got the nickname "Yakima" when a newspaper caption misidentified him. Other sources claim he adopted the nickname from the Yakima River Valley in Washington. "Yakima Canutt may be the most famous person NOT from Yakima, Washington" says Elizabeth Gibson, author of Yakima, Washington.

Winning second place at the 1915 Pendleton Round-Up brought attention from show promoters, who invited Canutt to compete around the country.

"I started in major rodeos in 1914, and went through to 1923. There was quite a crop of us traveling together, and we would have special railroad cars and cars for the horses. We'd play anywhere from three, six, eight, ten-day shows. Bronc riding and bulldogging were my specialties, but I did some roping," said Canutt.

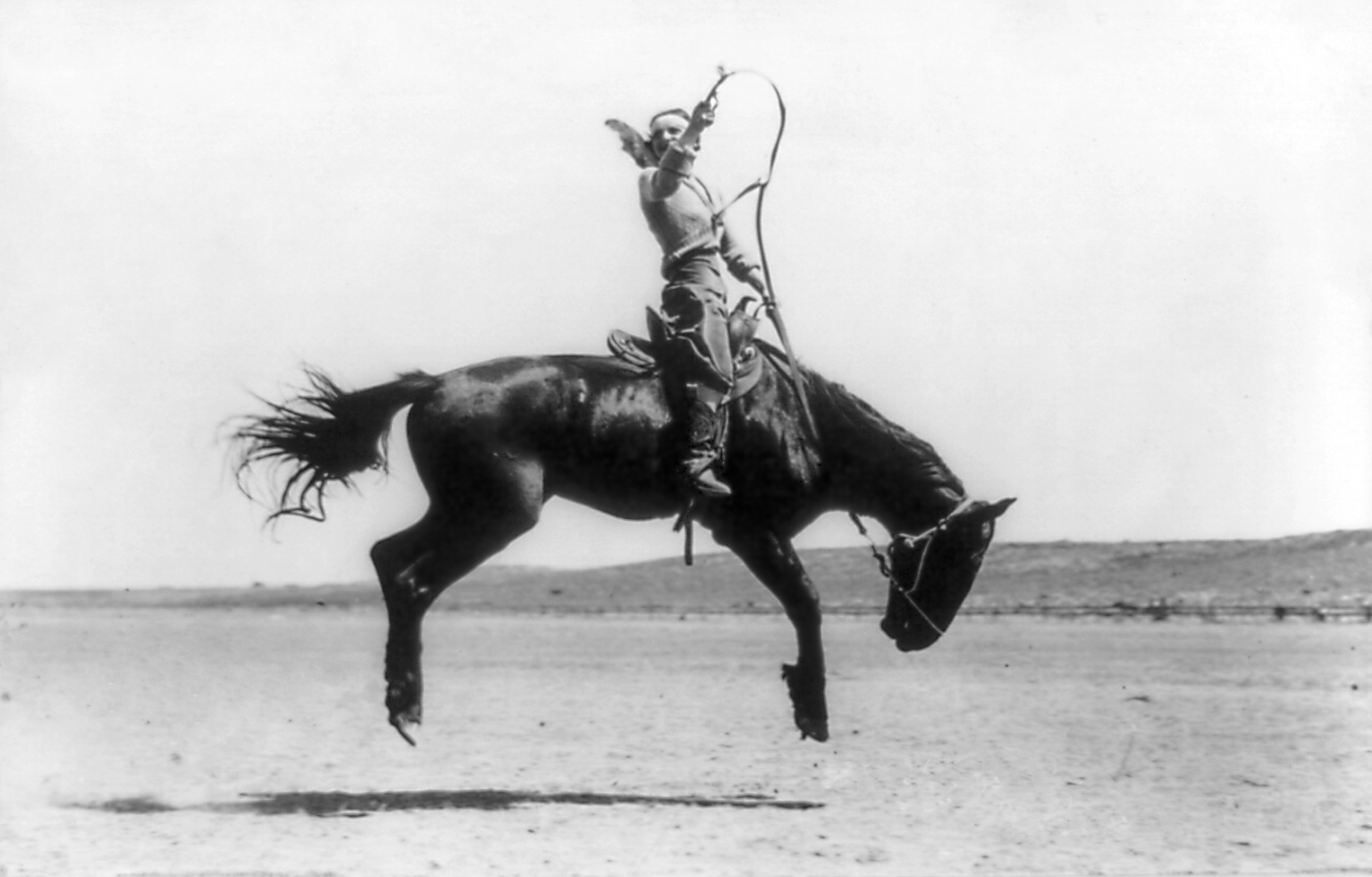
Kitty Canutt, champion lady rider of the world, on Winnemucca, 1919

During the 1916 season, he became interested in divorcee Kitty Wilks, who had won the Lady's Bronc-Riding Championship a couple of times. They married on July 20, 1917, while at a show in Kalispell, Montana; he was 21 and she 18. They divorced in 1922. While bulldogging in Idaho, Canutt suffered tears to his mouth and upper lip by a bull's horn; after getting stitches, he returned to the competition. A plastic surgeon corrected the injury a year later.

== Career ==
=== Rodeo ===
Canutt won his first world championship at the Olympics of the West in 1917 and won more championships in the next few years. In between rodeos, he broke horses for the French government in World War I. In 1918, he went to Spokane to enlist in the United States Navy and was stationed in Bremerton. In the fall, he was given a 30-day furlough to defend his rodeo title. He was discharged in spring 1919. At the 1919 Calgary Stampede, he competed in the bucking event and met Pete Knight.

He traveled to Los Angeles for a rodeo, and decided to winter in Hollywood, where he met screen personalities. Tom Mix, who had also started in rodeos, invited him to be in two of his pictures. Mix added to his flashy wardrobe by borrowing two of Canutt's two-tone shirts and having his tailor make 40 copies. Canutt got his first taste of stunt work in a fight scene on a serial called Lightning Bryce; he left Hollywood to compete in the 1920 rodeo circuit.

Canutt won the saddle-bronc competition at the Pendleton Round-Up in 1917, 1919, and 1923 and came second in 1915 and 1929. He won the steer bulldogging in 1920 and 1921, and won the All-Around Police Gazette belt in 1917, 1919, 1920 and 1923. While in Hollywood in 1923 for an awards ceremony, he was offered eight Western action pictures for producer Ben Wilson at Burwillow Studios; the first was to be Riding Mad. He won the first leg of the Roosevelt Trophy as the cowboy who accumulated the most points between Cheyenne Frontier Days and the Pendleton Round-Up. After he won three years in a row at the Fort Worth Rodeo in Fort Worth, Texas, it came to be known as "Yak's show."

=== Acting ===
Canutt had been perfecting tricks such as the Crupper Mount, a leapfrog over the horse's rump into the saddle. Douglas Fairbanks used some in his film The Gaucho. Fairbanks and Canutt became friends and competed regularly at Fairbanks's gym. Canutt took small parts in pictures to get experience. It was in Branded a Bandit (1924) that his nose was broken in a 12-foot fall from a cliff. The picture was delayed several weeks, and when it resumed, Canutt's close shots were from the side. A plastic surgeon reset the nose, which healed, inspiring Canutt to remark that he thought it looked better.

=== Stuntwork ===
Yakima in John Ford's Stagecoach (1939) after doing the "transfer" part of his most famous stunt

When his contract with Wilson expired in 1927, Canutt made appearances at rodeos across the country. By 1928, the talkies were coming out, and though he had been in 48 silent pictures, Canutt knew his career was in trouble. His voice had been damaged from flu in the Navy. He started taking on bit parts and stunts, and realized more could be done with action in pictures.

In 1930, between pictures and rodeoing, Canutt met Minnie Audrea Yeager Rice at a party at her parents' home. They kept company during the next year while he picked up work on the serials for Mascot Pictures Corporation. They married on November 12, 1931, and had three children together. Two sons followed their father into stunt work.

When rodeo riders invaded Hollywood, they brought a battery of rodeo techniques that Canutt would expand and improve, including horse falls and wagon wrecks. He also developed the harnesses and cable rigs to make the stunts foolproof and safe. Among the new safety devices was the 'L' stirrup, which released a rider's foot if he was performing falling off a horse, so that he did not get hung in the stirrup. Canutt also developed cabling and equipment to cause spectacular wagon crashes, while releasing the team of horses, all on the same spot every time. Safety methods such as these saved film-makers time and money and prevented accidents and injury to performers and animals.

Canutt developed the 'Running W' stunt, bringing down a horse at the gallop by attaching a wire, anchored to the ground, to its fetlocks and launching the rider forward spectacularly. This often killed or severely injured the horse, requiring it to be put down. At a minimum it was badly shaken and unusable for the rest of the day. The 'Running W' is now banned and has been replaced with training for the falling-horse technique.

It is believed that the last time the Running W was used was on the 1983 Iraqi film Clash of Loyalties, when British actor and friend Marc Sinden and stuntman Ken Buckle (who had been trained by Canutt) performed the stunt three times during a cavalry charge sequence.

While working on Mascot serials, Canutt practiced and perfected his most famous stunts, including the drop from a stagecoach that he performed in John Ford's Stagecoach (1939). That stunt was filmed on Lucerne Dry Lake, north of Lucerne Valley, California. He first performed it in Riders of the Dawn (1937) while doubling for Jack Randall.

In his 1981 film Raiders of the Lost Ark, Steven Spielberg paid homage to Canutt, recreating the stunt when stuntman Terry Leonard (doubling for Harrison Ford) 'dropped' from the front of a German transport truck, was dragged underneath (along a prepared trench), and climbed up the back and round to the front again.

Yakima in John Ford's Stagecoach doing the "drop" part of his most famous stunt

==== John Wayne ====
While at Mascot, Canutt met John Wayne while doubling for him in a motorcycle stunt for The Shadow of the Eagle (1932). Wayne admired Canutt's agility and fearlessness, and Canutt respected Wayne's willingness to learn and attempt his own stunts. Canutt taught Wayne how to fall off a horse.

The two worked together to create a technique that made on-screen fight scenes more realistic. Wayne and Canutt found if they stood at a certain angle in front of the camera, they could throw a punch at an actor's face and make it look as if actual contact had been made.

Canutt and Wayne pioneered stunt and screen fighting techniques still in use. Wayne copied much of his on-screen persona from Canutt. The characterizations associated with Wayne – the drawling, hesitant speech and the hip-rolling walk – were pure Canutt. Said Wayne, "I spent weeks studying the way Yakima Canutt walked and talked. He was a real cowhand." In 1934, the two appeared together in the Western Randy Rides Alone, in which Wayne starred and Canutt appeared as "henchman Spike".

In 1932, Canutt's first son Edward Clay was born and nicknamed Tap, short for Tapadero, a Spanish word for a stirrup covering. That year Canutt broke his shoulder in four places while trying to transfer from horse to wagon team. Though work was scarce during the Depression, he got by combining stunting and rodeo work.

In 1934, Herbert J. Yates of Consolidated Film Industries combined Monogram, Mascot, Liberty, Majestic, Chesterfield, and Invincible Pictures to form Republic Pictures. Canutt became Republic's top stuntman. He handled all the action on many pictures, including Gene Autry films; and several series and serials, such as The Lone Ranger and Zorro. For Zorro Rides Again, Canutt performed almost all the scenes in which Zorro wore a mask. As a result, he was on the screen as much as the star John Carroll. When the action was indicated in a Republic script, it said "see Yakima Canutt for action sequences."

William Witney, one of Republic's film directors, said:

There will probably never be another stuntman who can compare to Yakima Canutt. He had been a world champion cowboy several times and where horses were concerned he could do it all. He invented all the gadgets that made stunt work easier. One of his clever devices was a step that attached to the saddle so that he had leverage to transfer to another moving object, like a wagon or a train. Another was the "shotgun," a spring-loaded device used to separate the tongue of a running wagon from the horses, thus cutting the horses loose. It also included a shock cord attached to the wagon bed, which caused wheels to cramp and turn the wagon over on the precise spot that was most advantageous for the camera.

In the 1936 film San Francisco, Canutt replaced Clark Gable in a scene in which a wall was to fall on the star. Canutt said: "We had a heavy table situated so that I could dive under it at the last moment. Just as the wall started down, a girl in the scene became hysterical and panicked. I grabbed her, leaped for the table, but didn't quite make it." The girl was unhurt but he broke six ribs.

==== Ramrod ====
Yakima doubling John Wayne in Stagecoach

Canutt tried to get into directing; he was growing older and knew his stunting days were numbered. Harry Joe, Canutt's second son, was born in January 1937. Brothers Joe and Tap later got work as stuntmen with their father.

In 1938, Republic Pictures started expanding into bigger pictures and budgets. Canutt's mentor and action director for the 1925 Ben-Hur, Breezy Eason, was hired as second unit director and Canutt to coordinate and ramrod the stunts. For Canutt, this meant not only hiring stuntmen and doing some stunts himself but also laying out the action for the director and writing additional stunts. According to author Garrett Soden:

In the five years between 1925 and 1930, 55 people were killed making movies, and more than 10,000 injured. By the late 1930s, the maverick stuntman willing to do anything for a buck was disappearing. Now under scrutiny, experienced stunt men began to separate themselves from amateurs by building special equipment, rehearsing stunts, and developing new techniques.

— from Falling: How Our Greatest Fear Became Our Greatest Thrill by Garrett Soden.

John Ford hired Canutt on John Wayne's recommendation for Stagecoach, where Canutt supervised the river-crossing scene as well as the Indian chase scene, did the stagecoach drop, and doubled for Wayne in the coach stunts. For safety during the stagecoach drop stunt, Canutt devised modified yokes and tongues to give extra handholds and extra room between the teams. Ford told him that whenever Ford made an action picture and Canutt was not working elsewhere, he was on Ford's payroll. Also in 1939, Canutt doubled Clark Gable in the burning of Atlanta in Gone With the Wind. He also appeared as a renegade accosting Scarlett O'Hara (Vivien Leigh) as she crosses a bridge in a carriage driving through a shantytown.

=== Directing ===
In 1940, Canutt sustained serious internal injuries while doubling for Clark Gable in Boom Town (1940) when a horse fell on him. Though in discomfort for months after an operation to repair his bifurcated intestines, he continued to work. Republic's Sol Siegel offered him the chance to direct the action sequences of Dark Command, starring Wayne and directed by Raoul Walsh. For Dark Command, Canutt fashioned an elaborate cable system to yank back the plummeting coach before it fell on the stuntman and horses; he also created a breakaway harness from which they were released before hitting the water.

In 1943, while doing a low budget Roy Rogers picture called Idaho, Canutt broke both his legs at the ankles in a fall off a wagon. He recovered to write the stunts and supervise the action for another Wayne film, In Old Oklahoma. In the next decade, Canutt became one of the best second unit and action directors. MGM brought Canutt to England in 1952 to direct the action and jousting sequences in Ivanhoe with Robert Taylor. This would set a precedent by filming action abroad instead of on the studio lot. Canutt introduced many British stuntmen to Hollywood-style stunt training. Ivanhoe was followed by Knights of the Round Table, again with director Richard Thorpe and starring Robert Taylor. Canutt again was brought in for lavish action scenes in King Richard and the Crusaders.

In 1954, Canutt directed the Hollywood Western movie The Lawless Rider, starring Johnny Carpenter and Texas Rose Bascom.

Canutt directed the close-action scenes for Stanley Kubrick's Spartacus (1960). He took five days to direct retakes that included the slave army rolling its flaming logs into the Romans and other fight scenes featuring Kirk Douglas, Tony Curtis and John Ireland.

==== Ben Hur ====
For Ben-Hur (1959), Canutt staged the chariot race with nine teams of four horses. He trained Charlton Heston and Stephen Boyd to do their own charioteering. He and his crew spent five months on the race sequence. In contrast to the 1925 film, not one horse was hurt, and no humans experienced serious injuries. His son Joe Canutt, while doubling for Charlton Heston, cut his chin because he did not follow his father's advice to hook himself to the chariot when Judah Ben-Hur's chariot bounced over the wreck of another chariot.

==== Other films ====
Walt Disney brought Canutt in to do second unit work for Westward Ho, the Wagons! in 1956. He followed this first live action Western feature film with Old Yeller the next year. In 1960, Canutt worked with Disney on Swiss Family Robinson, which involved transporting many exotic animals to a remote island in the West Indies.

Anthony Mann specifically requested Canutt for the second unit for his El Cid (1961), where Canutt directed sons Joe and Tap, doubling for Charlton Heston and Christopher Rhodes, in a stunning tournament joust. "Canutt was surely the most active stager of tournaments since the Middle Ages" – from Swordsmen of the Screen. He was determined to make the combat scenes in El Cid the best that had been filmed. Mann again requested him for The Fall of the Roman Empire (1964). Over the next 10 years, Canutt continued to work, bringing his talents to Cat Ballou, Khartoum, Where Eagles Dare and A Man Called Horse (1970).

In 1985, Yakima appeared as himself in Yak's Best Ride, directed by John Crawford. His final screen credit was as a consultant for the stunts in Equus.

== Death ==
On May 24, 1986, Yakima Canutt died of cardiac arrest at the age of 90 at the North Hollywood Medical Center in North Hollywood, California. He was cremated and his ashes were scattered in the Garden of Remembrance at the Valhalla Memorial Park Cemetery. Canutt has a memorial plaque in the cemetery's Portal of Folded Wings.

== Legacy and honors ==
For his contribution to the motion picture industry, Canutt awarded a star on the Hollywood Walk of Fame at 1500 Vine Street in 1985.

His honors include:

- 1967 Academy Honorary Award for achievements as a stuntman and for "developing safety devices to protect all stunt men everywhere".
- 1969 Pendleton Round-Up and Happy Canyon Hall of Fame
- 1975 National Cowboy and Western Heritage Museum Rodeo Hall of Fame
- Stuntmen's Hall of Fame
- 2001 Texas Trail of Fame

Other film awards

- 1959 – National Board of Review of Motion Pictures Special Citation shared with Andrew Marton for directing the chariot race in Ben-Hur
- 1978 – Academy of Motion Picture Arts and Sciences "A tribute to Yakima Canutt" dinner
- 1984 – The Motion Picture & Television Fund's Golden Boot Award

== Filmography ==
=== Selected filmography ===
- Lightning Bryce (1919) as the Deputy
- The Desert Hawk (1924)
- The Riddle Rider (1924)
- Branded a Bandit (1924)
- Romance and Rustlers (1925)
- A Two-Fisted Sheriff (1925)
- The Riding Comet (1925)
- White Thunder (1925)
- Scar Hanan (1925)
- The Human Tornado (1925)
- Wild Horse Canyon (1925)
- The Devil Horse (1926)
- The Fighting Stallion (1927)
- Bad Men's Money (1929)
- The Three Outcasts (1929)
- Riders of the Storm (1929)
- Firebrand Jordan (1930)
- Westward Bound (1930)
- Ridin' Law (1930) as Buck Lambert
- The Hurricane Horseman (1931)
- The Shadow of the Eagle (1932) as Boyle
- Battling Buckaroo (1932)
- Guns for Hire (1932)
- The Wyoming Whirlwind (1932)
- The Texas Tornado (1932) as Jackson – Henchman
- The Telegraph Trail (1933) as High Wolf
- Scarlet River (1933) as Yak
- Sagebrush Trail (1933) as outlaw band leader
- West of the Divide (1934) as Hank
- The Man from Hell (1934)
- Fighting Through (1934) as Big Jack Thorne
- The Man from Utah (1934) as Cheyenne Kent
- Randy Rides Alone (1934) as Henchman Spike
- The Star Packer (1934) as Yak
- The Lawless Frontier (1934) as Bad Man
- 'Neath the Arizona Skies (1934) as Bad Man
- The Dawn Rider (1935) as Saloon Owner
- Lawless Range (1935) as Joe Burns
- Outlaw Rule (1935) as Blaze Tremaine
- Paradise Canyon (1935) as Curly Joe Gale
- Pals of the Range (1935) as Brown
- Cyclone of the Saddle (1935) as Snake
- The Clutching Hand (1936)
- Wildcat Trooper (1936)
- Riders of the Rockies (1937)
- Stagecoach (1939) second unit director, stunt coordinator, and stunts/Cavalry scout, all uncredited
- Gone with the Wind (1939) as man who attacks Scarlett while riding through shanty town; also uncredited stunt coordinator/stunt double for Clark Gable
- Angel and the Badman (1947) second unit director
- Ivanhoe (1952) second unit director
- Knights of the Round Table (1953) second unit director, uncredited
- The Lawless Rider (1954) director
- King Richard and the Crusaders (1954) second unit director
- Old Yeller (1957) second unit director
- Ben-Hur (1959) second unit director
- Swiss Family Robinson (1960) second unit director
- El Cid (1961) second unit director
- The Fall of the Roman Empire (1964) second unit director
- Cat Ballou (1965) second unit director; executive in charge of production; uncredited stunt coordinator
- Khartoum (1966) second unit director
- The Flim-Flam Man (1967) second unit director
- Where Eagles Dare (1968) second unit director
- A Man Called Horse (1970) second unit director
- Rio Lobo (1970) second unit director
- Breakheart Pass (1975) second unit director
