= Fury at Furnace Creek =

1948 film by H. Bruce Humberstone

- Theatrical release poster
- Directed by: H. Bruce Humberstone
- Written by: Charles G. Booth; Winston Miller
- Story by: David Garth
- Produced by: Fred Kohlmar
- Starring: Victor Mature; Coleen Gray; Glenn Langan; Reginald Gardiner
- Cinematography: Harry Jackson
- Edited by: Robert L. Simpson
- Music by: David Raksin
- Production company: 20th Century-Fox
- Distributed by: 20th Century-Fox
- Release date: April 30, 1948
- Running time: 88 minutes
- Country: United States
- Language: English

Fury at Furnace Creek is a 1948 American Western film directed by H. Bruce Humberstone and starring Victor Mature, Coleen Gray, Glenn Langan, and Reginald Gardiner.

== Plot ==
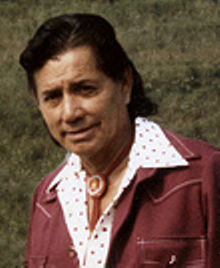
Jay Silverheels as Little Dog

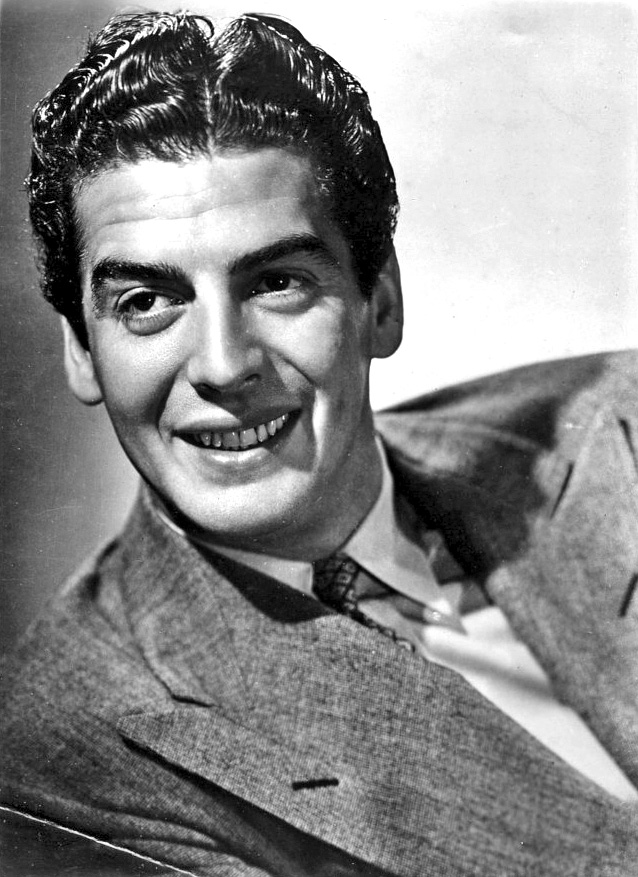
Victor Mature as Cash Blackwell

In 1880, somewhere in the American Southwest, silver deposits were discovered on land belonging to the Apache nation. A mining syndicate led by a man named Leverett wants to engineer an incident that will lead to the forced removal of the Apaches by the US Government. He hires Apache mercenaries from Little Dog, the local chief, to hide in wagons being escorted by the US Army Cavalry to Fort Furnace Creek. The commander of the Army detachment, Captain Walsh, is in on the plot.

On the appointed day, Walsh is escorting the wagons to the fort. Before they arrive, he orders his troop to leave the wagons, claiming it is on orders from General Fletcher Blackwell. When the wagons reach the fort, the mercenaries jump out, massacre the garrison and burn the fort. Blaming the Apaches for the attack, the government forces them out of the region. The area is opened to settlement by European immigrants. The Army convenes a court martial for Blackwell, blaming him for pulling out the cavalry escort. During the proceedings, it is revealed that a mining syndicate began silver mining the day after the territory was opened. The implication was that the syndicate had bribed him. Vigorously denying the allegations on the witness stand, Blackwell suffers a stroke and dies. Blackwell's son Rufe, an Army captain at the West Point Military Academy, refuses to believe his father was guilty.

A short time after Blackwell's death, his second son Cash, a gambler, is released from jail in Kansas City, Missouri. After learning about his father's court martial and death, he vows to clear his father's name Cash travels to Furnace Creek to find Walsh. Once there, he makes friends with Peaceful Jones, a local drunkard. Cash then enters a saloon run by Leverett, where finally locates Walsh, now retired from the Army. Introducing himself under an alias, he saves Walsh from a cheating accusation in a poker game.

Impressed by Cash's physical prowess, Leverett hires him as a bodyguard. During a visit to the ruins of Fort Furnace Creek, Cash meets Molly Baxter; she is tending the grave of her father, who died in the massacre. As they ride back to town, Molly, unaware of Cash's identity, tells him that she thinks Blackwell sold out his men. Back in In Furnace Creek, Leverett announces that the 6th Cavalry is returning to supervise the territory. Little Dog now believes that Leverett scammed him. At the same time, Walsh is desperate to leave Furnace Creek as he believes Leverett wants him dead.

Rufe then arrives in Furnace Creek. When Cash sees him checking into the hotel under an alias, he tells Rufe that he has hopes of getting Walsh to talk. Later, at Molly's café, Peaceful tells her that Cash is working for the syndicate, prompting her to end their friendship.

A former soldier identifies Rufe to Leverett; he assigns Cash to watch him. One of Leverett's henchmen kills Walsh as he is writing his confession in Molly's café. Rufe finds the confession in Walsh's hand; it proves that Walsh and Leverett were the masterminds of the Fort Furnace Creek massacre. After Cash tells Rufe that Leverett's men will be looking for him, he knocks him out and pockets Walsh's confession.

Leverett has Rufe arrested for Walsh's murder. Molly wants to testify at Rufe's trial that she saw Walsh writing a confession. At this point, she has guessed the Cash is Rufe's brother. Cash asks her not to testify, but she is adamant about doing it. Suddenly, with the help of Peaceful and Cash, Rufe escapes from the courtroom; the two brothers ride out of town. Leverett and his henchmen pursue them. and his gang. While Cash acts as a decoy, Rufe rides to another town to show the confession to the federal marshal. During the chase, Cash's horse goes down and he is shot in the thigh. He manages to run to the ruins of the fort. When Leverett arrives at the fort, Cash finally reveals his true identity to him. Leverett is ready to kill Cash when Little Dog shoots him to death.

Weeks later, Cash is recovering from his wound in bed when Molly brings him a newspaper. it has a front page story proclaiming that the War Department has exonerated his father.

== Cast ==
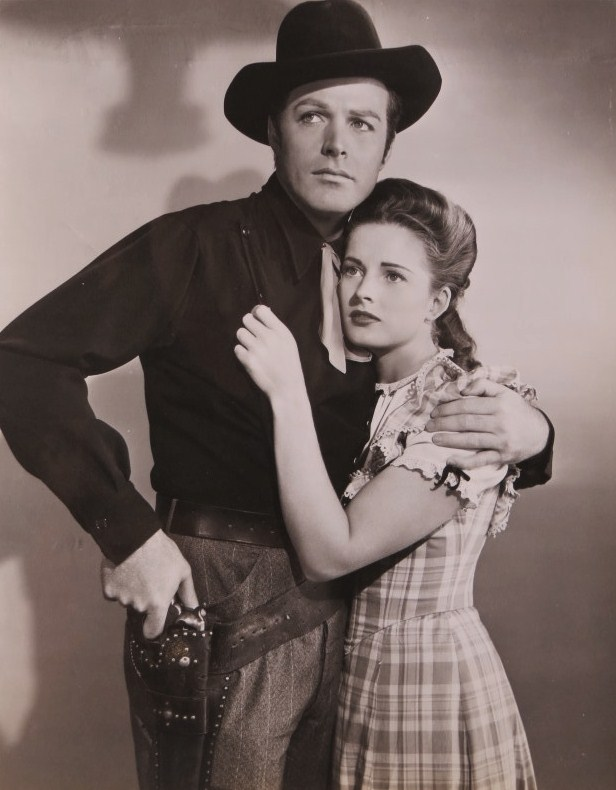
Glenn Langan as Rufe Blackwell and Coleen Gray as Molly Baxter

- Victor Mature as Cash Blackwell
- Coleen Gray as Molly Baxter
- Glenn Langan as Rufe Blackwell
- Reginald Gardiner as Captain Walsh
- Albert Dekker as Leverett
- Fred Clark as Bird
- Charles Kemper as Peaceful Jones
- Robert Warwick as Gen. Fletcher Blackwell
- George Cleveland as Judge
- Roy Roberts as Al Shanks
- Willard Robertson as Gen. Leads
- Griff Barnett as Appleby
- Jay Silverheels as Little Dog

== Production ==
Fury at Furnace Creek was originally titled Ballad at Furnace Creek. Shooting took place near Kanab, Utah, specifically, in Zion National Park. Virgin River, Springdale Johnson Canyon, Utah, as well as on the Arizona Strip. Victor Mature's role was originally meant for John Payne.

== See also ==
Victor Mature
