= I Killed Wild Bill Hickok =

1956 film by Richard Talmadge

- Directed by: Richard Talmadge
- Written by: Johnny Carpenter
- Produced by: Johnny Carpenter
- Starring: Johnny Carpenter; Denver Pyle; Virginia Gibson
- Cinematography: Virgil Miller
- Edited by: Maurice Wright
- Music by: Darrell Calker
- Production company: The Wheeler Company
- Distributed by: The Wheeler Company
- Release date: June 16, 1956
- Running time: 63 minutes
- Country: United States
- Language: English

I Killed Wild Bill Hickok is a 1956 American Western film directed by Richard Talmadge. It is an entirely fictional account of Wild Bill Hickok (Tom Brown) who is the villain of the film. The film was produced and written by Johnny Carpenter who also stars and narrates under the name John Forbes.

== Production ==
The film is the second of two films produced by independent The Wheeler Company. It was shot at the Iverson Ranch in California.

== Cast ==
- Johnny Carpenter as 'Johnny Rebel' Savage
- Denver Pyle as Jim Bailey
- Virginia Gibson as Anne James
- Tom Brown as Sheriff Wild Bill Hickok
- Helen Westcott as Bella Longtree
- I. Stanford Jolley as Henry Longtree
- Frank 'Red' Carpenter as Ring Pardo
- Roy Canada as Nato, the Indian
- Harvey B. Dunn as Dr. Reed
- Lee Sheldon as Kate Savage
- Phil Barton as Pancho, chief thug
- William Mims as Dan Bevins, a rancher
- R.J. Thomas as Tommy, the blacksmith
- Bill Chaney as Tex, a cowpoke
