= Thunder (1929 film) =

1929 film

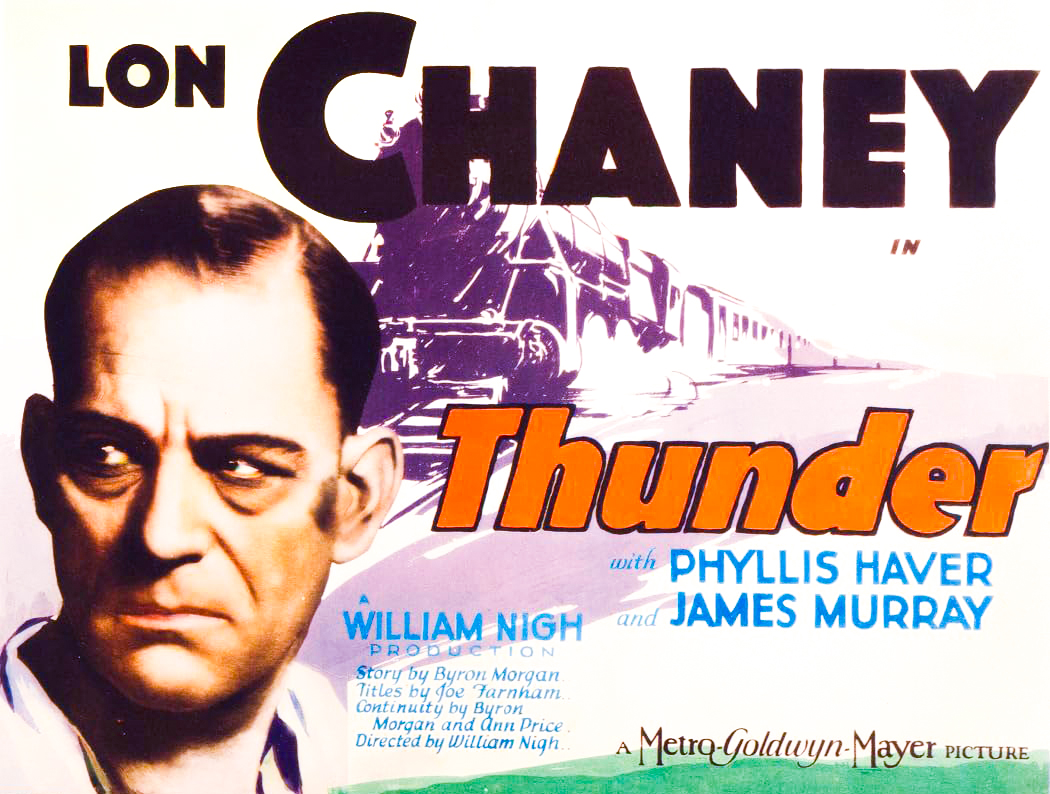
- Directed by: William Nigh
- Written by: Ann Price (scenario); Joseph W. Farnham (intertitles)
- Screenplay by: Byron Morgan
- Story by: Byron Morgan
- Produced by: Hunt Stromberg
- Starring: Lon Chaney; Phyllis Haver; James Murray; Tom Keene; Frances Morris; Wally Albright
- Cinematography: Henry Sharp
- Edited by: Ben Lewis
- Distributed by: Metro-Goldwyn-Mayer
- Release date: July 8, 1929
- Running time: 86 minutes
- Country: United States
- Languages: Sound (Synchronized); English Intertitles
- Box office: $1,018,000

Thunder is a 1929 American synchronized sound melodrama film starring Lon Chaney and directed by William Nigh. The film has no audible dialogue but featured a synchronized musical score and sound effects. The soundtrack was recorded using the Western Electric Sound System sound-on-film process. The soundtrack was also transferred to discs for those theatres that were wired with sound-on-disc sound systems. Thunder was Chaney's penultimate film appearance and his last film without audible dialogue.

The majority of the picture portion of Thunder is now considered lost, with only a half a reel of the entire footage known to survive. The Vitaphone type sound discs are extant, however, and preserve the soundtrack of the film.

== Plot ==
Grumpy Anderson, a railroad engineer with an obsession for running his train on time. His slavishness to promptness causes several tragedies which alienate him from his family. By the story's end, the engineer restores their faith in him and validates his obsession by forcing his train through a flood to bring badly needed Red Cross supplies to the victims.

== Cast ==
- Lon Chaney as Grumpy Anderson
- Phyllis Haver as Zella
- James Murray as Tommy
- Tom Keene as Jim
- Frances Morris as Molly
- Wally Albright, Jr. as Davey
- John MacIntosh as Railroad Man
- Jay Berger as uncredited
- Frankie Genardi as uncredited

== Production notes ==
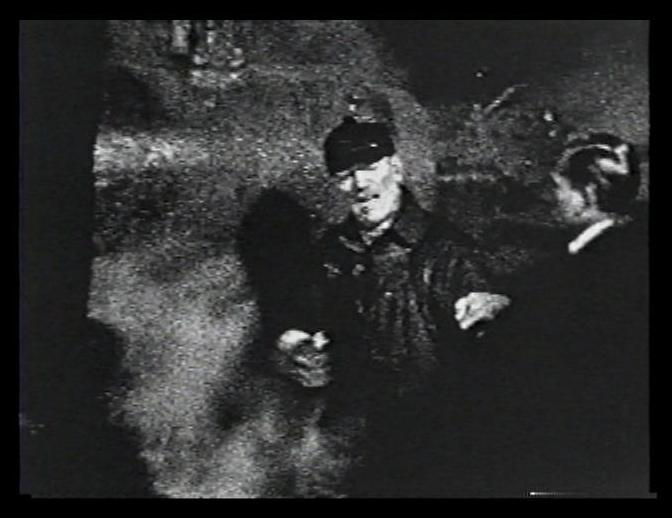
Still from a 9.5mm home movie made by Wencel Brezinski in March 1929 on the set of Thunder in Northeastern Wisconsin

The film was shot on location in Manitowoc, Wisconsin, Green Bay, Wisconsin, Pulaski, Wisconsin, Green Valley, Wisconsin, and Chicago, Illinois. It was there that Chaney caught a cold during the snow scenes which then developed into walking pneumonia. Production was shut down for a time but was eventually completed. Chaney's illness combined with his throat cancer led to his death two months after the release of his last film, and only talkie, 1930's The Unholy Three.

== Reception ==
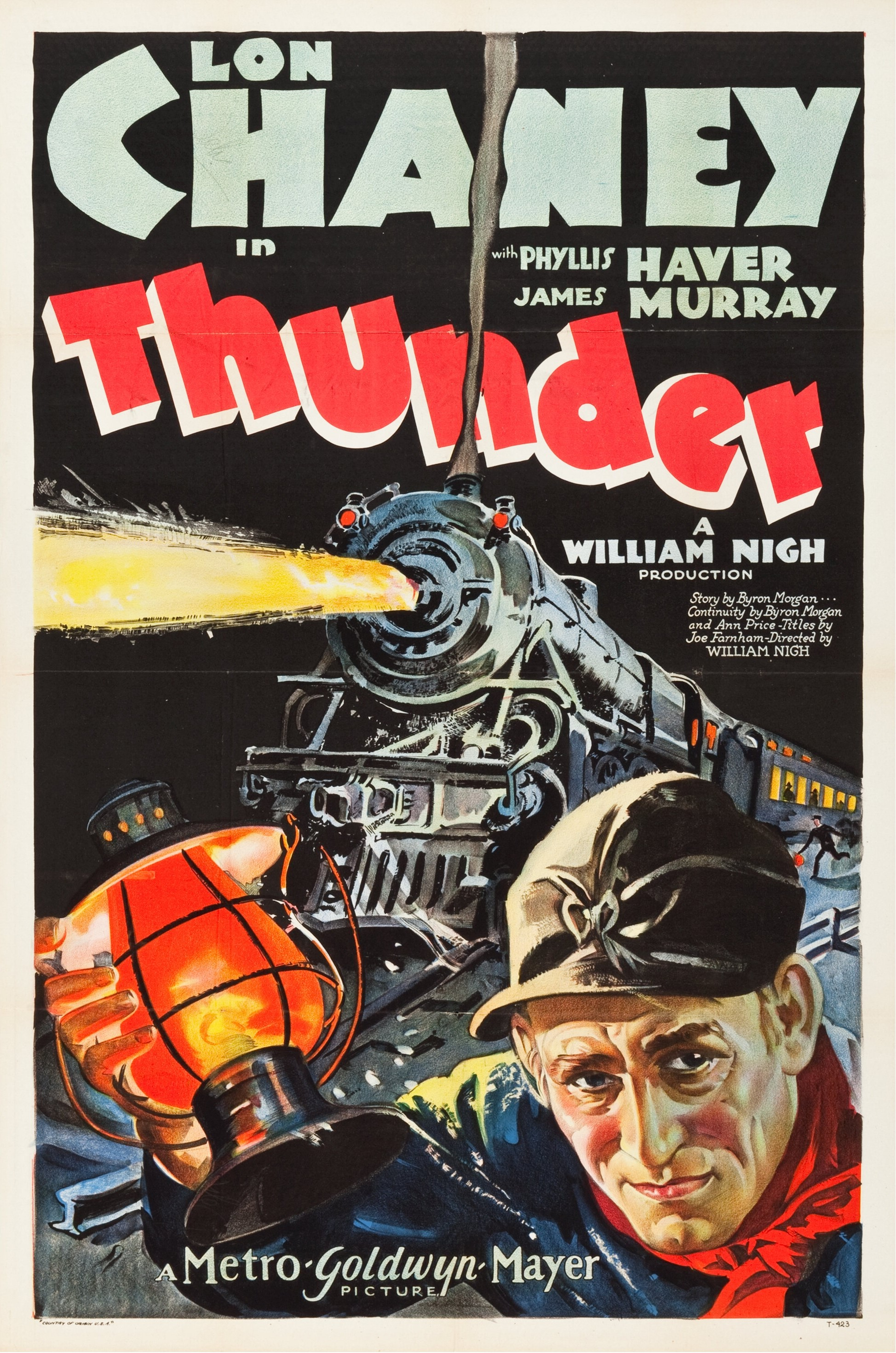
Poster

Thunder was released to theaters on July 8, 1929, and eventually grossed a total of $1,018,000. It was Lon Chaney's fifth highest-grossing film for Metro-Goldwyn-Mayer.

== See also ==
- List of incomplete or partially lost films
- List of early sound feature films (1926–1929)
