= Dixie Jamboree =

1944 film by Christy Cabanne

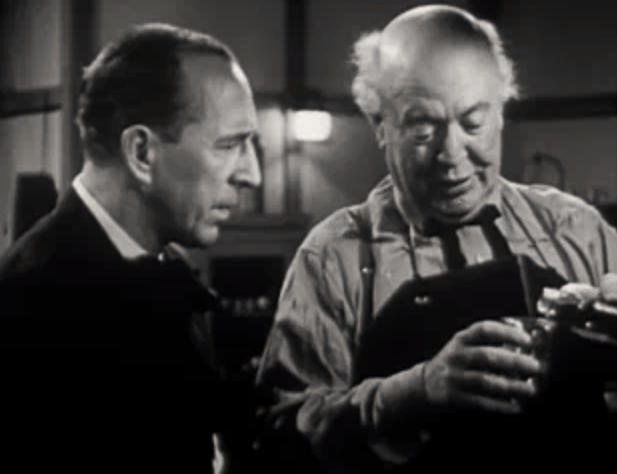
- Charles Butterworth and Guy Kibbee in the film
- Directed by: Christy Cabanne
- Written by: Sam Neuman
- Produced by: Jack Schwarz
- Starring: See below
- Cinematography: Jack MacKenzie
- Edited by: Robert O. Crandall
- Music by: Rudy Schrager
- Distributed by: Producers Releasing Corporation
- Release date: August 15, 1944
- Running time: 72 minutes
- Country: United States
- Language: English

Dixie Jamboree is a 1944 American film directed by Christy Cabanne.

== Cast ==
- Frances Langford as Susan Jackson
- Guy Kibbee as Capt. Jackson of the 'Ellabella'
- Eddie Quillan as Jeff Calhoun
- Charles Butterworth as Professor
- Fifi D'Orsay as Yvette
- Lyle Talbot as Anthony 'Tony' Sardell
- Frank Jenks as Jack 'Curly' Berger
- Almira Sessions as Mrs. Ellabella Jackson, Susan's Aunt
- Joe Devlin as Police Sgt.
- Louise Beavers as Opal
- Ben Carter as Sam the Deckhand, Ben Carter Choir Leader
- Gloria Jetter as Azella, Opal's Daughter
- Ward Shattuck as Henry Doakes
- Ethel Shattuck as Mrs. Henry Doakes
- Anthony Warde as 'Double', Phony Indian
- Angelo Cruz as 'Nothing', Phony Indian

== Soundtrack ==
- Chorus - "You Ain't Right with the Lord" (Written by Michael Breen and Sam Neuman (lyrics))
- Frances Langford - "The Dixie Showboat" (Written by Michael Breen and Sam Neuman (lyrics))
- Frances Langford - "If It's a Dream" (Written by Michael Breen and Sam Neuman (lyrics))
- Fifi d'Orsay - "No, No, No!" (Written by Michael Breen and Sam Neuman (lyrics))
- Frances Langford - "Big Stuff" (Written by Michael Breen and Sam Neuman (lyrics))
- Frances Langford, with trumpet solo by Eddie Quillan "If It's a Dream" (Written by Michael Breen and Sam Neuman (lyrics))

== See also ==
- List of American films of 1944
