= Tap Canutt =

American actor

Edward Clay "Tap" Canutt (August 7, 1932 – June 6, 2014) was an American stunt performer and actor who worked on over 40 films between 1950 and 1980. He was the eldest son of legendary stuntman and rodeo champion Yakima Canutt. He was also the brother of Joseph Canutt.

Tap was born in Los Angeles, California, on August 7, 1932. He died in Santa Clarita, California, on June 6, 2014, at the age of 81.

== Filmography ==
=== Stunt ===
- Only the Valiant (1951)
- The Stranger Wore a Gun (1953)
- Friendly Persuasion (1956)
- Ben-Hur (1959)
- Spartacus (1960)
- The Alamo (1960)
- The Comancheros (1961)
- El Cid (1961)
- It's a Mad, Mad, Mad, Mad World (1963)
- McLintock! (1963)
- The Fall of the Roman Empire - stunt double for Stephen Boyd (1964)
- Cat Ballou (1965)
- The War Lord (1965)
- The Outlaws Is Coming - stunt double for Adam West (1965)
- Khartoum (1966)
- Camelot (1967)
- Bandolero! (1968)
- Planet of the Apes (1968)
- The Wild Bunch (1969)
- The Undefeated (1969)
- A Man Called Horse (1970)
- Chisum (1970)
- Rio Lobo (1970)
- Beneath the Planet of the Apes (1970)
- The Cowboys (1972)
- The Master Gunfighter (1975)

=== Actor ===
- The Stranger Wore a Gun (1953) - Henchman (uncredited)
- The Lawless Rider (1954) - Young Marshal
- In Love and War (1958) - Lt. D'Allesandro (uncredited)
- Rally 'Round the Flag, Boys! (1958) - Soldier (uncredited)
- Thunder in the Sun (1959) - (uncredited)
- 26 Men (1959, TV Series) - Ranger Ben Comstock / Frank Seldom
- Spartacus (1960) - Soldier (uncredited)
- The Alamo (1960) - Bowie's Man (uncredited)
- State Fair (1962) - Red Hoertert
- Daniel Boone (1967, TV Series) - Settler #1
- The Wild Bunch (1969) - Burt (uncredited)
- The Cowboys (1972) - Rustler (final film role)
