= Sam Neuman =

American screenwriter and songwriter

Sam Neuman is an American writer for films and television shows as well as a songwriter. He was also an attorney-at-law.

== Partial filmography ==
- Hitler (1962)
- Buffalo Bill in Tomahawk Territory (1952)
- The Hoodlum (1951)
- I Killed Geronimo (1950)
- Timber Fury (1950)
- Federal Man (1950)
- Timber Fury (1950)
- Down Missouri Way (1946)
- The Enchanted Forest (1945)
- Machine Gun Mama (1944)
- Dixie Jamboree (1944)
- Career Girl (1944)
- Hitler – Dead or Alive (1942)

Neuman also wrote for the television shows The New Adventures of Charlie Chan, Perry Mason, The Outer Limits and Hawaii Five-O.
