= Treasure of Monte Cristo =

1949 film by William A. Berke

- Directed by: William Berke
- Written by: Aubrey Wisberg; Jack Pollexfen
- Produced by: Leonard S. Picker
- Starring: Glenn Langan; Adele Jergens; Steve Brodie
- Cinematography: Benjamin H. Kline (as Benjamin Kline)
- Edited by: Stanley Frazen
- Music by: Albert Glasser
- Production company: Lippert Pictures
- Distributed by: Screen Guild Productions
- Release date: August 27, 1949
- Running time: 78 minutes
- Country: United States
- Language: English

Treasure of Monte Cristo is a 1949 American film noir crime film directed by William Berke and starring Glenn Langan, Adele Jergens and Steve Brodie.

== Plot ==
A descendant of Edmond Dantès finds himself framed for a crime he did not commit.

== Cast ==
- Glenn Langan as Edmund Dantes
- Adele Jergens as Jean Turner
- Steve Brodie as Earl Jackson
- Robert Jordan as Tony Torecelli
- Michael Whalen as Lt. Michael Perry
- George Davis as District Attorney
- Margia Dean as Nurse
- Sid Melton as Tyson (as Sidney Melton)
- Brian O'Hara as Jailer
- Robert Boon as Boatswain
- Jeritza Novak as Miss Jean Turner
- Jimmy O'Neil as Pawnbroker
- Curtis Jarett as Deputy Sheriff
- Charles Regan as Bailey (as Charles Reagan)
- Larry Barton as Hotel Clerk
- Charles Schaeffer as Robert (as Rube Schaeffer)
- Don Junior as Bellboy

== Production ==
The film was entirely shot in location in San Francisco.
