= On the Border (film) =

1930 film

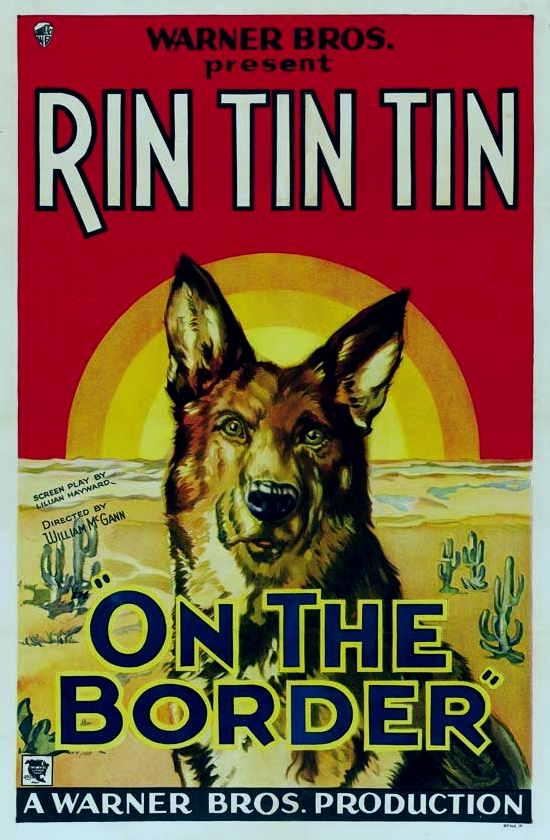
- Theatrical release poster
- Directed by: William C. McGann
- Written by: Lillie Hayward (Screenplay)
- Starring: Rin Tin Tin; Armida; John Litel; Philo McCullough
- Cinematography: William Rees
- Distributed by: Warner Bros. Pictures
- Release date: March 15, 1930
- Running time: 46 minutes (restored version); 6 reel
- Country: United States
- Language: English

On the Border is a 1930 American pre-Code drama film directed by William C. McGann and starring Rin Tin Tin, Armida, John Litel, and Philo McCullough. It was adapted from a story by Lillie Hayward who also wrote the screenplay. Armida sings two songs in the picture.

== Plot ==
Farrell is the head of a smuggling ring who are attempting to smuggle Chinese workers across the border from Mexico. Farrell stops at a hacienda, near the Mexican border, which is owned by Don José. José's dog, Rinty, senses that something is hidden under the vegetables Farrell has in his trucks, and discovers the Chinese. Farrell attempts to buy the hacienda from José. Farrell also hopes to get Pepita, José's daughter, as part of the deal. Meanwhile, some border agents, Dave and Dusty, disguised as tramps, discover Farrell's plans. Pepita and Rinty take a liking to Dave. Meanwhile, José has innocently sold his hacienda to Farrell. When the smugglers find out who Dave really is, they capture him. Rinty manages to save him at the last minute. The Border Patrol then surrounds the hacienda, as Farrell tries to escape in a car, but Rinty captures him in the nick of time.

== Cast ==
- Rin Tin Tin as Rinty
- Armida as Pepita
- John Litel as Dave
- Philo McCullough as Farrell
- Bruce Covington as Don José
- Walter Miller as Border Patrol Commander
- William Irving as Dusty

== Preservation ==
A 16mm copy of the film is preserved at the Wisconsin Center for Film and Theater Research. The Library of Congress-Packard Campus for Audio-Visual Conservation for Film and also holds an incomplete print.
