= Reg Browne =

American film editor and television director

- Born: Reginald Thomas Brown; July 4, 1911; Solano County, California, U.S.
- Died: May 13, 1981 (aged 69); Los Angeles County, California, U.S.
- Occupation(s): Film editor, television director

Reginald Thomas Brown (July 4, 1911 – May 13, 1981) was an American film editor and television director. He directed the western television series 26 Men, which starred Tris Coffin and Kelo Henderson.

== Selected filmography ==
- Appointment in Berlin (1943)
- Cry of the Werewolf (1944)
- The Mark of the Whistler (1944)
- Sergeant Mike (1944)
- The Power of the Whistler (1945)
- Adventures of Rusty (1945)
- Forbidden Jungle (1950)
- The Fighting Stallion (1950)
- Federal Man (1950)
- The Marshal's Daughter (1953)
- Son of the Renegade (1953) - only directing film credit
- Four Fast Guns (1960)
- Tarzan and the Jungle Boy (1968)
- The Gay Deceivers (1969)
- The Curious Female (1970)

== Bibliography ==
- Lentz, Harris (2001). Science Fiction, Horror & Fantasy Film and Television Credits: Filmography. McFarland. ISBN 9780786409525.
