= Melody Parade =

1943 film

- Theatrical release poster
- Directed by: Arthur Dreifuss
- Screenplay by: Tim Ryan; Charles R. Marion
- Produced by: Lindsley Parsons
- Starring: Mary Beth Hughes; Eddie Quillan; Tim Ryan; Irene Ryan; Mantan Moreland; Jerry Cooper
- Cinematography: Mack Stengler
- Edited by: Richard C. Currier
- Production company: Monogram Pictures
- Distributed by: Monogram Pictures
- Release date: August 27, 1943
- Running time: 73 minutes
- Country: United States
- Language: English

Melody Parade is a 1943 American musical film directed by Arthur Dreifuss and written by Tim Ryan and Charles R. Marion. The film stars Mary Beth Hughes, Eddie Quillan, Tim Ryan, Irene Ryan, Mantan Moreland, Jerry Cooper and Armida. The film was released on August 27, 1943, by Monogram Pictures.

== Plot ==
A nightclub hatcheck girl seeks a singing career that she's always dreamed of. A busboy at that nightclub attempts to help her achieve her dreams.

== Cast ==
- Mary Beth Hughes as Anne O'Rourke
- Eddie Quillan as Jimmy Tracy
- Tim Ryan as Happy Harrington
- Irene Ryan as Gloria Brewster
- Mantan Moreland as Skidmore
- Jerry Cooper as himself
- Armida as herself
- André Charlot as Carroll White
- Kenneth Harlan as Jedson
- Cyril Ring as Adams
- Ramon Roz as Ramon Roz
- Ruby Dandridge as Ruby
- Anson Weeks as Orchestra Leader
- Ted Fio Rito as Orchestra Leader
