= Timber Fury =

1950 film by Bernard B. Ray

- Directed by: Bernard B. Ray
- Written by: James Oliver Curwood (story); Sam Neuman; Nat Tanchuck; Michael Hansen
- Produced by: Norman A. Cerf; Bernard B. Ray
- Starring: David Bruce; Laura Lee; Nicla Di Bruno
- Cinematography: Elmer Dyer
- Edited by: Fred Bain
- Music by: Raoul Kraushaar
- Production company: Jack Schwarz Productions
- Distributed by: Eagle-Lion Classics
- Release date: June 2, 1950
- Running time: 63 minutes
- Country: United States
- Language: English

Timber Fury is a 1950 American Western film directed by Bernard B. Ray and starring David Bruce, Laura Lee and Nicla Di Bruno.

== Plot ==
Phyllis Wilson returns to her father Henry Wilson's lumber camp and discovers that he is struggling to protect his business. His foreman, McCabe, is secretly working for Wilson's rival to undermine the company. Wilson hires engineer Jim Caldwell, who soon falls in love with Phyllis. After McCabe murders Wilson, Sheriff Williams suspects Caldwell of the killing.

== Cast ==
- David Bruce as Jim Caldwell
- Laura Lee as Phyllis Wilson
- Nicla Di Bruno as Yvonne
- Sam Flint as Henry Wilson
- George Slocum as Arnold McCabe
- Lee Phelps as Sheriff Williams
- Gil Frye as Pete
- Paul Hoffman as Spike
- Spencer Chan as Chung
- Myron Healey as Paxton Man
- Ray Jones as Barfly
- Hank Mann as Joe, the Bartender

== Bibliography ==
- Pitts, Michael R. Western Movies: A Guide to 5,105 Feature Films. McFarland, 2012.
