= Glenn Langan =

American actor (1917–1991)

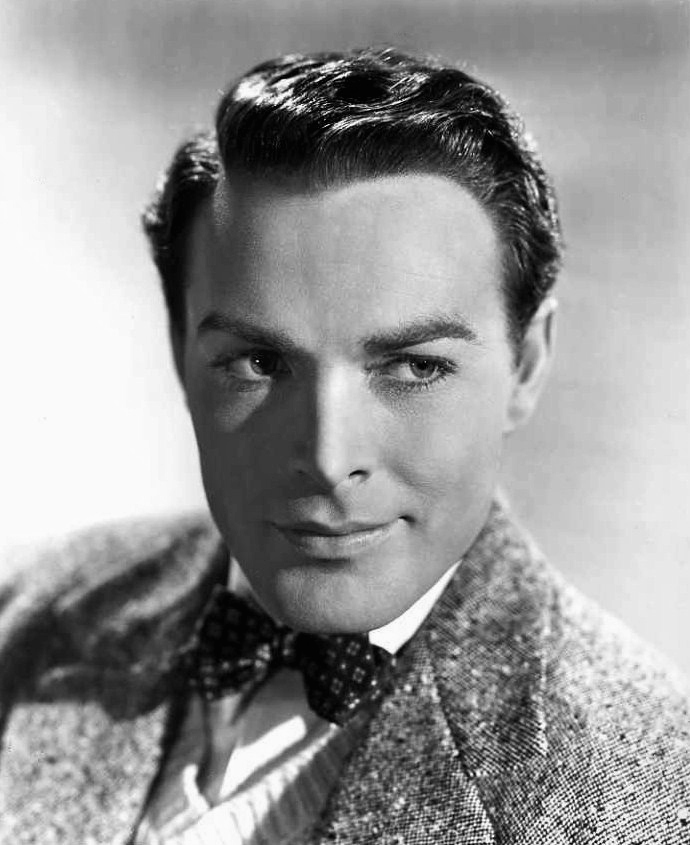
- Born: July 8, 1917; Denver, Colorado, U.S
- Died: January 26, 1991 (aged 73); Camarillo, California, U.S.
- Years active: 1939–1971
- Spouse(s): Helen Weston; Adele Jergens (1951-his death)
- Children: 1

Glenn Langan (July 8, 1917 – January 26, 1991) was an American character actor on stage and films.

== Early years ==
Born in Denver, Colorado, Langan was the son of Thomas Langan and Kate Quinn Langan. He attended schools there. His early training in theatre came in Denver, where he was stage manager at Elitch's Gardens, handling various behind-the-scenes duties.

Langan went to New York, washing dishes in a cafeteria and taking other jobs while he sought acting jobs by visiting producers' offices. Fainting on a street resulted in a stay in Polyclinic Hospital for treatment of malnutrition.

== Career ==
Langan made his Broadway debut in Glamour Preferred (1940). His other Broadway credits included A Kiss for Cinderella (1942), and Fancy Meeting You Again (1952). He made his credited film debut in The Return of Doctor X (1939). His other stage experiences included performing in Johnny Belinda and Glamour Preferred.

Langan appeared as a French professor in the romantic Margie (1946), a devoted young doctor protecting Gene Tierney from the evil machinations of Vincent Price in Dragonwyck (1946), and as one of the psychiatrists looking after demented patient Olivia de Havilland in The Snake Pit (1948). Langan also portrayed privateer Captain Rex Morgan in Forever Amber (1947).

On old-time radio, Langan starred as police inspector Barton Drake on the Mutual crime drama Murder Is My Hobby. He also starred on the syndicated Mystery Is My Hobby, a revision of the earlier program.

Langan's work on television included portraying Jeff Standish on the comedy series Boss Lady (1952). On November 20, 1950, Langan co-starred with Mabel Taliaferro in "The Floor of Heaven" on Studio One on TV.

== Later years/family ==
Langan was married to actress Adele Jergens, with whom he had a son, Tracy. He had earlier been married to showgirl Helen Weston.

== Death ==
On January 26, 1991, Langan died of lymphoma at Pleasant Valley Hospital in Camarillo, California, aged 73.

== Filmography ==
Year	Title	Role	Notes
1939	Everybody's Hobby	Ranger	Uncredited
1939	Dust Be My Destiny	Warden's Secretary	Uncredited
1939	Espionage Agent	Student	Uncredited
1939	The Return of Doctor X	Intern	
1942	Flight Lieutenant	Lt. Anderson's Orderly	Uncredited
1943	Action in the North Atlantic	Gun Crewman	Uncredited
1943	The Strange Death of Adolf Hitler	Youth Leader	Uncredited
1943	Riding High	Jack Holbrook	
1944	Four Jills in a Jeep	Capt. Stewart	Uncredited
1944	Wing and a Prayer	Executive Officer	
1944	In the Meantime, Darling	Lt. Larkin	Uncredited
1944	Something for the Boys	Lieutenant Ashley Crothers	
1945	Hangover Square	Eddie Carstairs	
1945	A Bell for Adano	Lt. Crofts Livingstone, USN	
1946	Sentimental Journey	Judson	
1946	Dragonwyck	Dr. Jeff Turner	
1946	Margie	Prof. Ralph Fontayne	
1947	The Homestretch	Bill Van Dyke III	
1947	Forever Amber	Capt. Rex Morgan	
1948	Fury at Furnace Creek	Capt. Rufe Blackwell / Sam Gilmore	
1948	The Snake Pit	Dr. Terry	
1949	Treasure of Monte Cristo	Edmund Dantes	
1950	The Iroquois Trail	Capt. Jonathan West	
1950	Rapture	Pietro Leoni	
1952	Hangman's Knot	Capt. Petersen	
1953	One Girl's Confession	Johnny	
1953	99 River Street	Lloyd Morgan	
1954	The Big Chase	Officer Pete Grayson	
1955	Outlaw Treasure	Sam Casey	
1957	Jungle Heat	Roger McRae	
1957	The Amazing Colossal Man	Lt. Col. Glenn Manning	
1965	Mutiny in Outer Space	Gen. Knowland	
1966	Women of the Prehistoric Planet	Capt. Ross	
1970	Chisum	Colonel Nathan Dudley	
1971	The Andromeda Strain	Cabinet Secretary	Uncredited
