= Bad Men of the Border =

1945 film directed by Wallace Fox

- Theatrical release poster
- Directed by: Wallace Fox
- Screenplay by: Adele Buffington
- Produced by: Wallace Fox
- Starring: Kirby Grant; Fuzzy Knight; Armida; John Eldredge; Barbara Sears; Edward Howard
- Cinematography: Maury Gertsman
- Edited by: Philip Cahn
- Production company: Universal Pictures
- Distributed by: Universal Pictures
- Release date: September 28, 1945
- Running time: 56 minutes
- Country: United States
- Language: English

Bad Men of the Border is a 1945 American Western film directed by Wallace Fox and written by Adele Buffington. The film stars Kirby Grant, Fuzzy Knight, Armida, John Eldredge, Barbara Sears and Edward Howard. The film was released on September 28, 1945, by Universal Pictures.

== Cast ==
- Kirby Grant as Ted Cameron
- Fuzzy Knight as Mortimer P. 'Rockabye' Jones
- Armida as Dolores Mendoza
- John Eldredge as Bart Breslow
- Barbara Sears as Marie Manning
- Edward Howard as Ace Morgan
- Francis McDonald as Capt. Jose Garcia
- Soledad Jiménez as Estrella
