= Al Clauser =

American songwriter (1911–1989)

- Born: Henry Alfred Clauser; 1911; Manito, Illinois
- Died: March 3, 1989 (aged 77–78); Tulsa, Oklahoma
- Occupations: Musician (guitarist), actor
- Years active: 1928–1989
- Known for: Western swing style
- Notable work: Oklahoma Outlaws (band)

Henry Alfred Clauser (1911–1989) was a guitarist, songwriter and engineer featured on radio shows in Des Moines, Iowa and Tulsa, Oklahoma.

== Early years ==
Clauser was born in Manito, Illinois, on February 23, 1911. While still in high school in Illinois, he formed a trio that played in various clubs. He may have originated the term "Western swing," since he used it as early as 1928. The group was invited to play on the Peoria Illinois radio station, WMBD, where it added two more players. (Note: Clauser hired musicians who could play two or more different instruments, so that the band sounded larger than it actually was.) Although Clauser had never been in Oklahoma, he named his band the Oklahoma Outlaws, later explaining that the style of music they played needed a Western tone and a name to express it.

In 1934, Clauser and the Oklahoma Outlaws moved to Des Moines, Iowa, which had a popular radio show on station WHO, where they were regulars until 1937.

The band specialized in Western swing, playing the popular songs of the day, with Clauser's original songs added in. Al Clauser & His Oklahoma Outlaws appeared in an early Gene Autry film, Rootin' Tootin' Rhythm, and recorded a dozen tracks for ARC. In 1937, Autry called to ask Clauser to bring the band to Hollywood to be in the movie. WHO sportscaster Ronald Reagan asked Clauser if he could come along on the band bus, and Clauser said that would be fine. Reagan's first experience on a movie set was during the shooting of this film. In the 1970s and '80s, the office of Clauser's recording studio had an enormous photograph of Reagan with Reagan's thank-you note for his "start in the business" penned on it in ballpoint ink.

After finishing the movie assignment in 1938, Clauser and his band moved to WCKY in Cincinnati, then moved to WHBF in Rock Island, Illinois, where their shows were aired over 272 Mutual Network stations.

== Move to Tulsa ==
In 1942, Clauser moved the band to Tulsa, Oklahoma, and began a regular weekly program on KTUL Radio. While at KTUL, Clauser added a teenager singer from Claremore, Oklahoma, Clara Ann Fowler, to his band, which was then called the Oklahoma Outlaws. Fowler later achieved international fame using the stage name Patti Page.

Clauser disbanded the Oklahoma Outlaws in the 1950s, but continued to work for KTUL Radio. In the 1970s, he played the role of "Uncle Zeke" on a local kids' television show in Tulsa, Oklahoma, Uncle Zeb's Cartoon Camp, on KTUL TV, where Clauser was also Chief Engineer at the time.

During the 1970s and early '80s, Clauser had a recording studio at Prue, Oklahoma, called Alvera Records, the name being a combination of Al and Vera, his wife's name. His assistant recording engineer was Rocky Frisco, a local musician who, in 1994, became the pianist with the J. J. Cale Band.

Clauser died on March 3, 1989, in Tulsa. The surviving ARC sides, along with several radio transcriptions, were collected and released by Krazy Kat Records in 2004 under the title Hot Western Swing 1937-48.

== Rootin' Tootin' Rhythm (1937 Republic) ==
Gene Autry and Smiley Burnette's adventures with rustlers (Monte Blue, Max Hoffman Jr. and Charlie King) are played for fun. Hal Taliaferro plays Gene's partner in the ranch. Blue is leading lady Ann Pendleton's uncle. Comedy actress Armida plays Pendleton's silly friend and is Gene's love interest. Gene's real-life buddy and songwriting partner, Frankie Marvin, who appears in most of Gene's features, has his biggest role in this film. Al Clauser and his band are the featured group (with Art Davies as a fiddler).
