= Kitty Canutt =

American bronc rider

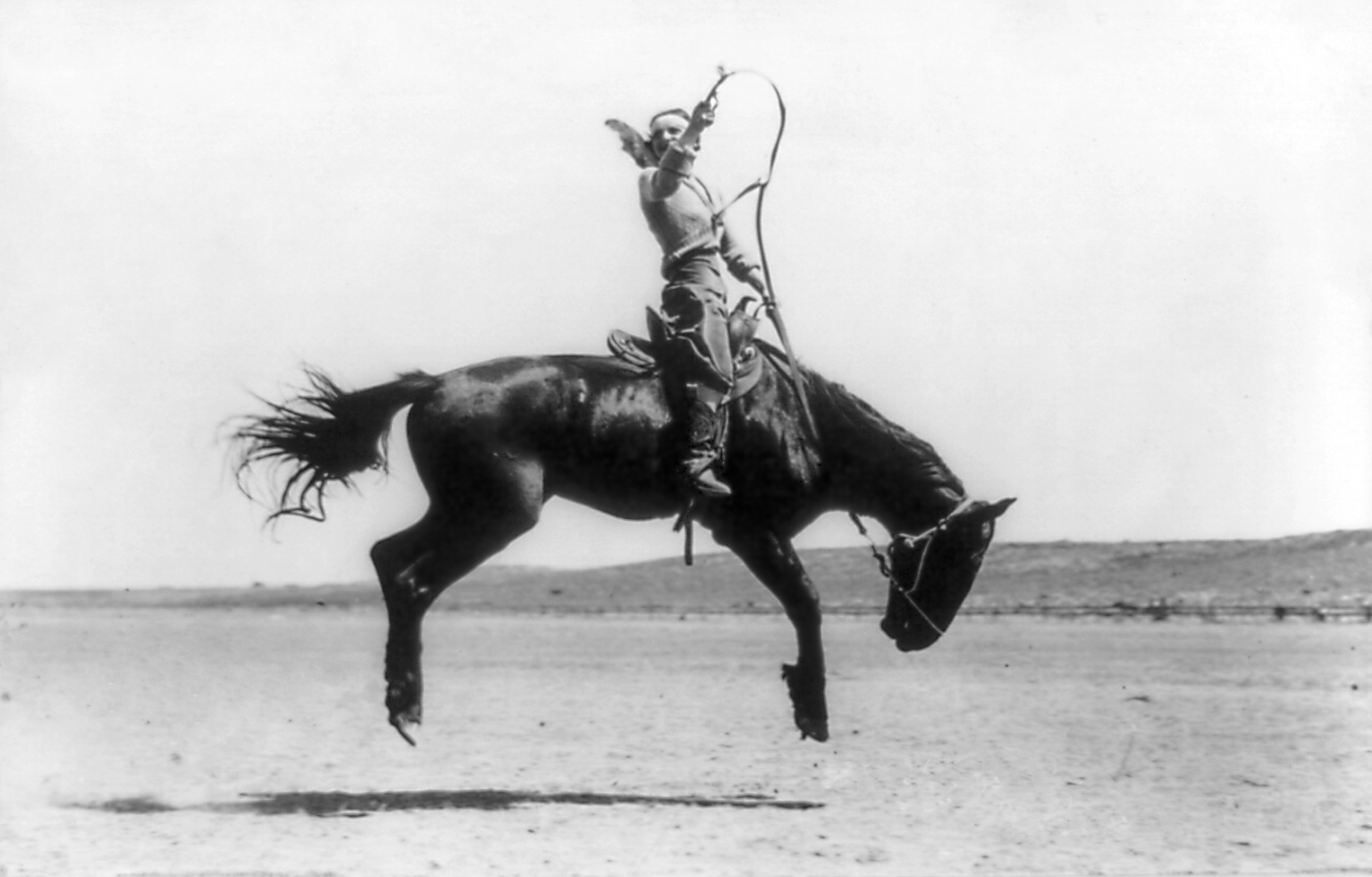
Kitty Canutt, champion lady rider of the world, on Winnemucca, 1919

Kitty Canutt (July 15, 1899 – June 3, 1988), stage name Kitty Wilks (born Katherine Derre in New York City), was an American professional bronc rider. She was the All-Around Champion Cowgirl at the 1916 Pendleton Round-Up in Pendleton, Oregon, for her bucking horse and relay race events. It was at this rodeo that she met Yakima Canutt (Enos Edward Canutt), a winner of the title of All-Around Cowboy at the Pendleton Roundup in 1917, 1919, 1920 and 1923. They were married at Kalispell, Flathead County, Montana on July 20, 1917, and were residents of Los Angeles in 1920. They divorced in 1922. She married Robert C. Long in 1923.

She was known as the "Diamond Girl" or "Diamond Kitty" because she had a diamond set in her front tooth. She would occasionally remove and pawn the diamond when she needed contest entry money.

In 1919, Kitty won the Ladies' Relay Race at the Cheyenne Frontier Days rodeo.
