= The Lawless Rider =

1954 film by Yakima Canutt

- Poster of The lawless rider
- Directed by: Yakima Canutt
- Written by: Edward D. Wood Jr. Johnny Carpenter
- Produced by: Alex Gordon; Johnny Carpenter; Edward D. Wood Jr.
- Starring: Johnny Carpenter; Frankie Darro; Noel Neill
- Cinematography: William C. Thompson
- Edited by: Carlo Lodato
- Music by: Rudy De Saxe
- Production company: Royal West Productions
- Distributed by: United Artists
- Release date: July 1, 1954
- Running time: 62 minutes
- Country: United States
- Language: English
- Budget: $57,000

The Lawless Rider is a 1954 American black-and-white Western film directed by Yakima Canutt and starring Johnny Carpenter, Frankie Darro and Noel Neill, and marketed by United Artists. Ed Wood helped co-write the screenplay, which was originally to be titled The Outlaw Marshall. The film was shot in 1952 but was not released until July 1954 due to cost overruns and legal difficulties.

== Plot ==
The Bascom Ranch, owned by Texas Rose Bascom, is targeted by an outlaw gang with the intent to steal cattle off the ranch. Outlaw Freno Frost runs the rustling gang. One of the gang members is Jim Bascom, Texas Rose Bascom's wayward brother. When she discovers that her brother is running with the outlaws, she seeks help from the law. Sheriff Brown is unable or unwilling to help, so Texas Rose asks her boyfriend, U.S. Marshall Johnny Carpenter, to come to her aid. Johnny Carpenter shows up in town, in disguise, and impersonates the gunslinger Rod Tatum in order to infiltrate the outlaw gang. Texas Rose Bascom performs her fancy trick roping act for the townfolk, but ruffians interrupt the event. Confusion follows when the real Rod Tatum and the impersonator meet on the street.

== Cast ==
- Johnny Carpenter as Johnny Carpenter and Rod Tatum
- Earl W. Bascom (a co-producer) as an outlaw
- Noel Neill as Nancy James
- Texas Rose Bascom as Texas Rose Bascom
- Frankie Darro as Jim Bascom
- Kenne Duncan as Freno Frost
- Dale Barrell as The Kid
- Douglass Dumbrille as Marshall Brady
- Bud Osborne as Tulsa
- Weldon Bascom as Sheriff Brown
- Shirley Belger as Sis
- Bob Burns as a rancher of the Saddle Kings Band
- Roy Canada as Andy
- Tap Canutt as Young Marshall
- Frank "Red" Carpenter as Big Red
- Fred Carson as Snake Eyes
- Bill Chaney as Bill
- Bill Coontz as Red Rock
- Johnny Dew as Carson
- Hank Caldwell as leader
- Leonard P. Geer as Jack
- Ray Morgan as Scar
- Blackie Pickerel as Raven
- Lou Roberson as Black Jack Ketchum
- Frank Robbins as Larrabie
- Lennie Smith as Lennie
- Ted Smith as Ted
- Tommy Thomas as a blacksmith

== Sound track ==
- "Thinking of You", sung by Texas Rose Bascom

== Stunts ==
- Weldon Bascom
- Tap Canutt
- Yakima Canutt, director
- Frank "Red" Carpenter
- Fred Carson
- Bill Coontz

== Other credits and crew members ==
- Rudy DeSaxe, music
- William C. Thompson, director of cinematography
- Carlo Lodato, film editing
- Micky Meyers, costume design
- Bud Sweeney, makeup artist
- Willard Kirkham, assistant director
- Glen Glenn, sound
- Fred Grossi, still photography
- John C. Fuller, editor
- George N. Brown, transportation
- Winifred Gibson, script supervisor
- Sam Tilden, public relations

== Producers ==
- Alex Gordon, executive producer
- Johnny Carpenter, producer
- Edward D. Wood Jr., producer
- Weldon Bascom, associate producer

== Production history ==
The film was financed by a group of Mormons. The original budget was $20,000 but it went over budget. There were legal troubles which meant the film took two years to be released. Producer Alex Gordon became entangled in debt over the film's cost overruns and got Samuel Z. Arkoff involved in the negotiations to get the film released. Arkoff got Gordon out of the financial mess he was in and got the film released eventually through United Artists. Gordon would go on to make several other movies with Arkoff. Gordon's friend/ roommate Ed Wood worked on the movie's screenplay with the film's star Johnny Carpenter.
