= Armida (actress) =

Mexican actress (1911–1989)

Armida Vendrell
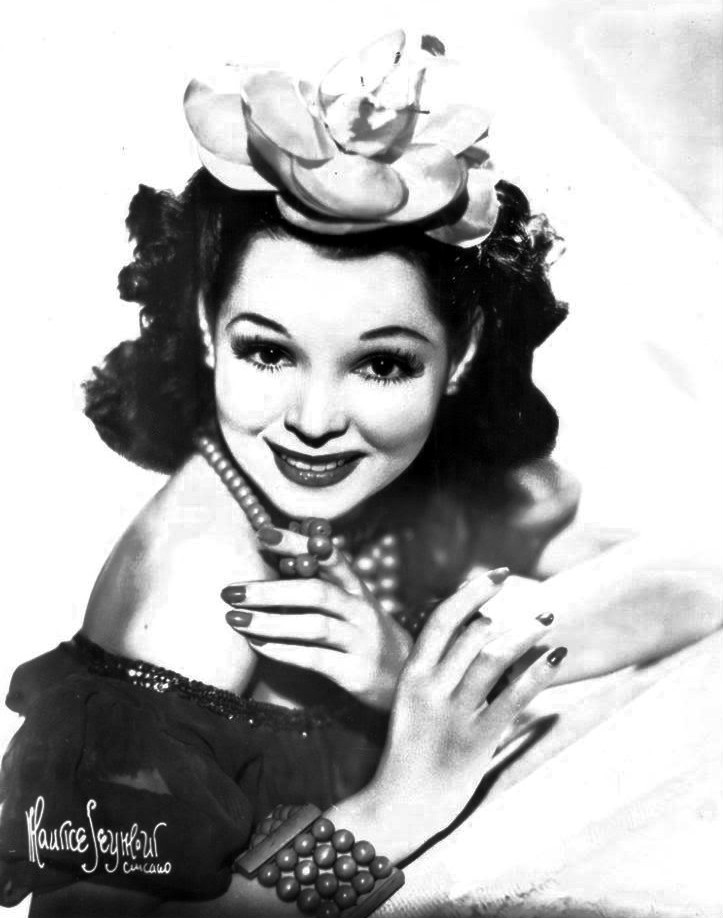
- Vendrell in 1949
- Born: Armida Vendrell; May 29, 1911; Aguascalientes, Mexico
- Died: October 23, 1989 (aged 78); Victorville, California, U.S.
- Occupations: Actress, singer, dancer, vaudevillian
- Years active: 1927–1951 (film)
- Height: 150 cm (4 ft 11 in)

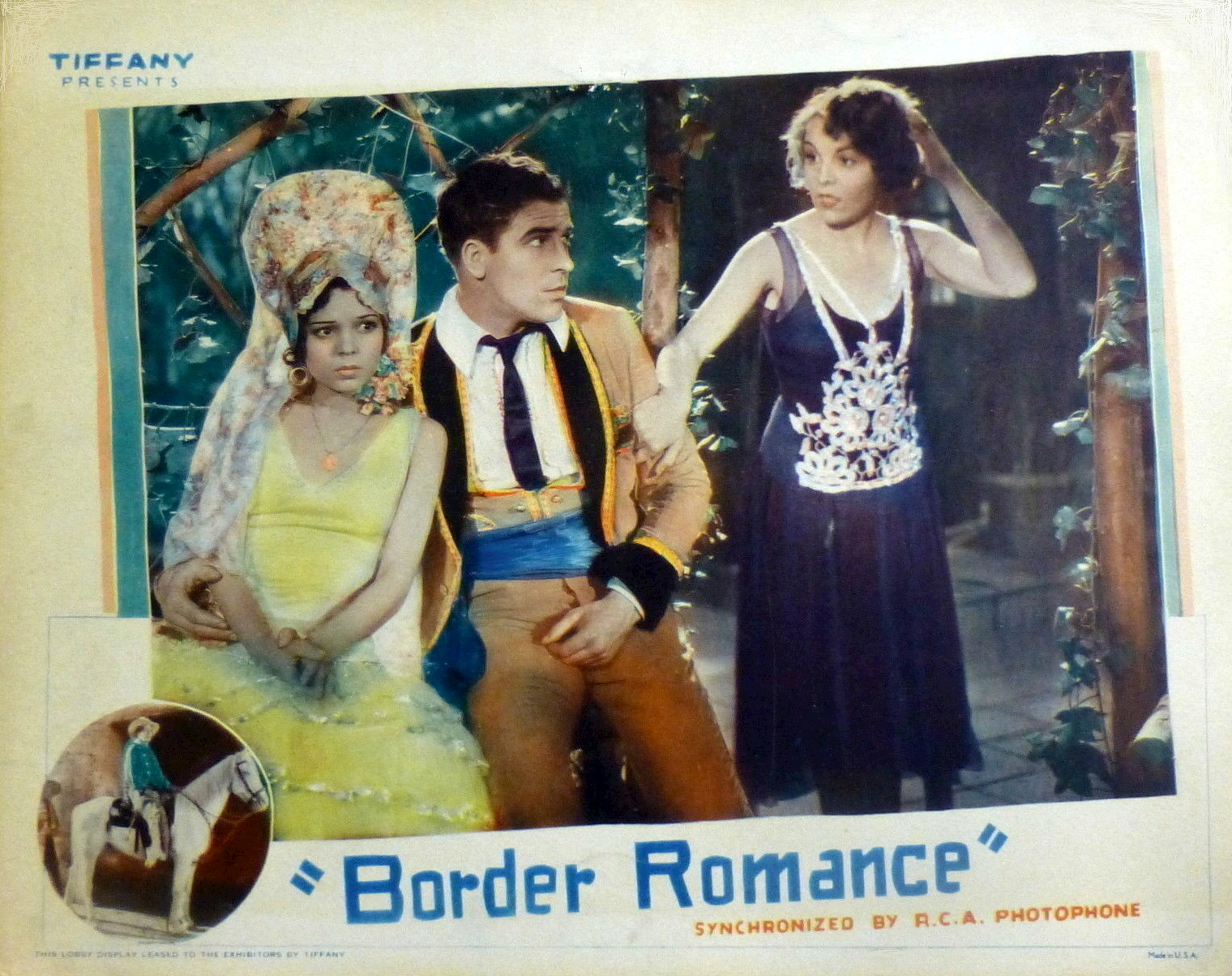
Armida (at left), with Don Terry and Marjorie Kane in her 1929 film debut, Border Romance

Armida Vendrell (29 May 1911 – 23 October 1989) was a Mexican actress, singer, dancer and vaudevillian.

== Early life ==
Armida was born in Aguascalientes, Mexico, to Maria Camalich and Joaquin Vendrell. Her father was a well known magician called "The Great Arnold" who emigrated to Mexico from Barcelona, Spain. She also had two sisters who were performers as well, Lydia Vendrell and Lola Vendrell. By the time she reached the age of nineteen she had a long-term screen contract. She purchased a home where she lived with her family. She aspired to send her younger sisters to college.

Vendrell was five feet (152 cm) tall with high heels and two inches less without them. As a child she spoke only Spanish.

== Vaudeville in California ==
Armida started performing at a young age, when her family moved from Mexico to the United States, her father opened the first movie theater in Douglas, Arizona. She and her sisters would sing and dance during intermission and her father would perform an illusionist act.

Armida was discovered in the old Hidalgo theater in the Plaza in Los Angeles. Armida was appearing in a small, home-manufactured vaudeville skit, along with her sister Delores. A talent scout for a coastal vaudeville circuit was in the audience and offered her a chance to perform on a "four-a-day" vaudeville bill (meaning four shows a day). Armida graduated to various Broadway productions after being discovered by Gus Edwards, stage and screen actor, songwriter, and dance instructor. She participated in as many as twenty-four vaudeville numbers a day while in New York. Edwards brought her back to Hollywood with him and featured her in an MGM two-color Technicolor movie short, Gus Edwards' International Colortone Revue (1929). Gus once said of Armida, that she possessed "the emotional temperament of an actress capable of surmounting the most difficult of histrionic roles".

== Film career ==
In 1929, when Armida was eighteen, Warner Bros. offered her a five-year contract. Her first film of note, General Crack (1929), featured her opposite the studio's leading actor, John Barrymore. Armida worked in Warner films for one year, including its expensive musical revue Show of Shows (1929), only to have her five-year contract canceled when movie musicals went out of fashion in 1930. She returned to Broadway in Nina Rosa (1930–31).

Armida resumed her film career in 1934 at the low-budget Mascot studio, with the William Haines vehicle The Marines Are Coming (1934). She went on to appear in Under the Pampas Moon (1935), the Gene Autry musical western Rootin' Tootin' Rhythm (1937), Patio Serenade (1938), Bad Men of the Border (1945), the serial Congo Bill (1948), and the Cisco Kid western The Gay Amigo (1949). Her final role was in Monogram's Rhythm Inn (1951), in which she had a dance specialty. During the 1940s she had a few credits in which she was prominently featured: Fiesta (1941, in Technicolor), The Girl from Monterrey (1943), and Machine Gun Mama (1944).

== Filmography ==
- Rhythm Inn (1951) ..... Herself, dance specialty
- The Gay Amigo (1949) ..... Rosita
- Congo Bill (1948) ..... Zalea
- Jungle Goddess (1948) ..... Wanama
- Cuban Madness (1946, short subject)..... Herself
- Bad Men of the Border (1945) ..... Dolores Mendoza
- South of the Rio Grande (1945) ..... Pepita
- Machine Gun Mama (1944) ..... Nita
- Here Comes Kelly (1943)
- Melody Parade (1943) ..... Armida
- The Girl from Monterrey (1943) ..... Lita Valdez
- Always in My Heart (1942) ..... Lolita
- Fiesta (1941, in Technicolor) ..... Cuca
- South of Tahiti (1941) ..... Putara
- Out Where the Stars Begin (1941) (short subject in Technicolor) .... Herself
- La Conga Nights (1940)
- Patio Serenade (1938, short subject)
- Rootin' Tootin' Rhythm (1937)
- Border Cafe (1937) as Dominga
- Under the Pampas Moon (1935)
- The Marines Are Coming (1934)
- The Peanut Vendor (1933 Screen Songs cartoon, with Armida appearing in live action)
- Under a Texas Moon (1930)
- On the Border (1930) as Pepita
- Wings of Adventure (1930)
- General Crack (1929, with Technicolor scenes)
- Show of Shows (1929; most Technicolor scenes no longer exist)
- Border Romance (1929)
- Smiling Billy (1927)

== Death ==
Armida Vendrell died in Victorville, California, on October 23, 1989, of a heart attack.
