= Johnny Carpenter =

American actor (1914–2003)

- Born: Jasper Carpenter; June 25, 1914; Dardanelle, Arkansas, U.S.
- Died: February 27, 2003 (aged 88); Burbank, California, U.S.
- Other names: Josh Carpenter; John Forbes
- Years active: 1935–1972

Johnny Carpenter (Jasper Carpenter; June 25, 1914 – February 27, 2003) was an American film actor, screenwriter and producer. He was known mostly for his work in Westerns and for his association with actor and filmmaker Ed Wood. He used the stage names John, Johnny, Josh, and John Forbes.

== Film career ==
Johnny began working in Hollywood in the mid-1940s, mostly in bit parts in B-Westerns. By 1950, Johnny had graduated to larger roles in films produced by Jack Schwarz, including Border Outlaws and Cattle Queen, his breakout film. He starred in several more B-Westerns, all the while continuing to do stunt work in higher profile films.

From 1953 to 1956, Carpenter produced four movies independently; Son of the Renegade (1953), The Lawless Rider (1954), Outlaw Treasure (1955) and I Killed Wild Bill Hickok (1956). These four films have drawn comparisons between Carpenter and his friend Ed Wood, who actually helped produce The Lawless Rider and may have worked on Son of the Renegade, as well. Carpenter would also make a featured appearance in Wood's 1959 film, Night of the Ghouls.

By the 1960s, Western film work had dried up and Carpenter's output decreased, with his last film role being in 1961's Tomboy and the Champ.

== Heaven on Earth ==
In addition to his work in Western films and television, Carpenter was known for his interest in horses. He operated the "Heaven on Earth" ranch, initially located in Glendale, California, and later in Lake View Terrace. Established in the mid-1940s, the ranch provided recreational opportunities for children with disabilities, many of whom came from the Los Angeles area. The facility featured horses and a mock Western town setting and remained in operation until Carpenter's eviction from the property in 1994. The ranch operated for approximately fifty years.

Carpenter died in Burbank, California, in 2003, at age 88.
