= Jack Schwarz =

American film producer

- Born: Jack Irving Schwarz; December 19, 1896; Chicago
- Died: January 6, 1987 (aged 90); Los Angeles, California
- Occupation: film producer
- Known for: work with Frank Buck
- Spouse: Marie Louise Talbott (divorced 1952)

Jack Irving Schwarz (December 19, 1896 – January 6, 1987) was an American independent producer of low-budget feature films in the 1940s and 1950s.

== Early life ==
Schwarz was born in Chicago, the son of Adolph Schwarz, a traveling clothing salesman, and Dora (Goodman) Schwarz, according to the 1910 US census. He operated a small chain of movie theaters in Kentucky and Indiana in the 1930s, and decided to enter the more lucrative field of film production in 1942.

== Movies ==
Schwarz became a staff producer for Producers Releasing Corporation (PRC), the smallest of Hollywood's studios with national distribution. He made some of the company's better films, including Baby Face Morgan with Richard Cromwell (1942), The Payoff with Lee Tracy (1942), Dixie Jamboree with Frances Langford (1944), Tiger Fangs with Frank Buck (1944), and the Cinecolor fantasy The Enchanted Forest with Harry Davenport (1945).

He later entered into releasing arrangements with fellow exhibitor-turned-producer Robert L. Lippert, publicity man-turned-producer Edward Finney, and PRC's successor Eagle-Lion Films. In 1949 he produced four Red Ryder westerns with Jim Bannon, noteworthy at the time for being filmed in Cinecolor. Jack Schwarz's most widely distributed film is probably Gold Raiders, released by United Artists in 1951 and again in 1958. This is a budget western co-starring veteran screen actor George O'Brien and The Three Stooges.

== Plagiarism suit ==
In 1945, Schwarz filed a plagiarism action against Universal Pictures and its executives. He alleged that the studio had pirated a romantic movie manuscript that contained musical themes, and used the material in one of the studio's own movie productions, His Butler’s Sister (1943), which allegedly involved a similar theme. The court read the scenario, viewed the movie, and held in favor of the studio and its executives.

== Personal life ==
In May 1944, 13-year-old Patsy Ruth Brown disappeared after leaving Schwarz's Fox Wilshire Building penthouse. Schwarz told juvenile officers that Patsy had spent the afternoon in his apartment. That evening he gave her three dollars for a taxi. According to Schwarz, Patsy left in the company of an older girl named O'Hara, whom Patsy had brought with her. Schwarz said that Patsy had begged him numerous times for a role in one of his films. Her only film appearance (uncredited) was in Nearly Eighteen (1943), not one of Jack Schwarz's productions. A taxi driver who took Patsy to Union Station told the police that Patsy said she was going to San Bernardino to visit her father, an employee of a Barstow, California rock company. However, the taxi driver's tip failed to help police trace the missing girl.

Schwarz was married to redheaded actress Marie Louise Talbott, who divorced him in 1952, stating in court that he stayed out all night and came home with lipstick on his clothes.

== Later life ==
Schwarz produced his last film in 1953. He owned the Copra Room nightclub and restaurant, 740 East Broadway, in Long Beach, California. He died in Los Angeles in 1987, shortly after his 90th birthday.

== Selected filmography ==
- Girls' Town (1942)
- The Payoff (1942)
- The Enchanted Forest (1945)
- Ride, Ryder, Ride! (1949)
- Cattle Queen (1951)
- Gold Raiders (1951)
- Buffalo Bill in Tomahawk Territory (1952)
- Son of the Renegade (1953)
