= The Madonna's Secret =

1946 film by Wilhelm Thiele

- Directed by: Wilhelm Thiele
- Written by: Bradbury Foote; Wilhelm Thiele
- Produced by: Stephen Auer
- Starring: Francis Lederer; Gail Patrick; Ann Rutherford; Edward Ashley
- Cinematography: John Alton
- Edited by: Fred Allen
- Music by: Joseph Dubin
- Production company: Republic Pictures
- Distributed by: Republic Pictures
- Release date: February 16, 1946 (United States)
- Running time: 79 minutes
- Country: United States
- Language: English

The Madonna's Secret is a 1946 American film noir crime film directed by Wilhelm Thiele and starring Francis Lederer, Gail Patrick, Ann Rutherford and Edward Ashley.

== Plot ==
In an art gallery, drama critic John Earl sees a portrait of a beautiful woman painted by James Harlan Corbin [Lederer], gazing at it, entranced. He asks the gallery owner who the model was; the owner says that it was the artist's only model and is not for sale. Puzzled, Earl returns to his office; he knows the face but cannot remember her name. He phones Corbin with a proposal to buy the painting, but Corbin refuses.

Earl continues his pursuit to find out who the model for the painting was. He learns her name is Helen North (Linda Stirling), but the young woman looks nothing like the woman in the painting. He visits with her to learn Corbin's location, but she refuses, telling him that she will be singing at a local nightclub which Corbin frequents. Earl confronts Corbin there, while the artist is sketching a stabbing, with what he has remembered of Corbin being accused of murdering his first model, Madeleine. Corbin is adamant that he was completely exonerated of her murder. Becoming clearly annoyed, Corbin invites the singer out for a night in his yacht. She agrees, but her body is later found washed ashore. Although Police Lt. Roberts initially questions Helen's suitor, Hunt Mason, Mason implicates Corbin as the last person who saw Helen North.

John Earl works with the police department to arrange for Helen's sister, Linda (Ann Rutherford), to apply for modeling, in order to spy on Corbin. The two return to Corbin's boathouse. While there, Linda calls for Earl and tells his chef that she is in danger and to notify the police. She is suspicious of Corbin when he acts moodily, when he plays "weird and strange" improvised music on the piano, when he throws away her tiny revolver she brought in her purse for protection, and again when he mixes drinks for the two of them. But when Corbin drinks her drink rather than let it go to waste, she knows for certain he is not plotting anything against her. Another wealthy woman, Mrs. Ella Randolph (Gail Patrick) tries twice to buy Corbin's art, but he refuses. Since Corbin is convinced Linda was only around to spy on him, he strikes up a flirtatious friendship with Ella. When Ella tells Linda she is going to marry Corbin, Linda angrily congratulates Ella and hurriedly leaves in tears. But Ella is turned down by Corbin when she proposes marriage. She tells Corbin he will end up with Linda. Corbin leaves Ella in her car, and when Ella returns home, she receives a phone call from someone who invites her to go back to Corbin's boathouse. When she arrives at the door, the curtains are suddenly drawn. Back in his own apartment/studio, Corbin lies down on a couch, exhausted, and has a dream of kissing Helen, who suddenly screams and falls into the water, disappearing in the darkness. Then he dreams of Madeleine, but when he kisses her, she also screams and falls into the water and darkness. Linda awakens Corbin, who is distraught but explains he made the other women die, and there are some things so fearful the mind rejects them. Linda tells him it is only a dream. He tells her she needs to go away, and Linda replies that since he is getting married, his wife can model for him. He tells Linda he has seen Ella for the last time. As they kiss, they are interrupted by the police, who are looking for Mrs. Ella Randolph, whose car was found abandoned.

The police hold Corbin for questioning and tell him Mrs. Randolph was murdered in the same way as the other women. Corbin seems confused and doubts his memory. Linda and Corbin's mother come to the district attorney's office. The D.A. is convinced that Corbin is refusing to confess and asks Linda to convince him. But Linda tells Corbin not to confess. The district attorney holds up a piece of fur that was torn from Mrs. Ella Randolph's dress, which was found in his boathouse. Corbin continues to say he is confused, and Linda persists in saying she will fight for him, because she believes in him. Linda returns home with Corbin's mother, who first tells Linda to lie down on a couch due to having a headache. Mrs. Corbin sounds sympathetic and shares how she also has headaches which "almost drive me mad." She goes into the kitchen but completely closes the door between the two rooms to make some tea. The scene changes back to James Corbin, who is pacing in his jail cell. He is mulling over the way Ella's torn fur was found in his own boathouse. He suddenly calls out, "Linda, Linda!" He calls for the guards to bring the District Attorney.

Back at the Corbin house, Linda drinks the whole cup of tea that Mrs. Corbin brings her, telling Linda she is prettier than the others. Linda says she feels sleepy and that her arms feel numb. Mrs. Corbin tells Linda she must go to sleep like the others, so that James can be "great," and because Linda cannot love and protect Corbin the way his mother does. Mrs. Corbin rolls up Linda's sleeve and tries to inject her with a lethal substance before the police shoot her through the window and break down the door. The police arrive just in time to save Linda from death but not Mrs. Corbin, who dies in her son's arms.

== Cast ==
- Francis Lederer as James Harlan Corbin
- Gail Patrick as Ella Randolph
- Ann Rutherford as Linda
- Edward Ashley as John Earl
- Linda Stirling as Helen North
- John Litel as Police Lt. Roberts
- Leona Roberts as Mrs. Corbin
- Michael St. Angel as Hunt Mason
- Clifford Brooke as Mr. Hadley
- Pierre Watkin as District Attorney
- Will Wright as The Riverman
- Geraldine Wall as Miss Joyce
- John Hamilton as Lambert
- Bob Alden as Office Boy
- Roy Barcroft as Undetermined Role
- James Carlisle as Doctor
- Tanis Chandler as Singer
- Anne Chedister as Madonna
- Gino Corrado as Boucher - Waiter
- Jack Daley as Bartender Flynn
- Edythe Elliott as Landlady
- Eric Feldary as Knife Thrower
- Pat Flaherty as Policeman
- Alex Havier as Ling
- George Magrill as Policeman
- Frank O'Connor as Guard
- Lee Phelps as Detective
- Rose Plumer as Bit Role
- Harry Strang as Policeman
- Russ Whiteman as Interne

== Bibliography ==
- Alvarez, Max. The Crime Films of Anthony Mann. Univ. Press of Mississippi, 2013.
