= What a Blonde =

1945 American film directed by Leslie Goodwins

- Directed by: Leslie Goodwins; James Casey
- Screenplay by: Charles Roberts
- Story by: Oscar Brodney
- Produced by: Ben Stoloff
- Starring: Leon Errol; Richard Lane; Michael St. Angel; Elaine Riley
- Cinematography: J. Roy Hunt
- Edited by: Edward W. Williams
- Music by: Leigh Harline
- Distributed by: RKO Radio Pictures
- Release date: January 27, 1945 (US)
- Running time: 72 minutes
- Country: United States
- Language: English

What a Blonde is a 1945 American screwball comedy film directed by Leslie Goodwins and starring Leon Errol, Richard Lane, Michael St. Angel, and Elaine Riley. The screenplay, by Charles E. Roberts, was based on a story by Oscar Brodney. The film was released by RKO Radio Pictures on January 27, 1945.

== Plot ==
After running out of gas coupons due to wartime rationing, a lingerie tycoon must carpool with two other people in order to receive more. When he invites one of his new employees and a showgirl to be his "riders" a whole series of misunderstandings ensue. A group of chorus girls move into the tycoon's mansion and takeover everything.

== Cast ==
- Leon Errol as F. Farrington Fowler
- Richard Lane as Pomeroy
- Michael St. Angel as Andrew Kent
- Elaine Riley as Cynthia Richards
- Veda Ann Borg as Pat Campbell
- Lydia Bilbrook as Mrs. Fowler
- Clarence Kolb as Charles DaFoe
- Ann Shoemaker as Mrs. DaFoe
- Chef Milani as Tony Gugliemi
- Emory Parnell as McPherson - A1

== Production ==
The film's working title was Come Share My Love.
