= Pedro Regas =

American actor (1897–1974)

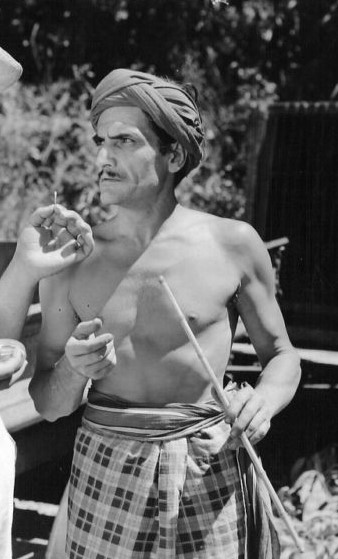
- Regas in the Frank Buck film Tiger Fangs (1943)
- Born: Panagiotis Thomas Regakos; April 18, 1897; Hollywood, California, U.S.
- Died: August 10, 1974 (aged 77); Hollywood, Los Angeles, California, U.S.
- Resting place: Hollywood Forever Cemetery
- Occupation: Actor
- Years active: 1927–1970

Petros "Pedro" Regas (born Panagiotis Thomas Regakos; April 18, 1897 – August 10, 1974 in Hollywood, Los Angeles), a veteran stage actor, Regas was spotted on the Broadway stage by Mary Pickford who persuaded him to go to Hollywood and be in pictures, which he did in 1920 and continued to play in films for 50 years.

Regas died of a heart attack and was interred in the Hollywood Forever Cemetery.

== Partial filmography ==
- Señorita (1927) - Hernandez Gaucho (uncredited)
- The Ridin' Renegade (1928) - Little Wolf
- Two Fisted Justice (1931) - Henchman Cheyenne Charlie
- Law and Order (1932) - Mexican (uncredited)
- Scarface (1932) - Tony - Bodyguard (uncredited)
- The Mouthpiece (1932) - One of J.B.'s Henchmen (uncredited)
- Thunder Below (1932) - Messenger (uncredited)
- Tiger Shark (1932) - Crewman (uncredited)
- Trailing the Killer (1932) - Manuel
- The Barbarian (1933) - Dragoman (uncredited)
- Fighting Texans (1933) - Store Customer (uncredited)
- Flying Down to Rio (1933) - Waiter (uncredited)
- Viva Villa! (1934) - Tomás
- Grand Canary (1934) - Henchman (uncredited)
- West of the Pecos (1934) - Manuel
- Black Fury (1935) - Tony - a Miner (uncredited)
- Under the Pampas Moon (1935) - Jockey (uncredited)
- The Adventures of Rex and Rinty (1935, Serial) - Pasha [Chs. 1-4, 7-11]
- Sutter's Gold (1936) - De La Cruz (uncredited)
- Give Us This Night (1936) - Fisherman
- Robin Hood of El Dorado (1936) - Lookout Yelling 'Murrietta Comes!' (uncredited)
- The Traitor (1936) - Pedro Moreno
- Lady Luck (1936) - Head Barber (uncredited)
- Mummy's Boys (1936) - Fakir (uncredited)
- Waikiki Wedding (1937) - Cab Driver (uncredited)
- Midnight Taxi (1937) - Dazetta (uncredited)
- Behind the Headlines (1937) - (uncredited)
- Border Cafe (1937) - Mexican Policeman (uncredited)
- The Girl of the Golden West (1938) - Renegade in Prologue (uncredited)
- Tropic Holiday (1938) - Peón (uncredited)
- Juarez (1939) - Antonio Regales (uncredited)
- Only Angels Have Wings (1939) - Pancho
- Code of the Secret Service (1939) - Diego (uncredited)
- The Rains Came (1939) - Official (uncredited)
- Road to Singapore (1940) - Zato - Policeman (uncredited)
- They Drive by Night (1940) - Harry's Partner (uncredited)
- North West Mounted Police (1940) - Half-breed Archer (uncredited)
- Our Wife (1941) - Cuban Driver (uncredited)
- The Night of January 16th (1941) - Cuban Bartender (uncredited)
- Remember Pearl Harbor (1942) - Code Interpreter (uncredited)
- Perils of Nyoka (1942) - Ibrahim - Bedouin [Ch.1] (uncredited)
- Action in the North Atlantic (1943) - Greek Seaman (uncredited)
- For Whom the Bell Tolls (1943) - Soldier #3 (uncredited)
- Tiger Fangs (1943) - Takko
- Ali Baba and the Forty Thieves (1944) - Thief (uncredited)
- The Mask of Dimitrios (1944) - Turkish Morgue Attendant (uncredited)
- To Have and Have Not (1944) - Civilian (uncredited)
- The Conspirators (1944) - Fisherman (uncredited)
- The Picture of Dorian Gray (1945) - Barkeep (uncredited)
- South of the Rio Grande (1945) - Luis
- Perilous Holiday (1946) - Pedro (uncredited)
- Anna and the King of Siam (1946) - Guide (uncredited)
- California (1947) - Mexican Sheepherder (uncredited)
- The Homestretch (1947) - First Mate (uncredited)
- Trail of the Mounties (1947) - Trapper La Porte
- Secret Beyond the Door (1947) - Waiter (uncredited)
- French Leave (1948) - Seaman (uncredited)
- The Kissing Bandit (1948) - Esteban (uncredited)
- Mexican Hayride (1948) - Proprietor (uncredited)
- Viva Zapata! (1952) - Innocente (uncredited)
- Tonight We Sing (1953) - Greek (uncredited)
- Ride, Vaquero! (1953) - Comrade (uncredited)
- Killer Ape (1953) - Magi (uncredited)
- The Outsider (1961) - Mr. Sinta (uncredited)
- The Madmen of Mandoras (1963) - Presidente Juan Padua
- Alvarez Kelly (1966) - Mexican Manservant (uncredited)
- They Saved Hitler's Brain (1968) - Old Arab
- Justine (1969) - Aged Man (uncredited)
- Flap (1970) - She'll-Be-Back-Pretty-Soon
- Angel Unchained (1970) - Injun
