= June Duprez =

English actress (1918–1984)

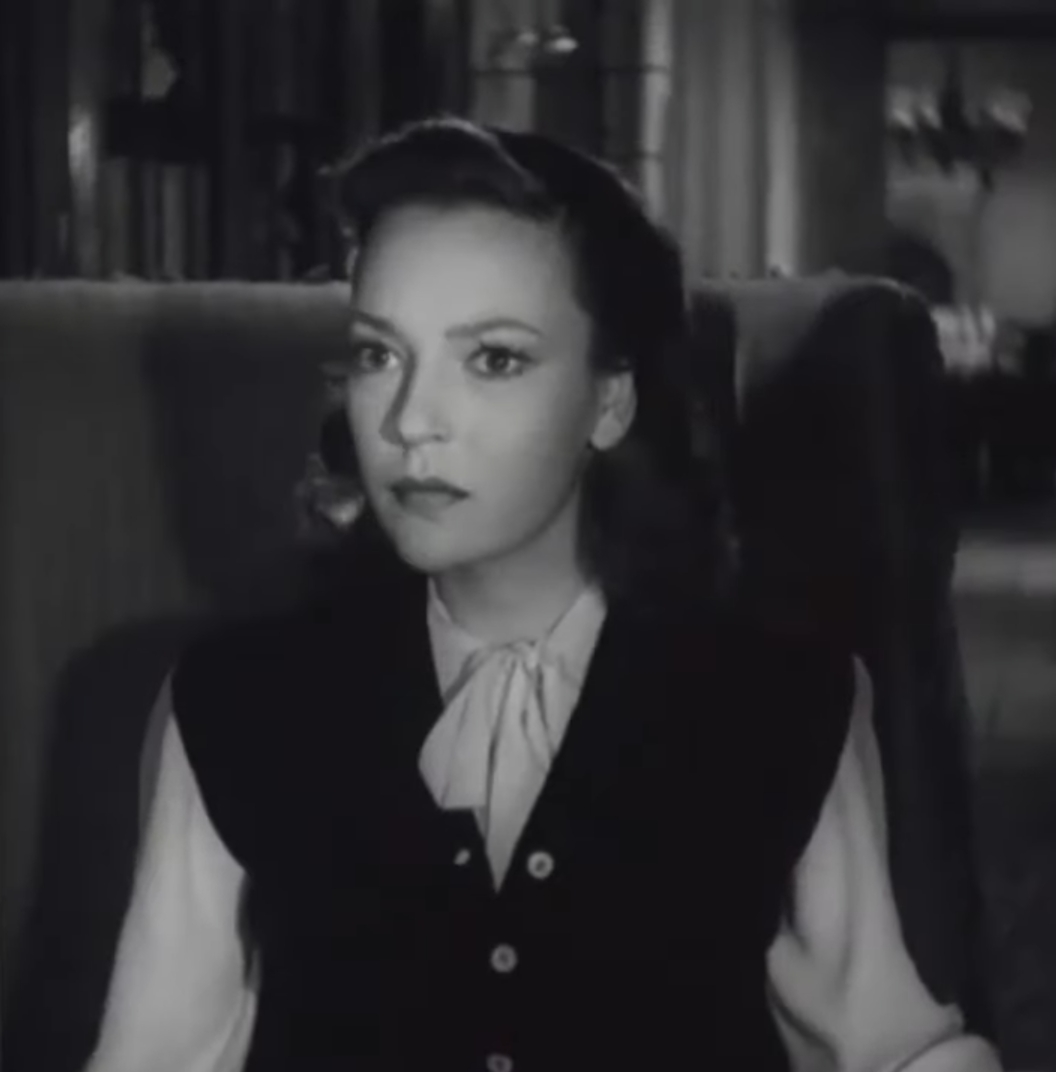
- Duprez in And Then There Were None (1945)
- Born: June Ada Rose Duprez; 14 May 1918; Teddington, Middlesex, England
- Died: 30 October 1984 (aged 66); London, England
- Occupation: Actress
- Years active: 1936–1948; 1961
- Spouses: Frederick Guy Beauchamp (m. 1935; div. 1942) George M. Moffett, Jr. (m. 1948; div. 1965)
- Children: 2
- Father: Fred Duprez

June Ada Rose Duprez (14 May 1918 – 30 October 1984) was an English film actress.

== Early life ==
Duprez was born in Teddington, Middlesex, England, during an air raid in the final months of World War I, the daughter of American comedian Fred Duprez and Australian Florence Isabelle Matthews.

== Career ==
She began acting in her adolescence with the Coventry Repertory Company after studying at the Froebel Institute, and appeared in The Crimson Circle in 1936. Her next film was The Cardinal (1936), and she had a small part in The Spy in Black (1939), but it was the adaptation of A.E.W. Mason's The Four Feathers (1939), that made her a film star. Her peak of success came with the fantasy film The Thief of Bagdad (1940), which she made for Alexander Korda's London Films (on locations in the United Kingdom, northern Africa, and the Grand Canyon in Arizona).

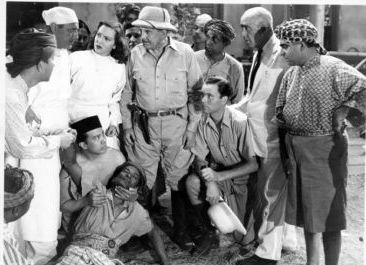
Film still for Tiger Fangs (1943), Frank Buck (centre), June Duprez on Frank Buck's right

Korda took charge of her career after this point and brought her to Hollywood, where he set her asking price at $50,000 per film. However, as Duprez had not yet achieved the level of popularity in the United States that she had in the United Kingdom, this tactic placed her out of contention for most roles. When she was released from Korda's contract, she appeared in low-budget fare, such as They Raid by Night (1942), Little Tokyo, U.S.A. (1942), and Tiger Fangs (1943). Clifford Odets' grim None But the Lonely Heart (1944), in which she co-starred with Cary Grant and Ethel Barrymore, started a brief return to films of higher production values. Duprez joined an ensemble cast in René Clair's film version of Agatha Christie's And Then There Were None (1945). The same year, she appeared opposite John Loder in The Brighton Strangler. In the Calcutta (1947), she starred with Alan Ladd, Gail Russell, and William Bendix.

After a few more motion pictures, Duprez moved to New York City for a brief career on and off Broadway. She appeared in "The Last Tycoon," an episode of the TV show Robert Montgomery Presents in 1951, and her final credited film performance was in One Plus One (1961), also titled Exploring the Kinsey Reports.

=== Music ===
Duprez composed "I Woke Up and Started Dreaming", a song that Bing Crosby's music company bought and published.

=== Radio ===
On 10 September 1944, Duprez starred in "Forever Walking Free," an episode of Silver Theater on CBS radio. She also starred in episodes of Suspense, 21 December 1944 entitled "The Brighton Strangler" and on 20 June 1946 entitled "Your Devoted Wife," also on CBS radio. She also replaced an ill Ida Lupino in Suspense episode “A Thing of Beauty” on 28 December 1944.

== Personal life and death ==
During World War II, after her father's death, Duprez and her mother lived in the U.S., where they were unable to access money they had in England. They sold or pawned jewels to stay afloat financially, and eventually Duprez sent her mother to Australia, where she had access to the British funds.

Duprez married Frederick Guy Beauchamp, a wealthy Harley Street doctor in 1935; they divorced in 1942 when his jealousy of her film stardom had eroded their marriage. She next married George Moffett, Jr., a wealthy sportsman, in October 1948. They had two daughters, and divorced in 1965.

Duprez lived in Rome for several years, then returned to London to live the remainder of her life in a flat in the affluent Knightsbridge area, having a close relationship with an English nobleman.

She died there after a long period of illness on 30 October 1984 at age 66 and was buried at Streatham Park Cemetery.

== Partial filmography ==
- The Amateur Gentleman (1936, uncredited)
- The Cardinal (1936) - Francesca Monterosa
- The Crimson Circle (1936) - Sylvia Hammond
- The Four Feathers (1939) - Ethne Burroughs
- The Spy in Black (1939) - Anne Burnett
- The Lion Has Wings (1939) - June
- The Thief of Bagdad (1940) - Princess
- They Raid by Night (1942) - Inga Beckering
- Little Tokyo, U.S.A. (1942) - Teru
- Forever and a Day (1943) - Julia Trimble-Pomfret
- Don Winslow of the Coast Guard (1943) - Tasmia
- Tiger Fangs (1943) - Linda MacCardle
- None but the Lonely Heart (1944) - Ada Brantline
- The Brighton Strangler (1945) - April Manby Carson
- And Then There Were None (1945) - Vera Claythorne
- That Brennan Girl (1946) - Natalie Brennan
- Calcutta (1947) - Marina Tanev
- One Plus One (1961) - Margaret Gaylord - segment: "Average Man"
