= Michael St. Angel =

American actor (1916–1984)

- The Brighton Strangler (1945)
- Born: October 9, 1916; Rockford, Illinois, United States
- Died: January 13, 1984 (aged 67); Los Angeles, California; United States
- Other names: Steve Flagg, Michael Hawks
- Occupation: Actor
- Years active: 1943–1974
- Spouse: Marjorie Holiday (1945-1969; her death)

Michael St. Angel (1916–1984) was an American film actor.

== Biography ==
Second lead and featured actor Michael St. Angel was born in Rockford, Illinois in 1916, to Jasper and Giacomina St. Angel, the son of a prominent real estate businessman and community leader. Following high school, the darkly handsome youth attended Wisconsin's Beloit College majoring in drama, then later transferred to Iowa's St. Ambrose College where he became a drama teacher after receiving his degree.

Deciding to pursue acting professionally, he left his teaching post after only a couple of years and returned to Wisconsin where he joined up with the Belfry Players and traveled the country in stock shows. He eventually made it to New York and in July 1942 made his Broadway debut in the small role of a soldier in The Cat Screams. The show closed four days later. Two months later he was cast in the much more successful comedy "Janie," which ran well over a year.

A Warner Bros. talent scout picked up on Michael's dark, wavy-haired good looks and convinced him to travel West to audition for the lead role of George Gershwin in the biopic Rhapsody in Blue (1945). The part went to Robert Alda, however, and he was about to return to NY when a meeting with RKO Pictures resulted in a contract.

Michael started out inauspiciously in tiny parts starting out with the film Gangway for Tomorrow (1943). Following a couple of other obscure bits, he secured more visible roles in Bride by Mistake (1944) and Marine Raiders (1944), which led to the romantic co-starring role opposite Elaine Riley in the Leon Errol comedy starrer What a Blonde (1945). Michael showed enough promise from this to be cast as the second lead role in the thriller The Brighton Strangler (1945) which toplines John Loder as an actor dangerously obsessed by the title role he plays on stage.

Michael married Fox singer/dancer Marjorie Holliday in 1945. After the birth of their son Jasper Michael, in 1951, she abandoned her career for family obligations. But Michael's film career already went into a steep decline as quickly as it peaked. Before he knew it, he found himself back to minor roles in such films as First Yank Into Tokyo (1945), a loanout to Republic Pictures The Madonna's Secret (1946) and back to RKO for The Truth About Murder (1946). Over his objections, RKO changed his marquee name to "Steven Flagg" to give his career a boost but little changed. Under this name he found work with former co-star Leon Errol in several of the star's short films. Producer Howard Hughes kept Michael under contract despite his lack of stature and following a few parts in such films as Easy Living (1949), Flying Leathernecks (1951), The Pace That Thrills (1952) and The French Line (1953), he was dropped.

Quickly switching his stage name back to his real name, Michael moved increasingly towards TV work. One opportunity in 1957 to star as TV detective Mike Hammer fell through. Outside of acting, to make ends meet, Michael worked for producer Howard Hughes over at TWA at one point and also served as a personal assistant to his old friend, columnist Walter Winchell.

In the next couple of decades only occasional small acting roles came his way both on film What Ever Happened to Baby Jane? (1962), 4 for Texas (1963), Dead Heat on a Merry-Go-Round (1966), The Love Machine (1971)) and TV (The Gale Storm Show, The Untouchables, The Virginian, Love, American Style, The Magician).

Following wife Marjorie's sudden death at age 48 in 1969 of a cerebral hemorrhage, Michael ventured on in the restaurant business as owner and manager of his last eatery, Michael's Los Feliz. He died in 1984 at age 67 at the Motion Picture and Television Hospital survived by his son.

== Partial filmography ==
- Gangway for Tomorrow (1943) - Jim Johnson - Mechanic
- The Falcon Out West (1944) - Nightclub Patron (uncredited)
- Seven Days Ashore (1944) - Marine (uncredited)
- Marine Raiders (1944) - Lt. Sherwood
- Bride by Mistake (1944) - Lt. Stephen Corey
- What a Blonde (1945) - Andrew Kent
- The Brighton Strangler (1945) - Lt. Bob Carson
- First Yank into Tokyo (1945) - Capt. Andrew Kent
- The Madonna's Secret (1946) - Hunt Mason
- The Truth About Murder (1946) - Hank
- The Velvet Touch (1948) - Jimmy
- Race Street (1948) - Clerk (uncredited)
- Bodyguard (1948) - Kelly - Reporter (uncredited)
- Easy Living (1949) - Gilbert Vollmer
- A Dangerous Profession (1949) - Roberts, Law Firm Receptionist (uncredited)
- Hit Parade of 1951 (1950) - Chuck
- Operation Pacific (1951) - Lt. Jorgenson (uncredited)
- Million Dollar Pursuit (1951) - Police Lieut. Matt Whitcomb
- Flying Leathernecks (1951) - Capt. Harold Jorgensen, Ops. Officer
- The Las Vegas Story (1952) - Mitch - Deputy (uncredited)
- The Pace That Thrills (1952) - Chris Rhodes
- One Minute to Zero (1952) - Lt. Martin (uncredited)
- Affair with a Stranger (1953) - Frank - Actor (uncredited)
- The French Line (1953) - George Hodges
- Man Trap (1961) - Murray, Party Guest (uncredited)
- The George Raft Story (1961) - Mustached Patron (uncredited)
- Whatever Happened to Baby Jane? (1962) - Bank Manager (uncredited)
- Critic's Choice (1963) - Actor, Jimmy in 'Week End' (uncredited)
- Black Zoo (1963) - Officer Donovan (uncredited)
- 4 For Texas (1963) - Williams
- Looking for Love (1964) - Bistro Owner (uncredited)
- Dead Heat on a Merry-Go-Round (1966) - Captain William Yates
- The Cool Ones (1967) - Director (uncredited)
- Doctors' Wives (1971) - Doctor (uncredited)
- The Love Machine (1971) - Agency Man (uncredited)
