= Little Tokyo, U.S.A. =

1942 film by Otto Brower

- Film poster
- Directed by: Otto Brower
- Written by: George Bricker (story)
- Produced by: Bryan Foy
- Starring: Preston Foster; Brenda Joyce
- Cinematography: Joseph MacDonald
- Edited by: Harry Reynolds
- Music by: Emil Newman
- Color process: Black and white
- Production company: Twentieth Century Fox
- Distributed by: Twentieth Century-Fox Film Corp.
- Release date: August 14, 1942
- Running time: 64 minutes
- Country: United States
- Language: English

Little Tokyo, U.S.A. is a 1942 American film. Produced in the period just after the United States entered World War II, it was meant to alert Americans to the dangers of foreign agents. It is now controversial for its largely negative portrayal of Japanese-Americans.

== Plot ==
The story, set in late 1941, follows Los Angeles cop Michael Steele (Preston Foster) as he investigates a series of crimes involving the local Japanese-American community.

The story gradually reveals that the crimes are to cover up a Japanese-American cabal's efforts to facilitate Japan's bombing of Pearl Harbor. After the horrific military attack, the Japanese-American community's demonstrations of loyalty to America are portrayed as patently insincere. Policeman Steele follows the crime trail to an American-born spy for Tokyo, Takimura (played in yellowface by Harold Huber). Takimura tries to throw Steele off the case by enlisting a neighborhood vixen, Teru (June Duprez) to seduce him.

Teru invites Mike to Satsuma's house, where she drugs him. As Mike sleeps, Hendricks and Takimura kill Teru and make it look as if Mike murdered her while trying to assault her. Mike is arrested for the murder, and the next morning is in prison when he learns of the Japanese attack on Pearl Harbor. Mike then escapes from jail and soon discovers where Takimura, Hendricks and the others meet. With Maris' help, Mike tricks the spies into revealing their activities while the police listen, and soon the gang is rounded up. After Japanese-Americans on the West Coast are taken to internment camps, Little Tokyo becomes a ghost town.

The movie ends extolling the necessity for the internment, with Maris commenting on her radio show that loyal Japanese-Americans must suffer along with the disloyal in the interest of national security. She then reads an excerpt from Robert Nathan's poem "Watch America," and urges Americans to maintain their vigilance against espionage.

== Cast ==
- Preston Foster as Michael Steel
- Harold Huber as Ito Takamura
- June Duprez as Teru
- Abner Biberman as Satsuma
- Brenda Joyce as Maris Hanover
- Don Douglas as Hendricks
- George E. Stone as Kingoro
- Charles Tannen as Marsten
- Frank Orth as Jerry
- Edward Soo Hoo as Suma
- Beal Wong as Shadow
- Emory Parnell as Slavin

== Controversy ==
Filmed in the months immediately following Pearl Harbor, Twentieth Century Fox's Little Tokyo U.S.A. was termed "63 minutes' worth of speculation about prewar Japanese espionage activities" by The New York Times.

The movie used a quasi-documentary style of filming. Twentieth Century Fox sent its cameramen to the Japanese quarter of Los Angeles to shoot the actual evacuation. However, after the evacuation, night shots were difficult in the deserted "Little Tokyo". Night scenes were filmed in Chinatown in Los Angeles instead.

== See also ==
- Racism in Film of the United States
- Yellow Peril
- Japanese American internment
- United States Office of War Information
