= Billy the Kid (1941 film) =

1941 film

- Theatrical poster
- Directed by: David Miller
- Written by: Gene Fowler; Howard Emmett Rogers; Bradbury Foote
- Based on: The Saga of Billy the Kid by Walter Noble Burns
- Produced by: Irving Asher
- Starring: Robert Taylor; Brian Donlevy; Gene Lockhart; Lon Chaney Jr.
- Cinematography: William V. Skall; Leonard Smith
- Edited by: Robert J. Kern
- Music by: David Snell
- Production company: Metro-Goldwyn-Mayer
- Distributed by: Loew's, Inc.
- Release date: May 30, 1941
- Running time: 94 minutes
- Country: United States
- Language: English
- Budget: $1,411,000
- Box office: $2,432,000

Billy the Kid is a 1941 American Western film, a color remake of the 1930 film of the same name. The film features Robert Taylor as Billy and Brian Donlevy as a fictionalized version of Pat Garrett renamed "Jim Sherwood" in the film. Directed by David Miller and based on the book by Walter Noble Burns, the cast also included Gene Lockhart and Lon Chaney Jr. The film was not as well received as the 1930 original, Billy the Kid, which had starred Johnny Mack Brown and Wallace Beery and been shot in an experimental widescreen process.

== Plot ==
The year is 1880 and William Bonney is already a famous gunslinger, known as "Billy the Kid". In Lincoln, New Mexico, Billy helps his friend Pedro Gonzales escape from jail, where he was put by mean sheriff Cass McAndrews.

Later, Billy and Pedro go back to a saloon from which Pedro was thrown out earlier by the locals because of his ethnicity. One of the cattle barons, Dan Hickey, recognizes Billy and hires him to scare up some farmers into joining Hickey's business. Billy and the rest of Hickey's men start a stampede among the farmers' cattle, wreaking havoc and creating chaos. A farmer is killed during the stampede, and afterwards Billy feels guilty of what he has done.

During the stampede, Billy encounters one of his childhood friends, Jim Sherwood, who works for a man named Eric Keating. Jim arranges for Billy and Pedro to come and work for the non-violent Keating instead of the violent Hickey.

At the Keating ranch, Billy meets Eric's beautiful sister Edith and is instantly attracted to her. He finds himself well at home at the ranch, until Pedro is shot in the back and killed by one of Hickey's men. Keating convinces Billy not to take revenge, but to wait until he has talked to the governor about the violent situation in the region.

However, Keating doesn't return from his visit to the governor. At Edith's birthday party, Keating's horse comes back with an empty saddle. Billy decides to go after Hickey and his men to seek justice. When Hickey finds out about Keating's men coming for him, he tries to make them change their minds by sending them a messenger who lies and tells them that Keating died while trying to get away from the sheriff. Keating's men doesn't buy the lie, so Hickey tries to stall them with negotiations, while sending for reinforcements.

After talking to Hickey, Jim seems to have switched sides, telling the sheriff to lock up Billy and another one of Keating's men, Tim Ward. He says it's for their own protection, but Billy doesn't believe him.

Hickey tries to make the sheriff shoot Billy and say that he was trying to escape from jail, but Ward manages to disarm the sheriff, and later Billy kills him, thinking he is still trying to kill them.

Billy and Ward track down the men who killed Keating and shoots them one by one. When they are all dead, Jim and Hickey turns up. Jim tries to stop Billy from shooting Hickey, but when Hickey flees the scene Billy shoots him in the back.

The story ends with Billy challenging his old friend Jim, but he has shifted hands and is now using his right hand to draw instead of his usual quick left. Because of this, Jim is faster and kills Billy, and afterwards Jim realizes that Billy shifted hands deliberately and let him win.

== Cast ==
- Robert Taylor as Billy the Kid
- Brian Donlevy as Jim Sherwood
- Ian Hunter as Eric Keating
- Mary Howard as Edith Keating
- Gene Lockhart as Dan Hickey
- Lon Chaney Jr. as 'Spike' Hudson
- Henry O'Neill as Tim Ward
- Guinn Williams as Ed Bronson
- Cy Kendall as Cass McAndrews, sheriff
- Ted Adams as "Buz" Cobb
- Frank Conlan as Judge Blake
- Frank Puglia as Pedro Gonzales

== Music ==
Ormond B. Ruthven and Albert Mannheimer wrote the song "Viva La Vida" for the film.

== Production ==
Parts of the film were shot in Monument Valley.

Both Taylor and Donlevy were ten years older than the real Billy and Pat were in 1880, the year the film begins.

== Box office ==
According to MGM records the film earned $1,518,000 in the US and Canada and $914,000 elsewhere resulting in a profit of $41,000.

== See also ==
- Billy the Kid (1989 film)
