= Norman Budd =

American actor

- Born: 27 January 1914; Liverpool, Lancashire, United Kingdom
- Died: 10 September 2006 (aged 92); Los Angeles, California; United States
- Occupation: Actor
- Years active: 1931–1953 (film)

Norman Budd (27 January 1914 – 10 September 2006) was a British-born actor in American films and television. He also acted on stage.

== Selected filmography ==
- The Cave Dwellers (1940)
- The Gamblers (1949)
- The Judge (1949)
- The Red Menace (1949)
- Women from Headquarters (1950)
- Million Dollar Pursuit (1951)
- Tropical Heat Wave (1952)
- The Atomic City (1952)
- The Adventures of Superman (1952)

== Bibliography ==
- Len D. Martin. The Republic Pictures Checklist: Features, Serials, Cartoons, Short Subjects and Training Films of Republic Pictures Corporation, 1935-1959. McFarland, 1998.
