= Arno Frey =

German actor (1900–1961)

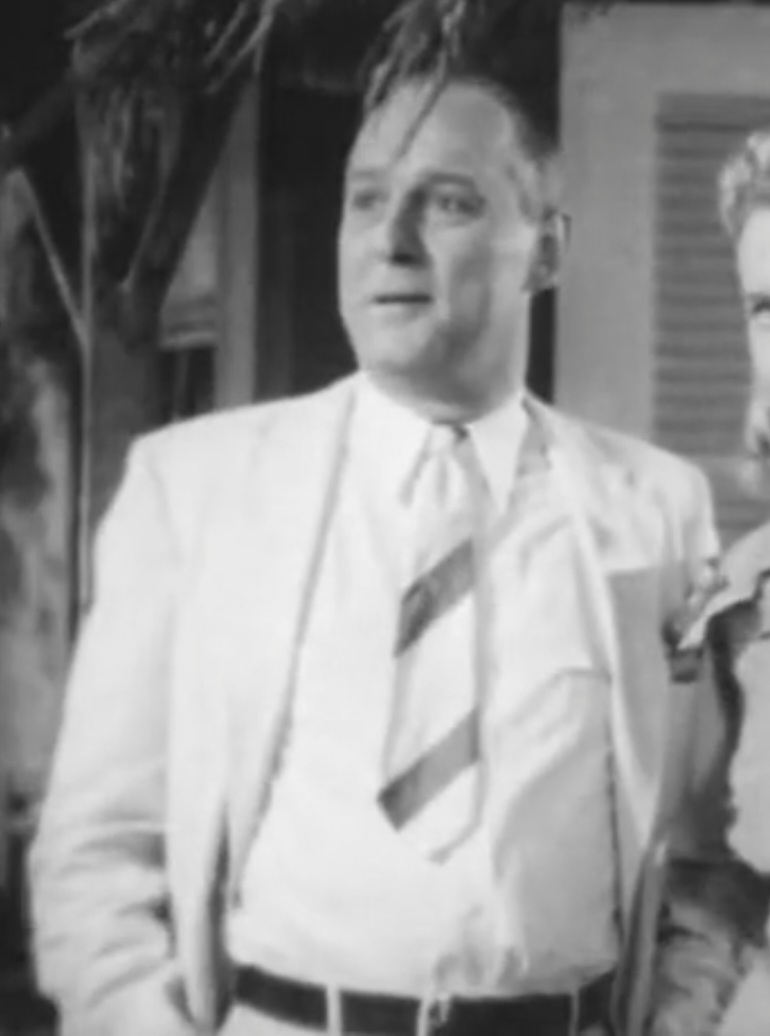
- Frey in Jungle Siren (1942)
- Born: Arnold Frey; 11 October 1900; Munich, Germany
- Died: 26 June 1961 (aged 60); Los Angeles, California, U.S.
- Resting place: Forest Lawn Memorial Park, Hollywood Hills, California
- Occupation: Actor
- Years active: 1928–1953
- Spouse: Chis Marie Frey

Arnold Frey (11 October 1900 – 26 June 1961) was a German actor who portrayed the Nazi villain Dr. Lang in the Frank Buck movie Tiger Fangs (1943).

== Biography ==
Frey arrived in the United States in October 1926, according to the New York passenger manifest for the S/S Muenchen, and became a naturalized citizen August 23, 1940. He acted in more than 90 movies. Besides his role in Tiger Fangs he is known today for his roles in Man Hunt (1941), The Valley of Vanishing Men (1942), Hangmen Also Die (1943), The Adventures of Rusty (1945), Secret Agent X-9, the 1945 version of this Universal Serial, and 13 Rue Madeleine.

He died in Los Angeles California. His remains are interred at Forest Lawn Memorial Park in Hollywood Hills, California.

== Selected filmography ==
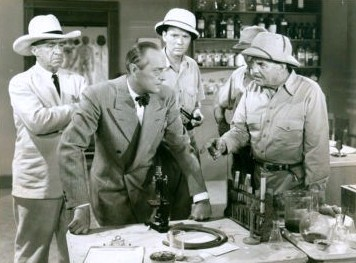
Movie still for Tiger Fangs, J. Farrell MacDonald (left), Arno Frey (center), Frank Buck (right)

- The Awakening (1928) - (uncredited)
- The Mask Falls (1931)
- Best of Enemies (1933) - Emil
- Hell in the Heavens (1934) - Baron Kurt von Hagen
- Mystery Woman (1935) - Schultz
- Rendezvous (1935) - Army Officer (uncredited)
- 15 Maiden Lane (1936) - Diamond Cutter's Son (uncredited)
- Thin Ice (1937) - Baron's Secretary (uncredited)
- Charlie Chan at the Olympics (1937) - Carlos (uncredited)
- Lancer Spy (1937) - Soldier (uncredited)
- The Great Waltz (1938) - Musician (uncredited)
- Midnight (1939) - Hotel Desk Clerk at Ritz (uncredited)
- Never Say Die (1939) - Assistant Chemist (uncredited)
- Boy Friend (1939) - Headwaiter (uncredited)
- Espionage Agent (1939) - Foreign Officer (uncredited)
- Hollywood Cavalcade (1939) - Maitre d'Hotel (uncredited)
- Pack Up Your Troubles (1939) - German (uncredited)
- City in Darkness (1939) - Pilot (uncredited)
- The Honeymoon's Over (1939) - Captain (uncredited)
- The Fighting 69th (1940) - German Officer (uncredited)
- British Intelligence (1940) - German Junior Officer (uncredited)
- Escape to Glory (1940) - Submarine Gunner
- Earthbound (1940) - Maitre d'Hotel (uncredited)
- Four Sons (1940) - German Officer (uncredited)
- The Man I Married (1940) - German Broadcaster (uncredited)
- Arizona Gang Busters (1940) - Carl Schmidt
- Yesterday's Heroes (1940) - Waiter (uncredited)
- Escape (1940) - Concentration Camp Commandant (uncredited)
- The Great American Broadcast (1941) - Waiter (uncredited)
- Man Hunt (1941) - Police Lieutenant
- Moon Over Miami (1941) - Wine Steward (uncredited)
- Underground (1941) - Guard (uncredited)
- Sergeant York (1941) - German Soldier (uncredited)
- We Go Fast (1941) - Headwaiter (uncredited)
- Two-Faced Woman (1941) - Waiter (uncredited)
- H.M. Pulham, Esq. (1941) - German Captain (uncredited)
- Paris Calling (1941) - Watchman (uncredited)
- Texas Man Hunt (1942) - Otto Reuther
- My Favorite Blonde (1942) - Male Nurse (uncredited)
- The Wife Takes a Flyer (1942) - German Officer (uncredited)
- Pacific Rendezvous (1942) - German (uncredited)
- Jungle Siren (1942) - Herr George Lukas
- Berlin Correspondent (1942) - Censor (uncredited)
- Just Off Broadway (1942) - Headwaiter (uncredited)
- Desperate Journey (1942) - Pvt. Trocha (uncredited)
- Girl Trouble (1942) - Anton (uncredited)
- Once Upon a Honeymoon (1942) - German Officer (uncredited)
- Valley of Hunted Men (1942) - Counsel Von Breckner
- The Valley of Vanishing Men (1942, Serial) - Col. Engler
- Reunion in France (1942) - Guide (uncredited)
- The Adventures of Smilin' Jack (1943, Serial) - Nazi Agent [Ch. 5] (uncredited)
- Chetniks! The Fighting Guerrillas (1943) - Gestapo Officer (uncredited)
- Hangmen Also Die (1943) - Camp Lt. Itnut
- Tonight We Raid Calais (1943) - German Soldier (uncredited)
- They Came to Blow Up America (1943) - Kranz' Aide
- Action in the North Atlantic (1943) - German Pilot (uncredited)
- Appointment in Berlin (1943) - Gestapo Captain (uncredited)
- Bomber's Moon (1943) - German Captain (uncredited)
- First Comes Courage (1943) - Sergeant (uncredited)
- Adventures of the Flying Cadets (1943) - Sub U-47 Captain [Ch. 6] (uncredited)
- Tiger Fangs (1943) - Dr. Lang
- Paris After Dark (1943) - German Detective (uncredited)
- The Cross of Lorraine (1943) - Elite Guard (uncredited)
- Northern Pursuit (1943) - Submarine Captain (uncredited)
- Around the World (1943) - German (uncredited)
- None Shall Escape (1944) - German Officer (uncredited)
- Tampico (1944) - Navigator (uncredited)
- Broadway Rhythm (1944) - Waiter (uncredited)
- Address Unknown (1944) - German (uncredited)
- U-Boat Prisoner (1944) - U-Boat Officer Hagemann (uncredited)
- Wilson (1944) - German Delegate (uncredited)
- The Conspirators (1944) - General's Attache (uncredited)
- Jungle Queen (1945, Serial) - German Officer (uncredited)
- Hotel Berlin (1945) - Officer (uncredited)
- A Royal Scandal (1945) - Captain (uncredited)
- Son of Lassie (1945) - German Officer (uncredited)
- Counter-Attack (1945) - German Officer at Telephone (uncredited)
- Thrill of a Romance (1945) - Hotel Headwaiter (uncredited)
- Where Do We Go from Here? (1945) - German Lieutenant (uncredited)
- Secret Agent X-9 (1945, Serial) - Kapitan Grut
- Adventures of Rusty (1945) - Tausig
- Week-End at the Waldorf (1945) - Starlight Roof Maitre d'Hotel (uncredited)
- Abbott and Costello in Hollywood (1945) - Waiter (uncredited)
- Paris Underground (1945) - German Officer (uncredited)
- Rendezvous 24 (1946) - Kutner (uncredited)
- The Searching Wind (1946) - German Guard (uncredited)
- Cloak and Dagger (1946) - German Soldier (uncredited)
- No Leave, No Love (1946) - Waiter (uncredited)
- 13 Rue Madeleine (1946) - German Officer (uncredited)
- The Beginning or the End (1947) - Nazi Official (uncredited)
- Golden Earrings (1947) - Major (uncredited)
- This Time for Keeps (1947) - Headwaiter (uncredited)
- Cass Timberlane (1947) - Waiter at Country Club (uncredited)
- Women in the Night (1948) - Field Marshall Von Runzel
- The Noose Hangs High (1948) - Headwaiter (uncredited)
- In a Lonely Place (1950) - Joe (uncredited)
- For Heaven's Sake (1950) - Headwaiter (uncredited)
- Invitation (1952) - Clerk (uncredited)
- What Price Glory (1952) - German Officer (uncredited)
- Call Me Madam (1953) - Butler (uncredited)
- The Desert Rats (1953) - Kramm (uncredited)

== Bibliography ==
Lehrer, Steven (2006). Bring 'Em Back Alive: The Best of Frank Buck. Texas Tech University press. p. 248. ISBN 0-89672-582-0.
