= Dan Seymour =

American character actor

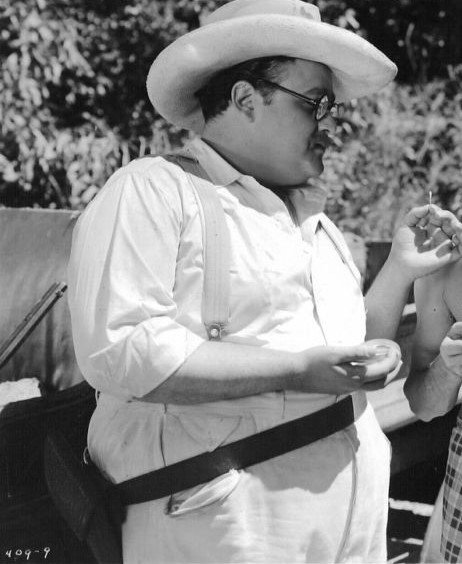
- Seymour in Tiger Fangs (1943)
- Born: Daniel Seymour Katz; February 22, 1915; Chicago, Illinois, U.S.
- Died: May 25, 1993 (aged 78); Santa Monica, California, U.S.
- Education: University of Chicago
- Occupation: Actor
- Years active: 1940–1978
- Spouse: Evelyn Schwartz (m. 1949)
- Children: 2

Dan Seymour (born Daniel Seymour Katz; February 22, 1915 – May 25, 1993) was an American character actor who frequently played villains in Warner Bros. films. He appeared in several Humphrey Bogart films, including To Have and Have Not (1944) and Key Largo (1948).

== Early life ==
Seymour was born on February 22, 1915, a native of Chicago, Illinois. He attended Senn High School in Chicago and graduated from the University of Chicago with a B.S. in Fine Arts.

== Career ==
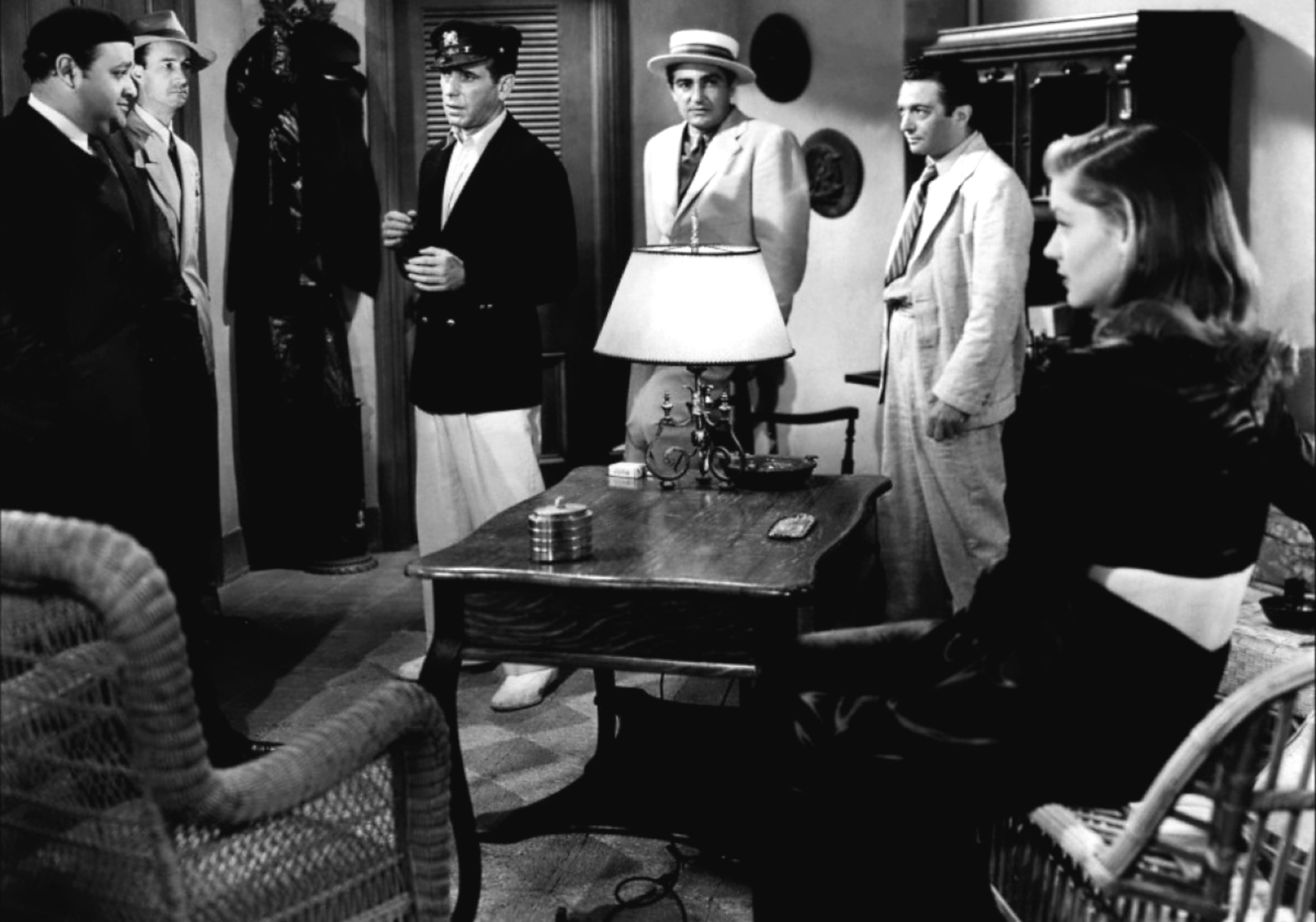
From left to right: Dan Seymour, Aldo Nadi, Humphrey Bogart, Sheldon Leonard, Marcel Dalio and Lauren Bacall in To Have and Have Not (1944)

Seymour worked in burlesque as a song-and-dance man and worked at night as an emcee in New York night clubs. He moved to Hollywood, where his large build made him suitable to be cast for roles as dubious characters. After 16 months of dieting and swimming, his weight dropped to 244 pounds in 1946 having lost 100 pounds.

He played Vichy French Captain Renard, in To Have and Have Not (1944), the adversary of Humphrey Bogart's character. In Key Largo (1948), he again played opposite Bogart as one of the henchmen of Johnny Rocco (Edward G. Robinson). In the motion picture Mara Maru (1952), he played opposite Raymond Burr and Errol Flynn.

He later appeared in seven episodes of Perry Mason, which starred Burr; the episodes spanned the entire nine-year run of the popular series. During the first season in 1957, he played Harry Marlow in "The Case of the Silent Partner." In the final season in 1965, he played Nappy Tyler in "The Case of the Carefree Coronary." He made four appearances in The Untouchables, and three on Adventures of Superman. He performed on the radio anthology series Mollé Mystery Theatre and later on many television series. He appeared as the Maharajah of Nimpah in two episodes of the 1966 Batman series credited as "Dan Seymore".

== Personal life ==
He married Evelyn Schwartz in 1949. They had two children: Jeff, born in 1950, and Greg, born in 1954.

== Death ==
On May 25, 1993, Seymour died in St. John's Medical Center two months after suffering a stroke in Santa Monica, California, aged 78. He was buried at Hillside Memorial Park in Culver City, California.

== Partial filmography ==
- Bombs over Burma (1942) - Pete Brogranza
- Cairo (1942) - Fat Doorman in Cairo Theatre (uncredited)
- The Talk of the Town (1942) - Headwaiter at Nightclub (uncredited)
- Road to Morocco (1942) - Slave-Buyer (uncredited)
- Casablanca (1942) - Abdul (uncredited)
- Mug Town (1942) - Chef (uncredited)
- Tahiti Honey (1943) - Fats
- Rhythm of the Islands (1943) - Native Guard
- Hit the Ice (1943) - Resort Chef (uncredited)
- Tiger Fangs (1943) - Henry Gratz
- Klondike Kate (1943) - Harry - Piano Player
- Kismet (1944) - Fat Turk at the Cafe (uncredited)
- Rainbow Island (1944) - Fat Native Man (uncredited)
- To Have and Have Not (1944) - Capt. M. Renard
- Brazil (1944) - King of the Carnival (uncredited)
- It's in the Bag! (1945) - Fatso (uncredited)
- Guest Wife (1945) - Turkish customer (uncredited)
- The Spanish Main (1945) - Jailer (uncredited)
- Confidential Agent (1945) - Mr. Muckerji
- San Antonio (1945) - Laredo Border Guard (uncredited)
- A Night in Casablanca (1946) - Prefect of Police
- The Searching Wind (1946) - Torrone
- Cloak and Dagger (1946) - Marsoli
- Philo Vance's Gamble (1947) - Jeffrey Connor
- Hard Boiled Mahoney (1947) - Dr. Armand
- Slave Girl (1947) - Telek - Tuareg Chieftain
- Intrigue (1947) - Karidian
- Key Largo (1948) - Angel Garcia
- Johnny Belinda (1948) - Pacquet - Storekeeper
- Highway 13 (1948) - Kelleher (uncredited)
- Trail of the Yukon (1949) - Tom Laroux
- Reign of Terror (1949) - Innkeeper (uncredited)
- Young Man with a Horn (1950) - Mike (uncredited)
- Abbott and Costello in the Foreign Legion (1950) - Josef (uncredited)
- Joe Palooka in the Squared Circle (1950) - Charlie Crawford
- Sirocco (1951) - Wealthy Syrian (uncredited)
- The Blue Veil (1951) - Pelt
- Rancho Notorious (1952) - Comanche Paul
- Mara Maru (1952) - Lt. Zuenon
- Glory Alley (1952) - Sal Nichols (The Pig)
- Face to Face (1952) - Drummer ('The Bride Comes to Yellow Sky')
- The Adventures of Superman (1952)
- Tangier Incident (1953) - Police Inspector Rabat
- The System (1953) - Mr. Marty
- Second Chance (1953) - Felipe
- The Big Heat (1953) - Mr. Atkins
- Human Desire (1954) - Duggan - Bartender (uncredited)
- Abbott and Costello Meet the Mummy (1955) - Josef
- Moonfleet (1955) - Hull
- Beyond a Reasonable Doubt (1956) - Greco
- The Buster Keaton Story (1957) - Indian Chief
- Undersea Girl (1957) - Police Lt. Mike Travis
- The Sad Sack (1957) - Arab Chieftain (uncredited)
- Watusi (1959) - Mohamet
- Return of the Fly (1959) - Max Barthold
- Unholy Rollers (1972) - Used Car Dealer
- The Way We Were (1973) - Guest
- Centerfold Girls (1974) - Proprietor
- The Manhandlers (1974) - Vito
- Escape to Witch Mountain (1975) - Psychic
