= Best of Enemies (1933 film) =

1933 film by Rian James

- Film poster
- Directed by: Rian James
- Screenplay by: Sam Mintz; Rian James
- Story by: Sam Mintz
- Starring: Charles "Buddy" Rogers; Marian Nixon; Frank Morgan; Greta Nissen; Joseph Cawthorn; Arno Frey
- Cinematography: L. William O'Connell
- Edited by: Margaret Clancey
- Production company: Fox Film Corporation
- Distributed by: Fox Film Corporation
- Release date: June 23, 1933
- Running time: 72 minutes
- Country: United States
- Language: English

Best of Enemies is a 1933 American pre-Code comedy film directed by Rian James and written by Sam Mintz and Rian James. The film stars Charles "Buddy" Rogers, Marian Nixon, Frank Morgan, Greta Nissen, Joseph Cawthorn and Arno Frey. The film was released on June 23, 1933, by Fox Film Corporation.

== Cast ==
- Charles "Buddy" Rogers as Jimmie Hartman
- Marian Nixon as Lena Schneider
- Frank Morgan as William Hartman
- Greta Nissen as The Blonde
- Joseph Cawthorn as Gus Schneider
- Arno Frey as Emil
- W. E. Lawrence as August
- Anders Van Haden as Professor Herman
