= The Pace That Thrills (1952 film) =

1952 American action film

- Directed by: Leon Barsha
- Written by: Robert Lee Johnson; DeVallon Scott
- Produced by: Lewis J. Rachmil
- Starring: Bill Williams; Carla Balenda; Robert Armstrong; Frank McHugh; Michael St. Angel
- Cinematography: Frank Redman
- Edited by: Samuel E. Beetley
- Music by: C. Bakaleinikoff
- Production company: RKO Pictures
- Distributed by: RKO Pictures
- Release date: March 21, 1952
- Running time: 63 minutes
- Country: United States
- Language: English

The Pace That Thrills is a 1952 American action film directed by Leon Barsha and written by Robert Lee Johnson and DeVallon Scott. The film stars Bill Williams, Carla Balenda, Robert Armstrong, Frank McHugh and Michael St. Angel. The film was released on March 21, 1952, by RKO Pictures.

== Plot ==
Los Angeles newspaper reporter Eve Drake is assigned to cover a motorcycle race. There she sees Dusty Weston win a race using questionable tactics. She is asked to present the winner's trophy afterward, but when Dusty plants a kiss on her, she slaps his face.

Eve's critical article irks Dusty and his employer, J.C. Barton, who owns a motorcycle factory. At a home belonging to his mechanic pal Rocket Anderson, they discuss Eve with rival cyclist Chris Rhodes, another friend. Chris suggests softening her up and invites Eve to pay another visit. She enjoys a cycle ride until Chris and Dusty try to elude two motorcycle police officers and crash into a ditch.

Chris then suffers a leg injury in a race after Dusty's dangerous maneuver. Dusty is fired, after which Chris is given a new hydraulic bike to race that Barton needs to be a success if he is going to be able to keep his factory up and running. Chris protests that Dusty is the better rider and could win the big race on the new bike. Barton refuses to budge, and while Dusty takes a job as a trick rider for a carnival.

Chris falls in love with Eve, but she's romantically attracted to Dusty and unsure what to do. Chris punches him when Dusty says they intend to marry. Dusty then surprisingly enters the big race, competing against Chris and the new Barton bike. At the last minute, when Chris takes a spill, Dusty deliberately does the same, giving Chris a chance to get back up and be victorious. A grateful Chris congratulates his friend and Eve on their engagement.

== Cast ==
- Bill Williams as Richard L. 'Dusty' Weston
- Carla Balenda as Eve Drake
- Robert Armstrong as J.C. Barton
- Frank McHugh as Rocket Anderson
- Michael St. Angel as Chris Rhodes
- Cleo Moore as Ruby
- John Mitchum as Blackie Meyers
- Diane Garrett as Opal
- John Hamilton as Sour Puss
- Claudia Drake as Pearl
