= Easy Living (1949 film) =

1949 film

- Theatrical release poster
- Directed by: Jacques Tourneur
- Screenplay by: Charles Schnee
- Based on: Education of the Heart by Irwin Shaw
- Produced by: Robert Sparks
- Starring: Victor Mature; Lucille Ball; Lizabeth Scott; Sonny Tufts; Lloyd Nolan
- Cinematography: Harry J. Wild
- Edited by: Frederic Knudtson
- Music by: Roy Webb
- Production company: RKO Radio Pictures
- Distributed by: RKO Radio Pictures
- Release date: October 8, 1949
- Running time: 77 minutes
- Country: United States
- Language: English

Easy Living is a 1949 American drama film directed by Jacques Tourneur, starring Victor Mature, Lucille Ball and Lizabeth Scott. The film features the real-life Los Angeles Rams football team.

== Plot ==
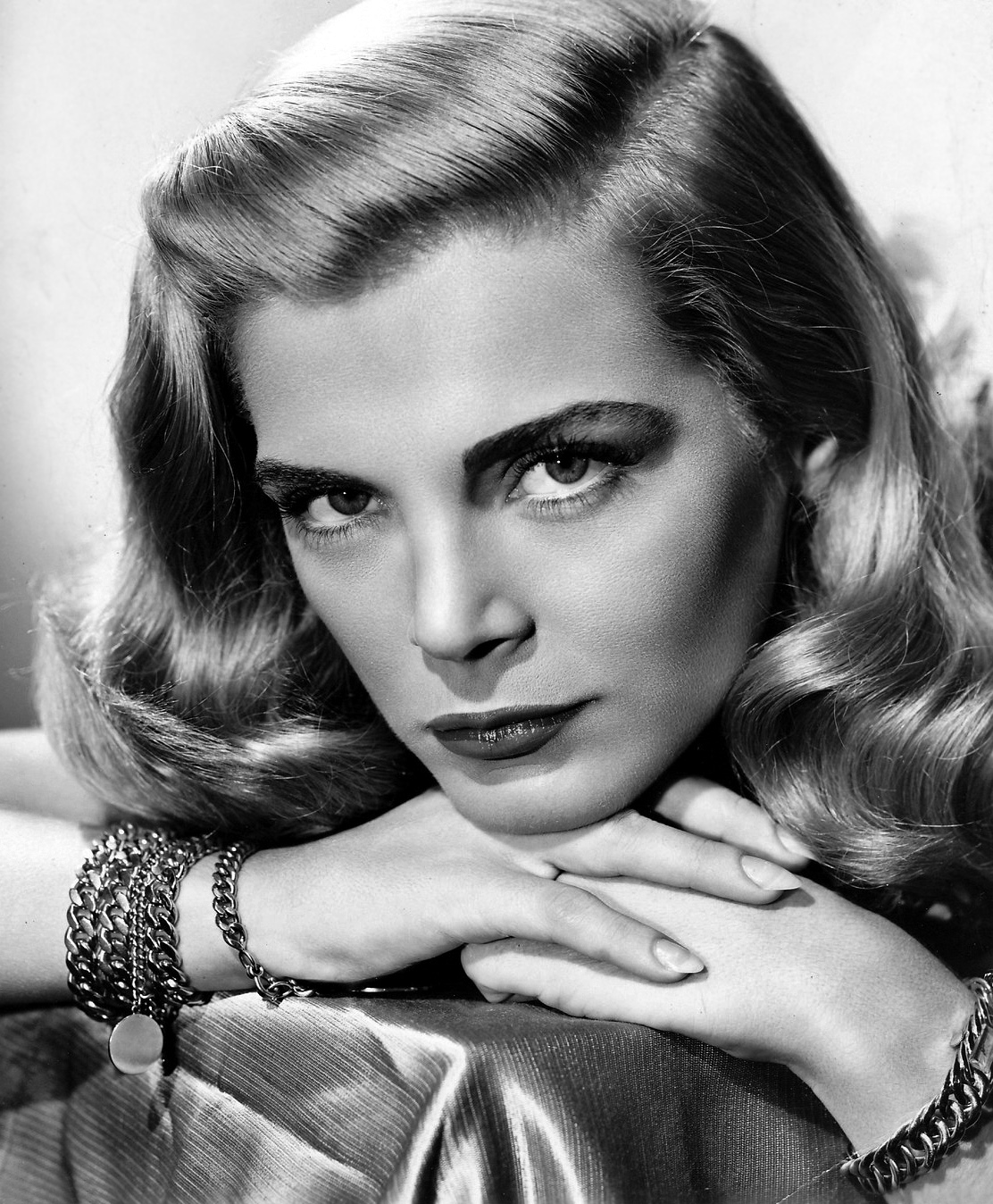
Lizabeth Scott as Liza Wilson

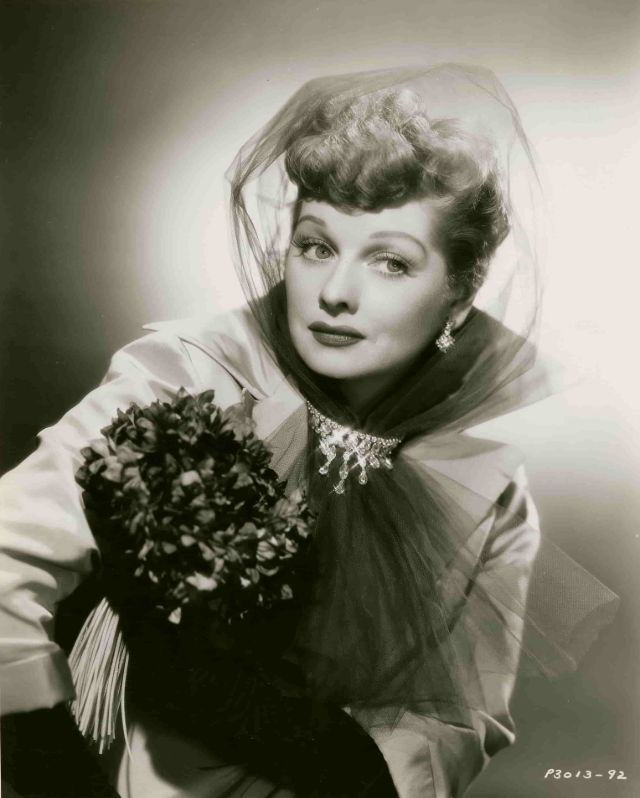
Lucille Ball as Anne

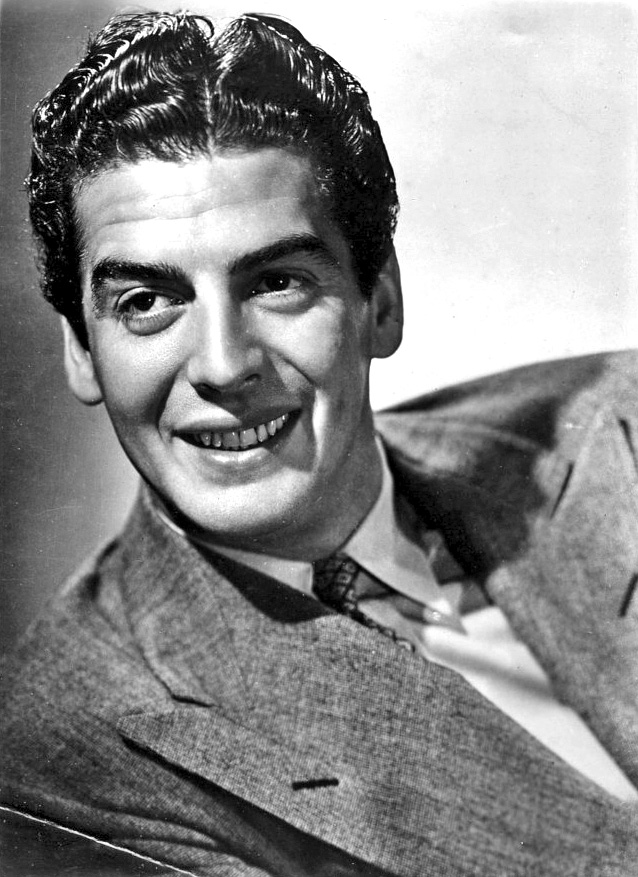
Victor Mature as Pete Wilson

Pete Wilson is the starting quarterback for the New York Chiefs, a professional football team in New York City. He is the top earning player in the league and a big celebrity in the city. The team owner is a man named Lenahan; his secretary is Anne, the widow of his son. She is a good friend and supporter of Pete's. His wife, Liza Wilson, runs her own interior decorating business. Lately, Pete has been suffering from dizziness and fainting during team practices. Pete is hoping to become a college couch, replacing Virgil Ryan, a friend retiring from that position.

Liza's business has been struggling; Pete has poured much of his football earning into it to keep it going. One night, he escorts Liza to a party given by Gilbert Vollmer, a prospective client. During the party, Liza flirts with Gilbert and his father Howard. Pete leaves Liza at the party to attend a retirement party for Virgil. During a private conversation, Virgil tells Pete that the college decided not to hire Pete for the coaching job because they considered Liza to be too ambitious. Instead, the college will hire Tim McCarr, the longtime backup quarterback on the Chiefs, at the end of season, aggravating Pete even more.

The next day, Pete's life insurance company notified him that they are declining a policy for him. This is because a heart condition was diagnosed during his recent physical exam. Pete wants a second opinion from another doctor. Posing as a salesman, he schedules an examination by Dr. Franklin, a cardiologist. Franklin quickly deduces that Pete is an athlete, which Pete finally admits. The cardiologist bluntly tells him that his heart will kill him if he continues to play football. Pete decides to keep playing. He doesn't tell Liza about his heart condition because he is afraid she will reject him. Pete's next game for the Chiefs turns out poorly. Tim then offers him job as his coaching assistant at the college, but Pete is too proud to accept it.

Meanwhile, Liza is still trying to win Howard's business. He frankly tells her that she has no ability in interior decoration. However, he suggest he could recruit some talent for her and become her "silent partner." The clear implication is that Howard wants sexual favors from Liza, but she jumps at the opportunity anyway.

The Chiefs are now traveling by train to their next game in Chicago. Liza declined to go as she wanted to spend time with Howard. While talking with Pete on the train, Anne says that she loves him. A lonely and depressed Pete allows Anne to kiss him. Aware of what just happened, Lenahan gives her a kindly warning about involving herself with Pete.

Lenahan tells Pete that he is not happy about his poor performances lately; he reveals that the other players are calling him "King Cripple." Lehahan decides to replace Pete with Tim for the upcoming game. Winning in Chicago, the team rides the train back to New York. As a cruel joke, someone leaves a pair of crutches in Pete's compartment. Acting out of frustration, Pete slugs Tim.

Back home, Pete tells Liza about the assistant coach offer; she reject it and announces she is leaving him. When a devastated Pete passes out from drinking at a bar, Anne drives there and takes him home. Pete confesses that he has a heart condition to Anne. The following day, Lenahan tells Pete that he is the starting quarterback for the next game because Tim is nursing an injury. Anne is furious that Pete is going to risk his life playing again. Tim, who learns about Pete's condition from Anne, is also upset with him.

Meanwhile, Liza faces reality about Howard. She reads that a woman who had been one of Howard "protegees" had committed suicide. Liza leaves a message for Pete, claiming she still loves him and will attend the next game. The next day, Liza and Pete meet again. She tells him that she would be happy as the wife of an assistant coach. She also insinuates that he might eventually replace Tim. An angry Pete strikes her.

At the end of the film, Pete tells Lenahan and the team about his heart condition and how can never play football again. Lenahan tells him that he is greatest player he has ever known. Going home, Pete finds a weeping Liza. He slaps her again and then passionately kisses her, saying that he will become the assistant head coach and that her interior decoration career was over.

== Cast ==
- Victor Mature as Pete Wilson
- Lucille Ball as Anne, Lenahan's secretary
- Lizabeth Scott as Liza Wilson
- Sonny Tufts as Tim "Pappy" McCarr
- Lloyd Nolan as Lenahan
- Paul Stewart as Dave Argus, a reporter
- Jack Paar as Scoop Spooner
- Jeff Donnell as Penny McCarr
- Art Baker as Howard Vollmer
- Gordon Jones as Bill "Holly" Holloran
- Don Beddoe as Jaeger
- Richard Erdman as Buddy Morgan (as Dick Erdman)
- William "Bill" Phillips as Ozzie, the trainer
- Charles Lang as Whitey
- Kenny Washington as Benny
- Julia Dean as Mrs. Belle Ryan, Virgil's wife
- Everett Glass as Virgil Ryan
- Jim Backus as Dr. Franklin (as James Backus)
- Robert Ellis as Urchin
- Michael St. Angel as Gilbert Vollmer (as Steven Flagg)
- Alex Sharp as Don
- Russell Thorson as Hunk "Eddie" Edwards (as Russ Thorson)
- June Bright as Billy Duane, who commits suicide when Howard Vollmer discards her
- Edward Kotal as Curly
- Audrey Young as Singer

== Production ==
=== Development ===
Easy Living was based on Education of the Heart., a screen story by Irwin Shaw, RKO purchased the story in April 1946. In June 1946, Robert Sparks was assigned to produce the file and Charles Schnee to write the screenplay.In May 1948, the film title was changed to Interference.

=== Cast ===
In May 1948 RKO announced that Jane Greer and Robert Mitchum would play the leads in Easy Living. Neither ended up in the final film. Victor Mature was under contract to 20th Century Fox but had an obligation to make a movie at RKO which dated from before World War II. He was announced for Battleground and Mr Whiskers before eventually being cast in Interference in June 1948. On the same day this was confirmed he was also announced for the lead in Samson and Delilah, which would be filmed after Interference. (He would end up playing Mr Whiskas which became Gambling House.)

In June 1948, Jacques Tourneur was assigned to direct the film. Other key roles went to Sonny Tufts, Lucille Ball and Lizabeth Scott.

=== Shooting ===
There was a great deal of turbulence at RKO at the time due to its purchase by Howard Hughes, prompting the resignation studio and head of production Dore Schary had resigned. Films such as Battleground, Bed of Roses and Setup were cancelled. However Interference went ahead, starting in July 1948.

Tourneur called Easy Living "a hard one" for him because he had no interest in football. He later called it "a very bad film."Easy Living originally ended with Pete leaving LIza for Anne. However, the ending was rewritten during filming to have Pete stay with Liza. The baseball scenes were filmed at Wrigley Field in Chicago.

== Release ==
The film was not released until October 1949, by which time its title had been changed to Easy Living. The delayed release allowed it to benefit from the publicity for Samson and Delilah, which came out in December.

== Reception ==
The New York Times critic gave Easy Living a favorable review, writing that while it,

"...doesn't have the searing candor and impact of some of its predecessors, neither is it a conventional rah-rah cream puff. For Charles Schnee has written a bright, well-knit adaptation of an Irwin Shaw short story, a capable cast has given it the works and the off-screen coaching of the director, Jacques Tourneur, is as crisp and telling as the late Knute Rockne's."

The Los Angeles called Easy Living "moody cinema". It recorded a financial loss of $625,000.

== Lawsuit ==
In November 1949, screenwriters John Stone and Frederick Bond claimed Easy Living was based on their story Never Say Die which they submitted to RKO in 1947. They sued RKO, RKO's story editor and Shaw for $150,000 in damages.

== See also ==
- List of American football films

== Notes ==
- Fujiwara, Chris (2000). Jacques Tourneur. Johns Hopkins University Press. ISBN 978-0-8018-6561-9.
