= Arthur St. Claire =

American screenwriter

- Arthur St. Claire, early 1920s
- Born: Arthur Frederic Evens; 20 July 1899; New York City, New York, U.S.
- Died: 18 October 1950 (aged 51); Los Angeles, California, U.S.
- Occupation: screenwriter
- Spouse(s): Helen Daniels, 1927; Iris Ashton Badger, 1928–

Arthur Frederic St. Claire Evens (20 July 1899 – 18 October 1950) was a screenwriter who wrote the script for the Frank Buck adventure thriller Tiger Fangs.

== Early years ==
Arthur Frederic St. Claire Evens was the only child of Edward and Louise Evens. On the 1920 US census, Edward Evens listed his occupation as investigator for the US Government. Arthur Evens served in the US Army overseas during World War I from January 1918 to March 1919.

== Wife's suicide ==
In June 1927, Evans's wife of 3 months, 22-year-old actress Helen St. Claire, died in her bathroom after a marital spat by swallowing a bottle of antiseptic lotion. Arthur told the police of a lovers' quarrel and declared that their lives had been unhappy due to parental enmity (in particular, on the part of his wife's father, Albert T. Daniels). Helen was buried in New York. In February 1928, Helen's parents supplied new information to police about Helen's death, but in April, a coroner's jury ruled that Helen ended her own life. Arthur thereupon married Iris Ashton Badger, a 29-year-old actress with whom he had been living for months. At the same time, he was convicted of vagrancy and sentenced to 60 days in jail.

== Screenplays ==
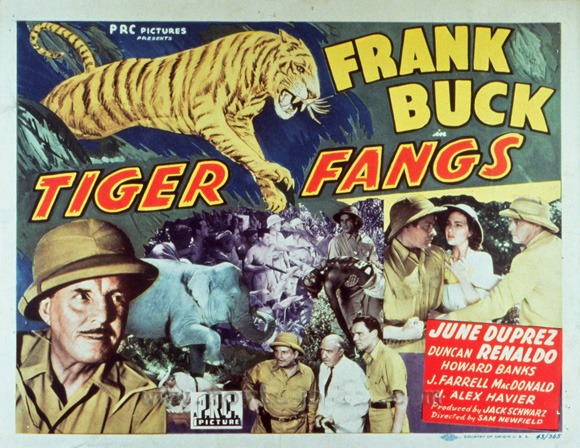
Lobby card for Tiger Fangs

Evens, who used the name Arthur St. Claire, wrote scenarios in Hollywood from the 1920s until the late 1940s. He recycled some of the events of his wife's suicide in fictional form in his screenplay, Delinquent Daughters (1944), a story about a town's shock when a high school girl commits suicide.

Many of St. Claire’s screenplays were B-movies for Producers Releasing Corporation. He is best remembered today for writing Tiger Fangs, a candidate for the national film registry.

== Selected filmography ==
- Secrets of a Model (1940)
- Sweethearts of the U.S.A. (1944)
- Philo Vance's Gamble (1947)
