= Tiger Fangs =

1943 film by Sam Newfield

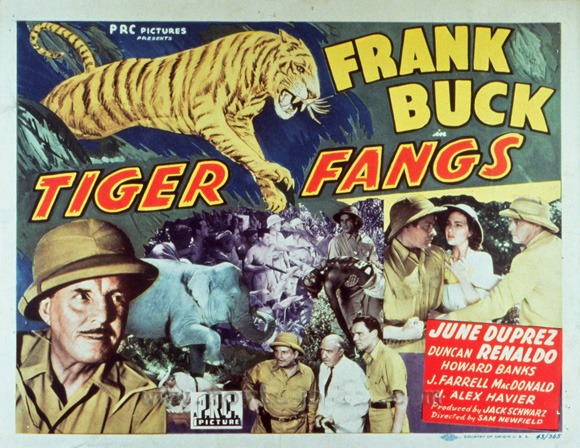
- Theatrical poster
- Directed by: Sam Newfield
- Written by: Arthur St. Claire
- Produced by: Jack Schwarz; Fred McConnell
- Starring: June Duprez; Frank Buck; Duncan Renaldo; Dan Seymour; Arno Frey; J. Farrell MacDonald; Pedro Regas
- Cinematography: Ira H. Morgan
- Edited by: George M. Merrick
- Music by: Lee Zahler
- Distributed by: Producers Releasing Corporation
- Release date: September 10, 1943
- Running time: 58 minutes
- Country: United States
- Language: English

Tiger Fangs is a 1943 American adventure/thriller film directed by Sam Newfield and starring Frank Buck and June Duprez. It was distributed Producers Releasing Corporation. The film's sets were designed by the art director Paul Palmentola.

== Plot ==
Frank Buck tangles with Nazis who have been doping tigers in Malaya, thereby making man-eaters of them. With the cats on a rampage, rubber production is seriously curtailed and the Allied war effort jeopardized. Buck and his associates, Peter Jeremy, Geoffrey MacCardle and Linda McCardle, thwart the Teutonic malefactors: the villainous Nazi Dr. Lang (Arno Frey) and his portly accomplice Henry Gratz. Thereafter, life is safe once again in the jungle.

== Cast ==
- Frank Buck as Frank Buck
- June Duprez as Linda McCardle
- Duncan Renaldo as Peter Jeremy
- Howard Banks as Tom Clayton
- J. Farrell MacDonald as Geoffrey MacCardle
- Alex Havier as Ali (credited as J. Alex Havier)
- Arno Frey as Dr. Lang
- Dan Seymour as Henry Gratz
- Pedro Regas as Takko

== Reception ==
“Juves should find this Frank Buck actioner exciting. It's a fiction piece, and not the usual jungle travelogue…June Duprez is as attractive a biologist as one could hope to meet up with in the middle of the jungle.”

“The animal shots are eye-filling, as usual, and especially well photographed…They're convincing enough…to keep the younger generation glued to movie house seats. Sam Newfield directed with a good sense of melodramatic action, and it is Mr. Buck himself who gives the stand-out performance. The jungle fellow is a right natural actor.”

== Gallery ==
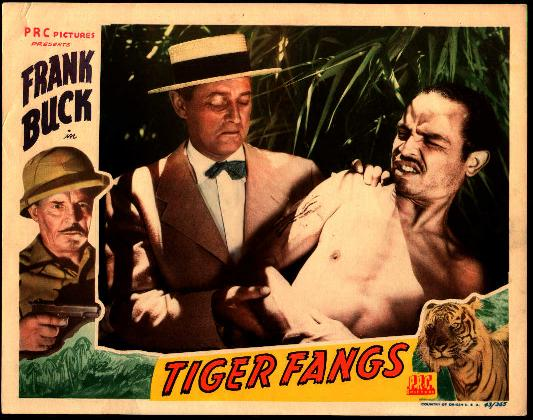
Promotional photo for Tiger Fangs, showing Arno Frey (left) and Pedro Regas (right)

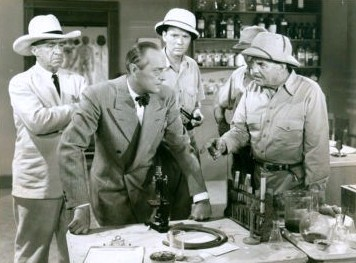
Left to right: MacDonald, Frey, Banks, and Buck in the film

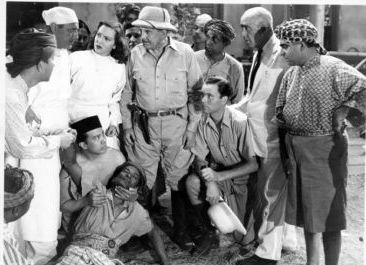
Still from Tiger Fangs, with Buck and Duprez at center

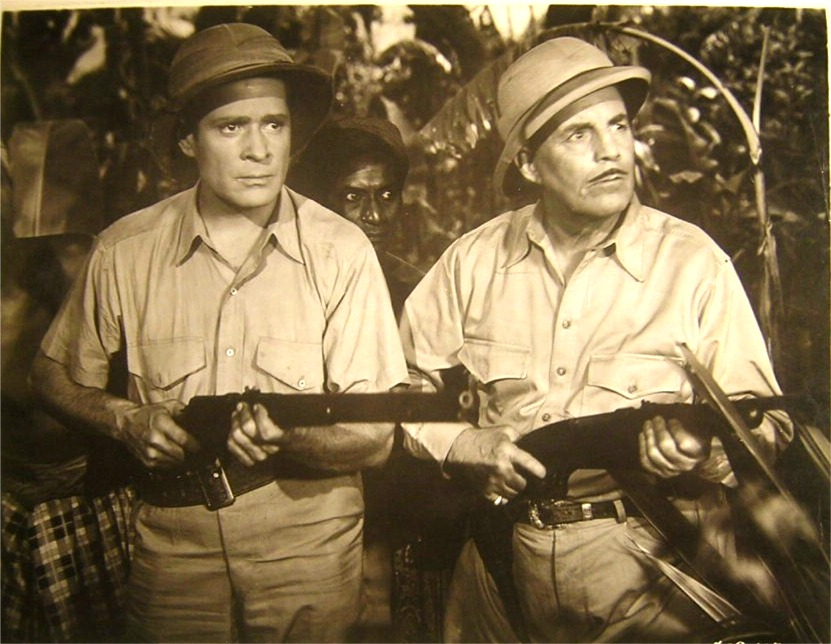
Renaldo (left) and Buck in the film

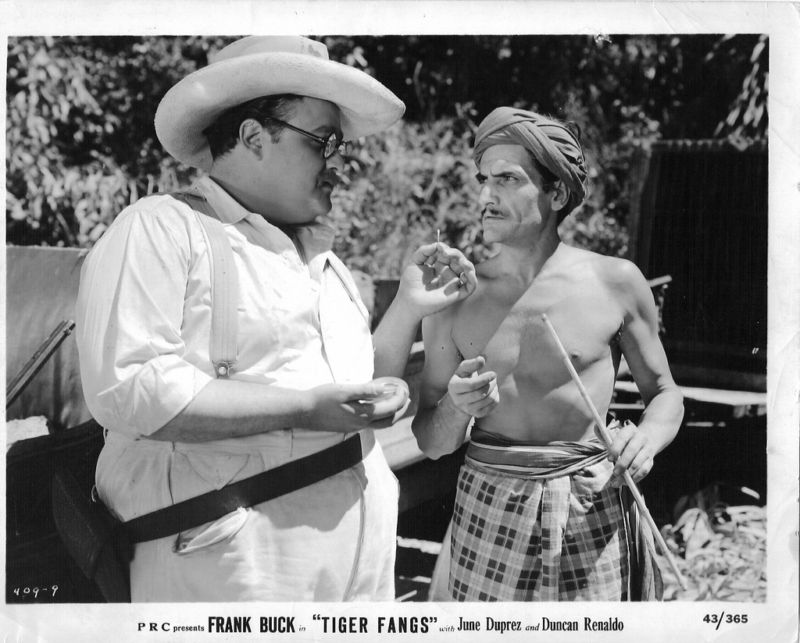
Promotional photo featuring Dan Seymour (left) and Pedro Regas

== Bibliography ==
- Lehrer, Steven (2006). Bring 'Em Back Alive: The Best of Frank Buck. Texas Tech University press. p. 248. ISBN 0-89672-582-0.
