= Fred McConnell =

American film producer

Fred J. McConnell
- Born: September 29, 1883; Waseca, Minnesota
- Died: November 21, 1962, age 79; Los Angeles
- Occupations: motion picture producer, writer
- Known for: work with Frank Buck
- Spouse: Jennie M McConnell

Fred Jarvis McConnell (September 29, 1883 in Waseca, Minnesota – November 21, 1962, in Los Angeles) was an associate producer of Frank Buck's movie Tiger Fangs.

== Early career ==
McConnell studied at the University of Wisconsin, and worked for the Chicago American and the Cleveland News. He worked in advertising with Kaufman & Handy and other Chicago agencies, and entered films in 1923 as manager of serial production at Universal Pictures. In 1926 he was an independent producer of Western and dog features for Pathé. He was the eastern sales manager for The March of Time and joined the Columbia Pictures short subject sales department in 1936. Among the films he worked on: The Fighting Ranger, The Last Frontier, and The Return of the Riddle Rider.

== Work with Frank Buck ==
In 1944, McConnell was associate producer of the Frank Buck film Tiger Fangs.
