= Million Dollar Pursuit =

- Directed by: R. G. Springsteen
- Written by: Albert DeMond; Bradbury Foote
- Produced by: Stephen Auer
- Starring: Penny Edwards; Grant Withers; Norman Budd
- Cinematography: Walter Strenge
- Edited by: Robert M. Leeds
- Music by: Stanley Wilson
- Production company: Republic Pictures
- Distributed by: Republic Pictures
- Release date: May 18, 1951 (Los Angeles)
- Running time: 60 minutes
- Country: United States
- Language: English

Million Dollar Pursuit is a 1951 Republic Pictures crime film noir directed by R. G. Springsteen and starring Penny Edwards, Grant Withers and Norman Budd. The film's art director was Frank Hotaling.

== Cast ==
- Penny Edwards as Ronnie LaVerne
- Grant Withers as Carlo Petrov
- Norman Budd as Monte Norris
- Michael St. Angel as Police Lieut. Matt Whitcomb
- Rhys Williams as Waxman "Waxey" Wilk
- Mikel Conrad as Louie Palino
- Paul Hurst as Ray Harvey
- Denver Pyle as Nick Algren
- Ted Pavelec as Muller
- John De Simone as Speed Nelson
- Don Beddoe as Bowen
- Ed Cassidy as Deputy Sheriff
- Edward Clark as Holcomb
- John Hamilton as Police Inspector Morgan
- George Brand as Parker
- Jack Shea as Police Lieut. Spears
- Bill Baldwin as Radio Announcer
- Noel Reyburn as Henley
- Sam Sebby as Driver

== Release ==
The film opened at Grauman's Chinese Theatre in Hollywood and other Los Angeles-area theaters on May 18, 1951 as the second feature to Fighting Coast Guard.

== Bibliography ==
- Len D. Martin. The Republic Pictures Checklist: Features, Serials, Cartoons, Short Subjects and Training Films of Republic Pictures Corporation, 1935-1959. McFarland, 1998.
