= They Raid by Night =

1942 film by Spencer Gordon Bennet

- Original theatrical poster
- Directed by: Spencer Gordon Bennet
- Screenplay by: Jack Natteford
- Produced by: Dixon R. Harwin
- Starring: Lyle Talbot; June Duprez
- Cinematography: Gilbert Warrenton
- Edited by: Charles Henkel Jr.
- Music by: David Chudnow
- Production company: PRC
- Distributed by: PRC (US)
- Release date: June 19, 1942 (US)
- Running time: 73 minutes
- Country: United States
- Language: English

They Raid by Night is a 1942 American low-budget World War II film directed by Spencer Gordon Bennet and starring Lyle Talbot and June Duprez. It was from Producers Releasing Corporation.

== Plot ==
The story follows the insertion of British Commandos into Norway to rescue Norwegian Gen. Heden from captivity and take him to the United Kingdom to lead the Free Norwegian Forces.

The film opens with the execution of a British spy who was sent to support partisan activities. A small team is assembled which consists of Canadian Capt. Robert Owen, British Sgt. Harry Hall and Norwegian Lt. Erik Falken. The team parachutes in, but Falken is recognised by a local woman who reports them to her German lover and Dalberg, a Quisling. A team is sent to capture them but after they overpower their captors and free the general from the prison camp. They are soon pursued by the German authorities.

On the road in a captured German car, they are attacked and forced to take shelter after Heden is hurt. They send Falken to get assistance from a doctor but he is betrayed once again by the same woman whom he had known when growing up in his hometown. The Germans take Falken alive and, pretending to be the doctor they requested, capture Owen near the house they are hiding in. Hall manages to keep Heden in safety in the house.

Owen misleads the Germans about their escape plans and after the Germans realise their mistake, they are surprised to find that the two prisoners have been freed by Dalberg. Owen and Falken manage to return to Hall and Heden, and the party moves off to rendezvous with the incoming Commandos and Royal Navy boats.

The film includes real footage from British Commando raids on German occupying forces in Norway in March and December of 1941.

== Main cast ==
- Lyle Talbot as Capt. Robert Owen
- June Duprez as Inga Beckering
- Victor Varconi as Col. Otto von Ritter
- George N. Neise as Lt. Erik Falken
- Charley Rogers as Sgt. Harry Hall
- Paul Baratoff as Maj. Gen. Heden
- Leslie Denison as Capt. Ralph Deane
- Crane Whitley as Doctor
- Sven Hugo Borg as Dalberg
- Eric Wilton as Maj. Gen. Lloyd
- Pierce Lyden as Braun, Ritter's Aide
- John Beck as Mr. Sandling, Beggar
- Robert Fischer as Major Von Memel
- Sigfrid Tor as German Lieutenant
- Brian O'Hara as Lammet, Radio Broadcaster
- 'Snub' Pollard as Bertie, Messenger / Orderly
- Bruce Kellogg as Sentry
