= Perilous Holiday =

1946 film by Edward H. Griffith

- Directed by: Edward H. Griffith
- Screenplay by: Roy Chanslor
- Based on: Colliers Magazine serial by Robert Carson
- Produced by: Phil L. Ryan
- Starring: Pat O'Brien; Ruth Warrick; Alan Hale
- Cinematography: Charles Lawton Jr.
- Edited by: Viola Lawrence
- Music by: Paul Sawtell
- Production company: Phil L. Ryan Productions
- Distributed by: Columbia Pictures
- Release date: March 21, 1946
- Running time: 90 minutes
- Country: United States
- Language: English

Perilous Holiday is a 1946 American film noir crime film directed by Edward H. Griffith and starring Pat O'Brien, Ruth Warrick and Alan Hale. It was distributed by Columbia Pictures. The screenplay concerns a woman newspaper reporter who is on the trail of a smuggling ring operating out of Mexico.

== Plot ==
Patrick Nevil makes the casual acquaintance of fellow American Agnes Stuart while on vacation in Mexico City. What Stuart doesn't know is that Nevil is a treasury agent, out to get expatriate counterfeiters Dr. Lilley and George Richards. What Nevil doesn't know is that Stuart is also out to get Lilley, whom she holds responsible for her father's death.

== Cast ==
- Pat O'Brien as Patrick Nevil
- Ruth Warrick as Agnes Stuart
- Alan Hale as Dr. Lilley
- Edgar Buchanan as George Richards
- Audrey Long as Audrey Latham
- Willard Robertson as Graeme
- Eduardo Ciannelli as Señor Aguirre
- Minna Gombell as Mrs. Latham
- Martin Garralaga as Manuel Perez
- Al Hill as Benny Lockner
- Jay Novello as Luigi
- Pedro Regas as Pedro
- Amelia Vargas as Dancer
- Eddie Le Baron as himself - Continental Orchestra Leader

== Production ==
Perilous Holiday is Griffith's final film.

== Bibliography ==
- Stephens, Michael L. Art Directors in Cinema: A Worldwide Biographical Dictionary. McFarland, 1998.
