= 13 Rue Madeleine =

1947 film by Henry Hathaway

- Film poster
- Directed by: Henry Hathaway
- Written by: John Monks, Jr. Sy Bartlett
- Produced by: Louis De Rochemont
- Starring: James Cagney; Annabella; Richard Conte; Frank Latimore
- Narrated by: Reed Hadley
- Cinematography: Norbert Brodine
- Edited by: Harmon Jones
- Music by: David Buttolph
- Production company: Twentieth Century Fox
- Distributed by: Twentieth Century Fox
- Release date: January 15, 1947
- Running time: 95 minutes
- Country: United States
- Language: English
- Box office: $2,750,000 (US rentals)

13 Rue Madeleine is a 1947 American World War II spy film directed by Henry Hathaway and starring James Cagney, Annabella, Richard Conte and Frank Latimore. Allied volunteers are trained as spies in the leadup to the invasion of Europe, but one of them is a German double agent.

== Plot ==
Bob Sharkey is given charge of a group of American espionage candidates. However, he is informed by his boss Charles Gibson that one of his students is a German Abwehr agent. He accepts the challenge of identifying him. He correctly chooses the student, who is using the alias of Bill O'Connell. Gibson reveals that O'Connell is actually Wilhelm Kuncel, one of Germany's top spies. His mission is to determine the date and location of the Allied invasion of Europe. They assign O'Connell a job in London that gives him full access to false information about "Plan B", the invasion of Germany through the lowlands, hoping that he will pass on the misleading information to his superiors.

At the end of their training, three of the new agents—Frenchwoman Suzanne de Beaumont, American Jeff Lassiter and Kuncel—are sent to Britain, where they prepare to fly into German-occupied territory. O'Connell / Kuncel is given a mission in Holland, supposedly because of his familiarity with the region. Lassiter is assigned to kidnap the French collaborator Duclois and bring him to England; Duclois designed and built the main assembly and supply depot for V-2 rockets that will be used against the key Allied invasion port of Southampton, and what he knows would be vital for achieving its destruction. De Beaumont goes along as Lassiter's radio operator. Sharkey tells Lassiter about O'Connell / Kuncel and orders him to kill Kuncel if he suspects that Kuncel has not been deceived. However, on the airplane, Lassiter cannot conceal his uneasiness from Kuncel, who realizes Lassiter suspects him and sabotages Lassiter's parachute, causing him to fall to his death. Gibson and Sharkey conclude that Kuncel now knows that the information that he was given is false.

With no time to brief another agent, Sharkey volunteers to take Lassiter's place. Gibson is reluctant to do so, as Sharkey knows the true date and location of the invasion, but finally agrees. With the help of the local French resistance led by the town's mayor, Sharkey takes Duclois prisoner. However, in stopping Kuncel from interfering with the airplane departing with Duclois, Sharkey is captured. De Beaumont is killed while transmitting the news to England. Kuncel takes Sharkey to Gestapo headquarters at 13 Rue Madeleine in Le Havre and supervises his torture when Sharkey refuses to talk. Back in Britain, Gibson has no choice but to order a bombing raid to destroy the building before Sharkey cracks. When the bombing starts, Sharkey laughs in triumph in Kuncel's face.

== Cast ==
- James Cagney as Robert Emmett 'Bob' Sharkey
- Annabella as Suzanne de Beaumont
- Richard Conte as Wilhelm Kuncel / William H. 'Bill' O'Connell
- Frank Latimore as Jeff Lassiter
- Walter Abel as Charles Gibson
- Melville Cooper as Pappy Simpson
- Sam Jaffe as Mayor Galimard
- Trevor Bardette as Resistance fighter (uncredited)
- Red Buttons as Second Jump Master (uncredited)
- Arno Frey as German Officer (uncredited)
- Karl Malden as B-24 Jumpmaster (uncredited)
- E. G. Marshall as Galimard's driver Emile (uncredited)
- Donald Randolph as La Roche (uncredited)
- Roland Winters as Van Duyval (uncredited)
- Blanche Yurka as Madame Thillot (uncredited)

== Production ==
Prohibited from mentioning the OSS in films during the war, several Hollywood studios produced films about the agency after the war, such as O.S.S. (Paramount), Cloak and Dagger (Warner Bros./United States Pictures) and Notorious (RKO), directed by Alfred Hitchcock. Although 13 Rue Madeleine was originally written to showcase the O.S.S., with Cagney playing a character based on William Donovan and featuring Peter Ortiz as a technical advisor, Donovan raised major objections to the film, including the idea that his agency had been infiltrated by an enemy agent. The spy group was renamed "O77" and Cagney's character had no similarities to Donovan.

The film followed Fox's The House on 92nd Street, a true story of FBI counterespionage, which shared the same director, producer and one of the writers.

Later parts of the filming took place in Quebec City, Quebec, Canada while the earlier parts were filmed at Boston College, USA.

The Breen Office objected to the Americans bombing a building solely to kill Sharkey. However, Sy Bartlett, one of the film's scriptwriters, had served in the Army Air Corps during World War II and claimed that such an incident did indeed take place, although in a different context. According to director Henry Hathaway, that incident was the basis for the film's final scene.

== Reception ==
In a scathingly negative contemporary review for The New York Times, critic Bosley Crowther wrote:

The highly incredible notion that a known Nazi agent would be assigned to parachute into Holland is startlingly introduced. This is followed by an equally implausible manipulation of the plot whereby the boss of the unit is plummeted into France to correct the consequent fault. And the final device, in which our bombers are dispatched to destroy the house in which this agent, captured, is being tortured, is sheer, undisguised "Hollywood." This drift into full-blown melodrama after a neat "documentary" approach is not the only disconcertion in the picture. The plotting is vague and confused after the boss spy—the hero—gets going in a peculiarly Anglicized France. (Everyone—even the Germans—speak English. Fancy that!) And the acting, while smoothly modulated in the first phase, goes berserk later on. Mr. Cagney is earliest and convincing as the boss spy until he lands in France; then his pose as a Vichy Frenchman is utterly fatuous. It's as plain as his silly little felt hat that he's just a tough guy from Hollywood.

Crowther wrote more about the film several days after his initial review:

The whole show, despite some vivid action, evolves as a straight adventure splash. Apparently this was inevitable, in view of the obvious delight which Hollywood takes in advancing its fictional stereotypes. And we'll further agree that the consequence ... makes a fast and muscular show, once it has recklessly departed with its initial objective style. But we have to observe that the technique known as "semi-documentary" has been botched and that the opening feint at giving us a true look at the OSS is a bluff. This is peculiarly distressing, in the first place, because this film was made for Twentieth Century-Fox by Louis de Rochemont, who has a fine reputation for "factual" films. ... We are sure that a more impressive picture could have been made, if the calculated style, so well displayed in the beginning, had been maintained throughout. But then that might have punctured all the lurid notions of the OSS and the fictitious boys in the studio would have to build them up all over again.
