= Arizona Gang Busters =

1940 film directed by Sam Newfield

- Theatrical release poster
- Directed by: Sam Newfield
- Screenplay by: William Lively
- Produced by: Sigmund Neufeld
- Starring: Tim McCoy; Pauline Haddon; Lou Fulton; Forrest Taylor; Julian Rivero; Arno Frey
- Cinematography: Jack Greenhalgh
- Edited by: Holbrook N. Todd
- Production companies: Sigmund Neufeld Productions; Producers Releasing Corporation
- Distributed by: Producers Releasing Corporation
- Release date: September 16, 1940
- Running time: 60 minutes
- Country: United States
- Language: English

Arizona Gang Busters is a 1940 American Western film directed by Sam Newfield and written by William Lively. The film stars Tim McCoy, Pauline Haddon, Lou Fulton, Forrest Taylor, Julian Rivero and Arno Frey. The film was released on September 16, 1940, by Producers Releasing Corporation.

== Plot ==
A ring of saboteurs headed by Carl Schmidt is building an arsenal along the US-Mexican border. The US and Mexico send a team of agents to investigate, but when they arrive at the site of an arranged meeting, they discover the men they were to meet have been murdered—and they are arrested for the killings.

== Cast ==
- Tim McCoy as Trigger Tim Rand
- Pauline Haddon as Sue Lambert
- Lou Fulton as Sidekick Lanky
- Forrest Taylor as Ed Lambert
- Julian Rivero as Captain Rodriguez
- Arno Frey as Carl Schmidt
- Paul Ellis as Henchman Mario
- Kenne Duncan as Sheriff Dan Kirk
- Jack Rutherford as Thorpe
- Elizabeth LaMal as Mrs. Kirk
- Otto Reichow as Henry Hess
- Lita Cortez as Lola
