= The Brighton Strangler =

1945 film by Max Nosseck

- Directed by: Max Nosseck
- Written by: Hugh Gray; Arnold Lippschitz; Max Nosseck
- Produced by: Sid Rogell; Herman Schlom
- Starring: John Loder; June Duprez; Michael St. Angel
- Cinematography: J. Roy Hunt
- Edited by: Les Millbrook
- Music by: Leigh Harline
- Production company: RKO Pictures
- Distributed by: RKO Pictures
- Release date: May 10, 1945
- Running time: 67 minutes
- Country: United States
- Language: English

The Brighton Strangler is a 1945 American crime film directed by Max Nosseck and starring John Loder, June Duprez and Michael St. Angel.

== Plot ==
During The Blitz in wartime London, an actor suffers a concussion and believes himself to be the character he has most recently been playing - a vicious strangler with a hit list of potential victims.

== Cast ==
- John Loder as Reginald Parker / Edward Grey
- June Duprez as April Manby Carson
- Michael St. Angel as Lieutenant Bob Carson
- Miles Mander as Chief Inspector W.R. Allison
- Rose Hobart as Dorothy Kent
- Gilbert Emery as Doctor Manby (final film)
- Rex Evans as Leslie Shelton
- Matthew Boulton as Inspector Graham
- Olaf Hytten as Banks, the valet
- Lydia Bilbrook as Mrs Manby
- Ian Wolfe as Lord Mayor
- Frank Mayo as Policeman (uncredited)

== Legacy ==
This film has been championed since 2013 by the British movie podcast "Attaboy Clarence", (named after the final line in It's A Wonderful Life) in which the Strangler's reading of the word "Canterbury..." has become the podcast's catchphrase.
