= Bradbury Foote =

American screenwriter

- Born: April 5, 1894; Fairfield, Iowa, United States
- Died: December 14, 1995 (aged 101); Los Angeles, California; United States
- Other name: Charles F. Foote
- Occupation: Screenwriter
- Years active: 1937–1951

Bradbury Foote (April 5, 1894 – December 14, 1995) was an American screenwriter.

== Selected filmography ==
- The Bride Wore Red (1937)
- Of Human Hearts (1938)
- Edison, the Man (1940)
- Billy the Kid (1941)
- Million Dollar Pursuit (1951)

== Bibliography ==
- Len D. Martin. The Republic Pictures Checklist: Features, Serials, Cartoons, Short Subjects and Training Films of Republic Pictures Corporation, 1935-1959. McFarland, 1998.
