= 3D film =

Film that has the appearance of three-dimensional depth

A three-dimensional film (3D film), also known as a 3D movie, is a motion picture made to give the impression of stereopsis, often by employing special glasses worn by viewers. 3D films were prominently featured in the 1950s in American cinema and later experienced a worldwide resurgence in the 1980s and 1990s driven by IMAX high-end theaters and Disney-themed venues. 3D films became increasingly successful throughout the 2000s, peaking with the success of 3D presentations of Avatar in December 2009, after which 3D films again decreased in popularity. Certain directors have also taken more experimental approaches to 3D filmmaking, most notably Jean-Luc Godard in his film Goodbye to Language.

== History ==
=== Before film ===
The basic components of two-view stereoscopic 3D film were introduced separately between 1833 and 1839. Stroboscopic animation was developed by Joseph Plateau in 1832 and published in 1833 in the form of a stroboscopic disc, which he later called the fantascope and became better known as the phénakisticope. Around the very same time (1832/1833), Charles Wheatstone developed the stereoscope, but he did not really make it public before June 1838. The first practical forms of photography were introduced in January 1839 by Louis Daguerre and Henry Fox Talbot. A combination of these elements into animated stereoscopic photography may have been conceived early on, but for decades it did not become possible to capture motion in real-time photographic recordings due to the long exposure times necessary for the light-sensitive emulsions that were used.

Charles Wheatstone got inventor Henry Fox Talbot to produce some calotype pairs for the stereoscope and received the first results in October 1840. Only a few more experimental stereoscopic photographs were made before David Brewster introduced his stereoscope with lenses in 1849. Wheatstone also approached Joseph Plateau with the suggestion to combine the stereoscope with the fantascope. In 1849, Plateau published about this concept in an article about several improvements made to his fantascope and suggested a stop-motion technique that would involve a series of photographs of purpose-made plaster statuettes in different poses. The idea reached Jules Duboscq, an instrument maker who already marketed Plateau's Fantascope as well as the stereoscopes of Wheatstone and Brewster. In November 1852, Duboscq added the concept of his "Stéréoscope-fantascope, ou Bïoscope" to his stereoscope patent. Production of images proved very difficult, since the photographic sequence had to be carefully constructed from separate still images. The bioscope was no success, and the only extant disc, without apparatus, is found in the Joseph Plateau collection of the University of Ghent. The disc contains 12 albumen image pairs of a machine in motion.

Most other early attempts to create motion pictures also aimed to include stereoscopic effects.

In November 1851, Antoine Claudet claimed to have created a stereoscope that showed people in motion. The device initially only showed two phases, but during the next two years, Claudet worked on a camera that would record stereoscopic pairs for four different poses (patented in 1853). Claudet found that the stereoscopic effect did not work properly in this device, but believed the illusion of motion was successful.

In 1855, Johann Nepomuk Czermak published an article about his Stereophoroskop. His first idea to create 3D animation involved sticking pins in a stroboscopic disc to create a sequence that would show one pin moving further into the cardboard and back. He also designed a device that would feed the image pairs from two stroboscopic discs into one lenticular stereoscope and a vertical predecessor of the zoetrope.

On February 27, 1860, Peter Hubert Desvignes received British patent no. 537 for 28 monocular and stereoscopic variations of cylindrical stroboscopic devices. This included a version that used an endless band of pictures running between two spools that was intermittently lit by an electric spark. Desvignes' Mimoscope, received an Honourable Mention "for ingenuity of construction" at the 1862 International Exhibition in London. It could "exhibit drawings, models, single or stereoscopic photographs, so as to animate animal movements, or that of machinery, showing various other illusions." Desvignes "employed models, insects and other objects, instead of pictures, with perfect success." The horizontal slits (like in Czermak's Stereophoroskop) allowed a much improved view, with both eyes, of the opposite pictures.

In 1861, American engineer Coleman Sellers II received US patent No. 35,317 for the kinematoscope, a device that exhibited "stereoscopic pictures as to make them represent objects in motion". In his application he stated: "This has frequently been done with plane pictures but has never been, with stereoscopic pictures". He used three sets of stereoscopic photographs in a sequence with some duplicates to regulate the flow of a simple repetitive motion, but also described a system for very large series of pictures of complicated motion.

On August 11, 1877, the Daily Alta newspaper announced a project by Eadward Muybridge and Leland Stanford to produce sequences of photographs of a running horse with 12 stereoscopic cameras. Muybridge had much experience with stereo photography and had already made instantaneous pictures of Stanford's horse Occident running at full speed. He eventually managed to shoot the proposed sequences of running horses in June 1878 with stereoscopic cameras. The published result and animated versions for his zoopraxiscope were not stereoscopic, but in 1898 Muybridge claimed that he had (privately) viewed the pictures in two synchronized zoetropes with Wheatstone's reflecting stereoscope as a "very satisfactory reproduction of an apparently solid miniature horse trotting and of another galloping".

Thomas Edison demonstrated his phonograph on November 29, 1877, after previous announcements of the device for recording and replaying sound had been published earlier in the year. An article in Scientific American concluded, "It is already possible, by ingenious optical contrivances, to throw stereoscopic photographs of people on screens in full view of an audience. Add the talking phonograph to counterfeit their voices, and it would be difficult to carry the illusion of real presence much further". Wordsworth Donisthorpe announced in the January 24, 1878, edition of Nature that he would advance that conception: "By combining the phonograph with the kinesigraph, I will undertake not only to produce a talking picture of Mr. Gladstone, which, with motionless lips and unchanged expression, shall positively recite his latest anti-Turkish speech in his own voice and tone. Not only this, but the life size photograph itself shall move and gesticulate precisely as he did when making the speech, the words and gestures corresponding as in real life." Dr. Phipson, a correspondent for British news in a French photography magazine, relayed the concept but renamed the device "Kinétiscope" to reflect the viewing purpose rather than the recording option. This was picked up in the United States and discussed in an interview with Edison later in the year. Neither Donisthorpe's nor Edison's later moving picture results were stereoscopic.

=== Early patents and tests ===
In the late 1890s, British film pioneer William Friese-Greene filed a patent for a 3D film process. In his patent, two films were projected side by side on screen. The viewer looked through a stereoscope to converge the two images. Because of the obtrusive mechanics behind this method, theatrical use was not practical.

Frederic Eugene Ives patented his stereo camera rig in 1900. The camera had two lenses positioned 1 3/4 inches (4.45 centimeters) apart.

On June 10, 1915, Edwin S. Porter and William E. Waddell presented tests to an audience at the Astor Theater in New York City. In red-green anaglyph, the audience was presented three reels of tests, which included rural scenes, test shots of Marie Doro, a segment of John Mason playing a number of passages from Jim the Penman (a film released by Famous Players–Lasky that year, but not in 3D), Oriental dancers, and a reel of footage of Niagara Falls. However, according to Adolph Zukor in his 1953 autobiography The Public Is Never Wrong: My 50 Years in the Motion Picture Industry, nothing was produced in this process after these tests.

=== 1909–1915: Alabastra and Kinoplastikon ===
By 1909, the German film market suffered much from overproduction and too much competition. German film tycoon Oskar Messter had initially gained much financial success with the Tonbild synchronized sound films of his Biophon system since 1903, but the films were losing money by the end of the decade, and Messter would stop Tonbild production in 1913. Producers and exhibitors were looking into new film attractions and invested for instance in colorful imagery. The development of stereoscopic cinema seemed a logical step to lure visitors back into the movie theaters.

In 1909, German civil engineer August Engelsmann patented a process that projected filmed performances within a physical decor on an actual stage. Soon after, Messter obtained patents for a very similar process, probably by agreement with Engelsmann, and started marketing it as "Alabastra". Performers were brightly dressed and brightly lit while filmed against a black background, mostly miming their singing or musical skills or dancing to the circa four-minute pre-recorded phonographs. The film recordings would be projected from below, to appear as circa 30 inch figures on a glass pane in front of a small stage, in a setup very similar to the Pepper's ghost illusion that offered a popular stage trick technique since the 1860s. The glass pane was not visible to the audience and the projected figures seemed able to move around freely across the stage in their virtual tangible and lifelike appearance. The brightness of the figures was necessary to avoid see-through spots and made them resemble alabaster sculptures. To adapt to this appearance, several films featured Pierrot or other white clowns, while some films were probably hand-coloured. Although Alabastra was well received by the press, Messter produced few titles, hardly promoted them and abandoned it altogether a few years later. He believed the system to be uneconomical due to its need for special theatres instead of the widely available movie screens, and he did not like that it seemed only suitable for stage productions and not for "natural" films. Nonetheless, there were numerous imitators in Germany and Messter and Engelsmann still teamed with American businessman Frank Joseph Godsol (Goldsoll) set up a short-lived variant named "Fantomo" in 1914.

Rather in agreement with Messter or not, Karl Juhasz and Franz Haushofer opened a Kinoplastikon theatre in Vienna in 1911. Their patented system was very similar to Alabaster, but projected life-size figures from the wings of the stage. With much higher ticket prices than standard cinema, it was targeted at middle-class audiences to fill the gap between low-brow films and high-class theatre. Audiences reacted enthusiastically and by 1913 there reportedly were 250 theatres outside Austria, in France, Italy, United Kingdom, Russia and North America. However, the first Kinoplastikon in Paris started in January 1914 and the premiere in New York took place in the Hippodrome in March 1915. In 1913, Walter R. Booth directed 10 films for the U.K. Kinoplastikon, presumably in collaboration with Cecil Hepworth. Theodore Brown, the licensee in the U.K. also patented a variant with front and back projection and reflected decor, and Goldsoll applied for a very similar patent only 10 days later. Further development and exploitation was probably halted by World War I.

Alabastra and Kinoplastikon were often advertised as stereoscopic and screenless. Although in reality the effect was heavily dependent on glass screen projection and the films were not stereoscopic, the shows seemed truly three-dimensional as the figures were clearly separate from the background and virtually appeared inside the real, three-dimensional stage area without any visible screen.

Eventually, longer (multi-reel) films with story arcs proved to be the way out of the crisis in the movie market and supplanted the previously popular short films that mostly aimed to amuse people with tricks, gags or other brief variety and novelty attractions. Sound film, stereoscopic film and other novel techniques were relatively cumbersome to combine with multiple reels and were abandoned for a while.

=== Early systems of stereoscopic filmmaking (pre-1952) ===
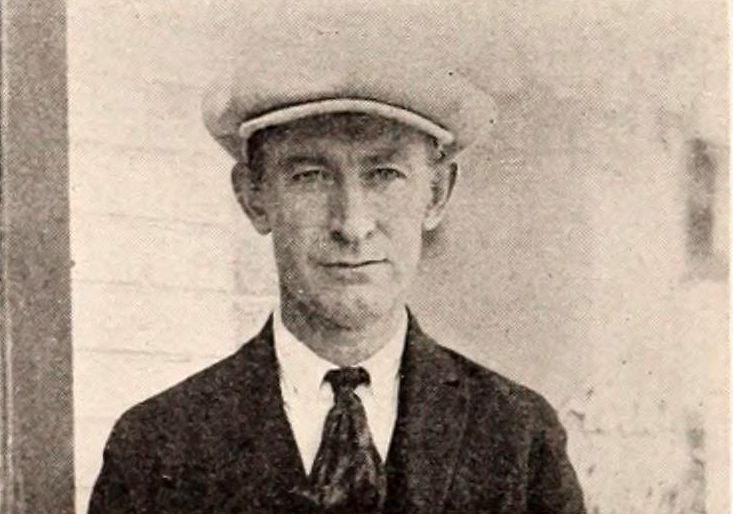
Fairall in 1922

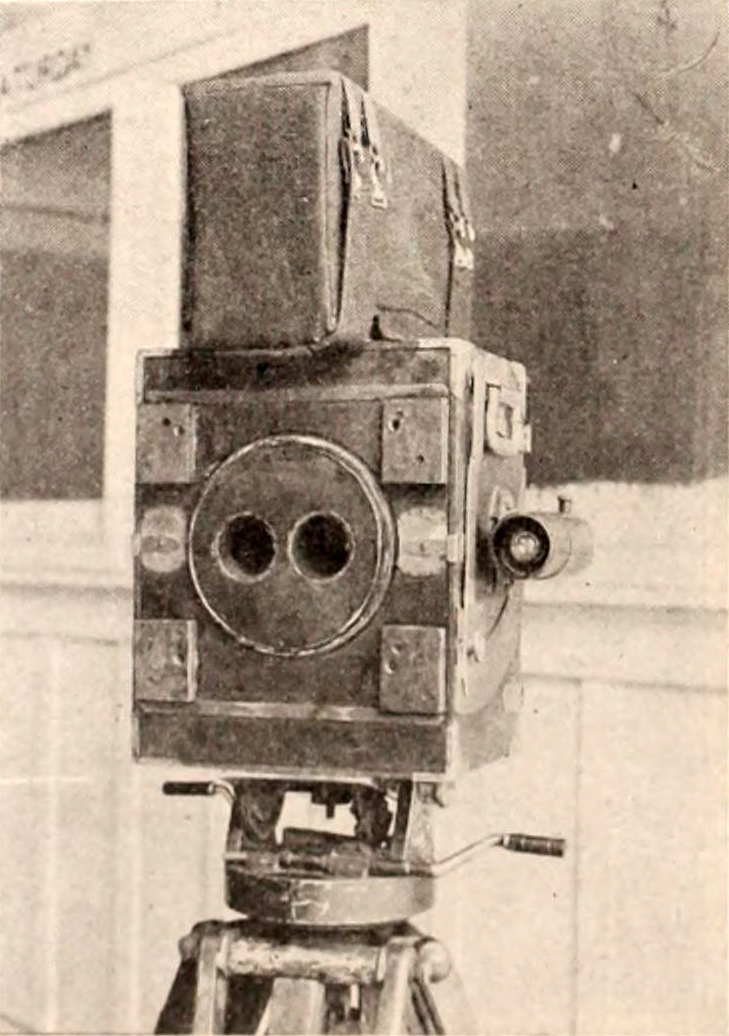
Fairall's 3D camera

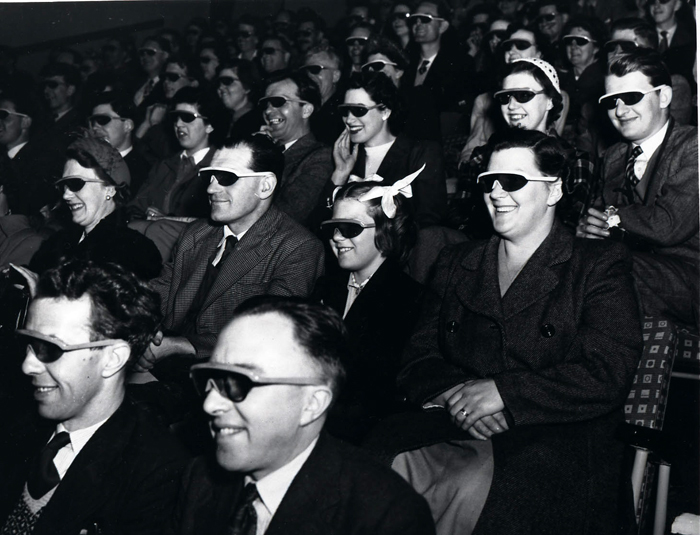
Audience wearing special glasses watch a 3D "stereoscopic film" at the Telekinema on the South Bank in London during the Festival of Britain 1951.

The earliest confirmed 3D film shown to an out-of-house audience was The Power of Love, which premiered at the Ambassador Hotel Theater in Los Angeles on September 27, 1922. The camera rig was a product of the film's producer, Harry K. Fairall, and cinematographer Robert F. Elder. It was filmed dual-strip in black and white, and single strip color anaglyphic release prints were produced using a color film invented and patented by Harry K. Fairall. A single projector could be used to display the movie but anaglyph glasses were used for viewing. The camera system and special color release print film all received U.S Patent No. 1,784,515 on December 9, 1930. After a preview for exhibitors and press in New York City, the film dropped out of sight, apparently not booked by exhibitors, and is now considered lost.

Early in December 1922, William Van Doren Kelley, inventor of the Prizma color system, cashed in on the growing interest in 3D films started by Fairall's demonstration and shot footage with a camera system of his own design. Kelley then struck a deal with Samuel "Roxy" Rothafel to premiere the first in his series of "Plasticon" shorts entitled Movies of the Future at the Rivoli Theater in New York City.

Also in December 1922, Laurens Hammond (later inventor of the Hammond organ) premiered his Teleview system, which had been shown to the trade and press in October. Teleview was the first alternating-frame 3D system seen by the public. Using left-eye and right-eye prints and two interlocked projectors, left and right frames were alternately projected, each pair being shown three times to suppress flicker. Viewing devices attached to the armrests of the theater seats had rotary shutters that operated synchronously with the projector shutters, producing a clean and clear stereoscopic result. The only theater known to have installed Teleview was the Selwyn Theater in New York City, and only one show was ever presented with it: a group of short films, an exhibition of live 3D shadows, and M.A.R.S., the only Teleview feature. The show ran for several weeks, apparently doing good business as a novelty (M.A.R.S. itself got poor reviews), but Teleview was never seen again.

In 1922, Frederic Eugene Ives and Jacob Leventhal began releasing their first stereoscopic shorts made over a three-year period. The first film, entitled Plastigrams, was distributed nationally by Educational Pictures in the red-and-blue anaglyph format. Ives and Leventhal then went on to produce the following stereoscopic shorts in the "Stereoscopiks Series" released by Pathé Films in 1925: Zowie (April 10), Luna-cy! (May 18), The Run-Away Taxi (December 17) and Ouch (December 17). On September 22, 1924, Luna-cy! was re-released in the De Forest Phonofilm sound-on-film system.

The late 1920s to early 1930s saw little interest in stereoscopic pictures. In Paris, Louis Lumiere shot footage with his stereoscopic camera in September 1933. The following March he exhibited a remake of his 1895 short film L'Arrivée du Train, this time in anaglyphic 3D, at a meeting of the French Academy of Science.

In 1936, Leventhal and John Norling were hired based on their test footage to film MGM's Audioscopiks series. The prints were by Technicolor in the red-and-green anaglyph format, and were narrated by Pete Smith. The first film, Audioscopiks, premiered January 11, 1936, and The New Audioscopiks premiered January 15, 1938. Audioscopiks was nominated for the Academy Award in the category Best Short Subject, Novelty in 1936.

With the success of the two Audioscopiks films, MGM produced one more short in anaglyph 3D, another Pete Smith Specialty called Third Dimensional Murder (1941). Unlike its predecessors, this short was shot with a studio-built camera rig. Prints were by Technicolor in red-and-blue anaglyph. The short is notable for being one of the few live-action appearances of the Frankenstein Monster as conceived by Jack Pierce for Universal Studios outside of their company.

While many of these films were printed by color systems, none of them was actually in color, and the use of the color printing was only to achieve an anaglyph effect.

==== Introduction of Polaroid ====
While attending Harvard University, Edwin H. Land conceived the idea of reducing glare by polarizing light. He took a leave of absence from Harvard to set up a lab and by 1929 had invented and patented a polarizing sheet. In 1932, he introduced Polaroid J Sheet as a commercial product. While his original intention was to create a filter for reducing glare from car headlights, Land did not underestimate the utility of his newly dubbed Polaroid filters in stereoscopic presentations.

In February 1936, Land gave the first public demonstration of Polaroid filters in conjunction with 3D photography at the Waldorf-Astoria Hotel. The reaction was enthusiastic, and Land followed it up with an installation at the New York Museum of Science. It is unknown what film was run for audiences at this exhibition.

Using Polaroid filters meant an entirely new form of projection, however. Two prints, each carrying either the right or left eye view, had to be synced up in projection using an external selsyn motor. Furthermore, polarized light would be largely depolarized by a matte white screen, and only a silver screen or screen made of other reflective material would correctly reflect the separate images.

Later that year, the feature, Nozze Vagabonde appeared in Italy, followed in Germany by Zum Greifen nah (You Can Nearly Touch It), and again in 1939 with Germany's Sechs Mädel rollen ins Wochenend (Six Girls Drive Into the Weekend). The Italian film was made with the Gualtierotti camera; the two German productions with the Zeiss camera and the Vierling shooting system. All of these films were the first exhibited using Polaroid filters. The Zeiss Company in Germany manufactured glasses on a commercial basis commencing in 1936; they were also independently made around the same time in Germany by E. Käsemann and by J. Mahler.

In 1939, John Norling shot In Tune With Tomorrow, the first commercial 3D film using Polaroid in the US. This short premiered at the 1939 New York World's Fair and was created specifically for the Chrysler Motors Pavilion. In it, a full 1939 Chrysler Plymouth is magically put together, set to music. Originally in black and white, the film was so popular that it was re-shot in color for the following year at the fair, under the title New Dimensions. In 1953, it was reissued by RKO as Motor Rhythm.

Another early short that utilized the Polaroid 3D process was 1940's Magic Movies: Thrills For You produced by the Pennsylvania Railroad Co. for the Golden Gate International Exposition. Produced by John Norling, it was filmed by Jacob Leventhal using his own rig. It consisted of shots of various views that could be seen from the Pennsylvania Railroad's trains.

In the 1940s, World War II prioritized military applications of stereoscopic photography and it once again went on the back burner in most producers' minds.

=== The "golden era" (1952–1954) ===
What aficionados consider the "golden era" of 3D began in late 1952 with the release of the first color stereoscopic feature, Bwana Devil, produced, written and directed by Arch Oboler. The film was shot in "Natural Vision", a process that was co-created and controlled by M. L. Gunzberg. Gunzberg, who built the rig with his brother Julian, Friend Baker and Lothrop Worth, shopped it without success to various studios before Oboler used it for this feature, which went into production with the title, The Lions of Gulu. The critically panned film was nevertheless highly successful with audiences due to the novelty of 3D, which increased Hollywood interest in 3D during a period that had seen declining box-office admissions.

As with practically all of the features made during this boom, Bwana Devil was projected dual-strip, with Polaroid filters. During the 1950s, the familiar disposable anaglyph glasses made of cardboard were mainly used for comic books, two shorts by exploitation specialist Dan Sonney, and three shorts produced by Lippert Productions. However, even the Lippert shorts were available in the dual-strip format alternatively.

Because the features utilized two projectors, the capacity limit of film being loaded onto each projector (about 6,000 feet (1,800 m), or an hour's worth of film) meant that an intermission was necessary for every feature-length film. Quite often, intermission points were written into the script at a major plot point.

During Christmas of 1952, producer Sol Lesser quickly premiered the dual-strip showcase called Stereo Techniques in Chicago. Lesser acquired the rights to five dual-strip shorts. Two of them, Now is the Time (to Put On Your Glasses) and Around is Around, were directed by Norman McLaren in 1951 for the National Film Board of Canada. The other three films were produced in Britain for The Festival of Britain in 1951 by Raymond Spottiswoode. These were A Solid Explanation, Royal River, and The Black Swan.

James Mage was also an early pioneer in the 3D craze. Using his 16 mm 3D Bolex system, he premiered his Triorama program on February 10, 1953, with his four shorts: Sunday In Stereo, Indian Summer, American Life, and This is Bolex Stereo. This show is considered lost.

Another early 3D film during the boom was the Lippert Productions short A Day in the Country, narrated by Joe Besser, which was composed mostly of test footage. Unlike all of the other Lippert shorts, which were available in both dual-strip and anaglyph, this production was released in anaglyph only.

April 1953 saw two groundbreaking features in 3D: Columbia's Man in the Dark and Warner Bros.' House of Wax, the first 3D feature with stereophonic sound. House of Wax was (outside of Cinerama) the first time many American audiences heard recorded stereophonic sound; it was also the film that typecast Vincent Price as a horror star as well as the "King of 3-D" after he became the actor to star in the most 3D features (the others were The Mad Magician, Dangerous Mission, and Son of Sinbad). The success of these two films proved that major studios now had a method of getting filmgoers back into theaters and away from television sets, which were causing a steady decline in attendance.

Universal-International released its first 3D feature, It Came from Outer Space, on May 27, 1953, with stereophonic sound. That was followed by Paramount's first 3D feature, Sangaree with Fernando Lamas and Arlene Dahl.

The Walt Disney Studios entered 3D with its May 28, 1953, release of Melody, which accompanied the first 3D western, Columbia's Fort Ti at its Los Angeles opening. It was later shown at Disneyland's Fantasyland Theater in 1957 as part of a program with Disney's other short Working for Peanuts, entitled, 3-D Jamboree. The show was hosted by the Mousketeers and was in color.

Columbia released several 3D westerns produced by Sam Katzman and directed by William Castle. Castle would later specialize in various technical in-theater gimmicks for such Columbia and Allied Artists features as 13 Ghosts, House on Haunted Hill, and The Tingler. Columbia also produced the only slapstick comedies conceived for 3D. The Three Stooges starred in Spooks and Pardon My Backfire; dialect comic Harry Mimmo starred in Down the Hatch. Producer Jules White was optimistic about the possibilities of 3D as applied to slapstick (with pies and other projectiles aimed at the audience), but only two of his stereoscopic shorts were shown in 3D. Down the Hatch was released as a conventional, "flat" motion picture. (Columbia has since printed Down the Hatch in 3D for film festivals.)

John Ireland, Joanne Dru and Macdonald Carey starred in the Jack Broder color production Hannah Lee, which premiered on June 19, 1953. The film was directed by Ireland, who sued Broder for his salary. Broder counter-sued, claiming that Ireland went over production costs with the film.

Another famous entry in the golden era of 3D was the 3 Dimensional Pictures production of Robot Monster. The film was allegedly scribed in an hour by screenwriter Wyott Ordung and filmed in a period of two weeks on a shoestring budget. Despite these shortcomings and the crew's lack of previous experience with the newly built camera rig, luck was on the cinematographer's side, as many find the 3D photography in the film is well shot and aligned. Robot Monster also has a notable score by then up-and-coming composer Elmer Bernstein. The film was released June 24, 1953, and went out with the short Stardust in Your Eyes, which starred nightclub comedian, Slick Slavin.

20th Century Fox produced its only 3D feature, Inferno, in 1953, starring Rhonda Fleming. Fleming, who also starred in Those Redheads From Seattle, and Jivaro, shares the spot for being the actress to appear in the most 3D features with Patricia Medina, who starred in Sangaree, Phantom of the Rue Morgue and Drums of Tahiti. Darryl F. Zanuck expressed little interest in stereoscopic systems, and at that point was preparing to premiere the new widescreen film system, CinemaScope.

The first decline in the theatrical 3D craze started in August and September 1953. The factors causing this decline were:

- Two prints had to be projected simultaneously.
- The prints had to remain exactly alike after repair, or synchronization would be lost.
- It sometimes required two projectionists to keep sync working properly.
- When either prints or shutters became out of sync, even for a single frame, the picture became virtually unwatchable and accounted for headaches and eyestrain.
- The necessary silver projection screen was very directional and caused sideline seating to be unusable with both 3D and regular films, due to the angular darkening of these screens. Later films that opened in wider-seated venues often premiered flat for that reason (such as Kiss Me Kate at the Radio City Music Hall).
- A mandatory intermission was needed to properly prepare the theater's projectors for the showing of the second half of the film.

Because projection booth operators were at many times careless, even at preview screenings of 3D films, trade and newspaper critics claimed that certain films were "hard on the eyes."

Sol Lesser attempted to follow up Stereo Techniques with a new showcase, this time five shorts that he himself produced. The project was to be called The 3-D Follies and was to be distributed by RKO. Unfortunately, because of financial difficulties and the general loss of interest in 3D, Lesser canceled the project during the summer of 1953, making it the first 3D film to be aborted in production. Two of the three shorts were shot: Carmenesque, a burlesque number starring exotic dancer Lili St. Cyr, and Fun in the Sun, a sports short directed by famed set designer/director William Cameron Menzies, who also directed the 3D feature The Maze for Allied Artists.

Although it was more expensive to install, the major competing realism process was wide-screen, but two-dimensional, anamorphic, first utilized by Fox with CinemaScope and its September premiere in The Robe. Anamorphic films needed only a single print, so synchronization was not an issue. Cinerama was also a competitor from the start and had better quality control than 3D because it was owned by one company that focused on quality control. However, most of the 3D features past the summer of 1953 were released in the flat widescreen formats ranging from 1.66:1 to 1.85:1. In early studio advertisements and articles about widescreen and 3D formats, widescreen systems were referred to as "3D", causing some confusion among scholars.

There was no single instance of combining CinemaScope with 3D until 1960, with a film called September Storm, and even then, that was a blow-up from a non-anamorphic negative. September Storm also went out with the last dual-strip short, Space Attack, which was actually shot in 1954 under the title The Adventures of Sam Space.

In December 1953, 3D made a comeback with the release of several important 3D films, including MGM's musical Kiss Me, Kate. Kate was the hill over which 3D had to pass to survive. MGM tested it in six theaters: three in 3D and three-flat. According to trade ads of the time, the 3D version was so well-received that the film quickly went into a wide stereoscopic release. However, most publications, including Kenneth Macgowan's classic film reference book Behind the Screen, state that the film did much better as a "regular" release. The film, adapted from the popular Cole Porter Broadway musical, starred the MGM songbird team of Howard Keel and Kathryn Grayson as the leads, supported by Ann Miller, Keenan Wynn, Bobby Van, James Whitmore, Kurt Kasznar and Tommy Rall. The film also prominently promoted its use of stereophonic sound.

Several other features that helped put 3D back on the map that month were the John Wayne feature Hondo (distributed by Warner Bros.), Columbia's Miss Sadie Thompson with Rita Hayworth, and Paramount's Money From Home with Dean Martin and Jerry Lewis. Paramount also released the cartoon shorts Boo Moon with Casper, the Friendly Ghost and Popeye, Ace of Space with Popeye the Sailor. Paramount Pictures released a 3D Korean War film Cease Fire filmed on actual Korean locations in 1953.

Top Banana, based on the popular stage musical with Phil Silvers, was brought to the screen with the original cast. Although it was merely a filmed stage production, the idea was that every audience member would feel they would have the best seat in the house through color photography and 3D. Although the film was shot and edited in 3D, United Artists, the distributor, felt the production was uneconomical in stereoscopic form and released the film flat on January 27, 1954. It remains one of two "Golden era" 3D features, along with another United Artists feature, Southwest Passage (with John Ireland and Joanne Dru), that are currently considered lost (although flat versions survive).

A string of successful films filmed in 3D followed the second wave, but many were widely or exclusively shown flat. Some highlights are:

- The French Line, starring Jane Russell and Gilbert Roland, a Howard Hughes/RKO production. The film became notorious for being released without an MPAA seal of approval after several suggestive lyrics were included, as well as one of Ms. Russell's particularly revealing costumes. Playing up her sex appeal, one tagline for the film was, "It'll knock both of your eyes out!" The film was later cut and approved by the MPAA for a general flat release, despite having a wide and profitable 3D release.
- Taza, Son of Cochise, a sequel to 1950s Broken Arrow, which starred Rock Hudson in the title role, Barbara Rush as the love interest, and Rex Reason (billed as Bart Roberts) as his renegade brother. Originally released flat through Universal-International. It was directed by the great stylist Douglas Sirk, and his striking visual sense made the film a huge success when it was "re-premiered" in 3D in 2006 at the Second 3D Expo in Hollywood.
- Two ape films: Phantom of the Rue Morgue, featuring Karl Malden and Patricia Medina, produced by Warner Bros. and based on Edgar Allan Poe's "The Murders in the Rue Morgue", and Gorilla at Large, a Panoramic Production starring Cameron Mitchell, distributed flat and 3D through Fox.
- Creature from the Black Lagoon, starring Richard Carlson and Julie Adams, directed by Jack Arnold. Although arguably the most famous 3D film, it was typically seen in 3D only in large urban theaters and shown flat in the many smaller neighborhood theaters. It was the only 3D feature that spawned a 3D sequel, Revenge of the Creature, which was in turn followed by The Creature Walks Among Us, shot flat.
- Dial M for Murder, directed by Alfred Hitchcock and starring Ray Milland, Robert Cummings, and Grace Kelly, is considered by aficionados of 3D to be one of the best examples of the process. Although available in 3D in 1954, there are no known playdates in 3D, since Warner Bros. had just instated a simultaneous 3D/2D release policy. The film's screening in 3D in February 1980 at the York Theater in San Francisco did so well that Warner Bros. re-released the film in 3D in February 1982.
- Gog, the last episode in Ivan Tors' Office of Scientific Investigation (OSI) trilogy dealing with realistic science fiction (following The Magnetic Monster and Riders to the Stars). Most theaters showed it flat.
- The Diamond (released in the United States as The Diamond Wizard), a 1954 British crime film starring Dennis O'Keefe. The only stereoscopic feature shot in Britain, released flat in both the UK and US.
- Irwin Allen's Dangerous Mission released by RKO in 1954 featuring Allen's trademarks of an all-star cast facing a disaster (a forest fire). Bosley Crowther's New York Times review mentions that it was shown flat.
- Son of Sinbad, another RKO/Howard Hughes production, starring Dale Robertson, Lili St. Cyr, and Vincent Price. The film was shelved after Hughes ran into difficulty with The French Line, and was not released until 1955, at which time it went out flat, converted to the SuperScope process.

3D's final decline was in the late spring of 1954, for the same reasons as the previous lull, as well as the further success of widescreen formats with theater operators. Even though Polaroid had created a well-designed "Tell-Tale Filter Kit" for the purpose of recognizing and adjusting out of sync and phase 3D, exhibitors still felt uncomfortable with the system and turned their focus instead to processes such as CinemaScope. The last 3D feature to be released in that format during the "Golden era" was Revenge of the Creature, on February 23, 1955. Ironically, the film had a wide release in 3D and was well received at the box office.

=== Revival (1960–1984) in single strip format ===
Stereoscopic films largely remained dormant for the first part of the 1960s, with those that were released usually being anaglyph exploitation films. One film of notoriety was the Beaver-Champion/Warner Bros. production, The Mask (1961). The film was shot in 2-D, but to enhance the bizarre qualities of the dream-world that is induced when the main character puts on a cursed tribal mask, these scenes went to anaglyph 3D. These scenes were printed by Technicolor on their first run in red/green anaglyph.

Although 3D films appeared sparsely during the early 1960s, the true second wave of 3D cinema was set into motion by Arch Oboler, the producer who had started the craze of the 1950s. Using a new technology called Space-Vision 3D. The origin of "Space-Vision 3D" goes back to Colonel Robert Vincent Bernier, a forgotten innovator in the history of stereoscopic motion pictures. His Trioptiscope Space-Vision lens was the gold standard for the production and exhibition of 3D films for nearly 30 years. "Space-Vision 3D" stereoscopic films were printed with two images, one above the other, in a single academy ratio frame, on a single strip, and needed only one projector fitted with a special lens. This so-called "over and under" technique eliminated the need for dual projector set-ups, and produced widescreen, but darker, less vivid, polarized 3D images. Unlike earlier dual systems, it could stay in perfect synchronization, unless improperly spliced in repair.

Arch Oboler once again had the vision for the system that no one else would touch, and put it to use on his film entitled The Bubble, which starred Michael Cole, Deborah Walley, and Johnny Desmond. As with Bwana Devil, the critics panned The Bubble, but audiences flocked to see it, and it became financially sound enough to promote the use of the system to other studios, particularly independents, who did not have the money for expensive dual-strip prints of their productions.

In 1970, Stereovision, a new entity founded by director/inventor Allan Silliphant and optical designer Chris Condon, developed a different 35 mm single-strip format, which printed two images squeezed side by side and used an anamorphic lens to widen the pictures through Polaroid filters. Louis K. Sher (Sherpix) and Stereovision released the softcore sex comedy The Stewardesses (self-rated X, but later re-rated R by the MPAA). The film cost US$100,000 to produce, and ran for months in several markets. eventually earning $27 million in North America, alone ($140 million in constant-2010 dollars) in fewer than 800 theaters, becoming the most profitable 3D film to date, and in purely relative terms, one of the most profitable films ever. It was later released in 70 mm 3D. Some 36 films worldwide were made with Stereovision over 25 years, using either a widescreen (above-below), anamorphic (side by side) or 70 mm 3D formats. In 2009 The Stewardesses was remastered by Chris Condon and director Ed Meyer, releasing it in XpanD 3D, RealD 3D and Dolby 3D.

The quality of the 1970s 3D films was not much more inventive, as many were either softcore and even hardcore adult films, horror films, or a combination of both. Paul Morrisey's Flesh For Frankenstein (aka Andy Warhol's Frankenstein) was a superlative example of such a combination.

Between 1981 and 1983 there was a new Hollywood 3D craze started by the spaghetti western Comin' at Ya!. When Parasite was released it was billed as the first horror film to come out in 3D in over 20 years. Horror films and reissues of 1950s 3D classics (such as Hitchcock's Dial M for Murder) dominated the 3D releases that followed. The second sequel in the Friday the 13th series, Friday the 13th Part III, was released very successfully. Apparently saying "part 3 in 3D" was considered too cumbersome so it was shortened in the titles of Jaws 3-D and Amityville 3-D, which emphasized the screen effects to the point of being annoying at times, especially when flashlights were shone into the eyes of the audience.

The science fiction film Spacehunter: Adventures in the Forbidden Zone was the most expensive 3D film made up to that point with production costs about the same as Star Wars but not nearly the same box office success, causing the craze to fade quickly through spring 1983. Other sci-fi/fantasy films were released as well including Metalstorm: The Destruction of Jared-Syn and Treasure of the Four Crowns, which was widely criticized for poor editing and plot holes, but did feature some truly spectacular closeups.

3D releases after the second craze included The Man Who Wasn't There (1983), Silent Madness and the 1985 animated film Starchaser: The Legend of Orin, whose plot seemed to borrow heavily from Star Wars.

Only Comin' At Ya!, Parasite, and Friday the 13th Part III have been officially released on VHS and/or DVD in 3D in the United States (although Amityville 3D has seen a 3D DVD release in the United Kingdom). Most of the 1980s 3D films and some of the classic 1950s films such as House of Wax were released on the now defunct Video Disc (VHD) format in Japan as part of a system that used shutter glasses. Most of these have been unofficially transferred to DVD and are available on the grey market through sites such as eBay.

Stereoscopic movies were also popular in other parts of the world, such as My Dear Kuttichathan, a Malayalam film which was shot with stereoscopic 3D and released in 1984.

=== Rebirth of 3D (1985–2003) ===
In the mid-1980s, IMAX began producing non-fiction films for its nascent 3D business, starting with We Are Born of Stars (Roman Kroitor, 1985). A key point was that this production, as with all subsequent IMAX productions, emphasized mathematical correctness of the 3D rendition and thus largely eliminated the eye fatigue and pain that resulted from the approximate geometries of previous 3D incarnations. In addition, and in contrast to previous 35mm-based 3D presentations, the very large field of view provided by IMAX allowed a much broader 3D "stage", arguably as important in 3D film as it is theatre.

The Walt Disney Company also began more prominent use of 3D films in special venues to impress audiences with Magic Journeys (1982) and Captain EO (Francis Ford Coppola, 1986, starring Michael Jackson) being notable examples. In the same year, the National Film Board of Canada production Transitions (Colin Low), created for Expo 86 in Vancouver, was the first IMAX presentation using polarized glasses. Echoes of the Sun (Roman Kroitor, 1990) was the first IMAX film to be presented using alternate-eye shutterglass technology, a development required because the dome screen precluded the use of polarized technology.

From 1990 onward, numerous films were produced by all three parties to satisfy the demands of their various high-profile special attractions and IMAX's expanding 3D network. Films of special note during this period include the extremely successful Into the Deep (Graeme Ferguson, 1995) and the first IMAX 3D fiction film Wings of Courage (1996), by director Jean-Jacques Annaud, about the pilot Henri Guillaumet.

Other stereoscopic films produced in this period include:

- The Last Buffalo (Stephen Low, 1990)
- Jim Henson's Muppet*Vision 3D (Jim Henson, 1991)
- Imagine (John Weiley, 1993)
- Honey, I Shrunk the Audience (Daniel Rustuccio, 1994)
- Into the Deep (Graeme Ferguson, 1995)
- Across the Sea of Time (Stephen Low, 1995)
- Wings of Courage (Jean-Jacques Annaud, 1996)
- L5, First City in Space (Graeme Ferguson, 1996)
- T2 3-D: Battle Across Time (James Cameron, 1996)
- Paint Misbehavin (Roman Kroitor and Peter Stephenson, 1997)
- IMAX Nutcracker (1997)
- The Hidden Dimension (1997)
- T-Rex: Back to the Cretaceous (Brett Leonard, 1998)
- Mark Twain's America (Stephen Low, 1998)
- Siegfried & Roy: The Magic Box (Brett Leonard, 1999)
- Galapagos (Al Giddings and David Clark, 1999)
- Encounter in the Third Dimension (Ben Stassen, 1999)
- Alien Adventure (Ben Stassen, 1999)
- Ultimate G's (2000)
- CyberWorld (Hugh Murray, 2000)
- Cirque du Soleil: Journey of Man (Keith Melton, 2000)
- Haunted Castle (Ben Stassen, 2001)
- Panda Vision (Ben Stassen, 2001)
- Space Station 3D (Toni Myers, 2002)
- SOS Planet (Ben Stassen, 2002)
- Ocean Wonderland (2003)
- Falling in Love Again (Munro Ferguson, 2003)
- Misadventures in 3D (Ben Stassen, 2003)

By 2004, 54% of IMAX theaters (133 of 248) were capable of showing 3D films.

Shortly thereafter, higher quality computer animation, competition from DVDs and other media, digital projection, digital video capture, and the use of sophisticated IMAX 70mm film projectors, created an opportunity for another wave of 3D films.

=== Mainstream resurgence (2003–2010) ===
In 2003, Ghosts of the Abyss by James Cameron was released as the first full-length 3D IMAX feature filmed with the Reality Camera System. This camera system used the latest HD video cameras, not film, and was built for Cameron by Vince Pace, to his specifications. The same camera system was used to film Spy Kids 3-D: Game Over (2003), Aliens of the Deep IMAX (2005), and The Adventures of Sharkboy and Lavagirl in 3-D (2005).

In 2004, Las Vegas Hilton released Star Trek: The Experience which included two films. One of the films, Borg Invasion 4-D (Ty Granoroli), was in 3D. In August of the same year, rap group Insane Clown Posse released their ninth studio album Hell's Pit. One of two versions of the album contained a DVD featuring a 3D short film for the track "Bowling Balls", shot in high-definition video.

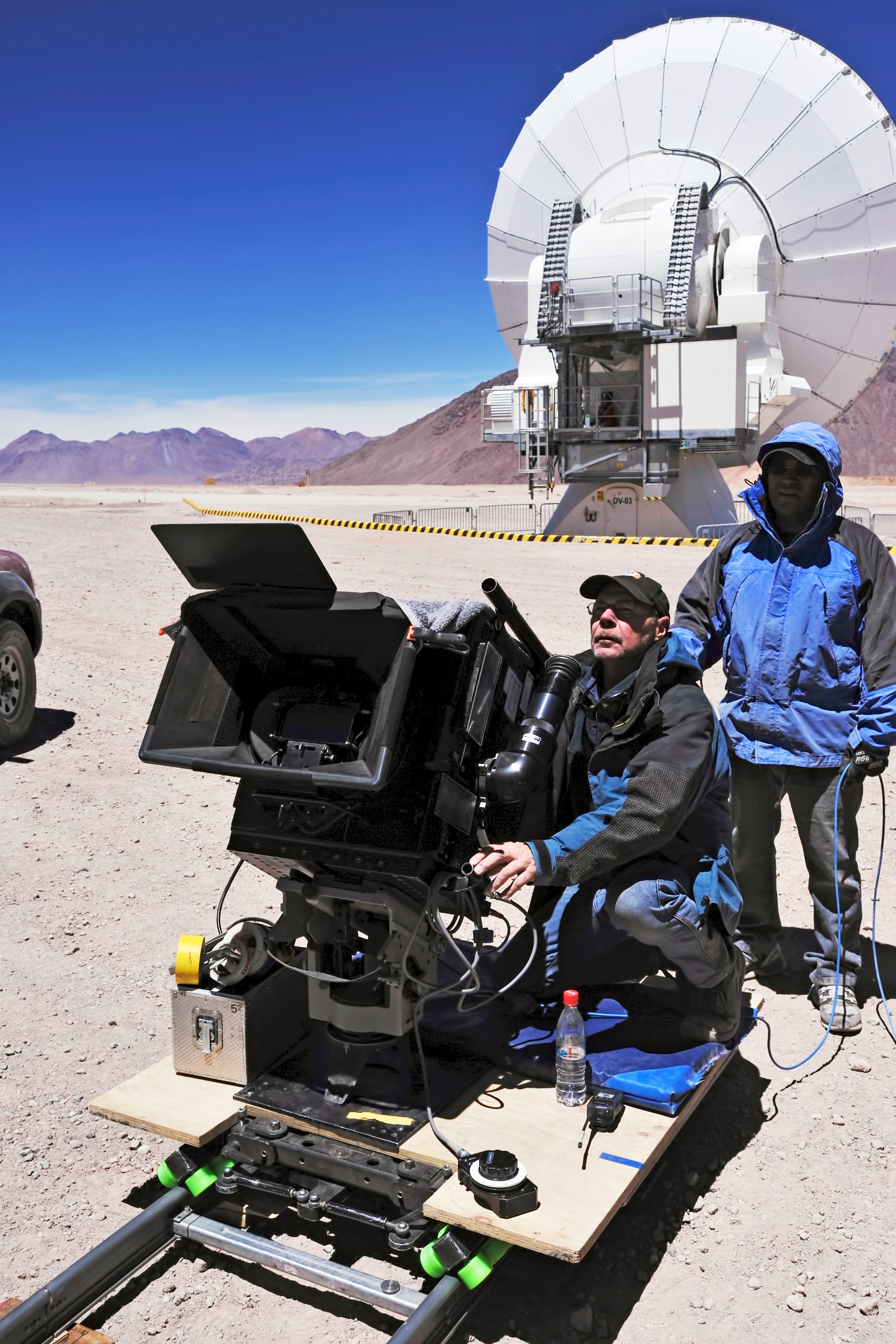
Shooting of the film Hidden Universe 3D with IMAX camera.

In November 2004, The Polar Express was released as IMAX's first full-length, animated 3D feature. It was released in 3,584 theaters in 2D, and only 66 IMAX locations. The return from those few 3D theaters was about 25% of the total. The 3D version earned about 14 times as much per screen as the 2D version. This pattern continued and prompted a greatly intensified interest in 3D and 3D presentation of animated films.

In June 2005, the Mann's Chinese 6 theatre in Hollywood became the first commercial film theatre to be equipped with the Digital 3D format. Both Singin' in the Rain and The Polar Express were tested in the Digital 3D format over the course of several months. In November 2005, Walt Disney Pictures released Chicken Little in Digital 3D format.

The Butler's in Love, a short film directed by David Arquette and starring Elizabeth Berkley and Thomas Jane was released on June 23, 2008. The film was shot at the former Industrial Light & Magic studios using KernerFX's prototype Kernercam stereoscopic camera rig.

Ben Walters suggested in 2009 that both filmmakers and film exhibitors regain interest in 3D film. There was more 3D exhibition equipment, and more dramatic films being shot in 3D format. One incentive is that the technology is more mature. Shooting in 3D format is less limited, and the result is more stable. Another incentive was that while 2D ticket sales were in an overall state of decline, revenues from 3D tickets continued to grow at the time.

Through the entire history of 3D presentations, techniques to convert existing 2D images for 3D presentation have existed. Few have been effective or survived. The combination of digital and digitized source material with relatively cost-effective digital post-processing has spawned a new wave of conversion products. In June 2006, IMAX and Warner Bros. released Superman Returns including 20 minutes of 3D images converted from the 2D original digital footage. George Lucas announced that he would re-release his Star Wars films in 3D based on a conversion process from the company In-Three. Later on in 2011, it was announced that Lucas was working with the company Prime Focus on this conversion.

In late 2005, Steven Spielberg told the press he was involved in patenting a 3D cinema system that did not need glasses, based on plasma screens. A computer splits each film-frame, and then projects the two split images onto the screen at differing angles, to be picked up by tiny angled ridges on the screen.

Animated films Open Season, and The Ant Bully, were released in analog 3D in 2006. Monster House and The Nightmare Before Christmas were released on XpanD 3D, RealD 3D and Dolby 3D systems in 2006.

On May 19, 2007 Scar3D opened at the Cannes Film Market. It was the first US-produced 3D full-length feature film to be completed in RealD 3D. It has been the #1 film at the box office in several countries around the world, including Russia where it opened in 3D on 295 screens.

On January 19, 2008, U2 3D was released; it was the first live-action digital 3D film. In the same year others 3D films included Hannah Montana & Miley Cyrus: Best of Both Worlds Concert, Journey to the Center of the Earth, and Bolt.

On January 16, 2009, Lionsgate released My Bloody Valentine 3D, the first horror film and first R-rated film to be projected in RealD 3D. It was released to 1,033 3D screens, the most ever for this format, and 1,501 regular screens. Another R-rated film, The Final Destination, was released later that year in August on even more screens. It was the first of its series to be released in HD 3D. Major 3D films in 2009 included Coraline, Monsters vs. Aliens, Up, X Games 3D: The Movie, The Final Destination, Disney's A Christmas Carol, and Avatar. Avatar has gone on to be one of the most expensive films of all time, with a budget at $237 million; it is also the highest-grossing film of all time. The main technologies used to exhibit these films, and many others released around the time and up to the present, are RealD 3D, Dolby 3D, XpanD 3D, MasterImage 3D, and IMAX 3D. The success of the film also led to electronics manufacturers releasing 3D televisions and caused 3D films to increase in popularity.

March and April 2010 saw three major 3D releases clustered together, with Alice in Wonderland hitting US theaters on March 5, 2010, How to Train Your Dragon on March 26, 2010, and Clash of the Titans on April 2, 2010. On May 13 of the same year, China's first IMAX 3D film started shooting. The pre-production of the first 3D film shot in France, Derrière les murs, began in May 2010 and was released in mid-2011.

On October 1, 2010 Scar3D was the first-ever stereoscopic 3D Video-on-demand film released through major cable broadcasters for 3D televisions in the United States. Released in the United States on May 21, 2010, Shrek Forever After by DreamWorks Animation (Paramount Pictures) used the RealD 3D system, also released in IMAX 3D.

==== World 3-D Expositions ====
In September 2003, Sabucat Productions organized the first World 3-D Exposition, celebrating the 50th anniversary of the original craze. The Expo was held at Grauman's Egyptian Theatre. During the two-week festival, over 30 of the 50 "golden era" stereoscopic features (as well as shorts) were screened, many coming from the collection of film historian and archivist Robert Furmanek, who had spent the previous 15 years painstakingly tracking down and preserving each film to its original glory. In attendance were many stars from each film, respectively, and some were moved to tears by the sold-out seating with audiences of film buffs from all over the world who came to remember their previous glories.

In May 2006, the second World 3-D Exposition was announced for September of that year, presented by the 3-D Film Preservation Fund. Along with the favorites of the previous exposition were newly discovered features and shorts, and like the previous Expo, guests from each film. Expo II was announced as being the locale for the world premiere of several films never before seen in 3D, including The Diamond Wizard and the Universal short, Hawaiian Nights with Mamie Van Doren and Pinky Lee. Other "re-premieres" of films not seen since their original release in stereoscopic form included Cease Fire!, Taza, Son of Cochise, Wings of the Hawk, and Those Redheads From Seattle. Also shown were the long-lost shorts Carmenesque and A Day in the Country (both 1953) and William Van Doren Kelley's two Plasticon shorts (1922 and 1923).

=== Audience decline in theaters & 3D streaming (2011–present) ===
In the wake of its initial popularity and corresponding increase in the number of screens, more films were being released in the 3D format, yet fewer people were choosing to see them in such a way. For instance, only 45% of the premiere weekend box office earnings of Kung Fu Panda 2 in 2011 came from 3D screenings as opposed to 60% for Shrek Forever After in 2010. In addition, the premiere of Cars 2 opening weekend gross consisted of only 37% from 3D theatres. Harry Potter and the Deathly Hallows – Part 2 and Captain America: The First Avenger were major releases that achieved similar percentages: 43% and 40% respectively. In view of this trend, there has been box office analysis concluding the implementation of 3D presentation is apparently backfiring by discouraging people from going to film theatres at all. As Brandon Gray of Box Office Mojo notes, "In each case, 3D's more-money-from-fewer-people approach has simply led to less money from even fewer people." Parallel, the number of televisions sold with support for 3D television has dropped, let alone those sold with actual 3D goggles.

According to the Motion Picture Association of America, despite a record total of 47 3D films being released in 2011, the overall domestic box office receipts were down 18% to $1.8 billion from $2.2 billion in 2010. Although revenues as a whole increased during 2012, the bulk has so far come from 2D presentations as exemplified by little over 50% of filmgoers opting to see the likes of The Avengers and 32% choosing Brave in their 3D versions. Conflicting reasons are respectively offered by studios and exhibitors: whereas the former blame more expensive 3D ticket prices, the latter argue that the quality of films in general is at fault. However, despite the perceived decline of 3D in the U.S. market, studio chiefs in 2012 were optimistic of better receipts internationally, where there still appeared to be a strong appetite for the format.

Studios are also using 3D to generate additional income from films that are already commercially successful. Such re-releases usually involve a conversion from 2D. For example, Disney has reissued both The Lion King and Beauty and the Beast, with plans to add some of its other well-known titles. Titanic has also been modified for 3D, and there are also plans to similarly present all six Star Wars films.

Jeffrey Katzenberg, a producer of 3D films and one of the leading proponents of the format, blames oversaturation of the market with inferior films, especially ones photographed conventionally and then digitally processed in post-production. He claims that such films have led audiences to conclude that the format is not worth the often much higher ticket price. Daniel Engber, a columnist for Slate, comes to a similar conclusion: "What happened to 3-D? It may have died from a case of acute septicemia—too much crap in the system."

Film critic Mark Kermode, a noted detractor of 3D, has surmised that there is an emerging policy of distributors to limit the availability of 2D versions, thus "railroading" the 3D format into cinemas whether the paying filmgoer likes it or not. This was especially prevalent during the release of Prometheus in 2012, where only 30% of prints for theatrical exhibition (at least in the UK) were in 2D. His suspicions were later reinforced by a substantial number of complaints about Dredd from those who wished to see it in 2D but were denied the opportunity. In July 2017, IMAX announced that they would begin to focus on screening more Hollywood tentpole movies in 2D (even if there's a 3D version) and have fewer 3D screenings of movies in North America, citing that moviegoers in North America prefer 2D films over 3D films.

In 2024, 3D films in 4K HDR became available to home media for the first time, with the launch of the visionOS operating system offering two services to access movies in such formats: Apple TV and Disney+. Some films were also offered in high frame rate (48fps), such as Avatar: The Way of Water. Other 3D media shot in 8K with a 180-degree view was also made available under the moniker "Apple Immersive Video."

In 2025, 3D films became available to Android XR devices via the Google TV service, starting with the Samsung Galaxy XR.

== Techniques ==
Stereoscopic motion pictures can be produced through a variety of different methods. Over the years the popularity of systems being widely employed in film theaters has waxed and waned. Though anaglyph was sometimes used prior to 1948, during the early "Golden Era" of 3D cinematography of the 1950s the polarization system was used for every single feature-length film in the United States, and all but one short film. In the 21st century, polarization 3D systems have continued to dominate the scene, though during the 1960s and 1970s some classic films which were converted to anaglyph for theaters not equipped for polarization, and were even shown in 3D on television. In the years following the mid-1980s, some films were made with short segments in anaglyph 3D. The following are some of the technical details and methodologies employed in some of the more notable 3D film systems that have been developed.

=== Producing 3D films ===
==== Live action ====
The standard for shooting live-action films in 3D involves using two cameras mounted so that their lenses are about as far apart from each other as the average pair of human eyes, recording two separate images for both the left eye and the right eye. In principle, two normal 2D cameras could be put side-to-side but this is problematic in many ways. The only real option is to invest in new stereoscopic cameras. Moreover, some cinematographic tricks that are simple with a 2D camera become impossible when filming in 3D. This means those otherwise cheap tricks need to be replaced by expensive CGI.

In 2008, Journey to the Center of the Earth became the first live-action feature film to be shot with the earliest Fusion Camera System released in Digital 3D and was later followed by several others. Avatar (2009) was shot in a 3D process that is based on how the human eye looks at an image. It was an improvement to the existing 3D camera system. Many 3D camera rigs still in use simply pair two cameras side by side, while newer rigs are paired with a beam splitter or both camera lenses built into one unit. While Digital Cinema cameras are not a requirement for 3D they are the predominant medium for most of what is photographed. Film options include IMAX 3D and Cine 160.

==== Animation ====
In the 1930s and 1940s, the Fleischer Studios made several cartoons with extensive stereoscopic 3D backgrounds, including several Popeye the Sailor, Betty Boop, and Superman cartoons.

In the early to mid-1950s, only half of the major Animation film studios operation experimented with creating traditional 3D animated short subjects. The Walt Disney Studio produced two traditionally animated shorts in stereoscopic 3D, for cinemas. Adventures in Music: Melody (1953), and the Donald Duck cartoon Working for Peanuts (1953). Warner Bros. Cartoons only produced a single cartoon in 3D: Lumber Jack-Rabbit (1953) starring Bugs Bunny. Famous Studios produced two cartoons in 3D, the Popeye cartoon Popeye, the Ace of Space (1953), and the Casper the Friendly Ghost cartoon Boo Moon (1954). Walter Lantz Productions produced the Woody Woodpecker cartoon Hypnotic Hick (1953), which was distributed by Universal.

From the late 1950s until the mid-2000s almost no animation was produced for 3D display in theaters. Although several films used 3D backgrounds. One exception is Starchaser: The Legend of Orin.

CGI animated films can be rendered as stereoscopic 3D version by using two virtual cameras. Stop-motion animated 3D films are photographed with two cameras similar to live action 3D films.

In 2004, The Polar Express was the first stereoscopic 3D computer-animated feature film. The 3D version was solely released in IMAX theaters. In November 2005, Walt Disney Pictures released Chicken Little in Digital 3D format, being Disney's first computer-animated film in 3D. The film was converted from 2D into 3D in post-production. nWave Pictures' Fly Me to the Moon (2008) was actually the first animated film created for 3D and released exclusively in 3D in digital theaters around the world. No other animation films have released solely in 3D since. The first 3D feature by DreamWorks Animation, Monsters vs. Aliens, followed in 2009 and used a new digital rendering process called InTru3D, which was developed by Intel to create more realistic animated 3D images. InTru3D is not used to exhibit 3D films in theaters; they are shown in either RealD 3D or IMAX 3D.

==== 2D to 3D conversion ====
In the case of 2D CGI animated films that were generated from 3D models, it is possible to return to the models to generate a 3D version.

For all other 2D films, different techniques must be employed. For example, for the 3D re-release of the 1993 film The Nightmare Before Christmas, Walt Disney Pictures scanned each original frame and manipulated them to produce left-eye and right-eye versions. Dozens of films have now been converted from 2D to 3D. There are several approaches used for 2D to 3D conversion, most notably depth-based methods.

However, conversion to 3D has problems. Information is unavailable as 2D does not have information for a perspective view. Some TVs have a 3D engine to convert 2D content to 3D. Usually, on high frame rate content (and on some slower processors even normal frame rate) the processor is not fast enough and lag is possible. This can lead to strange visual effects.

=== Displaying 3D films ===
==== Anaglyph ====
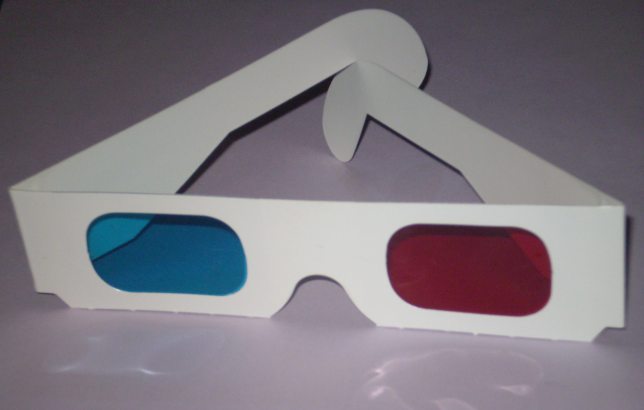
The traditional 3D glasses, with modern red and cyan color filters, similar to the red/green and red/blue lenses used to view early anaglyph films.

Anaglyph images were the earliest method of presenting theatrical 3D, and the one most commonly associated with stereoscopy by the public at large, mostly because of non-theatrical 3D media such as comic books and 3D television broadcasts, where polarization is not practical. They were made popular because of the ease of their production and exhibition. The first anaglyph film was invented in 1915 by Edwin S Porter. Though the earliest theatrical presentations were done with this system, most 3D films from the 1950s and 1980s were originally shown polarized.

In an anaglyph, the two images are superimposed in an additive light setting through two filters, one red and one cyan. In a subtractive light setting, the two images are printed in the same complementary colors on white paper. Glasses with colored filters in each eye separate the appropriate images by canceling the filter color out and rendering the complementary color black.

Anaglyph images are much easier to view than either parallel sighting or crossed eye stereograms, although the latter types offer bright and accurate color rendering, particularly in the red component, which is muted, or desaturated with even the best color anaglyphs. A compensating technique, commonly known as Anachrome, uses a slightly more transparent cyan filter in the patented glasses associated with the technique. Process reconfigures the typical anaglyph image to have less parallax.

An alternative to the usual red and cyan filter system of anaglyph is ColorCode 3-D, a patented anaglyph system which was invented in order to present an anaglyph image in conjunction with the NTSC television standard, in which the red channel is often compromised. ColorCode uses the complementary colors of yellow and dark blue on-screen, and the colors of the glasses' lenses are amber and dark blue.

The polarization 3D system has been the standard for theatrical presentations since it was used for Bwana Devil in 1952, though early IMAX presentations were done using the eclipse system and in the 1960s and 1970s classic 3D films were sometimes converted to anaglyph for special presentations. The polarization system has better color fidelity and less ghosting than the anaglyph system. In the post-'50s era, anaglyph has been used instead of polarization in feature presentations where only part of the film is in 3D such as in the 3D segment of Freddy's Dead: The Final Nightmare and the 3D segments of Spy Kids 3-D: Game Over.

Anaglyph is also used in printed materials and in 3D television broadcasts where polarization is not practical. 3D polarized televisions and other displays only became available from several manufacturers in 2008; these generate polarization on the receiving end.

==== Polarization systems ====
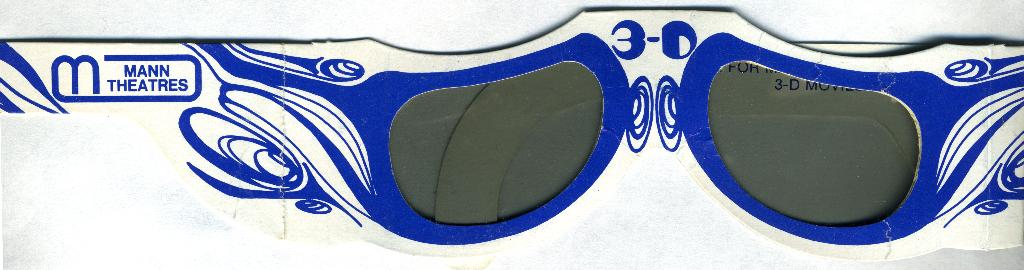
cardboard 3D linear polarized glasses from the 1980s similar to those used in the 1950s. Though some were plain white, they often had the name of the theatre and/or graphics from the film

To present a stereoscopic motion pictures, two images are projected superimposed onto the same screen through different polarizing filters. The viewer wears low-cost glasses which also contain a pair of polarizing filters oriented differently (clockwise/counterclockwise with circular polarization or at 90 degree angles, usually 45 and 135 degrees, with linear polarization). As each filter passes only that light which is similarly polarized and blocks the light polarized differently, each eye sees a different image. This is used to produce a three-dimensional effect by projecting the same scene into both eyes, but depicted from slightly different perspectives. Since no head tracking is involved, the entire audience can view the stereoscopic images at the same time.

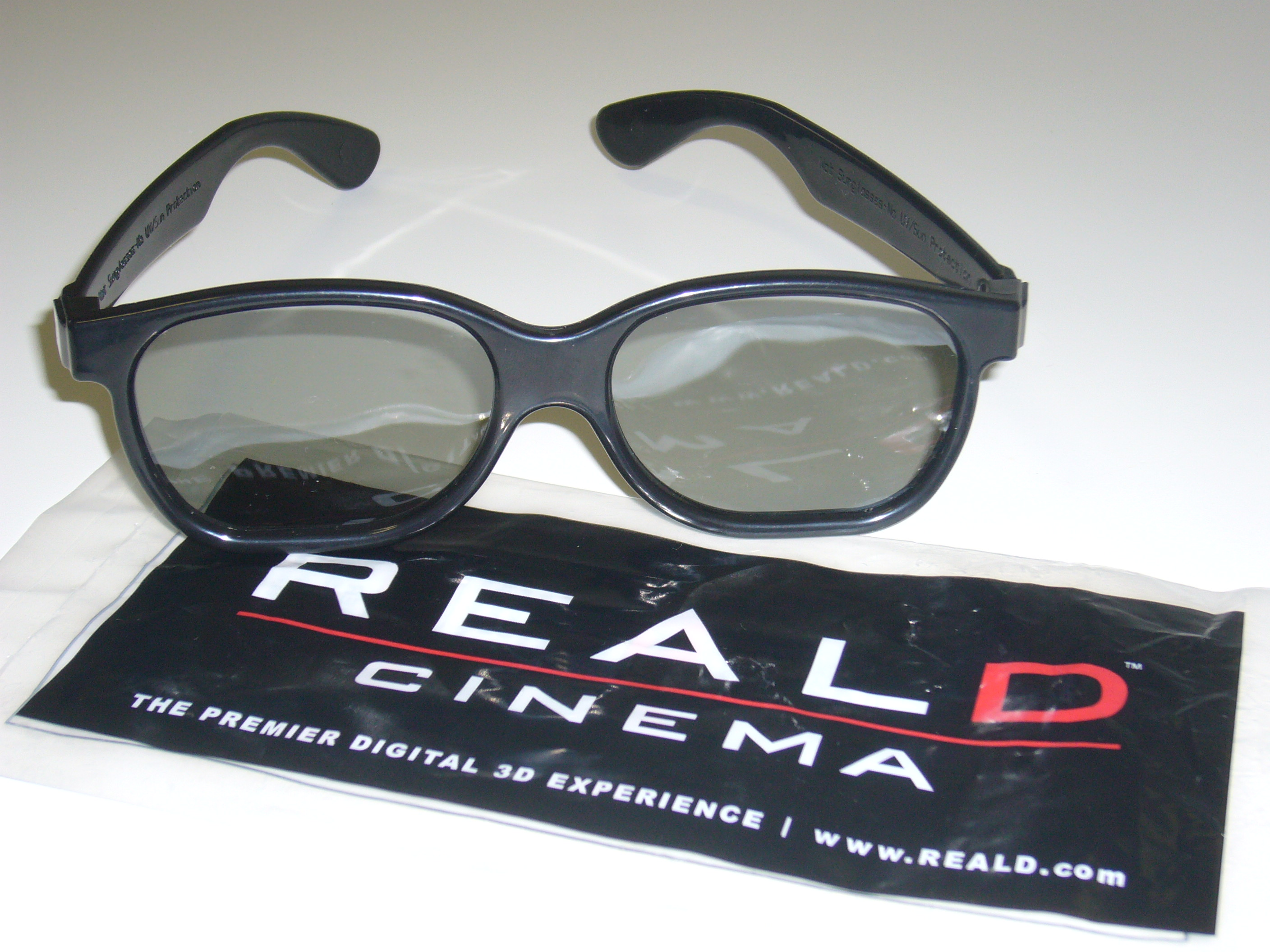
Resembling sunglasses, RealD circular polarized glasses are now the standard for theatrical releases and theme park attractions.

Circular polarization has an advantage over linear polarization, in that the viewer does not need to have their head upright and aligned with the screen for the polarization to work properly. With linear polarization, turning the glasses sideways causes the filters to go out of alignment with the screen filters causing the image to fade and for each eye to see the opposite frame more easily. For circular polarization, the polarizing effect works regardless of how the viewer's head is aligned with the screen such as tilted sideways, or even at a 90-degree angle (in which case lineraly-polarized glasses would have left and right image switched). The left eye will still only see the image intended for it, and vice versa, without fading or crosstalk. Nonetheless, 3D cinema films are made to be viewed without head tilt, and any significant head tilt will result in incorrect parallax and prevent binocular fusion.

In the case of RealD a circularly polarizing liquid crystal filter which can switch polarity 144 times per second is placed in front of the projector lens. Only one projector is needed, as the left and right eye images are displayed alternately. Sony features a new system called RealD XLS, which shows both circular polarized images simultaneously: A single 4K projector (4096×2160 resolution) displays both 2K images (2048×1080 resolution) on top of each other at the same time, a special lens attachment polarizes and projects the images.

Optical attachments can be added to traditional 35 mm projectors to adapt them for projecting film in the "over-and-under" format, in which each pair of images is stacked within one frame of film. The two images are projected through different polarizers and superimposed on the screen. This is a very cost-effective way to convert a theater for 3D as all that is needed are the attachments and a non-depolarizing screen surface, rather than a conversion to digital 3D projection. Thomson Technicolor currently produces an adapter of this type. A metallic screen is necessary for these systems as reflection from non-metallic surfaces destroys the polarization of the light.

Polarized stereoscopic pictures have been around since 1936, when Edwin H. Land first applied it to motion pictures. The so-called "3D movie craze" in the years 1952 through 1955 was almost entirely offered in theaters using linear polarizing projection and glasses. Only a minute amount of the total 3D films shown in the period used the anaglyph color filter method. Linear polarization was likewise used with consumer level stereo projectors. Polarization was also used during the 3D revival of the 1980s.

In the 2000s, computer animation, competition from DVDs and other media, digital projection, and the use of sophisticated IMAX 70 mm film projectors, have created an opportunity for a new wave of polarized 3D films.

All types of polarization will result in a darkening of the displayed image and poorer contrast compared to non-3D images. Light from lamps is normally emitted as a random collection of polarizations, while a polarization filter only passes a fraction of the light. As a result, the screen image is darker. This darkening can be compensated by increasing the brightness of the projector light source. If the initial polarization filter is inserted between the lamp and the image generation element, the light intensity striking the image element is not any higher than normal without the polarizing filter, and overall image contrast transmitted to the screen is not affected.

==== Active shutter ====
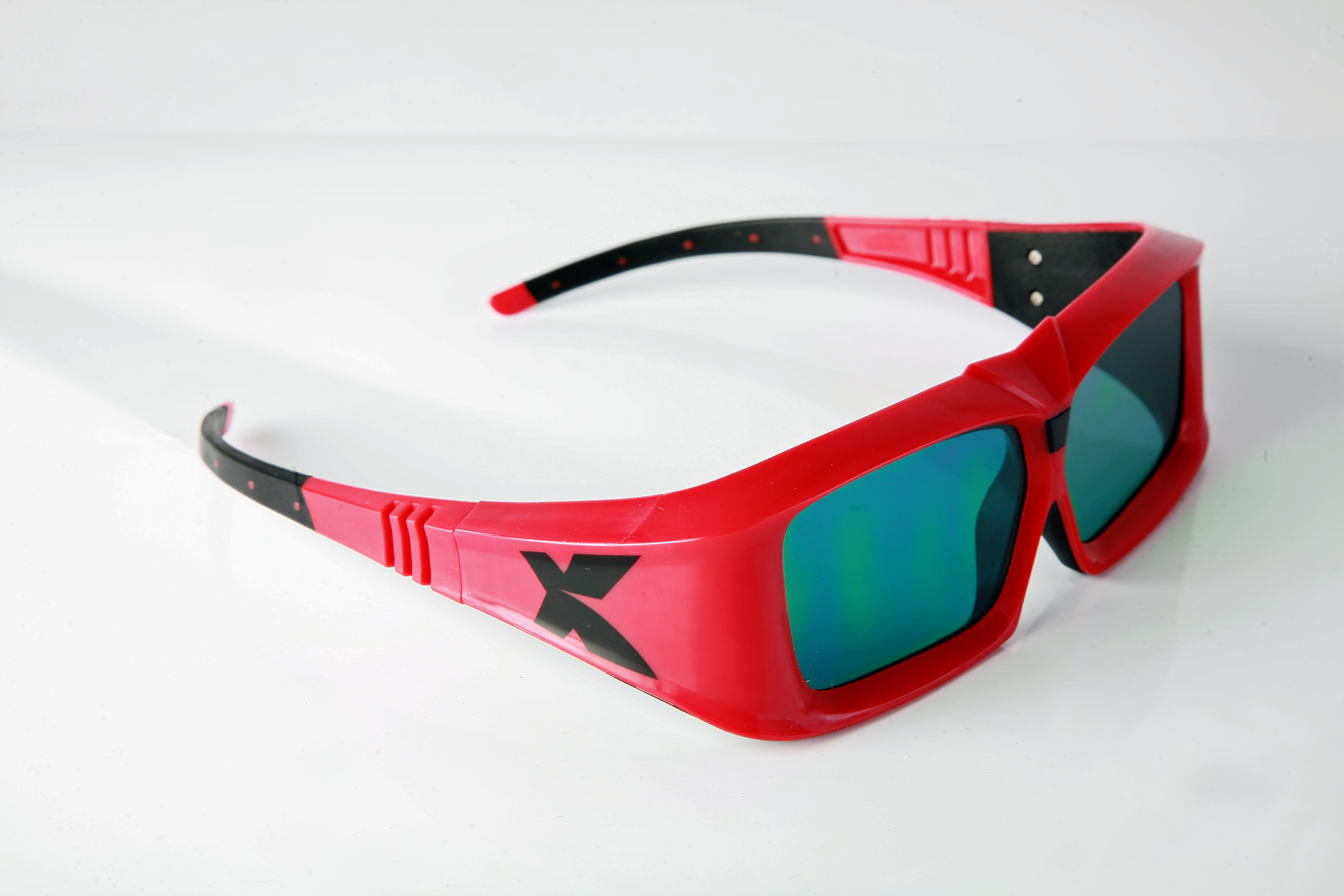
A pair of LCD shutter glasses used to view XpanD 3D films. The thick frames conceal the electronics and batteries.

In this technology, a mechanism is used to block light from each appropriate eye when the converse eye's image is projected on the screen.

The technology originated with the Eclipse Method, in which the projector alternates between left and right images, and opens and closes the shutters in the glasses or viewer in synchronization with the images on the screen. This was the basis of the Teleview system which was used briefly in 1922.

A newer implementation of the Eclipse Method came with liquid-crystal shutter glasses. Glasses containing liquid crystal that will let light through in synchronization with the images on the cinema, television or computer screen, using the concept of alternate-frame sequencing. This is the method used by nVidia, XpanD 3D, and earlier IMAX systems. A drawback of this method is the need for each person viewing to wear expensive, electronic glasses that must be synchronized with the display system using a wireless signal or attached wire. The shutter-glasses are heavier than most polarized glasses, though lighter models are no heavier than some sunglasses or deluxe polarized glasses. However these systems do not require a silver screen for projected images.

Liquid crystal light valves work by rotating light between two polarizing filters. Due to these internal polarizers, LCD shutter-glasses darken the display image of any LCD, plasma, or projector image source, which has the result that images appear dimmer and contrast is lower than for normal non-3D viewing. This is not necessarily a usage problem; for some types of displays which are already very bright with poor grayish black levels, LCD shutter glasses may actually improve the image quality.

==== Interference filter technology ====
Dolby 3D uses specific wavelengths of red, green, and blue for the right eye, and different wavelengths of red, green, and blue for the left eye. Glasses which filter out the very specific wavelengths allow the wearer to see a 3D image. This technology eliminates the expensive silver screens required for polarized systems such as RealD, which is the most common 3D display system in theaters. It does, however, require much more expensive glasses than the polarized systems. It is also known as spectral comb filtering or wavelength multiplex visualization

The recently introduced Omega 3D/Panavision 3D system also uses this technology, though with a wider spectrum and more "teeth" to the "comb" (5 for each eye in the Omega/Panavision system). The use of more spectral bands per eye eliminates the need to color process the image, required by the Dolby system. Evenly dividing the visible spectrum between the eyes gives the viewer a more relaxed "feel" as the light energy and color balance is nearly 50-50. Like the Dolby system, the Omega system can be used with white or silver screens. But it can be used with either film or digital projectors, unlike the Dolby filters that are only used on a digital system with a color correcting processor provided by Dolby. The Omega/Panavision system also claims that their glasses are cheaper to manufacture than those used by Dolby. In June 2012 the Omega 3D/Panavision 3D system was discontinued by DPVO Theatrical, who marketed it on behalf of Panavision, citing "challenging global economic and 3D market conditions". Although DPVO dissolved its business operations, Omega Optical continues promoting and selling 3D systems to non-theatrical markets. Omega Optical's 3D system contains projection filters and 3D glasses. In addition to the passive stereoscopic 3D system, Omega Optical has produced enhanced anaglyph 3D glasses. The Omega's red/cyan anaglyph glasses use complex metal oxide thin film coatings and high quality annealed glass optics.

==== Autostereoscopy ====
In this method, glasses are not required to see a 3D image. Lenticular lens and parallax barrier technologies involve imposing two (or more) images on the same sheet, in narrow, alternating strips, and using a screen that either blocks one of the two images' strips (in the case of parallax barriers) or uses equally narrow lenses to bend the strips of image and make it appear to fill the entire image (in the case of lenticular prints). To produce the 3D effect, the person must be positioned so that one eye sees one of the two images and the other sees the other.

Both images are projected onto a high-gain, corrugated screen that reflects light at acute angles. In order to see the stereoscopic image, the viewer must sit within a very narrow angle that is nearly perpendicular to the screen, limiting the size of the audience. Lenticular was used for theatrical presentation of numerous shorts in Russia from 1940 to 1948 and in 1946 for the feature-length film Robinson Crusoe.

Though lenticular's use in theatrical presentations has been rather limited, it has been widely used for a variety of novelty items and has even been used in amateur 3D photography. Recent use includes the Fujifilm FinePix Real 3D with an autostereoscopic display that was released in 2009. Other examples for this technology include autostereoscopic liquid crystal displays on monitors, notebooks, TVs, mobile phones and gaming devices, such as the Nintendo 3DS.

== Health effects ==
Some viewers have complained of headaches and eyestrain after watching 3D films. Motion sickness, in addition to other health concerns, are more easily induced by 3D presentations. One published study shows that of those who watch 3D films, nearly 55% experience varying levels of headaches, nausea and disorientation. Glasses designed to eliminate eyestrain by converting 3D images back into 2D have been developed.

There are two primary effects of 3D film that are unnatural for human vision: crosstalk between the eyes, caused by imperfect image separation, and the mismatch between convergence and accommodation, caused by the difference between an object's perceived position in front of, or behind the screen and the real origin of that light on the screen.

It is believed that approximately 12% of people are unable to properly see 3D images, due to a variety of medical conditions. According to another experiment up to 30% of people have very weak stereoscopic vision preventing them from depth perception based on stereo disparity. This nullifies or greatly decreases immersion effects of digital stereo to them.

The French National Research Agency (ANR) has sponsored multidisciplinary research in order to understand the effects of 3D film viewing, its grammar, and its acceptance.

== Criticism ==
After Toy Story, there were 10 really bad CG movies because everybody thought the success of that film was CG and not great characters that were beautifully designed and heartwarming. Now, you've got people quickly converting movies from 2D to 3D, which is not what we did. They're expecting the same result, when in fact they will probably work against the adoption of 3D because they'll be putting out an inferior product.

— Avatar director James Cameron

Most of the cues required to provide humans with relative depth information are already present in traditional 2D films. For example, closer objects occlude further ones, distant objects are desaturated and hazy relative to near ones, and the brain subconsciously "knows" the distance of many objects when the height is known (e.g. a human figure subtending only a small amount of the screen is more likely to be 2 m tall and far away than 10 cm tall and close). In fact, only two of these depth cues are not already present in 2D films: parallax, and the focus of the eyeball (accommodation).

3D film-making addresses accurate presentation of stereopsis from binocular disparity but not of accommodation, and therefore is insufficient in providing a complete 3D effect. However, promising results from research aimed at overcoming this shortcoming were presented at the 2010 Stereoscopic Displays and Applications conference in San Jose, U.S.

Film critic Mark Kermode argued that 3D adds "not that much" value to a film, and said that, while he liked Avatar, the many impressive things he saw in the film had nothing to do with 3D. Kermode has been an outspoken critic of 3D film describing the effect as a "nonsense" and recommends using two right or left lenses from the 3D glasses to cut out the "pointy, pointy 3D stereoscopic vision", although this technique still does not improve the huge brightness loss from a 3D film. Versions of these "2D glasses" are being marketed.

Director Christopher Nolan has criticised the notion that traditional film does not allow depth perception, saying "I think it's a misnomer to call it 3D versus 2D. The whole point of cinematic imagery is it's three dimensional... You know 95% of our depth cues come from occlusion, resolution, color and so forth, so the idea of calling a 2D movie a '2D movie' is a little misleading." Nolan also criticised that shooting on the required digital video does not offer a high enough quality image and that 3D cameras cannot be equipped with prime (non-zoom) lenses.

Late film critic Roger Ebert repeatedly criticized 3D film as being "too dim", sometimes distracting or even nausea-inducing, and argued that it is an expensive technology that adds nothing of value to the film-going experience (since 2D films already provide an illusion of 3D). While Ebert was "not opposed to 3-D as an option", he opposed it as a replacement for traditional film, and preferred 2-D technologies such as MaxiVision48 that improve image area/resolution and frames per second.

=== Brightness concerns ===
Most 3D systems will cut down the brightness of the picture considerably – the light loss can be as high as 88%. Some of this loss may be compensated by running the projector's bulb at higher power or using more powerful bulbs.

The 2D brightness cinema standard is 14 foot-lamberts (48 candela per square metre), as set by the SMPTE standard 196M. As of 2012, there is no official standard for 3D brightness. According to the industry de facto standard, however, the "acceptable brightness range" goes as low as 3.5 fL (12 cd/m^{2}) – just 25% of the standard 2D brightness.

Among others, Christopher Nolan has criticized the huge brightness loss: "You're not that aware of it because once you're 'in that world,' your eye compensates, but having struggled for years to get theaters up to the proper brightness, we're not sticking polarized filters in everything."

In September 2012, the DCI standards body issued a "recommended practice" calling for a 3D projection brightness of 7 fL (24 cd/m^{2}), with an acceptable range of 5–9 fL (17–31 cd/m^{2}). It is not known how many theaters actually achieve such light levels with current technology. Prototype laser projection systems have reached 14 fL (48 cd/m^{2}) for 3D on a cinema screen.

=== Post-conversion ===
Another major criticism is that many of the films in the 21st century to date were not filmed in 3D, but converted to 3D after filming. Filmmakers who have criticized the quality of this process include James Cameron (whose film Avatar was created mostly in 3D from the ground up, with some portions of the film created in 2D, and is largely credited with the revival of 3D) and Michael Bay. However, Cameron has said that quality 2D to 3D conversions can be done if they take the time they need and the director is involved. Cameron's Titanic was converted into 3D in 2012, taking 60 weeks and costing $18 million.

In contrast, computer-animated films for which the original computer models are still available can be rendered in 3D easily, as the depth information is still available and does not need to be inferred or approximated. This has been done with Toy Story, among others.

== See also ==
- Cinematography
- Digital cinema
- List of 3D films (1914–2004)
- List of 3D films (2005–present)
- 2D to 3D conversion
- Depth perception
- Stereoscopy
- Autostereoscopy
- 3D display
- 3D television
- 4D film
- Volumetric display
- 3-D Film Preservation Fund
- Motion capture
- Stereoscopic video game
- Surround sound
- Digital 3D
- Disney Digital 3-D
- RealD 3D
- Dolby 3D
- XpanD 3D
- MasterImage 3D
- IMAX 3D
- 4DX
