= Gorilla at Large =

1954 film by Harmon Jones

- Promotional one-sheet poster
- Directed by: Harmon Jones
- Written by: Leonard Praskins; Barney Slater
- Produced by: Robert L. Jacks (producer); Leonard Goldstein (executive producer)
- Starring: Cameron Mitchell; Anne Bancroft; Lee J. Cobb; Raymond Burr
- Cinematography: Lloyd Ahern
- Edited by: Paul Weatherwax
- Music by: Lionel Newman
- Production company: Panoramic Productions
- Distributed by: 20th Century Fox
- Release date: May 1954
- Running time: 83 minutes
- Country: United States
- Language: English
- Budget: $400,000

Gorilla at Large is a 1954 American horror mystery film made in 3D. The film stars Cameron Mitchell, Anne Bancroft, Lee J. Cobb and Raymond Burr, with Lee Marvin and Warren Stevens in supporting roles. Directed by Harmon Jones, it was made by Panoramic Productions, and distributed through 20th Century Fox in Technicolor and 3D.

It is notable for being one of the early movies distributed by 20th Century Fox to be filmed in 3D. (The first was Inferno, released a year before Gorilla at Large.)

== Plot ==
Cyrus Miller's carnival has come to town. Its chief draw is a gorilla named Goliath. Each night, Goliath is teased by a trapeze artist named Laverne. She swings back and forth, just out of reach from the simian's upraised arms. This frustrates Goliath, but audiences are thrilled. However, Cyrus, who is in a relationship with Laverne, thinks the act is getting old. So he promotes carnival barker Joey from pitchman to performer. Joey will don a gorilla costume and become Goliath's replacement. The difference is this time Laverne will fall from the trapeze and into the arms of a disguised Joey, who will make people believe she is performing with the actual gorilla. While explaining the new routine to Joey, Laverne acts seductively towards him. The idea seems promising to everyone but Kovacs, Goliath's trainer, who is about to become unemployed.

Joey has a fiancée named Audrey, and she is not happy either, fearing Joey will fall for Laverne. Joey takes the job nonetheless, as it would mean a higher pay, postponing his plans of leaving the carnival, marrying Audrey and studying law.

That evening, the carnival's crooked concessionaire, Morse, is found dead near Goliath's cage. His neck is broken, and the culprit was a human being. Joey becomes a suspect when it is learned he once threatened Morse for harassing Audrey. However, Joey believes Cyrus, who seems jealous of whomever Laverne lays her eyes on, is out to frame him.

Meanwhile, someone wearing Joey's costume releases Goliath from his cage. The animal ends up entering the carnival's Maze of Mirrors, where Audrey is turning off the lights. Upon hearing Audrey's screams, the carnival's crew rush to her aid. They find her safe, but another associate lies dead nearby. Despite the attempts to frame Joey, the police believe he is innocent, and as the investigation is close to finding the culprit, Cyrus voluntarily takes the blame for the crimes. He was being blackmailed by two of the victims for his role in the death of a carnival performer years before and seems to be jealous of Joey, so him being the murderer is plausible. Cyrus gets incarcerated, and the show goes on.

However, Joey later figures out that, due to an old injury he received while performing, Cyrus would never have been able to break the first victim's neck. He suspects the real culprit is Kovacs, as he used to be married to Laverne, the other person who was being blackmailed for the performer's death. As Laverne's act starts, Joey confronts Kovacs. However, Joey quickly notices signs that Laverne was the one using his costume and realizes she is the killer. Meanwhile, believing she is performing with a disguised Joey, Laverne lets herself fall into Goliath's arms. While she realizes her mistake, Goliath carries a screaming Laverne to the top of the carnival's roller coaster. Using fireworks, Joey and the police make the gorilla drop Laverne safely by its side before it dies in a hail of bullets. As Laverne is led away by police, Joey and Audrey resolve to quit the carnival.

== Cast ==
- Cameron Mitchell as Joey Matthews
- Anne Bancroft as Laverne Miller
- Lee J. Cobb as Detective Sergeant Garrison
- Raymond Burr as Cy Miller
- Charlotte Austin as Audrey Baxter
- Peter Whitney as Kovacs, the gorilla's keeper
- Lee Marvin as Shaughnessy the Cop
- Warren Stevens as Joe the Detective
- John Kellogg as Morse (as John G. Kellogg)
- Charles Tannen as Owens

For an independent production, Gorilla at Large was unusual because it featured both seasoned actors and upcoming stars.

Cameron Mitchell had appeared in the 1951 screen version of Arthur Miller's Death of a Salesman, then was signed as a contract star with 20th Century Fox. For Anne Bancroft, Gorilla was her fifth film under contract to Fox, and in 1962 her performance in The Miracle Worker won her an Academy Award. Lee J. Cobb had a prolific screen career and received two Oscar nominations, the first for On the Waterfront, made the same year as Gorilla at Large.

Raymond Burr's imposing stature and dark brooding looks often landed him the role of the villain before his breakout role of lawyer Perry Mason. The movie was released the same year he appeared as the chief antagonist in Alfred Hitchcock's Rear Window. Lee Marvin began his film career in Hollywood in the early 1950s, playing mainly crooks or cops, and later became a leading man.

George Barrows impersonated Goliath, one of many gorilla roles in his film and TV career. The most famous of these was as the alien Ro-Man in Robot Monster (1953), also a 3D production, in which he wore a gorilla suit with a diving helmet on his head.

== Production ==
Production for Gorilla at Large took place at Nu Pike Amusement Park in Long Beach, California. The crew had the use of the amusement park from midnight until morning for approximately a week.

Although released through 20th Century Fox, the film was made by Leonard Goldstein's Panoramic Productions. The idea behind the deal that was made between the two companies was that Fox would focus and release primarily CinemaScope films, and Panoramic would be its supplier of flat widescreen ratio films. The only other 3D productions released or produced by Fox were the previous year's Inferno, with Robert Ryan and Rhonda Fleming, and 1960's September Storm, with Joanne Dru and Mark Stevens. After the latter, Fox had never produced and released another 3D feature until both 2009 releases of Ice Age: Dawn of the Dinosaurs and James Cameron's Avatar.

Rather than make different posters for the 2D and 3D release of this movie, only a flat (non 3D) poster was made. Poster snipes with 3D were furnished to use on the posters for theatres showing the 3D version. This was common practice at the point that the film was released because fewer theaters were booking 3D films in their stereoscopic form.

== Reception ==
Bosley Crowther of The New York Times called Gorilla at Large a "straight scoop of melodramatic muck about murder and other odd distractions at an outdoor amusement park."

TV Guide wrote "This often hilarious 3-D thriller stars Bancroft as a trapeze artist at an amusement park, where the top attraction is a ferocious gorilla".

Cameron Mitchell recalled that he met Mel Brooks when both were dining at the Metro-Goldwyn-Mayer Commissary. Brooks (who married Anne Bancroft in 1964) told him that Gorilla at Large was his favorite film and asked him if he wanted to play a Jimmy Hoffa-type character in a movie for him that was the 1982 comedy My Favorite Year.

== Releases ==
- A dual projection polarized 3D print of Gorilla at Large was screened at both The World 3-D Expos, most recently at the Second World 3-D Expo on September 17, 2006, at the American Cinematheque's Egyptian Theatre in Hollywood and at the 3-D at the Castro film festival October 17, 2006 at the Castro Theatre in San Francisco.
- Gorilla at Large was released on DVD on September 11, 2007.
