= Fairall =

Fairall may refer to:

- Anthony Patrick Fairall (1943–2008), South African astronomer
- Harry K. Fairall (1882–1958), American camera technician and inventor
- Nicholas Fairall (born 1989), American skier
- Percy Fairall (1909–1980), Australian rugby league footballer
- William Fairall (died 1749), English outlaw

== See also ==
- Fairall's honey-suckle (Lambertia fairallii)
