= 3-D Film Preservation Fund =

American nonprofit organization

The 3-D Film Preservation Fund (or 3DFPF) is a 501(c)(3) nonprofit corporation, dedicated to the preservation of stereoscopic motion pictures. It was formed in 2006 by Jeff Joseph of Sabucat Productions, Robert Furmanek (brother of Ron, and Daniel Symmes of Dimension-3.

In September 2006, the 3DFPF hosted the second World 3-D Exposition in Hollywood, California as part of a ten-day festival of 3-D movies, held at Grauman's Egyptian Theatre.

Along with the favorites of the previous exposition were newly discovered features and shorts, and like the previous Expo, guests from each film. Expo II was announced as being the local for the world premiere of several films never before seen in 3-D, including The Diamond Wizard and the Universal short subject, Hawaiian Nights with Mamie Van Doren and Pinky Lee. Other "re-premieres" of films not seen since their original release in stereoscopic form included Cease Fire!, Wings of the Hawk, Those Redheads From Seattle, and Taza, Son of Cochise. Also shown were the long-lost shorts Carmenesque and A Day in the Country (both 1953) and Kelley's Plasticon Pictures (1922), the earliest surviving 3-D film. All new films were restored by the 3DFPF. Except for a few short films presented in anaglyph form in the early months of 1953 (not widely seen), all of the features, shorts, and cartoons exhibited in commercial theaters from 1952 through 1955 were projected using polarized light.

== List of restored films (chronological) ==
The following list of films are restored thanks to the 3-D Film Preservation Fund:

- Kelley's Plasticon Pictures (short, 1922)
- New Dimensions (a.k.a. Motor Rhythm) (short, 1940)
- Thrills For You (short, 1940)
- A Day in the Country (short, 1953)
- Carmenesque (short, 1953)
- Sangaree (1953)
- Stardust in Your Eyes (short, 1953)
- Wings of the Hawk (1953)
- Those Redheads From Seattle (1953)
- Carnival in April (short, 1953)
- Hawaiian Nights (short, 1953)
- Cease Fire! (1953)
- Boo Moon (short, 1953)
- The Diamond (a.k.a. The Diamond Wizard) (1954)
- The Adventures of Sam Space (short, 1954)

== See also ==
- 3D film
- List of 3D films
