= Walter Doniger =

American film director (1917–2011)

- Born: Walter J. Doniger; July 1, 1917; New York, New York
- Died: November 24, 2011 (aged 94)
- Occupations: screenwriter, film director, television director, film producer
- Spouse: Elaine Osterman
- Children: 1

Walter J. Doniger (July 1, 1917 – November 24, 2011) was an American film and television director. A graduate of the Harvard School of Business, early in his career he was a screenwriter.

== Career ==
In the early 1940s, Doniger started as a scriptwriter with Universal Films. During World War II, he worked on training films for the United States Army. His knowledge of military matters was reflected in some of his later work for television and films.

After the war, Doniger worked as a screenwriter, director and producer. He wrote some of the scripts for the NBC-TV series Your Show Time (1949). He specialized in hard-boiled action pictures, including prison dramas (Duffy of San Quentin, 1954, and The Steel Cage, 1954), as well as war pictures (Cease Fire!, 1953). The latter was one of the first 3-D war films.

He directed sports films, including Safe at Home! (1962, starring New York Yankee greats Mickey Mantle and Roger Maris), and the made-for-TV movie Mad Bull (1977).

In 1957, Doniger established a production company, Bettina Productions Ltd. By this time he had gravitated towards working primarily for episodic television, particularly as director of western series, such as Cheyenne (1956–57); Tombstone Territory (1957–58), Maverick, (1957), and Bat Masterson (1958–60). He also directed episodes of Highway Patrol, Men Into Space, Dick Powell Theatre, Mr. Novak, Bracken's World, Rod Serling's Night Gallery, and Owen Marshall: Counselor at Law, among others.

During the 1960s, Doniger directed 64 episodes of the popular soap opera Peyton Place. After leaving Peyton Place, Doniger worked at Universal and eventually returned to action subjects, where he was most at home. He directed several episodes of the popular crime series McCloud.

His abrasive style occasionally brought him into conflict with producers and stars.

== Later life ==
In 2008, Doniger donated some of his television scripts and records to the Cinematic Arts Library of the University of Southern California.

== Personal life ==
Doniger was born in New York, New York, in 1917. He married Elaine Osterman, a magazine editor, on June 13, 1941. They had a son. He died in Los Angeles, California, in 2011.

== Filmography ==
- Cease Fire! (1953)
