= Speed Crazy =

1959 American film

- Theatrical release poster
- Directed by: William J. Hole Jr.
- Written by: Richard Bernstein; George Waters
- Produced by: Richard Bernstein
- Starring: Brett Halsey; Yvonne Lime; Charles Willcox; Trustin Howard; Jacqueline Ravell; Baynes Barron
- Cinematography: Ernest Haller
- Edited by: Irving Berlin
- Music by: Richard LaSalle
- Production company: Viscount
- Distributed by: Allied Artists Pictures
- Release date: June 28, 1959
- Running time: 75 minutes
- Country: United States
- Language: English

Speed Crazy is a 1959 American crime film directed by William J. Hole Jr. and written by Richard Bernstein and George Waters. The film stars Brett Halsey, Yvonne Lime, Charles Willcox, Trustin Howard, Jacqueline Ravell and Baynes Barron. The film was released on June 28, 1959, by Allied Artists Pictures.

== Plot ==
Nick Burrow competes and races to the point of being trapped in an actual race.

== Cast ==
- Brett Halsey as Nick Barrow
- Yvonne Lime as Peggy Hendrix
- Charles Willcox as Hap Farley
- Trustin Howard as Smiley
- Jacqueline Ravell as Gina Lombardi
- Baynes Barron as Ace Benton
- Regina Gleason as Linda Farley
- Byron Keith as Jim Brand
- Charlotte Fletcher as Dee
- Jackie Joseph as Laura
- Vic Marlo as Charlie Dale
- Robert Swan as Tommy
- Mark Sheeler as Tolliver
- Troy Patterson as Leather Jacket No. 1
- Robert Hinkle as Sheriff
