= Robot Monster =

1953 American science-fiction movie

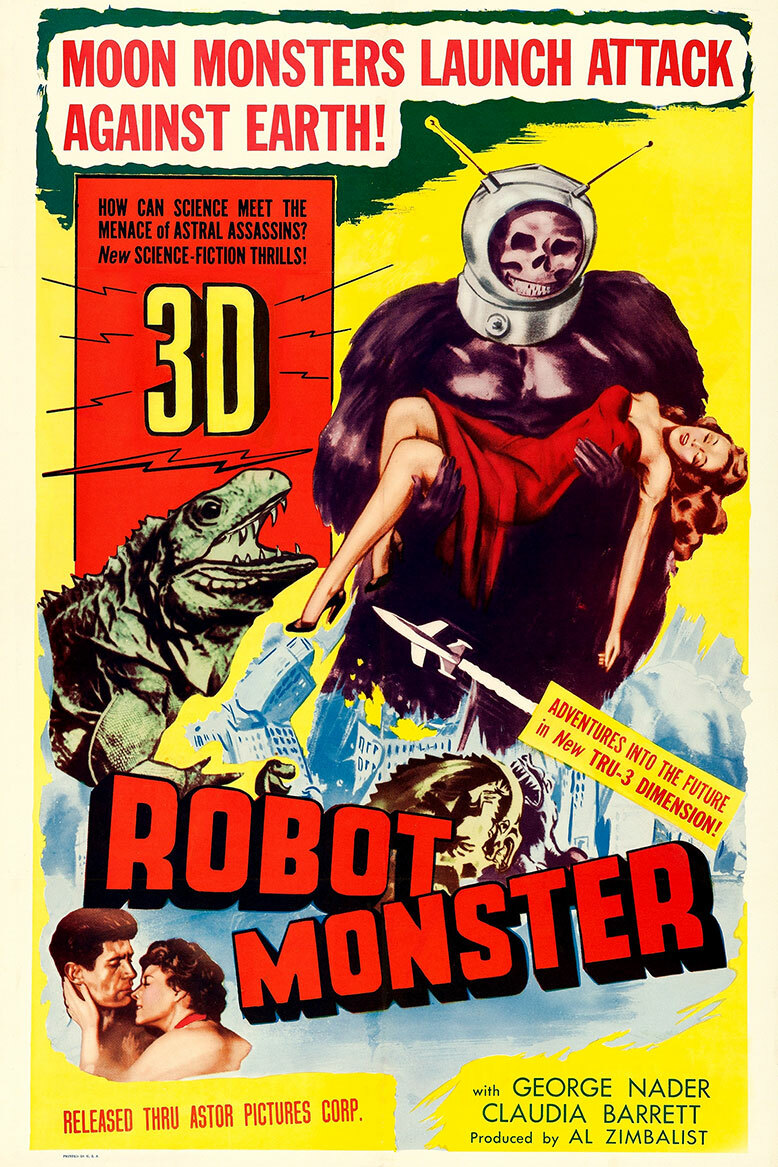
- Theatrical release poster
- Directed by: Phil Tucker
- Written by: Wyott Ordung
- Produced by: Phil Tucker; Al Zimbalist
- Starring: George Nader; Claudia Barrett; George Barrows
- Cinematography: Jack Greenhalgh
- Edited by: Bruce Schoengarth; Merrill White
- Music by: Elmer Bernstein
- Production companies: Three Dimension Pictures, Inc.
- Distributed by: Astor Pictures
- Release date: June 24, 1953
- Running time: 66 minutes
- Country: United States
- Language: English
- Budget: $16,000
- Box office: $1 million

Trailer for Robot Monster

Robot Monster (also released as Monster from Mars) is a 1953 American independent 3D science-fiction horror film produced and directed by Phil Tucker, and starring George Nader, Claudia Barrett, and George Barrows. The film follows an alien robot who, while on a mission to destroy Earth and humanity, betrays the orders of his master, the Great Guidance, by protecting a woman he was tasked to murder.

The film's production lasted only four days and took only $16,000 to produce. Production subsequently wrapped on March 23, 1953. Due to the constraints of the film's minuscule budget, Tucker opted to hire Barrows who had made his own gorilla suit, along with other adjustments. It was shot in only a handful of locations including Bronson Canyon. The finished film was also printed in a dual strip, polarized 3D, which many critics found to be very high quality, and also added an additional $4,000 to the budget. While containing extensive stock footage found in other productions, Robot Monster notably also bore plot similarities to Invaders From Mars (1953), a film that was distributed by 20th Century Fox a month earlier.

The film was distributed in the United States by Astor Pictures on June 24, 1953. The film received mixed reviews from contemporary critics, and was a box-office success, grossing $1 million. However in later decades, Robot Monster is often remembered as one of the worst films of all time, with its plot and production values receiving criticism.

In December of that year following the film's release, Tucker attempted suicide due to his lack of compensation for his work on the film. Tucker survived following detectives responding to his suicide note which he had posted in a newspaper prior. The reason why Tucker was not compensated remains unclear.

== Plot ==
Ro-Man Extension XJ-2, referred to as just Ro-Man (a creature with an ape-like body and an antenna-equipped helmet covering its head and emitting electric flashes), has destroyed all human life on Earth with a Calcinator death ray to prevent Humanity from challenging his race, except for eight humans who remain alive in a protected facility. The survivors are a professor, whose name is never mentioned; his wife; their two daughters, Alice and Carla; their young son, Johnny; the professor's assistant, Roy; and space pilots Jason and McCloud (neither of whom is seen or heard). Both pilots depart in a rocket ship for an orbiting space platform. All eight have developed an immunity to Ro-Man's death ray, having received an experimental antibiotic serum developed by the professor intended to cure all diseases.

Ro-Man must complete the destruction of all humans, even if it means his physically killing them one by one, before his mission to subjugate the Earth is complete. After fruitless negotiations, Ro-Man destroys Jason and McCloud's spaceship that had been sent into space to escape, along with the space platform. The Professor uses the machine intended to contact Jason and McCloud to instead contact Ro-Man, pleading for him to let them go as they pose no threat to him. Ro-Man instead demands to talk to Alice alone, who agrees despite her family's protests. When Johnny leaves to find Ro-Man, Alice ventures out with Roy to find him. Johnny confronts Ro-Man and reveals his immunity to the death ray, causing Ro-Man to begin planning a method to counteract this immunity.

Alice and Roy find Johnny, and after inexplicably kissing each other while still in danger, return to the facility. Alice and Roy announce to the professor their desire to marry. The Professor then declares it the biggest event of the year. Ro-Man contacts Great Guidance (referred to as "The Great One"), leader of the Ro-Man Empire, to announce his plan, and is told that he must complete this goal before the Earth finishes revolving. The marriage is conducted, with the Professor asking the Lord for a victory in Mankind's struggle. Ro-Man discovers Carla outside the facility and strangles her.

Ro-Man's mission is waylaid, however, when he develops an illogical attraction to Alice and cannot bring himself to eliminate her, asking the Great One if he may keep one human, but the Great One demands that he continue the mission. Ro-Man rediscovers Alice and Roy, and throws Roy off a cliff. He explains to Alice that the source of his energy lies in his cave, where he takes her and attempts to woo her before being interrupted by the Professor's broadcast. They ask for a quick death at the ravine, and Ro-Man agrees. Immediately after this, the Great One contacts him, angry at him for thinking up the plan to keep the girl and accusing him of bearing free will in violation of Ro-Man law. He gives Ro-Man one last chance to destroy the girl, which Ro-Man refuses to. Johnny distracts him, allowing the family to save Alice. Both Johnny and Ro-Man are suddenly killed by the Great One with a Calcinator blast. The Great One continues the genocide with Cosmic Q-Rays, which cause prehistoric reptiles to appear; and psychotronic vibrations, which "smash the planet Earth out of the universe".

But Johnny is alive, having just awakened from a concussion-induced fever dream. Up to now, all that has happened has just been his nightmare. His sisters, their mother, and the two scientists, whom the family met while picnicking in Bronson Canyon, rejoice at finding him. Johnny and his family invite the scientists home for dinner; they accept.

Suddenly, the Great One, his arms raised in a threatening manner, walks out of his cave directly toward the audience.

== Cast ==
- George Nader as Roy
- Claudia Barrett as Alice
- Selena Royle as mother
- John Mylong as The Professor
- Gregory Moffett as Johnny
- Pamela Paulson as Carla
- George Barrows as Ro-Man / Great Guidance
  - John Brown as Ro-Man / Great Guidance (voices)

== Production ==
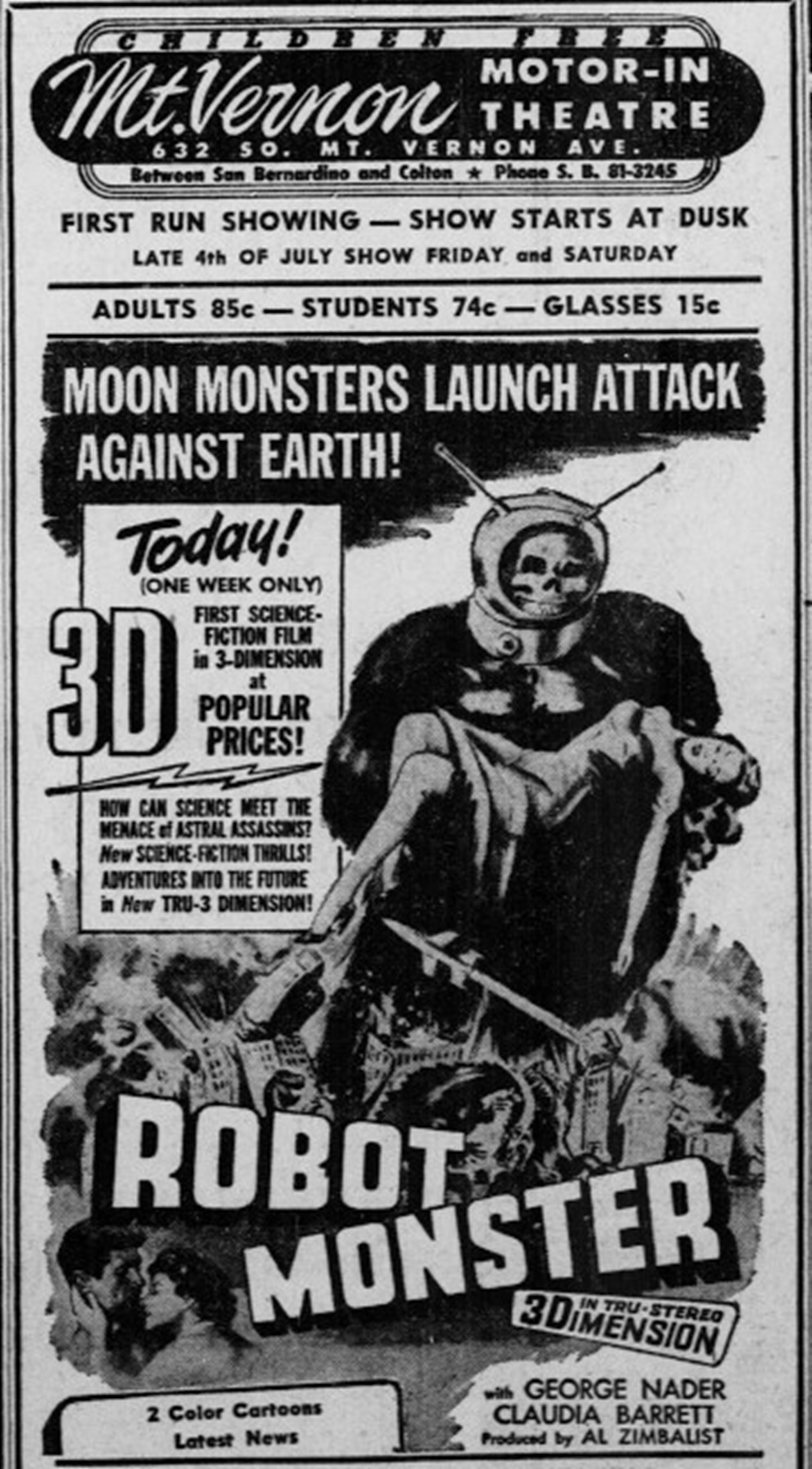
Drive-in advertisement from 1953

25-year-old writer/director Tucker made Robot Monster in four days for an estimated $16,000 (equivalent to $190,000 in 2025), although film journals from the time reported that it cost $50,000. Except for a few scenes at a house in Los Angeles and a building site near Dodger Stadium, most footage was filmed outdoors in Bronson Canyon, the site of innumerable motion pictures and TV settings. It also included stock footage from Flight to Mars (1951) and One Million B.C. (1940). Its working titles were Monsters from the Moon and Monster from Mars. Principal photography on Robot Monster wrapped on March 23, 1953.

Robot Monster's very low budget did not allow for a robot costume as first intended, so Tucker hired his friend George Barrows, who had made his own gorilla suit, to play Ro-Man; Tucker then added a space helmet similar to those used in Republic serials such as Radar Men from the Moon.

Robot Monster is similar in its plot to Invaders from Mars, released a month earlier by 20th Century Fox. Both films contain a young boy, stumbling upon an alien invasion, who is captured as he struggles to save his family and himself. As the alien commences the final destruction of Earth, the boy awakens to find it was all a dream. Barrett recalled in an interview that the film's original screenplay was designed as reality, but director Tucker changed his mind and then shot a new twist ending that showed the film's story has been a boy's dream that is about to come true.

In Robot Monster's opening credits, "N. A. Fischer Chemical Products" is given prominent credit for the "Billion Bubble Machine", used as part of Ro-Man's communication device for reporting to his superior, the Great Guidance.

The film was preceded in theatres by Stardust in Your Eyes, a one-reel 3D monologue by comic/impressionist Trustin Howard, performing under his stage name "Slick Slavin."

=== Casting ===
While George Barrows physically portrayed Ro-Man, the character's voice was dubbed by veteran radio actor John Brown.

The leading man role was played by George Nader, a 20th Century Fox and RKO Pictures contract player who had mainly played minor roles. Robot Monster was his first leading role, and two years after its release he would win a Golden Globe Award for New Star of the Year – Actor for the film Four Guns to the Border. He thereafter signed with Universal Studios, where he starred mostly in secondary features.

Selena Royle was a longtime MGM stock player, who had a durable film career beginning in 1941, but it ended in 1951 when she was branded a Communist sympathizer. She refused to appear before the House Committee on Un-American Activities and eventually cleared her name. By then, the damage to her reputation had already been done; she made only two additional films, Robot Monster being her second-to-last.

Claudia Barrett accepted the part of Alice against the advice of her agent. She said the following about her role:

When you decide to make a movie, the decision is made for various reasons: money, fame, or working with a particular star or director. I just wanted to act. I was a professional actress for 14 years, and I really loved the business. And Robot Monster was a movie I enjoyed making.

=== 3D ===
Robot Monster was shot and projected in dual-strip, polarized 3D. The stereoscopic photography in the film is considered by many critics to be high quality, especially for a film whose crew had little experience with the newly developed camera rig. Producer Al Zimbalist later told The New York Times that shooting the film in 3D (which involved using another camera) added an extra $4,510.54 to the budget.

=== Special effects ===
Robot Monster's special effects include stock footage from One Million B.C. (1940), Lost Continent (1951), and Flight to Mars (1951); a brief appearance of the Rocketship X-M (1950) spaceship boarding; and a matte painting of the ruins of New York City from Captive Women (1952).

=== Film score ===
Robot Monster's music score was composed by Elmer Bernstein, who also composed Cat Women of the Moon for producer Al Zimbalist the same year Bernstein recalled he was stuck in a period where he was "greylisted" because of his left-wing politics and only offered minor films, but said he enjoyed the challenge of trying to help such a low-budget film. Wyott Ordung stated that Bernstein scored the film with an eight-piece orchestra, and Capitol Records expressed interest in producing an album.

One critic told how he had watched the film as a teenager when it was first shown on television in 1954 and said it was "one of Elmer Bernstein's best very early scores."

== Release ==
Robot Monster was released by Astor Pictures on June 24, 1953, at a runtime of 62 minutes. It was originally released with the Three Dimension Pictures short Stardust in Your Eyes, starring nightclub comedian Trustin Howard as Slick Slavin. It grossed $1,000,000 (equivalent to $12,000,000 in 2025) during its initial theatrical release, more than 60 times its original investment.

== Reception ==
=== Contemporary ===
The December 1952 review in Variety noted, "Judged on the basis of novelty, as a showcase for the Tru-Stereo Process, Robot Monster comes off surprisingly well, considering the extremely limited budget ($50,000) and schedule on which the film was shot".

In June 1953, the Los Angeles Times called it "a crazy mixed up movie ... even children may be a little bored by it all" and Harrison's Reports, the following month, called it "the poorest 3-D picture that [has] been made so far." Adding, "the story is completely illogical, and the supposed monsters from another planet are laughable. Even the acting, at times, is ridiculous".

In December 1953, the Los Angeles Times reported that "theater men" considered the film "one of the top turkeys of the year."

=== Legacy ===
The film holds a 36% approval rating at the film review aggregator website Rotten Tomatoes, based on 14 reviews, with an average rating of 4.15/10.

The film is frequently considered one of the worst movies ever made, with film historian Leonard Maltin writing in his 2009 Movie Guide, "[Robot Monster is] one of the genuine legends of Hollywood – embarrassingly, hilariously awful [...] just dig that bubble-machine with the TV antenna."

== Aftermath ==
In December 1953, it was reported that Tucker tried to commit suicide at the Hollywood Knickerbocker Hotel. He was saved only because he had written a suicide letter and sent it to a newspaper, which sent a reporter and some detectives to the hotel. He was discovered with a pass in his pocket from the psychopathic ward of a veteran's hospital. In the letter, Tucker said he had not been paid for Robot Monster and was unable to get a job. "When I was refused a job – even as an usher", Tucker wrote, "I finally realized my future in the film industry was bleak." It was revealed that Tucker and the producer had quarreled, and film exhibitors had instructions not to let Tucker in to see the film unless he paid admission.

In Keep Watching the Skies!, a comprehensive history of 1950s and early 1960s American science-fiction films, author Bill Warren claimed that Tucker's attempted suicide was due to depression and a dispute with the film's distributor, who had allegedly refused to pay Tucker his contracted percentage of the film's profits.

In his autobiographical book Hollywood Rat Race, Ed Wood refers derisively to Tucker, claiming his suicide attempt was actually a publicity stunt to draw attention to failing film projects, and that he made multiple such attempts over the years.

== In popular culture ==
- the 1984 music video You Might Think features a scene in a movie theater watching Robot Monster, with lead singer Ric Ocasek transforming into the monster.
- Ro-Man is seen in the 2003 film Looney Tunes: Back in Action.
- In the 2010 animated film Megamind, the character Minion (voiced by David Cross) resembles Ro-Man, with the body of a gorilla and a transparent head with a fish in it.
- SCP-2006, a shape-shifting creature from the SCP Foundation, takes the form of Ro-Man as a means of scaring its SCP caretakers, but is limited in its exposure and knowledge of more frightening films as its powers could spell universal disaster.
- Stephen King writes in his memoir On Writing: A Memoir of the Craft that Robot Monster was the first thing he ever saw on television.

=== Mystery Science Theater 3000 ===
Robot Monster was featured in episode #107 of Mystery Science Theater 3000 (MST3K), which premiered on the Comedy Channel on December 23, 1989. The episode also included two Commando Cody shorts, episodes 4 and 5 from Radar Men from the Moon. MST3K's Kevin Murphy complains about many things in the movie but especially the treatment of the lead female character, "a brilliant scientist [who] turns into a blubbering imbecile at the sight of her boyfriend ... The woman constantly gets carried around by her father, her boyfriend, and ultimately Ro-Man."

Like most of Mystery Science Theater 3000's first-season episodes, Robot Monster has a poor reputation. In Paste, writer Jim Vorel placed the movie #183 (Note: Ranking based on 197 episodes as of 2018.) in his ranking of episodes from the series first twelve seasons. Despite the movie's reputation, Vorel calls Robot Monster "pretty harmless fun all on its own," even if the monster was created "as a combination of laziness and budget." Vorel contends the worst parts of the episode are the two Commando Cody shorts that precede the film and the lower-density and lower-sophistication jokes made about the movie. Writer Chris Morgan, however, listed Robot Monster as one of the ten worst movies shown on MST3K and ranked Ro-Man as the second-worst monster in movies featured on MST3K; still, despite Ro-Man's design—"He’s a robot, but he looks like a gorilla ... [with] an old-school diving helmet with antennae attached to it"—Morgan calls him "one of the most iconic bad movie monsters" and "the only fun thing in an otherwise incredibly boring movie."

The MST3K version of the film was included as part of the Mystery Science Theater 3000, Volume XIX DVD collection, released by Shout! Factory on November 9, 2010. Special features with the film include an interview with filmmaker Larry Blamire about Robot Monster, "Larry Blamire Geeks Out," and the movie's theatrical trailer. The other episodes in the four-disc set include Bride of the Monster (#423), Devil Doll (#818), and Devil Fish (#911).

== See also ==
- List of 3D films pre-2005
- List of cult films
- List of 20th century films considered the worst

== Bibliography ==
- Hayes, R. M. 3-D Movies: "A History and Filmography of Stereoscopic Cinema. Jefferson, North Carolina: McFarland Classics, 1998. ISBN 978-0-78640-578-7.
- Mitchell, Charles P. A Guide to Apocalyptic Cinema. Portsmouth, New Hampshire: Greenwood Publishing Group, 2001. ISBN 978-0-31331-527-5.
- Parla, Paul and Charles P. Mitchell. "Claudia Barrett interview". Screen Sirens Scream!: Interviews with 20 Actresses from Science Fiction, Horror, Film Noir and Mystery Movies, 1930s to 1960s. Jefferson, North Carolina: McFarland & Company, 2009. ISBN 978-0-7864-4587-5.
- Rux, Bruce. Hollywood Vs. the Aliens: The Motion Picture Industry's Participation in UFO Disinformation. Berkeley, California: North Atlantic Books/Frog, Ltd., 1997. ISBN 978-1-88331-961-8.
- Spencer, Kristopher. Film And Television Scores, 1950-1979: A Critical Survey by Genre. Jefferson, North Carolina: McFarland & Company, 2008. ISBN 978-0-78643-682-8.
- Strick, Philip. Science Fiction Movies. London: Octopus Books Limited, 1976. ISBN 978-0-70640-470-8.
- Warren, Bill. Keep Watching The Skies, American Science Fiction Movies of the Fifties, Vol I: 1950–1957. Jefferson, North Carolina: McFarland & Company, 1982. ISBN 978-0-89950-032-4.
- Zone, Ray. 3-D Revolution: The History of Modern Stereoscopic Cinema. Lexington, Kentucky: University Press of Kentucky, 2012. ISBN 978-0-8131-3611-0.
