= The Power of Love (film) =

1922 film

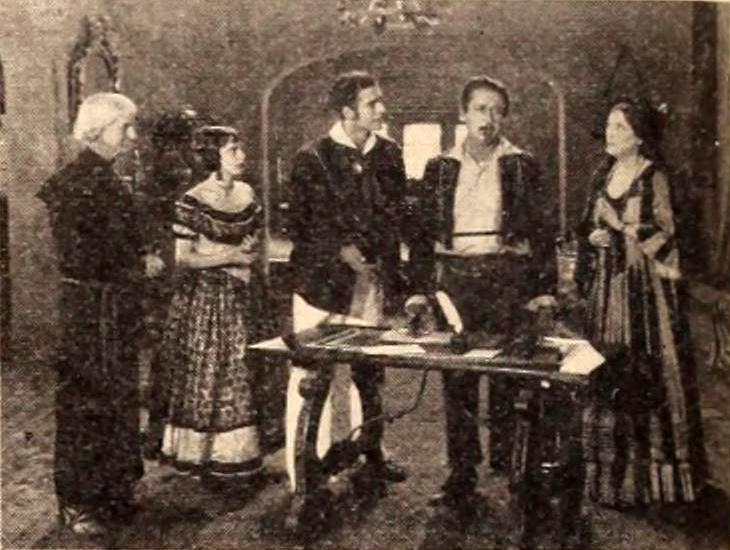
- Still from film published in Exhibitor's Herald
- Directed by: Nat G. Deverich; Harry K. Fairall
- Produced by: Harry K. Fairall
- Starring: Elliot Sparling; Barbara Bedford; Noah Beery
- Production company: Haworth Film Company
- Distributed by: Perfect Pictures
- Release date: September 27, 1922
- Running time: 5 reels
- Country: United States
- Language: Silent (English intertitles)

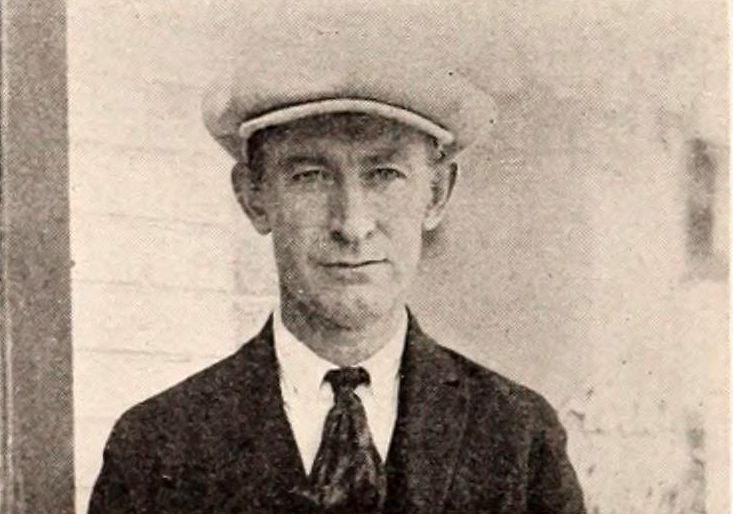
Harry K. Fairall

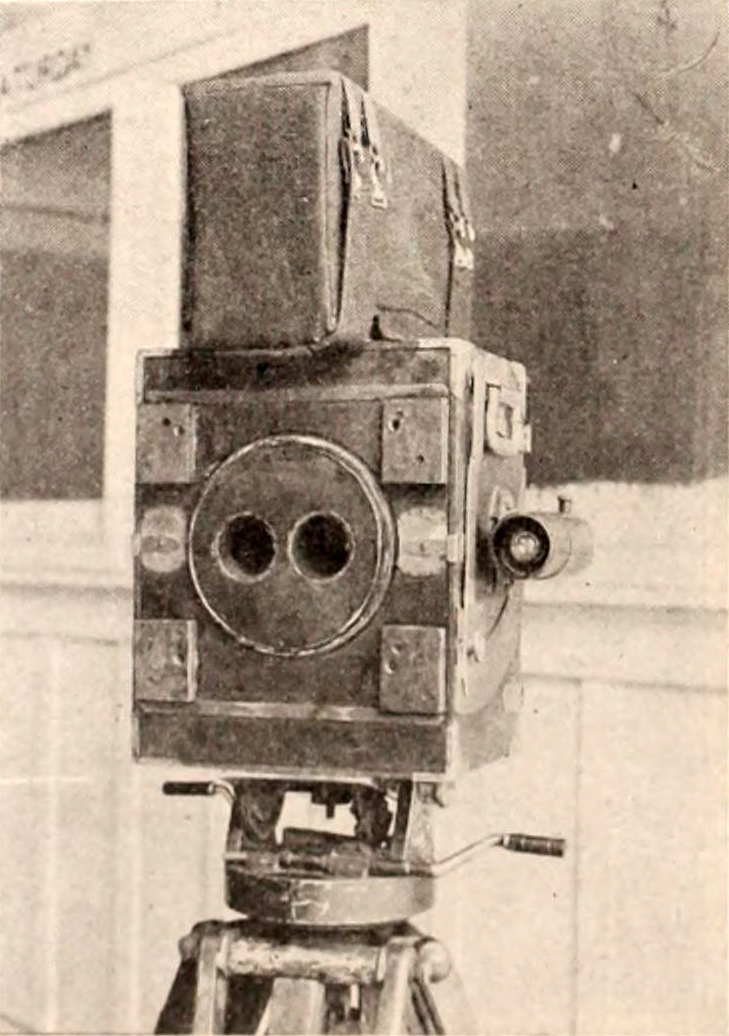
3D camera

The Power of Love is an American silent drama film and the first 3D feature film worldwide. The premiere was on September 27, 1922, at the Ambassador Hotel Theater in Los Angeles.

The 3D version of the film is presumed lost. The film was later shown in 2D as Forbidden Lover. This 2D version is also believed lost.

== Plot ==
Don Almeda promises his daughter Maria to Don Alvarez because of his financial trouble. Maria does not love Don Alvarez and falls in love with Terry O'Neal. He is a stranger who has been wounded by robbers associated with Alvarez and later he takes Alvarez's place at a masquerade ball. Alvarez robs an old padre of some pearls and stabs him with O'Neal's knife and accuses O'Neal of the murder. Alvarez tries to shoot him, but wounds Maria instead, because she has thrown herself in front of him. Maria recovers and after proving that Alvarez is a thief and a killer, marries O'Neal.

== Cast ==
- Elliot Sparling as Terry O'Neal
- Barbara Bedford as Maria Almeda
- Noah Beery as Don Almeda
- Aileen Manning as Ysabel Almeda
- Albert Prisco as Don Alvarez
- John Herdman as The Old Padre

== Background ==
The film utilized the red-and-green anaglyph system for the 3D experience and also gave the audience the option of viewing one of two different endings to the film (in 2D) by looking through only the red or green lens of the spectacles, depending on whether the viewer wanted to see a happy or tragic ending. The Power of Love is the only film released in the two-camera, two-projector Fairall-Elder stereoscopic format developed by Harry K. Fairall and Robert F. Elder.

== Reception ==
The film was not a success in 3D and was only screened one time again in this version for exhibitors and press in New York City. The film received a decent review in Moving Picture World. Despite other rave reviews, it was not booked again by other exhibitors in this format.

In July 1923, the film was acquired by the new Selznick Distributing Corporation and widely distributed in 2D as Forbidden Lover in 1923–24.
