= George Barrows =

American actor (1914–1994)

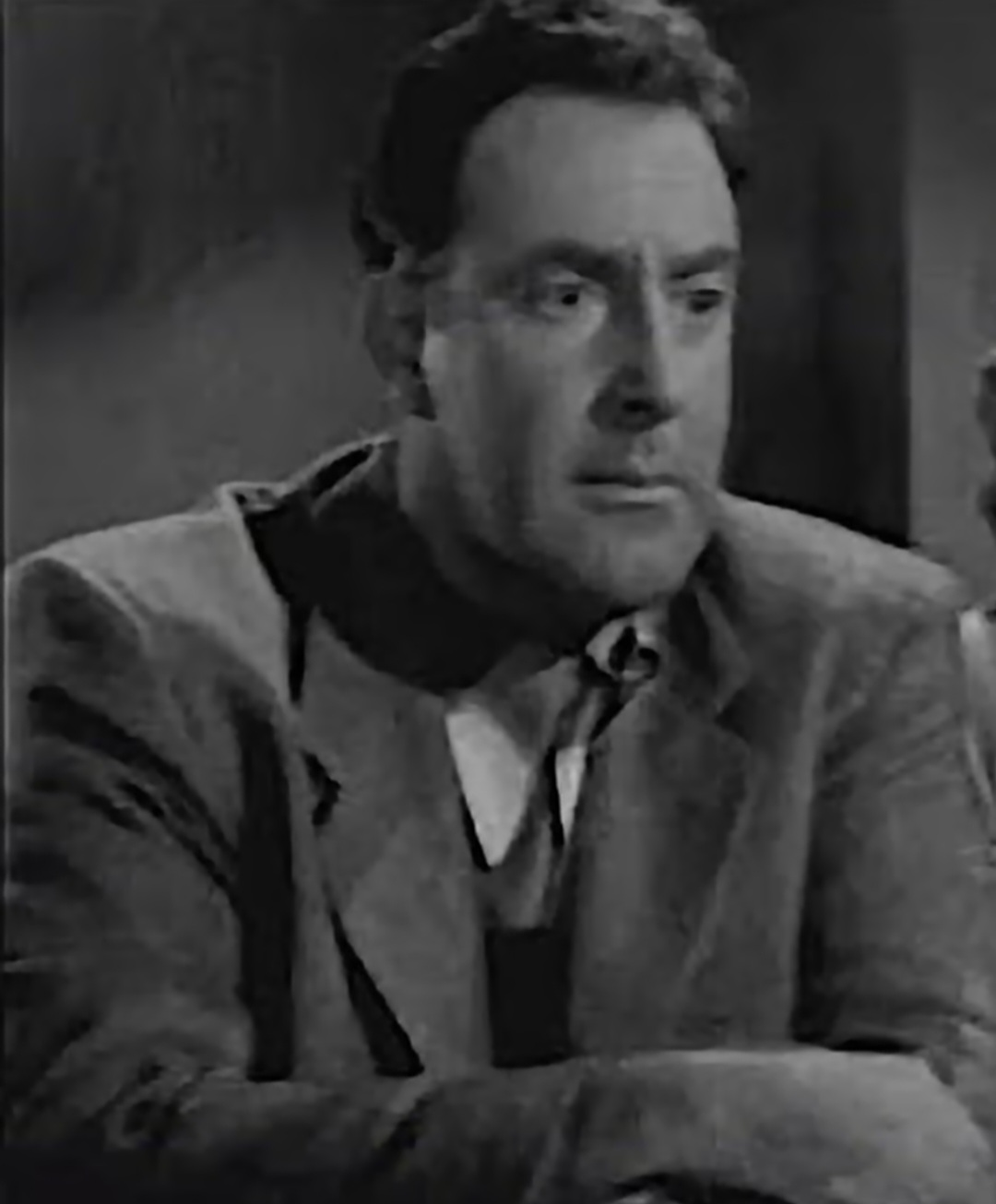
- Barrows in Mesa of Lost Women (1953)
- Born: February 7, 1914; New York City, New York, U.S.
- Died: October 17, 1994 (aged 80); Oxnard, California, U.S.
- Other names: George D. Barrows, George Burrows
- Occupation: Actor
- Years active: 1934–1982

George D. Barrows (New York, February 7, 1914 – Oxnard, October 17, 1994) was an American actor known for playing Ro-Man in the film Robot Monster. He was the son of actor Henry A. Barrows. He often wore a gorilla suit for his film roles. Excluding his gorilla roles, Barrows usually played bit parts in films and was rarely credited for his work.

== Career ==
Barrows built the gorilla suit he used in Robot Monster, Gorilla at Large, and other films. It is currently in the collection of the Natural History Museum of Los Angeles County.

He also appeared in the game show Do You Trust Your Wife?.

== Filmography ==
Film
Year	Title	Role	Notes
1934	Tarzan and His Mate	Gorilla	Uncredited
1936	College Holiday	Dancer	Uncredited
1939	The Hunchback of Notre Dame	Minor role	Uncredited
1940	Buck Benny Rides Again	Dancer	Uncredited
1940	The Son of Monte Cristo	Minor role	Uncredited
1941	King of the Texas Rangers	Dirigible Lieutenant	Uncredited
1941	Honolulu Lu	Sailor	Uncredited
1942	Crossroads	Lecture Guest	Uncredited
1942	Mrs. Wiggs of the Cabbage Patch	Minor role	Uncredited
1942	Fall In	Fifth Columnist in Brawl	Uncredited
1943	Something to Shout About	Aloysius - the Masseur	Uncredited
1946	Three Little Girls in Blue	Man at Hunt Club	Uncredited
1946	Dick Tracy vs. Cueball	Crewman	Uncredited
1946	Magnificent Doll	Jedson	Uncredited
1947	Suddenly, It's Spring	Military Policeman at Dock	Uncredited
1947	New Orleans	Moving Man	Uncredited
1947	Desperate	Train Passenger	Uncredited
1947	Crossfire	Military Policeman	Uncredited
1947	The Exile	Loyalist	Uncredited
1948	The Street With No Name	Bouncer at Gym	Uncredited
1948	Joan of Arc	French Soldier	Uncredited
1948	Adventures of Don Juan	Duke de Lorca's Guard	Uncredited
1948	Wake of the Red Witch	Seaman	Uncredited
1949	Boston Blackie's Chinese Venture	Policeman at Murder Scene	Uncredited
1949	Tulsa	Table player at Gambling Emporium	Uncredited
1949	Barbary Pirate	Pirate	Uncredited
1949	Scene of the Crime	Policeman	Uncredited
1950	Mark of the Gorilla	Henchman	Uncredited
1950	Cargo to Capetown	Seaman at Engine	Uncredited
1950	Triple Trouble	Prison Guard	Uncredited
1950	Walk Softly, Stranger	Man at Bar	Uncredited
1950	Last of the Buccaneers	Pirate	Uncredited
1951	Valentino	Pirate in 'Moran of the Lady Letty'	Uncredited
1951	Law of the Badlands	Barfly	Uncredited
1951	M	Policeman	Uncredited
1951	Jim Thorpe – All-American	Football Player	Uncredited
1951	The Whip Hand	Federal Agent	Uncredited
1952	A Girl in Every Port	Marine Sentry	Uncredited
1952	Denver and Rio Grande	Railroad Worker	Uncredited
1952	Francis Goes to West Point	Plant Workman	Uncredited
1952	Dreamboat	Commandant in Silent Movie	Uncredited
1952	Les Misérables	Gendarme	Uncredited
1953	Jalopy	Jalopy Driver	Uncredited
1953	Code Two	Henchman with Rifle	Uncredited
1953	The Abbott and Costello Show	Bingo's Father / Gorilla	TV series, 2 episodes
1953	Robot Monster	Ro-Man / Great Guidance	Dual roles
1953	Mesa of Lost Women	George, the male nurse	
1953	Tarzan and the She-Devil	Guard	Uncredited
1953	All the Brothers Were Valiant	Fighter in mutiny	Uncredited
1954	Duffy of San Quentin	Convict	Uncredited
1954	Stories of the Century	Henchman in saloon	1 episode
1954	The Lone Wolf	Joe Reed	1 episode
1954	Gorilla at Large	Goliath the Gorilla	Uncredited
1954	Princess of the Nile	Guard	Uncredited
1954	Demetrius and the Gladiators	Gladiator	Uncredited
1954	Outlaw's Daughter	'Rock' Swenson	
1954	I Led 3 Lives	Mako	1 episode
1955	Captain Midnight	Fleck	1 episode
1955	Son of Sinbad	Khalif Officer	Uncredited
1955	The Adventures of Captain Africa	Orang the Gorilla	Serial, Uncredited
1955	Tennessee's Partner	Townsman	Uncredited
1955	Buruuba	Gorilla	
1956	Sergeant Preston of the Yukon	Freighter / Sourdough	TV series, 2 episodes
1956	A Day of Fury	Card player	Uncredited
1956	Behind the High Wall	Guard	Uncredited
1956	Flight to Hong Kong	Janvoort	Uncredited
1956	Science Fiction Theatre	Adam the watchman / Naval officer	TV series, 2 episodes
1956	Cheyenne	Buck / Poker Player	TV series, 2 episodes
1957	The Night Runner	Bus driver	
1957	Hold That Hypnotist	Pirate	Uncredited
1957	The Kettles on Old MacDonald's Farm	Hunter	Uncredited
1957	Highway Patrol	George Bennett	Episode: "Stripped Cars"
1958	The Brothers Karamazov	MP	Uncredited
1958	Frankenstein's Daughter	Mack	
1958	The Buccaneer	City Guard Turnkey	Uncredited
1958-1961	Peter Gunn	Second Hood / Hoodlum / Cal Weaver	TV series, 3 episodes
1959	Imitation of Life	Furniture Mover	Uncredited
1959	The Jayhawkers!	Captain	Uncredited
1960	Oklahoma Territory	Mr. Bailey	Uncredited
1960	Have Gun-Will Travel	Bar Waiter – Tough	Episode: "Love's Young Dream"
1961	The Last Time I Saw Archie	Soldier in Jeep	Uncredited
1963	The Black Zoo	Victor the Gorilla	Uncredited
1964	The Addams Family	Policeman / Gorgo the Gorilla	2 episodes
1966	The Ghost in the Invisible Bikini	Monstro the Gorilla	
1966	The Beverly Hillbillies	The Gorilla-Thomas F. Kelly	TV series, 2 episodes
1966	The Man from U.N.C.L.E.	Baby the Gorilla	Episode: "The My Friend the Gorilla Affair"
1967	Hillbillys in a Haunted House	Anatole the Gorilla	
1968	Panic in the City	Ernest	
1969	Hello, Dolly!	Policeman	Uncredited
1970	Nanny and the Professor	1st Truck Driver	Episode: "The Prodigy"
1970	Marcus Welby, M.D.	Mr. Wayne	Episode: "Dance to No Music"
1971	Hacksaw	Olney Curtis	TV movie
1973	The President's Plane is Missing	Mr. Meyers	TV movie
1978	The Incredible Hulk	Elliot the Gorilla	Episode: "The Beast Within"
1979	The Frisco Kid	Ticket Purchaser	
1981	Choices	Grandpa	
1982	Tuxedo Warrior	Muldoon	
