= Stardust in Your Eyes =

1953 film by Phil Tucker

- Directed by: Phil Tucker
- Written by: Trustin Howard (as "Slick Slavin")
- Produced by: Phil Tucker
- Starring: Slick Slavin
- Cinematography: Jack Greenhalgh
- Music by: Slick Slavin (song, "My Heart Is Owned and Operated by You")
- Production companies: Third Dimensional Pictures, Inc.
- Distributed by: Astor Pictures
- Release date: June 24, 1953
- Running time: 8 minutes
- Country: United States
- Language: English

Stardust in Your Eyes is a 1953 short subject filmed in 3-D, starring night-club comic Trustin Howard (as "Slick Slavin") and was originally shot to accompany the 3-D feature Robot Monster.

In the short, Slick tells the audience how their favorite stars will look and sound in 3-D, as done in impressions to his own tune, "My Heart Is Owned and Operated by You." Slavin does impressions of James Cagney, Ronald Colman, Charles Laughton, James Stewart, Sydney Greenstreet, Peter Lorre, and Humphrey Bogart.

The short was released on home video in 2023 by 3-D Film Archive, in 3D, on the 3D blu-ray of Robot Monster.
