= Cease Fire (1953 film) =

1953 film by Owen Crump

- Directed by: Owen Crump
- Written by: Walter Doniger
- Story by: Owen Crump
- Produced by: Hal Wallis
- Starring: Capt Roy Thompson Jr
- Cinematography: Ellis W. Carter
- Edited by: John Woodcock
- Music by: Dimitri Tiomkin
- Distributed by: Paramount Pictures
- Release date: November 24, 1953
- Running time: 75 minutes
- Country: United States
- Box office: $1 million

Cease Fire! is an American 1953 war movie directed by Owen Crump. The film featured real ammunition and real soldiers that were filmed on location in Korea, and was the first 3D war movie filmed in an actual theatre of operations.

== Plot ==
The film is presented as several fictional events set on the eve of the Korean War ceasefire, introduced by General Mark W. Clark. At Panmunjom, two American war correspondents quarrel over whether the peace negotiations will produce an end to the hostilities; jaded elder writer Powell criticizes younger journalist Bateman for his idealism, while Bateman condemns Powell's cynical outlook.

On the field of battle, Army Lieutenant Thompson of Easy Company receives word of the peace negotiations, but reminds his men their mission will continue until a final agreement is reached. He selects thirteen soldiers for a special reconnaissance patrol, including Elliott, with whom he has a fractious relationship, the jolly One Ton, black soldier Mayes, Bad News, whose presence is believed to be unlucky by the other men, and Korean scout Kim. Kim's wife is due to deliver their first child, and he sends word through a friend to his wife he expects to come home soon.

The patrol is tasked with the capture and investigation of Red Top, a strategic point overlooking a large valley with unknown enemy activity. Their initial approach is masked by friendly artillery fire, but Elliott is concerned that stopping the fire to let them through will alert the enemy of their presence. Agreeing, the Lieutenant routes them through a narrow treacherous canyon periodically harassed by enemy bombardment. They find two British soldiers, one of them injured; the senior of the two agrees to help them through an unmarked minefield in return for assisting the injured man. Tragically, one of the patrol's men is lost to the mines when he slips down an embankment.

As peace negotiations continue, Bateman hears of Powell's hopes being dashed in previous wars, and begins to understand his perspective. Meanwhile, the patrol comes under attack as they approach Red Top; Elliott and One Ton manage to outflank and kill two Korean soldiers manning a machine gun emplacement, but the battalion commanders radio the patrol that 300 Chinese soldiers are on the way. The patrol splits into a support group and an advance team, and their final assault on Red Top meets terrific resistance, knocking out their radio. Unable to establish contact, the commanders are nevertheless able to send Army tanks and Navy and Air Force air support to attack the Chinese brigade as the advance team closes in on the summit. In the battle the lieutenant is injured by gunfire and Kim is killed trying to rescue him, but the patrol is able to hold the hill. They only learn of the newly declared cease-fire as they bring back Kim's lifeless body.

Back at Panmunjom, both Powell and Bateman are elated by the news of peace, while in Kim's village, his wife delivers a healthy new baby.

== Cast ==
- Capt. Roy Thompson Jr. as Lieut. Thompson
- Cpl. Henry Goszkowski as Patrol Sgt. Goszkowski
- Sgt. Richard Karl Elliott as Elliott
- Sfc. Albert Bernard Cook as One Ton
- Pvt. Johnnie L. Mayes as Mayes
- Cheong Yul Bak as Kim
- Sfc. Howard E. Strait as Strait
- Pfc. Gilbert L. Gazaille as "Bad News" Willis
- Pfc. Harry L. Hofelich as Hofelich
- Cpl. Charlie W. Owen as Owen
- Cpl. Harold D. English as English
- Pfc. Edmund J. Pruchniewski as Pruchniewski
- Pvt. Otis Wright as Wright
- Pfc. Ricardo Carrasco as Carrasco

== Reception ==
Bosley Crowther said the film is "a robust hair-raising realization of the ruggedness of the foot soldiers' war in the ugly hill of Korea."

== Release ==
The film was subsequently re-released in Blu-ray 3D by Kino Lorber.
