= Harry K. Fairall =

Harry Kenneth Fairall
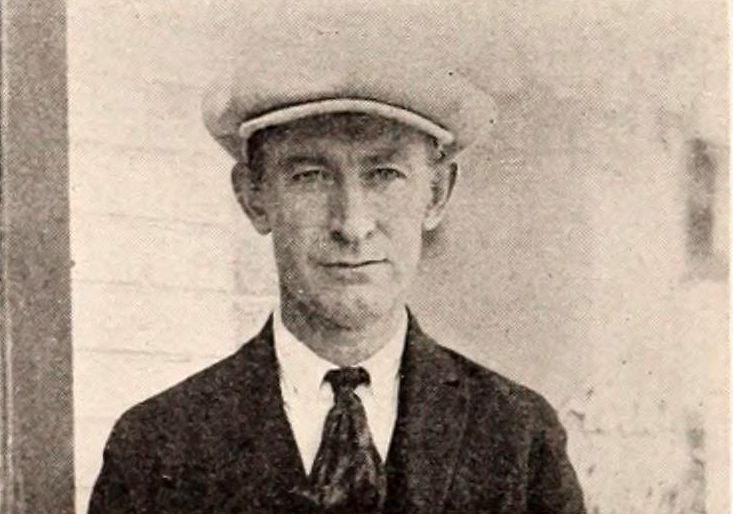
- Born: May 14, 1882
- Died: July 20, 1958 (aged 76)
- Occupation: Camera operator
- Known for: The Power of Love

Harry K. Fairall (May 14, 1882 – July 20, 1958) was an American camera operator, inventor and producer, and founder of the Binocular Stereoscopic Film Company, of Loas Angeles, California. He is known for his effort to establish stereoscopic movies in the 1920s, obtaining a series of patents covering the technologies to produce binocular films. His patents covered the process of exposing a celluloid based film reel, covered in a gelatine based emulsion, to a series of images intended for the left eye, through a colour filter, applying a second emulsion coating, and repeating the process for the images intended for the right eye, through a different colour filter. The resulting film, if later projected and viewed through binocular goggles, with matching left and right eye, coloured, lenses, to those used in its production, achieved a simulated 3D experience.

The only publicly released film produced with Fairall's anaglyph system is the now-lost The Power of Love (1922).
