= Trustin Howard =

American singer

Trustin Howard (December 18, 1923 – April 20, 2017) was an American vocalist, songwriter, actor, nightclub comic, television writer and author.

== Early life ==
Howard was born Howard Trustin Slavin in Chicago, Illinois, United States, and began his acting career as a pre-teen. By the age of 15 he’d introduced his persona Slick Slavin at the Chicago Theater.

== Media career ==
His nightclub act led to film roles in Philbert (for which he provided the voice of the animated title character), Speed Crazy and a small part in King Creole.

Howard branched into writing, eventually becoming the head writer of the Joey Bishop Show, writing episodes of This is Your Life, and numerous, including The Night of Stars.

He recorded singles for the Acclaim and Imperial labels and the comedy album The “Groove” World of Trustin Howard

Howard authored fiction (The Channeler), non-fiction (Winchell and Runyon) and the autobiography My Life With Regis and Joey and Practically Everyone Else.

== Awards ==
Howard was honored with a lifetime membership in the Writers Guild of America.
