= Catfight =

Term for physical conflict between women

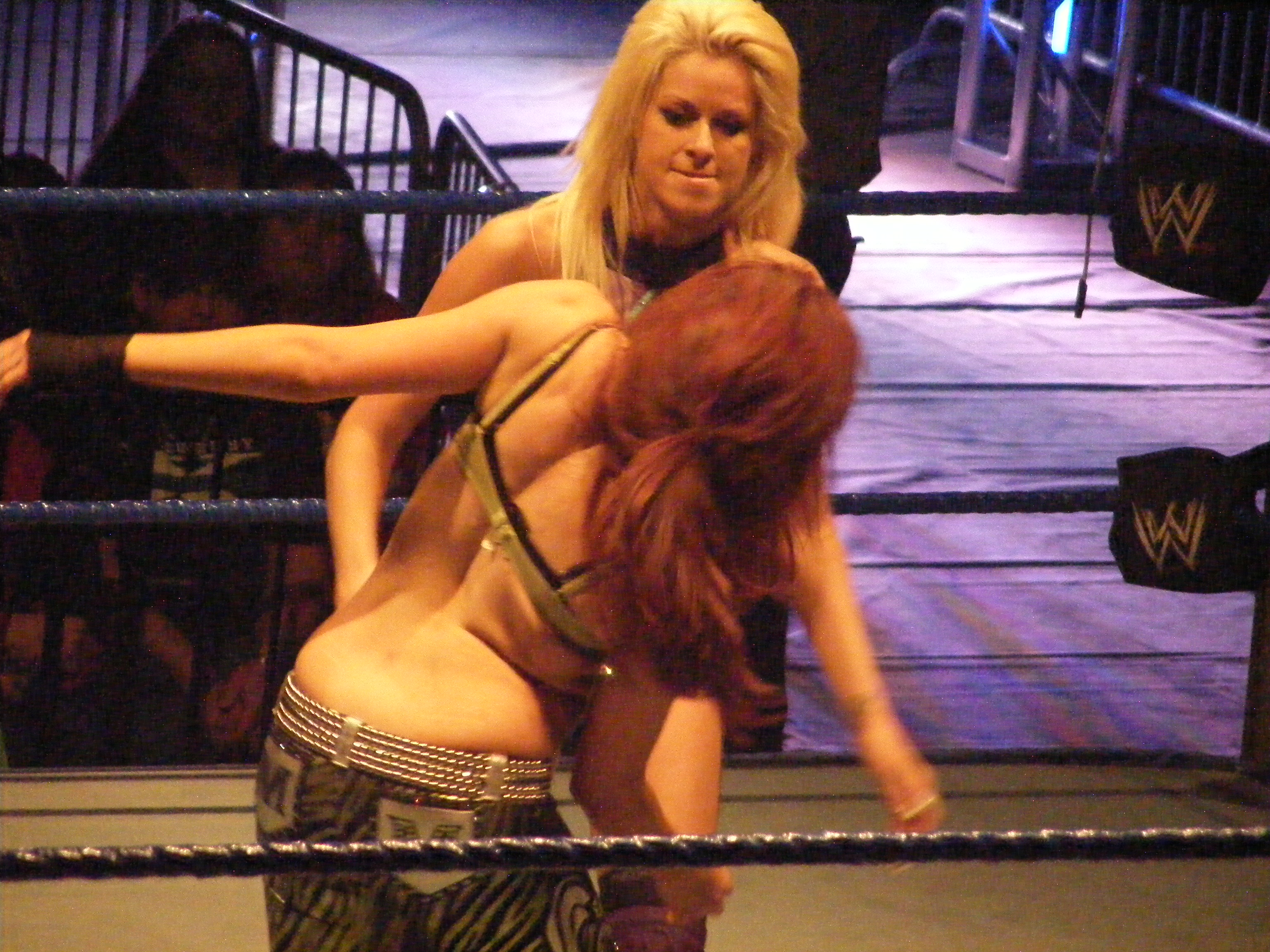
WWE Divas wrestling at a WWE show, February 28, 2009

Catfight (also girl fight) is a term for an altercation between two women, often characterized as involving scratching, shoving, slapping, choking, punching, kicking, wrestling, biting, spitting, hair-pulling, and clothing-shredding. It can also be used to describe women insulting each other verbally or engaged in an intense competition for men, power, or occupational success. The catfight has been a staple of American news media and popular culture since the 1940s, and use of the term is often considered derogatory or belittling. Some observers (e.g., Susan J. Douglas) argue that in its purest form, the word refers to two women, one blonde and the other a brunette (blonde versus brunette rivalry), fighting each other. However, the term is not exclusively used to indicate a fight between women, and many formal definitions do not invoke gender.

== Etymology ==
The term catfight was recorded by the Oxford English Dictionary as the title and subject of an 1824 mock heroic poem by Ebenezer Mack. In the United States, it was first recorded as being used to describe a fight between women in an 1854 book written by Benjamin G. Ferris who wrote about Mormon women fighting over their shared husband. Their houses, according to Ferris, were designed to keep women "as much as possible, apart, and prevent those terrible catfights which sometimes occur, with all the accompaniments of billingsgate [vulgar and coarse language], torn caps, and broken broomsticks." The word cat was originally a contemptuous term for either sex, but eventually came to refer to a woman considered loose or sexually promiscuous, or one regarded as spiteful, backbiting, and malicious.

== Responses ==
=== Male ===
Women fighting each other, particularly over a man, is a long-held heterosexual male fantasy. Portrayals of catfights in cartoons, movies and advertising often display participants as attractive, with "supermodel physiques", dishevelled and missing articles of clothing, and catfights are often described by media aimed primarily at men as sexy.

Culturally, we think of the catfight as bikini-clad bimbos slapping each other around and wrestling. They're sexualized and devalued.

— Onur Tukel, Director, Catfight

=== Female ===
Women have often been critical of the term catfight, particularly when it is used in ways that may seem to inappropriately sexualize, neutralize, or trivialize disagreements among women on serious topics.

Feminist historians say use of the term catfight to label female opponents goes back to 1940, when American newspapers characterized as a catfight a dispute between Clare Boothe Luce and journalist Dorothy Thompson over which candidate to support in the 1940 presidential campaign. One newspaper called it "a confrontation between two blonde Valkryies", and journalist Walter Winchell, upon running into Luce and Thompson at a nightclub, reportedly urged them not to fight, saying, "Ladies, ladies, remember there are gentlemen present."

In the 1970s, the American news media began to use the term catfight to describe women's disagreements about issues related to women's rights, such as the Equal Rights Amendment.

A University of British Columbia's Sauder School of Business survey found that both female and male observers judged female vs. female conflicts to have more negative impacts on the workplace environment than conflicts that involved men.

== Usage in popular culture ==
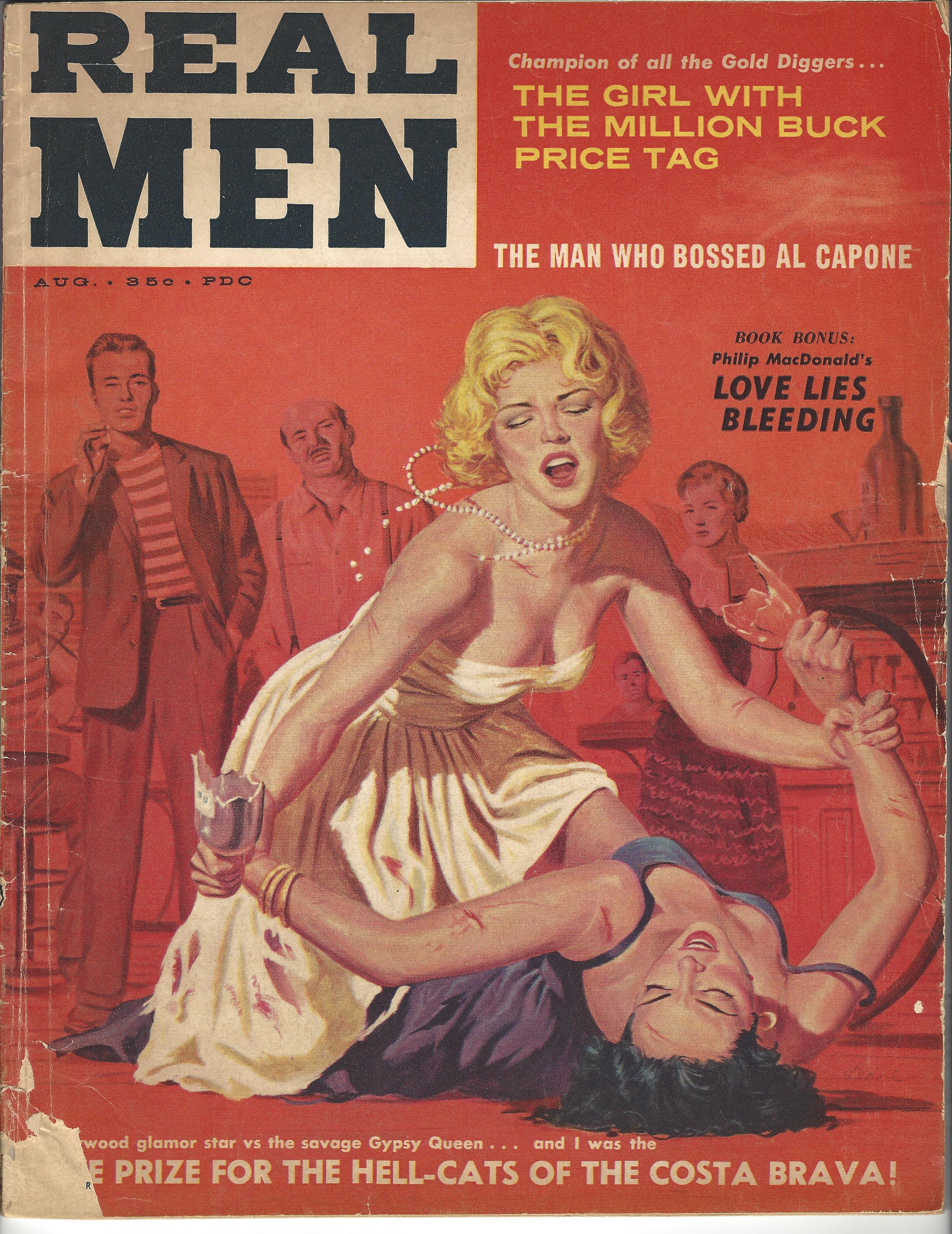
Catfight imagery, as Rachel Reinke points out, is often found in media that caters to a male audience and, as Susan Douglas has noted, frequently involves a blonde and a brunette.

Catfights first began appearing in American popular culture in the 1950s when postwar pioneers of pornography such as Irving Klaw produced film clips of women engaged in catfighting and wrestling. Klaw used many models and actresses in his works, including Bettie Page. The popularity of watching women fight increased in the postwar years and eventually moved into the mainstream of society. In the 1960s, catfights became popular in B movies such as Russ Meyer's Faster, Pussycat! Kill! Kill! and the 1969 animated Boris Karloff movie Mad Monster Party?. In the 1970s and 1980s, catfights began to make appearances in women in prison films, in roller derby, and in nighttime soap operas such as Dallas and Dynasty.

Dynasty starred John Forsythe as an oil tycoon and patriarch of a wealthy family that lived in Denver. The show co-starred blonde Linda Evans and brunette Joan Collins. The two women had a number of fights, both verbal and physical, during the show's 9-year run on ABC. Designed to compete with Dallas, a highly popular evening drama on CBS, Dynasty's first-year ratings were unremarkable. For the second season, the producers introduced the dark-haired Collins as a foil to the blonde Evans and hoped that her "bitchy persona" would enhance the show's ratings, which it did. Wanting the ratings to go even higher, Douglas S. Cramer, Dynasty's producer suggested that the two women have a "knockdown, drag out fight". Cramer, in a 2008 interview, claimed that everybody loved the catfights except Joan Collins because "Linda was so much stronger than she was." In a 2023 interview, Collins confirmed that she hated the catfights because "... they were so stupid."

Dynasty upped the ante ... On one side was the blonde stay at home Krystal Carrington ... in the other corner was the most delicious bitch ever seen on television, the dark haired, scheming, career vixen, Alexis Carrington Colby ... Krystal just wanted to make her husband happy; Alexis wanted to control the world. How could you not love a catfight between these two?

The Dynasty director's blueprint for the first fight was, according to Evans, an "outrageous catfight" she had almost a decade earlier with Stefanie Powers in the detective series McCloud, starring Dennis Weaver. The fight occurs during an argument they are having in Evans' apartment when Powers, on her way out, grabs a bottle of seltzer water and sprays down Evans. Before she reaches the door, Evans grabs Powers and the two women engage in spirited catfight, wrecking the apartment in the process. During the fight, Powers' blouse is partially torn off, exposing her black bra, a surprising level of undress for network television in that era. Evans eventually overpowers her brunette opponent and is holding her head down in a water-filled aquarium when Weaver walks in, which ends the fight.

Catfights, both real and staged, are a staple of daytime television talk shows and reality television shows such as The Jerry Springer Show, The Bachelor, For Love or Money, and The Real Housewives series, where women are frequently presented as being in continual competition with each other for love and professional success. In 2009, ABC-TV promoted The Bachelor with the voiceover narration "Let the catfights begin", and reality television shows have frequently overlaid sound effects of hissing cats onto scenes featuring women arguing or competing with each other.

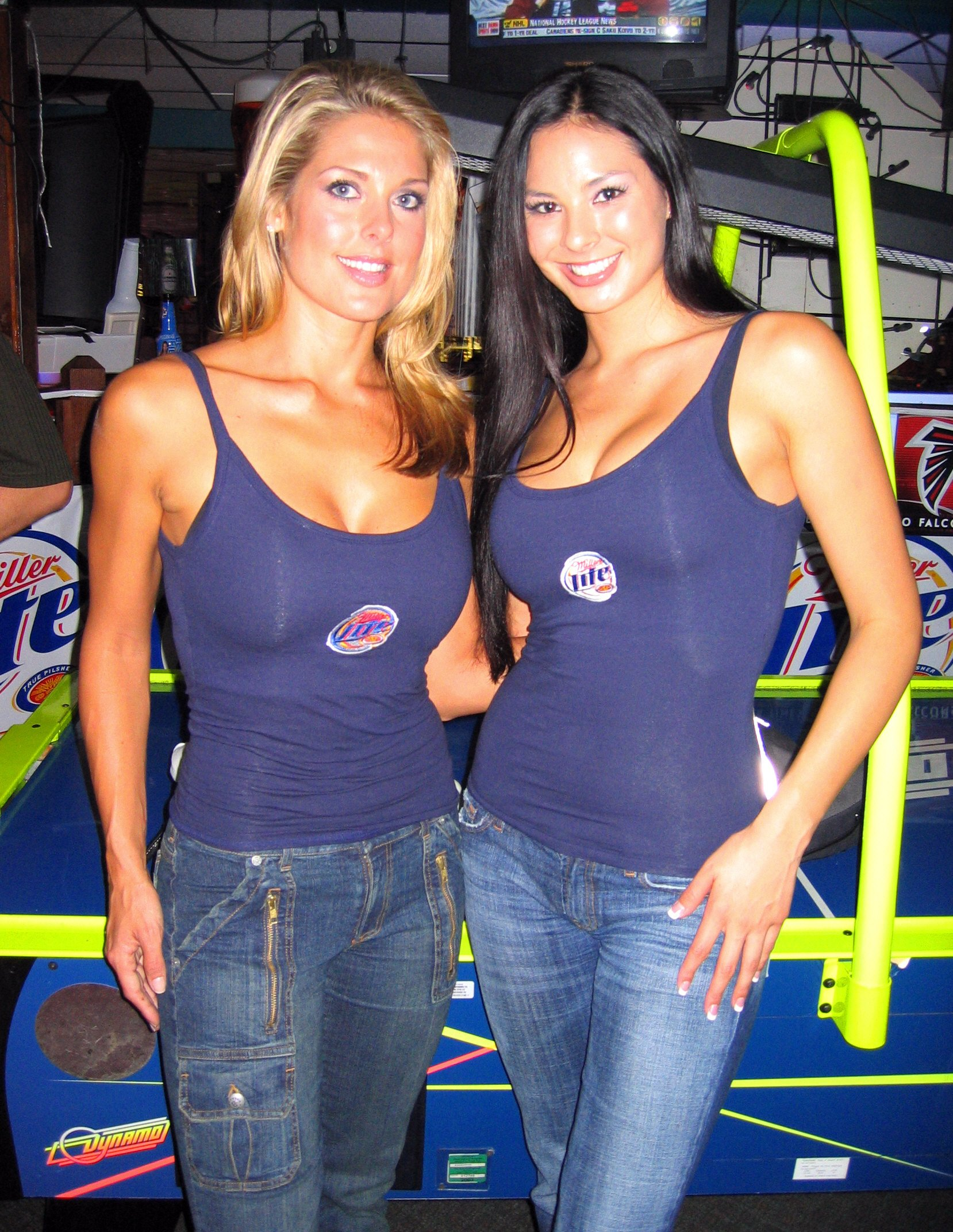
A 2003 commercial for Miller Lite beer, featured a catfight between Tanya Ballinger and Kitana Baker

In 2002, an SABMiller television commercial called "Catfight" featured two young beautiful women drinking a beer in an outside cafe. Their polite conversation quickly turned into an argument about whether Miller Lite beer's best aspect was its taste or the fact that it was less filling than other beers. The argument led to a fight where one of the girls knocked the other into an adjacent pool. The women quickly lost most of their clothes and continued the fight clad in only in their underwear. Before the fight came to a conclusion, the scene faded out and the viewers saw that it was a fantasy dreamed up by two men in a bar discussing what would make a great commercial. The scene would later cut to the girls, stripped down to their underwear, wrestling in a mud pit. An "uncensored" version was also filmed that included an alternate ending where the mud-covered girls kiss. Predictably, one critic noted, the fight was between a blonde and a brunette. The campaign generated considerable controversy, but sales of Miller Lite subsequently declined by 3%.

More than any other aspect of the catfight in today's culture, the catfight's sexually arousing potential is exploited for numerous purposes. The phenomenon of catfighting as erotic entertainment for straight men is widely documented throughout the Internet, television, film, and even pornography. On numerous websites ... web users are overwhelmingly presented with catfighting as highly sexual, even pornographic. So many websites act as sources of catfights as pornography that it would be hard to believe the catfight can be interpreted in any other way. Venturing onto ... these pages will lead a viewer to an abundance of videos and images of objectified women fighting with each other by pulling hair, scratching, and even biting each other. The interpretation of the catfight as sexy and gratifying for men is hardly uncommon on the Internet.
—Rachel Reinke: "Catfight: A Feminist Analysis"

A 2019 article in The New York Times titled "Me-OW! It's the End of the Catfight", pointed how the term has been slowly falling out of favor in light of the #MeToo movement, "calling any conflict between women a catfight is understood to be sexist, and enthusiasm has generally dampened for women fighting". Notwithstanding, the author pointed out, remnants remained and cited the tabloid-created feud between Catherine, Duchess of Cambridge and Meghan, Duchess of Sussex as an example.

== In the film and television industry ==
The entertainment industry has produced many works that include catfights. Below is a selection of notable films and television episodes, many of them featuring major movie stars engaged in fighting.

- OSS 117: Cairo, Nest of Spies. Academy Award winning director Michel Hazanavicius directed this 2007 French spy spoof that featured a clothes shredding catfight between Bérénice Bejo and Aure Atika. Instead of breaking up the fight, Jean Dujardin, in the role of OSS Agent 117, watches with glee as the two barefoot brunettes battle each other.
- 2 Days in the Valley. Teri Hatcher and Charlize Theron star in what the Los Angeles Times referred to as the "spandex cat fight of the year". According to director John Herzfeld the two women, who refused to use stunt doubles, were hitting each other so hard that at one point the filming was stopped after Hatcher connected to Theron's chin so that the resulting bruise could be hidden by make-up. After filming, when Hatcher was asked about the "catfight", she responded "It was actually a brawl—not a catfight because technically a 'catfight' is hair pulling and there was none of that."
- Back from Eternity. A 1956 remake of Five Came Back starring Phyllis Kirk and Anita Ekberg. Jealous over her apparent attraction to a pilot played by Keith Andes, Kirk starts a fight with Ekberg in a stream while washing clothes. Shooting the scene on a sound set required the creation of a stream with running water and foam rubber rocks to avoid injury to Kirk and Ekberg.

Prison inmates Adele Jergens and Joan Taylor fight each other in the 1956 American International Pictures movie Girls in Prison

- Barfly. Faye Dunaway has a kicking, hair-pulling battle with Alice Krige in a Los Angeles bar, described by the Washington Post's review of the movie as a "cat fight on skid row ... (that is) as preposterous as the script as a whole."
- Carry on Girls. Barbara Windsor and Margaret Nolan in a publicity event for a forthcoming beauty contest, get into a fight over Nolan wearing a silver bikini in a hotel lobby that Windsor says she stole off her in a previous contest, tearing off Nolan's hairpiece, her bikini top, and very nearly her bikini bottoms until contest organisers Sid James and Bernard Bresslaw just about manage to separate them apart. In a scene, shortly afterwards, Windsor said she deliberately provoked the catfight merely to arouse more publicity for the contest.
- Catwoman. Panned by critics, this 2004 movie nonetheless culminates in "a world-class catfight" between co-stars Halle Berry and Sharon Stone.
- Charlie's Angels. Iconic 1970s TV show starring, in its first season, Kate Jackson, Farrah Fawcett, and Jaclyn Smith. Dressed in a white bikini, Smith fought Rosemary Forsyth in the first season's third episode titled "Night of the Strangler". Smith later engaged stuntwoman Heidi von Beltz in a locker room fight during the season-two episode "Angels in the Backfield" (von Beltz would later become quadriplegic as a result of injuries sustained while performing a stunt in The Cannonball Run). Cheryl Ladd joined the cast after Fawcett's departure and fought Shera Danese in season three's episode "Disco Angels".
- Colorado Territory. Dorothy Malone tries to alert the visiting marshal, played by Morris Ankrum, that wanted felons played by Joel McCrea and Virginia Mayo have taken refuge in their ranch house, but is stopped by Mayo. The two women engage in what The Village Voice called one of "The Best Catfights In Hollywood History."
- Community. In The Psychology of Letting Go, the third episode of the second season of the 2009 NBC sitcom, Alison Brie and Gillian Jacobs have a fundraiser rivalry that climaxes in an oil wrestling bout. Todd VanDerWerff, writing for The AV Club, commented "At this point, a comedy throwing its two hot girls into an ironic mud fight is essentially just a non-ironic mud-fight, it's happened so often."
- Comrade X. Hedy Lamarr and Natasha Lytess have a "hair pulling battle" over the affections of Clark Gable in this 1940 movie.
- Destry Rides Again. Marlene Dietrich and Una Merkel engage in "one of the most famous female vs female fights ever captured on film." The New York Times review of the 1939 movie said "The scene that really counts though is the cat-fight between Miss Dietrich's Frenchy and Una Merkel's outraged Mrs. Callahan ... we thought the battle in 'The Women' was an eye-opener, now we realize it was just shadow clawing. For the real thing, with no-holds barred and full access to chairs, tables, glasses, waterbuckets and as much hair that can be snatched from the opponent's scalp, we give you not 'The Women' but the two women who fight it out in Bloody Gulch." Adaptations of the movie include Frenchie starring Shelley Winters and Marie Windsor as the combatants and Destry starring Mari Blanchard and Mary Wickes. All four women, in both of the movies, were shown the Dietrich-Merkel fight in the original, as a point of reference.

The Dietrich-Merkel match-up, a riotous tooth-and-nail catfight lasting over two minutes, took five days to film. Dietrich was adamant about doing as much of her own fighting as was possible on the screen. Co-star Merkel realized that Dietrich wasn't pulling any punches and opted to do her own fighting as well. Both actresses became carried away in the moment in front of the Hal Mohr's camera and came away with scrapes, bruises and splinters. A first aid station was set up off the soundstage for injuries. Pioneering stuntwoman Helen Thurston filled in for Dietrich when the action became too heavy ... but the publicity claimed the stars did all their own stunts in one continuous take and were presented with champagne toasts and applause from the cast and crew. -- Gene Freese, Classic Movie Fight Scenes: 75 Years of Bare Knuckle Brawls, 1914-1989

- Eve. Celeste Yarnall stars in this 1968 film as a female version of Tarzan, living in the jungle with native peoples. Yarnall almost fell to her death while filming her fight scene with Mexican actress Rosenda Monteros when Monteros failed to follow the carefully scripted fight choreography and nearly kicked Yarnall off a 200-foot cliff.
- Four Queens for an Ace. Multiple crêpage de chignons occur in this tongue-in-cheek French Eurospy film starring Roger Hanin. His jealous girlfriend, played by Catherine Allégret, battles Sylva Koscina and Dominique Wilms at various points in the movie.
- From Russia with Love. In the role of James Bond, Sean Connery watches two gypsies engage in what many consider to be one of the entertainment industry's most iconic catfights. The black-haired, dark-eyed, olive-skinned "gypsy" combatants were Martine Beswick and Aliza Gur. According to Beswick, their relationship on the set was not friendly and the film's director, Terence Young encouraged Beswick to get rough with Gur.

I was a very nice girl but Aliza was a cow. We had terrible clashes and I was disgusted with her. I had a lot of anger inside of me so that [fight] scene was a perfect way to work it out. We rehearsed the fight for three weeks but when we shot it, Aliza was really fighting. Everyone encouraged me to fight back, so I did. We got into a real scrapping match.
— Martine Beswick

- Girls in Prison. Inmates Joan Taylor and Adele Jergens fight each other in a muddy field.

Teen age criminals, played by Eve Brent and Eleise Cameron fight in the 1957 crime film Gun Girls

- Go West, Young Lady. Dance hall girl Ann Miller and her rival Penny Singleton have a "rowdy free-for-all hair-pulling fight ... worth the price of admission", in this 1942 western starring Glenn Ford. One biographer noted that the scene was humiliating for Miller, as she lost the energetic fight to Singleton.
- Gun Girls. 1957 American crime film, ridiculed for sloppy production and dialogue as well as for having women in their 20s portray teen-aged criminals. During the movie, Eve Brent fights Eleise Cameron when she finds Cameron in her boyfriend's apartment. Brent would later star as Jane in Tarzan's Fight for Life.
- Gunslinger. Beverly Garland and Allison Hayes fight in this Roger Corman directed western. Garland, who injured her ankle filming an earlier scene, told Corman she was unable to stand up, let alone film a fight scene with Hayes. Corman responded by having a doctor inject her ankle with painkillers. In her biography, Garland said "You could be dead and Roger would find a way to film around that. We filmed the fight scene and I did all my own stunts ... we really scratched, punched and pulled each others hair! Of course I couldn't work for several weeks after that, I couldn't walk on that leg. But Roger got his scenes, that's all that mattered."
- Horrors of Spider Island. Blonde actresses Barbara Valentin as Babs and Eva Schauland as Nelly, fight each other in a remote cabin while a man-spider lurks outside.
- Hot Blood. 1956 musical drama starring Jane Russell and Cornel Wilde where Wilde is tricked by his brother into an arranged marriage with tempestuous Annie Caldash, played by Russell. "One of the liveliest scenes in the movie is a hair pulling battle, blonde vs brunette, when Jane encounters a rival for her hubby's affections ... and a free-for-all with blonde Helen Westcott follows."
- Judex. Georges Franju's re-working of the 1916 silent version culminates in the film's roof top fight scene between evil brunette Diana (Francine Bergé) and good blonde Daisy (Sylva Koscina), where their "good-versus-evil fisticuffs are literalized by their diverging black-and-white attire." Other reviewers have noted the eroticsm of the fight, as the women's legs tangle with each other.
- Kill Bill: Volume 1 and Kill Bill: Volume 2. Uma Thurman in the role of The Bride uses a combination of swords, knives, and martial arts to kill Lucy Liu, Vivica Fox and Daryl Hannah.

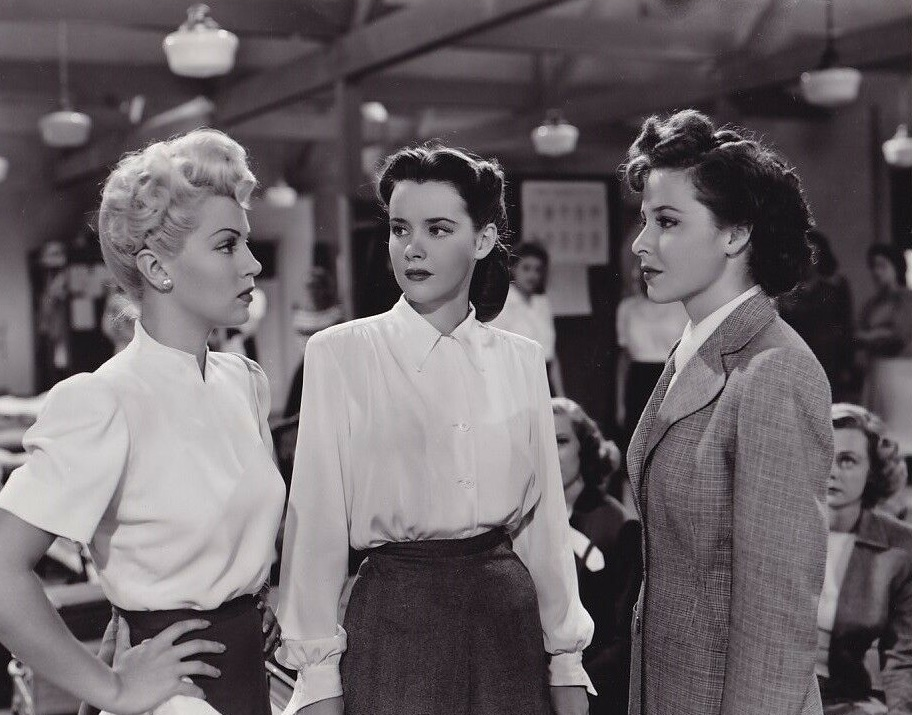
MGM's publicity still of Lana Turner and Lorraine Day in a face-to-face confrontation. Advertisements for the film Keep Your Powder Dry promised the audience a catfight between the two women.

- Kansas City Bomber. Raquel Welch stars in this feature film about the sport of female roller derby. Portraying a divorcee and single parent, Welch in the role of K.C. Carr, engages in a number of fights, most notably against actress Helena Kallianiotes who plays the role of a fading roller derby star, Jackie Burdette. Two weeks into the shoot, Welch suffered a cut lip and swollen face during a fight scene with Kallianiotes. An MGM spokesman said the two actors "got carried away" and Welch "got slugged" by Kallianiotes.
- Keep Your Powder Dry. Metro-Goldwyn-Mayer's advertisements for the 1945 film about the Women's Army Corps promised the audience a catfight between Lorraine Day and Lana Turner. An image of Day slapping Turner in the face was part of the movie's publicity campaign.
- Logan's Run. Brief scene with Jenny Agutter fighting Farrah Fawcett. Allegedly, the fight scene was to be much longer but the director, Michael Anderson became concerned that the two women were pulling each other's hair so hard, that a real fight would erupt.
- Meet Me in Las Vegas. Cyd Charisse and Liliane Montevecchi "rip off jewelry and various parts of clothing" in a dance fight choreographed by Hermes Pan to the song "Frankie and Johnny" performed by Sammy Davis Jr. The dance sequence took over a month to rehearse and an entire week to film. The film received an Oscar nomination for best musical score.
- Mesa of Lost Women. Jackie Coogan stars as a mad scientist in this 1953 B movie directed by Ron Ormond. Near the film's conclusion actresses Mary Hill and Tandra Quinn fight each other in Coogan's laboratory.
- Mission: Impossible. In a 1966 episode titled Old Man Out, former Miss America Mary Ann Mobley and Barbara Bain fake a lengthy cat fight as a diversionary tactic while the Mission Impossible team breaks a man out of prison.
- Naked Gun. Saloon girls Veda Ann Borg and Mara Corday fight over stolen money in this 1956 western

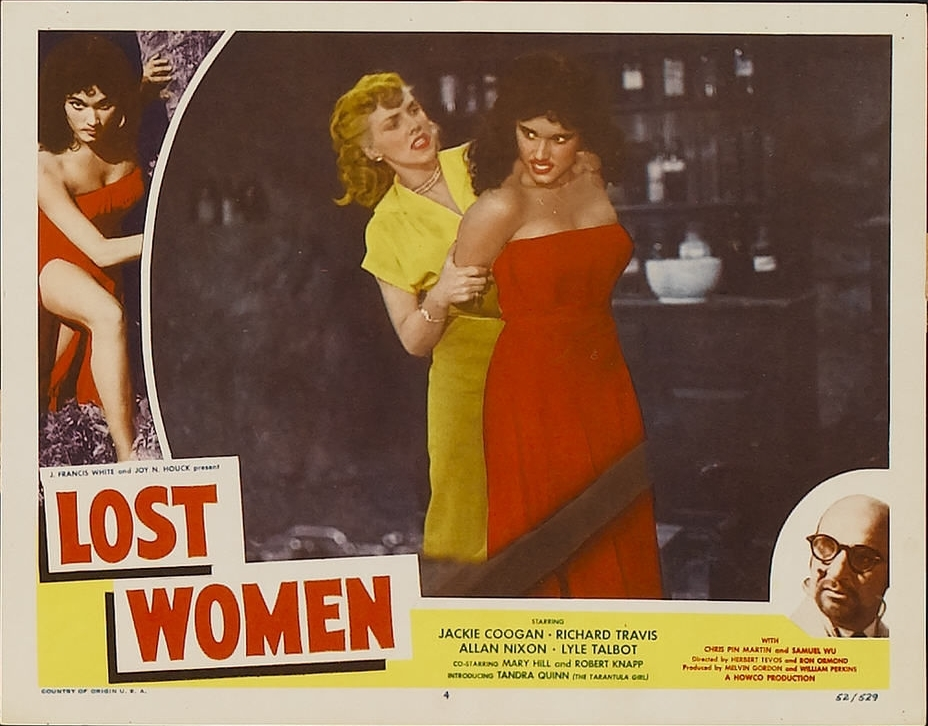
Actress Mary Hill wrestles Jackie Coogan's laboratory assistant in the 1953 "B movie" Mesa of Lost Women

- Off Limits. In this 1953 film, during a boxing match, where one of the fighters is being managed by Bob Hope, two of Hope's girlfriends, Joan Taylor and Carolyn Jones, get into a boxing match of their own, distracting both the audience and the boxers fighting in the ring.
- One Million Years B.C.. Remake of the similarly titled 1940 film. The remake featured two barefoot, bikini-clad women, one being the "good blonde" Raquel Welch and the other, the "bad brunette" Martine Beswick, who get into one of the most famous catfights in film history.
- Perils of Nyoka. A 1942 movie serial shown in 15 parts, starring Kay Aldridge as the imperiled Nyoka and Lorna Gray as her female nemesis, the evil Vultura. Aldridge, attractively attired in jungle shorts, and Gray also attractively attired in a revealing sarong, engage in multiple fights, the climactic battle occurring in the serial's final chapter when Vultura attempts to escape with a valuable treasure, only to be confronted by Nyoka. "The wrestling match between the two girls, their naked legs entwined, had something for everyone." Watching the women fight was Vultura's pet gorilla who, seeing that Nyoka was winning the fight, launched a spear at her, but missed and instead killed Vultura.
- Planet Earth. A 1974 made-for-TV science fiction movie created by Gene Roddenberry about a post-apocalyptic matriarchal society where women keep men drugged and use them as slaves. Led by John Saxon in the role of Dylan Hunt, a team of outsiders that includes Janet Margolin as Harper-Smythe, visits a village looking for a missing friend. Hunt is quickly taken prisoner by Diana Muldaur in the role of Marg, the head Amazon. Smythe quickly realizes she will have to fight Marg to get him back.

Marc Daniels brings professional polish and brisk pacing to the telefilm and the action sequences are very nicely-staged ... there's a very well-done catfight between Muldaur and Margolin where it's clear that the two actresses are doing much of the stuntwork themselves.

Prior to that encounter, Smythe fights actress Sally Kemp in the role of an Amazon housemistress named Treece. The confrontation was interrupted by Treece's children who were clearly distraught at the site of their mother fighting another woman.

This mirrors a scene in Genesis II in which the shock wave from a nuclear explosion Hunt has triggered strikes on a Pax lookout just as a mother has brought her young children out to see the stars. There and in the Planet Earth scene, the heroes witness the effect of their own violence on children, forcing them to rethink the use of force—a very effective and intelligent pacifistic touch from Roddenberry.

- San Antone. 1953 western where "bitchy Southern belle Arleen Whelan" attacks Mexican Katy Jurado with a knife. Jurado disarms Wheelan and the two fight each other until broken up by returning members of the group.

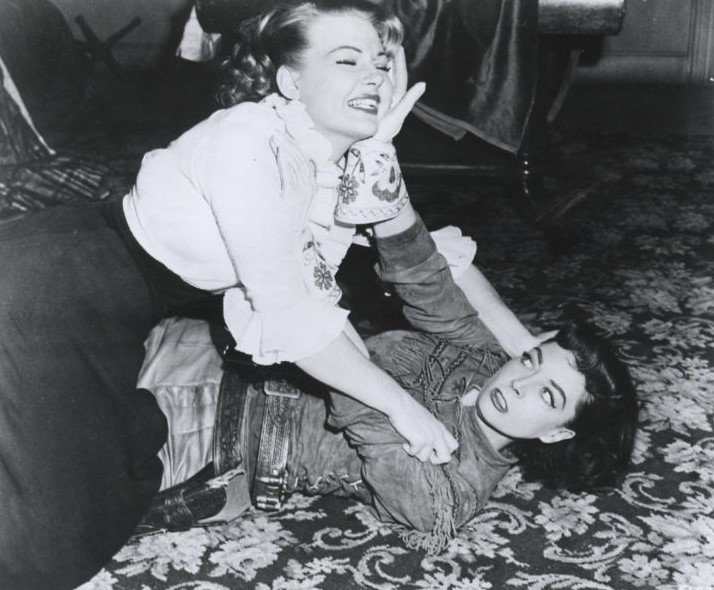
Belle Starr fights off blonde detective Frankie Adams in the TV show Stories of the Century

- Star in the Dust. Actresses Randy Stuart and Coleen Gray invited their husbands to watch the filming of their fight scene in this 1956 western. At the conclusion, Gray recalled in a later interview, the women dusted themselves off, but the two husbands "were pale and clammy and weak" having watched their wives engage in a fistfight.
- Stories of the Century. Premier episode of the 1954 season featured Detective Frankie Adams, played by Mary Castle, attempting to subdue Marie Windsor, in the role of Belle Starr
- Swashbuckler. During a bar scene, Geneviève Bujold accuses another woman of owning a trinket that is rightfully hers. The dispute leads to a fight between Bujold and stunt actress Lee Pulford. The fight ends with Bujold knocking out her opponent. In an interview after the release of the film, the blonde-haired Pulford, who described herself as very athletic, said that Bujold didn't know how to fight and that during the rehearsals she was extra careful not to hurt the slender French-Canadian actress, one of the film's major co-stars.
- Tarzan and the Slave Girl. Jane, played by Vanessa Brown and Denise Darcel in the role of Lola, have a hair pulling, furniture throwing catfight in this 1950 Tarzan entry. In a later interview, Brown claimed that "Denise was impossible ... I really didn't like her. I don't think the catfight scene took much preparation on my part."
- The Bounty Hunter. Marie Windsor and Dolores Dorn engage in a "hair-pulling, kicking battle" over a gun in this 1954 Randolph Scott western.
- The Leech Woman. At gun point, Coleen Gray fights Gloria Talbott. Before the scene was filmed, Gray mentioned to Talbott that she was pretty strong and wouldn't have any problem taking the gun away. Talbott was taken aback by the comment and approached the scene with the intent of overpowering her blonde co-star even though the script called for Gray to win the fight. Years later, Talbott admitted in an interview that Gray was right, she was much stronger than Talbott, throwing her into a closet as the two women went off-script, wrestling each other.
- The Mini-Skirt Mob. Diane McBain stars as the leader of an all-female motorcycle gang. Furious that her ex-boyfriend married another woman (played by Sherry Jackson), she spends the entire movie terrorizing the couple and, at one point, gives a vicious beating to Jackson. Off-screen, McBain and Jackson were close friends and shared a Hollywood apartment.

Janet Leigh tries to stop Letitia Roman from escaping in an episode of The Man from U.N.C.L.E.

- The New Adventures of Wonder Woman. In the 90 minute made-for-TV 1975 pilot movie, Lynda Carter as Wonder Woman fights Stella Stevens who plays the role of a Nazi spy. The previous year, an initial attempt to start a Wonder Woman TV series starring Cathy Lee Crosby failed when it did not garner sufficient TV ratings for ABC Television to renew as a series. The movie was criticized for featuring the blonde-haired Crosby in the role traditionally reserved for a brunette, a decision that even Crosby had questioned. Crosby did have two short fights, one of which was against a renegade Amazon played by Anitra Ford.
- The Old Chisholm Trail. Johnny Mack Brown and Tex Ritter are singing cowboys in this 1942 western that also stars Mady Correll as a scheming ranch owner and Jennifer Holt as the blonde heroine who own the local trading post where the two women get into a "vicious catfight".
- The San Francisco Docks. Actress Esther Ralston, described as a "hard fighting blonde glamor girl", told director Arthur Lubin that her and fellow actress Irene Hervey did not want to have stunt doubles perform their fight scene, described by press accounts as a "whirlwind fistfight ... said to overshadow the most hectic feminine movie battles seen in recent motion pictures." Hervey later described the fight as a "terrific battle between me and Esther Ralston—with hair-pulling, kicking, the works."
- The Spy in the Green Hat. In this theatrical version of the two-part The Man from U.N.C.L.E. episode titled "The Concrete Overcoat Affair", Leticia Roman tries to escape from the guard of Janet Leigh who responds by pulling a knife from her garter belt and attacking Roman. Knocking the knife out of Leigh's hand, the two women "roll around together on a conference table, and a good old-fashioned catfight ensues." One critic described it as "what may very well be one of the sexiest spy movie scenes ever, Janet Leigh versus Roman wrestling in skirts is the stuff dreams are made of." Advertisements showing the dark-haired Roman fighting the blonde Leigh were featured in many newspapers. One caption read "Guest stars Janet Leigh and Leticia Roman use cat-like tactics in this sparring scene from Friday night's 'Man From Uncle' telecast."
- The Three Musketeers. Near the end of the movie, Raquel Welch fights Faye Dunaway, a battle described by Dunaway as a fight "where we try, more or less, to tear each other to pieces. Welch and Dunaway worked with trainers to make their fight as "physical and brutal" as possible without injuring themselves, although Welch suffered a sprained wrist when Dunaway shoved her so hard she fell.
- The Turning Point. In the film's pivotal scene, the two adult female protagonists, portrayed by Anne Bancroft and Shirley MacLaine, have an extended catfight on the roof of Lincoln Center.
- The Women. After Paulette Goddard steals Rosalind Russell's husband, the two get into a kicking, hair-pulling fight that took three days and eight changes of costume to shoot. During the fight, Russell bit Goddard in the leg. Russell later said that Goddard suffered a permanent scar from the bite, but that the two actresses remained friends. A 1955 remake of the film was featured on the TV show Producers' Showcase. Goddard and Mary Boland were the only cast members from the original 1939 film. Allegedly, Goddard and Shelley Winters, a cast member of the remake, engaged in an actual "hair-pulling fist fight" during one of the rehearsals. Unlike the original, Metro-Goldwyn-Mayer's 1956 remake titled, The Opposite Sex, included men, music, color, and songs. During the rehearsal of the Russell-Goddard catfight from the original movie, Ann Miller punched co-star Delores Gray hard enough to knock her off her feet, twice. Later in the movie, June Allyson slapped Joan Collins so hard filming was postponed until Collin's facial swelling went down.

Blond heroine Jennifer Holt fights scheming rancher Mady Correll in the 1941 western The Old Chisholm Trail

- The Wrecking Crew. Nancy Kwan battles Sharon Tate in a karate scene choreographed by Bruce Lee. Released in 1968, this was one of Tate's last films before she was murdered by Charles Manson. "Tate looks stunning in her micro-minis and even has a catfight with Nancy Kwan's evil enemy agent."
- Total Recall. Directed by Paul Verhoeven and starring Arnold Schwarzenegger as Douglas Quaid, the 1990 film featured a "knock down, drag-out battle between Quaid's wife (Sharon Stone) and his dream girl Rachel Ticotin. One reviewer noted that it was "the best screen fight between two women since Destry Rides Again". In his autobiography, stunt coordinator and second unit director Vic Armstrong explained the discussion he had with Verhoeven about the fight scene between Stone and Ticotin, "This is one chance Paul where we can do a really good fight between women, where they actually land punches instead of pulling their hair and tearing their blouses and all that old nonsense." Verhoeven's "eyes lit up" and he agreed with Armstrong's scripting of the fight. A 2012 remake of the film featured Kate Beckinsale and Jessica Biel, in the roles previously filled by Stone and Ticotin.
- True Lies. Jamie Lee Curtis and Tia Carrere engage in a "precisely choreographed catfight" while in the back seat of an out of control limousine.
- Untamed Youth. Arguing over a bed in a prison camp dormitory, Lori Nelson fights Jeanne Carmen in the 1957 film about juvenile delinquency. The scene has been noted for unusual dialogue: before they fight, Nelson asks Carmen if she wants "an Italian hair cut", presumably referring to hair pulling. The fight begins with the dark-haired Carmen threatening to give Nelson a "beating", the two barefoot girls proceed to punch and wrestle each other until Carmen surrenders to her blonde opponent by telling her "Don't hit me in the mouth again, you'll break my dental plate."
- View from the Top. Flight attendants Gwyneth Paltrow and Christina Applegate fight each other in the cabin of a passenger airline.
- War Goddess. 1973 film, directed by Terence Young who had previously directed From Russia with Love that included the Beswick-Gur catfight scene. War Goddess featured an oil wrestling match between Sabine Sun and Alena Johnston, two amazons who were in competition to become the leader of their tribe.
- Woman They Almost Lynched. Saloon owner Audrey Totter has a "hair pulling fight ... and then one of those clear-the-streets gunfight" with challenger Joan Leslie.
- Yankee Pasha. Rhonda Fleming and Mamie Van Doren are both in love with Jeff Chandler leading to a "catfight for supremacy" where Fleming landed an actual punch on Van Doren's jaw, sending her sprawling across the set. Van Doren later said that Fleming was "quite a fighter". Despite the mishap in what was otherwise a carefully choreographed fight that involved a lot of "tumbling and hair pulling", Van Doren claimed that as a young actress, she enjoyed working with Fleming in the movie.

== Eroticism ==
Catfight is also the collective term for a fetish-like inclination, which has its erotic attraction in the competitive as well as the playful test of strength between women. This inclination is primarily voyeuristic and includes among other sports wrestling, arm wrestling and boxing.

The porn industry portrays intimate wrestling matches which sometimes lead to orgasmic entanglements and open tribadism. In some cases, sexual arousal and climax are the mutual goals of a female wrestling match. The main rule of such a "sex fight" is usually: Whoever has an orgasm first, loses. Nonetheless, multiple orgasms are possible. Therefore, tribadic scenes and erotic fights cannot always be distinguished. So-called sexfights, pussyfights or tribfights form separate categories among commercially produced videos.

From the 1990s to the mid-2000s, Napali Video and California Wildcats were groundbreaking for the production and publication of such videos in the Anglo-American region. Depending on the film, the depicted focus was on different types of duels, including wrestling, boxing, sexfighting or titfighting, the aggressive squeezing or rubbing of the breasts. However, clearly lesbian acts were almost always part of the scenes presented. Actresses for Napali Video and California Wildcats included Puma Swede, Vanessa Blue, Kim Chambers, Penny Flame and Jessica Jaymes. In particular, Tanya Danielle and Devon Michaels repeatedly appeared together in multiple videos, which gave the impression of an actual rivalry and both actresses became icons of the scene.

Eventually, the first European productions appeared around the same time. The Austrian production company Danube Women Wrestling (DWW), which had previously primarily specialized in erotic wrestling matches, also marketed sexfighting videos until 2011 under the "Tribgirls" label. The wrestlers were initially mainly of Hungarian and later Czech nationality. The production of videos was continued from 2012 on by Fighting-Dolls.com and Trib-Dolls.com from Brno, who followed in the footsteps of DWW and Tribgirls. However, some of the women switched to the Foxy Combat studio, which is operated by former DWW wrestler Hana Klima since 2007 and which has also been producing videos of erotic wrestling and sexfighting ever since. Foxy Combat is also based in Brno, which means that two competing production companies are based in the second largest city in the Czech Republic. Meanwhile, commercially produced videos of lesbian sexfights are no longer uncommon and come from the United States as well as Europe and East Asia.

== Gallery ==
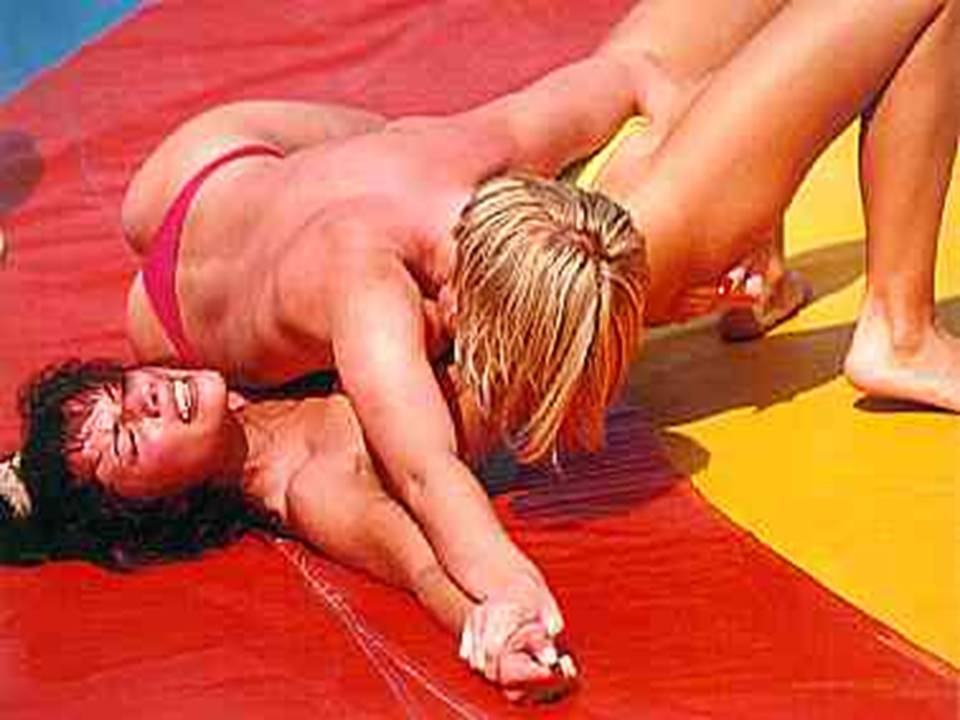
Two women in a competitive wrestling match

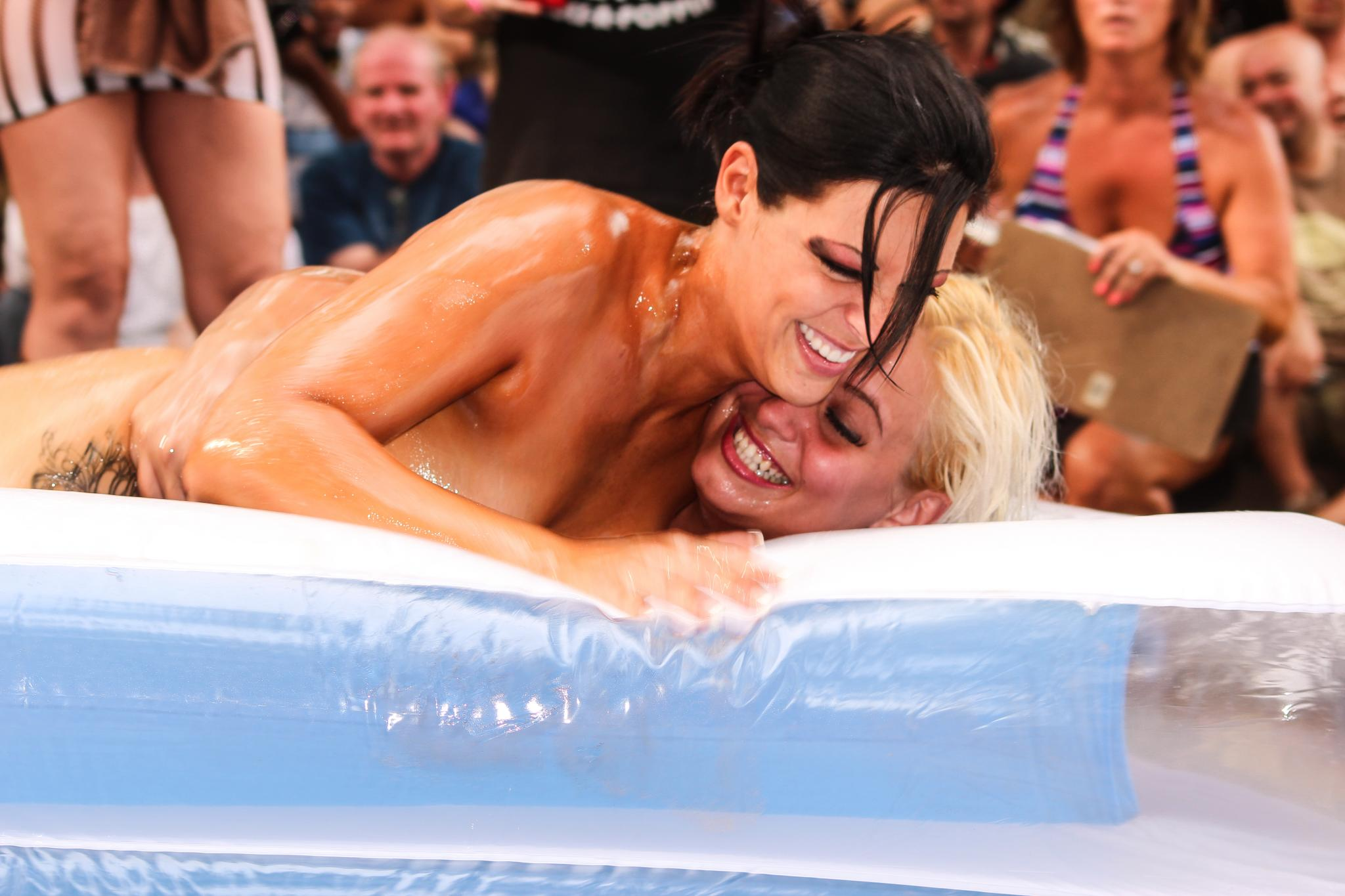
Nude oil wrestling at Nudes-A-Poppin', US

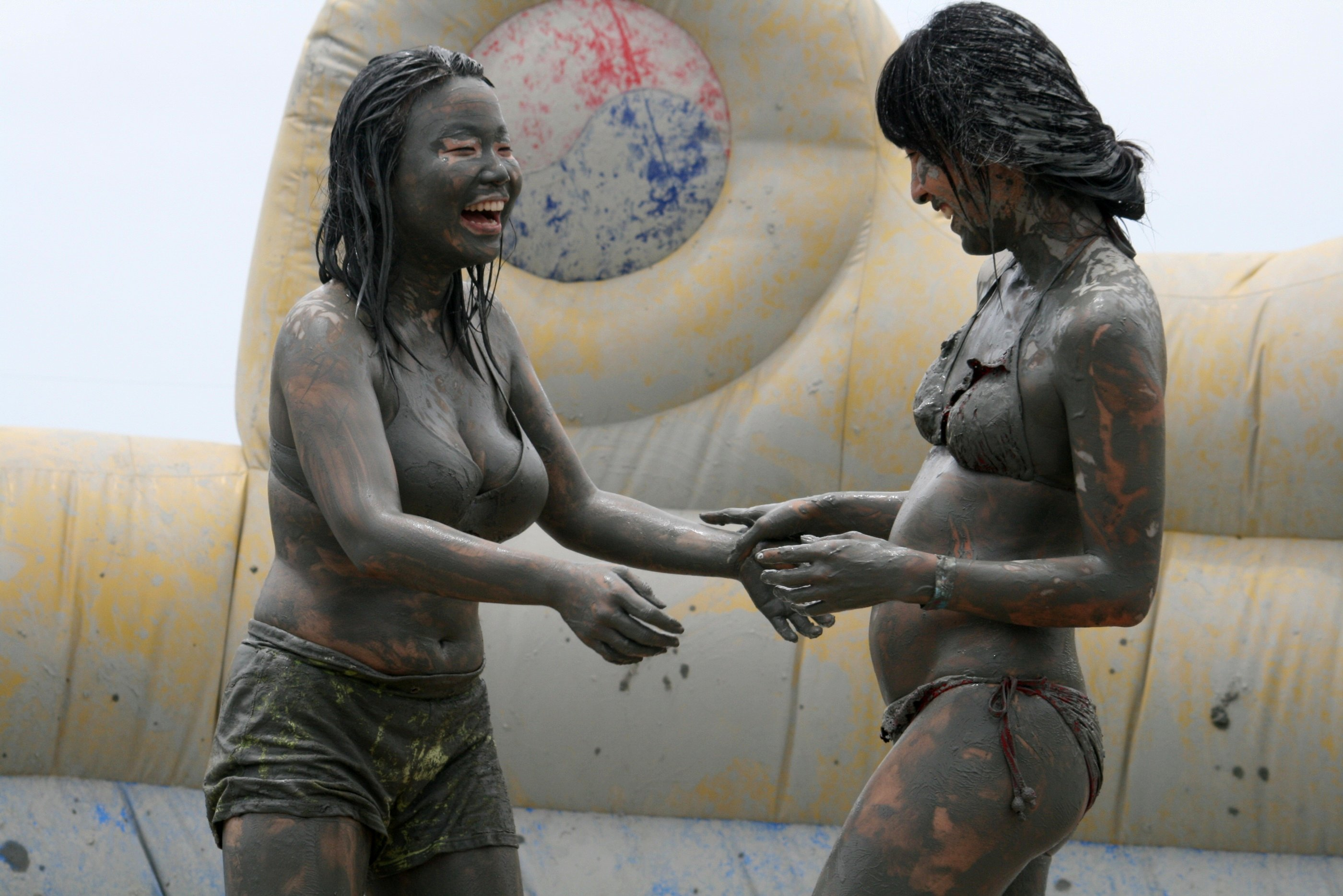
Mud wrestling in bikini at Boryeong Mud Festival, South Korea

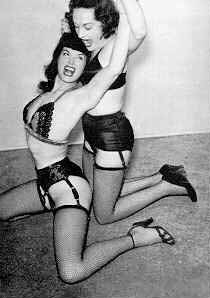
Circa 1950s, an Irving Klaw photograph of Bettie Page fighting another woman

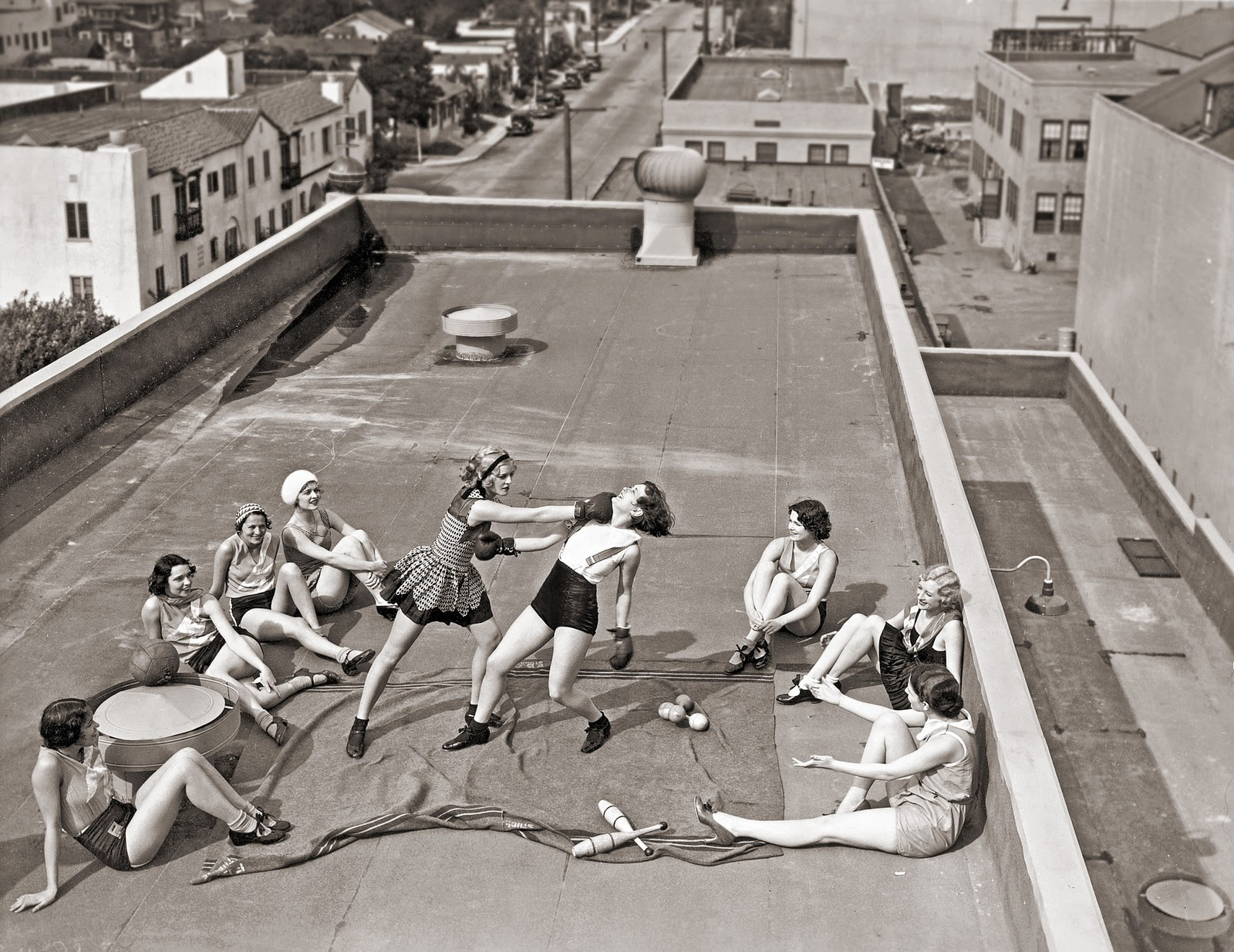
Women boxing on a rooftop in the 1930s

== See also ==
- Foxy boxing
- Intergender wrestling
- Les Gladiatrices: Blondes vs. Brunes
