= Channing Pollock (magician) =

American magician and actor

- Born: August 16, 1926; Cement, California, U.S.
- Died: March 18, 2006 (aged 79); Las Vegas, Nevada, U.S.
- Occupations: Magician, actor
- Years active: 1952–2006
- Spouses: Naomi Phelps (m. 1940s; div. 1959); Josephine Bolton (m. 1960; div. 1968); Corinne Shoong (m. 1969; died 2000); Joann Kozak (m. 2003)
- Children: Russell Pollock

Channing Pollock (August 16, 1926 – March 18, 2006) was an American magician and film actor. Renowned for his elegance and technical precision, he was recognized as one of the most sophisticated and charismatic practitioners of his craft. Pollock was best known for an act in which he elegantly produced doves out of the air, a routine that revolutionized 20th-century magic by replacing bulky props with pure manual dexterity. He was often billed as "the most beautiful man in the world." Pollock's early work as a magician was on the nightclub circuit.

By the mid-1950s, Pollock was unsurpassed in his field and inspired many imitators.

Pollock was skilled with sleight of hand and card manipulation. By molding doves from his hands, Pollock signature act took him around the world and later transitioned into a successful career in international cinema.

== Biography ==
=== Early life and military service ===
Born in Cement, California, Channing West Pollock was a shy youth who lacked self-confidence despite his tall stature. In high school, he began dating Naomi Phelps, the daughter of a minister. To establish a stable future for their marriage, Pollock joined the United States Navy during World War II. Following his service, he attended college, but his direction changed after visiting the California State Fair. There, he witnessed a demonstration of a Svengali deck, which sparked a fascination with magic that became his lifelong vocation.

=== Education and the "Lean Years" ===
Lacking the funds for professional equipment, Pollock taught himself the craft by studying library books, including Jean Hugard's Modern Magic Manual. Despite the financial strain, he moved his family to Hollywood to attend the Chavez School of Magic, graduating in 1952.

The early years of his career were defined by extreme hardship. Pollock and Naomi traveled across North America in a trailer, with Pollock performing a manipulation act learned at Chavez. Recognizing that general audiences found long card routines disengaging, he sought a "hook" to elevate his performance. Inspired by the Mexican magician Cantú, Pollock began developing a dove production act. During this period, he worked a grueling circuit of nightclubs and strip clubs to support his wife and son, Russell.

=== Breakthrough and Stardom ===
In a final attempt to achieve success, Pollock traveled to New York to seek representation from agent Mark Leddy. After initial rejections, Leddy witnessed Pollock's act in Philadelphia and recognized his potential. Pollock was booked for The Ed Sullivan Show. While he was "bumped" twice due to time constraints, the appearance fees allowed him to finally pay mechanic Connie Hayden to complete a custom vanishing cage prop. His eventual debut on the show was a critical success, establishing him as a premier international entertainer.

This led to better gigs touring with radio and television star Jack Benny. During the tour, they were not only featured with the comedian, but also performed alongside future legend Sammy Davis Jr. At the end of the tour, Leddy had a surprise for the Pollocks when they performed for President Dwight D. Eisenhower.

The magical year of 1954 ended with Channing Pollock being honored by the Academy of Magical Arts and Sciences which awarded him Magician of the Year. The Pollock's would need a crystal ball to foresee what was about to happen for them for the rest of the decade.

==== International stardom and European debut ====
In 1954, British impresario Lew Grade witnessed Pollock’s act in the United States and immediately arranged for his British debut at the prestigious Savoy Hotel in July 1955. Though they entered the stage without a formal introduction, the casual elegance of the dove production and vanishing cage, Pollock and Naomi were a triumph. Despite initial skepticism from London bookers, Channing became an overnight sensation.

Reviewing the performance, Variety noted that Pollock "without a spoken word, baffles the audience... equally adept at manipulating several decks of cards." The act's sophistication attracted elite patrons, including Vivien Leigh and Laurence Olivier, who requested to meet the magician backstage.

On July 18, 1955, Pollock made his debut at the London Palladium, headlining alongside Rosemary Clooney. In a symbolic passing of the torch, Pollock was offered the "Cardini Blues"—the specific blue velvet curtains designed for the legendary Cardini during his historic Palladium run. Pollock utilized these curtains throughout his engagement, finding his white doves contrasted perfectly against the deep blue hue.

The Palladium run transformed Pollock into a major celebrity, and he was frequently mobbed by fans at the theater's stage door. To manage his schedule, he employed his friend Frank Brooker as his private chauffeur as they performed at multiple venues nightly, including the Grosvenor House Hotel, The Dorchester, and the Pigalle. This period necessitated a long separation from his son, Russell, who remained in California under the care of Naomi’s parents in the Mojave Desert. Eventually the family was reunited when Russell was sent to England to share in their fame.

If this fairytale saga was not enough, the magical couple performed for such luminary figures as Queen Elizabeth II, and Prince Rainier and Grace Kelly at their royal wedding. The Pollocks were an international success, performing all throughout Europe. One of their many stops was in Paris, France. At the height of his career, Channing Pollock was one of America's highest-paid entertainers. Demonstrating his mastery, he even taught his act to his chauffeur in London, Frank Brooker, who performed the routine for several years under the stage name "Franklyn."

This fairytale ride would soon come crashing down. The grind of touring took a toll on their marriage. Channing’s personal life went into a tailspin. The transition continued after his 1959 divorce from Naomi. Pollock married his second wife, Josephine "Jozy" Bolton, in 1960. Jozy became his onstage partner, and they starred in the Las Vegas production of the Lido de Paris at the Stardust Hotel. During this era, they also toured extensively with Liberace, appearing on variety programs like The Hollywood Palace.

=== Actor ===
Seeking new challenges, he studied acting with British actress Hermione Gingold and transitioned into international film. In 1959, Pollock's act was featured in the film European Nights. The following year, he stepped away from his magic career to pursue acting in Europe. Based in Rome, he starred in several thrillers and dramas, including Musketeers of the Sea (1962), Lo sceicco rosso (1962), and Georges Franju's Judex (1963). He was famously touted as a potential successor to Rudolph Valentino.

Pollock eventually returned to the United States and appeared on several television shows, including The Great Adventure, The Rogues, and Daniel Boone. Not able to reproduce his film success he had in Europe, Channing Pollock retired from full-time performing in 1968, with his final major performance on the show Watch Closely, hosted by his friend Peter Pit. Which followed his last appearance as an actor, being featured on classic television Western, Bonanza (1971).

== Selected credits and accomplishments ==
=== Stage ===
Year	Venue	Production	Notes
1955	London Palladium	Variety Bill	Headlined multiple variety bills in the mid-1950s.
1956	London Hippodrome	Meet Me On The Corner	Co-starred with Max Bygraves.
1950s	Lido de Paris	French Revues	Featured performer in Paris spectaculars.
1958	Stardust Hotel	Lido de Paris	Inaugural Las Vegas production of the French revue.
1961	Latin Quarter	Headline Residency	Headlined major New York cabaret venue.

=== Film ===
Year	Title	Role	Notes
1959	European Nights	Himself	Definitive color recording of his dove act
1962	Musketeers of the Sea	Pierre de Savigny	Starring role
1962	Lo sceicco rosso	Ruiz da Silva	Also known as The Red Sheik
1963	Judex	Judex / Vallières	Lead role; touted as the "New Valentino"
1963	Rocambole	Roland de Chamery	Starring role

=== Television ===
Year	Title	Role	Notes
1954–1960	The Ed Sullivan Show	Himself (Magician)	Multiple guest appearances.
1956	The Max Wall Show	Himself	British variety appearance.
1964	The Great Adventure	Kit Carson	Episode: "The Great Adventure."
1964–1965	The Hollywood Palace	Himself (Magician)	Multiple appearances, including performing with Liberace.
1965	The Rogues	Luminon	Episode: "The Pigeons of St. Peters."
1966	Daniel Boone	Fletcher Cameron	Episode: "Seminole Territory" (S2, E17).
1967	The Mike Douglas Show	Himself	Appeared alongside Liberace.
1968	Watch Closely	Himself	Final full-length magic performance.
1971	Bonanza	Carter	Episode: "A Town Called Midnight."

=== Farming and mentoring ===
In 1971, Pollock and his third wife Cori, established an organic farm in San Gregorio, California. He became a devoted friend and mentor to aspiring magicians, most notably Lance Burton and James Dimmare, helping to shape the next generation of manipulators. He dedicated his time to spiritual study, specifically A Course in Miracles, which he credited with providing personal healing and a new perspective on his legacy.

=== Personal life ===
The pressures of international fame led to the breakdown of Pollock’s first marriage to Naomi in 1959. He was subsequently married to Josephine "Jozy" Bolton (1960–1968), who also served as his onstage partner. In 1969, he married Corinne Shoong, (also known as Cori) with whom he shared a long marriage until her death in 2000. In 2003, he married Joann Kozak, who survived him following his death from cancer in 2006. Joann died in 2019.

== Death and legacy ==
Pollock died in Las Vegas, Nevada, on March 18, 2006, at the age of 79, due to complications from cancer. He is remembered as a "magician's magician," having redefined the aesthetics of stage magic for the modern era.
