= The Phantom of the Card Table =

Book by Walter Irving Scott

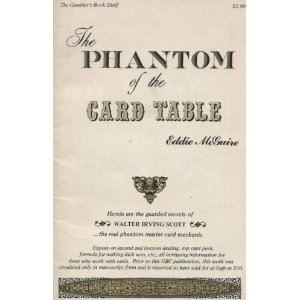
- Author: Eddie McGuire with Walter Irving Scott
- Language: English
- Subject: sleight of hand, cheating, scams, cons, hustling, cardsharps
- Genre: Instructive
- Publisher: Gambler's Book Club
- Publication date: 1931 (first edition), 1951, (second edition), 1976 (current edition)
- Publication place: United States
- Media type: Pamphlet
- Pages: 64
- ISBN: 0-911996-12-5

The Phantom of the Card Table is a manuscript published in 1931 by Eddie McGuire on the card skills and techniques of Walter Irving Scott aka 'The Phantom'.

== Contents ==
The manuscript was a collection of notes, letters and typed up explanations on the secrets of Scott's work from special techniques to cheating devices.

== History ==
For several years Eddie McGuire, an amateur magician had been in correspondence with some of the top names, notably Cardini in New York City. He spoke often of his association with an amazing card cheat, Walter Scott, and his unbelievable skills at the card table. In New York, on 14 June 1930, McGuire arranged a special presentation to the Inner Circle of the New York magic elite. Scott wowed his audience and became an overnight sensation. However he had no interest in pursuing a life among this community and was only pushed to perform by McGuire. The manuscript was used by McGuire to fulfil his own ambitions and his search for publicity. He wanted desperately to know the secrets of the highest professionals and used his presence as Scott's intermediary to ingratiate himself. For others, such as Dai Vernon, McGuire was a pest who constantly used his position to condescend and frustrate Vernon's efforts to meet Scott in person.

Scott claimed that McGuire had used him to get to the group in New York. The manuscript was another weapon in McGuire's arsenal and no more than three dozen copies were first published. They were sold for between $50 and $100 in 1931. Scott called it a mistake and "regretted it to this day".

Eventually, despite fervent attempts to maintain his status, the lack of appearances by Scott led McGuire to become redundant and in 1934 disappeared/retired from the magic community for unknown reasons.

The legend of Scott continued to grow however and Arthur T. Johnson, a magician from New York, produced an edition of The Phantom of the Card table in 1951 and handed it out anonymously at a magician's convention so that the material would not be in danger of being forgotten.

Johnson discovered McGuire to still be alive and with his co-operation the manuscript was run as a three-part series in The Linking Ring magazine, beginning with the November 1953 issue. Added was an introduction, a reprint of McGuire's 1932 article 'A Talk to Card Enthusiasts'. Originally printed in 'Seven Circles', a conjuring magazine, it was no more than a puff piece and a thinly veiled attack on Dai Vernon.

The series rekindled interest in Scott but yet again McGuire found himself the subject of ridicule.

In 1976, the publisher Gambler's Book Club reprinted the manuscript at 64 pages. McGuire is credited as the author.
