= Foxy boxing =

Form of sports entertainment

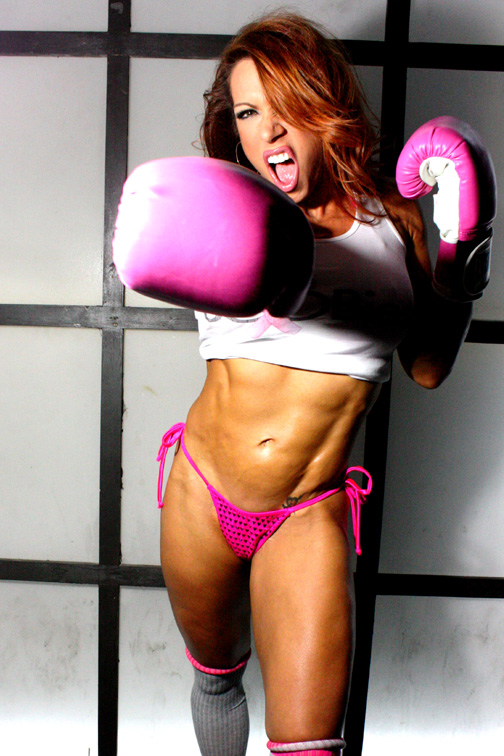
A foxy boxer — April Hunter

Foxy boxing is a form of sports entertainment which involves two or more women boxing (or pretending to do so) in a sexualized context as a form of erotic entertainment. The participants are typically dressed in revealing clothing such as bikinis or skintight leotards, while the actual fight usually focuses on the beauty of the combatants rather than fighting skills. Foxy boxing is unusual in that the audience generally does not care who wins. It is believed to have its roots in "singles' bars in southern California" after the interest in women's boxing began to decline in the late 1980s.

Showgirls boxing in heels at the Royal Palm club on Biscayne Bay, Miami, April 1937.

The mainstream competitive sport of women's boxing has tried to avoid association with foxy boxing. Foxy boxing was also utilized by bar owners in Thailand for the same type of audience.

It was a popular entertainment used in the Philippines for military men in the 1980s and 1990s. It included both boxing and wrestling and the women were expected to "draw blood and show bruises before they got paid". Foxy boxing was also utilized by bar owners in Thailand for the same type of audience.

The style of fighting was formed into a new genre by David Borden, into what came to be known as Kaiju Big Battel, which was staged fights with a heavy tokusatsu and pop culture influence.

Although foxy boxing is more of an entertainment spectacle than a sport, it has resulted in injuries. A foxy boxer at a high-end strip club in Rhode Island sued her employer after her silicone breast implants were ruptured in a fight. The class action suit ruled her employer liable.

== Media and popular culture ==
The sport is frequently referenced in popular culture:

- Homer Simpson on The Simpsons mentioned it three times: In the season one episode "Homer's Night Out", "Foxy Boxing" is one of the places where Homer and Bart stop at in their quest for Princess Kashmir. On the season six episode "Lisa on Ice", he tells Lisa that "if the Bible has taught us nothing else—‌and it hasn't—‌it's that girls should stick to girl sports, such as hot-oil wrestling, foxy boxing, and such and such." Later, on the season 12 episode "Tennis the Menace", Homer builds a tennis court, only to learn that tennis is not the same as foxy boxing (or as he calls it, "the sport where the chicks whale on each other").
- The King of the Hill episode "Boxing Luanne" centered on Luanne Platter thinking she has taken up mainstream women's boxing, only to find she has been underwritten by Buck Strickland for foxy boxing.
- Miami Vice season one episode 9 "Glades" contains a scene of two women foxy boxing approximately 9 minutes into the episode. The owner of the club promoting the event even refers directly to the sport stating, "Foxy Boxing is what's in now".
- In the final episode of the TV Series Freaks and Geeks (Discos & Dragons, Season 1, Ep. 18), Seth Rogen's character Ken is thrown out of a disco club for causing a scene and making fun of disco music. As he's being escorted from the building, the bouncer at the disco club tells him not to worry too much because the disco will be shut down the following week in favor of foxy boxing.
- On the March 17, 2010 episode of The Daily Show, Jon Stewart compares the U.S. congressional debate over health care reform to foxy boxing.
- In the Family Guy episode "Baby, You Knock Me Out", Lois Griffin starts her "boxing career" as a foxy boxer.
- In Season 2, Episode 5 of 30 Rock, Kenneth throws a party rumored to have foxy boxing.
- In How I Met Your Mother, Barney Stinson is a fan of foxy boxing.
- In Season 2, Episode 6 of Happy!, one of the main antagonists states that hockey seems like foxy boxing compared to calcio storico.

== See also ==
- Bikini Basketball Association
- Catfight
- Legends Football League
- Muscle worship
- Mud wrestling
