= Gazzo =

Gazzo may refer to:

== Places ==
Italy

- Gazzo, Veneto, a town in the Province of Padua, Veneto
- Gazzo Veronese, a town in the Province of Verona, Veneto
- Gazzo di Bigarello, a village in the Province of Mantua, Lombardy
- Monte Gazzo, a hill near the town of Sestri Ponente, Liguria

== People ==
- Gazzo (magician) (born 1960), British street magician
- Gazzo (producer) (born 1990), American DJ and producer
- Jane Gazzo (born 1977), Australian broadcaster
- Michael V. Gazzo (1923–1995), American actor and Broadway playwright
