= Midnight Madonna =

1937 film by James Flood

- Theatrical release poster
- Directed by: James Flood
- Screenplay by: David Boehm; Gladys Lehman; Doris Malloy
- Produced by: Emanuel Cohen
- Starring: Warren William; Mady Correll; Kitty Clancy; Edward Ellis; Jonathan Hale
- Cinematography: Robert Pittack
- Edited by: Ray Curtiss
- Production company: Paramount Pictures
- Distributed by: Paramount Pictures
- Release date: July 2, 1937
- Running time: 56 minutes
- Country: United States
- Language: English

Midnight Madonna is a 1937 American drama film directed by James Flood and written by David Boehm, Gladys Lehman and Doris Malloy. The film stars Warren William, Edward Ellis, Jonathan Hale, Mady Correll, and Kitty Clancy. The film was released on July 2, 1937, by Paramount Pictures.

== Plot ==
Gambler Blackie Denbo helps Kay Barrie as her daughter inherits a fortune and is taken away by her estranged father.

== Cast ==
- Warren William as Blackie Denbo
- Mady Correll as Kay Barrie
- Kitty Clancy as Penny Long
- Edward Ellis as Judge Clark
- Robert Baldwin as Vinny Long
- Jonathan Hale as Stuart Kirkland
- Joe Sawyer as Wolfe
- Joseph Crehan as Moe Grinnell
- Irene Franklin as Cafe Proprietor
- Nick Copeland as Ed Kerrigan
- Frank Reicher as Vincent Long II
- May Wallace as Mrs. Withers
- Buddy Messinger as Messenger

== Critical reception ==
In discussing his choices for the best film releases of July, 1937, Frank S. Nugent of the The New York Times wrote, "But July's real boon, I'll skip the others, was the appearance of 'ittle Kitty Clancy, Paramount's answer to Twentieth Century-Fox's Shirley Temple. 'Ittle Kitty arrived in a picture called "Midnight Madonna" and I have every hope that she will go far and stay there."

Variety wrote that the film "is purely designed as a debut for four-year-young [sic] Kitty Clancy, moppet under new Paramount contract. Vehicle achieved its purpose on behalf of the youngster, but nothing more." The reviewer considered that with her "elfin cuteness [and] trouping ability", Clancy may be a successor to Shirley Temple as Temple was "growing up from the wee tot age." It determined that the family audiences would find the film entertaining.
