= Texas Masquerade =

1944 film by George Archainbaud

- Theatrical release poster
- Directed by: George Archainbaud
- Screenplay by: Jack Lait Jr. Norman Houston
- Produced by: Harry Sherman
- Starring: William Boyd; Andy Clyde; Jimmy Rogers; Don Costello; Mady Correll; Francis McDonald
- Cinematography: Russell Harlan
- Edited by: Walter Hannemann
- Music by: Irvin Talbot
- Production company: Harry Sherman Productions
- Distributed by: United Artists
- Release date: February 8, 1944
- Running time: 58 minutes
- Country: United States
- Language: English

Texas Masquerade is a 1944 American Western film directed by George Archainbaud, written by Jack Lait Jr. and Norman Houston, and starring William Boyd, Andy Clyde, Jimmy Rogers, Don Costello, Mady Correll and Francis McDonald. It was released on February 8, 1944, by United Artists.

== Plot ==
Ace Maxson (Don Costello) and J. K. Trimble (Russell Simpson) are using night riders to scare ranchers off their land, for they know oil is under ground. Hoppy finds wounded lawyer James Corwin, (Nelson Leigh) and assumes his identify, but outlaw Sam Nolan (Francis McDonald) recognizes Hoppy.

== Cast ==
- William Boyd as Hopalong Cassidy
- Andy Clyde as California Carlson
- Jimmy Rogers as Jimmy Rogers
- Don Costello as Ace Maxson
- Mady Correll as Virginia Curtis
- Francis McDonald as Sam Nolan
- Russell Simpson as J.K. Trimble
- J. Farrell MacDonald as John Martindale
- Nelson Leigh as James Corwin
- Robert McKenzie as Marshal Rowbottom
- Pierce Lyden as Henchman Al
- June Pickerell as Mrs. Emma Martindale
- Bill Hunter as Deputy Lou Sykes
- John Merton as Henchman Jeff
