= Hôtel des Invalides (film) =

1951 film

- Directed by: Georges Franju
- Written by: Georges Franju
- Produced by: Paul Legros
- Narrated by: Michel Simon
- Cinematography: Marcel Fradetal
- Release date: 1952
- Running time: 22 minutes
- Country: France
- Language: French

Hôtel des Invalides is a 1952 French short documentary film directed by Georges Franju.

== Cast ==
- Michel Simon as Récitant / Narrator (voice)
