= The Old Chisholm Trail (film) =

1942 film by Elmer Clifton

- Theatrical release poster
- Directed by: Elmer Clifton
- Screenplay by: Elmer Clifton
- Story by: Harry L. Fraser
- Produced by: Oliver Drake
- Starring: Johnny Mack Brown; Tex Ritter; Fuzzy Knight; Jennifer Holt; Mady Correll; Earle Hodgins
- Cinematography: William A. Sickner
- Edited by: Ray Snyder
- Production company: Universal Pictures
- Distributed by: Universal Pictures
- Release date: December 11, 1942
- Running time: 61 minutes
- Country: United States
- Language: English

The Old Chisholm Trail is a 1942 American Western film written and directed by Elmer Clifton. The film stars Johnny Mack Brown, Tex Ritter, Fuzzy Knight, Jennifer Holt, Mady Correll and Earle Hodgins. The film was released on December 11, 1942, by Universal Pictures.

== Plot ==
Ranch owner Belle Turner (Mady Correll) owns one of the few properties along the Old Chisolm Trail that has badly needed water for cattlemen driving their herds to Abilene, but charges exorbitant fees in return. Not willing to pay Belle five dollars a head of steer for water, Dusty Gardner (Johnny Mack Brown) and his fellow cattlemen detour his herd to Lost River, where he meets Mary Lee (Jennifer Holt), the blond proprietor of the local trading post, and gambler Montana Smith (Tex Ritter). Since the river mysteriously ran dry, Mary has to ship water in to keep her business alive. Realizing that Belle has illegally diverted the water from the river, Dusty goes into the town of Gunsight to get an injunction against Belle but the town sheriff offers little help and instead recommends that Dusty and Belle meet at Mary's trading post to work out their differences. During the meeting Belle's men stampede Dusty's unattended herd onto her land and she informs Dusty that she's holding the herd hostage until he pays her the fees she originally demanded. Furious at her maneuvering, Mary confronts Belle and the two women fight each other. Belle storms out of the trading post with her men having lost the fight with Mary. Subsequently, Dusty and the other cattlemen decide to leave their herds on Belle's ranch to "fatten up," while they pursue an attempt to drill for their own water supply. Belle learns of their plans and has her men sabotage the drilling equipment. Realizing the nature of Belle's ways, Montana double-crosses Belle and helps Dusty buy new equipment. Belle, seeking revenge against Mary, sends her men to attack the trading post. During the ensuing battle, one of Dusty's men drops a bundle of dynamite down the well and strikes water. Belle and her gang are then captured, and Montana rides off, leaving Dusty and Mary together. During the movie, Montana sings several songs with Mary and his men, including Fuzzy Knight in the role of Alvin.

== Cast ==
- Johnny Mack Brown as Dusty Gardner
- Tex Ritter as Montana Smith
- Fuzzy Knight as Alvin Pendergast
- Jennifer Holt as Mary Lee
- Mady Correll as Belle Turner
- Earle Hodgins as Chief Hopping Crow
- Roy Barcroft as Ed Phillips
- Edmund Cobb as Joe Rankin
- Budd Buster as Hank

== Production ==
'The Old Chisholm Trail' was the third in a series of three Universal films starring Johnny Mack Brown and Tex Ritter, following Deep in the Heart of Texas and Little Joe, the Wrangler. All three films were released by Universal in 1942 and also starred Jennifer Holt, Fuzzy Knight and the Jimmy Wakely Trio. The Old Chisholm Trail was the only one of the three movies where Tex Ritter sang two songs.

"The highlight of the film" wrote one reviewer, "was the catfight between the villain and the blond proprietor of the local saloon."
