= A Girl, a Guy and a Gob =

1941 film by Richard Wallace

- Theatrical release poster
- Directed by: Richard Wallace
- Written by: Grover Jones
- Screenplay by: Frank Ryan; Bert Granet; Sarah Y. Mason; Victor Heerman
- Story by: Grover Jones
- Produced by: Harold Lloyd
- Starring: George Murphy; Lucille Ball; Edmond O'Brien
- Cinematography: Russell Metty
- Edited by: George Crone
- Music by: Roy Webb
- Production company: RKO Radio Pictures
- Distributed by: RKO Radio Pictures
- Release dates: March 4, 1941 (Honolulu); March 22, 1941 (Los Angeles); April 23, 1941 (New York City)
- Running time: 90 minutes
- Country: United States
- Language: English
- Budget: $412,000
- Box office: $848,000

A Girl, a Guy and a Gob is a 1941 RKO Pictures American comedy film produced by Harold Lloyd, directed by Richard Wallace and starring George Murphy, Lucille Ball and Edmond O'Brien.

== Plot ==
Mild-mannered shipping magnate Stephen Herrick meets his new secretary, Dot Duncan. Recognizing Dot from a calamitous encounter the previous evening, he dismisses her, but after she explains the situation, Stephen relents.

Dot's beau, wrestler Claudius J. "Coffee Cup" Cup, returns from the Navy. An incident on the street ends in a brawl in which Stephen is knocked unconscious, Coffee Cup takes him to the Duncan house to recover. Stephen awakens to the chaos of the Duncan household and is so delighted by Dot's boisterous family and friends that he accompanies her and Coffee Cup to a dance hall but forgets about his date with his fiancée, the snobbish Cecilia Grange. The next morning, Cecilia is infuriated and bursts into Stephen's office to find Dot, who has just fallen from a stepstool, in Stephen's arms. Cecilia's demands that he fire Dot, but Stephen ignores her.

Coffee Cup wins a wrestling match and wants to use his winnings to fund his wedding to Dot. However, Dot's brother Pigeon admits to betting on Coffee Cup's opponent and losing all of their money. Coffee Cup wins a piano at a raffle and plans to pawn it for an engagement ring, but the piano is destroyed by a truck. Coffee Cup's next plan lands him in jail for inciting a riot. Stephen posts his bail and offers to buy his good-luck ring so that Coffee Cup to afford Dot's engagement ring.

Stephen's partner Abel Martin encourages him to pursue Dot. However, Stephen concedes Dot to Coffee Cup, who asks him to be his best man at the wedding. During the wedding rehearsal, Coffee Cup misplaces the ring, and when he leaves the room to search for it, his sailor friends suggest that Dot is marrying the wrong groom. When Dot bursts into tears as Stephen approaches to kiss her good luck, Coffee Cup realizes that his friends were right and sends Stephen to speak to Dot. Coffee Cup flees the chapel on his motorcycle and Stephen pursues him in a cab. The men fight over Dot before the cab speeds them back to the chapel, where Coffee Cup deposits the unconscious Stephen along with a note to Dot explaining that he is reenlisting in the Navy and that Stephen is in love with her.

== Cast ==
- George Murphy as Claudius J. "Coffee Cup" Cup
- Lucille Ball as Dorothy "Dot" / "Spindle" Duncan
- Edmond O'Brien as Stephen Herrick
- Henry Travers as Abel Martin
- Franklin Pangborn as Pet Shop Owner
- George Cleveland as Pokey "Pop" Duncan
- Kathleen Howard as Jawme Duncan
- Marguerite Chapman as Cecilia Grange
- Lloyd Corrigan as Pigeon Duncan
- Mady Correll as Cora
- Frank McGlynn, Sr. as "Panky" Pankington
- Doodles Weaver as Eddie
- Frank Sully as Salty
- Nella Walker as Mrs. Grange
- Richard Lane as Recruiting Officer
- Irving Bacon as Mr. Albert Merney
- Rube Demarest as Ivory
- Charles Smith as Messenger
- Nora Cecil as Chairwoman
- Robert McKenzie as Janitor
- Earle Hodgins as Sylvester P. Wurple
- Steve Pendleton as Mr. Adams
- George Chandler as Guy Making Bet
- Carol Hughes as Dance Hall Girl

== Release ==
The world premiere of A Girl, a Guy and a Gob was held at the Hawaii Theatre in Honolulu, Hawaii on March 4, 1941.

== Reception ==
In a contemporary review for The New York Times, critic Theodore Strauss called A Girl, a Guy and a Gob "a rib-ticklish little comedy" and wrote: "Maybe the film is a trifle overlong, but most of it is extremely funny. It is full of irrelevant notions. Practically anything can happen—and does. ... The cast is giddy as can be. ... All of them seemed to enjoy their foolish frolic. So did we."

John L. Scott of the Los Angeles Times wrote: "[I]t's full of laughs. The producer's touch is so apparent throughout the story that one expects him to appear at any moment. ... All the concomitants of the Lloyd sure-fire formula for good, clean humor are utilized, including the chase of motorcycle and taxicab." According to RKO records, the film returned a profit of $49,000.

== See also ==
- List of American films of 1941
