= Judex (1963 film) =

- French film poster
- Directed by: Georges Franju
- Screenplay by: Jacques Champreux; Francis Lacassin
- Based on: Judex by: Arthur Bernède; Louis Feuillade
- Produced by: Robert de Nesle
- Starring: Channing Pollock; Francine Bergé; Édith Scob; Théo Sarapo; Sylva Koscina; René Génin; Roger Fradet; André Méliès; Philippe Mareuil; Luigi Cortese; Benjamin Boda; Jacques Jouanneau; Michel Vitold
- Cinematography: Marcel Fradetal
- Edited by: Gilbert Natot
- Music by: Maurice Jarre
- Production companies: Comptoir Francais du Film Production; Filmes Cinematografica
- Distributed by: Comptoir Français du Film
- Release dates: 4 December 1963 (France); 8 July 1964 (Italy)
- Running time: 103 minutes
- Countries: France; Italy
- Language: French

Judex is a 1963 French-language neo-noir crime film remake of the 1916 French serial film of the same name concerning the adventures of pulp hero Judex. Directed by French filmmaker Georges Franju, the film stars Channing Pollock as Judex/Vallieres, Édith Scob as Jacqueline and Francine Bergé as Diana.

== Plot ==
Banker Favraux has attained vast wealth through swindles and blackmail. In his mansion, Favraux receives a threatening note signed only "Judex", that demands he return swindled money to the victims.

Concerned with his safety, Favraux hires private detective Cocantin to keep a lookout at a party where he plans to announce the engagement of his widowed daughter, Jacqueline, who has a small daughter, Alice. Unknown to the family, Alice's governess Marie Verdier is actually Diana Monti, a cat burglar and cutthroat. Favraux is infatuated with Diana, but she refuses to be his mistress and demands that they marry. He agrees to marry her and will make the announcement at Jacquline's engagement party. Diana actually has no love for Favraux and plans to murder him after the wedding to obtain his vast fortune.

With the help of his own assistants, Judex is also watching over Jacqueline. At the engagement party, where everyone is masked, a mysterious guest, wearing a bird's head entertains the attendees with magic tricks. Later, it is revealed that the magician is actually Judex, keeping a close watch over Jacqueline. At the end of the party, Favraux appears to die of a heart attack as he begins to announce his engagement to Diana.

At Favraux's funeral, Jacqueline becomes aware of the letter from Judex. Knowing that her father built his fortune through illegal means, she renounces any money that she would inherit except for a portion to support Alice.

That night, Judex removes Favraux, who is alive and was only drugged, from his coffin. Judex imprisons Favraux in an abandoned castle. Diana, thwarted in her attempts to obtain Favraux's fortune through marriage, makes several attempts to kidnap Jacqueline, but is foiled by Judex. Diana also tries to abduct Alice, but is again foiled, partly through actions of detective Cocantin. Although alive, Favraux is despondent over seemingly losing Diana, and commits suicide.

Judex eventually battles Diana's accomplices while Diana flees to a building's rooftop. Daisy, a circus acrobat and friend of Cocantin, agrees to help them apprehend Diana and scales the outside of the building, confronting Diana on the rooftop. The two women fight each other with Diana (in black) battling Daisy (in white) and the fight ends in Diana's death.

Judex and Jacqueline are later reunited. They walk on a beach as a title appears: "In homage to Louis Feuillade, in memory of a time that was not happy: 1914".

== Cast ==
- Channing Pollock as Judex/Vallieres
- Édith Scob as Jacqueline Favraux
- Francine Bergé as Diana Monti
- Michel Vitold as Favraux, the Banker
- Théo Sarapo as Morales
- Sylva Koscina as Daisy
- Jacques Jouanneau as Detective Cocantin
- René Génin as Pierre Kerjean
- Benjamin Boda as Réglisse, the Boy
- Philippe Mareuil as Amaury de la Rochefontaine
- André Méliès as The Doctor
- Luigi Cortese as Pierrot
- Roger Fradet as Léon

== Production ==
=== Development ===
The production of Judex happened by chance. French writer Francis Lacassin was writing an article on French film, and while doing research he was approached by a production manager with an idea for a film, when he suggested to do a film on Judex. The story came to Jacques Champreux (grandson of the original creator of Judex, Louis Feuillade) and long-time admirer of director Georges Franju. Champreux asked the latter to make the film and he accepted despite having a stronger desire to remake Fantômas. Franju was not interested in the character or original story of Judex, stating that "Judex is the only film of Louis Feuillade that isn't good Louis Feuillade", but he wanted to recreate the film in the style of early French cinema that he remembered from his childhood. Champreux's idea for the film was to combine Franju's film style with the elements of the story in the original Judex and started writing the screenplay with that in mind. Champreux and Franju had the film open with a costume ball where everyone is wearing animal masks. This scene is influenced by French cartoonist J.J. Grandville, who depicted people with the heads of animals and birds.

=== Casting ===
Channing Pollock, who was a famous magician in cabaret circles, was cast as Judex. Pollock had been in several films beforehand and the backing producers wanted to make him into a Rudolph Valentino-type star. Franju and Champreux made his character into more of a magical character rather than a "dispenser of justice". Many actresses were thought of for the role of Diana Monti, originally played by Musidora in the Feuillade's Judex. Franju and Champreaux wanted someone who would "still look good even in the dark" and originally desired to have Brigitte Bardot as Diana Monti which excited their producers. After seeing Les Abysses at the Cannes Film Festival, they chose Francine Bergé who also played the role of Michele in the film. Franju settled on Bergé after seeing the young actress in Les Abysses. According to Bergé, he said simply, "I want the tall brunette who seems so evil". For much of the film, Franju dressed Bergé in a black leotard for her cat burglar sequences.

Franju cast Édith Scob as Jacqueline who he had worked with on his previous films, including Eyes Without a Face and Thérèse Desqueyroux.

== Release and reception ==
Judex was released on December 4, 1963, in France. The general reception for the French critics of Judex was fairly positive, with most critics applauding the homage to the original silent film serial while noting the problems that arose when with the over-conscientious approach to style and atmosphere. A critic from L'Express wrote that the film was "pure entertainment, pure charm, a total success", while another from Les Nouvelles littéraires called the film's pacing "lazy" and the film direction "nonchalant, not to say laborious". Claude Mauriac of Le Figaro Magazine wrote that the film did not let the audience relate to the action as it was too caught up attracting them to the "plastic beauty" of the film. The film opened up to generally positive review in the United States as well. Variety wrote a positive review stating that the film was "...a successful homage to the French film serials of the early, silent days...[the film] does not send up this form of pic but rather captures its essential simplicity, adventurousness and innocence". Time also wrote a positive review stating that "Judex has too much low-key charm and seriousness to be wildly funny, but director Franju seems content to woo a minority taste". The New York Times wrote a negative review, stating that Judex "suffers from several afflictions, one of which is ambiguity. It is hard to tell whether Georges Franju, who made it, wants us to laugh at it or take it seriously".

=== Retrospectives ===
Modern reception has been generally positive. Jonathan Rosenbaum of the Chicago Reader wrote that Judex was "one of the better features of [Franju's] middle period". Time Out wrote that the film is "superbly elegant" and an "enjoyable tribute to the adventure fantasies of Louis Feuillade".

Contemporary reviewers have noted the lack of screen time for Judex, the film's titular figure. His character also comes into question: while he acts as the self-appointed judge, trying to bring justice to those who have been swindled, his initial plan to murder Favraux for stealing other people's money strongly suggests a violent vigilante inclination. Judex's only true talents appear to be a handsome appearance and assorted magic tricks. Even his attempt to subdue Diana ultimately fails as he is taken hostage by one of her henchmen, leaving the task of taking down the female villain to another woman.

Franju's most directed dispensing of juvenilia comes in his treatment of Judex, whose screen time is considerably lesser than either Jacqueline or Diana. Even during the denouement, it's not Judex that battles Diana, but Daisy, whose good-versus-evil fisticuffs are literalized by their diverging black-and-white attire, though Franju suitably plays the confrontation muted—nearly silent—with only ambient noises and faint strings accompanying the fight. Franju repeatedly shirks any such reveling in violent confrontation, refusing to aestheticize revenge-as-pleasure. Franju, then, stands in contrast to Judex, whose proclivity for torturous lairs, odd technologies, obfuscating theatrics, and anonymous henchmen aligns his preoccupations more with the young boy (Benjamin Boda), whose fascinations and mimetic interests while accompanying Cocantin suggest innocence, but also impotence from adult life. Judex, whose only charms appear to be literal magic tricks and a strong jawline, is a child's eroticized fantasy of masculinity, posturing behind a disguise rather than cultivating a discernible, singular self. The boy, however, is capable of grief, as he mournfully stands over Diana's body, following her tangle with Daisy. Judex is afforded no such display of emotion, since his pleasures derive not from empathy, but self-aggrandizement—much like Favraux, ironically imprisoned for crimes that Judex, on a similarly ideological level, is likewise guilty.

In the film's climatic fight scene, brunette Diana and blonde Daisy's, "good-versus-evil fisticuffs are literalized by their diverging black-and-white attire". Other reviewers have noted the eroticism of the fight, as the women's legs tangle with each other.

Other themes in contemporary reviews center on the film's black vs white allegorical contrasts, sensuality, and fetishisms. Diana spends much of her time moving cat-like in form-fitting black leotards, with a silver dagger attached to her thigh. In the closing minutes of the film, the dark haired villainess is defeated in a lengthy, Manichaean life-and-death struggle on a roof top; not by Judex, but by the blonde circus acrobat, Daisy. Emphasizing the sexuality of the fight and highlighting Franchu's dark vs light, good vs evil theme that runs throughout the film, Daisy, like Diana, is also attired in a form fitting outfit but, in her case it is a skintight, white circus costume. If witnessing the woman vs woman fight-to-the-finish was not sufficiently enticing to the audience, Franju takes the opportunity to lower the camera and offer "...a gleefully sexy and exciting shot showing only their legs, clad in leotards of contrasting black and white, entwining and tangling in the dance of combat". Similarly, another contemporary reviewer noted that the camera angle provided an "erotic-charged shot" where Diana's legs in black tights and Daisy's legs in a white acrobatic costume, intertwine.

While Franju attempted to stay close to the original Judex, the rooftop fight between Diana and Daisy, a stylized battle between good (blond and dressed in white) and evil (brunette, dressed in black), fought in near-silence, is not found in the original Judex serial.

== Home media ==
A Region 2 release of Judex was released on August 25, 2008, by Eureka in their Masters of Cinema series. This release also included the 1973 film Nuits Rouges also directed by Georges Franju.

== Bibliography ==
- Ince, Kate. Georges Franju. Manchester University Press, 2005. ISBN 0-7190-6828-2.
