= Nuits Rouges =

- Directed by: Georges Franju
- Screenplay by: Jacques Champreaux
- Produced by: Raymond Froment
- Starring: Gayle Hunnicutt; Jacques Champreux; Gert Froebe; Joséphine Chaplin; Ugo Pagliai
- Cinematography: Guido Renzo Bertoni
- Edited by: Gilbert Natot
- Music by: Georges Franju
- Production companies: Terra Film; S.O.A.T.
- Distributed by: Planfilm
- Release date: November 20, 1974 (France)
- Running time: 105 minutes
- Countries: France; Italy
- Language: French

Nuits Rouges (lit. Red Nights, in French) is a 1974 French-Italian crime thriller film directed by Georges Franju. The film was released in the U.S. in an English-dubbed version by New Line Cinema under the title Shadowman in 1975. It is an adaptation of a 1973 French-Italian-Yugoslav TV mini-series titled "L'Homme sans visage" (The Man Without a Face).

== Premise ==
Paul de Borrego is a scholar whose field of research is the history of Templars. His discoveries are used by a criminal organisation led by the mysterious Faceless Man to help the latter expand his army of killers composed of people with dead brains.

== Cast ==
- Gayle Hunnicutt as the woman
- Jacques Champreux as the Faceless Man
- Josephine Chaplin as Martine Leduc
- Ugo Pagliai as Paul de Borrego
- Gert Froebe as Police commissioner Sorbier

== Production ==
Nuits Rouges was filmed in 1973. The film is a 100-minute theatrical version of a film originally commissioned for television. The budget for the film was so modest that Franju had to film all interiors of the film on a studio set.

Jacques Champreux (Louis Feuillade's grandson) who plays one the lead roles, had directed the series that inspired the film. He also had worked on Franju's Judex, which was also based on a film series.

Nuits Rouges is Franju's last feature film.

== Release ==
Nuits Rouges was released on November 20, 1974, in France.

== Reception ==
Nuits Rouges received mixed and even mocking reviews from French critics on its release. Nuits Rouges was released on DVD in the United Kingdom as part of Eureka's Masters of Cinema series along with another film by Georges Franju, Judex (1963) in 2008.

== Notes ==
=== References ===
- Ince, Kate (2005). Georges Franju. Manchester University Press. ISBN 0-7190-6828-2.
