= Gazzo (magician) =

British street magician, author, and lecturer (born 1960)

Gary "Gazzo" Osbourne
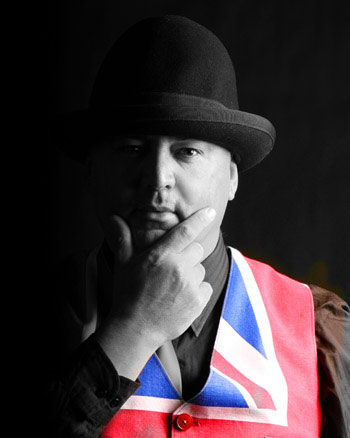
- Gazzo performing the cups and balls in Key West, Florida
- Born: March 23, 1960 (age 65); United Kingdom
- Occupations: Street magician, lecturer, author
- Years active: 1980s–present
- Known for: Street magic; comedy magic; cups and balls
- Notable work: Phantoms at the Card Table (2002); Phantoms at the Card Table: Confessions of a Card Sharp (2004)
- Website: Official website (archived)

Gary "Gazzo" Osbourne (born 1960) is a British street magician. Osbourne moved to the United States in the 1980s, where he befriended Walter Irving Scott, also known as The Phantom. He was entrusted with Scott's biography and life's work at card cheating and sleights.

== Health and recovery ==
Gazzo suffered a stroke on 21 March 2023 while performing at Mallory Square in Key West, Florida, two days before his 63rd birthday.

=== Lectures ===
At the 2025 FISM World Championship of Magic in Turin, Italy, Gazzo was billed to perform street magic, deliver a 90-minute lecture, and serve as a guest judge for the Street Performer Competition.

== Publications ==
He has published several magic-related books, manuscripts and DVDs. * "Street Cups and Balls". Conjuring Archive. – a book co-authored with Simon Jackson and Gazzo Macee (2004) focused on Gazzo's street performance techniques. * Close, Michael (December 2004). "Gazzo's The Art of Krowd Keeping (review)". MAGIC. 14 (4): 40. – review of The Art of Krowd Keeping, a book about Gazzo's crowd-management methods by Danny Hustle and James E. Wells.

=== Videos and lectures ===
Gazzo has released several instructional videos and lectures on magic performance, many of which are distributed by Penguin Magic and Vanishing Inc.: * "At the Table Live Lecture – Gazzo". Penguin Magic. – a 2016 lecture including live footage from his performance at the Magic Castle. * "Gazzo LIVE: Tricks for the Street". Penguin Magic. * "Gazzo LIVE ACT (Instant Download)". Penguin Magic. * "Gazzo Live Lecture". Vanishing Inc. Magic. * Lovick, John (February 2007). "Gazzo's Street Cups DVD (review)". MAGIC. 16 (6): 46.

== Appearances ==
Gazzo appeared on the seventh episode of Penn & Teller: Fool Us, where he performed his rendition of cups and balls for Penn & Teller to win an opportunity to open their show in Las Vegas. Though the duo knew how the trick was done, they praised Gazzo for his rendition of the trick, stating that he did it "perfectly" and "better than us".
