= Abraham Cantú =

Mexican vaudeville illusionist (1896–1949)

Abraham J. Cantú
- Born: Abraham Juan Cantú Garza; November 24, 1896; Monterrey, Mexico
- Died: August 27, 1949 (aged 52); Atlanta, Georgia, United States
- Other name: Abraham Jhon Cantu
- Occupations: Illusionist, magician

Abraham Juan Cantú (Monterrey, Mexico; November 24, 1896 – Tazewell County, Virginia; August 28, 1949), also known as Professor Tucan, was a Mexican vaudeville illusionist. He is known as the creator of dove magic, an act in which he would make birds in general appear, which inspired other illusionists such as Channing Pollock and Johnny Thompson. Due to his popularity, he performed in theatres and clubs in the United States, Mexico, and Europe. He also appeared in the film Politiquerías (1931), the Spanish-language version of Laurel and Hardy's Chickens Come Home.

He died in an automobile accident while on his way to a performance in Morgantown, West Virginia. Although at first there was a rumor about his death, it was later confirmed, news that caused a stir at the time. Due to his career in the world of magic, he was inducted into the Hall of Fame museum of the Society of American Magicians.

== Origins ==
Abraham Juan Cantú was born in Monterrey, Mexico on November 24, 1896. His parents were Abraham R. Cantú and Leonor Garza, both natives of Monterrey; the couple had five children, and he was the third. His full birth name was Abraham Juan Cantú Garza, sharing his father's name. He grew up in Mexico and did not develop any interest in magic in his youth; during World War I his family was living in San Antonio, Texas, and it was there that he began working as a barber. He later moved to Los Angeles, California, where he lived near the Port of Los Angeles.

In Los Angeles he met the magician Len O. Gunn, who invited him to join the Los Angeles Society of Magicians. Together they learned magic tricks from a book, and in 1925 he performed his first magic act. At one of the society's meetings he won an award for performing a trick. When his father died he suffered greatly, as he had been very close to him; Gunn recalled in an interview that at the funeral he was the only American present and everyone else was Latino. At age 42 he became a naturalized U.S. citizen, although he always claimed to be simply Mexican.

== Performances ==
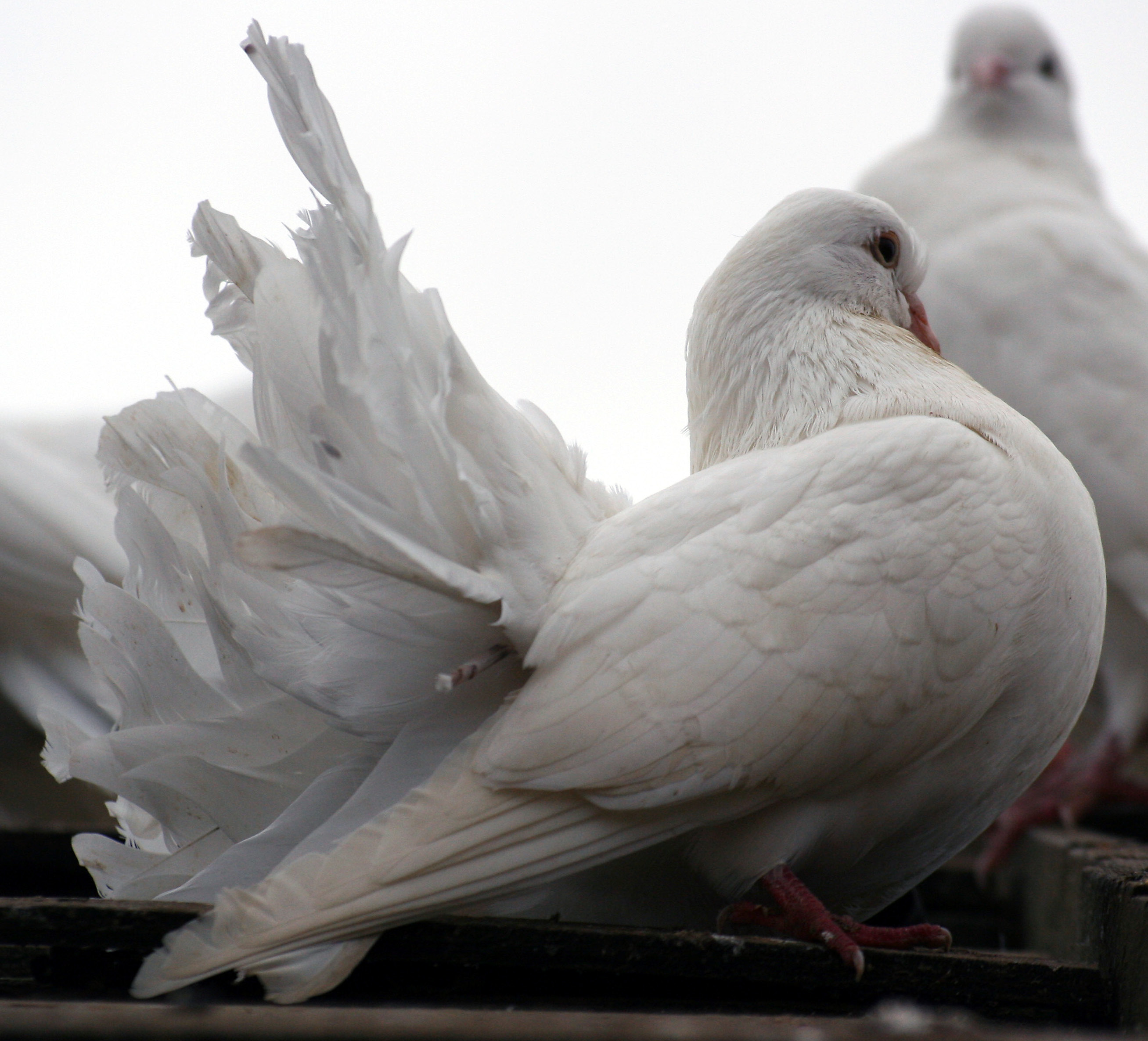
Cantú was the inventor of dove magic, an act in which he would make birds in general appear.

Cantú performed in theatres and clubs in the United States, Mexico, England, Ireland, and France. He dressed in an elegant suit or as a charro during his shows. In his home country, because his surname was very common, he decided to swap its syllables and called himself "Professor Tucan".

While performing his acts, the song "La Paloma" would play. On July 20, 1939, he debuted in London, at the Grosvenor House Cabaret, as a replacement for Ruth and Billy Ambrose. After World War II broke out he had to return to the United States, and during a period of rest, he created and perfected his bird-production technique, for which he was hired at the Leon & Eddie's club in New York, and for four nights was the venue's most successful performer, one of his performances was seen by journalist Walter Winchell, who praised his routine, which allowed the illusionist to secure engagements in other venues.

The writer of Billboard magazine, Johnny Sfppel, criticized Cantú's routine. Although he acknowledged that the performance was "entertaining" at first, it later "lacked spark," with the performer focusing only on "the production of doves from scarves"; he also disparaged the illusionist's outfit and labeled him a "gay Mexican."

== Media appearances ==
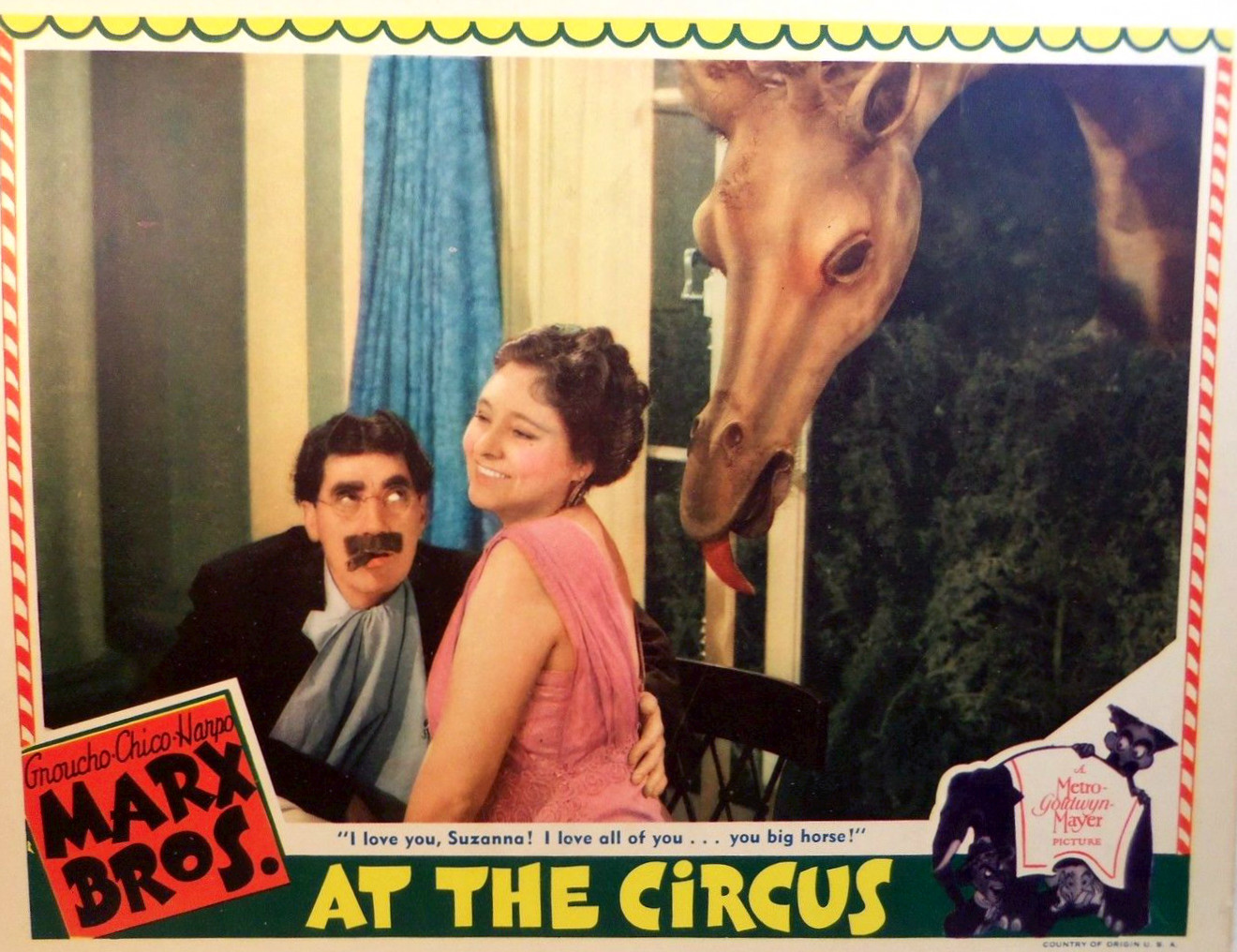
Cantú was a technical advisor on the Marx Brothers film At the Circus, although he was not credited for this work.

He appeared in the film Politiquerías (1931), the extended Spanish-language version of Laurel and Hardy's Chickens Come Home. In the film he played a magician at the party. He was a technical advisor on the Marx Brothers film At the Circus (1939), although he received no credit for this work. Whenever he was interviewed, he was asked whether he "was Spanish?" to which he would reply "no, I am Mexican". He always felt proud of his roots, which is why he wore very colorful charro costumes in his shows, to represent his nationality. In the press, some attributed his success to his manner of dress and his Latino features. In 1944 he was featured on the cover of The Sphinx magazine, shown wearing his country's traditional dress along with his doves.

== Death ==
He died on August 27, 1949, in an automobile accident, while on his way to an engagement in Morgantown, West Virginia. The first to report the news was illusionist Martin Barnett, who mentioned the rumor to Kentucky police officer Lee Allen Estes during a gathering of magicians. His sudden death caused great controversy in the vaudeville world, and there were people who could not believe it, such as columnist Bill Sachs, who even asked his readers to deny it. Another who mourned his death was Gunn, who stated that he "was [his] best friend" and also remembered him as "a gentleman" and "an intelligent man with many original ideas."

== Legacy ==
Cantú is considered the creator of the Buckle Count, a card trick which he taught to Charlie Miller in the late 1930s. He was the inventor of dove magic, in which he produced birds from handkerchiefs, hats, and other props, something that inspired other illusionists such as Channing Pollock and Johnny Thompson, who adapted it for their own shows. Channing said he was inspired by Cantú after seeing him perform his dove act in the late 1940s, likely a year before his death. Due to his career and legacy in the world of magic, he was inducted into the Hall of Fame museum of the Society of American Magicians.

== Bibliography ==
- Robb, Brian J. (2001). Jennifer Steele (ed.). Laurel & Hardy: The Pocket Essential Guide. The Pocket Essentials. p. 77. ISBN 9781842432853.
- Room, Adrian (July 26, 2010). Dictionary of Pseudonyms: 13,000 Assumed Names and Their Origins (5 ed.). McFarland & Company. p. 90. ISBN 978-0-7864-5763-2.
- Warren Chadd, Rachel; Taylor, Marianne (August 25, 2016). Birds: Myth, Lore and Legend. Bloomsbury. p. 118. ISBN 9781472922861.
- Sachs, Bill (November 25, 1950). "Hocus-focus. Of Magic and Magi" (PDF). Billboard. 62 (47): 47.
- "Magic". Billboard. 27 (7): 33. February 17, 1945.
- "Ramona Room, Last Frontier. Hotel, Las Vegas, Nev" (PDF). Billboard. 58 (34): 40. August 24, 1946.
