= Musketeers of the Sea =

- Directed by: Steno
- Written by: Ennio De Concini; Vittorio Metz; Marcello Fondato; Steno; Roberto Gianviti
- Starring: Pier Angeli
- Cinematography: Carlo Carlini
- Music by: Carlo Rustichelli
- Release date: 1962
- Countries: Italy; France
- Languages: Italian; English

Musketeers of the Sea (Italian: I moschettieri del mare) is a 1962 Italian adventure film directed by Steno.

== Cast ==
- Pier Angeli as Consuelo/Altagracia Di Lorna
- Channing Pollock as Pierre De Savigny
- Aldo Ray as Moreau
- Philippe Clay as Gosselin
- Robert Alda as Vice Governor Gomez
- Raymond Bussières as Colonel Ortona
- Carlo Ninchi as Count of Lorna
- Mario Scaccia as King of France
- Carla Calò as Zalamea
- Cesare Fantoni as Father Milita
- Gino Buzzanca as Gutierrez
- Pietro Tordi as Nostromo
- Mario Siletti as Treasurer
