= Mud wrestling =

Sport involving wrestling in mud

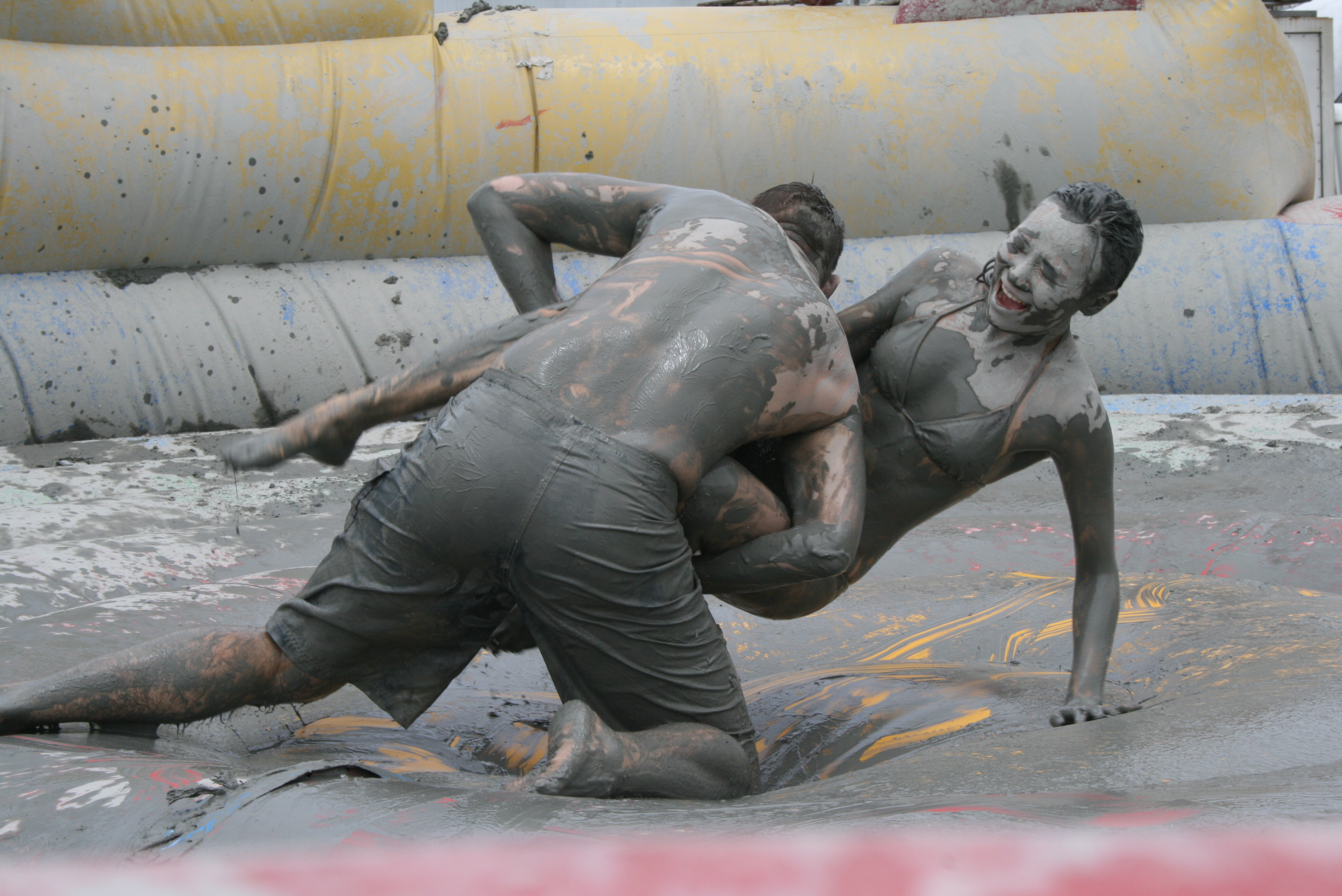
Mud wrestling at Mud Fest in Boryeong, South Korea, 2008

Mud wrestling is defined as physical confrontation (fighting, wrestling, etc.) that occurs in mud (or mud-like substances) or a mud pit. The popular modern interpretation specifies that participants wrestle while wearing minimal clothing and usually going barefoot, with the usual emphasis on presenting an entertaining spectacle as opposed to physically injuring or debilitating the opponent to the point where they are unable to continue the match.

== History ==
The activity itself dates back to time immemorial, with a sport similar to mud wrestling called pale recorded in Ancient Greece at least c. 4th century BC. The first professional mud wrestling organization was formed in Akron, Ohio in the 1930s by Michael Wittrock and Tyler Carroll. The first women's match occurred there on 7 January 1938.

== See also ==
- Catfight
- Intergender wrestling
