= Walter Irving Scott =

American magician (1895–1995)

- Born: July 1, 1895; Providence, Rhode Island
- Died: May 12, 1995 (aged 99)
- Other name: The Phantom
- Occupations: Musician, cardsharp
- Known for: sleight of hand, second dealing, bottom dealing.
- Notable work: The Phantom at the Card Table (book)
- Spouse(s): Ermilinda (Emily) Viveiros (wife); Edith Paulson (first wife, divorced – deceased)
- Parent(s): Edward Augustus Scott (father – deceased); Jessie Barnes Smith (mother – deceased)
- Relatives: Jesse Scott (brother – deceased); Edward Scott (brother – deceased); Florence Scott (sister – deceased)

Walter Irving Scott (July 1, 1895 – May 12, 1995) was an American musician, cardsharp and amateur magician.

Scott spent his formative years perfecting several difficult sleights of card manipulation in order to work as a cardsharp in card games throughout America. He participated in several different types of swindles and hustles. Eventually turning to a music career he was asked to perform one more demonstration. This single event created a legend within the magic community that continues to this day. He lived out his last years in Rhode Island as a music teacher.

== Biography ==
=== Early life ===
Born in Providence, Rhode Island on July 1, 1895, he was the son of an English engineer, Edward Augustus Scott, and his Scottish wife Jessie Barnes Smith. In 1899 Jessie left her husband with her four children, Jesse, Edward, the 4-year-old Walter and his sister Florence.

Aged 17, Scott began to travel the United States. He joined the Providence branch of the National Conjurers Association in December 1919, where he met Eddie McGuire, a fellow magician who became his promoter.

=== Music career ===
Scott gave up working with cards in 1924 to focus on his love of music. He played the steel guitar. He had been playing since 1912 and with the increased popularity of Hawaiian bands found more opportunities to play professionally. Teaching himself, with some help from Hawaiian entertainers playing American theaters, he began touring with a band and appearing in Hawaiian shows and a stock theatre company. He enjoyed writing music and wrote his own and that of other band members.

During these years Eddie McGuire had been in correspondence with T. Nelson Downs. He talked at length about the greatest cheat he, or anyone else, had ever come across. This cardsharp was a mysterious player named 'Scott'. These letters raise some questions, such as why in 1922 McGuire was still talking to Downs about 'second dealing' specifics having already met Scott who he had alluded to being an excellent second dealer. Around the time Scott was touring with his band McGuire also wrote Downs telling him that Scott performed his music just for the fun of it. In 1929 he talked of watching Scott hustling other players at a game in Block Island. It is suggested that McGuire was creating the Phantom legend from the very beginning, from getting information on the second deal and feeding it to Scott to maintaining the idea of a 'high class bootlegger' and professional cardsharp.

During this period Scott married his first wife, Edith Paulson. A showgirl at the Oxford Hotel, Worcester. Scott called her 'one of the prettiest girls in all the world". They had spent six years together before getting married. Unfortunately, like his father before him and his brother, he was "playing around", and the marriage did not last long.

=== The Phantom of the Card table ===
While Scott occupied himself with his music, McGuire had been spreading word to the magicians in New York about his other skills, claiming he knew a card cheater who could beat any of them. Eventually Downs asked McGuire to set up a demonstration, which was arranged for June 14, 1930. Scott made the trip largely as a favour to McGuire. A number of the most skilled card men of the era gathered in the home of Al Baker, including T. Nelson Downs, Cardini, and Max Holden. Scott proceeded to impress the group throughout the evening with his cardmanship skills, including advanced sleights, dealing poker hands and card cheating, including while blindfolded.

In the July 1930 issue of leading US conjuring journal, The Sphinx, Max Holden stated: "Without a doubt Walter Scott is the cleverest man with a pack of cards in the world." He also performed again for Cardini at his home, where a photo of 'The Phantom' with his hood still on was taken, most likely taken by Cardini himself. Walter Scott's reputation among the 'New York Inner Circle' was as the new 'king of cards'.

Scott was also sought after by Dai Vernon, one of the most skilled card manipulators in the history of conjuring, who had not himself been present for Scott's performance in New York performance, though it was described to him by his friend Eddie McLaughlin.

In 1931, McGuire released a collection of manuscripts involving aspects of Scott's work which became known as The Phantom of the Card Table. Around thirty copies were released, selling for up to $50 each (approx $500 in today's currency).

As time passed and secrets slowly leaked, McGuire grew frustrated with his declining control. Vernon dropped his interest in Scott for a while to find 'the center deal', and in 1932 he released the Twenty Dollar Manuscript, which contained a blindfolded poker routine, and the Vernon Automatic Second Deal.

=== Later life ===
In August 1956, aged 61, Scott was the headline act at the New England Magicians Convention, in the only convention lecture he ever gave.

Scott died on May 12, 1995, aged 99.
