= Mady Correll =

Canadian-American actress

Mady Correll (1907 – 1981) was a Canadian-American actress. She made her screen debut in Midnight Madonna after years on Broadway theatre and later starred in Monsieur Verdoux.

== Career ==
Correll acted in various Broadway theatre shows including Springtime for Henry, June Moon, Too Much Party, and Sweet Mystery of Life. She was eventually recruited to make her screen debut in the 1937 drama Midnight Madonna.

She also starred in Charlie Chaplin's film Monsieur Verdoux and George Archainbaud's Texas Masquerade. In 1948, she appeared in the Putnam County Playhouse's production of Secret Service.

== Filmography ==
Year	Title	Role	Notes
1937	Midnight Madonna	Princess Stephanie	
1938	Invisible Enemy	Princess Stephanie	
1941	A Girl, a Guy, and a Gob	Cora	
1942	The Old Chisholm Trail	Belle Turner	
1944	Texas Masquerade	Virginia Curtis	
1944	Moonlight and Cactus	Girl	
1946	The Best Years of Our Lives	Announcer	Uncredited
1947	Monsieur Verdoux	Mona Verdoux - Henri's Wife	(final film role)
