= Cardini =

Cardini is an Italian surname. Notable people with the surname include:

- Caesar Cardini (1896–1956), Italian American restaurateur, chef and hotel owner
- Ignazio Cardini (1566–1602), Corsican doctor, naturalist and humanist of Italian descent
- Leobardo Cardini (or Candiani; 1904–1986), Mexican fencer
- Maria Timpanaro Cardini, born Maria Cardini (1890–1978) Italian philologist

== See also ==
- Richard Valentine Pitchford alias "Cardini" (1895–1973), British master magician
