= Georges Franju =

French filmmaker (1912–1987)

- Born: 12 April 1912; Fougères, France
- Died: 5 November 1987 (aged 75); Paris, France
- Occupations: Director, screenwriter
- Years active: 1934, 1949–1978

Georges Franju (French: [ʒɔʁʒ fʁɑ̃ʒy]; 12 April 1912 – 5 November 1987) was a French filmmaker. He was born in Fougères, Ille-et-Vilaine.

== Biography ==
=== Early life ===
Before working in French cinema, Franju held several different jobs. These included working for an insurance company and a noodle factory. He served briefly in the military in Algeria and was discharged in 1932. Upon his return, he studied to become a set designer and later created backdrops for music halls including Casino de Paris and the Folies Bergère.

In the mid-thirties, Franju and Henri Langlois met through Franju's twin brother Jacques Franju. As well as creating the 16 mm short film Le Métro, Langlois and Franju also started a short-lived film magazine and created a film club called Le Cercle du Cinema with 500 francs he borrowed from Langlois' parents. The club showed silent films from their own collections followed by an informal debate about them amongst members. From Le Cercle du Cinema, Franju and Langlois founded the Cinématheque Française in 1936. Franju ceased to be closely related with the Cinématheque Française as early as 1938, and only became associated with it strongly again in the 1980s when he was appointed as the honorary artistic director of the Cinématheque. In 1937, Franju and Langlois co-founded another less successful film journal titled Cinematographe which had only two issues. In early 1940, Franju and Dominique Johansen co-founded another organization to promote cinema called Circuit Cinématographique des Arts et des Sciences which closed on 31 May 1940.

=== Film career ===
In 1949, Franju began work on a series of nine documentary films. The Nazi occupation of Paris and the industrialism following World War II influenced Franju's early works. His first documentary, The Blood of Beasts (French: Le Sang des Bêtes) was a graphic film of a day inside a Paris slaughterhouse. The second documentary, commissioned by the government in 1950, was Passing By the Lorraine (French: En Passant par la Lorraine). The film was commissioned as a celebration of the modernization of the French industry, but Franju's film showed his view of the ugliness spewing forth from monstrous factories. Franju's third film commissioned by the French government, Hôtel des Invalides (1951), was a look at life inside a veterans' hospital. The film was commissioned as a tribute to the hospital and the War Museum, but Franju turned it into a film against the glorification of militarism. Franju later said that Hôtel des Invalides was his favorite of his three "slaughter" films.

With Head Against the Wall (French: La tête contre les murs) in 1958, Franju turned toward fiction feature films. His second feature was the horror film Eyes Without a Face (French: Les Yeux sans Visage) about a surgeon who tries to repair his daughter's ruined face by grafting on to it the faces of beautiful women. His 1963 film Judex was a tribute to the silent film serials Judex and Fantomas. In Franju's later years his film work became less frequent. Franju occasionally directed for television and in the late seventies he retired from filmmaking to preside over the Cinématheque Française. Georges Franju died on 5 November 1987.

== Film style ==
In her study of French cinema since the French new wave, Claire Clouzot described Franju's film style as "a poignant fantastic realism inherited from surrealism and Jean Painlevé science cinema, and influenced by the expressionism of Lang and Murnau". Franju's focus was on the visual aspect of filmmaking, which he claimed marked a director as an auteur. Franju claimed to "not have the story writing gift" and was focused on what he described as the "putting into form" of the film.

Franju used elements of surrealism and shock horror within his films in order to "awaken" his audience. Franju had a long history of friendship with well-known surrealists including André Breton, and the influence of this movement is extremely evident in his works. Franju uses these elements to link horror, history, and an ironic commentary on modernity's ideal of progress. Franju is quoted as having said "It's the bad combination, it's the wrong synthesis, constantly being made by the eye as it looks around, that stops us from seeing everything as strange." Throughout his documentary Le Sang des bêtes, for example, Franju reminds the audience just how strange everyday life can be. The opening sequence of the film presents the modern age as a "dream land" in which there is a need for some sort of awakening; Franju's awakening comes through historical knowledge. Surrealist depictions of strange mannequins on the city's edge are reminiscent of the bodies of the men wounded in war. Walter Benjamin argued that surrealism must "disturb capitalist culture's mythic assumptions of a rationalized evolving history" which is done by provoking a simultaneous interpretation of the past and the present. This, as Benjamin argues, relies on the recognition of horror within everyday life. Franju does this in many ways throughout Le Sang des bêtes. For example, "La Mer" plays during a sequence in the slaughterhouse, comparing the lyrics to aspects of the slaughter, forcing the audience to interpret the love song in new and horrific ways. A similar contradiction can be seen in the film during scenes in which voiceover narration is used. The use of voiceover in the film works to undermine the form of a more typical documentary film. By alternating male and female narrators, the clinical, typically masculine authority of the documentary film is undermined. During the scene in which the instruments of slaughter are examined, the contradiction between the clinical account of the use of the instruments and the visceral horror of the instruments themselves points out the horrors that are ignored by modern society.

The same is true of Franju's most famous film, Les Yeux sans visage (Eyes Without a Face), which also uses aspects of the scientific documentary film to accentuate horror. Les Yeux sans visage proved so horrific that audience members in Edinburgh fainted during screenings. During the most graphic grafting scene in the film a large importance is placed on surgical lamps, the scalpel being used, gloves, masks, and operating tables. Once again, the contradiction between the methodical, scientific approach to this horrific situation and the situation itself serves to accentuate the horror. Les Yeux sans visage also uses surrealist elements to address aspects of post-war life. During one scene, loud, disrupting noises of an airplane and church bells are heard while Dr. Genessier and Louise bury a failed facial graft candidate. This scene serves to portray the loss of faith in medicine (represented by the body created by another of Dr. Genessier's many failed attempts to complete this surgery), the progress of technology (represented by the airplane), and the comfort of religion (represented by the church bells). This surrealist combination forces a new view of modernity and thus a reevaluation of the past.

== Filmography ==
=== As director ===
Year	Film	English title	Notes
1935	Le Metro	The Metro	co-directed with Henri Langlois
1948	Le Sang des bêtes	Blood of the Beasts	
1950	En passant par la Lorraine	Passing through Lorraine	
1951	Hôtel des Invalides	House of Invalids	
1952	Le Grand Méliès	The Great Méliès	
1952	Monsieur et Madame Curie	Mr. and Mrs. Curie	
1953	Les Poussières	Dust of Life	
1954	Navigation Marchande	Merchant Navigation	Film renounced by Franju.
1955	A propos d'une rivière	About a River	
1955	Mon chien	My dog	
1956	Le Théâtre national populaire	The National Popular Theatre	
1956	Sur le pont d'Avignon	On the bridge of Avignon	
1957	Notre-dame, cathédrale de Paris	Notre-Dame, Cathedral of Paris	
1958	La Première Nuit	The First Night	
1959	La Tête contre les murs	Head Against the Wall	
1960	Les Yeux sans visage	Eyes Without a Face	
1961	Pleins feux sur l'assassin	Spotlight on a Murderer	
1962	Thérèse Desqueyroux	Therese	
1963	Judex	Judex	Remake of 1916 French serial film
1965	Thomas l'imposteur	Thomas the Impostor	Entered into the 15th Berlin International Film Festival
1965	Les Rideaux blancs	The Moment of Peace	Les rideaux blancs segment
1965	Marcel Allain		Short documentary about the writer
1970	La Faute de l'abbé Mouret	The Demise of Father Mouret	
1973	La ligne d'ombre	The Shadow Line	Based on the novella The Shadow-Line (1917) by Joseph Conrad
1974	Nuits rouges	Shadowman	
