= Beau Brummell (disambiguation) =

Beau Brummell (1778–1840) was an arbiter of fashion in Regency England.

Beau Brummell or The Beau Brummells may also refer to:

- Beau Brummel (1913 film), a silent short film by and starring James Young
- Beau Brummel (1924 film), a silent film
- Beau Brummell (1954 film) starring Stewart Granger
- Beau Brummell, play by Clyde Fitch (premiered on May 17, 1890, in New York)
- The Beau Brummels, a 1960s American rock band
- *The Beau Brummels (album) (1975)
- The Beau Brummels (film), a 1928 comedy short film starring Al Shaw & Sam Lee
- Paul Roland or Beau Brummell (born 1959), English songwriter
