= Outlaw Women =

1952 film

- Directed by: Sam Newfield; Ron Ormond
- Written by: Orville H. Hampton
- Produced by: Ron Ormond
- Starring: Marie Windsor; Richard Rober; Carla Balenda; Jackie Coogan; Allan Nixon; Jacqueline Fontaine
- Cinematography: Ellis W. Carter, A.S.C. Harry C. Neumann, A.S.C.
- Edited by: Hugh Winn, A.C.E.
- Music by: Walter Greene
- Production companies: Ron Ormond Productions; Howco
- Distributed by: Lippert Pictures, Inc.
- Release date: April 4, 1952
- Running time: 75 minutes
- Country: United States
- Language: English

Outlaw Women is a 1952 American Western film directed by Sam Newfield and Ron Ormond and starring Marie Windsor, Richard Rober and Carla Balenda. It is set in a remote small town run entirely by women. The film was made in Cinecolor and released by the low-budget specialist Lippert Pictures.

== Opening narration ==
"You know, friends, they always say that on the frontier, men are men, but I'll bet you'd never guess that women are women out here too, eh? Ever hear of Calamity Jane or Big Nose Kate... Belle Starr... Crazy Horse Lil? Ha... Ha... The weaker sex... Why, those little old gals could hold their own against a whole crowd of men. How do I know? Quite a story about that... Started in a little mining town... Silver Creek... a few years back."

== Plot ==
A doctor who is traveling from Silver Creek to Kansas City is abducted from a stagecoach. His kidnappers want him for his professional skills in Los Mujeres, a town controlled by the 'fair' sex. Chief among them is the boss of the Paradise saloon—'Iron' Mae McLeod.

== Cast ==
- Marie Windsor as 'Iron' Mae McLeod
- Richard Rober as Woody Callaway
- Carla Balenda as Beth Larabee
- Jackie Coogan as Piute Bill
- Allan Nixon as Dr. Bob Ridgeway
- Jacqueline Fontaine as Ellen Larabee
- Billy House as Uncle Barney
- Richard Avonde as Frank Slater
- Lyle Talbot as Judge Roger Dixon
- Maria Hart as Dora
- Leonard Penn as Sam Bass
- Tom Tyler as Chillawaka Charlie
- Lou Lubin as Danny
- Cliff Taylor as Old Barfly
- The Four Dandies as Saloon Quartet
- Connie Cezon as one of Uncle Barney's women
- John Martin as saloon patron
- Mary Hill as one of Uncle Barney's women
- Sandy Sanders as Curly
- Diane Fortier as one of Uncle Barney's women
- Paul Gustine as townsman
- Angela Stevens as one of Uncle Barney's women
- Ted Cooper as saloon patron
- Hazel Neilson as wife who demands return of money
- Clark Stevens as henchman
- Riley Hill as John Ringo

Uncredited (in order of appearance)
| Milan Smith | bar patron |
| Artie Ortego | bar patron |
| Kit Guard | townsman |
| Kermit Maynard | stagecoach driver |
| Bud Osborne | stagecoach driver |
| Herman Hack | stagecoach passenger |
| Dolores Fuller | bar girl |
| Frank Ellis | outlaw |
| Mickey Simpson | outlaw |
| Dick Crockett | outlaw |
| Brad Johnson | Chuck |

== Cast notes ==
Seven cast members listed in the opening credits of another Ron Ormond Howco production, 1953's Mesa of Lost Women — Jackie Coogan, Allan Nixon, Lyle Talbot, Mary Hill, John Martin, Dolores Fuller and Dianne Fortier — also appear in this film.

== Songs ==
"Crazy Over You" music and lyrics by June Carr
"Frisco Kate" music and lyrics by Ben Young

== Production ==
The film was the first production of Howco.

== Critical reception ==
Writing in DVD Talk, critic Paul Mavis described the film as "colorful, strange" and "an early feminist Western - until the ending, of course, when paternalism is restored to its rightful place - [that] could have been a minor little gem if more time could have been taken to create the feminine-controlled world," and noted that "it's an entertaining story, with a few good performances." Reviewer Mark Franklin wrote that "The novelty element, and the fact that the directors don't take the subject matter too seriously, make this worth a watch for the curious. For instance, Iron Mae's tough-as-nails bouncer is played by Maria Hart, who keeps all the men in line and shows how tough she is by striking matches with her teeth."

== Bibliography ==
- Pitts, Michael R. Western Movies: A Guide to 5,105 Feature Films. McFarland, 2012.
