= The Daltons' Women =

1950 American Western film by Thomas Carr

- Original film poster
- Directed by: Thomas Carr
- Written by: Ron Ormond; Maurice Tombragel
- Produced by: Ron Ormond
- Music by: Walter Greene
- Production company: Western Adventures Productions Inc.
- Distributed by: Realart Pictures; Howco
- Release date: February 23, 1950
- Running time: 77 minutes
- Country: United States
- Language: English

The Daltons' Women is a 1950 American Western film directed by Thomas Carr starring Lash LaRue and Al "Fuzzy" St. John. It was the seventh of LaRue's films for Ron Ormond's Western Adventures Productions Inc.

The film was the first to be released by Howco, Ron Ormond's new film company composed of Ormond and drive-in movie owners Joy N. Houck and J. Francis White, and director Thomas Carr's first film in the Lash LaRue series. The film features appearances by several well known stars such as Jack Holt, Tom Tyler and Tom Neal and a lengthier running time of 77 minutes featuring a multitude of musical numbers, juggling, and a lengthy catfight. Though the Women of the title have little to do with the narrative of the film, "the frontier's first dance hall belles" were played up in the publicity, with the original film trailer giving Lash LaRue last billing. The film was shot at the Iverson Movie Ranch.

== Plot ==
US Marshal Lash and Deputy Marshal Fuzzy work undercover together with a female Pinkerton detective to end the Dalton Brothers working with a corrupt mayor and sheriff.

== Cast ==
- Lash La Rue ... Marshal Lash La Rue
- Al St. John ... Deputy Fuzzy Q. Jones
- Jack Holt ... Clint Dalton/Mike Leonard
- Tom Neal ... Mayor
- Pamela Blake ... Joan Talbot
- Jacqueline Fontaine ... Jacqueline Fontaine
- Raymond Hatton ... Sheriff Doolin
- Lyle Talbot ... Jim Thorne
- Tom Tyler ... Emmett Dalton
- J. Farrell MacDonald ... Alvin - Stage Company Representative
- Terry Frost ... Jess Dalton/Billy Saunders
- Archie R. Twitchell ... Honest Hank
- Stanley Price ... Manson
- Bud Osborne ... Adams the Stage Driver
- Cliff Taylor ... George the Bartender
- June Benbow ... May
- Henry "Duke" Johnson ... The Juggler

== Criticism ==
"carelessly assembled oater that moves erratically from a thin story line to irrelevant little subplots and gives the general impression that the film was slapped together from bits of disconnected pieces,...the women involved have no relationship between the Dalton Brothers, who themselves are only slightly concerned in the proceedings"-Hollywood Reporter
