= Byron Keith =

American actor

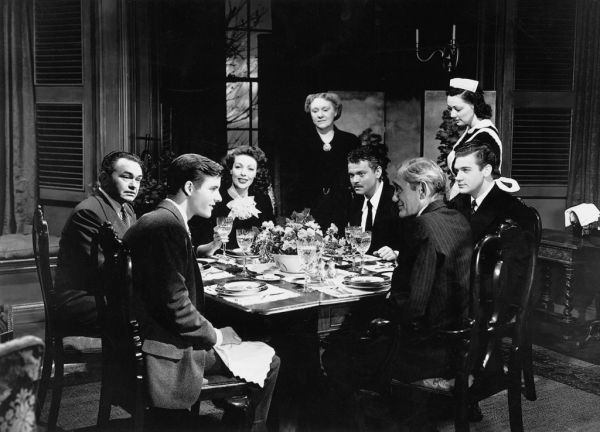
- Byron Keith at right in The Stranger (1946)
- Born: November 17, 1917; El Paso, Illinois, U.S.
- Died: January 19, 1996 (aged 78); Los Angeles, California
- Occupation: Actor
- Years active: 1946–1970

Byron Keith (born Cletus Leo Schwitters; November 17, 1917 – January 19, 1996) was an American actor. He also worked on radio as Clete Lee.

Keith made his film debut in the 1946 Orson Welles thriller The Stranger and appeared mostly in supporting character roles in film and television productions, including Untamed Mistress (1956), The Great Bank Robbery (1969) and Beware! The Blob (1972). He is best known for his recurring part as Gotham City's Mayor Linseed on the 1960s television series Batman. He also had a recurring role as police lieutenant Roy Gilmore in 77 Sunset Strip.

== Filmography ==
Year	Title	Role	Notes
1946	The Stranger	Dr. Jeffrey Lawrence	
1949	Fighting Man of the Plains	Jonas - Lanyard's Secretary	Uncredited
1950	Dallas	Jason Trask	Uncredited
1951	Queen for a Day	The Chauffeur	
1951	Journey Into Light	Dan - Policeman	
1952	The Black Lash	Bill Leonard	
1954	Prisoner of War	Bley Risking	Uncredited
1954	Naked Alibi	Detective	Uncredited
1955	Battle Cry	Recruiting Sergeant	Uncredited
1955	Abbott and Costello Meet the Keystone Kops	Cop	Uncredited
1956	Untamed Mistress	Maharajah Parsta	
1957	Chicago Confidential	TV Announcer	Uncredited
1957	Under Fire	Capt. Tanner	Uncredited
1959	Speed Crazy	Jim Brand	
1961	A Fever in the Blood	Frankie Kovac	Uncredited
1964	Bewitched Episode - "Little Pitchers Have Big Fears"	Coach Gribben	
1965	Brainstorm	Guard	Uncredited
1969	The Great Bank Robbery	Deputy Mort	
1972	Beware! The Blob	Bowling Customer	
