= Jacqueline Fontaine =

American actress and singer (1927–1995)

- Born: Joyce Romeo; August 14, 1927; Kenosha, Wisconsin, U.S.
- Died: August 1, 1995 (aged 67); Las Vegas, Nevada, U.S.
- Occupations: Actress, singer
- Years active: 1950s
- Spouse: John Battaghlia (?-?)

Jacqueline Fontaine (August 14, 1927 – August 1, 1995) was an American actress and singer who was mostly active in the 1950s.

== Biography ==
Fontaine was born Joyce Romeo in Kenosha, Wisconsin to an Italian-born musician father and Canadian-born mother. She married John Battaghlia.

Fontaine died on August 1, 1995, at the age of 67 in Las Vegas, Nevada, United States.

== Filmography ==
- Dilemma of Two Angels (1948)
- The Daltons' Women (1950) as singer
- Skipalong Rosenbloom (1951) as Miss Caroline Witherspoon
- The Strip (1951) as Frieda
- Outlaw Women (1952) as Ellen Larabee
- The Country Girl (1954) as lounge singer
- Untamed Mistress (1956) as Velda
- The Lieutenant Wore Skirts (1956) as buxom date
- Born to Be Loved (1959) as dame
- The Ladies Man (1961) as working girl
- Murderers' Row (1966)
- Guess Who's Coming to Dinner (1967) as singer
- Bilitis (1977) as head mistress
