= Stanley Holden =

Stanley Holden (27 January 1928 – 11 May 2007), born Stanley Herbert Waller, was a British-American ballet dancer and choreographer.

Born in London, he joined the Royal Ballet in 1944 and won notice for performing numerous character roles, especially "Widow Simone" in the 1960 production of La fille mal gardée by Frederick Ashton. After retiring in 1969, he moved to California to teach and perform.

Holden later married American actress and dancer Judy Landon. Holden and Landon remained married for 37 years up to his death. He died from heart disease and colon cancer in Thousand Oaks, California in 2007, at age 79. His former wife Stella Farrance was also a dancer in the Royal Ballet.
