= Buffalo Bill Rides Again =

1947 film by Bernard B. Ray

- Theatrical release poster
- Directed by: Bernard B. Ray
- Produced by: Jack Schwarz executive Robert L. Lippert
- Music by: Modest Altschuler
- Production company: Jack Schwarz Productions
- Distributed by: Screen Guild Productions
- Release date: April 19, 1947
- Running time: 69 minutes
- Country: United States
- Language: English

Buffalo Bill Rides Again is a 1947 American Western film starring Richard Arlen. It is also known as Return of Buffalo Bill.

== Plot ==
Realizing that some seemingly worthless lands in the West are actually rich in untapped oil, entrepreneur JB Jordon wishes to purchase the lands cheaply, form a corporation, and sell its shares at a large profit. When the company's plans are thwarted by settlers who refuse to sell, Jordon hires a gang of local outlaws to terrorize the settlers. As part of the plan, three members of the gang, including their secret leader, businessman ED Simpson, shoot a Native American fur trapper and frame rancher Tom Russell for murder by dumping the furs in Tom's cabin.

In nearby Redfield, Simpson tells the sheriff that he saw Tom shoot the Indian. Before the sheriff can arrest Tom, the murder victim's tribe, led by Brave Eagle, discovers the hidden furs and attacks Tom's ranch. During the fight, Tom's girlfriend Dale Harrington, whose father Steve is Tom's partner, rides off to get help. She meets Buffalo Bill, who was sent by the army to help the settlers. He is able to stop the Indian attack and convince his old friend Brave Eagle to wait three days. By then he hopes to have discovered the identity of the real murderer. After consulting with Buffalo Bill, Tom allows himself to be arrested by the sheriff. On Simpson's orders, the outlaws plan to kill Buffalo Bill by luring him into their hiding place and manipulating the door so that a gun automatically fires at him when it is opened. However, Buffalo Bill suspects the trap and, after a fierce fight, captures the outlaw Jeff. The next day, Buffalo Bill assigns two Indian scouts, Young Bird and White Mountain, to watch the road near the hideout. He tells Dale and Steve that he suspects the outlaws want their land because it contains oil. Meanwhile, the secretive Jeff escapes from prison just as Buffalo Bill and the sheriff are about to release him. Buffalo Bill pursues Jeff, who asks Simpson for help. To avoid being exposed, Simpson shoots Jeff and tells Buffalo Bill that he acted in self-defense.

On the morning of the third day, Young Bird sees Simpson riding to the hideout and follows him. After Simpson orders his men to kidnap Dale, Young Bird is caught outside the hideout. Before Young Bird is locked up, he calls for his horse, which then alerts White Mountain. Meanwhile, Steve leaves his ranch house to fetch water. Dale is kidnapped by the outlaws, who leave a ransom note. While Steve rushes to raise the money for Dale's release, White Mountain watches Dale being abducted by the outlaws and reports to Buffalo Bill. With White Mountain's help, Buffalo Bill sneaks into the hideout and overpowers the outlaws. The freed Dale rides into town to stop Steve, while Buffalo Bill forces the outlaws to reveal the identity of their leader. At the same time, the Indians, having kept their promise, ride off to get Tom out of prison. After Steve, unaware of Dale's rescue, signs his property over to Simpson, Brave Eagle forces the sheriff to hand over Tom. With the deed to Steve's land, Simpson reveals his plans and announces that he and his men will take over the land. Buffalo Bill, Steve, and the sheriff's posse head to the Harrington Ranch and meet with the Indians and Tom. Buffalo Bill convinces Brave Eagle to join forces with him to defeat the real killers. Simpson and his men are eventually routed. Later, a grateful Steve, Dale, and Tom, having discovered that their land is actually rich in oil, bid Buffalo Bill a fond farewell.

== Cast ==
- Richard Arlen as Buffalo Bill
- Jennifer Holt as Dale Harrington
- Lee Shumway as Steve Harrington
- John Dexter as Tom Russell
- Paula Hill as Sue Jackson

== Production ==
The film was the first produced by Jack Schwarz under a three-year contract with Screen Guild Productions. It was meant to result in 12 films.
