= Shaw and Lee =

Comedy team of stage, screen, radio, TV

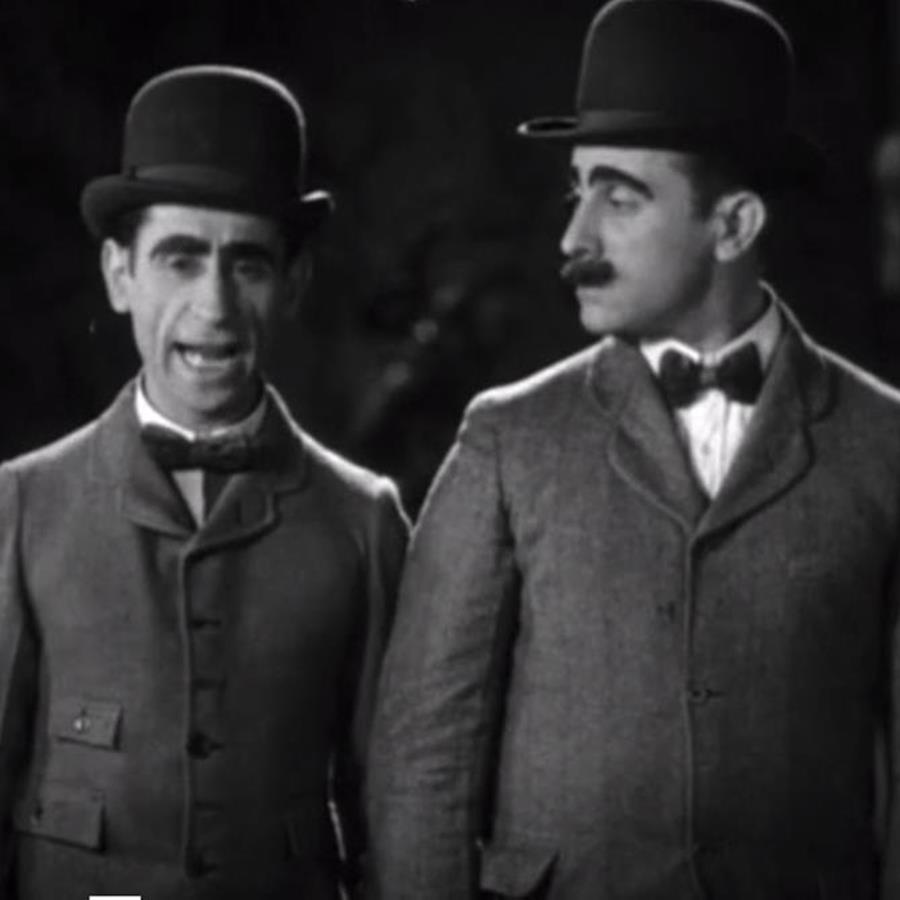
Shaw and Lee in the 1928 Vitaphone short The Beau Brummels

Shaw and Lee were a comedy team, active on stage, screen, radio, and television from 1911 to 1957. They are best known for their 1928 Vitaphone film The Beau Brummels, in which they deliver nine minutes of their jokes-and-songs vaudeville act. The film, unseen for 79 years, was restored by Warner Bros. and The Vitaphone Project in 2007, combining the surviving mute picture element and the original soundtrack recording. The restoration was released theatrically and on video, introducing Shaw and Lee to modern audiences. The film and the team caught on quickly among vintage-film buffs, and in 2016 the film was selected for inclusion in the National Film Registry as "culturally, historically, or aesthetically significant."

Al Shaw (standing on the left in the photo) was born Albert Schutzman in Manchester, England on April 1, 1891. He immigrated to the United States in 1907, and according to his 1918 draft record he stood 5 feet, 3 inches tall and had brown hair and blue eyes.

Sam Lee (standing on the right) was born Samuel Levy in Newark, New Jersey on July 12, 1891. He stood 5 feet, 6-1/2 inches tall. His two brothers were also in show business: Harry Lee, a 10-year member of the Jack Benny production staff; and Archie Levy, treasurer of the Radio City Music Hall.

== Early years ==
Shaw and Lee entered American vaudeville in 1911 with a dancing act, and soon established themselves as a popular team. "Shaw and Lee recently finished 27 weeks on S. and C. [Sullivan and Considine] time. The boys met with success all the way." The theatrical publication The New York Clipper described their early act: "Shaw and Lee are two energetic dancers of earnest methods, and their singing was also a factor. They introduce some clever steps and dress neatly." This was a far cry from the Shaw and Lee seen in their film exhibits, where they usually dress shabbily and perform eccentric dance steps that are secondary to their comic dialogue. They continued to work on the humorous aspects of their act, as Variety reported: "Shaw and Lee are two boys who attempt eccentric dancing, but really shine when doing a buck and wing routine. The eccentric work is not as smooth as it should be as yet." The team generally opened the show or were the second act on the bill during this period, and experimented with their presentation; a 1917 review described them as "high-hatted hoofers."

Shaw and Lee advanced from vaudeville to a specialty act in musical shows. World War I interrupted their career but only temporarily. Shaw was drafted into the U. S. Army in August 1917, but evidently rejected because of his slight frame. He was back working with Lee in September: "Shaw and Lee, which was such a sensation with The Bostonians last season, will join the Stop, Look and Listen show in September." In the early 1920s they were billing themselves as "Nature's Gifts" and were working on the prestigious B. F. Keith vaudeville circuit.

By 1922 they had polished their act and were now playing "next to closing", the headline spot on the bill. Variety reviewed a typical 12-minute performance: "Comedy extremists. Two men with ill-fitting clothes, hair parted in center and plastered down on sides. Open with parody of 'Strolling Through the Park' following with slow dance. More comedy verses with a limerick or two and another dance. Some good talk, cleverly handled and all well appreciated with a dancing finish. This combination have [sic] a good comedy specialty, not particularly original in construction, but their routine shows no marks of familiarity." They continued to hone their act, adopting a dry, deadpan delivery quite unlike the cheery, friendly stand-up comics of the day. "The humor for their stuff is the keen burlesque they do on the old-fashioned song and dance turn. World of smooth satire in their posings and their demeanor of earnest, solemn unison stepping. The grotesque acrobatics, particularly the limp flopping about of the smaller man, is genuinely funny." In 1927 they reached the height of the vaudeville world, playing the Palace Theatre in New York.

== Debut in motion pictures ==
The Warner Bros. studio, having popularized talking pictures, hired many Broadway and vaudeville artists to perform their acts for Vitaphone short subjects. Shaw and Lee made their screen debut in The Beau Brummels (1928), which faithfully captures their defiantly deadpan stage act and emphasizes spoken-word comedy, with plenty of creaky jokes and awful puns:

Lee: Twenty people under one umbrella. Not one got wet.
Shaw: How's that?
Lee: It wasn't raining.

Lee: Around this house we have a porch. On this porch we keep 30,000 geese.
Shaw: Thirty thousand geese on your porch?
Lee: On my porch.
Shaw: They must be Porch-a-geese.

There is no plot and no supporting cast, just the two comedians holding their positions before the camera. Exhibitors Herald-World described them as a "happy and hilarious couple", and Film Daily noted the corny jokes and crazy dancing: "They get away with it because they know how to put it over [with] snap and perfect delivery. They score the laughs on some old jokes that will fall flat among wise audiences but will probably go big in the sticks." Vitaphone engaged them for a second reel, Going Places (1930), which had more production. The premise has the two deadbeats crashing a nightclub where, as patrons, they run through their patter and dance steps.

Showman Sam Katz cautioned movie-theater managers to treat these vaudeville-in-a-can films as major attractions. "If Shaw and Lee at $1000 per week came to a little town, the manager would lie awake nights, figuring out schemes to promote the public interest to the point where the $1000 would come back with a profit. It's got to be done with talking films, too. Everything is just as great a novelty as you yourself make it."

== Stage, screen, and radio ==
Like fellow comedy team Clark and McCullough, Shaw and Lee made films only on a part-time basis, concentrating on their live performances on stage. In early 1930 they had just completed a run in the Lee Shubert show Pleasure Bound when the Loew's theater circuit signed them for a vaudeville tour at $2000 per week, the highest salary they had earned to date. They opened at New York's Capitol Theatre, which adopted them as regulars. They were still there two years later: "Shaw and Lee for some reason are hardy perennials at the house. At this performance they were a solid score with their nut pantomime, even if their early doggerel song lyrics and exchange of talk did miss the mob further back."

Later in 1932 they departed for Hollywood, where they made a few two-reel comedies for Universal Pictures; the original agreement called for four films with an option for four more, but the option was not taken up. The studio may have been reluctant to take on any new commitments, because its entire two-reel-comedy department shut down soon afterward. That same year Shaw and Lee also starred in a Columbia short directed by Bryan Foy, Mind Doesn't Matter. These films are out of circulation today.

In 1934 they were starring on stage in George White's Scandals but were open to screen offers. Metro-Goldwyn-Mayer, which made the most expensive films in the industry, found a way to recoup some of its costs during the Depression years: the studio took unused scenes from musical feature films and built new short subjects around them. The stars in the new scenes were usually vaudeville entertainers like Ted Healy and his Three Stooges, and Richy Craig, Jr. Shaw and Lee made a single two-reeler for MGM, Gentlemen of Polish (1934). For this appearance Shaw and Lee played characters similar to Laurel and Hardy: Lee assumed a smoother screen personality, with a dapper mustache and a more genteel manner of speech like Oliver Hardy, always frustrated by his bungling partner Shaw. This short used some of the sets from the feature film Hollywood Party, and included an unused screen test of singers Shirley Ross and Harry Barris.

The team was featured in two Paramount features, You Belong to Me and Mrs. Wiggs of the Cabbage Patch (both 1934), and the studio was in negotiations with the team for more movies. Shaw and Lee wound up freelancing, working for various studios in featured roles. These weren't always musical or comedy specialties, either; in King of Burlesque (1935) Shaw and Lee have straight character roles, as a couple of Broadway songwriters. They kept returning to New York's Capitol Theatre, "headlining [the] best variety show in town."

In 1937 they were featured on Jack Oakie's network radio show, and headlined the CBS show Double Everything. The latter was a variety program sponsored by Philip K. Wrigley's Doublemint chewing gum, and in keeping with the Doublemint theme the show featured two comedians, two orchestras, two piano teams, two sextets, and twin girl singers. Shaw and Lee continued to work occasionally in feature films but more regularly on radio, as Variety reported when reviewing their stage act in 1943: "Shaw and Lee, the vet vaude team more recently identified with radio, register strongly with some new patter. They're still doing some of their oldtime panto business, which is still sock material and garners them some of the evening's top plaudits." In 1948 they starred in a production of The Blue Danube at the Los Angeles Philharmonic Auditorium, and their 1949 vaudeville appearance at the Orpheum Theatre in Los Angeles was equally successful. "Al Shaw and Sam Lee dish up old gags that the audience eats up."

== Into the 1950s ==
Al Shaw and Sam Lee were early arrivals in the new field of commercial television, appearing on Ed Wynn's network show.

The rise of television had resulted in vaudeville acts performing their specialties for home audiences. Some movie studios produced similar vaudeville revues for the screen. Vaudeville star and producer June Carr rounded up a number of her old show-business friends for a new feature film, Hollywood Varieties (filmed in five days in 1949; released 1950), with Robert Alda as the singing master of ceremonies and Shaw and Lee as the featured comedians. Lippert's low-budget productions catered to neighborhood theaters, particularly in rural locations, and this vaudeville hour was aimed directly at that market. "Hollywood Varieties is a good offering for the small towns and rural areas where there is little chance for the patrons to see a vaudeville show," reported Showmen's Trade Review. "There is no storyline to tie the various acts together. Just a group of vaudevillians doing their stuff to entertain the customers." In at least two trade publications, Shaw and Lee were listed first in the cast.

The team also appeared in the big-screen Hopalong Cassidy burlesque Skipalong Rosenbloom (1951), co-starring Maxie Rosenbloom and Max Baer. Shaw and Lee contributed comedy bits for the TV series Star Time, broadcast on the DuMont Television Network.

Al Shaw suffered a heart attack and died on July 7, 1957 at his home in Burbank, California. Survived by his wife and twin sons, he was 66. Shaw and Lee's last film appearance, in the 1958 George Gobel comedy I Married a Woman (for which the team was hired in November 1956), was released after Shaw's death. Sam Lee lived in retirement in Los Angeles until his death at age 88, on January 9, 1980.

== Partial filmography ==
The Beau Brummels (1928)

- The Beau Brummels (1928)
- Young and Beautiful (1934)
- Mrs. Wiggs of the Cabbage Patch (1934)
- King of Burlesque (1935)
- The King and the Chorus Girl (1937)
- Under Western Skies (1945)
- Hollywood Varieties (1950)
- I Married a Woman (1958)
