= Skipalong Rosenbloom =

1951 film by Sam Newfield

- Directed by: Sam Newfield
- Screenplay by: Eddie Forman; Dean Riesner
- Story by: Eddie Forman
- Produced by: Wally Kline
- Starring: Maxie Rosenbloom; Max Baer; Jackie Coogan; Fuzzy Knight; Hillary Brooke; Jacqueline Fontaine
- Cinematography: Ernest Miller
- Edited by: Victor Lewis; J.R. Whittredge
- Music by: Irving Gertz
- Production company: Wally Kline Enterprises
- Distributed by: United Artists
- Release date: April 30, 1951
- Running time: 71 minutes
- Country: United States
- Language: English

Skipalong Rosenbloom is a 1951 American Western film directed by Sam Newfield, written by Eddie Forman and Dean Riesner and starring Maxie Rosenbloom, Max Baer, Jackie Coogan, Fuzzy Knight, Hillary Brooke and Jacqueline Fontaine. The film was released on April 30, 1951 by United Artists.

== Plot ==
A Western town is terrorized by a gang of outlaws and trick a newcomer into becoming sheriff.

== Cast ==
- Maxie Rosenbloom as Skipalong Rosenbloom
- Max Baer as Butcher Baer
- Jackie Coogan as Buck Lovelace
- Fuzzy Knight as Sneaky Pete
- Hillary Brooke as Square Deal Sal
- Jacqueline Fontaine as Caroline Witherspoon
- Raymond Hatton as Granpappy Tex Rosenbloom
- Ray Walker as TV announcer
- Al Shaw as Al
- Sam Lee as Sam
- Joseph J. Greene as Judge Bean
- Dewey Robinson as Honest John
- Whitey Haupt as The Pecos Kid
- Carl Mathews as fake Indian
- Artie Ortego as henchman Artie
