= Tandra Quinn =

American actress (1931–2016)

- In Mesa of Lost Women (1953)
- Born: Derline Jeanette Smith; March 27, 1931; Los Angeles, California
- Died: September 21, 2016 (aged 85); Panama City Beach, Florida
- Occupation: Actress
- Years active: 1950s
- Spouse: Herbert Smithson
- Children: 2

Tandra Quinn (also credited as Jeanette Quinn; born March 27, 1931 – September 21, 2016) was a Hollywood film actress and pin-up model mostly active in the 1950s.

== Selected filmography ==
- Week-End at the Waldorf (1945) as schoolgirl (uncredited)
- Girls in the Night (1953) as Rose, a beauty contestant (uncredited)
- Problem Girls (1953) as Judith
- Mesa of Lost Women (1953) as Tarantella
- The Neanderthal Man (1953) as Celia
