= Hellfire (1949 film) =

1949 film

- Theatrical release poster
- Directed by: R. G. Springsteen
- Written by: Dorrell McGowan; Stuart E. McGowan
- Produced by: William J. O'Sullivan
- Starring: Wild Bill Elliott; Marie Windsor; Forrest Tucker; Jim Davis
- Cinematography: Jack A. Marta
- Edited by: Tony Martinelli
- Music by: R. Dale Butts
- Production company: Elliott-McGowan Productions
- Distributed by: Republic Pictures
- Release date: May 29, 1949 (United States)
- Running time: 90 minutes
- Country: United States
- Language: English

Hellfire is a 1949 American Trucolor Western film directed by R. G. Springsteen starring Wild Bill Elliott, Marie Windsor, Forrest Tucker and Jim Davis.

== Plot ==
Drifting gambler Zeb Smith promises a dying preacher who saved his life that he will fulfill the preacher's lifelong goal of building a church. He needs money, and a $5,000 reward is out for lady outlaw Doll Brown, who murdered Lew Stoner, her husband. Stoner's brothers Gyp, Red and Dusty are after her as well, as is Zeb's law-abiding pal, Marshal Bucky McLean.

Doll mocks his newfound faith and knocks Zeb unconscious after their first meeting. She rides to Cheyenne to look for her little sister, Jane Carson. The sheriff there, Duffy, tries to arrest Doll, and soon Bucky rides into town, too.

On the run, Zeb and Doll hide out in a cabin. By the time Bucky rides up, Doll's changed her whole look and he does not recognize her. Bucky confides to Zeb that he is married to Jane and would like to see Doll dead so no one will ever know Jane's dark family secret, that her sister is a notorious outlaw.

After being captured and roughed up by the Stoner boys, an angry Zeb is deputized by Duffy and goes after them. He arrests Doll, but she gets the drop on him in jail, locking him up. Doll is shot twice by the Stoners, who are about to shoot her again when Zeb manages to do away with all three. In his arms, Doll finally comes to appreciate Zeb's faith in God.

== Cast ==
- Wild Bill Elliott as Zeb Smith (as William Elliott)
- Marie Windsor as Doll Brown, also known as Mary Carson
- Forrest Tucker as Bucky McLean
- Jim Davis as Gyp Stoner
- H. B. Warner as Brother Joseph
- Paul Fix as Dusty Stoner
- Grant Withers as Sheriff Martin
- Emory Parnell as Sheriff Duffy
- Esther Howard as Birdie
- Jody Gilbert as Full Moon
- Louis Faust as Red Stoner (as Louis R. Faust)
- Harry Woods as Lew Stoner
- Denver Pyle as Rex
- Trevor Bardette as Wilson
- Dewey Robinson as Cheyenne Bartender
- Paula Hill as Rusty
