= Judy Landon =

American actress and dancer (1928–2021)

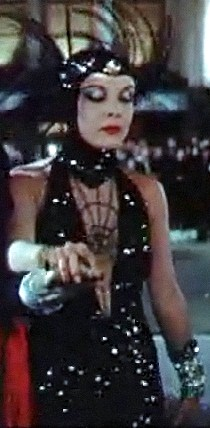
- Judy Landon as screen vamp Olga Mara in Singin' in the Rain (1952)
- Born: Judith Brenna Landon; February 26, 1928; Cook County, Illinois, U.S.
- Died: October 31, 2021 (aged 93); Thousand Oaks, California, U.S.
- Years active: 1950–1973
- Spouse: Brian Keith (m. 1954; div. 1969)
- Children: 5

Judith Brenna Landon (February 26, 1928 – October 31, 2021) was an American actress and dancer who primarily played uncredited bit parts in films in the early 1950s, particularly a background dancer in movie musicals.

== Career ==
Particularly notable roles include Eras in the film Prehistoric Women (1950) and an uncredited but recognizable performance as the silent screen vamp Olga Mara in Singin' in the Rain (1952). All of her film roles except for Prehistoric Women were in musical films, and all of her musical film roles, except in Gentlemen Prefer Blondes (1953), were made by Metro-Goldwyn-Mayer. Prior to her film career she had danced with various theatrical groups including the Los Angeles Civic Light Opera. After her film career ended she made a few television appearances, including as a ballet teacher on an episode of The Brady Bunch, and an episode of her then husband Brian Keith's show Family Affair.

== Personal life ==
Landon married actor Brian Keith in 1954. They lived in a mansion in Bel-Air together and had two children and adopted three others before they divorced in 1969. She later married the English ballet dancer, Stanley Holden, to whom she remained married for 37 years until his death in 2007. Judy Landon died in Thousand Oaks, California on October 31, 2021, at the age of 93.

== Filmography ==
- Prehistoric Women (1950) as Eras
- An American in Paris (1951) as a dancer in the "Stairway to Paradise" sequence (uncredited)
- Aladdin and His Lamp (1952) as Dancing girl
- Limelight (1952) an extra on the first balcony
- Singin' in the Rain (1952) as Olga Mara, a screen vamp (uncredited)
- The Band Wagon (1953) as dancer in troupe. (uncredited)
- Gentlemen Prefer Blondes (1953) as chorus girl in "Diamonds Are a Girl's Best Friend" (uncredited)
- Family Affair (1967 – 1 episode) as Margo Dunbar
- The Brady Bunch (1973 – 1 episode) as Miss Clariette
