= Allan Nixon =

American novelist (1915–1995)

- An autographed photo
- Born: August 17, 1915; Boston, Massachusetts
- Died: April 13, 1995 (aged 79); Los Angeles, California
- Occupations: Actor, novelist
- Spouse: Marie Wilson (married 1942–1950)

Allan Hobbs Nixon (August 17, 1915 – April 13, 1995) was an American actor and novelist.

== Career ==
Nixon was born in Boston, Massachusetts in 1915. He studied journalism the University of Richmond but left college to play football professionally. He was signed to the Washington Redskins but only played in the exhibition season. After a stint with a farm team in Norfolk, Virginia, he wrestled professionally, and then went to New York to become a reporter. Instead, 6'6" and attractive Nixon ended up modeling and was scouted by MGM.

He was drafted during World War II, but his wife, Marie Wilson, saw to it that he was assigned guard duty. Nixon also starred in the sex hygiene film Three Cadets made by the First Motion Picture Unit. Republic Pictures had been interested in putting him in westerns, but this interest had faded by the end of the war.

RKO considered Nixon for the role of Tarzan following the retirement of Johnny Weissmuller, but the role went to Lex Barker.

He is most known for his leading role in the independent film Prehistoric Women.

He appeared in the Carleton Holmes play Free for All in Los Angeles in 1947, with a review stating that he had played his role with "effective sincerity." He appeared in the play Kitty Doone by Aben Kandel in 1949. He was also on stage in Miranda, You Only Twinkle Once, Rain, School for Scandal, Three Out of Four, and Anna Lucasta; the latter was a touring production in which Ann Dvorak costarred.

Shortly after being signed by Columbia and performing in the successful Hugo Haas film Pickup, Nixon began refusing the small roles in B pictures offered to him. He was blacklisted by Harry Cohn and months later asked to be released from his contract. He claimed that all of the studios banded together to keep him from working. Nixon, by then divorced from Wilson, worked in construction for several years.

Producer Ron Ormond cast him in such films as Outlaw Women and Mesa of Lost Women and as the lead in The Little People, a modern take on Gulliver's Travels, but the series was not picked up. Nixon appeared on various television shows in the 1950s and early 1960s, including Gunsmoke.

Nixon was an informant for Confidential Magazine; this became public knowledge during the Confidential trial in 1957.

Nixon became a writer in the early 1960s, publishing novels with such titles as The Sex Symbol and The Bitch Goddess. He wrote under his own name and the pseudonyms Nick Allen as well as several Shaft novels under the pen name Don Romano, finding more success as a writer than as an actor. He later reflected on his career as an actor, "Things went wrong, just put it that way. I'm not bitter. I enjoyed it. I enjoyed the people I met and the fun I had."

== Personal life and death ==
Nixon met actress Marie Wilson while they were filming Rookies on Parade. Wilson was still engaged to director Nick Grinde when she and Nixon eloped in 1942. After two separations and reconciliations, they divorced in 1950 following years of stress due to Nixon's underemployment, and public embarrassments due to Nixon's tendency to get into violent altercations and drive under the influence of alcohol.

Nixon married three more times. His second marriage, to Alma Hammond, was annulled shortly after it took place in 1954. He and his third wife, Velda May Paulsen, got into a violent altercation that made headlines in early 1958. Paulsen went to visit an old boyfriend, Burt Lancaster, in the hospital. Nixon, displeased that his wife went to see Lancaster, reportedly struck Paulsen, and Paulsen attacked him with kitchen knives Nixon had given her for Christmas. The fight resulted in Paulsen being arrested for attempted murder, but Nixon refused to press charges and the two reconciled. She died of burns suffered in an explosion later that year. Nixon's fourth wife was Maria Magda.

He was a longtime friend of Arthur Kennedy and John Lund, the latter of whom had played Wilson's boyfriend in the My Friend Irma films.

Nixon died of emphysema in 1995.

== Partial filmography ==
- Three Cadets (1941; sex hygiene short)
- Rookies on Parade (1942; uncredited)
- Linda, Be Good (1947)
- Siren of Atlantis (1949)
- Prehistoric Women (1950)
- Pickup (1951)
- Outlaw Women (1952)
- Road to Bali (1952; uncredited)
- Mesa of Lost Women (1953)
- Untamed Mistress (1956; also uncredited codirector)
- Apache Warrior (1957)
- Wall of Noise (1963; uncredited)

== Selected novels ==
- Blessed Are the Damned. New York: Paperback Library. 1963. OCLC 1007773647.
- Nobody Hides Forever. New York: Paperback Library. 1964. OCLC 1017134361. Later titled The Star.
- The Last of Vicky. New York: Paperback Library. 1966. OCLC 1007773138.
- Malibu Pickup. North Hollywood, California: Brandon House. 1966. OCLC 646179292.
- Get Garrity. North Hollywood, California: Brandon House. 1966. OCLC 646156932.
- The Actor. New York: Paperback Library. 1968. OCLC 9679097.
- Shadow of a Man. New York: Avon Books. 1969. ISBN 0380460602. OCLC 655840881.
- The Sex Symbol. London: New English Library. 1969. OCLC 877766330.
- The Starlet. London: New English Library. 1969. OCLC 877218998.
- The Bitch Goddess: A Novel of Hollywood on the Make. Paperback Library. 1969. OCLC 30269330.
- Garrity. London: New English Library. 1970. OCLC 877160953.
- Go for Garrity. New York: Avon Books. 1970. OCLC 54061390.
- The Gold and Glory Guy. New York: Avon. 1970.
- The Scavengers. London: New English Library. 1970. OCLC 441031808.
- Good night Garrity. London: New English Library. 1971. OCLC 877161043.
- Power Man. New York: Avon. 1972. OCLC 18437417.
- Nikki. Playboy Press. 1977. ISBN 9780872163836.

=== As Nick Allen ===
- The Meal Ticket. North Hollywood, California: Brandon House. 1966. OCLC 646185047.
- Dynasty of Decadence. North Hollywood, California: Brandon House. 1966. OCLC 475671848.

=== As Don Romano ===
- Operation Porno. New York: Pyramid Books. 1973. ISBN 0515031704. OCLC 30535919.
- Operation Cocaine. New York: Pyramid Books. 1973. OCLC 1030954.
- Operation Hit Man. New York: Pyramid Books. 1974. ISBN 0515034444. OCLC 9766751.
