= Paula Hill =

Hollywood and television actress

- Born: Paula Mary Hill; February 15, 1926; Birmingham, Alabama
- Died: February 15, 2000 (aged 74); Los Angeles, California
- Occupation: Actress
- Years active: 1950s

Paula Hill (also credited as Mary Hill) was a Hollywood film and television actress mostly active in the 1950s.

== Biography ==
She was born Paula Mary Hill in 1926 in Birmingham, Alabama. In some of her early films, she was credited as Mary Hill, including her most known lead role in the 1953 sci-fi film Mesa of Lost Women. Later in her career, Hill appeared in smaller roles in such classic Hollywood movies as The Greatest Show on Earth (1952) and The Beast from 20,000 Fathoms (1953).

Hill also played a number of roles in the various TV shows, such as Dragnet (1956) and The Red Skelton Show (1957). Overall, she had leading roles in some 20 programs. In 1960, she retired from the movie business to be a lounge singer and theatre actress. Hill also kept a school of theatrical instruction.

She returned to the screen playing cameos in The Soldier of Fortune (1991) and Chump Change (2000).

A heavy smoker all her life, Hill died from a stroke on her 74th birthday in 2000 in Los Angeles.

== Selected filmography ==
- Chump Change (2000) as Manager #2
- The Soldier of Fortune (1991) as Gossiping Woman
- Mickey Spillane's Mike Hammer (TV series, 1958–1959) as Janet Kellogg
- M Squad (TV series, 1957–1960) as Mrs. Warman
- Jane Wyman Presents The Fireside Theatre (TV series, 1955–1958)
- Highway Patrol (TV series, 1955–1959) as Waitress
- Hot Cars (1956) as Mrs. Davenport
- Mesa of Lost Women (1953) as Doreen Culbertson
- The Beast from 20,000 Fathoms (1953) as Nesbitt's Secretary
- Letter to Loretta (TV series, 1953–1961) as Diane
- Outlaw Women (1952) as One of Uncle Barney's Girls
- Models Inc. (1952) as Millie
- Dragnet (TV series, 1951–1959) as Peggy Greggson
- The George Burns and Gracie Allen Show (TV series, 1950–1958) as Sabrina Doyle
- Hellfire (1949) as Rusty
- Buffalo Bill Rides Again (1947) as Sue Jackson
