= Vitaphone =

Sound system for film

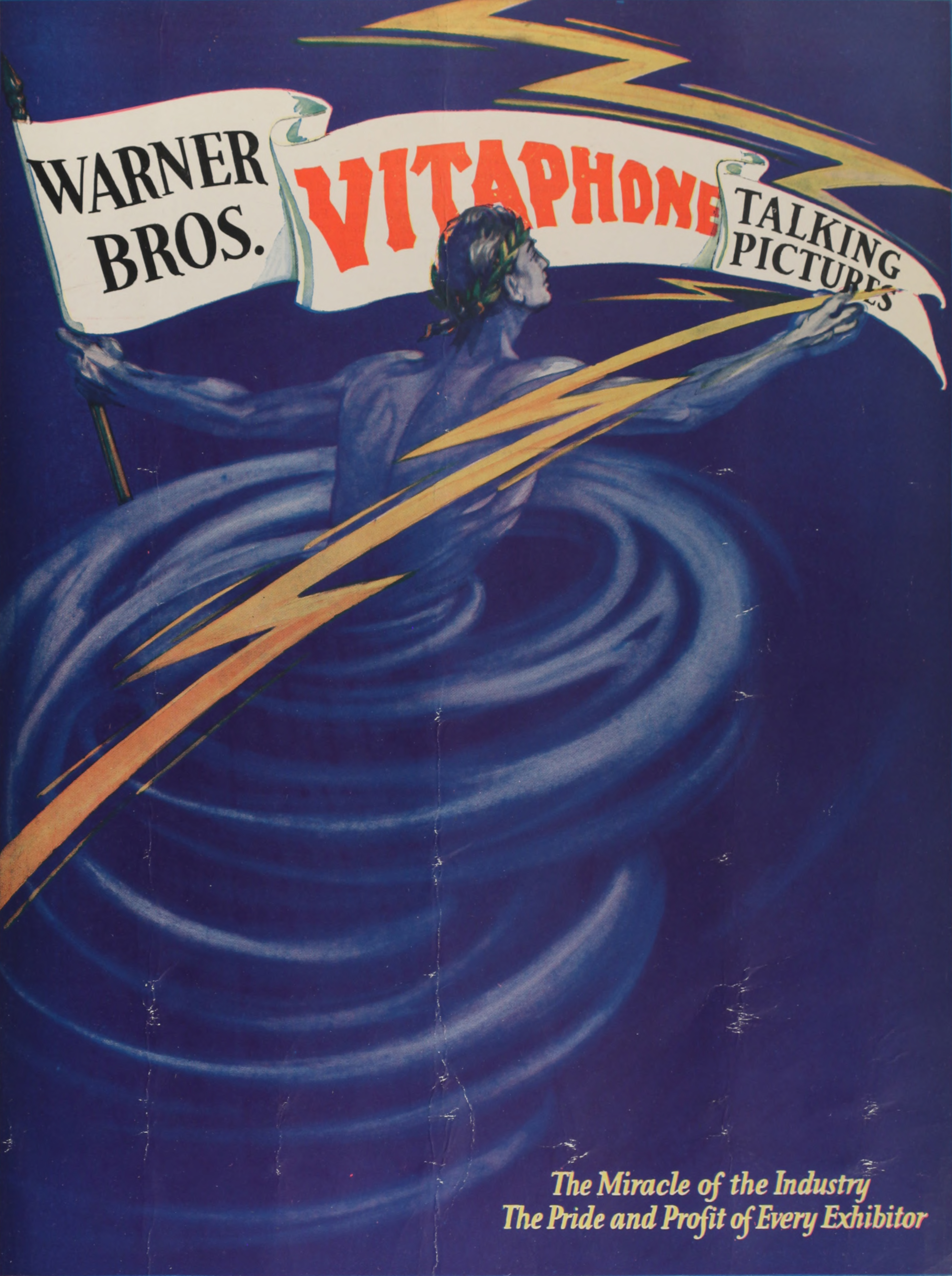
- Warner Bros. Vitaphone logo
- Type: Subsidiary of Warner Bros. Pictures
- Founded: 1926; 100 years ago
- Defunct: 1959; 67 years ago
- Headquarters: Los Angeles, California, United States
- Products: Motion pictures
- Parent: Warner Bros. Pictures

Vitaphone was a sound film system used for feature films and nearly 1,000 short films made by Warner Bros. Pictures and its sister studio First National from 1926 to 1931. Vitaphone is the last major analog sound-on-disc system and the only one that was widely used and commercially successful. The soundtrack is not printed on the film, but issued separately on phonograph records. The discs, recorded at 33 1/3 rpm (a speed first used for this system) and typically 16 inches (41 cm) in diameter, are played on a turntable physically coupled to the projector motor while the film is projected. Its frequency response is 4300 Hz. Many early talkies, such as The Jazz Singer (1927), used the Vitaphone system. The name "Vitaphone" derived from the Latin and Greek words, respectively, for "living" and "sound".

The "Vitaphone" trademark was later associated with cartoons and other short subjects that had optical soundtracks and did not use discs.

== Early history ==
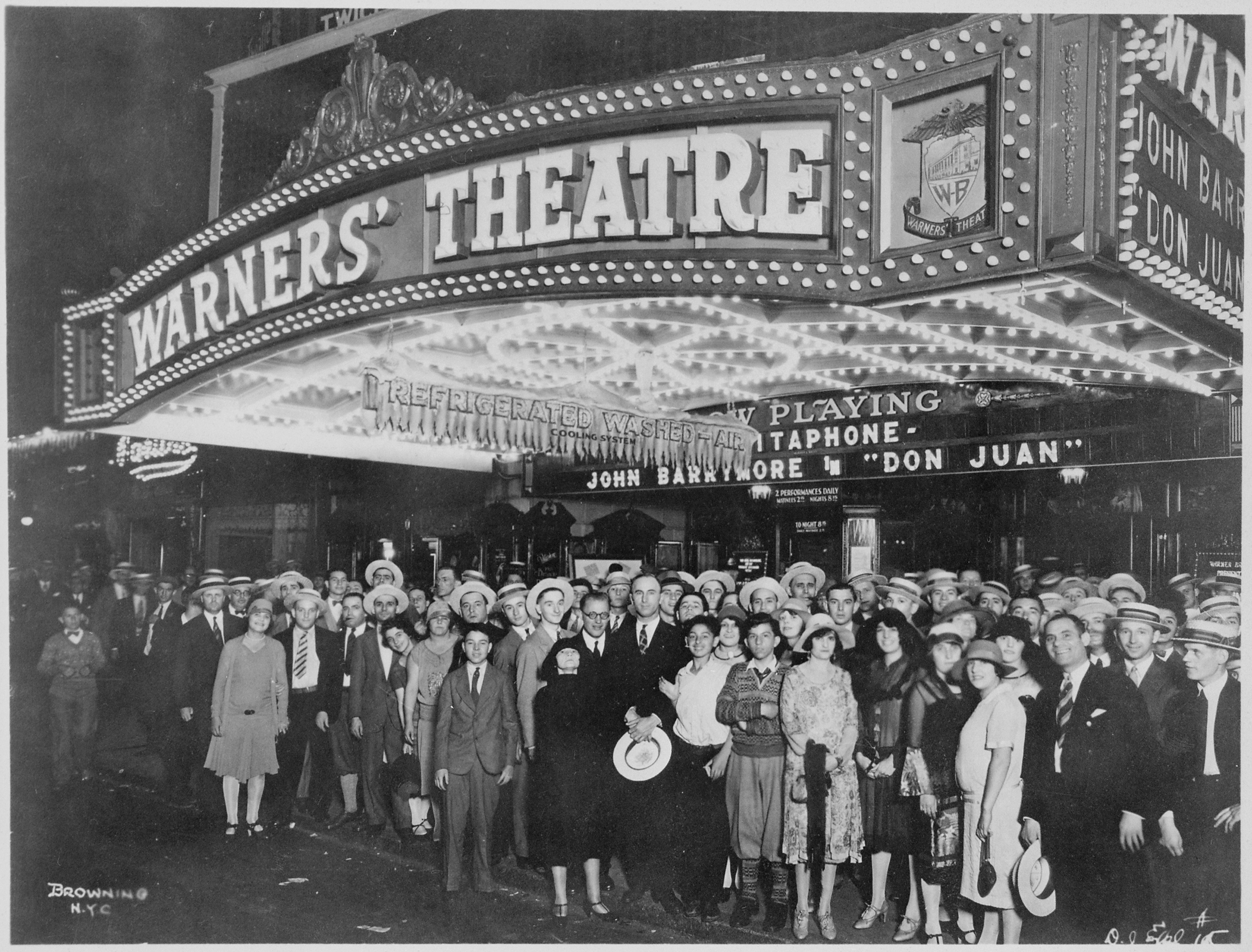
Don Juan premiered in New York City.

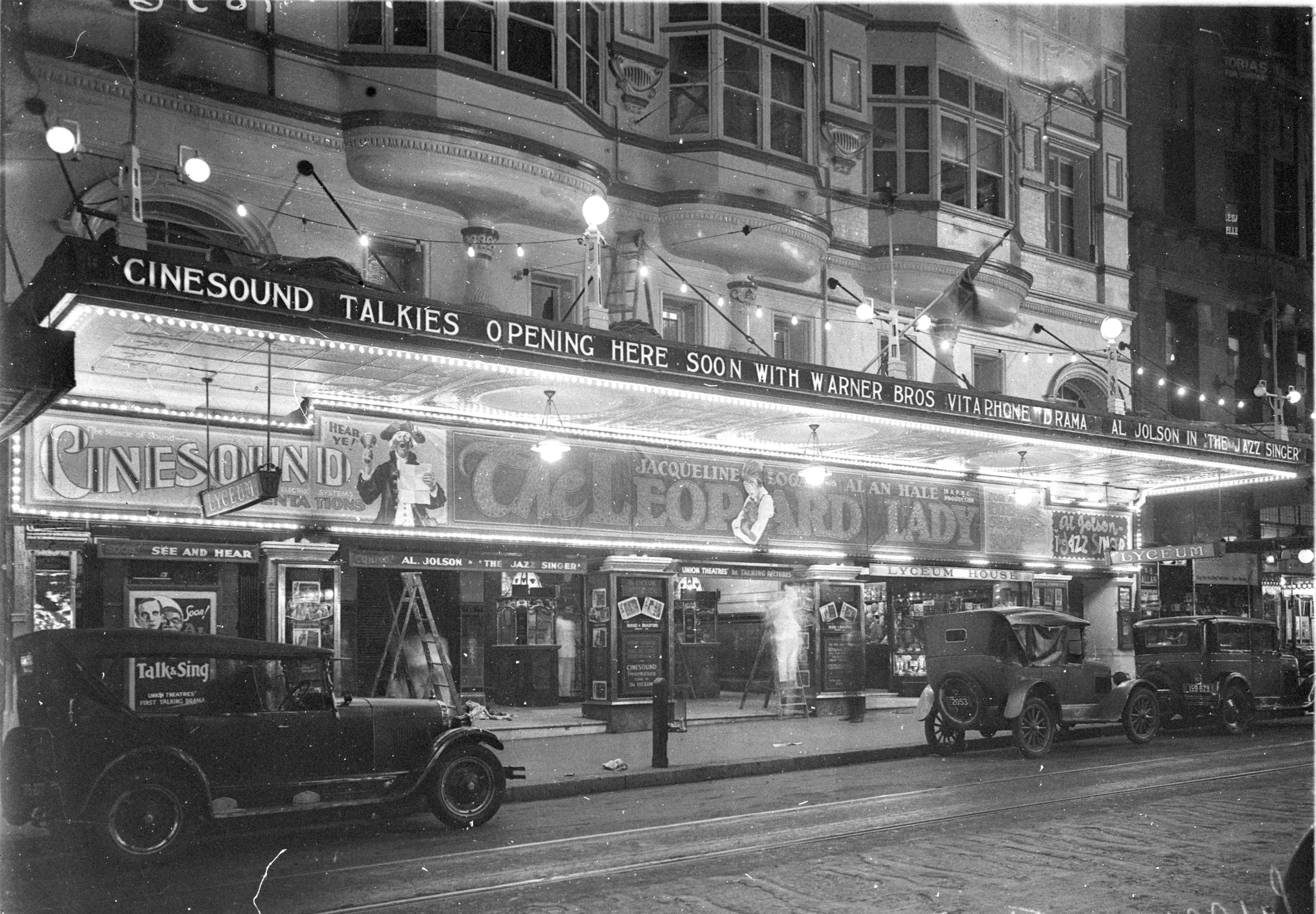
The Jazz Singer at Lyceum Theatre, Sydney 1928

In the early 1920s, Western Electric was developing both sound-on-film and sound-on-disc systems, aided by the purchase of Lee De Forest's Audion amplifier tube in 1913, consequent advances in public address systems, and the first practical condenser microphone, which Western Electric engineer E.C. Wente had created in 1916 and greatly improved in 1922. De Forest debuted his own Phonofilm sound-on-film system in New York City on April 15, 1923, but due to the relatively poor sound quality of Phonofilm and the impressive state-of-the-art sound heard in Western Electric's private demonstrations, the Warner Brothers decided to go forward with the industrial giant and the more familiar disc technology.

The business was established at Western Electric's Bell Laboratories in New York City and acquired by Warner Bros. in April 1925. Warner Bros. introduced Vitaphone on August 5, 1926, with the premiere of their silent feature Don Juan, which had been retrofitted with a symphonic musical score and sound effects. There was no spoken dialog. The feature was preceded by a program of short subjects with live-recorded sound, nearly all featuring classical instrumentalists and opera stars. The only "pop music" artist was guitarist Roy Smeck and the only actual "talkie" was the short film that opened the program, Introduction of Vitaphone Sound Pictures, four minutes of introductory remarks by motion picture industry spokesman Will Hays.

Don Juan was able to draw huge sums of money at the box office, but was not able to recoup the expenses Warner Bros. put into the film's production. After its financial failure, Paramount head Adolph Zukor offered Sam Warner a deal as an executive producer for Paramount if he brought Vitaphone with him. Sam, not wanting to take any more of Harry Warner's refusal to move forward with using sound in future Warner films, agreed to accept Zukor's offer, but the deal died after Paramount lost money in the wake of Rudolph Valentino's death. Harry eventually agreed to accept Sam's demands. Sam then pushed ahead with a new Vitaphone feature starring Al Jolson, the Broadway dynamo who had already scored a big hit with early Vitaphone audiences in A Plantation Act, a musical short released on October 7, 1926. On October 6, 1927, The Jazz Singer premiered at the Warner Theater in New York City, broke box-office records, established Warner Bros. as a major player in Hollywood, and is traditionally credited with single-handedly launching the talkie revolution.

Don Juan (1926)

At first, the production of Vitaphone shorts and the recording of orchestral scores were strictly a New York phenomenon, taking advantage of the bountiful supply of stage and concert hall talent there, but the Warners soon migrated some of this activity to their more spacious facilities on the West Coast. Dance band leader Henry Halstead is given credit for starring in the first Vitaphone short subject filmed in Hollywood instead of New York. Carnival Night in Paris (1927) featured the Henry Halstead Orchestra and a cast of hundreds of costumed dancers in a Carnival atmosphere.

== Process ==
From the perspective of the cast and crew on the sound stage, there was little difference between filming with Vitaphone and a sound-on-film system. In the early years of sound, the noisy cameras and their operators were enclosed in soundproofed booths with small windows made of thick glass. Cables suspended the microphones in fixed positions just above camera range, and sometimes they were hidden behind objects in the scene. The recording machines were usually located in a separate building to completely isolate them from sound stage floor vibrations and other undesirable influences. The audio signal was sent from an on-stage monitoring and control booth to the recording room over a heavy shielded cable. Synchronization was maintained by driving all the cameras and recorders with synchronous electric motors powered from a common source. When music and sound effects were being recorded to accompany existing film footage, the film was projected so that the conductor could synchronize the music with the visual cues and it was the projector, rather than a camera, that was electrically interlocked with the recording machine.

Except for the unusual disc size and speed, the physical record-making process was the same one employed by contemporary record companies to make smaller discs for home use. The recording lathe cut an audio-signal-modulated spiral groove into the polished surface of a thick round slab of wax-like material rotating on a turntable. The wax was much too soft to be played in the usual way, but a specially supported and guided pickup could be used to play it back immediately in order to detect any sound problems that might have gone unnoticed during the filming. If problems were found, the scene could then be re-shot while everything was still in place, minimizing additional expense. Even the lightest playback caused some damage to the wax master, so it was customary to employ two recorders and simultaneously record two waxes, one to play and the other to be sent for processing if that "take" of the scene was approved. At the processing plant, the surface of the wax was rendered electrically conductive and electroplated to produce a metal mold or "stamper" with a ridge instead of a groove, and this was used to press hard shellac discs from molten "biscuits" of the raw material.

Because of the universal desirability of an immediate playback capability, even studios using sound-on-film systems employed a wax disc "playback machine" in tandem with their film recorders, as it was impossible to play an optical recording until it had made the round trip to the film processing laboratory.

A Vitaphone-equipped theater had normal projectors which had been furnished with special phonograph turntables and pickups; a fader; an amplifier; and a loudspeaker system. The projectors operated just as motorized silent projectors did, but at a fixed speed of 24 frames per second and mechanically interlocked with the attached turntables. When each projector was threaded, the projectionist would align a start mark on the film with the film gate, then cue up the corresponding soundtrack disc on the turntable, being careful to place the phonograph needle at a point indicated by an arrow scribed on the record's surface. When the projector was started, it rotated the linked turntable and (in theory) automatically kept the record "in sync" (correctly synchronized) with the projected image.

The Voice From the Screen (1926), a film demonstrating the Vitaphone sound-on-disc process

The Vitaphone process made several improvements over previous systems:

- Amplification – The Vitaphone system used electronic amplification based on Lee De Forest's Audion tube. This allowed the sound to be played to a large audience at a comfortable volume. Vitaphone was far from the first sound film system to use this technology, but it had amplifiers and loudspeakers, developed by Western Electric, which were state-of-the-art. Their performance was greatly superior to anything else of the kind then available, including the equipment used by De Forest to present his own Phonofilm sound-on-film exhibitions.
- Fidelity – Contrary to conventional wisdom, neither Vitaphone's ability to fill a theater with an adequate volume of sound nor its success in maintaining synchronization was unprecedented. Léon Gaumont's sound-on-disc films, which were being shown twenty years earlier, were successfully synchronized by the use of electrically interlinked multi-pole synchronous motors, and a pneumatic amplification system more than sufficed to fill Gaumont's 3,400-seat flagship theater in Paris with the recorded sound. That sound, however, had to be recorded by the same insensitive non-electronic method introduced by Thomas Edison in 1877, or alternatively by a very crude microphone-based variant which had logistical advantages but did not offer improved fidelity. The resulting sound, however greatly amplified it might be, was tinny and unclear and speech was difficult to understand. The footsteps and other incidental sounds that audiences instinctively expected to hear were missing. It did not sound "natural".

The Vitaphone system derived from extensive work on electronically recording and reproducing sound that had been carried out at Western Electric during the first half of the 1920s. Western Electric's engineers had developed a highly sensitive full-frequency-range condenser microphone, capable of capturing a whisper from several feet away, along with the electronic and mechanical equipment necessary to adequately record the audio signal it produced. As a result, the quality of Vitaphone sound in the theater came as a revelation to the audience at its public debut in 1926. It easily and dramatically surpassed anything previously achieved. It even surpassed the sound quality of Western Electric's own sound-on-film system, developed concurrently with the sound-on-disc system but still in the laboratory at that time, because at first the discs yielded better fidelity than an optical sound track.

These innovations notwithstanding, the Vitaphone process lost the early format war with sound-on-film processes for many reasons:

- Distribution – Vitaphone records had to be distributed along with film prints, and shipping the records required a whole infrastructure apart from the already-existing film distribution system. The records would start to suffer from audible wear after an estimated 20 playings (a check box system on the label was used to keep count) and were then supposed to be replaced with a fresh set. Damage and breakage were inherent dangers, so a spare set of discs was usually kept on hand, further adding to the costs.
- Synchronization – Vitaphone was vulnerable to severe synchronization problems, famously spoofed in MGM's 1952 musical Singin' in the Rain. If a record were improperly cued up, it would start out of sync with the picture and the projectionist would have to try to manually acquire sync. If the wrong record had been cued up there was no realistic option but to pause the show for a few minutes while swapping in the correct disc, resetting everything and starting that reel again. If the film print became damaged and was not precisely repaired, the relationship between the record and the print would be thrown off, also causing a loss of sync. Vitaphone projectors had special levers and linkages to advance and retard sync, but only within certain limits. Scrupulous care and attention were demanded from the projectionist. In the absence of human error and the occasional malfunction that can befall any complicated machine, the Vitaphone system worked as intended, but when a problem did occur it could be an embarrassing disaster.
- Editing – A phonograph record cannot be physically edited, and this significantly limited the creative potential of Vitaphone films. Warner Bros. went to great expense to develop a highly complex phonograph-based dubbing system, using synchronous motors and Strowger switch-triggered playback phonographs. Multiple source discs would be carefully cued up, then parts of each in turn were dubbed to a new master disc. The cutting of the new wax master could not be paused, so each playback turntable had to be started at just the right moment and each signal switched to the recorder at just the right moment. The system worked, but imprecisely enough that the reel of film often required some adjustment, by adding or removing one or more film frames at imperfectly matched edit points, to conform it to the disc of edited sound. This discouraged frequent changes of scene in the film and the lively pace that they created. Editing sound on disc was a nightmare for the editor, and it was increasingly obvious to everyone that while the system sufficed for musical shorts and a synchronized musical accompaniment for otherwise silent films (the only applications originally planned), it was a clumsy way to make a feature-length film with "live" sound. By the middle of 1931, Warner Bros.-First National had thrown in the towel and was recording and editing optical sound on film, like all the other studios, and only then dubbing the completed soundtrack to discs for use with the Vitaphone projection system.
- Fidelity of Discs versus Sound-on-Film – The fidelity of sound-on-film processes was improved considerably after the early work by Lee De Forest on his Phonofilm system and that of his former associate Theodore Case on what eventually became the Fox Movietone system, introduced in 1927. The De Forest and Case-Fox systems used variable-density soundtracks, but the variable-area soundtrack used by RCA Photophone, introduced in 1928, eventually predominated. Although the fidelity of optical sound never quite caught up with ongoing improvements in disc recording technology, for practical purposes the early quality advantage of discs had been overcome within a few years.

Vitaphone was the market leader in the early days of talking pictures, for two key reasons. First, the new novelty was very popular with the public, with The Jazz Singer being a monster hit. It was in theater owners' best interest to compete as soon as possible. Second, a much more practical reason was the cost. Converting a silent-only theater to sound was much quicker and cheaper with the Vitaphone sound-on-disc system than it was with the Movietone sound-on-film system. Exhibitors with limited incomes opted for Vitaphone, particularly in smaller towns. The Vitaphone brand name became synonymous with talking pictures in general; as early as 1928, theater organists, thrown out of work when their bosses discontinued silent pictures, placed situation-wanted ads in trade papers with the melancholy phrase "Reason for leaving due to Vitaphone."

After the improvement of the competing sound-on-film systems, Vitaphone's disadvantages led to its retirement early in the sound era. Warner Bros. and First National stopped recording directly to disc and switched to RCA Photophone sound-on-film recording. Warner Bros. had to publicly concede that Vitaphone was being retired, but put a positive spin on it by announcing that Warner films would now be available in both sound-on-film and sound-on-disc versions. Thus, instead of making a grudging admission that its technology had become obsolete, Warner Bros. purported to be doing the entire movie industry a favor.

Despite the fact that Warner Bros. still used Vitaphone as a brand name, the soundtrack-disc era was largely over by 1931. Many theater owners, who had invested heavily in Vitaphone equipment only a short time before, were financially unable or unwilling to replace their sound-on-disc-only equipment. Their continuing need for discs compelled most Hollywood studios to prepare sets of soundtrack discs for their new films, made by dubbing from the optical soundtracks, and supply them as required. This practice continued, although on an ever-dwindling scale, through 1937.

== Vitaphone soundtrack discs ==
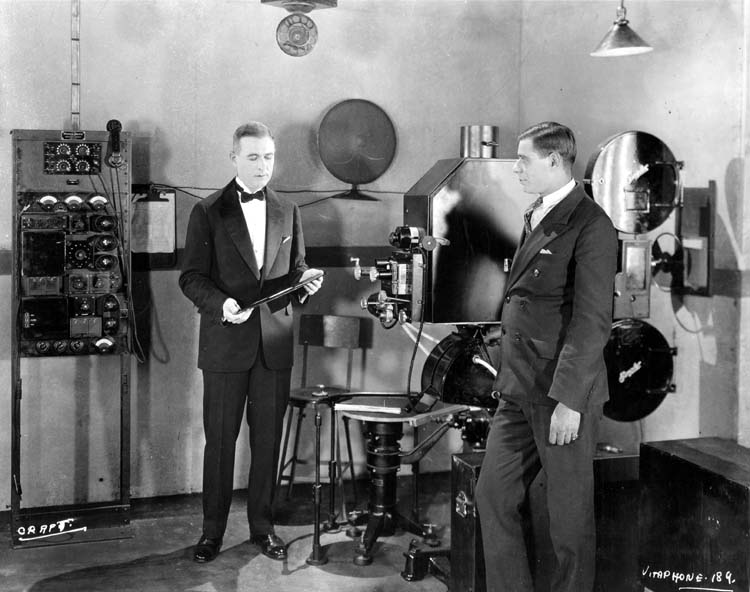
A Vitaphone projection system was demonstrated in 1926. Engineer E. B. Craft holds a soundtrack disc. The turntable, on a massive tripod base, is at lower center.

In 1924–1925, when Western Electric established the format of the system which would eventually be named Vitaphone, they settled on a 16-inch (41 cm) diameter disc rotating at 33 1/3 rpm as a good practical compromise of disc size and speed. The slow speed permitted the 11-minute playing time needed to match the maximum running time of a then-standard 1000 foot (300 meter) reel of film projected at 24 fps, yet the increased diameter preserved the average effective groove velocity, and therefore the sound quality, of a smaller, shorter-playing record rotating at the then-standard speed of about 78 rpm.

Like ordinary pre-vinyl records, Vitaphone discs were made of a shellac compound rendered lightly abrasive by its major constituent, finely pulverized rock. Such records were played with a very inexpensive, imprecisely mass-produced steel needle with a point that quickly wore to fit the contour of the groove, but then went on to wear out in the course of playing one disc side, after which it was meant to be discarded and replaced. Unlike ordinary records, Vitaphone discs were recorded inside out, so that the groove started near the synchronization arrow scribed in the blank area around the label and proceeded outward. During playback, the needle would therefore be fresh where the groove's undulations were most closely packed and needed the most accurate tracing, and suffering from wear only as the much more widely spaced and easily traced undulations toward the edge of the disc were encountered.

Initially, Vitaphone discs had a recording on one side only, each reel of film having its own disc. As the sound-on-disc method was slowly relegated to second-class status, cost-cutting changes were instituted, first by making use of both sides of each disc for non-consecutive reels of film, then by reducing the discs to 14 or 12 inches (36 or 30 cm) in diameter. The use of RCA Victor's new "Vitrolac", a lightweight, flexible, and less abrasive vinyl-based compound, made it possible to downsize the discs while actually improving their sound quality.

There were exceptions to the 16-inch (41 cm) standard size of 1920s Vitaphone discs. In the case of very short films, such as trailers and some of the earliest musical shorts, the recording, still cut at 33 1/3 rpm and working outward from a minimum diameter of about 7 1/2 inches (19 cm), was pressed on a 12-or-10-inch (30 or 25 cm) disc when the smaller size sufficed.

== Vitaphone shorts ==
Introduction to the Vitaphone sound-on-disc system by Will H. Hays (August 6, 1926)

Warners bought the Vitagraph studio in 1925 and used its Brooklyn, New York, facility for working out practical sound-film production techniques and filming musical shorts. The previously nameless Western Electric sound-on-disc system was named Vitaphone, deriving from the Warner-owned Vitagraph name.

Although Warners' sound feature films were made in Hollywood, most of the short subjects were made in Brooklyn, and Vitaphone shorts became a fixture in movie-theater programs through 1940. Many stage stars filmed their acts for posterity: Al Jolson, Burns and Allen, Rose Marie, Edgar Bergen, Bert Lahr, Fred Allen, Jack Benny, and many others. From the musical world came Mischa Elman, Frances Langford, Giovanni Martinelli, Xavier Cugat, Bill Robinson, Hal Le Roy, Lillian Roth, Ruth Etting, Ethel Merman, Abbe Lane, Helen Morgan, The Nicholas Brothers, Ozzie Nelson and Harriet Nelson, Jane Froman, Roger Wolfe Kahn, Judy Canova, Nina Mae McKinney, Ethel Waters, June Allyson, Lanny Ross, and Cyd Charisse.

Performers in Vitaphone shorts sometimes graduated to stardom, among them Humphrey Bogart, James Stewart, Spencer Tracy, Sammy Davis Jr., Sylvia Sidney, Pat O'Brien, Joan Blondell, Eleanor Powell, Betty Hutton, Milton Berle, and Phil Silvers.

Many familiar character players started at Vitaphone, including Helen Broderick, Allen Jenkins, Donald MacBride, Franklin Pangborn, Judith Anderson, Leo Carrillo, Marjorie Main, Lionel Stander, William Demarest, and Natalie Schafer. In addition, Vitaphone had its own stable of comedians who starred in one- and two-reel short subjects: Roscoe Arbuckle, Jack Haley, Shemp Howard, Joe Penner, Bob Hope, George Givot and Charles Judels, the Easy Aces (Goodman and Jane Ace), Ken Murray, El Brendel, Roscoe Ates, Henry Armetta, Harry Gribbon, Thelma White, Mr. and Mrs. Jack Norworth, and The Yacht Club Boys.

== The Vitaphone Project ==
In 1991, The Vitaphone Project was started by a group of five vintage record collectors and movie enthusiasts. Since the soundtrack discs and film prints of Vitaphone productions often became separated, The Vitaphone Project searches for original 16-inch soundtrack discs and mute film elements that go with surviving soundtrack discs. The Vitaphone Project borrows or purchases soundtrack discs from private collectors and often works with the restoration labs at the University of California at Los Angeles to create new 35mm preservation prints that combine the original picture and sound elements. The Vitaphone Project also often partners with the Library of Congress and the British Film Institute

As of December 2016, The Vitaphone Project had located about 6,500 soundtrack discs in private collections and helped preserve 125 films, 12 of which were feature-length films. They have also raised $400,000 in donations, with Hugh Hefner being a notable donor.

The Vitaphone Project has helped to restore films featuring such stars as Rose Marie and Al Jolson. They also worked with Warner Bros. to restore 1929's Why Be Good?, the final silent film made by Colleen Moore. Funding raised by The Vitaphone Project was used to restore 1928's The Beau Brummels, starring vaudeville comedy team Shaw and Lee, which was added to the National Film Registry in 2016.

Following the untimely death of Ron Hutchinson, a new project called the Vitaphone Soundtrack Project was initiated to carry on his work. This project is a non-profit effort to digitize soundtracks and films from the early sound period (1926-1931) and make them available freely online. The Vitaphone Soundtrack Project regularly publishes its digital restorations on YouTube for free public viewing, featuring recent synchronized sound reconstructions of rare early cinema titles including The Wedding March (1928), Adoration (1928), The Woman Disputed (1928), The Desert Song (1929), Isle Of Lost Ships (1929) [Silent Version], Redskin (1929), Mother's Boy (1929), and The Cat Creeps (1930).

== Vitaphone and Vitagraph brand names ==
Warner Bros. was careful to preserve the Vitaphone and Vitagraph brand names, just as it had preserved the First National brand name for its second-echelon feature films.

Vitaphone had made its reputation largely for its short subjects, so the Warner live-action shorts and animated cartoons were copyrighted by The Vitaphone Corporation until 1959 and marketed under the Vitaphone brand name.

The silent-era Vitagraph studio had ceased operations in 1925 when Warner Bros. absorbed it. In 1932, producer Leon Schlesinger made a very-low-budget series of six John Wayne western features, consisting largely of action scenes from silent Ken Maynard westerns. The Schlesinger features were so very cheap that Warner Bros. wouldn't put its own name on them, or even the First National name. They were released under the Vitagraph name, which Warner still owned.

Warner Bros. stopped making live-action short subjects in 1956, and The Vitaphone Corporation was officially dissolved at the end of 1959. Warner then used the brand names for various purposes, to keep them active legally. In the 1950s, the Warner Bros. record label boasted "Vitaphonic" high-fidelity recording. In the 1960s, the end titles of Merrie Melodies cartoons (beginning with 1960's From Hare to Heir) carried the legend "A Vitaphone Release". Looney Tunes of the same period (beginning with that same year's Hopalong Casualty) were credited as "A Vitagraph Release". By late 1968, the Vitaphone/Vitagraph titles had become interchangeable between the Looney Tunes and Merrie Melodies series titles.

== Legacy ==
The Jazz Singer (1927)

Vitaphone was among the first 25 inductees into the TECnology Hall of Fame at its establishment in 2004, an honor given to "products and innovations that have had an enduring impact on the development of audio technology." The award notes that Vitaphone, though short-lived, helped in popularizing theater sound and was critical in stimulating the development of the modern sound reinforcement system.

Though operating on principles so different as to make it unrecognizable to a Vitaphone engineer, DTS is a sound-on-disc system, the first to gain wide adoption since Vitaphone was abandoned.

== See also ==
- List of film formats
- List of early sound feature films (1926–1929)
- Movietone
- Phonofilm
- Photokinema
- RCA Photophone
- Sound film
- Sound-on-film
- Vitagraph Studios
- Vitaphone Varieties
