= Prehistoric Women (1950 film) =

1950 film by Gregg G. Tallas

- Directed by: Gregg G. Tallas
- Written by: Sam X. Abarbanel; Gregg G. Tallas
- Produced by: Sam X. Abarbanel; Albert J. Cohen
- Starring: Laurette Luez; Allan Nixon; Mara Lynn
- Cinematography: Lionel Lindon
- Edited by: James Graham
- Music by: Raoul Kraushaar
- Production company: Alliance Productions
- Distributed by: Eagle-Lion Films
- Release date: November 1, 1950 (United States)
- Running time: 74 minutes
- Country: United States
- Language: English
- Budget: $200,000
- Box office: $1 million

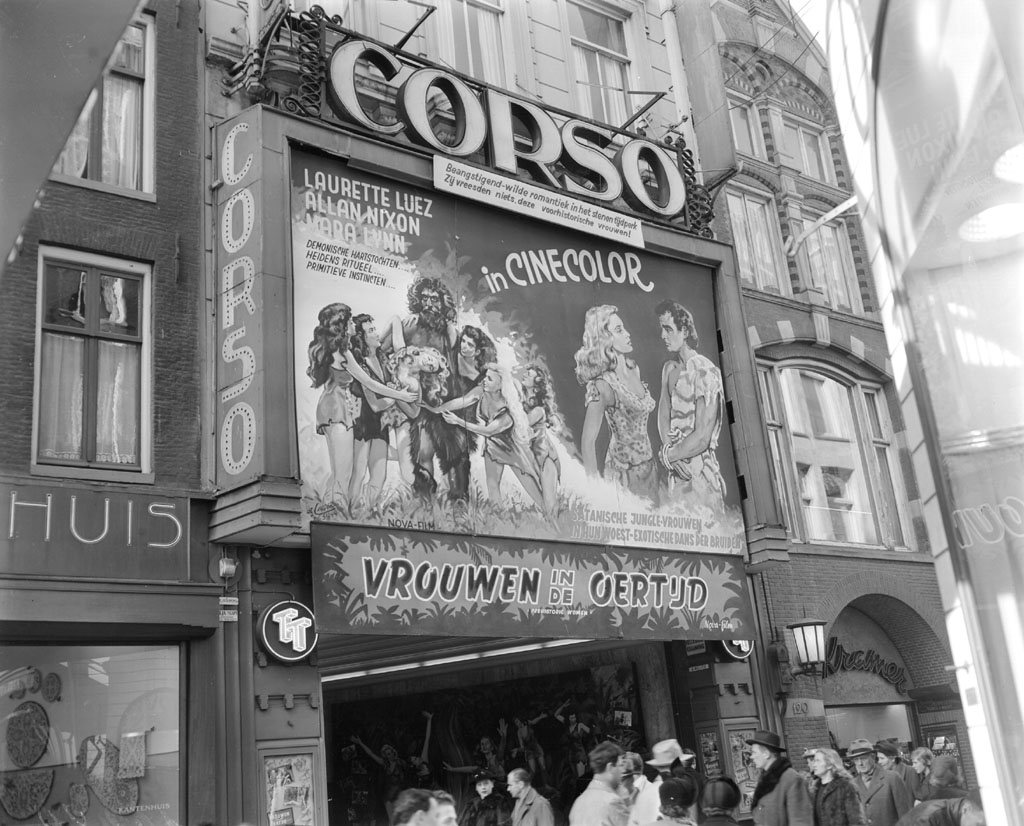
Prehistoric Women theatrical poster at the Corso cinema (Amsterdam), 1952

Prehistoric Women is a 1950 American low-budget fantasy adventure film written and directed by Gregg G. Tallas and starring Laurette Luez, Allan Nixon, Joan Shawlee, Judy Landon and Mara Lynn. Released by Alliance Productions, the independent film was also titled The Virgin Goddess. The film was later distributed in the United States as a double feature with Man Beast.

== Plot ==
Tigri and her Stone Age female friends hate all men. However, she and her Amazon tribe see men as a necessary evil and capture them as potential husbands. Engor, who is smarter than the rest of the men, is able to escape them. He discovers fire and battles enormous beasts. After he is recaptured by the women, he uses fire to repel a dragon-like creature. The women are impressed with him, including their prehistoric queen. Engor marries Tigri and they begin a new, more civilized tribe.

== Cast ==
- Laurette Luez as Tigri
- Allan Nixon as Engor
- Mara Lynn as Arva
- Joan Shawlee as Lotee
- Judy Landon as Eras
- Jo-Carroll Dennison as Nika

== See also ==
- 1950 in film
- One Million B.C., a 1940 film with which Prehistoric Women bears various resemblances
- Prehistoric Women can also somewhat be seen as a spiritual predecessor to the 1967 film of the same name (sometimes known as Slave Girls) starring Martine Beswick, although the two are otherwise unrelated.
