= The Neanderthal Man =

1953 film by Ewald André Dupont

- Directed by: Ewald André Dupont
- Written by: Aubrey Wisberg; Jack Pollexfen
- Produced by: Ilse Lahn; Jack Pollexfen; Aubrey Wisberg; Edward Small (uncredited)
- Starring: Robert Shayne; Joyce Terry; Richard Crane; Doris Merrick; Beverly Garland; Tandra Quinn
- Cinematography: Stanley Cortez
- Edited by: Fred R. Feitshans Jr.
- Music by: Albert Glasser
- Color process: Black and white
- Production company: Global Productions Inc.
- Distributed by: United Artists
- Release date: June 19, 1953
- Running time: 78 minutes
- Country: United States
- Language: English

The Neanderthal Man is a 1953 American science fiction horror film produced independently by Aubrey Wisberg and Jack Pollexfen, as Global Productions Inc., from their own original screenplay.

It starred Robert Shayne, Richard Crane and Joyce Terry, was directed by E. A. Dupont, and was originally distributed in the United States by United Artists Corp. Beverly Garland, in a supporting role, appears here in her first feature film under her new stage name (previously she went by the name of Beverly Campbell and made her screen debut as a supporting actor in the 1949 film noir classic D.O.A.).

== Plot ==
At home in California's High Sierras, Prof. Clifford Groves hears glass breaking and looks up in fear from his book, Neanderthal Man and the Stone Age. He finds his lab window smashed and the room wrecked. The noise awakens his adult daughter Jan. Groves sends her back to bed.

Meanwhile, Mr. Wheeler spots an unusually large tiger while hunting. That night at Webb's Cafe, the locals tease him. "Three times the size of a mountain lion and got the tusks the size of an elephant- it ain't natural," says Danny. Game Warden George Oakes comes in. Wheeler leaves, and Charlie Webb tells him Wheeler's story. Driving home, a sabretooth tiger jumps onto Oakes' car. He scares it off by honking the car's horn.

Oakes and Sheriff Andy Andrews make plaster casts of the animal's footprints. Oakes takes one to Dr. Ross Harkness in Los Angeles. Oakes eventually convinces Harkness that the cast is real. Harkness says he will drive up that weekend to investigate.

When Harkness stops at Webb's, waitress Nola Mason introduces him to Ruth Marshall, who is on her way to see her fiancé, Groves, but is stranded because her car has broken down. Harkness drives her to Groves's house, where Jan tells them that Groves is in LA speaking before the Naturalist's Club.

Groves lectures the club on his theory that Neanderthal man was more intelligent than "modern man" because Neanderthals had bigger brains. The club members scoff at him and demand proof. Groves responds with insults. The chairman adjourns the meeting, telling Groves not to return. Groves angrily says to the empty room that he will show them proof if that is what they want.

Jan invites Harkness to stay at their house. Groves complains about Harkness being there at breakfast, but Ruth insists that he remain. Oakes arrives, and he and Harkness head out to look for the sabretooth. They find it and kill it, but Harkness says he fears there are others.

Back at the lab, Ruth and Groves quarrel about their deteriorating relationship. He throws her out, then injects himself with the serum he has been using to turn cats into sabretooth tigers. He reverts to the Neanderthal Man. Out in the woods, he kills hunter Jim Newcomb and his dog, then returns home and becomes Groves again. He writes in his diary that this most recent regression was the fastest yet, and the recovery was the slowest. Then he turns into the Neanderthal Man and runs off. Harkness sneaks into Groves's lab and finds photos that Groves took as he experimentally regressed Celia, his deaf-mute maid.

Buck Hastings and Nola go on a picnic, and he snaps glamour shots of her. But the Neanderthal Man kills him while Nola is behind a bush changing clothes. As she looks at Buck, dead on the ground, the Neanderthal Man carries her off, kicking and screaming.

Oakes phones Jan and says Buck has been murdered. During the call, Celia sees Nola outside. Harkness carries Nola in. She is hysterical and her clothes are torn. Buck, she says, was killed by something "not human." Then she cries, "He tried to pull me by my hair and then he ... then he ..." and collapses into tears, wailing. Jan calls Webb's, tells Webb what happened and asks him to send for the local MD, Dr. Fairchild.

Harkness shows Jan and Celia the photos of Celia being regressed to a Neanderthal Woman. Celia signs that she has no memory of it. Harkness then notices that one of the lab cats starts to yowl whenever it sees a syringe. When he injects it, it turns into a sabretooth and escapes.

Jan and Harkness read Groves' diary. He wrote that the serum works on cats, not dogs, and not fully on women but on men. They set out to find the Neanderthal Man before the State Police and Sheriff's posse can. They stop at Webb's and see that the Neanderthal Man has injured Webb. Jan says that Ruth's door has been smashed in and that she's gone. "I reckon he got her, too," says a dazed Webb.

Dr. Fairchild tells Harkness and Jan that the posse has cornered the Neanderthal Man in a cave, and Ruth is with him. Alone and unarmed, Harkness walks to the cave and tells Ruth to let the Neanderthal Man run away. He does, but a sabretooth tiger jumps him. The posse holds off shooting for a while as the Neanderthal Man is being mauled.

Now at home on his deathbed, the Neanderthal Man changes back to Groves one final time and utters his last words: "Better ... this ...way."

== Cast ==
Listed in this order in the opening credits:

- Robert Shayne as Prof. Clifford Groves (listed as "Shane" in the credits)
- Joyce Terry as Jan Groves (listed as "Joy" in the credits)
- Richard Crane as Dr. Ross Harkness
- Doris Merrick as Ruth Marshall
- Robert Long as George Oakes
- Jeanette Quinn as Celia
- Lee Morgan as Charlie Webb
- Beverly Garland as Nola Mason
- Dick Rich as Sheriff Andy Andrews
- Robert Easton as Danny
- Anthony Jochim as naturalist at conference
- Marshall Bradford as naturalist conference chair

Uncredited:

- Eric Colmar as Buck Hastings
- Frank Gerstle as Mr. Wheeler
- William Fawcett as Dr. Fairchild
- Robert Bray as Jim Newcomb
- Hank Mann as naturalist
- Crane Whitney as State Police Chief
- Tom Monroe as unnamed man
- Wally Rose as the Neanderthal Man

== Release ==
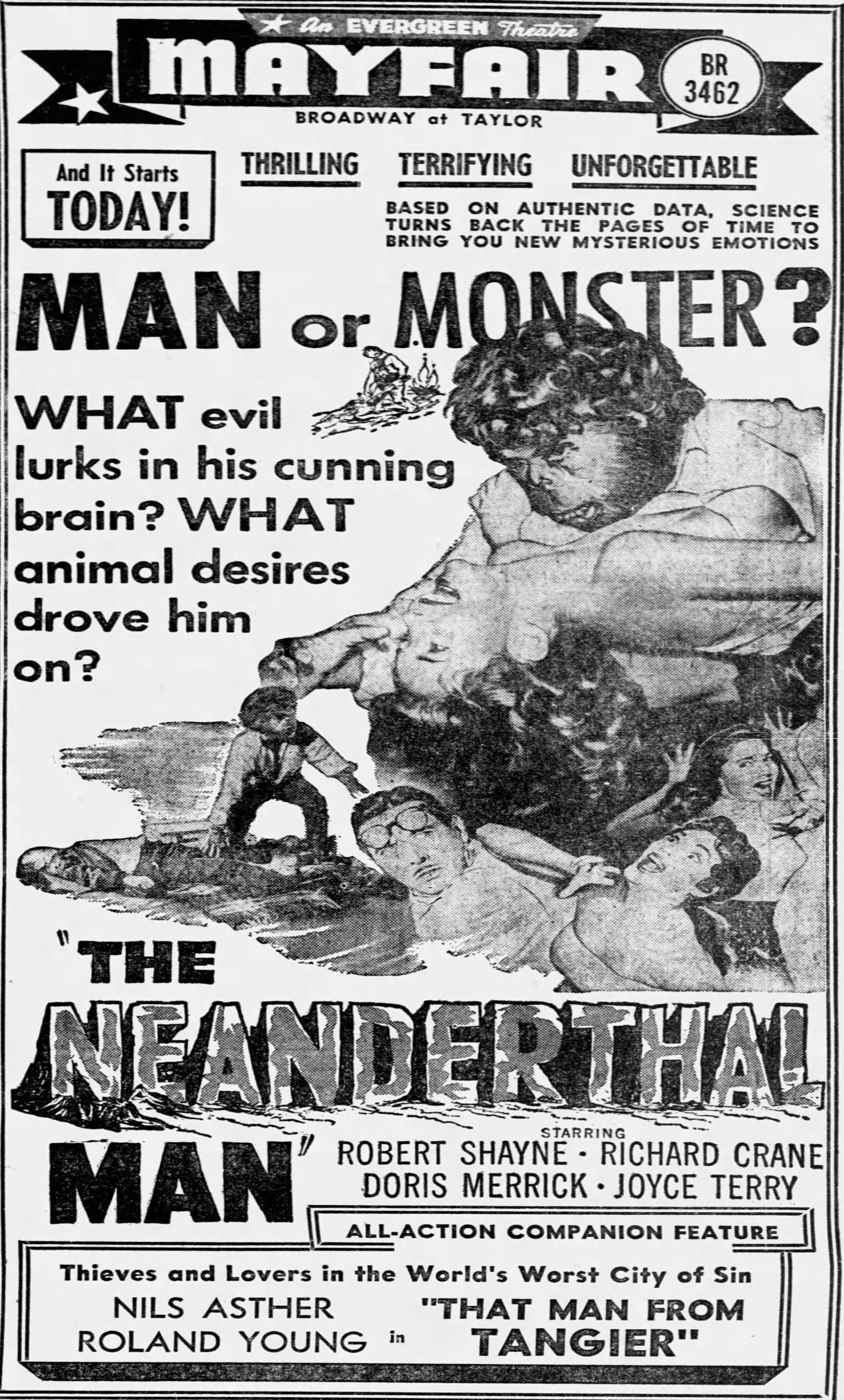
Theatrical advertisement from 1953

The film was theatrically released in the United States on 19 June 1953.

== Production ==
The film's working title was Madagascar. Production began in early December 1952 at Eagle-Lion Studios in Los Angeles.

Jack Pollifaxen recalled that their experienced director Ewald André Dupont was hired due to Aubrey Wisburg's and Pollifaxen's previous collaborator Edgar G. Ulmer being in Europe at the time of production. Pollifaxen also recalled that the actual Siberian tiger kept spitting out the imitation sabre teeth so close-up shots were done with the sabre teeth attached to a tiger skin rug. Stuntman Wally Rose was the man in the Neanderthal Man mask, not Robert Shayne.

The film was released in the USA on 19 June 1953 and in Spain and Brazil at unknown dates. Three minutes was trimmed from its running time when it opened in the UK, reducing time from 78 minutes to 75 minutes.

== Reception ==
The pressbook for the movie suggested ways theater owners could bring in the audience. One idea was to "make oversize footprint stencil and paint them on sidewalks of street leading to box-office", while another was to "dress up a man in costume to simulate the 'half man-half beast' in the picture ... Use as a ballyhoo stunt in front of your theatre or in your lobby. Can also be mounted on flat top truck and sent around town as a street bally."

The Neanderthal Man was not well received by critics in 1953, when it was mentioned at all. According to the "Review Digest" in the 1 August 1953 issue of BoxOffice magazine, the movie was rated "fair" by Film Daily, Harrison's Reports and BoxOffice itself. The Hollywood Reporter rated it as "very poor." The movie had not been reviewed by Variety, Parents' Magazine and The New York Daily News some six weeks after its release. In BoxOffice's "Feature Review", the anonymous reviewer wrote that "the film lends itself particularly on midnight 'spook show' programs." The reviewer went on to say that it "should qualify for duty as a supporting attraction in most bookings" and that the "picture can be played with an assurance of adequate acceptance." Deborah Del Vecchio quotes The Hollywood Reporter review, which calls the film "an overlong, dull conversation piece."

Many later reviewers called the movie "a variation of the Jekyll and Hyde theme", often adding the words "uninteresting" and "clichéd" to the description. Bill Warren says the film has "almost nothing to recommend it." Academic Michael Klossner refers to it as a "clichéd, Jekyll/Hyde rip-off", but notes favorably "the beautiful mountain settings, the colorful rustics and [Stanley] Cortez's sharp b&w photography."

The Neanderthal Man mask was frequently commented upon. Ken Hanke says it was "an appalling over-the-head mask (with stylishly wavy hair) that looks exactly like what it is." Phil Hardy notes that the mask "didn't flex with [Wally Rose's] facial movements." Warren, as well, points out that "the elaborate ... mask doesn't move or flex with the performer's face, and the eyes seem to be painted on." He adds that "the makeup/mask also varies throughout the film, as if different artists worked each day."

Author and film critic Leonard Maltin awarded the film one and a half out of four stars, calling it "Colorless and cheap".

General comments about The Neanderthal Man covered everything from direction to its overall quality as a film. Hanke calls it "a film that might be described as being scraped off the bottom of the barrel. That, of course, means the movie is like catnip to lovers of Bad Cinema", although adding that it is a "very low-rent production that is indefensible on every level." Nonetheless, Hanke rated the movie as 3 stars out of 5 and included it in "The Thursday Night Horror Picture Show" series, which he hosted. It ran on 4 September 2014 in the Carolina Asheville movie theater in Asheville, North Carolina."

"It was unquestionably a cheap and rapidly made film", writes Warren, "and Dupont brought none of the inventiveness to it that other directors who worked on equally shaky conditions applied to their films. The picture is unimaginative, dull and ponderous ...." Similarly, Hardy says that "DuPont, a minor talent in the best of circumstance, could bring no innovation" to the "clichéd" script. And the reviewing division of the Catholic News Service for the United States Council of Catholic Bishops called The Neanderthal Man a "horror clunker" with "stylized violence and hokey menace." USCCB rated it "A-II", acceptable for "adults and adolescents", but not children.

Klossner points to the many scientific inaccuracies in the film. He writes that "perhaps no film has expressed the horror and contempt too many people feel about primitive man as much as Neanderthal Man" and says "when Groves becomes a Neanderthal, he is a savage killer with a (completely inaccurate) apelike face and long claws." Warren agrees, noting that the Neanderthal Man "doesn't look like any reconstruction of a Neanderthal man that I've ever seen; furthermore, the creature we see behaves more like a vicious ape-man monster than the Neanderthals, who were probably not much different from Homo sapiens in general behavior."

The film also includes a sequence that Warren calls "very unusual for the period." As Nola describes her ordeal after being carried off by the Neanderthal Man, who has just murdered Buck at their picnic, her torn clothing and hysterical demeanor suggests that "the movie is clearly implying rape."
