= Untamed Mistress =

- Theatrical release poster
- Directed by: Ron Ormond; Allan Nixon
- Written by: Orville H. Hampton; Ron Ormond; Paul Leslie Peil
- Produced by: June Carr; Ron Ormond
- Starring: Jacqueline Fontaine; Allan Nixon; Cliff Taylor; Byron Keith; Carol Varga; Don C. Harvey; Jack Reitzen; Nelson Leigh; F.E. Miller; James Adamson
- Cinematography: Alan Stensvold
- Edited by: Igo Kantor; Hugh Winn
- Music by: Walter Greene
- Production company: Howco Productions
- Distributed by: Sinister Cinema; Joseph Brenner Associates; Nashville Cinema Partners
- Release date: June 17, 1953
- Running time: 70 minutes
- Country: United States
- Language: English

Untamed Mistress is an American film directed by Ron Ormond and starring Jacqueline Fontaine, Allan Nixon, Cliff Taylor, Byron Keith, and Carol Varga.

== Plot ==
Deep in the Indian jungles, two gentlemen are searching for a beautiful woman, Velda, who was kidnapped by a group of bloodthirsty gorillas. Eventually, they finally find her, but the gorillas are determined to keep the woman within their tribe.

== Cast ==
- Allan Nixon as Arthur
- Jacqueline Fontaine as Velda
- Byron Keith as Maharajah Parsta
- John Martin as Jack
- Cliff Taylor as Cyril
- Carol Varga as Rani, the serving girl
- Rick Vallin as Henchman
- Nelson Leigh as The Holy Man
- Don C. Harvey as Kurran the Hunter
- Jack Reitzen as Rajan, Rani's father
- F.E. Miller as Comedian

== Critical response ==
Writing in AllMovie, critic Robert Firsching described the film as "jungle exploitation" that "consists of real and staged documentary footage, all the better to display numerous topless native women (many of them clearly American) and 'thrilling' wild animal scenes," that "a great deal of the footage was taken from other films," and "there are many people jumping around in gorilla costumes."

== See also ==
- Ingagi (1930 exploitation film with similar premise)
