= The Beau Brummels (film) =

1928 film

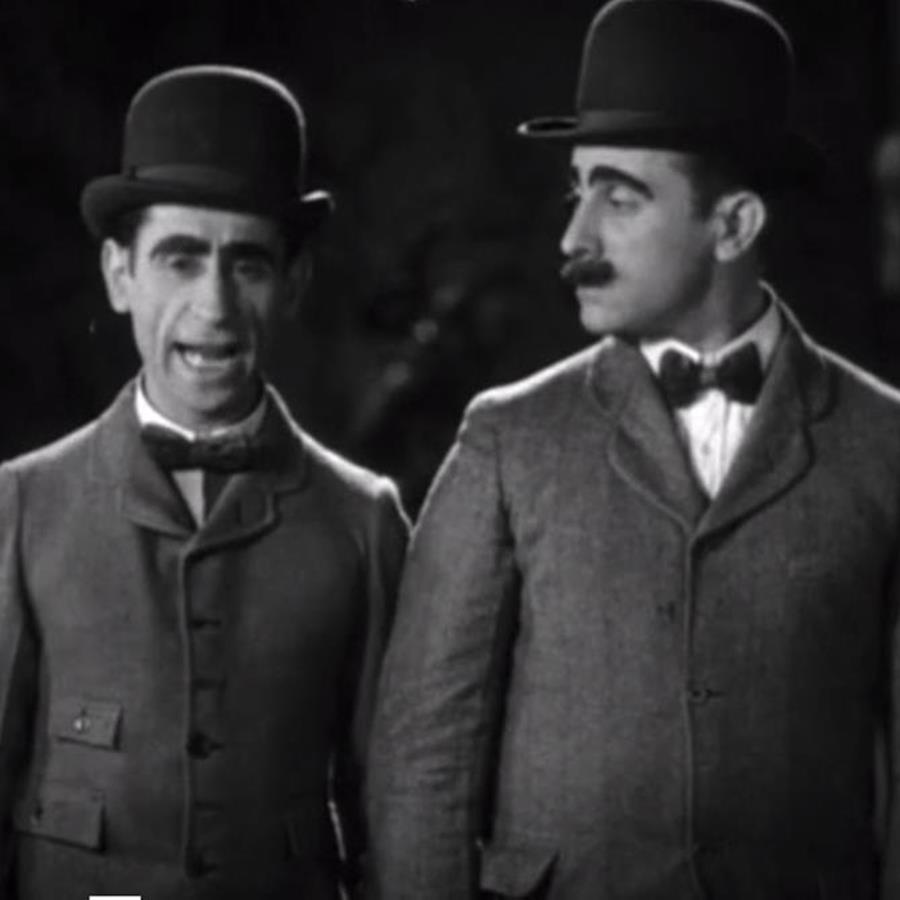
- Shaw & Lee in The Beau Brummels
- Starring: Al Shaw; Sam Lee (as Shaw & Lee)
- Production companies: Warner Brothers; Vitaphone
- Distributed by: Warner Bros. Pictures
- Release date: September 22, 1928
- Running time: 9 minutes
- Country: United States
- Languages: English, with Yiddish phrases

The Beau Brummels is a 1928 Vitaphone short film (Release 2686) featuring the vaudeville comedy-and-dancing team Shaw and Lee, Al Shaw (Albert Schutzman, 1891–1957) and Sam Lee (Samuel Levy, 1891–1980). It was the first film the team made together.

== Shaw and Lee's act ==
The Beau Brummels (1928)

The Beau Brummels has no storyline and no supporting cast. The film opens with curtains parting to reveal Shaw and Lee standing next to each other wearing matching suits, bow ties, and hats. The comedians' manner is solemn and their expressions are deadpan as they sing nonsense songs and recite ridiculous jokes.

They begin by performing a parody of the song "Strolling Through the Park One Day," in which they describe a woman with crossed eyes, knock-knees, flat feet, and a wig that's turning gray, before briefly singing in Yiddish. Then they slowly remove their hats, sing a song a capella, "Don't Forget to Breathe or Else You'll Die" giving advice ("Always eat when you are hungry, always drink when you are dry, go to bed when you are sleepy, but don't forget to breathe or else you'll die."), and slowly replace their hats.

Shaw and Lee then exchange groan-worthy jokes:

Lee: Twenty people under one umbrella. Not one got wet.
Shaw: How's that?
Lee: It wasn't raining.

Lee: Around this house we have a porch. On this porch we keep 30,000 geese.
Shaw: Thirty thousand geese on your porch?
Lee: On my porch.
Shaw: They must be Porch-a-geese.

The film ends with the team singing a self-referential song ("This Is the Chorus"), then break into a brief dance routine performed without background music.

Throughout the film, Shaw and Lee stand still and face the camera. Aside from the brief dance number at the end, taking off and replacing their hats, and bowing to the audience in the film's final moments, they only move to give each other confused looks.

== Reception ==
Shaw and Lee had performed this same act in vaudeville as early as 1922. By 1928 they had perfected both the routine and the timing, resulting in a faultless, one-take performance for the camera. Shaw and Lee do their act in a single, continuous eight-minute medium shot, except for a long shot at the very beginning and very end. Film Daily noted the team's trademark corny jokes and crazy dancing: "They get away with it because they know how to put it over [with] snap and perfect delivery."

== Recognition ==
The Vitaphone Project helped develop funding for a restoration of The Beau Brummels by the UCLA Film and Television Archive. The restoration, combining the surviving mute picture element and the original soundtrack recording, premiered theatrically in 2007 and was released on DVD that same year, introducing Shaw and Lee to modern audiences. The film and the team caught on quickly among vintage-film buffs, and in 2016, the film was selected for preservation in the National Film Registry by the Library of Congress, deemed "culturally, historically, or aesthetically significant."

The Beau Brummels was included with other Vitaphone shorts as part of the 2007 DVD and the 2013 blu-ray releases of The Jazz Singer. A restored print of The Beau Brummels was screened at the Turner Classic Movies Classic Film Festival in 2016.
