= Mesa of Lost Women =

1953 film by Ron Ormond

- Theatrical release poster
- Directed by: Herbert Tevos; and Ron Ormond
- Written by: Herbert Tevos
- Produced by: G. William Perkins; and Melvin Gordon
- Starring: Jackie Coogan; Richard Travis; Allan Nixon; Lyle Talbot; Mary Hill; Robert Knapp; Tandra Quinn (the Tarantula Girl); Chris Pin Martin; Samuel Wu
- Narrated by: Lyle Talbot
- Cinematography: Karl Struss, A.S.C.; Gil Warrenton, A.S.C.
- Edited by: Hugh Winn, A.C.E.; Ray H. Lockert; W. Donn Hayes, A.C.E. (supervising editor)
- Music by: Hoyt S. Curtin
- Production company: A Ron Ormond Production
- Distributed by: Howco Productions, Inc.
- Release date: June 17, 1953
- Running time: 70 minutes
- Country: United States
- Language: English

Mesa of Lost Women is a 1953 American low-budget black-and-white science fiction horror film directed by Herbert Tevos and Ron Ormond from a screenplay and original story created by Tevos and Orville H. Hampton, who is given on-screen credit only for dialogue supervision. Critical response to the film was overwhelmingly negative.

== Plot ==
Feminine hands with huge, spider-like claws caress "Doc" Tucker. The hands belong to spider woman Tarantella and a brief kiss between her and Tucker ends with his lifeless body collapsing. A disembodied voice asks the audience: "Have you ever been kissed by a girl like this?"

American oil surveyor Frank and his Mexican assistant Pepe find Grant Phillips and Doreen wandering the Muerto Desert on the US–Mexico border, suffering from extreme dehydration and exposure, and take them to an oil company field hospital. As he begins to recover, Phillips feverishly asks for an oil truck expedition needed to destroy by fire "super bugs" from a secret underground laboratory on the isolated Zarpa Mesa. As he begins to tell his story from the beginning to Frank, Pepe, "Doc" Tucker and foreman Dan Mulcahey, a narrator speaks over him and shifts focus to his rescuer, Pepe, drawing attention to what the Mexicans know but the Americans would not believe.

A flashback to a year earlier shows famous scientist Leland Masterson arrive at Zarpa Mesa at the invitation of the reclusive Dr. Aranya (pronounced as araña, the Spanish word for 'spider'), whose brilliant theories have intrigued Masterson. Aranya reveals his successful experimentation with growth hormones, creating human-sized tarantulas he can control telepathically and human women with the abilities and instincts of spiders. His creation Tarantella can regenerate severed limbs and Aranya expects her to have a lifespan of several centuries. However, his experiments on male subjects have resulted in dwarfism akin to drone insects. His end goal is to create spiders with human intellect, subject to his will, to control the world. Asked to assist, Masterson instead denounces Aranya's work as evil and blasphemous. In response, Tarantella injects him with a drug that turns him into a simpleton. Following experimentation, Masterson is found wandering the desert and placed in a lunatic asylum from which he eventually escapes.

Masterson arrives in a lively bar on the border where businessman Jan van Croft and his fiancée Doreen find themselves when their private aircraft breaks down. Masterson joins the couple, and Tarantella performs a dance, mesmerizing everyone present – except for George, a nurse from the asylum who has come to collect Masterson. Masterson recognized Tarantella as evil and shoots her, then takes Jan, Doreen, and George hostage. They arrive at Jan's aircraft where pilot Grant Phillips and servant Wu are added to the hostages. Masterson forces them all to depart despite the aircraft's disrepair. Meanwhile, Tarantella regenerates following her apparent death and leaves the bar.

Grant discovers that the compass is reading incorrectly and, due to an engine failure, they crash-land on Zarpa Mesa. George is killed while exploring and Jan wounded. Grant and Doreen grow closer during the night. Jan sends Wu on a dangerous errand, allowing Wu to report to Aranya, having sabotaged the airplane in order to return Masterson; no longer needed, Wu is killed by the spider women. Blamed for Wu's death, Jan has a mental breakdown and is killed by a giant spider. The others are captured and Aranya restores Masterson's intellect, requiring his help. Grant and Doreen restrain Aranya and Tarantella, allowing Masterson to concoct an explosive in the laboratory. After Grant and Doreen escape, Masterson incinerates the laboratory, along with himself, Aranya and Aranya's monsters.

At the field hospital, Grant fails to convince anyone but Pepe of the truth of his story. It is revealed that at least one (Delores Fuller) of Aranya's spider-women has survived.

== Cast ==
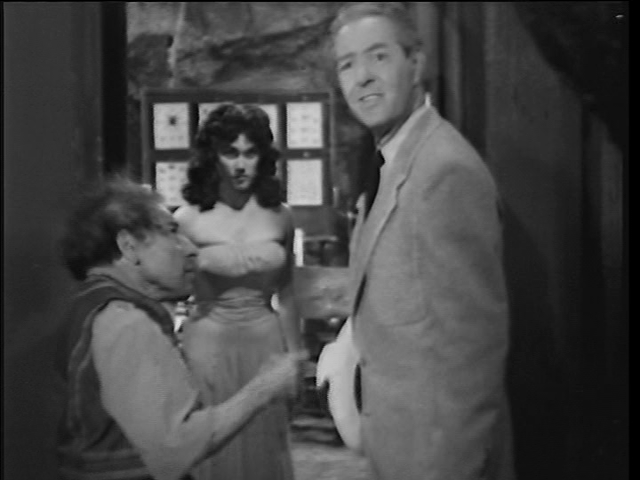
L-R: John George, Tandra Quinn, and Harmon Stevens

=== Opening credits ===
- Jackie Coogan
- Allan Nixon
- Richard Travis
- Narrated by Lyle Talbot
- Mary Hill
- Robert Knapp
- Tandra Quinn
- Chris Pin Martin
- Harmon Stevens
- Nico Lek
- Kelly Drake
- John Martin
- George Burrows
- Candy Collins
- Delores Fuller
- Dean Reisner
- Doris Lee Price
- Mona McKinnon
- Sherry Moreland
- Ginger Sherry
- Chris Randall
- Dianne Fortier
- Karna Greene
- June Benbow
- Katina Vea
- Fred Kelsey

=== End credits ===
- Jackie Coogan as Doctor Aranya
- Richard Travis as Dan Mulcahey
- Allan Nixon as "Doc" Tucker
- Mary Hill as Doreen
- Robert Knapp as Grant Phillips
- Chris Pin Martin as Pepe
- Harmon Stevens as Masterson
- Nico Lek as Van Croft
- Samuel Wu as Wu
- John Martin as Frank
- and Tandra Quinn as Tarantella

Uncredited (in order of appearance)
John George	Aranya's dwarf servant
Angelo Rossitto	dwarf assistant in Aranya's laboratory
Julian Rivero	patron in cantina where Tarantella performs her dance
Suzanne Ridgeway	girl in cantina where Tarantella performs her dance
Margia Dean	Brunette girl in Aranya's laboratory

== Production ==
An early version of the film titled Tarantula was viewed and granted a Motion Picture Production Code seal in October 1951. Its director, Herbert Tevos (born Herbert Schoellenbach), reportedly claimed to have had a film career in Germany and to have directed films starring Marlene Dietrich and Erich von Stroheim, including The Blue Angel (1930), which was actually directed by Josef von Sternberg. Mesa of Lost Women is Tevos's only known film credit.

Pergor Productions was unable to secure distribution for Tarantula and sold the footage to Howco Productions Inc. in early 1952, with Ron Ormond assigned to direct additional material. Tandra Quinn recalled that among the new sequences created by Ormond were the scenes of the Aranya and Tarantella characters being killed. Katherine Victor recalled being hired by Ormond in order to create her desert sequences. Filming locations included the Red Rock Canyon State Park.

Hoyt Curtin composed the score which makes use of flamenco guitar and piano, combined in an apparent free jazz style. This music was later used in Ed Wood's Jail Bait (1954). The narrator Lyle Talbot also appeared in several films by Wood, including Plan 9 from Outer Space (1959), as did the "spider-woman" actresses Dolores Fuller and Mona McKinnon. The film also features the debut of Katina Vea (as the spider-woman who first drove Masterson to the desert) who was later a regular in Jerry Warren films using the stage name Katherine Victor. One of the dwarfs in the film was Angelo Rossitto, a veteran of Poverty Row horror films whose film career had started in the 1920s.

Although Tarantella is a key character of the film, it was a silent part. Decades later, Quinn recalled that she never received "a decent speaking part" in a film. She reportedly chose her stage name by modifying Tevos's suggestion of Tandra Nova which she thought unsuitable and reminiscent of Lou Nova. She instead chose the last name Quinn in honor of dancer Joan Quinn.

Mesa of Lost Women was noted for being one of several 1950s science fiction films that utilized wire-controlled giant spider props, the others being Cat-Women of the Moon (1953), Tarantula (1955), World Without End (1956), Queen of Outer Space (1958), and the Cat-Women of the Moon remake Missile to the Moon (1958). The spider prop used in Mesa of Lost Women was limited in movement, a single jump being its only action feat.

== Release ==
The film was distributed in the United States by Howco Productions Inc. and reissued in 1956 through Ron Ormond Enterprises.

== Critical reception ==
Critical response to the film was negative. Film critic Glenn Erickson wrote that "watching [the film] is like being on drugs ... [it has] lapses in judgment that boggle the mind." In a review for AllMovie, Richard Gilliam wrote that "the overall film is a dull, tepid mess." Critic Nigel Honeybone described the film as "so bad you have to ask yourself, is it actually evil?"

Gilliam called the plot "incoherent" while Honeybone found it "muddled and misguided" and Erickson found that the "ridiculously complicated plot hides the fact that nothing really happens". Gilliam found the characters to be lifeless and Erickson felt that the performances did not fit with the narrative. He described the direction as "incompetent [and] awkward" in the style of Ed Wood.

The loud and repetitive musical score by Hoyt S. Curtin, melding flamenco guitar and piano, is described variously as "very able, a sustained inspiration" and insanity-driving repetition.

The film has been spoofed by RiffTrax.

== See also ==
- List of films in the public domain in the United States

== Footnotes ==
=== Sources ===
- Craig, Rob (2009), "Jail Bait (1954)", Ed Wood, Mad Genius: A Critical Study of the Films, McFarland & Company, ISBN 978-0-7864-5423-5
- Johnson, John (1996), "Wire Propelled Props", Cheap Tricks and Class Acts: Special Effects, Makeup, and Stunts from the Films of the Fantastic Fifties, McFarland & Company, ISBN 978-0-7864-0093-5
- Johnson, John (1996), "Giants and Midgets", Cheap Tricks and Class Acts: Special Effects, Makeup, and Stunts from the Films of the Fantastic Fifties, McFarland & Company, ISBN 978-0-7864-0093-5
- Johnson, John (1996), "Low Budget Filming and Convenient Sites", Cheap Tricks and Class Acts: Special Effects, Makeup, and Stunts from the Films of the Fantastic Fifties, McFarland & Company, ISBN 978-0-7864-0093-5
- Weaver, Tom (2000), "Katherine Victor", Return of the B Science Fiction and Horror Heroes: The Mutant Melding of Two Volumes of Classic Interviews Volume 21 of McFarland Classics Series, McFarland & Company, ISBN 978-0-7864-0755-2
- Weaver, Tom (2009), "Tandra Quinn", I Talked with a Zombie: Interviews with 23 Veterans of Horror and Sci-fi Films and Television, McFarland & Company, ISBN 978-0-7864-5268-2
